= 56th Legislature of the National Congress =

Brazilian legislature (2019–2023)

56th Legislature of National Congress
←	55th	57th	→
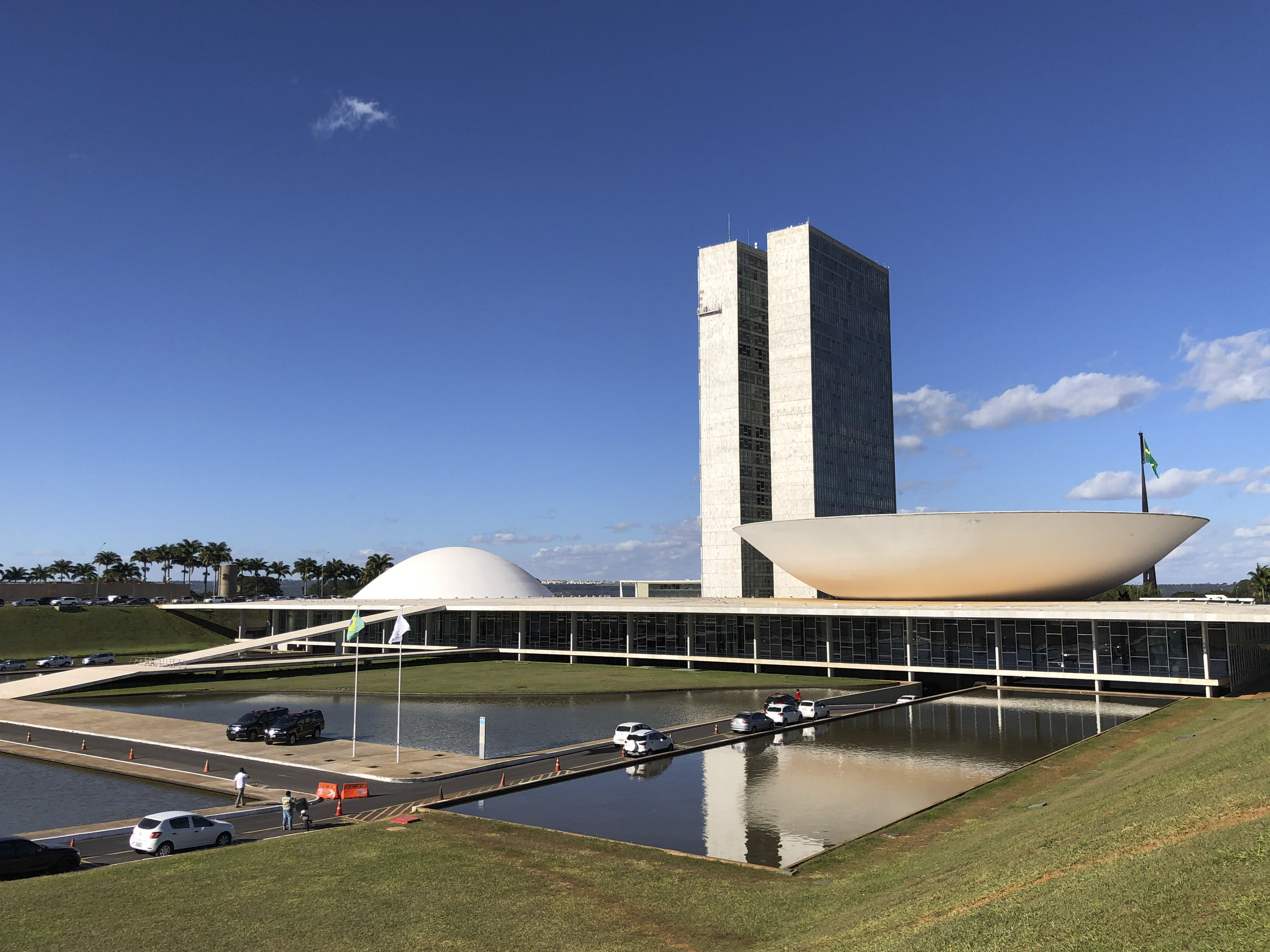

Overview
- Legislative body: National Congress
- Meeting place: National Congress Palace
- Term: 1 February 2019 – 31 January 2023
- Election: 7 October 2018
- Government: Bolsonaro cabinet; (until 1 January 2023); Second Lula cabinet; (from 1 January 2023)
- Website: congressonacional.leg.br

Federal Senate
- Members: 81 senators
- President of the Federal Senate: Davi Alcolumbre (DEM-AP) (until 1 February 2021); Rodrigo Pacheco (PSD-MG) (from 1 February 2021)

Chamber of Deputies
- Members: 513 deputies
- President of the Chamber of Deputies: Rodrigo Maia (DEM-RJ) (until 1 February 2021); Arthur Lira (PP-AL) (from 1 February 2021)

Sessions
- 1st: 1 February 2019 – 23 December 2019
- 2nd: 3 February 2020 – 22 December 2020
- 3rd: 1 February 2021 – 21 December 2021
- 4th: 2 February 2022 – 22 December 2022

The 56th Legislature of National Congress was a meeting of the legislative branch of the Federal Government of Brazil, composed by the Federal Senate and the Chamber of Deputies. It convened in Brasília on 1 February 2019, a month after the beginning of Jair Bolsonaro's only term as president, and ended on 31 January 2023.

In the 2018 elections, the Workers' Party won the majority of the Chamber with 56 deputies. The Brazilian Democratic Movement kept the majority in the Senate with 12 senators. (Note: As in Brazil the government is formed by a coalition, it is hard for a party to reach the majority of 257 deputies and/or 41 senators. Therefore, the majority party is the one with more members in each house.)

== Major events ==
- 1 February 2019: Rodrigo Maia elect president for a third term as leader of the Chamber.
- 2 February 2019: Davi Alcolumbre elect president for his first term as leader of the Senate.
- 4 February 2019: Joint session of the National Congress to officially inaugurate the 56th Legislature.
- 10 July 2019: The Chamber of Deputies approves PEC 6/2019 (Social Security Reform).
- 25 September 2019: Public hearing of sub-prosecutor Augusto Aras for Prosecutor General of the Republic in the Constitution and Justice Committee of the Federal Senate. His appointment was approved by the floor of the Senate on the same day.
- 22 October 2019: Senate floor approves PEC 6/2019 (Social Security Reform).
- 4 December 2019: Chamber floor approves a substitutive project for Minister of Justice and Public Security Sergio Moro law project "anti-crime".
- 3 February 2020: National Congress opens 2nd session of the 56th Legislature with a letter from President Bolsonaro read by Chief of Staff Onyx Lorenzoni.
- 18 March 2020: Chamber of Deputies approves the declaration of public calamity sent by president Jair Bolsonaro due to the COVID-19 pandemic in Brazil.
- 20 March 2020: Senate approves the declaration of public calamity in its first virtual session presided by senator Antônio Anastasia (PSDB-MG).
- 21 October 2020: Senate approves the appointment of Nunes Marques for the Supreme Federal Court.
- 1 February 2021: Election for the Director's Board of the Chamber of Deputies and the Federal Senate, with Deputy Arthur Lira (PP-AL) elect leader of the lower house and Senator Rodrigo Pacheco (DEM-MG) elect leader of the upper house.
- 3 February 2021: National Congress opens 3rd session of the 56th Legislature with a letter from President Bolsonaro.
- 13 April 2021: Senate President Rodrigo Pacheco (DEM-MG) accepts a request of Senator Randolfe Rodrigues (REDE-AP) and other senators for the creation of an Inquiry Parliamentary Committee to investigate the acts of the federal government in the COVID-19 pandemic.
- 20 August 2021: The Senate receives an impeachment request against Supreme Court Justice Alexandre de Moraes filed by President Jair Bolsonaro.
- 24 August 2021: Public hearing of Augusto Aras for a second term as Prosecutor General of the Republic in the Constitution and Justice Committee of the Federal Senate. His appointment was approved by the floor of the Senate on the same day.
- 25 August 2021: Senate President Rodrigo Pacheco rejects and archive the impeachment request against Justice Alexandre de Moraes.
- 26 October 2021: COVID-19 CPI in the Senate conclude its works with the approval of the report in a voting of 7-4, recommending criminal charges against 2 companies and 78 individuals, including President Jair Bolsonaro.
- 1 December 2021: Senate approves the appointment of André Mendonça for the Supreme Federal Court.
- 2 February 2022: National Congress opens 4th and last session of the 56th Legislature with speeches of President Bolsonaro, Chamber President Arthur Lira and Senate and Congress President Rodrigo Pacheco.
- 7 December 2022: The Senate approves PEC 32/2022 (Transition Act), to guarantee extra R$ 145 billion (US$27.38 billion) for the 2023 budget plan as requested by the transition team of President-elect Luiz Inácio Lula da Silva.
- 1 January 2023: Luiz Inácio Lula da Silva is inaugurated as President of Brazil.
- 8 January 2023: The Congress, the Planalto Palace and the Supreme Federal Court are stormed by former president Bolsonaro supporters. Justice Minister Flávio Dino reports at least 1,500 were arrested.
- 10 January 2023: The Congress approves the federal intervention in the Federal District.

== Party summary ==
Party	Votes	%	Seats	+/–
Social Liberal Party	11,457,878	11.65	52	+51
Workers' Party	10,126,611	10.30	56	−13
Brazilian Social Democracy Party	5,905,541	6.01	29	−25
Social Democratic Party	5,749,008	5.85	34	−2
Progressistas	5,480,067	5.57	37	−1
Brazilian Democratic Movement	5,439,167	5.53	34	−32
Brazilian Socialist Party	5,386,400	5.48	32	−2
Party of the Republic	5,224,591	5.31	33	−1
Brazilian Republican Party	4,992,016	5.08	30	+9
Democrats	4,581,162	4.66	29	+8
Democratic Labour Party	4,545,846	4.62	28	+9
Socialism and Liberty Party	2,783,669	2.83	10	+5
New Party	2,748,079	2.79	8	New
Podemos	2,243,320	2.28	11	+7
Republican Party of the Social Order	2,042,610	2.08	8	−3
Brazilian Labour Party	2,022,719	2.06	10	−15
Solidariedade	1,953,067	1.99	13	−2
Avante	1,844,048	1.88	7	+6
Social Christian Party	1,765,226	1.80	8	−5
Green Party	1,592,173	1.62	4	−4
Popular Socialist Party	1,590,084	1.62	8	−2
Patriota	1,432,304	1.46	5	+3
Humanist Party of Solidarity	1,426,444	1.45	6	+1
Communist Party of Brazil	1,329,575	1.35	9	−1
Progressive Republican Party	851,368	0.87	4	+1
Sustainability Network	816,784	0.83	1	New
Brazilian Labour Renewal Party	684,976	0.70	0	−1
Party of National Mobilization	634,129	0.64	3	0
Christian Labour Party	601,814	0.61	2	0
Free Fatherland Party	385,197	0.39	1	+1
Christian Democracy	369,386	0.38	1	−1
Brazilian Woman's Party	228,302	0.23	0	New
Brazilian Communist Party	61,343	0.06	0	0
United Socialist Workers' Party	41,304	0.04	0	0
Workers' Cause Party	2,785	0.00	0	0
Total	98,338,993	100.00	513	0
Valid votes	98,338,993	83.97		
Invalid/blank votes	18,771,737	16.03		
Total votes	117,110,730	100.00		
Registered voters/turnout	146,750,529	79.80		
Source: Election Resources

Party	Votes	%	Seats		
Party	Votes	%	Won	Total	+/−
Workers' Party	24,785,670	14.46	4	6	−6
Brazilian Social Democracy Party	20,310,558	11.85	4	9	−1
Social Liberal Party	19,413,869	11.33	4	4	New
Brazilian Democratic Movement	12,800,290	7.47	7	12	−6
Democrats	9,218,658	5.38	4	6	+1
Brazilian Socialist Party	8,234,195	4.80	2	2	−5
Social Democratic Party	8,202,342	4.79	4	7	+4
Democratic Labour Party	7,737,982	4.52	2	4	−4
Progressistas	7,529,901	4.39	5	5	0
Sustainability Network	7,166,003	4.18	5	5	New
Podemos	5,494,125	3.21	1	5	+5
Socialism and Liberty Party	5,273,853	3.08	0	0	−1
Humanist Party of Solidarity	4,228,973	2.47	2	2	New
Social Christian Party	4,126,068	2.41	1	1	+1
Solidariedade	4,001,903	2.34	1	1	0
New Party	3,467,746	2.02	0	0	New
Party of the Republic	3,130,082	1.83	1	2	−2
Popular Socialist Party	2,954,800	1.72	2	2	New
Progressive Republican Party	1,974,061	1.15	1	1	+1
Brazilian Labour Party	1,899,838	1.11	2	3	0
Communist Party of Brazil	1,673,190	0.98	0	0	−1
Brazilian Republican Party	1,505,607	0.88	1	1	0
Republican Party of the Social Order	1,370,513	0.80	1	1	0
Green Party	1,226,392	0.72	0	0	−1
Brazilian Labour Renewal Party	886,267	0.52	0	0	0
Avante	731,379	0.43	0	0	0
Free Fatherland Party	504,209	0.29	0	0	0
United Socialist Workers' Party	413,914	0.24	0	0	0
Party of National Mobilization	329,973	0.19	0	0	0
Brazilian Communist Party	256,655	0.15	0	0	0
Christian Labour Party	222,931	0.13	0	1	+1
Christian Democracy	154,068	0.09	0	0	0
Patriota	60,589	0.04	0	0	0
Brazilian Woman's Party	51,027	0.03	0	0	New
Workers' Cause Party	38,691	0.02	0	0	0
Independent	0	0.00	0	1	+1
Total	171,376,322	100.00	54	81	0
Total votes	117,111,478	–			
Registered voters/turnout	146,750,529	79.80			
Source: Election Resources, G1

== Leadership ==
=== Federal Senate ===
President of the Federal Senate

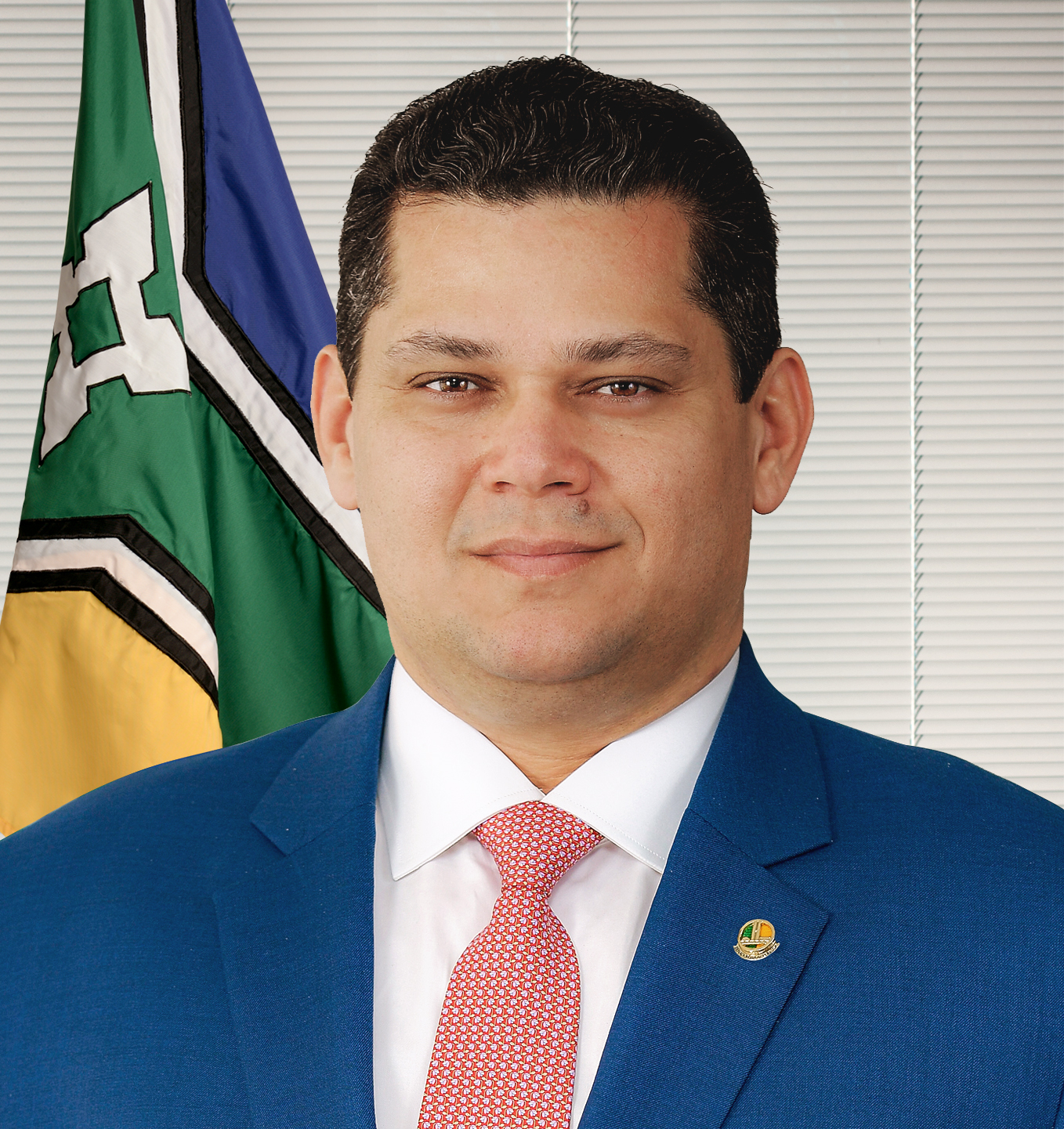
Davi Alcolumbre (DEM),
until 1 February 2021

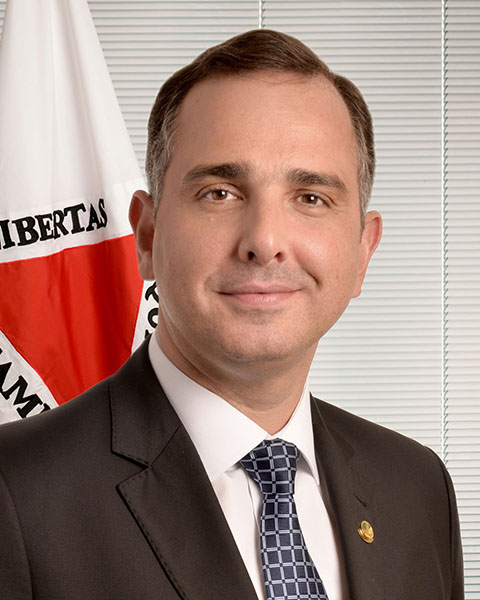
Rodrigo Pacheco (DEM),
from 1 February 2021

- President of the Federal Senate: Davi Alcolumbre (DEM–AP), until 1 February 2021
  - Rodrigo Pacheco (PSD–MG), from 1 February 2021

Candidate	Party	Votes	%
Davi Alcolumbre (AP) ✓	DEM	42	54.55
Esperidião Amin (SC)	PP	13	16.88
Angelo Coronel (BA)	PSD	8	10.39
José Reguffe (DF)	Ind.	6	7.79
Renan Calheiros (AL)	MDB	5	6.49
Fernando Collor (AL)	PROS	3	3.90
Total		77	100.00
Valid votes		77	100.00
Invalid/blank votes		0	0.00
Total votes		77	100.00
Registered voters/turnout		81	95.06

Candidate	Party	Votes	%
Rodrigo Pacheco (MG) ✓	DEM	57	73.08
Simone Tebet (MS)	MDB	21	26.92
Total		78	100.00
Valid votes		78	100.00
Invalid/blank votes		0	0.00
Total votes		78	100.00
Registered voters/turnout		81	96.30

- Government Leader: Carlos Portinho (PL-RJ)
- Majority Leader: Renan Calheiros (MDB-AL)
- Opposition Leader: Randolfe Rodrigues (REDE-AP)
- Minority Leader: Jean-Paul Prates (PT-RN)
- MDB Leader: Eduardo Braga (AM)
- PSD Leader: Nelson Trad (MS)
- PL Leader: Flávio Bolsonaro (RJ)
- PODE Leader: Alvaro Dias (PR)
- PP Leader: Mailza Gomes (AC)
- PT Leader: Paulo Rocha (PA)
- UNIÃO Leader: Davi Alcolumbre (AP)
- PSDB Leader: Izalci Lucas (DF)
- PDT Leader: Cid Gomes (CE)
- PROS Leader: Telmário Mota (RR)
- PSB Leader: Dário Berger (SC)
- PTB Leader: Roberto Rocha (MA)
- Cidadania Leader: Eliziane Gama (MA)
- PSC Leader: Luiz Carlos do Carmo (GO)
- Republicanos Leader: Mecias de Jesus (RR)
- REDE Leader: Randolfe Rodrigues (AP)

=== Chamber of Deputies ===
President of the Chamber of Deputies

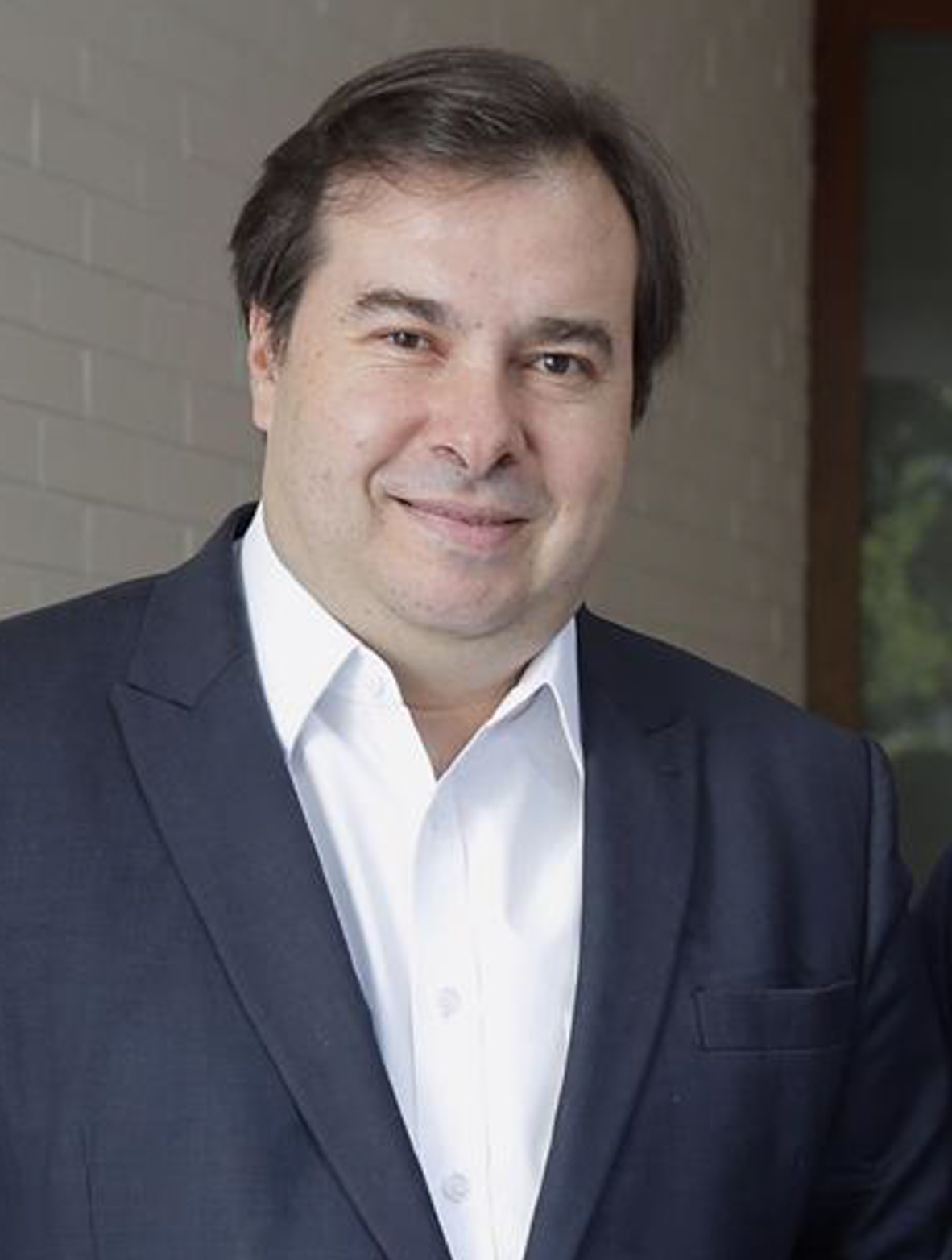
Rodrigo Maia (DEM),
until 1 February 2021

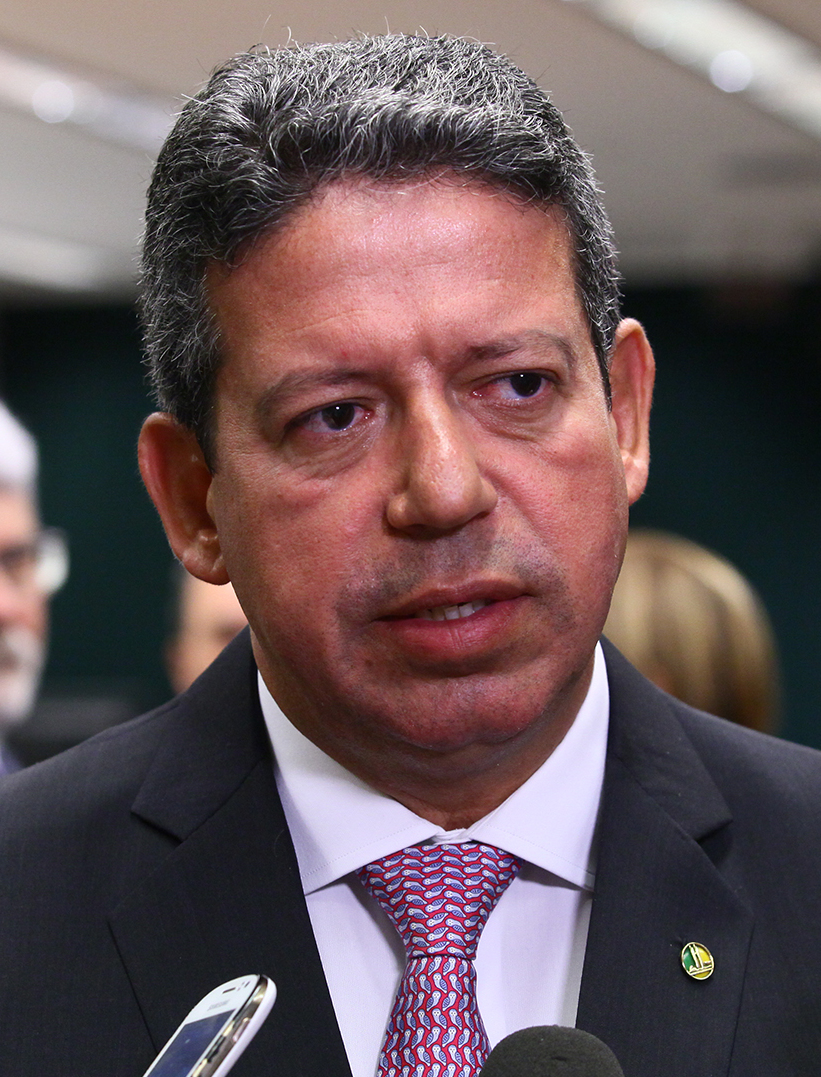
Arthur Lira (PP),
from 1 February 2021

- President of the Chamber of Deputies: Rodrigo Maia (DEM), until 1 February 2021
  - Arthur Lira (PP), from 1 February 2021

Candidate	Party	Votes	%
Rodrigo Maia (RJ) ✓	DEM	334	65.62
Fábio Ramalho (MG)	MDB	66	12.97
Marcelo Freixo (RJ)	PSOL	50	9.82
João Henrique Caldas (AL)	PSB	30	5.89
Marcel van Hattem (RS)	NOVO	23	4.52
Ricardo Barros (PR)	PP	4	0.79
Roberto Peternelli (SP)	PSL	2	0.39
Total		509	100.00
Valid votes		509	99.41
Invalid/blank votes		3	0.59
Total votes		512	100.00
Registered voters/turnout		513	99.81

Candidate	Party	Votes	%
Arthur Lira (AL) ✓	PP	302	60.04
Baleia Rossi (SP)	MDB	145	28.83
Fábio Ramalho (MG)	MDB	21	4.17
Luiza Erundina (SP)	PSOL	16	3.18
Marcel van Hattem (RS)	NOVO	13	2.58
André Janones (MG)	Avante	3	0.60
Kim Kataguiri (SP)	DEM	2	0.40
Roberto Peternelli (SP)	PSL	1	0.20
Total		503	100.00
Valid votes		503	99.60
Invalid/blank votes		2	0.40
Total votes		505	100.00
Registered voters/turnout		513	98.44

- Government Leader: Ricardo Barros (PP-PR)
- Majority Leader: Diego Andrade (PSD-MG)
- Opposition Leader: Wolney Queiroz (PDT-RJ)
- Minority Leader: Alencar Santana (PT-SP)
- PL Leader: Altineu Côrtes (RJ)
- PP Leader: André Fufuca (MA)
- PT Leader: Reginaldo Lopes (MG)
- UNIÃO Leader: Elmar Nascimento (BA)
- PSD Leader: Antonio Brito (BA)
- Republicanos Leader: Vinicius Carvalho (SP)
- MDB Leader: Isnaldo Bulhões (AL)
- PSB Leader: Ubirajara do Pindaré (MA)
- PSDB Leader: Adolfo Viana (BA)
- PDT Leader: André Figueiredo (CE)
- PCdoB Leader: Renildo Calheiros (PE)
- NOVO Leader: Tiago Mitraud (MG)
- PODE Leader: Igor Timo (MG)
- PSC Leader: Euclydes Pettersen (MG)
- PSOL Leader: Sâmia Bomfim (SP)
- Solidariedade Leader: Lucas Vergílio (GO)
- Cidadania Leader: Alex Manente (SP)
- Avante Leader: Sebastião Oliveira (PE)
- Patriota Leader: Fred Costa (MG)
- PROS Leader: Aline Sleutjes (PR)
- PV Leader: João Carlos Bacelar Batista (BA)
- PTB Leader: Paulo Bengtson (PA)
- REDE Representative: Joenia Wapichana (RR)

== Members ==
=== Federal Senate ===
==== Acre ====
▌ Mailza Gomes (PP), until 1 January 2023

▌ José Teixeira (PL), from 2 January 2023

▌ Márcio Bittar (UNIÃO)
▌ Sérgio Petecão (PSD)

==== Alagoas ====
▌ Fernando Collor (PTB)
▌ Renan Calheiros (MDB)
▌ Rodrigo Cunha (PSDB)

==== Amapá ====
▌ Davi Alcolumbre (UNIÃO)
▌ Lucas Barreto (PSD)
▌ Randolfe Rodrigues (REDE)

==== Amazonas ====
▌ Eduardo Braga (MDB)
▌ Omar Aziz (PSD)
▌ Plínio Valério (PSDB)

==== Bahia ====
▌ Angelo Coronel (PSD)
▌ Jaques Wagner (PT)
▌ Otto Alencar (PSD)

==== Ceará ====
▌ Cid Gomes (PDT)
▌ Eduardo Girão (PODE)
▌ Tasso Jereissati (PSDB)

==== Espírito Santo ====
▌ Fabiano Contarato (PT)
▌ Marcos do Val (PODE)
▌ Rose de Freitas (MDB)

==== Federal District ====
▌ Izalci Lucas (PSDB)
▌ José Reguffe (UNIÃO)
▌ Leila Barros (PDT)

==== Goiás ====
▌ Jorge Kajuru (PODE)
▌ Luiz do Carmo (PSC)
▌ Vanderlan Cardoso (PSD)

==== Maranhão ====
▌ Eliziane Gama (Cidadania)
▌ Roberto Rocha (PTB)
▌ Weverton Rocha (PDT)

==== Mato Grosso ====
▌ Jayme Campos (UNIÃO)
▌ Selma Arruda (PODE), until 15 April 2020

▌ Carlos Fávaro (PSD), from 15 December 2020

▌ Wellington Fagundes (PL)

==== Mato Grosso do Sul ====
▌ Nelsinho Trad (PSD)
▌ Simone Tebet (MDB)
▌ Soraya Thronicke (UNIÃO)

==== Minas Gerais ====
▌ Antonio Anastasia (PSD), until 2 February 2022

▌ Alexandre Silveira (PSD), from 2 February 2022

▌ Carlos Viana (PL)
▌ Rodrigo Pacheco (PSD)

==== Pará ====
▌ Jader Barbalho (MDB)
▌ Paulo Rocha (PT)
▌ Zequinha Marinho (PL)

==== Paraíba ====
▌ Daniella Ribeiro (PP)
▌ José Maranhão (MDB), until 6 February 2021

▌ Nilda Gondim (MDB), from 6 February 2021

▌ Veneziano Vital do Rêgo (MDB)

==== Paraná ====
▌ Alvaro Dias (PODE)
▌ Flávio Arns (PODE)
▌ Oriovisto Guimarães (PODE)

==== Pernambuco ====
▌ Fernando Bezerra Coelho (MDB)
▌ Humberto Costa (PT)
▌ Jarbas Vasconcelos (MDB)

==== Piauí ====
▌ Ciro Nogueira (PP)
▌ Elmano Férrer (PP)
▌ Marcelo Castro (MDB)

==== Rio de Janeiro ====
▌ Arolde de Oliveira (PSD), until 21 October 2020

▌ Carlos Portinho (PL), from 3 November 2020

▌ Flávio Bolsonaro (PL)
▌ Romário Faria (PL)

==== Rio Grande do Norte ====
▌ Jean-Paul Prates (PT)
▌ Styvenson Valentim (PODE)
▌ Zenaide Maia (PROS)

==== Rio Grande do Sul ====
▌ Lasier Martins (PODE)
▌ Luis Carlos Heinze (PP)
▌ Paulo Paim (PT)

==== Rondônia ====
▌ Acir Gurgacz (PDT)
▌ Confúcio Moura (MDB)
▌ Marcos Rogério (PL)

==== Roraima ====
▌ Chico Rodrigues (UNIÃO)
▌ Mecias de Jesus (Republicanos)
▌ Telmário Mota (PROS)

==== Santa Catarina ====
▌ Dário Berger (PSB)
▌ Esperidião Amin (PP)
▌ Jorginho Mello (PL), until 29 December 2022

▌ Ivete da Silveira (MDB), from 30 December 2022

==== São Paulo ====
▌ José Serra (PSDB)
▌ Mara Gabrilli (PSDB)
▌ Sérgio Olímpio (PSL), until 19 March 2021

▌ Alexandre Giordano (MDB), from 31 March 2021

==== Sergipe ====
▌ Alessandro Vieira (PSDB)
▌ Maria do Carmo Alves (PP)
▌ Rogério Carvalho (PT)

==== Tocantins ====
▌ Eduardo Gomes (PL)
▌ Irajá Abreu (PSD)
▌ Kátia Abreu (PP)

=== Chamber of Deputies ===
==== Acre ====
▌ Alan Rick (UNIÃO)
▌ Antônia Lúcia (Republicanos)
▌ Flaviano Melo (MDB)
▌ Jéssica Sales (MDB)
▌ Jesus Sérgio (PDT)
▌ Manuel Marcos (Republicanos), until 5 November 2020

▌ Leo de Brito (PT), from 6 November 2020

▌ Mara Rocha (MDB)
▌ Perpétua Almeida (PCdoB)
▌ Vanda Milani (PROS)

==== Alagoas ====
▌ Arthur Lira (PP)
▌ Isnaldo Bulhões (MDB)
▌ João Henrique Caldas (PSB), until 1 January 2021

▌ Pedro Vilela (PSDB), from 1 January 2021

▌ Marx Beltrão (PP)
▌ Nivaldo Albuquerque (Republicanos)
▌ Paulo Fernando (PT)
▌ Sergio Toledo (PV)
▌ Severino Pessoa (MDB)
▌ Tereza Nelma (PSD)

==== Amapá ====
▌ Acácio Favacho (MDB)
▌ Aline Gurgel (Republicanos)
▌ André Abdon (PP)
▌ Camilo Capiberibe (PSB)
▌ Leda Sadala (PP)
▌ Luiz Carlos Gomes (PSDB)
▌ Professora Marcivânia (PCdoB)
▌ Vinicius Gurgel (PL)

==== Amazonas ====
▌ Capitão Alberto Neto (PL)
▌ Átila Lins (PSD)
▌ Bosco Saraiva (Solidariedade)
▌ José Ricardo (PT)
▌ Marcelo Ramos (PSD)
▌ Pablo Oliva (UNIÃO)
▌ Sidney Leite (PSD)
▌ Silas Câmara (Republicanos)

==== Bahia ====
▌ Abílio Santana (PODE)
▌ Adolfo Viana (PSDB)
▌ Afonso Florence (PT)
▌ Alex Santana (Republicanos)
▌ Alice Portugal (PCdoB)
▌ Antonio Brito (PSD)
▌ Arthur Oliveira Maia (UNIÃO)
▌ Cacá Leão (PP)
▌ Carlos Tito (Avante)
▌ Claudio Cajado (PP)
▌ Daniel Almeida (PCdoB)
▌ Dayane Pimentel (UNIÃO)
▌ Elmar Nascimento (UNIÃO)
▌ Félix Mendonça Júnior (PDT)
▌ Igor Kannário (UNIÃO)
▌ João Bacelar Batista (PV)
▌ João Carlos Bacelar (PL)
▌ João Roma (PL)
▌ Jorge Solla (PT)
▌ José Nunes (PSD)
▌ José Rocha (UNIÃO)
▌ José Santana Neto (PT)
▌ Josias Gomes (PT)
▌ Leur Lomanto Júnior (UNIÃO)
▌ Lídice da Mata (PSB)
▌ Manoel Isidório (Avante)
▌ Marcelo Nilo (Republicanos)
▌ Márcio Marinho (Republicanos)
▌ Mário Negromonte Jr. (PP)
▌ Nelson Pelegrino (PT)
▌ Otto Alencar Filho (PSD)
▌ Paulo Azi (UNIÃO)
▌ Raimundo Costa (PODE)
▌ Ronaldo Carletto (PP)
▌ Sérgio Brito (PSD)
▌ Uldurico Júnior (MDB)
▌ Valmir Assunção (PT)
▌ Waldenor Pereira (PT)

==== Ceará ====
▌ AJ Albuquerque (PP)
▌ André Figueiredo (PDT)
▌ Célio Studart (PSD)
▌ Danilo Forte (UNIÃO)
▌ Denis Bezerra (PSB)
▌ Domingos Neto (PSD)
▌ Eduardo Bismarck (PDT)
▌ Genecias Noronha (PL)
▌ Heitor Freire (UNIÃO)
▌ Idilvan Alencar (PDT)
▌ Jaziel Pereira (PL)
▌ José Félix Cirilo (PT)
▌ José Guimarães (PT)
▌ Júnior Mano (PL)
▌ Luizianne Lins (PT)
▌ Mauro Benevides Filho (PDT)
▌ Moses Rodrigues (UNIÃO)
▌ Pedro Augusto Bezerra (PDT)
▌ Robério Monteiro (PDT)
▌ Roberto Pessoa (PSDB)
▌ Vaidon Oliveira (UNIÃO)

==== Espírito Santo ====
▌ Amaro Neto (Republicanos)
▌ Evair de Mello (PP)
▌ Felipe Rigoni (UNIÃO)
▌ Helder Salomão (PT)
▌ Da Vitória (PP)
▌ Lauriete Malta (PSC)
▌ Norma Ayub (PP)
▌ Paulo Foletto (PSB)
▌ Sergio Vidigal (PDT)
▌ Soraya Manato (PTB)

==== Federal District ====
▌ Bia Kicis (PL)
▌ Celina Leão (PP), until 1 January 2023

▌ Marcos Pacco (PODE), from 1 January 2023

▌ Erika Kokay (PT)
▌ Flávia Arruda (PL)
▌ Israel Batista (PSB)
▌ Julio Cesar Ribeiro (Republicanos)
▌ Luis Miranda (Republicanos)
▌ Paula Belmonte (Cidadania)

==== Goiás ====
▌ Adriano do Baldy (PP)
▌ Alcides Ribeiro (PL)
▌ Alcides Rodrigues (Patriota)
▌ Célio Silveira (MDB)
▌ Elias Vaz (PSB)
▌ Flávia Morais (PDT)
▌ Francisco Jr. (PSD)
▌ Glaustin da Fokus (PSC)
▌ João Campos (Republicanos)
▌ José Mario Schreiner (MDB)
▌ José Nelto (PP)
▌ Lucas Vergílio (Solidariedade)
▌ Magda Mofatto (PL)
▌ Rubens Otoni (PT)
▌ Major Vitor Hugo (PL)
▌ Delegado Waldir (UNIÃO)
▌ Zacharias Calil (UNIÃO)

==== Maranhão ====
▌ Aluísio Mendes (Republicanos)
▌ André Fufuca (PP)
▌ Cléber Verde (Republicanos)
▌ Edilázio Júnior (PSD)
▌ Eduardo Braide (PODE), until 1 January 2021

▌ Josivaldo JP (PSD), from 1 January 2021

▌ Gil Cutrim (Republicanos)
▌ Pastor Gil (PL)
▌ Hildo Rocha (MDB), until 23 January 2023

▌ Wolmer Araújo (PV), from 23 January 2023

▌ João Marcelo Souza (MDB)
▌ José Carlos Nunes (PT)
▌ Josimar Maranhãozinho (PL)
▌ Junior Lourenço (PL)
▌ Juscelino Filho (UNIÃO)
▌ Márcio Jerry (PCdoB)
▌ Marreca Filho (Patriota)
▌ Pedro Lucas Fernandes (UNIÃO)
▌ Rubens Pereira Júnior (PT)
▌ Ubirajara do Pindaré (PSB)

==== Mato Grosso ====
▌ Carlos Bezerra (MDB)
▌ Emanuel Pinheiro Neto (MDB)
▌ José Medeiros (PL)
▌ Juarez Costa (MDB)
▌ Leonardo Ribeiro (Republicanos)
▌ Nelson Ned (Liberal Party (Brazil, 2006)
▌ Neri Geller (PP)
▌ Rosa Neide (PT)

==== Mato Grosso do Sul ====
▌ Antônio Pinheiro (PT)
▌ Beto Pereira (PSDB)
▌ Dagoberto Nogueira (PSDB)
▌ Fábio Trad (PSD)
▌ Loester Trutis (PL)
▌ Luiz Ovando (PP)
▌ Rose Modesto (UNIÃO)
▌ Tereza Cristina (PP)
▌ Vander Loubet (PT)

==== Minas Gerais ====
▌ Aécio Neves (PSDB)
▌ Alessandra Silva (Republicanos)
▌ André Janones (Avante)
▌ Áurea Carolina (PSOL)
▌ Bilac Pinto (UNIÃO)
▌ Charlles Evangelista (PP)
▌ Diego Andrade (PSD)
▌ Dimas Fabiano (PP)
▌ Domingos Sávio (PL)
▌ Eduardo Barbosa (PSDB)
▌ Emidinho Madeira (PL)
▌ Eros Biondini (PL)
▌ Euclydes Pettersen (PSC)
▌ Fabio Ramalho (MDB)
▌ Franco Cartafina (PP)
▌ Frederico Costa (Patriota)
▌ Dr. Frederico (Patriota)
▌ Gilberto Abramo (Republicanos)
▌ Greyce Elias (Avante)
▌ Igor Timo (PODE)
▌ Padre João (PT)
▌ Zé Silva (Solidariedade)
▌ Zé Vitor (PL)
▌ Júlio Delgado (PV)
▌ Junio Amaral (PL)
▌ Lafayette de Andrada (Republicanos)
▌ Léo Motta (Republicanos)
▌ Leonardo Monteiro (PT)
▌ Lincoln Portela (PL)
▌ Lucas Gonzalez (NOVO)
▌ Luis Tibé (Avante)
▌ Luiz Gonzaga Ribeiro (PSD)
▌ Marcelo Álvaro Antônio (PL)
▌ Marcelo Aro (PP)
▌ Margarida Salomão (PT), until 1 January 2021

▌ Aelton Freitas (PP), from 1 January 2021

▌ Delegado Marcelo Freitas (UNIÃO)
▌ Mário Heringer (PDT)
▌ Mauro Lopes (PP)
▌ Misael Varella (PSD)
▌ Newton Cardoso Jr. (MDB)
▌ Odair Cunha (PT)
▌ Patrus Ananias (PT)
▌ Paulo Abi-Ackel (PSDB)
▌ Paulo Guedes (PT)
▌ Reginaldo Lopes (PT)
▌ Rodrigo de Castro (PSDB)
▌ Rogério Correia (PT)
▌ Stefano Aguiar (PSD)
▌ Tiago Mitraud (NOVO)
▌ Weliton Prado (PROS)

==== Pará ====
▌ Airton Faleiro (PT)
▌ Beto Faro (PT)
▌ Cássio Andrade (PSB)
▌ Celso Sabino (UNIÃO)
▌ Cristiano Vale (PP)
▌ Edmilson Rodrigues (PSOL), until 1 January 2021

▌ Vivi Reis (PSOL), from 1 January 2021

▌ Éder Mauro (PL)
▌ Eduardo Costa (PSD)
▌ Elcione Barbalho (MDB)
▌ Hélio Leite (UNIÃO)
▌ Joaquim Passarinho (PL)
▌ José Priante (MDB)
▌ Júnior Ferrari (PSD)
▌ Nilson Pinto (PSDB)
▌ Olival Marques (MDB)
▌ Paulo Bengtson (PTB)
▌ Vavá Martins (Republicanos)

==== Paraíba ====
▌ Aguinaldo Ribeiro (PP)
▌ Anastacio Ribeiro (PT)
▌ Damião Feliciano (UNIÃO)
▌ Edna Henrique (Republicanos)
▌ Efraim Filho (UNIÃO)
▌ Gervásio Maia (PSB)
▌ Hugo Motta (Republicanos)
▌ Julian Lemos (UNIÃO)
▌ Pedro Cunha Lima (PSDB)
▌ Ruy Carneiro (PSC)
▌ Wellington Roberto (PL)
▌ Wilson Santiago (Republicanos)

==== Paraná ====
▌ Aliel Machado (PV)
▌ Aline Sleutjes (PROS)
▌ Aroldo Martins (Republicanos)
▌ Christiane Yared (PP)
▌ Diego Garcia (Republicanos)
▌ Emerson Petriv (PROS), until 17 September 2021

▌ Osmar Serraglio (PP), from 17 September 2021

▌ Enio Verri (PT)
▌ Felipe Francischini (UNIÃO)
▌ Fernando Giacobo (PL)
▌ Filipe Barros (PL)
▌ Gilson Fahur
▌ Gleisi Hoffmann (PT)
▌ Gustavo Fruet (PDT)
▌ Hermes Parcianello (MDB)
▌ José Carlos Schiavinato (PP)
▌ Leandre Dal Ponte (PSD)
▌ Luciano Ducci (PSB)
▌ Luísa Canziani (PSD)
▌ Luiz Goularte (Solidariedade)
▌ Luiz Nishimori (PSD)
▌ Nelsi Cogueto (PL)
▌ Ney Leprevost (UNIÃO)
▌ Paulo Eduardo Martins (PL)
▌ Pedro Lupion (PP)
▌ Ricardo Barros (PP)
▌ Rubens Bueno (Cidadania)
▌ Sandro Alex (PSD)
▌ Sérgio Souza (MDB)
▌ Toninho Wandscheer (PP)
▌ Zeca Dirceu (PT)

==== Pernambuco ====
▌ André de Paula (PSD)
▌ André Ferreira (PL)
▌ Augusto Coutinho (Republicanos)
▌ Carlos Veras (PT)
▌ Daniel Coelho (Cidadania)
▌ Danilo Cabral (PSB)
▌ Eduardo da Fonte (PP)
▌ Felipe Carreras (PSB)
▌ Fernando Coelho Filho (UNIÃO)
▌ Fernando Monteiro (PP)
▌ Fernando Rodolfo (PL)
▌ Francisco Eurico (PL)
▌ Gonzaga Patriota (PSB)
▌ João Henrique Campos (PSB), until 1 January 2021

▌ Milton Coelho (PSB), from 1 January 2021

▌ Luciano Bivar (UNIÃO)
▌ Ossesio Silva (Republicanos)
▌ Raul Henry (MDB)
▌ Renildo Calheiros (PCdoB)
▌ Ricardo Teobaldo (PODE)
▌ Sebastião Oliveira (Avante)
▌ Silvio Costa Filho (Republicanos)
▌ Tadeu Alencar (PSB), until 2 February 2023

▌ Severino Ninho (PSB, from 2 February 2023

▌ Túlio Gadêlha (REDE)
▌ Wolney Queiroz (PDT)

==== Piauí ====
▌ Assis Carvalho (PT), from 5 July 2020

▌ Merlong Solano (PT), from 8 July 2020

▌ Átila Lira] (PP)
▌ Fábio Abreu (PSD)
▌ Flávio Nogueira (PT)
▌ Iracema Portella (PP)
▌ Júlio Cesar (PSD)
▌ Marcos Aurélio Sampaio (PSD)
▌ Margarete Coelho (PP), until 3 January 2023
▌ Marina Santos (Republicanos)
▌ Rejane Dias (PT), until 12 January 2023

▌ Maia Filho (PP), from 12 January 2023

==== Rio de Janeiro ====
▌ Alessandro Molon (PSB)
▌ Alexandre Serfiotis (PSD), until 1 January 2021

▌ Pedro Augusto Palareti (PP)

▌ Altineu Côrtes (PL)
▌ Antônio Furtado (UNIÃO)
▌ Aureo Ribeiro (Solidariedade)
▌ Benedita da Silva (PT)
▌ Carlos Jordy (PL)
▌ Chico d'Ângelo (PDT)
▌ Chiquinho Brazão (UNIÃO)
▌ Chris Tonietto (PL)
▌ Christino Aureo (PP)
▌ Clarissa Garotinho (UNIÃO)
▌ Daniel Silveira (PTB)
▌ Daniela Carneiro (UNIÃO)
▌ David Miranda (PDT)
▌ Major Fabiana (PL)
▌ Felício Laterça (PP)
▌ Flordelis (PSD), until 12 August 2021

▌ Jones Moura (PSD), from 15 September 2021

▌ Gelson Azevedo (PL)
▌ Glauber Braga (PSOL)
▌ Gutemberg Reis (MDB)
▌ Hélio Lopes (PL)
▌ Hugo Leal (PSD)
▌ Jandira Feghali (PCdoB)
▌ Sargento Gurgel (PL)
▌ Jorge Braz (Republicanos)
▌ Joziel Ferreira (Patriota)
▌ Lourival Gomes (PP)
▌ Luiz Lima (PL)
▌ Dr. Luizinho (PP)
▌ Marcelo Calero (PSD)
▌ Marcelo Freixo (PSB)
▌ Márcio Labre (PL)
▌ Otoni de Paula (MDB)
▌ Paulo Ganime (NOVO)
▌ Paulo Ramos (PDT)
▌ Pedro Paulo (PSD)
▌ Rodrigo Maia (PSDB)
▌ Juninho do Pneu (UNIÃO)
▌ Rosângela Gomes (Republicanos)
▌ Soraya Santos (PL)
▌ Sóstenes Cavalcante (PL)
▌ Talíria Petrone (PSOL)
▌ Vinicius Farah (UNIÃO)
▌ Wladimir Garotinho (PSD), until 1 January 2021

▌ Ricardo Correa (PDT), from 1 January 2021

==== Rio Grande do Norte ====
▌ Benes Leocádio (UNIÃO)
▌ Beto Rosado (PP)
▌ Eliéser Girão (PL)
▌ Fábio Faria (PSD)
▌ João Maia (PL)
▌ Natália Bonavides (PT)
▌ Rafael Motta (PSB)
▌ Walter Alves (MDB)

==== Rio Grande do Sul ====
▌ Afonso Hamm (PP)
▌ Afonso Motta (PT)
▌ Alceu Moreira (MDB)
▌ Bibo Nunes (PL)
▌ Bohn Gass (PT)
▌ Carlos Gomes (Republicanos)
▌ Covatti Filho (PP)
▌ Daniel Trzeciak (PSDB)
▌ Danrlei Hinterholz (PSD)
▌ Dionilso Marcon (PT)
▌ Fernanda Melchionna (PSOL)
▌ Giovani Cherini (PL)
▌ Giovani Feltes (MDB)
▌ Henrique Fontana (PT)
▌ Jerônimo Goergen (PP)
▌ Liziane Bayer (Republicanos)
▌ Lucas Redecker (PSDB)
▌ Marcel van Hattem (NOVO)
▌ Marcelo Moraes (PL)
▌ Márcio Biolchi (MDB)
▌ Maria do Rosário (PT)
▌ Marlon Santos (PL)
▌ Maurício Dziedricki (PODE)
▌ Nereu Crispim (PSD)
▌ Onyx Lorenzoni (PL)
▌ Osmar Terra (MDB)
▌ Paulo Pimenta (PT)
▌ Pompeo de Mattos (PDT)
▌ Sanderson (PL)

==== Rondônia ====
▌ Expedito Netto (PSD)
▌ Jaqueline Cassol (PP)
▌ João Chrisóstomo (PL)
▌ Léo Moraes (PODE)
▌ Lucio Mosquini (MDB)
▌ Mariana Carvalho (Republicanos)
▌ Mauro Nazif (PSB)
▌ Silvia Cristina (PL)

==== Roraima ====
▌ Edio Lopes (PL)
▌ Haroldo Cathedral (PSD)
▌ Hiran Gonçalves (PP)
▌ Jhonatan de Jesus (Republicanos)
▌ Joenia Wapichana (REDE)
▌ Nicoletti (UNIÃO)
▌ Ottaci Nascimento (Solidariedade)
▌ Shéridan Oliveira (PSDB)

==== Santa Catarina ====
▌ Angela Amin (PP)
▌ Carlos Chiodini (MDB)
▌ Carmen Zanotto (Cidadania)
▌ Caroline de Toni (PL)
▌ Celso Maldaner (MDB)
▌ Daniel Freitas (PL)
▌ Darci de Matos (PSD)
▌ Fabio Schiochet (UNIÃO)
▌ Geovania de Sá (PSDB)
▌ Luiz Armando Schroeder (PL)
▌ Gilson Marques (NOVO)
▌ Hélio Costa (PSD)
▌ Pedro Uczai (PT)
▌ Ricardo Guidi (PSD)
▌ Rodrigo Coelho (PODE)
▌ Rogério Peninha (MDB)

==== São Paulo ====
▌ Abou Anni (UNIÃO)
▌ Adriana Ventura (NOVO)
▌ Alencar Santana (PT)
▌ Alex Manente (Cidadania)
▌ Alexandre Frota (PROS)
▌ Alexandre Leite (UNIÃO)
▌ Alexandre Padilha (PT)
▌ Alexis Fonteyne (NOVO)
▌ Cezinha de Madureira (PSD)
▌ Arlindo Chinaglia (PT)
▌ Arnaldo Jardim (Cidadania)
▌ Augusto Rosa (PL)
▌ Baleia Rossi (MDB)
▌ Bruna Furlan (PSDB)
▌ Carla Zambelli (PL)
▌ Carlos Sampaio (PSDB)
▌ Carlos Zarattini (PT)
▌ Celso Russomanno (Republicanos)
▌ David Soares (UNIÃO)
▌ Eduardo Bolsonaro (PL)
▌ Eduardo Cury (PSDB)
▌ Eli Corrêa Filho (UNIÃO)
▌ Enrico Misasi (MDB)
▌ Geninho Zuliani (UNIÃO)
▌ Fausto Pinato (PP)
▌ Gilberto Nascimento (PSC)
▌ Guilherme Derrite (PL)
▌ Guilherme Mussi (PP)
▌ Herculano Passos (Republicanos)
▌ Ivan Valente (PSOL)
▌ Jefferson Campos (PL)
▌ Joice Hasselmann (PSDB)
▌ José Guilherme Peixoto (PSC)
▌ Junior Bozzella (UNIÃO)
▌ Katia Sastre (PL)
▌ Kim Kataguiri (UNIÃO)
▌ Luiz Carlos Motta (PL)
▌ Luiz Flávio Gomes (PSB)
▌ Luiz Philippe of Orléans-Braganza (PL)
▌ Luiza Erundina (PSOL)
▌ Marcio Alvino (PL)
▌ Marcio Tadeu (PL)
▌ Marco Bertaiolli (PSD)
▌ Marco Feliciano (PL)
▌ Marcos Pereira (Republicanos)
▌ Maria Rosas (Republicanos)
▌ Miguel Lombardi (PL)
▌ Milton Vieira (Republicanos)
▌ Nilto Tatto (PT)
▌ Orlando Silva (PCdoB)
▌ Paulo Pereira da Silva (Solidariedade)
▌ Paulo Freire Costa (PL)
▌ Paulo Teixeira (PT)
▌ Renata Abreu (PODE)
▌ Ricardo Izar (PP)
▌ Roberto Alves (Republicanos)
▌ Roberto de Lucena (Republicanos)
▌ Roberto Peternelli (UNIÃO)
▌ Rodrigo Agostinho (PSB)
▌ Rosana Valle (PL)
▌ Rui Falcão (PT)
▌ Sâmia Bomfim (PSOL)
▌ Samuel Moreira (PSDB)
▌ Tabata Amaral (PSB)
▌ Tiririca (PL)
▌ Vanderlei Macris (PSDB)
▌ Vicente Paulo da Silva (PT)
▌ Vinicius Carvalho (Republicanos)
▌ Vinicius Poit (NOVO)
▌ Vitor Lippi (PSDB)

==== Sergipe ====
▌ Bosco Costa (PL)
▌ Fábio Henrique (UNIÃO)
▌ Fábio Mitidieri (PSD), until 1 January 2023

▌ Alexandre Figueiredo (PSD), from 1 January 2023

▌ Fábio Reis (PSD)
▌ João Daniel (PT)
▌ Laercio Oliveira (PP)
▌ Gustinho Ribeiro (Republicanos)
▌ Valdevan de Jesus (PL)

==== Tocantins ====
▌ Carlos Henrique Gaguim (UNIÃO)
▌ Célio Moura (PT)
▌ Dorinha Rezende (UNIÃO)
▌ Dulce Miranda (MDB)
▌ Eli Borges (PL)
▌ Osires Damaso (PSC)
▌ Tiago Dimas (PODE)
▌ Vicentinho Júnior (PL)

== Changes in membership ==
=== Chamber of Deputies ===
State	Vacated by	Reason for change	Successor (Note: The successor is always the first substitute available of the party's coalition in the state. He may or may not be from the same party of the first holder.)	Date of succerssor's formal installation
Alagoas	João Henrique Caldas (PSB)	Resigned on 1 January 2021 to become Mayor of Maceió. Successor was seated on the same day.	Pedro Vilela (PSDB)	1 January 2021
Amapá	Vinicius Gurgel (PL)	Licensed since 5 December 2019 for medical treatment. Successor was seated on the same day.	Patricia Ferraz (PODE)	5 December 2019
Bahia	Josias Gomes (PT)	Licensed since 13 March 2019 to become State Secretary of Rural Development of Bahia. Successor was seated on the same day.	Joseildo Ramos (PT)	13 March 2019
Bahia	Sérgio Brito (PSD)	Licensed from 14 March to 2 October 2019 to become State Secretary of Urban Development of Bahia. Successor was seated on the same day.	Paulo Magalhães (PSD)	14 March 2019
Bahia	Paulo Magalhães (PSD)	Holder returned to his seat.	Sérgio Brito (PSD)	2 October 2019
Bahia	Nelson Pelegrino (PT)	Licensed since 28 November 2019 to become State Secretary of Urban Development of Bahia. Successor was seated on the same day.	Paulo Magalhães (PSD)	28 November 2019
Ceará	Mauro Benevides Filho (PDT)	Licensed from 28 May to 1 October 2019 to become State Secretary of Planning and Management of Ceará. Successor was seated on the same day.	Aníbal Gomes (DEM)	28 May 2019
Ceará	Aníbal Gomes (DEM)	Holder returned to his seat.	Mauro Benevides Filho (PSB)	1 October 2019
Espírito Santo	Paulo Foletto (PSB)	Licensed since 5 February 2019 to become State Secretary of Agriculture, Supply, Aquaculture and Fishing of Espírito Santo. Successor was seated on the same day.	Ted Conti (PSB)	5 February 2019
Espírito Santo	Sergio Vidigal (PDT)	Resigned on 31 December 2020 to become Mayor of Vitória. Successor was seated on the next day	Neucimar Fraga (PSD)	1 January 2021
Maranhão	Rubens Pereira Júnior (PCdoB)	Licensed since 25 February 2019 to become State Secretary of Cities and Urban Development of Maranhão. Second substitute was seated weeks later.	Gastão Vieira (PROS)	19 March 2019
Maranhão	Cleber Verde (REPUBLICANOS)	Licensed since 2 December 2019 for personal reasons. Successor was seated days later.	Antonio Gonçalo (REPUBLICANOS)	4 December 2019
Maranhão	Josimar Maranhãozinho (PL)	Licensed from 11 February to 11 June 2020 due to medical treatment and personal issues. Successor was seated days later.	Paulo Marinho Jr. (PL)	13 February 2020
Maranhão	Paulo Marinho Jr. (PL)	Holder returned to his seat.	Josimar Maranhãozinho (PL)	11 June 2020
Maranhão	Eduardo Braide (PODE)	Resigned on 1 January 2021 to become Mayor of São Luis. Successor was seated on the same day.	Josivaldo Santos (PODE)	1 January 2021
Mato Grosso do Sul	Tereza Cristina (DEM)	Licensed from 1 January 2019 to 9 July 2019 to become Minister of Agriculture, Livestock and Supply. Successor was seated in the beginning of the Legislature.	Geraldo Resende (PSDB)	1 February 2019
Mato Grosso do Sul	Geraldo Resende (PSDB)	Holder returned to her seat.	Tereza Cristina (DEM)	9 July 2019
Mato Grosso do Sul	Tereza Cristina (DEM)	Licensed from 16 July 2019 to 6 August 2019 to become Minister of Agriculture, Livestock and Supply. Successor was seated on the same day.	Geraldo Resende (PSDB)	16 July 2019
Mato Grosso do Sul	Geraldo Resende (PSDB)	Holder returned to her seat.	Tereza Cristina (DEM)	6 August 2019
Mato Grosso do Sul	Tereza Cristina (DEM)	Licensed since 8 August 2019 to become Minister of Agriculture, Livestock and Supply. Second substitute was seated on the next day.	Bia Cavassa (PSDB)	9 August 2019
Minas Gerais	Marcelo Álvaro Antônio (PSL)	Licensed from 1 January 2019 to 9 July 2019 to become Minister of Tourism. Successor was seated in the beginning of the Legislature.	Eneias Reis (PSL)	1 February 2019
Minas Gerais	Eneias Reis (PSL)	Holder returned to his seat.	Marcelo Álvaro Antônio (PSL)	9 July 2019
Minas Gerais	Marcelo Álvaro Antônio (PSL)	Licensed from 16 July 2019 to 6 August 2019 to become Minister of Tourism. Successor was seated on the same day.	Eneias Reis (PSL)	16 July 2019
Minas Gerais	Eneias Reis (PSL)	Holder returned to his seat.	Marcelo Álvaro Antônio (PSL)	6 July 2019
Minas Gerais	Marcelo Álvaro Antônio (PSL)	Licensed since 8 August 2019 to become Minister of Tourism. Successor was seated on the same day.	Eneias Reis (PSL)	8 August 2019
Minas Gerais	Bilac Pinto (DEM)	Licensed since 29 August 2019 to become State Secretary of Government of Minas Gerais. Second substitute was seated on the same day.	Fabiano Tolentino (CIDADANIA)	29 August 2019
Minas Gerais	Eneias Reis (PSL)	Holder returned to his seat.	Marcelo Álvaro Antônio (PSL)	9 December 2020
Minas Gerais	Margarida Salomão (PT)	Resigned on 1 January 2021 to become Mayor of Juíz de Fora. Successor was seated on the same day.	Aelton Freitas (PL)	1 January 2021
Pará	Edmilson Rodrigues (PSOL)	Resigned on 1 January 2021 to become Mayor of Belém. Successor was seated on the same day.	Vivi Reis (PSOL)	1 January 2021
Paraná	Ney Leprevost (PSD)	Licensed since 4 February 2019 to become State Secretary of Justice, Labor and Human Rights of Paraná. Successor was seated on the next day.	Evandro Roman (PSD)	5 February 2019
Paraná	Sandro Alex (PSD)	Licensed since 4 February 2019 to become State Secretary of Infrastructure and Logistics of Paraná. Second substitute was seated on the next day.	Reinhold Stephanes Junior (PSD)	5 February 2019
Pernambuco	João Campos (PSB)	Resigned on 20 December 2020 to become Mayor of Recife. Successor was seated weeks later.	Milton Coelho (PSB)	1 January 2021
Piauí	Fábio Abreu (PL)	Licensed since 28 March 2019 to become State Secretary of Public Security of Piauí. Second substitute was seated months later.	Paes Landim (PTB)	11 June 2019
Rio de Janeiro	Jean Wyllys (PSOL)	Resigned 24 January 2019 due to death threats received by him. Successor was seated in the beginning of the Legislature.	David Miranda (PSOL)	1 February 2019
Rio de Janeiro	Wagner Montes (REPUBLICANOS)	Died 26 January 2019. Successor was seated in the beginning of the Legislature.	Jorge Braz (REPUBLICANOS)	1 February 2019
Rio de Janeiro	Fabiana Poubel (PSL)	Licensed from 7 August to 24 October 2019 to become State Secretary of Vitimization and Support to the Person with Disabilities of Rio de Janeiro. Successor was seated on the same day.	Ricardo Perica (PSL)	7 August 2019
Rio de Janeiro	Ricardo Perica (PSL)	Holder returned to her seat.	Fabiana Poubel (PSL)	24 October 2019
Rio de Janeiro	Altineu Côrtes (PL)	Licensed since 18 December 2019 to become State Secretary of Environment and Sustainability of Rio de Janeiro. Successor was seated on the same day.	Marcus Gomes (PL)	18 December 2019
Rio de Janeiro	Alexandre Serfiotis (PSD)	Resigned on 1 January 2021 to become Mayor of Porto Real. Successor was seated on the same day.	Pedro Augusto (PSD)	1 January 2021
Rio de Janeiro	Wladimir Garotinho (PSD)	Resigned on 1 January 2021 to become Mayor of Campos dos Goytacazes. Successor was seated on the same day.	Ricardo Correa (PATRI)	1 January 2021
Rio de Janeiro	Pedro Paulo (DEM)	Licensed since 1 January 2021 to become Municipal Secretary of Finances and Planning of Rio de Janeiro. Successor was seated on the next day.	Marcos Soares (DEM)	2 January 2021
Rio de Janeiro	Marcelo Calero (CDN)	Licensed since 1 January 2021 to become Municipal Secretary of Government and Public Integrity of Rio de Janeiro. Successor was seated on the next day.	Otavio Leite (PSDB)	2 January 2021
Rio de Janeiro	Daniel Silveira (PSL)	Arrested on 16 February 2021 by order of Supreme Court Justice Alexandre de Moraes. Successor was not seated.	—N/a	—N/a
Rio de Janeiro	Flordelis (PSD)	Removed on 11 August 2021 for breaching parliamentary decorum. Successor was seated weeks later.	Jones Moura (PSD)	15 September 2021
Rio Grande do Sul	Onyx Lorenzoni (DEM)	Licensed since 1 January 2019 to become Chief of Staff of the Presidency. Successor was seated in the beginning of the Legislature.	Marcelo Brum (PSL)	1 February 2019
Rio Grande do Sul	Osmar Terra (MDB)	Licensed from 1 January 2019 to 9 July 2019 to become Minister of Citizenship. Successor was seated in the beginning of the Legislature.	Darcísio Perondi (MDB)	1 February 2019
Rio Grande do Sul	Covatti Filho (PP)	Licensed since 12 February 2019 to become State Secretary of Agriculture, Livestock and Rural Development of Rio Grande do Sul; Successor was seated on the same day.	Ronaldo Santini (PTB)	12 February 2019
Rio Grande do Sul	Marcelo Brum (PSL)	Holder returned to his seat.	Onyx Lorenzoni (DEM)	9 July 2019
Rio Grande do Sul	Onyx Lorenzoni (DEM)	Licensed from 16 July 2019 to 6 August 2019 to become Chief of Staff of the Presidency. Successor was seated on the same day.	Marcelo Brum (PSL)	16 July 2019
Rio Grande do Sul	Marcelo Brum (PSL)	Holder returned to his seat.	Onyx Lorenzoni (DEM)	6 August 2019
Rio Grande do Sul	Onyx Lorenzoni (DEM)	Licensed since 8 August 2019 to become Chief of Staff of the Presidency. Successor was seated on the same day.	Marcelo Brum (PSL)	8 August 2019
Rio Grande do Sul	Covatti Filho (PP)	Licensed since 3 February 2020 to become State Secretary of Agriculture, Livestock and Rural Development of Rio Grande do Sul. Successor was seated on the same day.	Ronaldo Santini (PTB)	3 February 2020
Rio Grande do Sul	Darcísio Perondi (MDB)	Holder returned to his seat.	Osmar Terra (MDB)	18 February 2020
São Paulo	Guilherme Mussi (PP)	Licensed from 13 August to 13 December 2019 due to medical treatment and personal reasons. Successor was seated on the next week.	Miguel Haddad (PSDB)	20 August 2019
São Paulo	Carla Zambelli (PSL)	Licensed from 29 October to 5 November 2019 due to pregnancy. Successor was not seated.	—N/a	—N/a
São Paulo	Eli Corrêa Filho (DEM)	Licensed since 12 December 2019 due to personal reason and medical treatment. Successor was seated on the next day.	Miguel Haddad (PSDB)	13 December 2019
São Paulo	Jefferson Campos (PSB)	Licensed since 16 December 2019 for personal reasons and medical treatment. Successor was seated on the next day.	Luiz Lauro Filho (PSDB)	17 December 2019
São Paulo	Luiz Flávio Gomes (PSB)	Licensed from 12 February to 1 April 2020. Died on 1 April 2020. Successor was seated in February 2020 and became holder in April 2020.	Ricardo Silva (PSB)	17 February 2020
São Paulo	Renata Abreu (PODE)	Licensed since 3 March 2020 for medical treatment and parental leave. Successor was seated on the next day.	Sinval Malheiros (PODE)	4 March 2020

=== Federal Senate ===
State	Vacated by	Reason for change	Successor (Note: The successor is always the first substitute available of the party's coalition in the state. He may or may not be from the same party of the first holder.)	Date of succerssor's formal installation
Acre	Gladson Cameli (PP)	Resigned on 1 January 2019 to take office as Governor of Acre. Successor was seated days later.	Mailza Gomes (PP)	3 January 2019
Alagoas	Fernando Collor (PROS)	Licensed since 3 April 2019 for personal reasons. Successor was seated on the same day.	Renilde Bulhões (PROS)	3 April 2019
Alagoas	Renilde Bulhões (PROS)	Holder returned to his seat.	Fernando Collor (PROS)	1 August 2019
Amapá	Lucas Barreto (PSD)	Licensed from 16 December 2019 to 20 April 2020 due to health issues. Successor was seated on the next day.	Paulo Albuquerque (PSD)	17 December 2019
Amapá	Paulo Albuquerque (PSD)	Holder returned to his seat.	Lucas Barreto (PSD)	20 April 2020
Ceará	Cid Gomes (PDT)	Licensed from 11 December 2019 to 11 April 2020 for personal reasons. Successor was seated on the same day.	Prisco Bezerra (PDT)	11 December 2019
Ceará	Prisco Bezerra (PDT)	Holder returned to his seat.	Cid Gomes (PDT)	11 April 2020
Espírito Santo	Rose de Freitas (PODE)	Licensed from 19 November 2019 to 26 March 2020 due to health issues. Successor was seated on the next day.	Luiz Pastore (MDB)	20 December 2019
Espírito Santo	Luiz Pastore (MDB)	Holder returned to his seat.	Rose de Freitas (PODE)	26 March 2020
Goiás	Ronaldo Caiado (DEM)	Resigned on 1 January 2019 to take office as Governor of Goiás. Successor was seated on the next day.	Luiz do Carmo (MDB)	2 January 2019
Mato Grosso	Selma Arruda (PODE)	Senator was removed from office by the Director's Board of the Senate after decision of the Superior Electoral Court. Successor was seated days later.	Carlos Fávaro (PSD) (Note: Carlos Fávaro placed 3rd in the 2018 Senate election, but served as Senator until the next special election.)	17 April 2020
Minas Gerais	Antônio Anastasia (PSD)	Resigned on 2 February 2022 to take office as Justice of the Federal Court of Accounts. Successor was seated on the same day.	Alexandre Silveira (PSD)	2 February 2022
Paraíba	Daniella Ribeiro (PP)	Licensed from September 2020 to January 2021 for personal reasons. Successor was seated on the same day.	Diego Tavares (PP)	23 September 2020
Paraíba	Veneziano Vital do Rêgo (MDB)	Licensed from September 2020 to January 2021 for personal reasons Successor was seated on the next week.	Ney Suassuna (REP)	29 September 2020
Paraíba	José Maranhão (MDB)	Licensed on 6 January 2021 to begin treatment against COVID-19; Successor was seated on the next week. Maranhão died on 6 February 2021 and successor assumed his seat until the end of the term.	Nilda Gondim (MDB)	12 January 2021
Paraíba	Diego Tavares (PP)	Holder returned to her seat	Daniella Ribeiro (PP)	22 January 2021
Paraíba	Ney Suassuna (REP)	Holder returned to his seat	Veneziano Vital do Rêgo (MDB)	22 January 2021
Piauí	Ciro Nogueira (PP)	Licensed on 27 July 2021 to assume office as Chief of Staff of the Presidency; Successor was seated of the following day	Eliane Nogueira (PP)	28 July 2021
Rio de Janeiro	Arolde de Oliveira (PSD)	Died on 21 October 2020 due to complications caused by COVID-19. Successor was seated weeks later.	Carlos Portinho (PSD)	3 November 2020
Rio Grande do Norte	Fátima Bezerra (PT)	Resigned on 1 January 2019 to take office as Governor of Rio Grande do Norte. Successor was seated days later.	Jean Paul Prates (PT)	3 January 2019
Roraima	Chico Rodrigues (DEM)	Licensed from October 2020 to February 2021 for personal reasons. Successor wasn't seated.	—N/a	—N/a
Roraima	—N/a	Holder returned to his seat.	Chico Rodrigues (DEM)	18 February 2021
São Paulo	Sérgio Olímpio (PSL)	Died on 18 March 2021 due to complication caused by COVID-19. Successor was seated two weeks later.	Alexandre Giordano (PSL)	31 March 2021
São Paulo	José Serra (PSDB)	Licensed on 9 August 2021 to begin treatment against Parkinson's disease. Successor was seated days later.	José Aníbal (PSDB)	11 August 2021

== Defections and suspensions ==
=== Federal Senate ===
Name	Date	From	To	Constituency	Reason
Alessandro Vieira	20 November 2018	Sustainability Network	Cidadania	Sergipe	Party didn't reach the election threshold, allowing him to leave the party without any penalty.
Fernando Collor	15 January 2019	Christian Labour Party	Republican Party of the Social Order	Alagoas	Party didn't reach the election threshold, allowing him to leave the party without any penalty.
Jorge Kajuru	15 January 2019	Progressive Republican Party	Brazilian Socialist Party	Goiás	Party didn't reach the election threshold, allowing him to leave the party without any penalty. Party was also fused with Patriota after the election.
Jorge Kajuru	9 August 2019	Brazilian Socialist Party	Patriota	Goiás	Kajuru left the party after disagreements involving his alignment with President Jair Bolsonaro.
Jorge Kajuru	18 September 2019	Patriota	Cidadania	Goiás	Senator left the party to look for more seats in the Senate Committees.
Eduardo Gomes	29 January 2019	Solidariedade	Brazilian Democratic Movement	Tocantins	Senator left the party aiming a seat in the Senate Director's Board.
Nelsinho Trad	30 January 2019	Brazilian Labour Party	Social Democratic Party	Mato Grosso do Sul	Left the party stating that he was looking for an "expansion of important political spaces in the House".
Lucas Barreto	30 January 2019	Brazilian Labour Party	Social Democratic Party	Amapá	Joined Social Democratic in January 2019.
Telmário Mota	31 January 2019	Brazilian Labour Party	Republican Party of the Social Order	Roraima	Resigned from the party.
Zenaide Maia	31 January 2019	Humanist Party of Solidarity	Republican Party of the Social Order	Rio Grande do Norte	Party didn't reach the election threshold, allowing her to leave the party without any penalty. Party was also fused with Podemos.
Eduardo Girão	2 February 2019	Republican Party of the Social Order	Podemos	Ceará	Senator stated he was "looking for more protagonism".
Styvenson Valentim	4 February 2019	Sustainability Network	Podemos	Rio Grande do Norte	Party didn't reach the election threshold, allowing him to leave the party without any penalty.
Lasier Martins	5 February 2019	Social Democratic Party	Podemos	Rio Grande do Sul	Senator stated he left Social Democratic for "personal reasons".
Marcos do Val	14 August 2019	Cidadania	Podemos	Espírito Santo	Joined Podemos in August 2019 after an invitation made by senator Alvaro Dias.
José Reguffe	18 September 2019	Independent	Podemos	Federal District	Joined Podemos in September 2019.
Selma Arruda	18 September 2019	Social Liberal Party	Podemos	Mato Grosso	Resigned from Social Liberal citing "pressure coming from everywhere".
Flávio Bolsonaro	12 November 2019	Social Liberal Party	Independent	Rio de Janeiro	Resigned from Social Liberal for the creation of Alliance for Brazil.
Flávio Bolsonaro	27 March 2020	Independent	Republicanos	Rio de Janeiro	Joined Republicanos in March 2020.
Flávio Bolsonaro	31 May 2021	Republicanos	Patriota	Rio de Janeiro	Joined Patriota in May 2021.
Antônio Anastasia	12 February 2020	Brazilian Social Democracy Party	Social Democratic Party	Minas Gerais	Resigned from Brazilian Social Democracy in February 2020.
Vanderlan Cardoso	3 March 2020	Progressistas	Social Democratic Party	Goiás	Resigned from Progressistas due to the party's approach to Governor Ronaldo Caiado.
Kátia Abreu	11 March 2020	Democratic Labour Party	Progressistas	Tocantins	Resigned from Democratic Labour in March 2020.
Flávio Arns	31 August 2020	Sustainability Network	Podemos	Paraná	Resigned from Sustainability Network in August 2020.
Elmano Férrer	29 September 2020	Progressistas	Podemos	Piauí	Resigned from Progressistas in September 2020.
Carlos Portinho	28 December 2020	Social Democratic Party	Liberal Party	Rio de Janeiro	Resigned from Social Democratic in December 2020.
Rose de Freitas	12 January 2021	Podemos	Brazilian Democratic Movement	Espírito Santo	Resigned from Podemos in January 2021.
Veneziano Vital do Rêgo	12 January 2021	Brazilian Socialist Party	Brazilian Democratic Movement	Paraíba	Resigned from Brazilian Socialist in January 2021.
Romário Faria	8 April 2021	Podemos	Liberal Party	Rio de Janeiro	Defected from Podemos to the Liberal Party in April 2021.
Márcio Bittar	23 September 2021	Brazilian Democratic Movement	Social Liberal Party	Acre	Defected from MDB to Social Liberal in September 2021.
Rodrigo Pacheco	27 October 2021	Democrats	Social Democratic Party	Minas Gerais	Defected to Social Democratic to run for President in 2022.

=== Chamber of Deputies ===
Name	Date	From	To	Constituency	Reason
Bia Kicis	17 January 2019	Progressive Republican Party	Social Liberal Party	Federal District	Party didn't reach the election threshold, allowing her to leave the party without any penalty. Party was also fused with Patriota.
Alex Santana	17 July 2019	Democratic Labor Party	Independent	Bahia	Suspended from the party after disrespecting its decision to vote against the Social Security Reform.
Flávio Nogueira	17 July 2019	Democratic Labor Party	Independent	Piauí	Suspended from the party after disrespecting its decision to vote against the Social Security Reform.
Gil Cutrim	17 July 2019	Democratic Labor Party	Independent	Maranhão	Suspended from the party after disrespecting its decision to vote against the Social Security Reform.
Jesus Sérgio	17 July 2019	Democratic Labor Party	Independent	Acre	Suspended from the party after disrespecting its decision to vote against the Social Security Reform.
Marlon Santos	17 July 2019	Democratic Labor Party	Independent	Rio Grande do Sul	Suspended from the party after disrespecting its decision to vote against the Social Security Reform.
Silvia Cristina	17 July 2019	Democratic Labor Party	Independent	Roraima	Suspended from the party after disrespecting its decision to vote against the Social Security Reform.
Subtenente Gonzaga	17 July 2019	Democratic Labor Party	Independent	Minas Gerais	Suspended from the party after disrespecting its decision to vote against the Social Security Reform.
Tabata Amaral	17 July 2019	Democratic Labor Party	Independent	São Paulo	Suspended from the party after disrespecting its decision to vote against the Social Security Reform.
Alexandre Frota	13 August 2019	Social Liberal Party	Independent	São Paulo	Expelled from Social Liberal in August 2019.
Alexandre Frota	16 August 2019	Independent	Brazilian Social Democracy Party	São Paulo	Joined Brazilian Social Democracy after critics against Bolsonaro administration.
Átila Lira	30 August 2019	Brazilian Socialist Party	Independent	Piauí	Expelled from the party after disrespecting its decision to vote against the Social Security Reform.
Átila Lira	23 September 2019	Independent	Progressistas	Piauí	Joined Progressistas in September 2019.
Emidinho Madeira	30 August 2019	Brazilian Socialist Party	Independent	Minas Gerais	Suspended from the party after disrespecting its decision to vote against the Social Security Reform.
Felipe Carreras	30 August 2019	Brazilian Socialist Party	Independent	Pernambuco	Suspended from the party after disrespecting its decision to vote against the Social Security Reform.
Felipe Rigoni	30 August 2019	Brazilian Socialist Party	Independent	Espírito Santo	Suspended from the party after disrespecting its decision to vote against the Social Security Reform.
Jefferson Campos	30 August 2019	Brazilian Socialist Party	Independent	São Paulo	Suspended from the party after disrespecting its decision to vote against the Social Security Reform.
Liziane Bayer	30 August 2019	Brazilian Socialist Party	Independent	Rio Grande do Sul	Suspended from the party after disrespecting its decision to vote against the Social Security Reform.
Rodrigo Agostinho	30 August 2019	Brazilian Socialist Party	Independent	São Paulo	Suspended from the party after disrespecting its decision to vote against the Social Security Reform.
Rodrigo Coelho	30 August 2019	Brazilian Socialist Party	Independent	Santa Catarina	Suspended from the party after disrespecting its decision to vote against the Social Security Reform.
Rosana Valle	30 August 2019	Brazilian Socialist Party	Independent	São Paulo	Suspended from the party after disrespecting its decision to vote against the Social Security Reform.
Ted Conti	30 August 2019	Brazilian Socialist Party	Independent	Espírito Santo	Suspended from the party after disrespecting its decision to vote against the Social Security Reform.
Alê Silva	17 October 2019	Social Liberal Party	Independent	Minas Gerais	Suspended from the party in October 2019.
Bibo Nunes	17 October 2019	Social Liberal Party	Independent	Rio Grande do Sul	Suspended from the party in October 2019.
Carla Zambelli	17 October 2019	Social Liberal Party	Independent	São Paulo	Suspended from the party in October 2019.
Carlos Jordy	17 October 2019	Social Liberal Party	Independent	Rio de Janeiro	Suspended from the party in October 2019.
Alê Silva	21 October 2019	Independent	Social Liberal Party	Minas Gerais	Reinstated.
Bibo Nunes	21 October 2019	Independent	Social Liberal Party	Rio Grande do Sul	Reinstated.
Carla Zambelli	21 October 2019	Independent	Social Liberal Party	São Paulo	Reinstated.
Carlos Jordy	21 October 2019	Independent	Social Liberal Party	Rio de Janeiro	Reinstated.
Bia Kicis	12 December 2019	Social Liberal Party	Independent	Federal District	Expelled from Social Liberal in December 2019.
Daniel Silveira	25 February 2021	Social Liberal Party	Brazilian Labour Party	Rio de Janeiro	Resigned from Social Liberal in February 2021.
Marcelo Freixo	11 June 2021	Socialism and Liberty Party	Brazilian Socialist Party	Rio de Janeiro	Resigned from Socialism and Liberty in June 2021.
Rodrigo Maia	14 June 2021	Democrats	Independent	Rio de Janeiro	Expelled from Democrats in June 2021.

== By-elections ==
- 2020 Mato Grosso senatorial special election

== Committees ==
=== Federal Senate ===
Committee	Chair
Agriculture and Agrarian Reform	Acir Gurgacz (PDT-RO)
Constitution, Justice and Citizenship	Davi Alcolumbre (DEM-AP)
Economic Affairs	Otto Alencar (PSD-BA)
Education, Culture and Sports	Marcelo Castro (MDB-PI)
Environment	Jaques Wagner (PT-BA)
Ethics and Parliamentary Decorum	Jayme Campos (DEM-MT)
Foreign Affairs and National Defence	Kátia Abreu (PP-TO)
Human Rights and Participative Legislation	Humberto Costa (PT-PE)
Infrastructure Services	Dário Berger (MDB-SC)
Regional Development and Tourism	Fernando Collor (PROS-AL)
Science, Technology, Innovation, Communication and Computing	Rodrigo Cunha (PSDB-AL)
Social Affairs	Sérgio Petecão (PSD-AC)
Transparency, Governance, Inspection and Control and Consumer Defence	José Reguffe (PODE-DF)

=== Chamber of Deputies ===
Committee	Chair
Agriculture, Livestock, Supply and Rural Development	Aline Sleutjes (PSL-PR)
Consumer Defence	Celso Russomanno (REPUBLICANOS-SP)
Constitution, Justice and Citizenship	Bia Kicis (PSL-DF)
Culture	Alice Portugal (PCdoB-BA)
Defense of Women Rights	Elcione Barbalho (MDB-PA)
Defense of Elderly Rights	Dr. Frederico (PATRI-MG)
Defense of People with Disabilities Rights	Rejane Dias (PT-PI)
Economic Development, Industry, Trade and Services	Otto Alencar Filho (PSD-BA)
Education	Dorinha Seabra Rezende (DEM-TO)
Environment and Sustainable Development	Carla Zambelli (PSL-SP)
Finances and Taxation	Júlio Cesar (PSD-PI)
Financial Supervision and Control	Aureo Ribeiro (SOLIDARIEDADE-RJ)
Foreign Affairs and National Defence	Aécio Neves (PSDB-MG)
Human Rights and Minorities	Carlos Veras (PT-PE)
Labour, Administration and Public Service	Afonso Motta (PDT-RS)
Mines and Energy	Edio Lopes (PL-RR)
National Integration, Regional Development and Amazon	Cristiano Vale (PL-PA)
Participative Legislation	Waldenor Pereira (PT-BA)
Public Security and Fight Against Organized Crime	Emanuel Pinheiro Neto (PTB-MT)
Roads and Transports	Gutemberg Reis (MDB-RJ)
Science and Technology, Communication and Computing	Aliel Machado (PSB-PR)
Social Security and Family	Dr. Luizinho (PP-RJ)
Sports	Felipe Carreras (PSB-PE)
Tourism	João Carlos Bacelar Batista (PODE-BA)
Urban Development	José Priante (MDB-PA)

=== Parliamentary Inquiry Committees ===
Committee	Reason	Chair	Rapporteur	House	Status
Brumadinho dam disaster	Investigate the causes of the dam disruption of Mina Córrego do Feijão on 25 January 2019.	Rogério Correa (PT-MG)	Júlio Delgado (PSB-MG)	Chamber of Deputies	Finished
Illicit practices in BNDES	Investigate illicit practices occurred in the Brazilian Development Bank between 2003 and 2015.	Vanderlei Macris (PSDB-SP)	Altineu Côrtes (PL-RJ)	Chamber of Deputies	Finished
Fake news	Investigate the spread of fake news during the 2018 election.	Angelo Coronel (PSD-BA)	Lídice da Mata (PSB-BA)	National Congress	Suspended
Oil leak in the Northeast	Investigate the oil leak in the beaches of Brazil's Northeast region.	Herculano Passos (MDB-SP)	Vacant (Note: Dep. João Campos (PSB-PE) resigned from his term to take office as Mayor of Recife on 1 January 2021.)	Chamber of Deputies	Finished
Chapecoense flight crash aftermath	Oversight the situation of families of the victims of the LaMia Flight 2933 crash on 28 November 2016.	Jorginho Mello (PL-SC)	Izalci Lucas (PSDB-DF)	Senate	Active
Amazon rainforest wildfires	Investigate the causes of the increase of slash-and-burn index in the Legal Amazon.	TBA	TBA	Senate	TBI
COVID-19 pandemic in Brazil	Investigate the acts of the federal government to contain the COVID-19 pandemic in Brazil.	Omar Aziz (PSD-AM)	Renan Calheiros (MDB-AL)	Senate	Finished
