= Alê Silva =

Brazilian politician

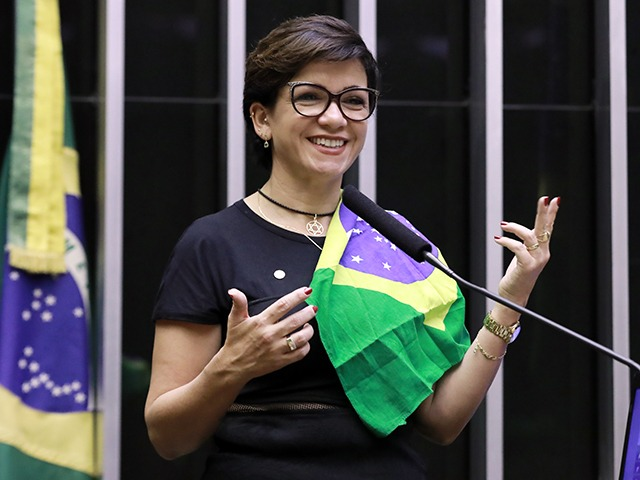
Deputy Alê Silva.

Alessandra da Silva (born 4 July 1974) is a Brazilian federal deputy. She is affiliated to Republicanos.

Born in Petrópolis, she is anti-communist and an ally of Conservative president Jair Bolsonaro.
