= Nivaldo Albuquerque =

Brazilian politician (born 1988)

Member of the Chamber of Deputies
- In office 17 May 2016 – 31 January 2023
- Constituency: Alagoas

Personal details
- Born: 7 January 1988 (age 38)
- Party: Republicans (since 2022)
- Parent: Antonio Albuquerque (father)

Nivaldo Ferreira de Albuquerque Neto (born 7 January 1988) is a Brazilian politician. From 2016 to 2023, he was a member of the Chamber of Deputies. He is the son of Antonio Albuquerque.
