= Charlles Evangelista =

Brazilian politician (born 1984)

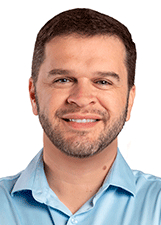
- Evangelista in 2024

Member of the Chamber of Deputies
- In office 1 February 2019 – 31 January 2023
- Constituency: Minas Gerais

Personal details
- Born: 27 December 1984 (age 41)
- Party: Liberal Party (since 2023)

Charlles Thomacelli Evangelista (born 27 December 1984) is a Brazilian politician. From 2019 to 2023, he was a member of the Chamber of Deputies. From 2017 to 2019, he was a municipal councillor of Juiz de Fora.
