= Fernando Monteiro =

Brazilian politician (born 1976)

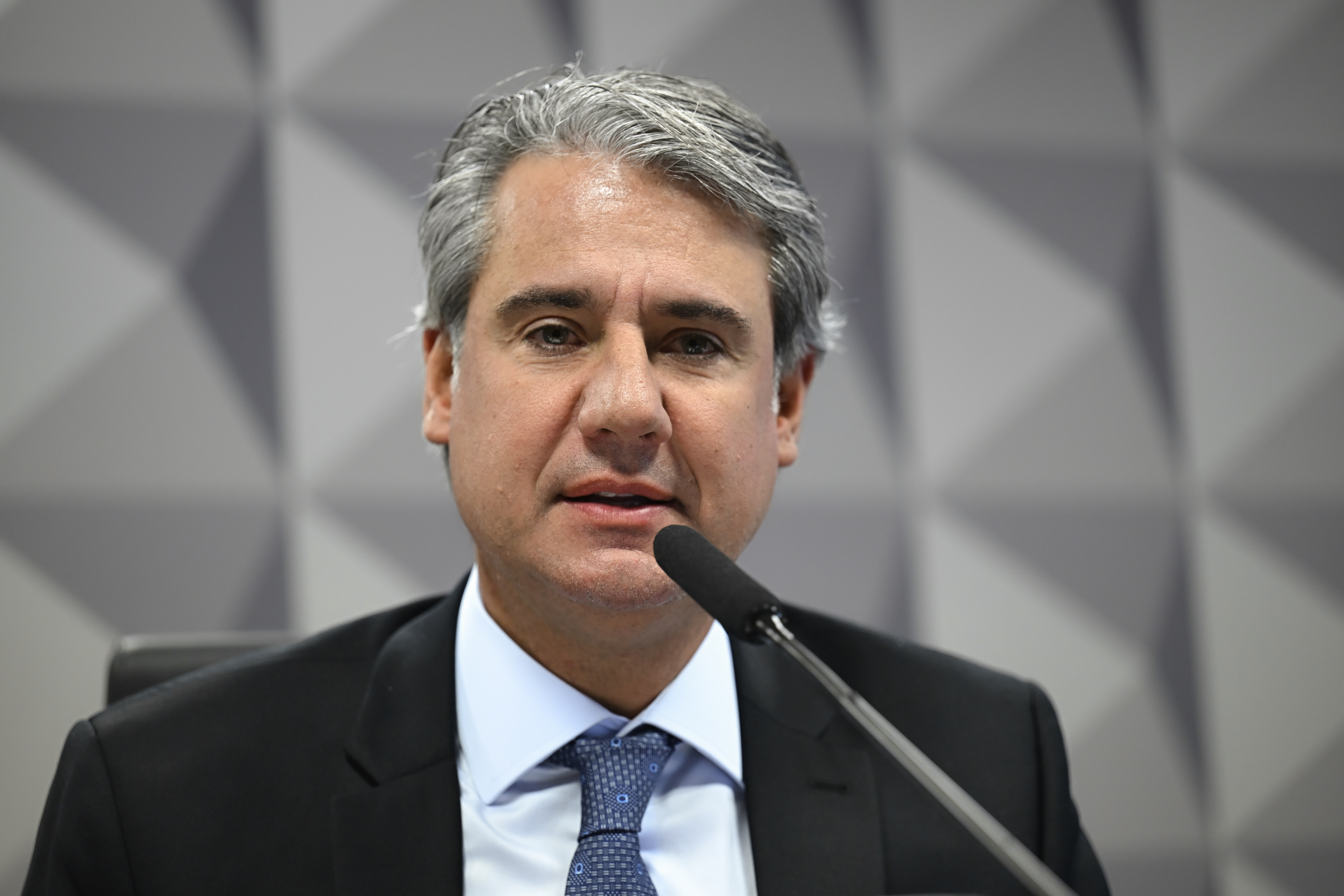
- Monteiro in 2025

Member of the Chamber of Deputies
- Incumbent
- Assumed office 1 February 2019
- Constituency: Pernambuco

Personal details
- Born: 17 September 1976 (age 50)
- Party: Republicans (since 2025)

Fernando Monteiro de Albuquerque (born 17 September 1976) is a Brazilian politician serving as a member of the Chamber of Deputies since 2019. He has been a member of the Republicans since 2025.
