= Eduardo Bismarck =

Brazilian politician (born 1981)

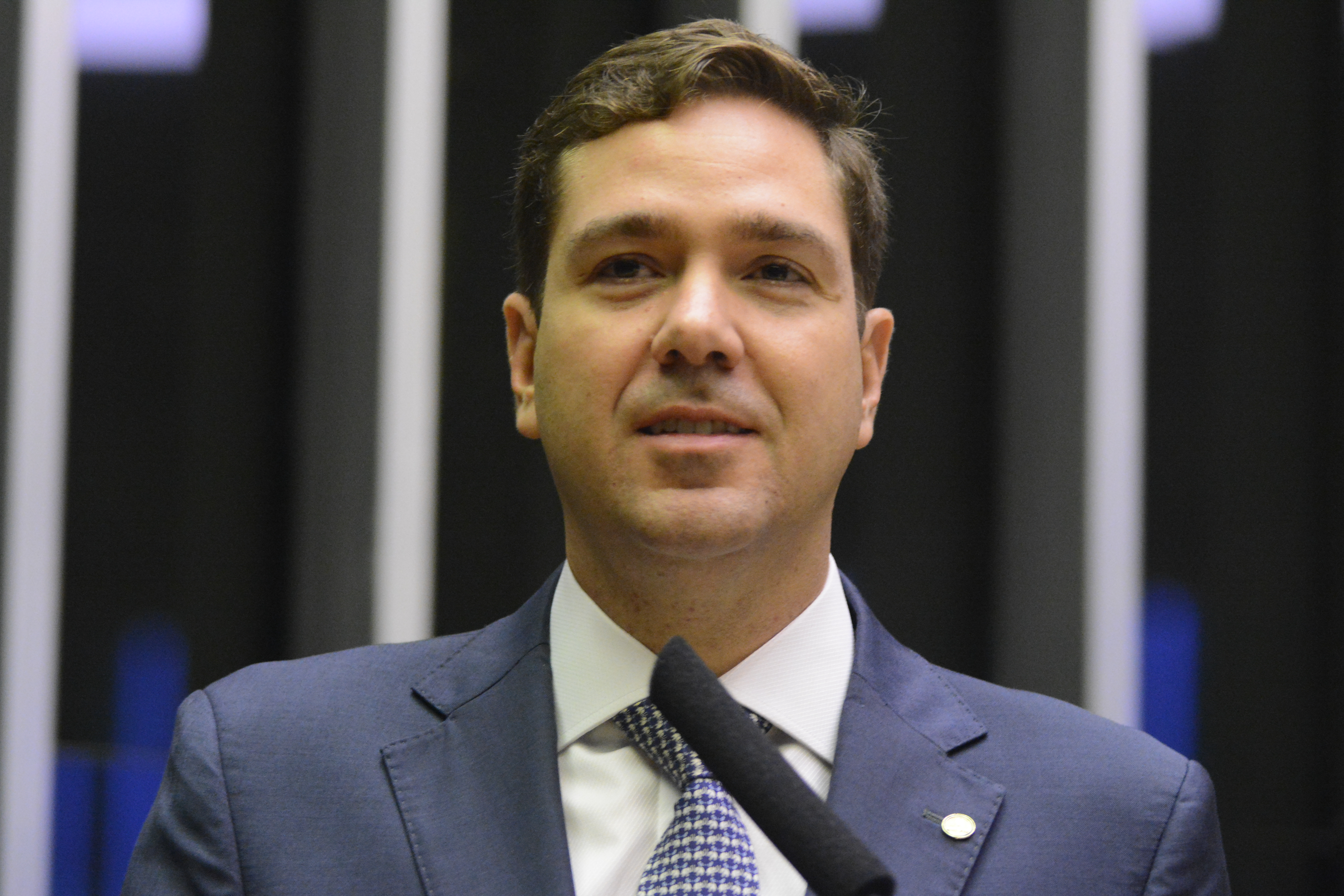
- Bismarck in 2019

Member of the Chamber of Deputies
- Incumbent
- Assumed office 1 February 2019
- Constituency: Ceará

Personal details
- Born: 14 November 1981 (age 44)
- Party: Democratic Labour Party (since 2017)
- Parent: Bismarck Maia (father)

Eduardo Henrique Maia Bismarck (born 14 November 1981) is a Brazilian politician serving as a member of the Chamber of Deputies since 2019. He is the son of Bismarck Maia.
