= Fabio Schiochet =

Brazilian politician (born 1988)

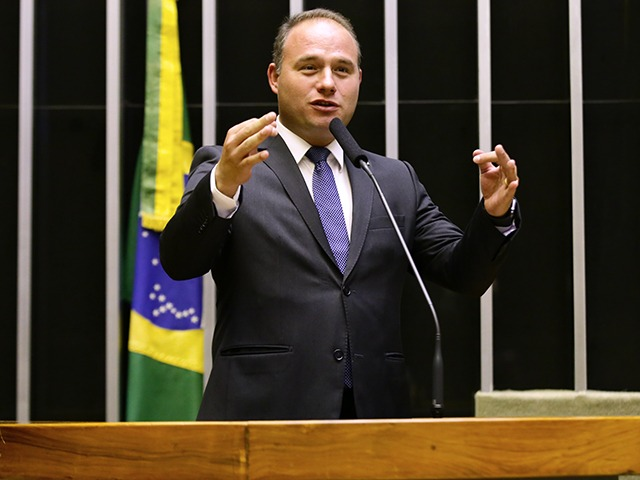
- Schiochet in 2019

Member of the Chamber of Deputies
- Incumbent
- Assumed office 1 February 2019
- Constituency: Santa Catarina

Personal details
- Born: 31 May 1988 (age 38)
- Party: Brazil Union (since 2022)

Fabio Luiz Schiochet Filho (born 31 May 1988) is a Brazilian politician serving as a member of the Chamber of Deputies since 2019. He has served as chairman of the ethics council since 2025.
