= Covatti Filho =

Brazilian politician (born 1987)

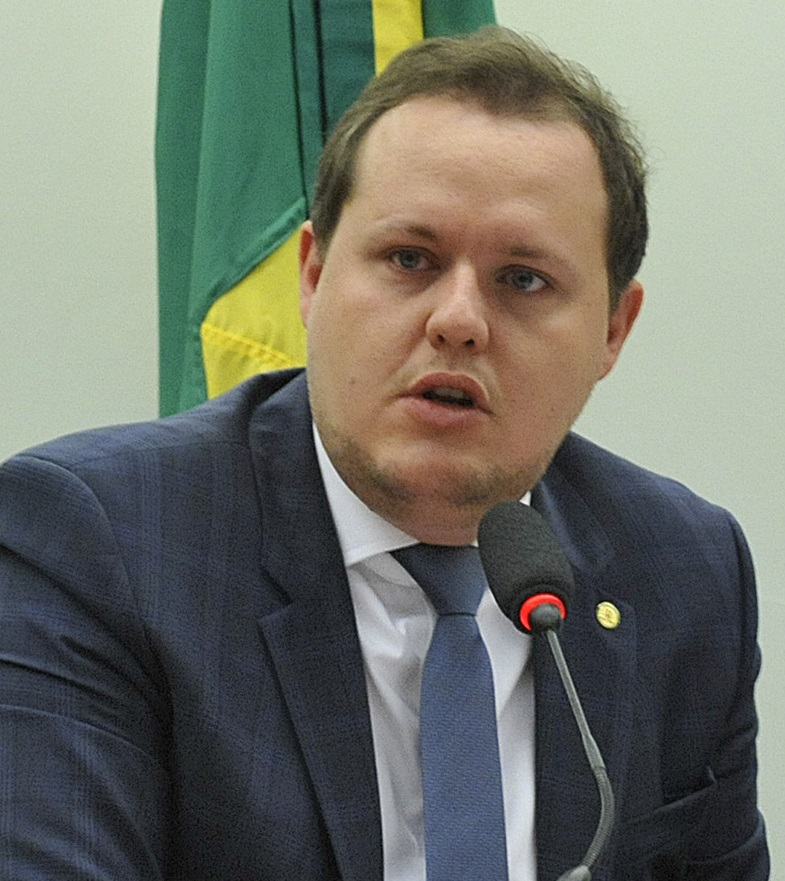

Member of the Chamber of Deputies
- Incumbent
- Assumed office 1 February 2015
- Constituency: Rio Grande do Sul

Personal details
- Born: 25 July 1987 (age 38)
- Party: Progressistas (since 2009)
- Parents: Vilson Covatti (father); Silvana Covatti (mother)

Luis Antonio Franciscatto Covatti, better known as Covatti Filho (born 25 July 1987), is a Brazilian politician serving as a member of the Chamber of Deputies since 2015. He is the son of Vilson Covatti and Silvana Covatti.
