= Pastor Gil =

Brazilian politician (born 1971)

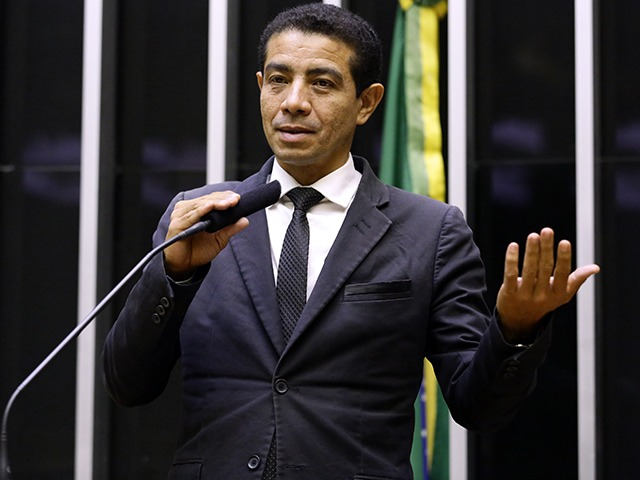
- Gil in 2021

Member of the Chamber of Deputies
- Incumbent
- Assumed office 1 February 2019
- Constituency: Maranhão

Personal details
- Born: 8 November 1971 (age 54)
- Party: Liberal Party (since 2019)

Gildenemir de Lima Sousa (born 8 November 1971), better known as Pastor Gil, is a Brazilian politician serving as a member of the Chamber of Deputies since 2019. He previously served as secretary general of the General Convention of the Assemblies of God of Maranhão.
