= Sargento Fahur =

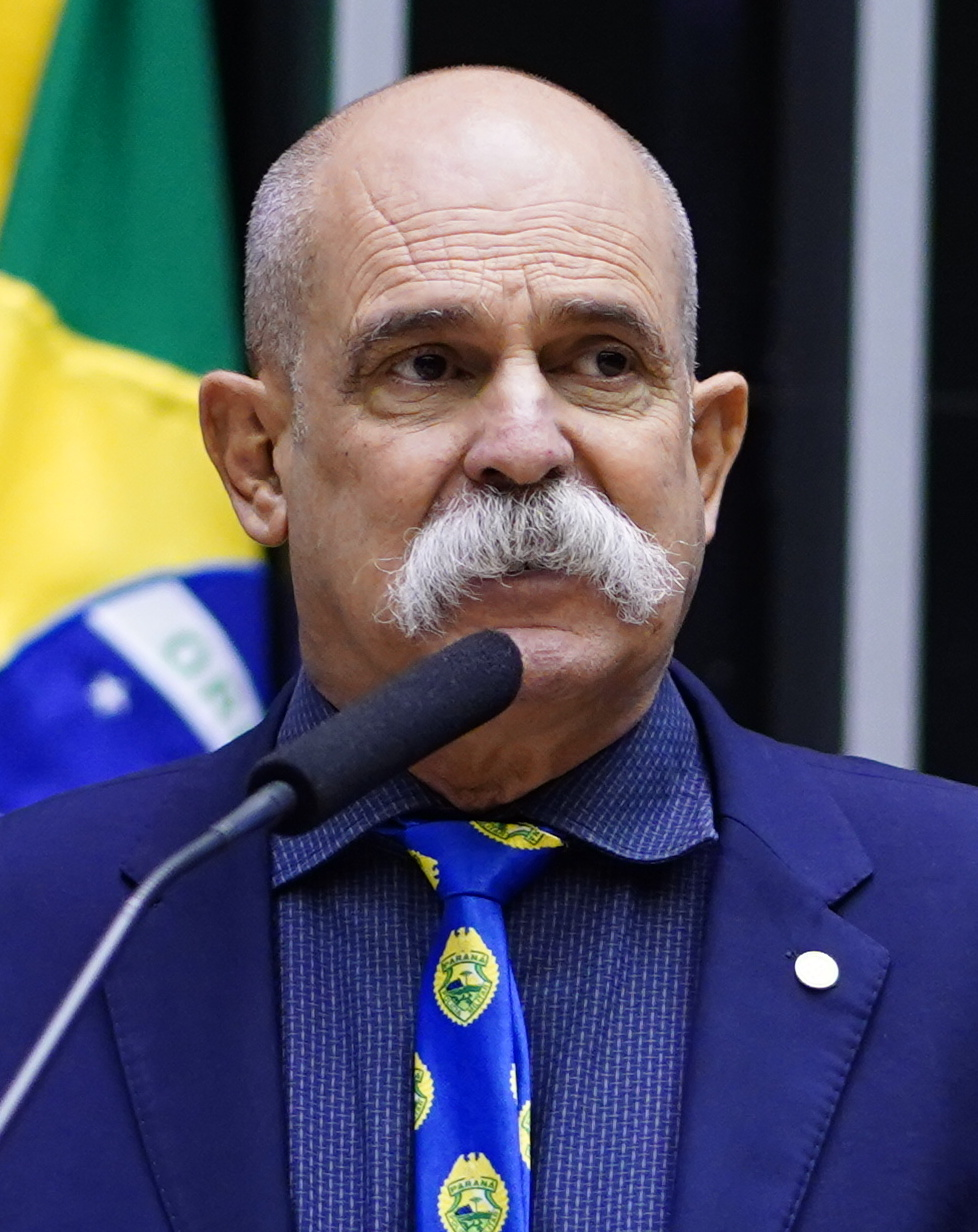
Sargento Fahur

Gilson Cardoso Fahur (born November 6, 1963, in Londrina), better known as Sargento Fahur (English: Sergeant Fahur), is a retired military police officer from the State of Paraná and a Brazilian politician, affiliated with the Liberal Party (PL) and a former member of the ROTAM of the 4th Company of the Paraná State Highway Police (PRE).

In October 2018, he was elected to the federal parliament for the state of Paraná. With 314,963 votes, he was the candidate with the most votes in the state. He was re-elected in the 2022 state election.
