= Sargento Gurgel =

Brazilian politician (born 1980)

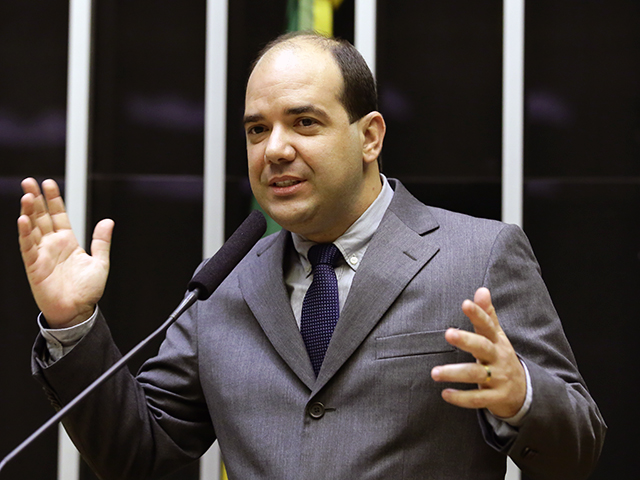
- Gurgel in 2019

Member of the Chamber of Deputies
- In office 1 February 2019 – 31 January 2023
- Constituency: Rio de Janeiro

Personal details
- Born: 2 December 1980 (age 45)
- Party: Liberal Party (since 2022)

João Carlos Soares Gurgel (born 2 December 1980), better known as Sargento Gurgel, is a Brazilian politician. From 2019 to 2023, he was a member of the Chamber of Deputies. He previously served in the Military Police of Rio de Janeiro State.
