= Felipe Rigoni =

Brazilian politician (born 1991)

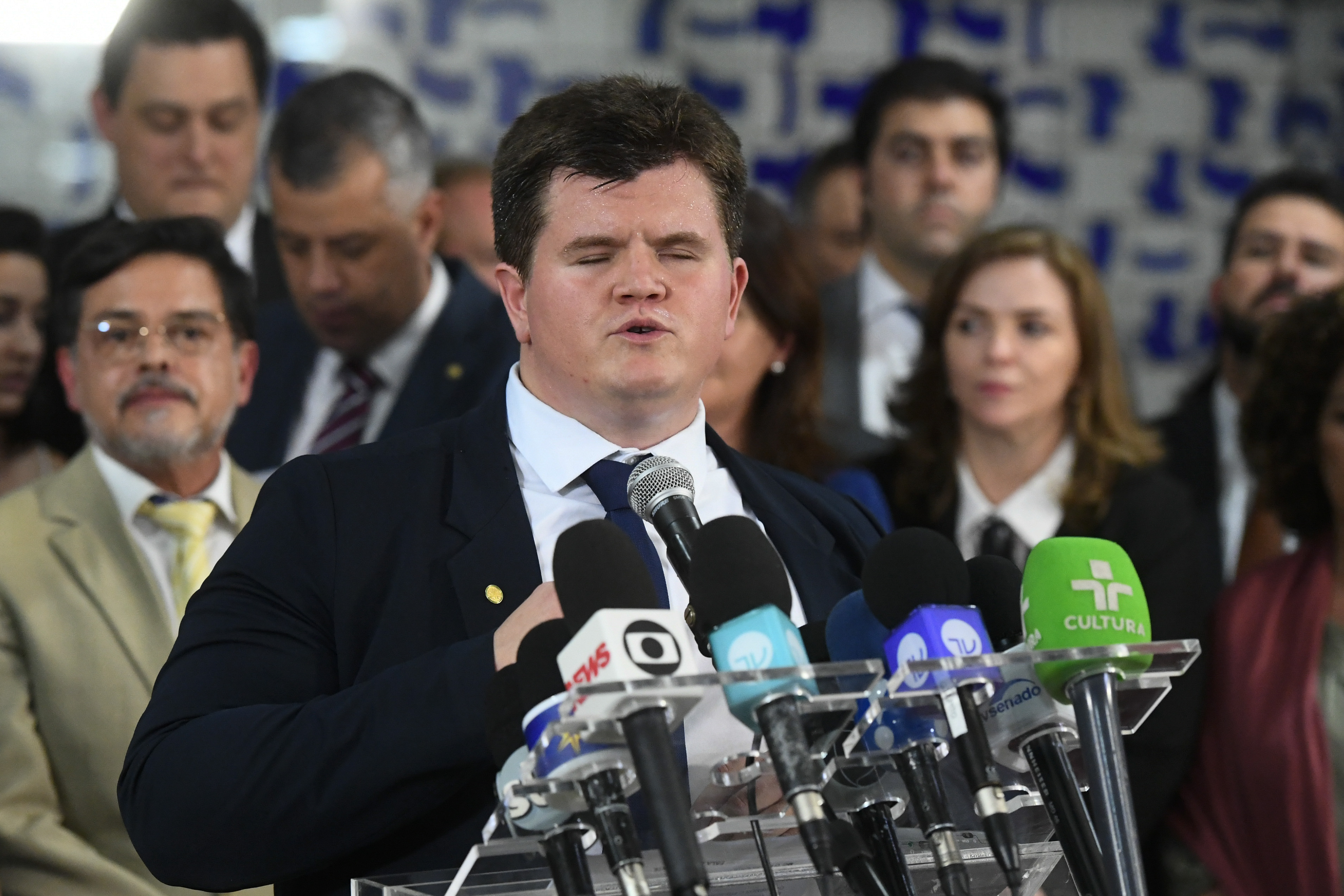
- Rigoni in 2021

Member of the Chamber of Deputies
- In office 1 February 2019 – 31 January 2023
- Constituency: Espírito Santo

Personal details
- Born: 13 June 1991 (age 35)
- Party: Brazil Union (since 2022)

Felipe Rigoni Lopes (born 13 June 1991) is a Brazilian politician serving as secretary of the environment of Espírito Santo since 2023. From 2019 to 2023, he was a member of the Chamber of Deputies.
