= Átila Lira =

Brazilian politician (born 1980)

Member of the Chamber of Deputies
- Incumbent
- Assumed office 1 February 2023
- Constituency: Piauí

Personal details
- Born: 1 April 1980 (age 46)
- Party: Progressistas (since 2022)
- Parent: Átila Freitas Lira (father)

Átila de Melo Lira (born 1 April 1980) is a Brazilian politician serving as a member of the Chamber of Deputies since 2023. He is the son of Átila Freitas Lira.
