= Daniel Trzeciak =

Brazilian politician (born 1986)

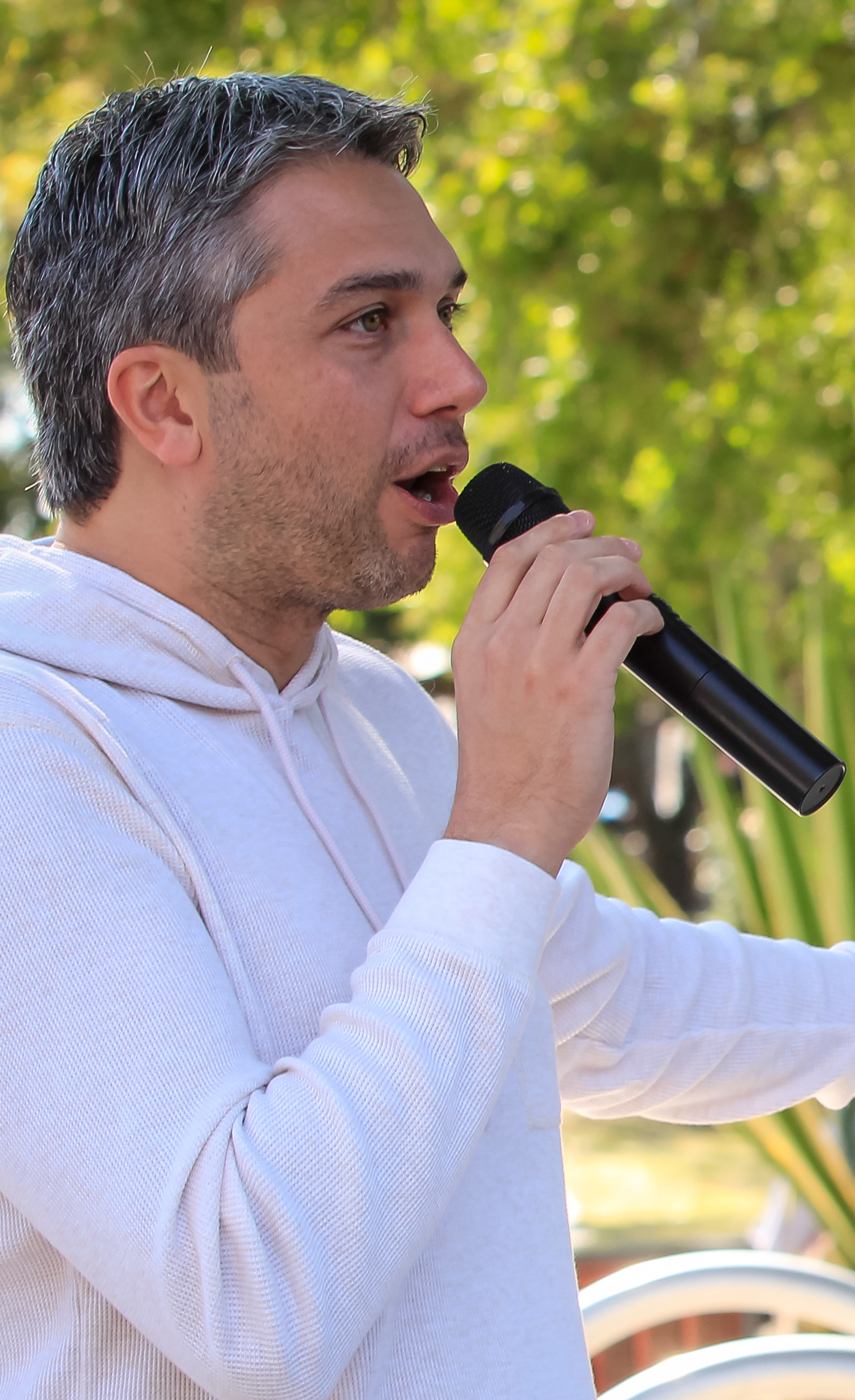
- Trzeciak in 2023

Member of the Chamber of Deputies
- Incumbent
- Assumed office 1 February 2019
- Constituency: Rio Grande do Sul

Personal details
- Born: 4 November 1986 (age 39)
- Party: Brazilian Social Democracy Party (since 2016)

Daniel Trzeciak Duarte (born 4 November 1986) is a Brazilian politician serving as a member of the Chamber of Deputies since 2019. From 2017 to 2019, he was a city councillor of Pelotas.
