= Júnior Ferrari =

Brazilian politician (born 1967)

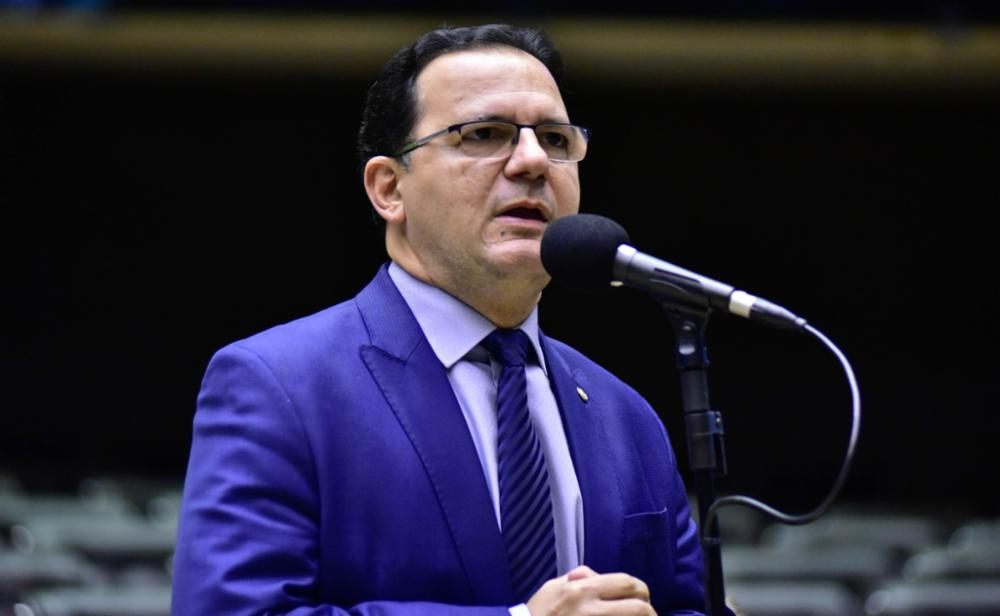
- Ferrari in 2023

Member of the Chamber of Deputies
- Incumbent
- Assumed office 1 February 2019
- Constituency: Pará

Personal details
- Born: 13 July 1967 (age 59)
- Party: Social Democratic Party (since 2011)

João Ferrari Júnior (born 13 July 1967), better known as Júnior Ferrari, is a Brazilian politician serving as a member of the Chamber of Deputies since 2019. From 2012 to 2013, he served as president of the Legislative Assembly of Pará.
