= Lucas Vergílio =

Brazilian politician (born 1987)

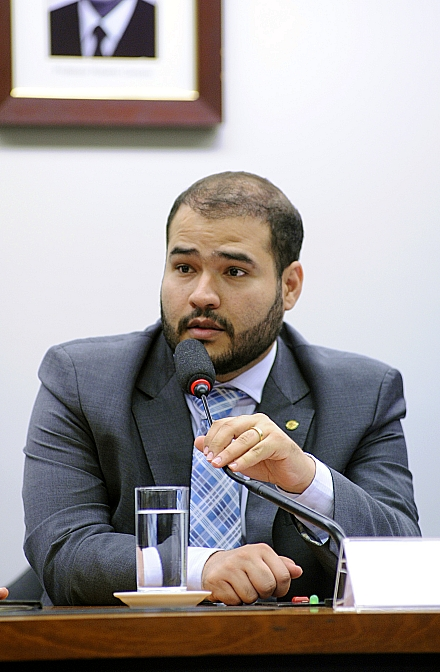
- Vergílio in 2017

Member of the Chamber of Deputies
- In office 1 February 2015 – 31 January 2023
- Constituency: Goiás

Personal details
- Born: 8 April 1987 (age 39)
- Party: Brazilian Democratic Movement
- Parent: Armando Vergílio (father)

Lucas de Castro Santos, better known as Lucas Vergílio (born 8 April 1987), is a Brazilian politician. From 2023 to 2024, he served as secretary of institutional relations of Goiás. From 2015 to 2023, he was a member of the Chamber of Deputies. He is the son of Armando Vergílio.
