= Pedro Lupion =

Brazilian politician (born 1983)

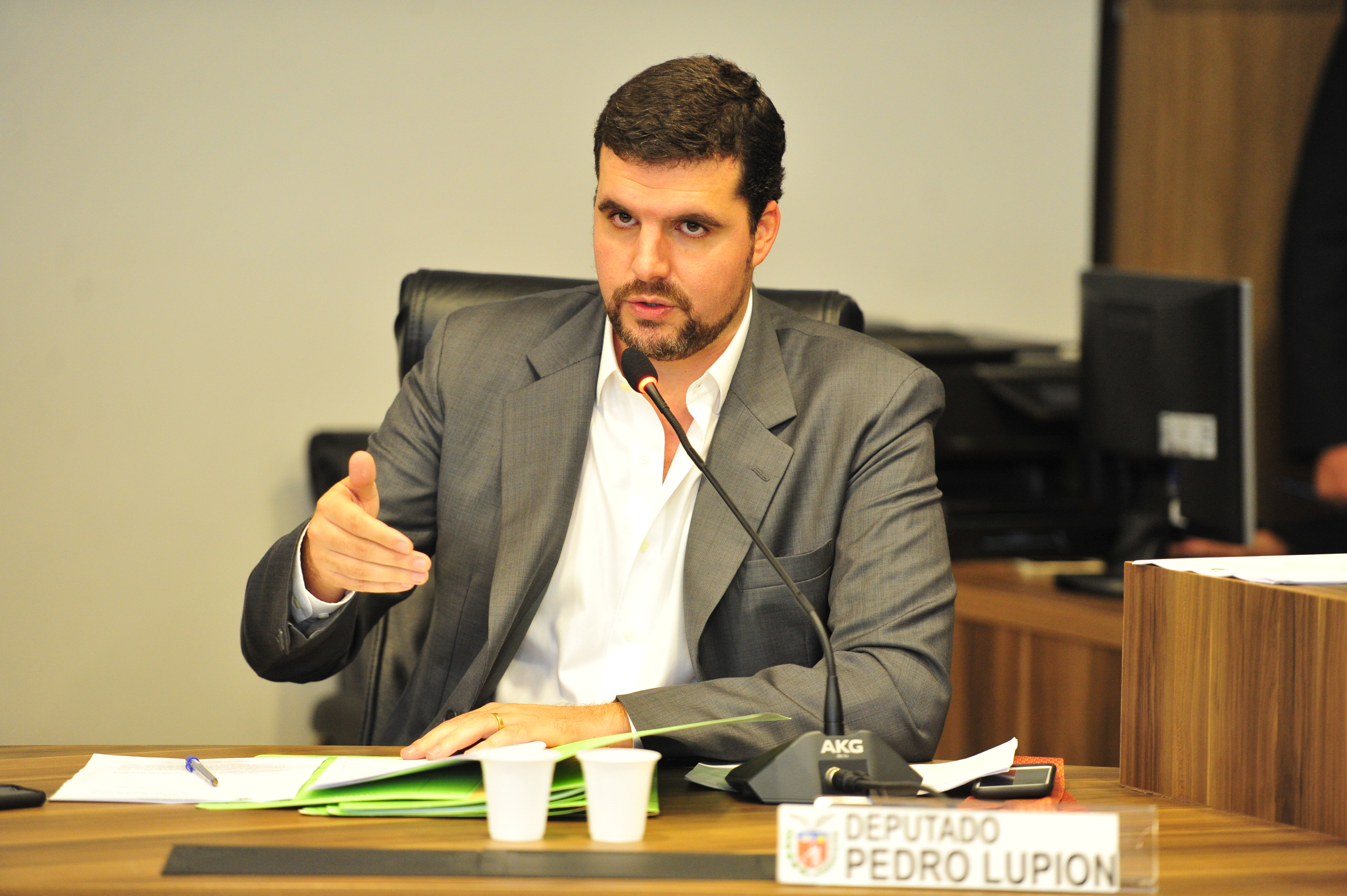
- Lupion in 2017

Member of the Chamber of Deputies
- Incumbent
- Assumed office 1 February 2019
- Constituency: Paraná

Personal details
- Born: 4 June 1983 (age 42)
- Party: Progressistas (since 2022)
- Parent: Abelardo Lupion (father)
- Relatives: Moisés Lupion (great-grandfather)

Pedro Deboni Lupion Mello (born 4 June 1983) is a Brazilian politician serving as a member of the Chamber of Deputies since 2019. From 2011 to 2018, he was a member of the Legislative Assembly of Paraná. He is the son of Abelardo Lupion and the great-grandson of Moisés Lupion.
