= Israel Batista =

Brazilian politician (born 1982)

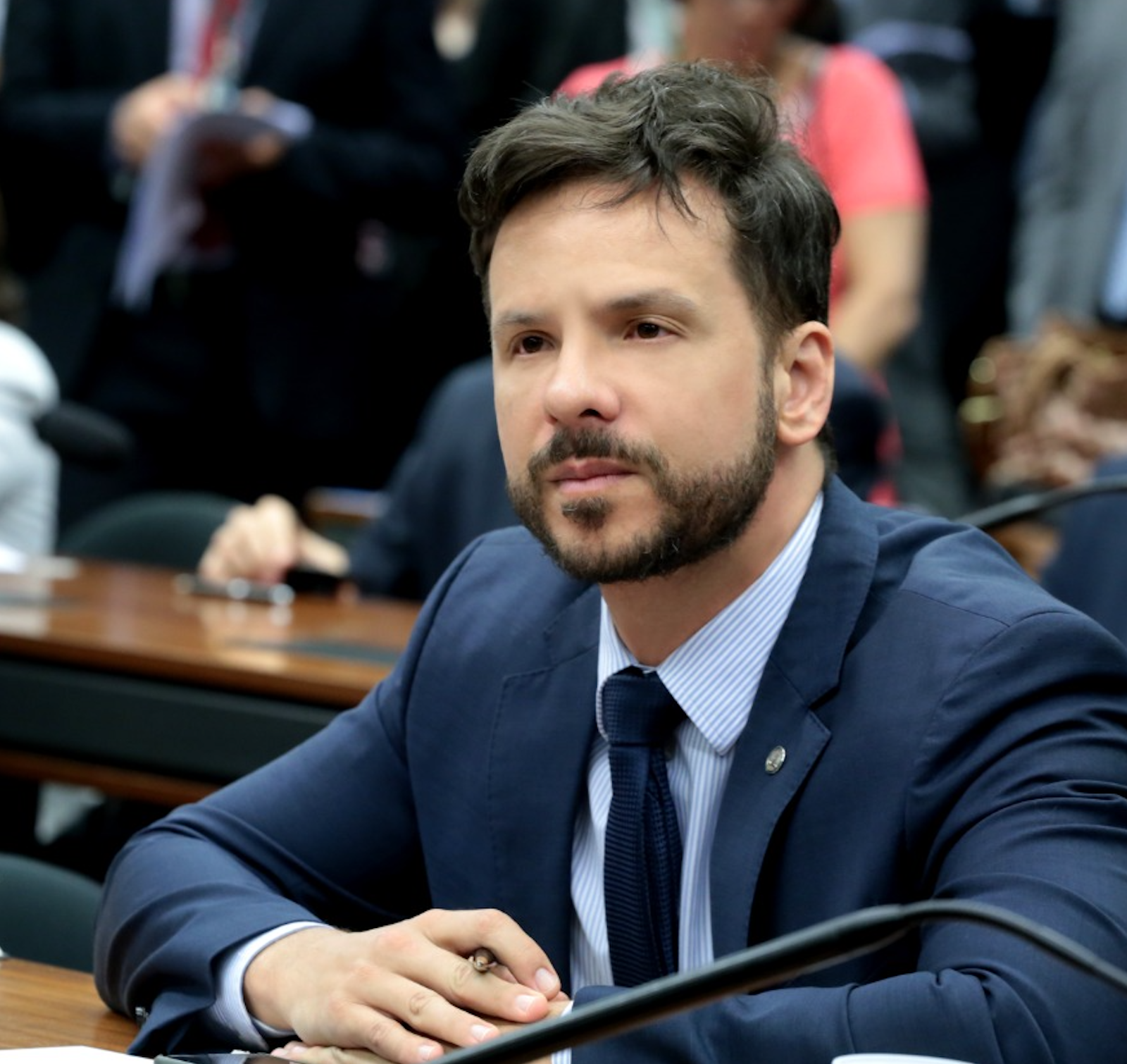
- Batista in 2020

Member of the Chamber of Deputies
- In office 1 February 2019 – 31 January 2023
- Constituency: Federal District

Personal details
- Born: 2 May 1982 (age 43)
- Party: Brazilian Socialist Party (since 2022)

Israel Matos Batista (born 2 May 1982) is a Brazilian politician. From 2019 to 2023, he was a member of the Chamber of Deputies. From 2011 to 2018, he was a member of the Legislative Chamber of the Federal District.
