= Jaziel Pereira =

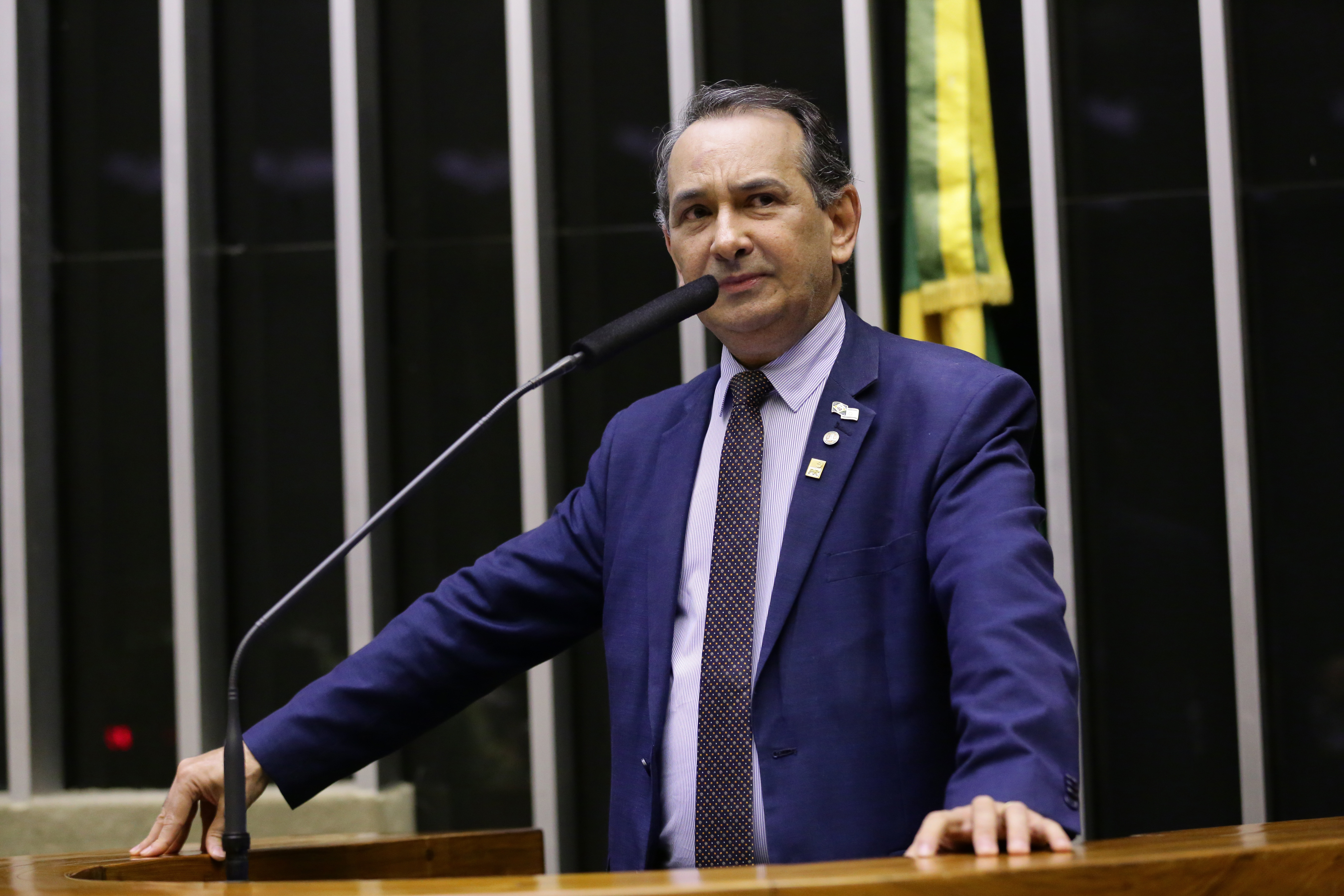

Member of the Chamber of Deputies
- Incumbent
- Assumed office 1 February 2019
- Constituency: Ceará

Personal details
- Born: Jaziel Pereira de Sousa; 3 May 1961 (age 65) Camocim, Ceará, Brazil
- Party: PL (2018–present)
- Other political affiliations: MDB (2004–2018)
- Profession: Physician

Jaziel Pereira de Sousa (born 3 May 1961) is a Brazilian physician and politician affiliated with the Liberal Party (PL).

== Political career ==
He served as a City Councilor in Fortaleza, Ceará, from 2001 to 2002.

In 2018, he was elected federal deputy for Ceará.

In 2022, he was re-elected to the same position as federal deputy, this time representing the Liberal Party (PL).
