= Major Fabiana =

Brazilian politician (born 1980)

Member of the Chamber of Deputies
- In office 1 February 2019 – 31 January 2023
- Constituency: Rio de Janeiro

Personal details
- Born: 9 January 1980 (age 46)
- Party: Liberal Party (since 2022)

Fabiana Silva de Souza (born 9 January 1980), better known as Major Fabiana, is a Brazilian politician. From 2019 to 2023, she was a member of the Chamber of Deputies. In 2019, she served as secretary of victimization and disabilities of Rio de Janeiro.
