= Lucas Gonzalez =

Brazilian politician (born 1988)

Member of the Chamber of Deputies
- In office 1 February 2019 – 31 January 2023
- Constituency: Minas Gerais

Personal details
- Born: 21 December 1988 (age 37)
- Party: New Party (since 2017)

Lucas de Vasconcelos Gonzalez (born 21 December 1988) is a Brazilian politician. From 2019 to 2023, he was a member of the Chamber of Deputies. From 2023 to 2024, he served as deputy secretary general of the government of Minas Gerais.
