= Marcos Aurélio Sampaio =

Brazilian politician (born 1991)

Member of the Chamber of Deputies
- Incumbent
- Assumed office 1 February 2019
- Constituency: Piauí

Personal details
- Born: 19 September 1991 (age 35) Teresina, Piauí, Brazil
- Party: MDB (2011–2022, 2026–present)
- Other political affiliations: PSD (2022–2026)

Marcos Aurélio Sampaio (born 19 September 1991) is a Brazilian politician serving as a member of the Chamber of Deputies since 2019. He is the son of Themístocles Filho.
