= Olival Marques =

Brazilian politician (born 1982)

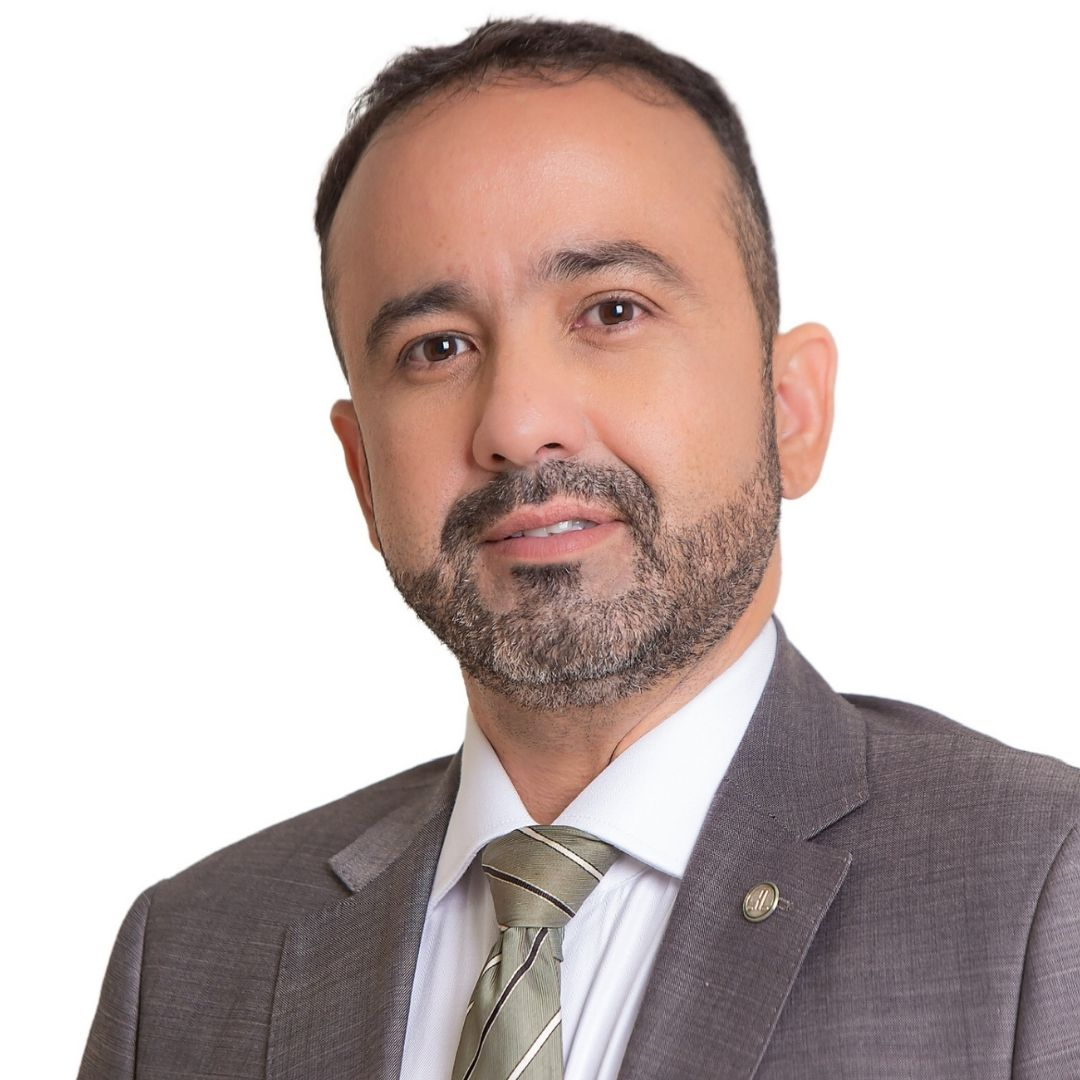
- Marques in 2022

Member of the Chamber of Deputies
- Incumbent
- Assumed office 1 February 2019
- Constituency: Pará

Personal details
- Born: 9 January 1982 (age 44)
- Party: Brazilian Democratic Movement (since 2022)

Olival Henrique Marques de Souza (born 9 January 1982) is a Brazilian politician serving as a member of the Chamber of Deputies since 2019. From 2015 to 2018, he was a member of the Legislative Assembly of Pará.
