= Franco Cartafina =

Brazilian politician (born 1986)

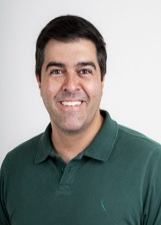
- Cartafina in 2024

Member of the Chamber of Deputies
- In office 1 February 2019 – 31 January 2023
- Constituency: Minas Gerais

Personal details
- Born: 3 November 1986 (age 39)
- Party: Progressistas (since 2019)
- Relatives: Silvério Cartafina Filho

Franco Cartafina Gomes (born 3 November 1986) is a Brazilian politician. From 2019 to 2023, he was a member of the Chamber of Deputies. From 2013 to 2018, he was a municipal councillor of Uberaba. He is the grandson of Silvério Cartafina Filho.
