= Delegado Marcelo Freitas =

Brazilian politician (born 1976)

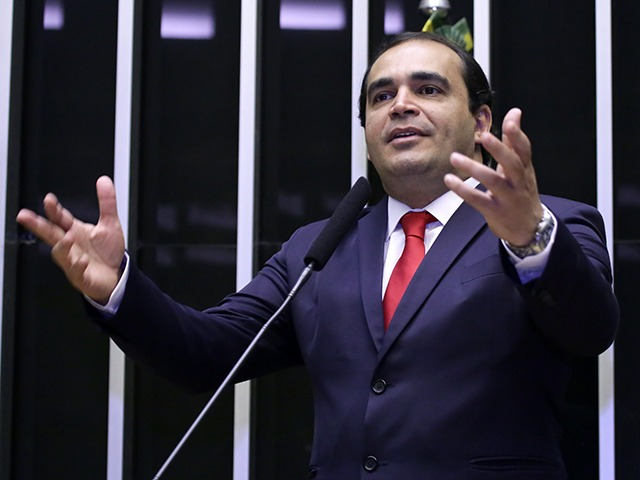
- Freitas in 2021

Member of the Chamber of Deputies
- Incumbent
- Assumed office 1 February 2019
- Constituency: Minas Gerais

Personal details
- Born: 4 March 1976 (age 50)
- Party: Brazil Union (since 2022)

Marcelo Eduardo Freitas (born 4 March 1976), better known as Delegado Marcelo Freitas, is a Brazilian politician serving as a member of the Chamber of Deputies since 2019. He is the president of the Brazil Union in Minas Gerais.
