= Acácio Favacho =

Brazilian politician (born 1983)

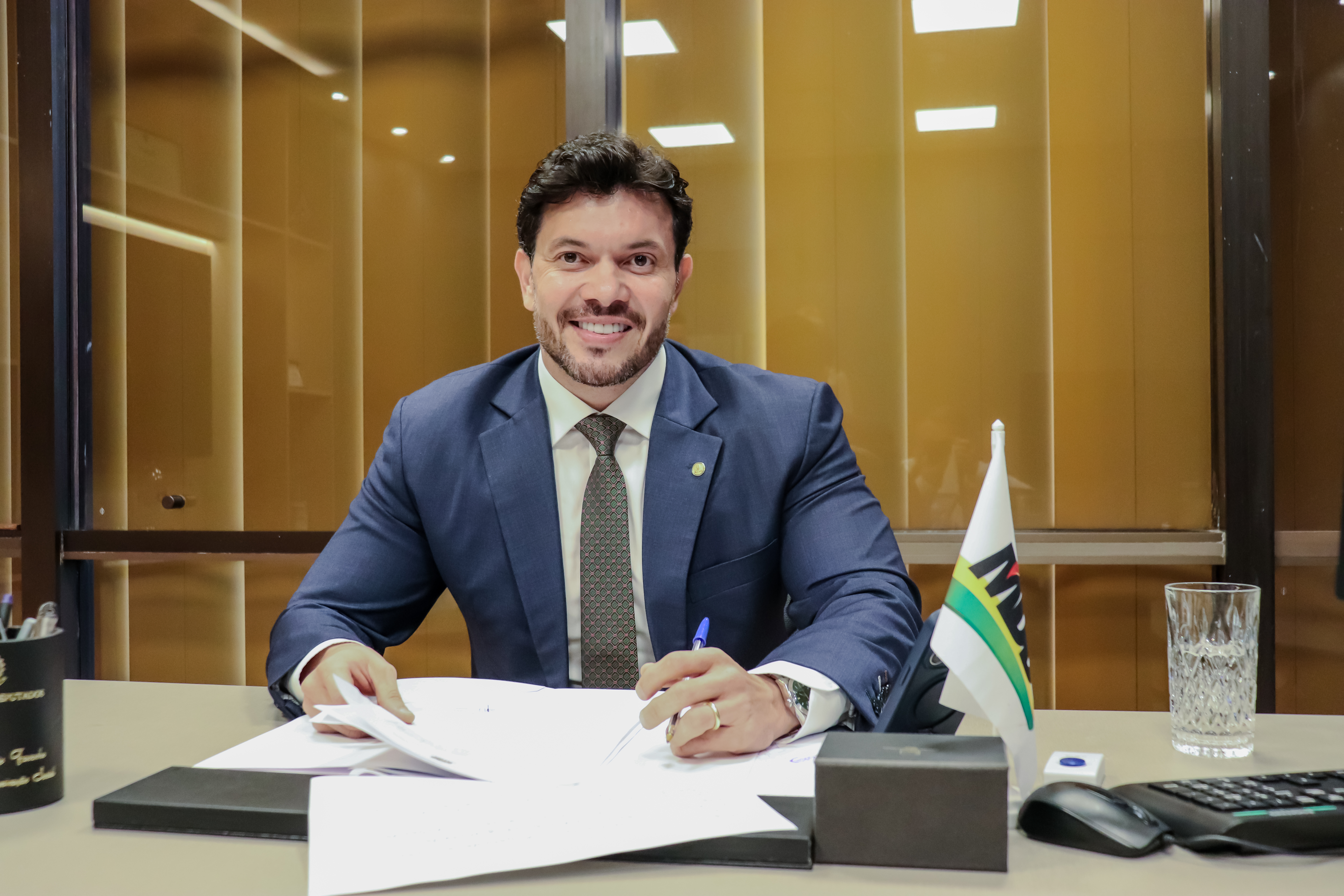
- Favacho in 2025

Member of the Chamber of Deputies
- Incumbent
- Assumed office 1 February 2019
- Constituency: Amapá

Personal details
- Born: 28 September 1983 (age 42)
- Party: Brazilian Democratic Movement (since 2022)
- Relatives: Junior Favacho (brother)

Acácio da Silva Favacho Neto (born 28 September 1983) is a Brazilian politician serving as a member of the Chamber of Deputies since 2019. He is the brother of Júnior Favacho.
