= Fernando Rodolfo =

Brazilian politician (born 1983)

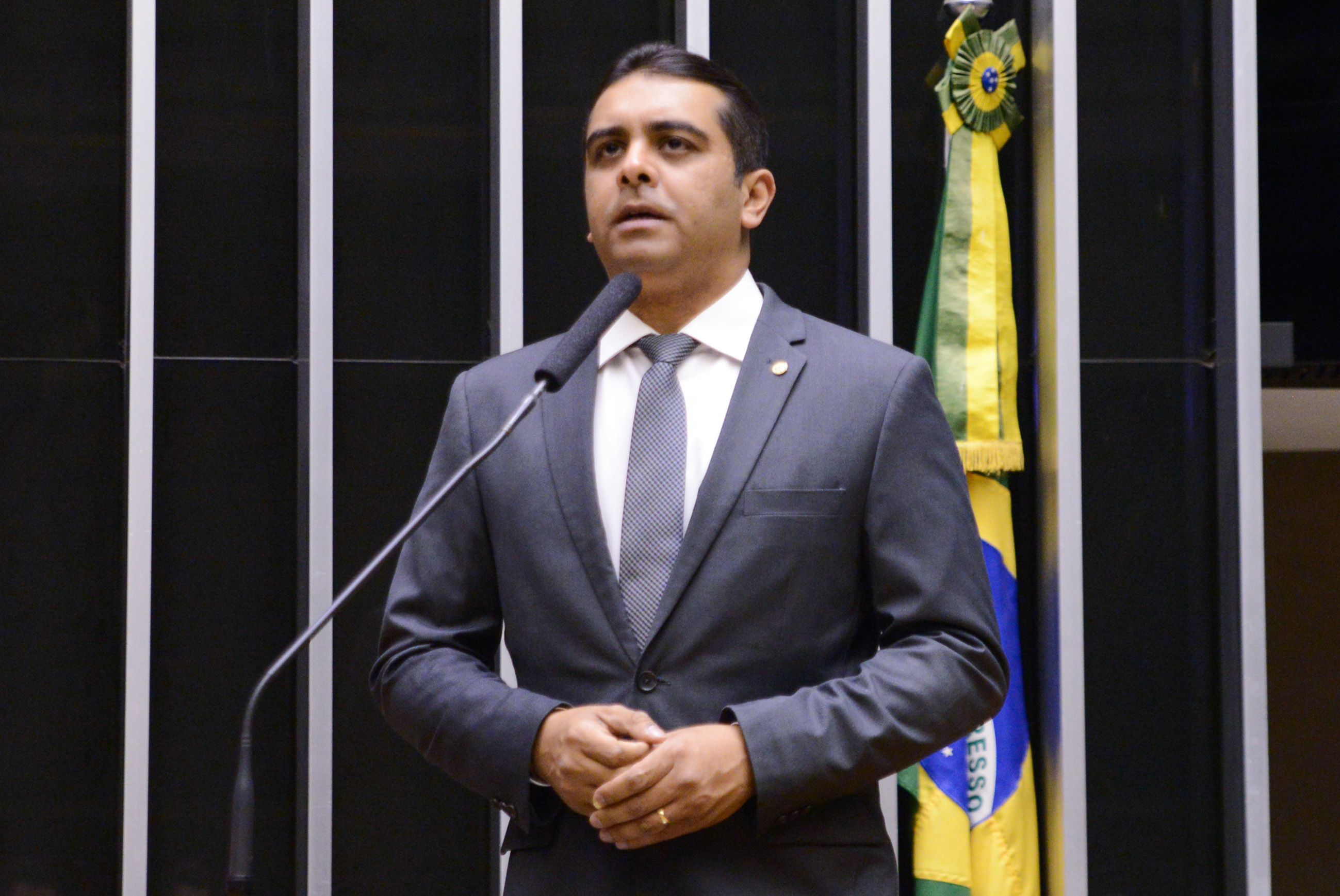
- Rodolfo in 2022

Member of the Chamber of Deputies
- Incumbent
- Assumed office 1 February 2019
- Constituency: Pernambuco

Personal details
- Born: 17 November 1983 (age 43)
- Party: PRD (since 2026)

Fernando Rodolfo Tenório de Vasconcelos (born 17 November 1983) is a Brazilian politician serving as a member of the Chamber of Deputies since 2019. From 2023 to 2024, he served as chairman of the social affairs committee.
