= 55th Legislature of the National Congress =

| ← | 54th | 56th | → |
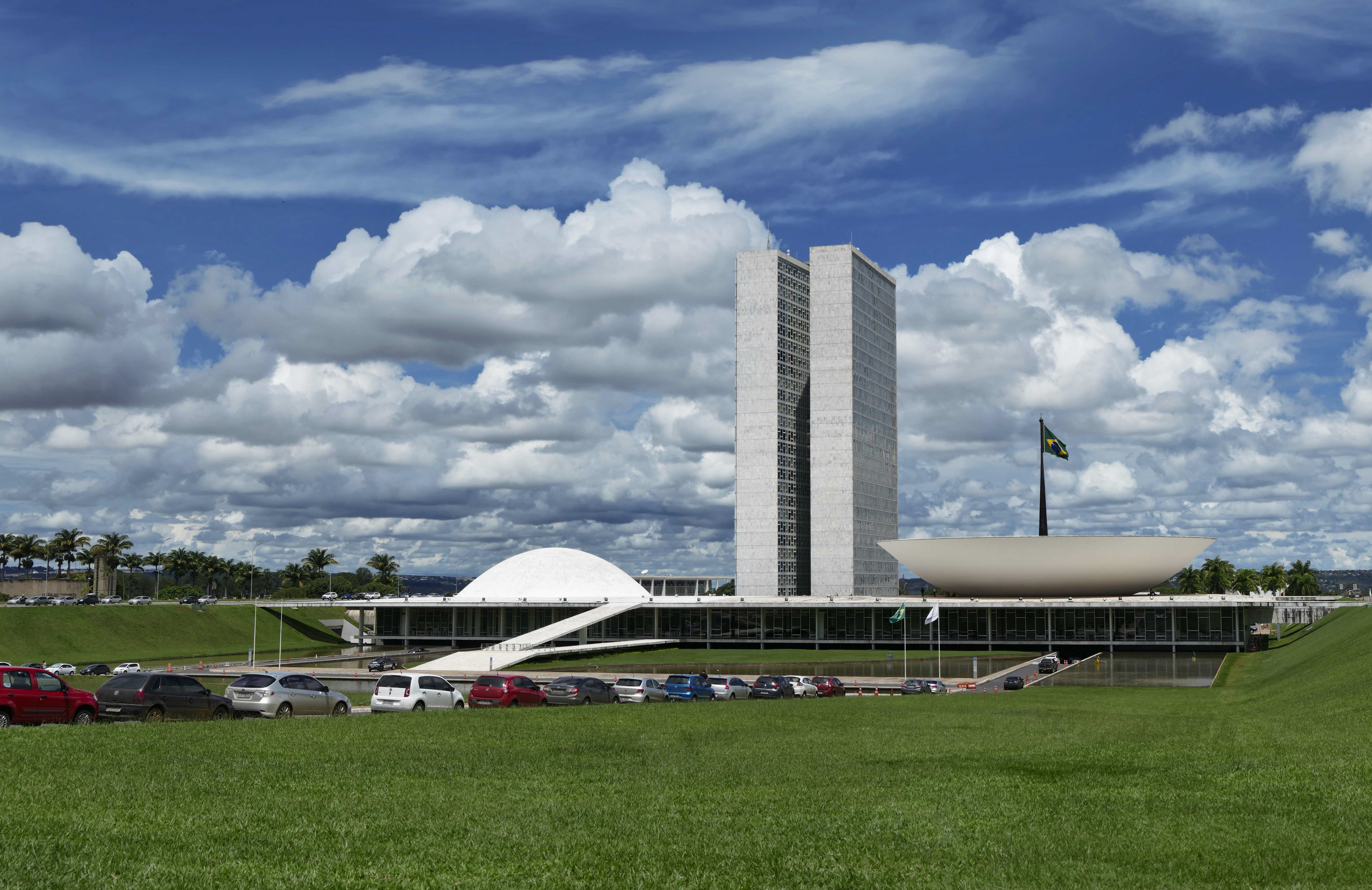
- National Congress building (2016)

Overview
- Legislative body: National Congress
- Meeting place: National Congress Palace
- Term: 1 February 2015 – 1 February 2019
- Election: 5 October 2014
- Government: Rousseff cabinet; (until 12 May 2016); Temer cabinet; (12 May 2016 – 1 January 2019); Bolsonaro cabinet; (from 1 January 2019)
- Website: congressonacional.leg.br

Federal Senate
- Members: 81 senators
- President of the Federal Senate: Renan Calheiros (PMDB-AL) (until 1 February 2017); Eunício Oliveira (MDB-CE) (from 1 February 2017)

Chamber of Deputies
- Members: 513 deputies
- President of the Chamber of Deputies: Eduardo Cunha (PMDB-RJ) (until 7 July 2016); Rodrigo Maia (DEM-RJ) (from 14 July 2016)

Sessions
- 1st: 1 February 2015 – 22 December 2015
- 2nd: 1 February 2016 – 20 December 2016
- 3rd: 1 February 2017 – 20 December 2017
- 4th: 1 February 2018 – 20 December 2018

The 55th Legislature of the National Congress was a meeting of the legislative branch of the Brazilian federal government, consisting of the Chamber of Deputies and the Federal Senate. It met in Brasília from February, 1 2015 to January, 31 2019. All members of the Chamber of Deputies and one-third of the Senate were elected in the elections of 5 October 2014.

== Party summary ==
| Party | Chamber of Deputies | | | | Senate | | | | |
| Party | Votes | % | Seats | +/– | Votes | % | Elected | Total | +/– |
|---|---|---|---|---|---|---|---|---|---|
| Workers' Party | 13,554,166 | 13.93 | 68 | ▼20 | 15,155,818 | 16.96 | 2 | 12 | ▼2 |
| Brazilian Social Democracy Party | 11,073,631 | 11.38 | 54 | ▲1 | 23,880,078 | 26.73 | 4 | 10 | ▼1 |
| Brazilian Democratic Movement Party | 10,791,949 | 11.09 | 66 | ▼13 | 12,129,969 | 13.58 | 5 | 18 | ▼2 |
| Progressive Party | 6,426,791 | 6.61 | 38 | ▼5 | 1,931,738 | 2.16 | 1 | 5 | Steady |
| Brazilian Socialist Party | 6,267,878 | 6.44 | 34 | Steady | 12,123,194 | 13.60 | 3 | 7 | ▲4 |
| Social Democratic Party | 5,967,953 | 6.13 | 36 | New | 7,147,245 | 8.00 | 2 | 3 | New |
| Party of the Republic | 5,635,519 | 5.79 | 34 | ▼7 | 696,462 | 0.78 | 1 | 4 | Steady |
| Brazilian Republican Party | 4,424,824 | 4.55 | 21 | ▲13 | 301,162 | 0.34 | 0 | 1 | Steady |
| Democrats | 4,085,487 | 4.20 | 21 | ▼21 | 3,515,426 | 3.93 | 3 | 5 | ▼1 |
| Brazilian Labour Party | 3,914,193 | 1.02 | 25 | ▲4 | 2,803,999 | 3.14 | 2 | 3 | ▼3 |
| Democratic Labour Party | 3,472,175 | 3.57 | 19 | ▼9 | 3,609,643 | 4.04 | 4 | 8 | ▲4 |
| Solidariedade | 2,689,701 | 2.76 | 15 | New | 370,507 | 0.41 | 0 | 1 | New |
| Social Christian Party | 2,520,421 | 2.59 | 13 | ▼5 | 19,286 | 0.02 | 0 | 0 | ▼1 |
| Green Party | 2,004,464 | 2.06 | 8 | ▼7 | 723,576 | 0.81 | 0 | 1 | ▲1 |
| Republican Party of the Social Order | 1,977,117 | 2.03 | 11 | New | 2,234,132 | 2.50 | 0 | 1 | New |
| Popular Socialist Party | 1,955,689 | 2.01 | 10 | ▼2 | 0 | 0.00 | 0 | 0 | ▼1 |
| Communist Party of Brazil | 1,913,015 | 1.97 | 10 | ▼5 | 803,144 | 0.90 | 0 | 1 | ▼1 |
| Socialism and Liberty Party | 1,745,470 | 1.79 | 5 | ▲2 | 1,045,275 | 1.17 | 0 | 1 | ▼1 |
| Humanist Party of Solidarity | 943,068 | 0.97 | 5 | ▲3 | 0 | 0.00 | 0 | 0 | Steady |
| Labour Party of Brazil | 828,876 | 0.85 | 2 | ▼1 | 11,300 | 0.01 | 0 | 0 | Steady |
| Social Liberal Party | 808,710 | 0.83 | 1 | Steady | 0 | 0.00 | 0 | 0 | Steady |
| Progressive Republican Party | 724,825 | 0.75 | 3 | ▲1 | 170,257 | 0.19 | 0 | 0 | Steady |
| National Labour Party | 723,182 | 0.74 | 4 | ▲4 | 2,741 | 0.00 | 0 | 0 | Steady |
| National Ecologic Party | 667,983 | 0.63 | 2 | New | 65,597 | 0.07 | 0 | 0 | New |
| Christian Social Democratic Party | 509,936 | 0.52 | 2 | ▲2 | 31,011 | 0.03 | 0 | 0 | Steady |
| Party of National Mobilization | 468,473 | 0.48 | 3 | ▼1 | 57,911 | 0.06 | 0 | 0 | ▼1 |
| Brazilian Labour Renewal Party | 454,190 | 0.47 | 1 | ▼1 | 38,429 | 0.04 | 0 | 0 | Steady |
| Christian Labour Party | 338,117 | 0.35 | 2 | ▲1 | 21,993 | 0.02 | 0 | 0 | Steady |
| United Socialist Workers' Party | 118,473 | 0.19 | 0 | Steady | 355,585 | 0.40 | 0 | 0 | Steady |
| Free Fatherland Party | 141,254 | 0.15 | 0 | New | 29,366 | 0.03 | 0 | 0 | New |
| Brazilian Communist Party | 66,979 | 0.07 | 0 | Steady | 68,199 | 0.08 | 0 | 0 | Steady |
| Workers' Cause Party | 12,969 | 0.01 | 0 | Steady | 8,561 | 0.01 | 0 | 0 | Steady |
| Invalid/blank votes | 17,643,419 | – | – | – | 25,554,978 | – | – | – | – |
| Total | 114,906,580 | 100.00 | 513 | – | 114,906,582 | 100.00 | 27 | 81 | – |
| Registered voters/turnout | 142,384,193 | 80.70 | – | – | 142,384,193 | 80.70 | – | – | – |
Source: Election Resources

== Reception ==
According to the political analyst of the Inter-Union Department of Parliamentary Advice, Antônio Augusto de Queiroz, the National Congress elected in 2014 may be considered the most conservative since the "re-democratization" movement, noting an increase in the number of parliamentarians linked to more conservative segments, such as ruralists, military, police and the religious.

== Leadership ==
=== Federal Senate ===
- President of the Federal Senate: Renan Calheiros (PMDB-AL), until 1 February 2017
  - Eunício Oliveira (PMDB-CE), from 1 February 2017

1 February 2015 president election
| Candidate | Votes | Percent |
|---|---|---|
| Renan Calheiros (PMDB–AL) ✓ | 49 | 61.25 |
| Luiz Henrique (PMDB–SC) | 31 | 39.75 |
| Total: | 80 | 100.00 |
| Also: 1-voting null | | Source: |

1 February 2017 president election
| Candidate | Votes | Percent |
|---|---|---|
| Eunício Oliveira (PMDB–CE) ✓ | 61 | 85.71 |
| José Medeiros (PSD–MT) | 10 | 14.29 |
| Total: | 71 | 100.00 |
| Also: 10-voting blank | | Source: |

==== Government Bloc Leadership ====
- Government Leader: Romero Jucá (MDB-RR)
- MDB Leader: Simone Tebet (MS)
- PP Leader: Ana Amélia (RS)
- DEM Leader: Ronaldo Caiado (GO)
- PR Leader: Vicentinho Alves (TO)
- PSD Leader: Omar Aziz (AM)
- PRB Leader: Eduardo Lopes (RJ)
- PTB Leader: Armando Monteiro (PE)
- PPS Leader: Cristovam Buarque (DF)

==== Opposition Bloc Leadership ====
- Opposition Leader: Humberto Costa (PT-PE)
- PT Leader: Lindbergh Farias (RJ)
- PSB Leader: Antonio Carlos Valadares (SE)
- PDT Leader: Acir Gurgacz (RO)
- PCdoB Leader: Vanessa Grazziotin (AM)
- REDE Leader: Randolfe Rodrigues (AP)

==== Independent Bloc Leadership ====
- PSDB Leader: Paulo Bauer (SC)
- PODE Leader: Alvaro Dias (PR)
- PROS Leader: Hélio José (DF)
- PTC Leader: Fernando Collor (AL)

=== Chamber of Deputies ===
- President of the Chamber of Deputies: Eduardo Cunha (PMDB-RJ), until 7 July 2016
  - Rodrigo Maia (DEM-RJ), from 14 July 2016

1 February 2015 president election
| Candidate | Votes | Percent |
|---|---|---|
| Eduardo Cunha (PMDB–RJ) ✓ | 267 | 52.25 |
| Arlindo Chinaglia (PT–SP) | 136 | 26.61 |
| Júlio Delgado (PSB–MG) | 100 | 19.57 |
| Chico Alencar (PSOL–RJ) | 8 | 1.57 |
| Total: | 511 | 100.00 |
| Also: 2-voting blank | | Source: |

14 July 2016 president election
| Candidate | First round | | Second round | |
| Candidate | Votes | Percent | Votes | Percent |
|---|---|---|---|---|
| Rodrigo Maia (DEM–RJ) ✓ | 120 | 24.29 | 285 | 61.96 |
| Rogério Rosso (PSD–DF) | 106 | 21.46 | 170 | 38.04 |
| Marcelo Castro (PMDB–PI) | 70 | 14.17 | | |
| Fernando Giacobo (PR–PR) | 59 | 11.94 | | |
| Esperidião Amin (PP–SC) | 36 | 7.29 | | |
| Luiza Erundina (PSOL–SP) | 22 | 4.45 | | |
| Fábio Ramalho (PMDB–MG) | 18 | 3.64 | | |
| Orlando Silva (PCdoB–SP) | 16 | 3.24 | | |
| Cristiane Brasil (PTB–RJ) | 13 | 2.63 | | |
| Carlos Henrique Gaguim (PTN–TO) | 13 | 2.63 | | |
| Carlos Manato (SD–ES) | 10 | 2.02 | | |
| Miro Teixeira (REDE–RJ) | 6 | 1.21 | | |
| Evair Vieira de Melo (PV–ES) | 5 | 0.64 | | |
| Total: | 494 | 100.00 | 460 | 100.00 |
| Also: 3-not voting; 16-absents | | Also: 5-voting blank; 34-not voting; 16-absents | | Source: |

2 February 2017 president election
| Candidate | Votes | Percent |
|---|---|---|
| Rodrigo Maia (DEM–RJ) ✓ | 293 | 58.72 |
| Jovair Arantes (PTB–GO) | 105 | 21.04 |
| André Figueiredo (PDT–CE) | 59 | 11.82 |
| Júlio Delgado (PSB–MG) | 28 | 5.61 |
| Luiza Erundina (PSOL–SP) | 10 | 2.00 |
| Jair Bolsonaro (PSC–RJ) | 4 | 0.81 |
| Total: | 499 | 100.00 |
| Also: 5-voting blank, 2-not voting; 7-absents | | Source: |

==== Government Bloc Leadership ====
- Government Leader: Aguinaldo Ribeiro (PP-PB)
- Majority Leader: Lelo Coimbra (MDB-ES)
- MDB Leader: Baleia Rossi (SP)
- PP Leader: Arthur Lira (AL)
- DEM Leader: Rodrigo Garcia (SP)
- PR Leader: José Rocha (BA)
- PSD Leader: Domingos Neto (CE)
- PRB Leader: Celso Russomanno (SP)
- PTB Leader: Jovair Arantes (GO)
- SD Leader: Wladimir Costa (PA)
- PSC Leader: Gilberto Nascimento (SP)
- PPS Leader: Alex Manente (SP)
- PATRI Leader: Júnior Marreca (MA)

==== Opposition Bloc Leadership ====
- Opposition Leader: José Guimarães (PT-CE)
- Minority Leader: Weverton Rocha (PDT-MA)
- PT Leader: Paulo Pimenta (RS)
- PSB Leader: Tadeu Alencar (CE)
- PDT Leader: André Figueiredo (CE)
- PCdoB Leader: Orlando Silva (SP)
- PSOL Leader: Chico Alencar (RJ)
- REDE Leader: João Derly (RS)
- PPL Representative: Uldurico Júnior (BA)

==== Independent Bloc Leadership ====
- PSDB Leader: Nilson Leitão (MT)
- PODE Leader: Diego Garcia (PR)
- PROS Leader: Felipe Bornier (RJ)
- PSL Leader: Fernando Francischini (PR)
- AVANTE Leader: Luis Tibé (MG)
- PV Leader: Leandre Dal Ponte (PR)
- PHS Leader: Marcelo Aro (MG)

== Federal Senate ==
The Senate represents the 26 states and the Federal District. Each state and the Federal District has a representation of three Senators, who are elected by popular ballot for a term of eight years. Every four years, renewal of either one third or two-thirds of the Senate (and of the delegations of the States and the Federal District) takes place. In 5 October 2014 elections, one-third (1 senator for each state) of the Federal Senate were elected.

=== Senators by state ===
Acre

| Name | Party | Elect | Term | Votes |
|---|---|---|---|---|
| Gladson Cameli | PP | 2014 | 2015–2023 | 218,756 |
| Jorge Viana | PT | 2010 | 2011–2019 | 205,593 |
| Sérgio Petecão | PSD | 2010 | 2011–2019 | 199,956 |

Alagoas

| Name | Party | Elect | Term | Votes |
|---|---|---|---|---|
| Fernando Collor de Mello | PTC | 2014 | 2015–2023 | 689,266 |
| Benedito de Lira | PP | 2010 | 2011–2019 | 904,345 |
| Renan Calheiros | PMDB | 2010 | 2011–2019 | 840,809 |

Amapá

| Name | Party | Elect | Term | Votes |
|---|---|---|---|---|
| Davi Alcolumbre | DEM | 2014 | 2015–2023 | 131,695 |
| Randolfe Rodrigues | REDE | 2010 | 2011–2019 | 203,259 |
| João Capiberibe | PSB | 2010 | 2011–2019 | 130,038 |

Amazonas

| Name | Party | Elect | Term | Votes |
|---|---|---|---|---|
| Omar Aziz | PSD | 2014 | 2015–2023 | 933,996 |
| Eduardo Braga | PMDB | 2010 | 2011–2019 | 1,236,970 |
| Vanessa Grazziotin | PC do B | 2010 | 2011–2019 | 672,920 |

Bahia

| Name | Party | Elect | Term | Votes |
|---|---|---|---|---|
| Otto Alencar | PSD | 2014 | 2015–2023 | 3,341,111 |
| Roberto Muniz; Replacing Walter Pinheiro | PP | 2010 | 2011–2019 | 3,630,944 |
| Lídice da Mata | PSB | 2010 | 2011–2019 | 3,385,300 |

- Walter Pinheiro replaced by Roberto Muniz since 6 June 2016.

Ceará

| Name | Party | Elect | Term | Votes |
|---|---|---|---|---|
| Tasso Jereissati | PSDB | 2014 | 2015–2023 | 2,314,796 |
| Eunício Oliveira | PMDB | 2010 | 2011–2019 | 2,688,833 |
| José Pimentel | PT | 2010 | 2011–2019 | 2,397,851 |

Distrito Federal

| Name | Party | Elect | Term | Votes |
|---|---|---|---|---|
| José Reguffe | Independent | 2014 | 2015–2023 | 826,576 |
| Cristovam Buarque | PPS | 2010 | 2011–2019 | 833,480 |
| Hélio José; Replacing Rodrigo Rollemberg | PROS | 2010 | 2011–2019 | 738,575 |

- Rodrigo Rollemberg replaced by Hélio José since 1 January 2015.

Espírito Santo

| Name | Party | Elect | Term | Votes |
|---|---|---|---|---|
| Rose de Freitas | PMDB | 2014 | 2015–2023 | 776,978 |
| Sérgio de Castro; Replacing Ricardo Ferraço | PMDB | 2010 | 2011–2019 | 1,557,409 |
| Magno Malta | PR | 2010 | 2011–2019 | 1,285,177 |

- Ricardo Ferraço replaced by Sérgio de Castro since 6 November 2017.

Goiás

| Name | Party | Elect | Term | Votes |
|---|---|---|---|---|
| Ronaldo Caiado | DEM | 2014 | 2015–2023 | 1,283,665 |
| Wilder Morais; Replacing Demóstenes Torres | PP | 2010 | 2011–2019 | 2,158,812 |
| Lúcia Vânia | PSB | 2010 | 2011–2019 | 1,496,559 |

- Demóstenes Torres was expelled on 11 July 2012; Wilder Morais replaced him since 13 July 2012.

Maranhão

| Name | Party | Elect | Term | Votes |
|---|---|---|---|---|
| Roberto Rocha | PSDB | 2014 | 2015–2023 | 1,476,840 |
| Edison Lobão | PMDB | 2010 | 2011–2019 | 1,702,085 |
| João Alberto de Souza | PMDB | 2010 | 2011–2019 | 1,546,298 |

Mato Grosso

| Name | Party | Elect | Term | Votes |
|---|---|---|---|---|
| Wellington Fagundes | PR | 2014 | 2015–2023 | 646,344 |
| Cidinho Santos; Replacing Blairo Maggi | PR | 2010 | 2011–2019 | 1,073,039 |
| José Medeiros; Replacing Pedro Taques | PODE | 2010 | 2011–2019 | 708,440 |

- Pedro Taques replaced by José Medeiros since 1 January 2015.
- Blairo Maggi replaced by Cidinho Santos since 15 May 2016.

Mato Grosso do Sul

| Name | Party | Elect | Term | Votes |
|---|---|---|---|---|
| Simone Tebet | PMDB | 2014 | 2015–2023 | 640,336 |
| Pedro Chaves; Replacing Delcídio do Amaral | PSC | 2010 | 2011–2019 | 826,848 |
| Waldemir Moka | PMDB | 2010 | 2011–2019 | 544,933 |

- Delcídio do Amaral was expelled on 10 May 2016; Pedro Chaves replaced him since 16 May 2016.

Minas Gerais

| Name | Party | Elect | Term | Votes |
|---|---|---|---|---|
| Antônio Anastasia | PSDB | 2014 | 2015–2023 | 5,102,987 |
| Aécio Neves | PSDB | 2010 | 2011–2019 | 7,565,377 |
| Zezé Perrella; Replacing Itamar Franco | PMDB | 2010 | 2011–2019 | 5,125,455 |

- Itamar Franco died on 2 July 2011, Zezé Perrella replaced him since 11 July 2011.

Pará

| Name | Party | Elect | Term | Votes |
|---|---|---|---|---|
| Paulo Rocha | PT | 2014 | 2015–2023 | 1,566,350 |
| Flexa Ribeiro | PSDB | 2010 | 2011–2019 | 1,817,644 |
| Jader Barbalho; Replacing Marinor Brito | PMDB | 2010 | 2011–2019 | 1,799,762 |

- Jader Barbalho won an appeal in the Supreme Federal Court and took office on 28 December 2011, replacing Marinor Brito.

Paraíba

| Name | Party | Elect | Term | Votes |
|---|---|---|---|---|
| José Maranhão | PMDB | 2014 | 2015–2023 | 647,271 |
| Cássio Cunha Lima; Replacing Wilson Santiago | PSDB | 2010 | 2011–2019 | 1,004,183 |
| Raimundo Lira; Replacing Vital do Rêgo Filho | PMDB | 2010 | 2011–2019 | 869,501 |

- Cássio Cunha Lima won an appeal in the Supreme Federal Court and took office on 8 November 2011, replacing Wilson Santiago.
- Vital do Rêgo Filho replaced by Raimundo Lira since 22 December 2014.

Paraná

| Name | Party | Elect | Term | Votes |
|---|---|---|---|---|
| Alvaro Dias | PODE | 2014 | 2015–2023 | 4,101,848 |
| Gleisi Hoffmann | PT | 2010 | 2011–2019 | 3,196,468 |
| Roberto Requião | PMDB | 2010 | 2011–2019 | 2,691,557 |

- Gleisi Hoffmann licensed between 8 June 2011 and 3 February 2014, Sérgio Souza replaced her during this period.

Pernambuco

| Name | Party | Elect | Term | Votes |
|---|---|---|---|---|
| Fernando Bezerra Coelho | PMDB | 2014 | 2015–2023 | 2,655,912 |
| Armando Monteiro | PTB | 2010 | 2011–2019 | 3,142,930 |
| Humberto Costa | PT | 2010 | 2011–2019 | 3,059,818 |

Piauí

| Name | Party | Elect | Term | Votes |
|---|---|---|---|---|
| Elmano Férrer | PMDB | 2014 | 2015–2023 | 981,219 |
| Regina Sousa; Replacing Wellington Dias | PT | 2010 | 2011–2019 | 997,513 |
| Ciro Nogueira | PP | 2010 | 2011–2019 | 695,875 |

- Wellington Dias replaced by Regina Sousa since 1 January 2015.

Rio de Janeiro

| Name | Party | Elect | Term | Votes |
|---|---|---|---|---|
| Romário | PODE | 2014 | 2015–2023 | 4,689,963 |
| Lindberg Farias | PT | 2010 | 2011–2019 | 4,213,749 |
| Eduardo Lopes; Replacing Marcelo Crivella | PRB | 2010 | 2011–2019 | 3,332,886 |

- Marcelo Crivella replaced by Eduardo Lopes since 2 January 2017.

Rio Grande do Norte

| Name | Party | Elect | Term | Votes |
|---|---|---|---|---|
| Fátima Bezerra | PT | 2014 | 2015–2023 | 808,055 |
| Garibaldi Alves Filho | PMDB | 2010 | 2011–2019 | 1,042,272 |
| José Agripino | DEM | 2010 | 2011–2019 | 958,891 |

Rio Grande do Sul

| Name | Party | Elect | Term | Votes |
|---|---|---|---|---|
| Lasier Martins | PSD | 2014 | 2015–2023 | 2,145,179 |
| Paulo Paim | PT | 2010 | 2011–2019 | 3,895,822 |
| Ana Amélia Lemos | PP | 2010 | 2011–2019 | 3,401,241 |

Rondônia

| Name | Party | Elect | Term | Votes |
|---|---|---|---|---|
| Acir Gurgacz | PDT | 2014 | 2015–2023 | 312,614 |
| Valdir Raupp | PMDB | 2010 | 2011–2019 | 481,420 |
| Ivo Cassol | PP | 2010 | 2011–2019 | 454,087 |

Roraima

| Name | Party | Elect | Term | Votes |
|---|---|---|---|---|
| Telmário Mota | PTB | 2014 | 2015–2023 | 96,888 |
| Romero Jucá | PMDB | 2010 | 2011–2019 | 118,481 |
| Ângela Portela | PDT | 2010 | 2011–2019 | 110,993 |

Santa Catarina

| Name | Party | Elect | Term | Votes |
|---|---|---|---|---|
| Dário Berger | PMDB | 2014 | 2015–2023 | 1,308,503 |
| Dalírio Beber; Replacing Luiz Henrique | PSDB | 2010 | 2011–2019 | 1,784,019 |
| Paulo Bauer | PSDB | 2010 | 2011–2019 | 1,588,403 |

- Luiz Henrique died on 10 May 2015; Dalírio Beber replaced him since 19 May 2017.

São Paulo

| Name | Party | Elect | Term | Votes |
|---|---|---|---|---|
| José Serra | PSDB | 2014 | 2015–2023 | 11,105,874 |
| Airton Sandoval; Replacing Aloysio Nunes | PMDB | 2010 | 2011–2019 | 11,189,168 |
| Marta Suplicy | PMDB | 2010 | 2011–2019 | 8,314,027 |

- Aloysio Nunes replaced by Airton Sandoval since 9 March 2017.

Sergipe

| Name | Party | Elect | Term | Votes |
|---|---|---|---|---|
| Maria do Carmo Alves | DEM | 2014 | 2015–2023 | 448,102 |
| Eduardo Amorim | PSDB | 2010 | 2011–2019 | 625,959 |
| Antônio Carlos Valadares | PSB | 2010 | 2011–2019 | 476,549 |

Tocantins

| Name | Party | Elect | Term | Votes |
|---|---|---|---|---|
| Kátia Abreu | PMDB | 2014 | 2015–2023 | 282,052 |
| Ataídes Oliveira; Replacing João Ribeiro | PSDB | 2010 | 2011–2019 | 375,090 |
| Vicentinho Alves | PR | 2010 | 2011–2019 | 340,931 |

- João Ribeiro died on 18 December 2013, Ataídes Oliveira replaced him since 23 December 2013.

== Chamber of Deputies ==
The Chamber comprises 513 deputies, who are elected by proportional representation to serve four-year terms. In 2014 elections, 198 (38.6%) of the elected candidates are new to the Chamber of Deputies, the highest rate of newcomers in 16 years. The number of parliamentary represented parties has also increased: from 22 parties after the 2010 election to 28 at the beginning of the new term.

=== Federal deputies by State ===
Acre (8 federal deputies)

| Name | Party | Coalition | Votes |
|---|---|---|---|
| Angelim | PT | PT / PATRI / PROS / PDT / PTB / PSL / PODE / PSDC / PHS / PSB / PRP / PPL / PRB / PC do B | 39,844 |
| César Messias | PSB | PT / PATRI / PROS / PDT / PTB / PSL / PODE / PSDC / PHS / PSB / PRP / PPL / PRB / PC do B | 26,448 |
| Major Rocha | PSDB | PP / PMDB / PSC / PR / PPS / PTC / PSDB / PSD / AVANTE / SD | 23,466 |
| Léo do PT | PT | PT / PATRI / PROS / PDT / PTB / PSL / PODE / PSDC / PHS / PSB / PRP / PPL / PRB / PC do B | 20,876 |
| Jéssica Sales | PMDB | PP / PMDB / PSC / PR / PPS / PTC / PSDB / PSD / AVANTE / SD | 20,339 |
| Sibá Machado | PT | PT / PATRI / PROS / PDT / PTB / PSL / PODE / PSDC / PHS / PSB / PRP / PPL / PRB / PC do B | 18,395 |
| Flaviano Melo | PMDB | PP / PMDB / PSC / PR / PPS / PTC / PSDB / PSD / AVANTE / SD | 18,372 |
| Alan Rick | PRB | PT / PATRI / PROS / PDT / PTB / PSL / PODE / PSDC / PHS / PSB / PRP / PPL / PRB / PC do B | 17,903 |

Alagoas (9 federal deputies)

| Name | Party | Coalition | Votes |
|---|---|---|---|
| João Henrique Caldas | SD | PP / PPS / PSDC / PRP / PR / PSL / PSB / SD / DEM | 135,929 |
| Marx Beltrão | PMDB | PDT / PSC / PMDB / PV / PTB / PSD / AVANTE / PROS / PC do B / PT / PHS | 123,317 |
| Pedro Vilela | PSDB | PSDB / PRB | 119,582 |
| Arthur Lira | PP | PP / PPS / PSDC / PRP / PR / PSL / PSB / SD / DEM | 98,231 |
| Ronaldo Lessa | PDT | PDT / PSC / PMDB / PV / PTB / PSD / AVANTE / PROS / PC do B / PT / PHS | 88,125 |
| Givaldo Carimbão | PROS | PDT / PSC / PMDB / PV / PTB / PSD / AVANTE / PROS / PC do B / PT / PHS | 82,582 |
| Mauricio Quintella | PR | PP / PPS / PSDC / PRP / PR / PSL / PSB / SD / DEM | 76,706 |
| Cícero Almeida | PRTB | PRTB / PPL / PMN | 64,435 |
| Paulão | PT | PDT / PSC / PMDB / PV / PTB / PSD / AVANTE / PROS / PC do B / PT / PHS | 53,284 |

Amapá (8 federal deputies)

| Name | Party | Coalition | Votes |
|---|---|---|---|
| Roberto Góes | PDT | PP / PDT / PMDB | 22,134 |
| Janete | PSB | PSB / PT / PSOL / PC do B | 21,108 |
| Cabuçu | PMDB | PP / PDT / PMDB | 18,709 |
| Vinícius Gurgel | PR | PR / PRB / PHS / PROS / PSDC / PATRI / PV / AVANTE | 18,661 |
| Professora Marcivânia | PT | PSB / PT / PSOL / PC do B | 16,162 |
| André Abdon | PRB | PR / PRB / PHS / PROS / PSDC / PATRI / PV / AVANTE | 13,798 |
| Marcos Reategui | PSC | PTB / PSC / PPS / PRTB / PMN / PTC / PRP / PPL | 12,485 |
| Jozi Rocha | PTB | PTB / PSC / PPS / PRTB / PMN / PTC / PRP / PPL | 10,007 |

Amazonas (8 federal deputies)

| Name | Party | Coalition | Votes |
|---|---|---|---|
| Artur Bisneto | PSDB | PROS / DEM / PSDB / PR / PODE / PSC / AVANTE / PTC / PRTB / PATRI / PV / PHS / PSL / PSD / SD | 250,916 |
| Silas Câmara | PSD | PROS / DEM / PSDB / PR / PODE / PSC / AVANTE / PTC / PRTB / PATRI / PV / PHS / PSL / PSD / SD | 166,281 |
| Alfredo Nascimento | PR | PROS / DEM / PSDB / PR / PODE / PSC / AVANTE / PTC / PRTB / PATRI / PV / PHS / PSL / PSD / SD | 120,060 |
| Marcos Rotta | PMDB | PMDB / PP / PT / PDT / PTB / PPS / PRB / PSDC / PPL / PC do B | 117,955 |
| Hissa Abrahão | PPS | PMDB / PP / PT / PDT / PTB / PPS / PRB / PSDC / PPL / PC do B | 113,646 |
| Pauderney | DEM | PROS / DEM / PSDB / PR / PODE / PSC / AVANTE / PTC / PRTB / PATRI / PV / PHS / PSL / PSD / SD | 103,904 |
| Átila Lins | PSD | PROS / DEM / PSDB / PR / PODE / PSC / AVANTE / PTC / PRTB / PATRI / PV / PHS / PSL / PSD / SD | 89,453 |
| Conceição Sampaio | PP | PMDB / PP / PT / PDT / PTB / PPS / PRB / PSDC / PPL / PC do B | 71,878 |

Bahia (39 federal deputies)

| Name | Party | Coalition | Votes |
|---|---|---|---|
| Lucio Vieira Lima | PMDB | DEM / PMDB / PSDB / PODE / SD / PROS / PRB / PSC | 222,164 |
| Mário Negromonte Jr. | PP | PP / PDT / PT / PTB / PR / PSD / PC do B | 169,215 |
| Antônio Lázaro | PSC | DEM / PMDB / PSDB / PODE / SD / PROS / PRB / PSC | 161,438 |
| Antonio Brito | PTB | PP / PDT / PT / PTB / PR / PSD / PC do B | 159,840 |
| Ronaldo Carletto | PP | PP / PDT / PT / PTB / PR / PSD / PC do B | 148,628 |
| Daniel Almeida | PC do B | PP / PDT / PT / PTB / PR / PSD / PC do B | 135,382 |
| Félix Jr | PDT | PP / PDT / PT / PTB / PR / PSD / PC do B | 130,583 |
| Caetano | PT | PP / PDT / PT / PTB / PR / PSD / PC do B | 125,862 |
| Cacá Leão | PP | PP / PDT / PT / PTB / PR / PSD / PC do B | 125,605 |
| Jorge Solla | PT | PP / PDT / PT / PTB / PR / PSD / PC do B | 125,159 |
| Valmir Assunção | PT | PP / PDT / PT / PTB / PR / PSD / PC do B | 123,284 |
| Imbassahy | PSDB | DEM / PMDB / PSDB / PODE / SD / PROS / PRB / PSC | 120,479 |
| João Gualberto | PSDB | DEM / PMDB / PSDB / PODE / SD / PROS / PRB / PSC | 117,671 |
| Márcio Marinho | PRB | DEM / PMDB / PSDB / PODE / SD / PROS / PRB / PSC | 117,470 |
| Tia Eron | PRB | DEM / PMDB / PSDB / PODE / SD / PROS / PRB / PSC | 116,912 |
| Waldenor Pereira | PT | PP / PDT / PT / PTB / PR / PSD / PC do B | 114,965 |
| João Bacelar | PR | PP / PDT / PT / PTB / PR / PSD / PC do B | 111,643 |
| Pelegrino | PT | PP / PDT / PT / PTB / PR / PSD / PC do B | 111,252 |
| Roberto Britto | PP | PP / PDT / PT / PTB / PR / PSD / PC do B | 110,82 |
| Paulo Azi | DEM | DEM / PMDB / PSDB / PODE / SD / PROS / PRB / PSC | 110,662 |
| Jutahy Magalhães | PSDB | DEM / PMDB / PSDB / PODE / SD / PROS / PRB / PSC | 108,476 |
| José Nunes | PSD | PP / PDT / PT / PTB / PR / PSD / PC do B | 105,776 |
| Aleluia | DEM | DEM / PMDB / PSDB / PODE / SD / PROS / PRB / PSC | 101,924 |
| José Rocha | PR | PP / PDT / PT / PTB / PR / PSD / PC do B | 101,663 |
| Josias Gomes | PT | PP / PDT / PT / PTB / PR / PSD / PC do B | 98,871 |
| Bebeto | PSB | PSB / PSL / PPL | 96,134 |
| Arthur Maia | SD | DEM / PMDB / PSDB / PODE / SD / PROS / PRB / PSC | 95,698 |
| João Carlos Bacelar Batista | PODE | DEM / PMDB / PSDB / PODE / SD / PROS / PRB / PSC | 95,158 |
| Claudio Cajado | DEM | DEM / PMDB / PSDB / PODE / SD / PROS / PRB / PSC | 89,118 |
| Elmar | DEM | DEM / PMDB / PSDB / PODE / SD / PROS / PRB / PSC | 88,334 |
| Sérgio Brito | PSD | PP / PDT / PT / PTB / PR / PSD / PC do B | 83,658 |
| Afonso Florence | PT | PP / PDT / PT / PTB / PR / PSD / PC do B | 82,66 |
| Moema Gramacho | PT | PP / PDT / PT / PTB / PR / PSD / PC do B | 81,414 |
| Paulo Magalhães | PSD | PP / PDT / PT / PTB / PR / PSD / PC do B | 77,045 |
| Erivelton Santana | PSC | DEM / PMDB / PSDB / PODE / SD / PROS / PRB / PSC | 74,836 |
| Alice Portugal | PC do B | PP / PDT / PT / PTB / PR / PSD / PC do B | 72,682 |
| José Carlos Araújo | PSD | PP / PDT / PT / PTB / PR / PSD / PC do B | 72,013 |
| Benito Gama | PTB | PP / PDT / PT / PTB / PR / PSD / PC do B | 71,372 |
| Uldurico Júnior | PTC | PPS / PSDC / PTC / PV / PRP / AVANTE | 39,904 |

Ceará (22 federal deputies)

| Name | Party | Coalition | Votes |
|---|---|---|---|
| Moroni Torgan | DEM | DEM / PPS / PSDC / PODE | 277,774 |
| Genecias Noronha | SD | PRB / PP / PDT / PT / PTB / PSL / PHS / PSD / PC do B / SD / PROS | 221,567 |
| José Guimarães | PT | PRB / PP / PDT / PT / PTB / PSL / PHS / PSD / PC do B / SD / PROS | 209,032 |
| Domingos Neto | PROS | PRB / PP / PDT / PT / PTB / PSL / PHS / PSD / PC do B / SD / PROS | 185,226 |
| Danilo Forte | PMDB | PMDB / PSC / PR / PRP / PSDB | 180,157 |
| Aníbal Gomes | PMDB | PMDB / PSC / PR / PRP / PSDB | 173,736 |
| Moses Rodrigues | PPS | DEM / PPS / PSDC / PODE | 147,044 |
| Gorete Pereira | PR | PMDB / PSC / PR / PRP / PSDB | 130,983 |
| Luizianne Lins | PT | PRB / PP / PDT / PT / PTB / PSL / PHS / PSD / PC do B / SD / PROS | 130,717 |
| André Figueiredo | PDT | PRB / PP / PDT / PT / PTB / PSL / PHS / PSD / PC do B / SD / PROS | 125,360 |
| Odorico | PT | PRB / PP / PDT / PT / PTB / PSL / PHS / PSD / PC do B / SD / PROS | 121,640 |
| Cabo Sabino | PR | PMDB / PSC / PR / PRP / PSDB | 120,485 |
| Ronaldo Martins | PRB | PRB / PP / PDT / PT / PTB / PSL / PHS / PSD / PC do B / SD / PROS | 117,930 |
| Adail Carneiro | PHS | PRB / PP / PDT / PT / PTB / PSL / PHS / PSD / PC do B / SD / PROS | 113,885 |
| Macedo | PSL | PRB / PP / PDT / PT / PTB / PSL / PHS / PSD / PC do B / SD / PROS | 107,734 |
| Raimundo Matos | PSDB | PMDB / PSC / PR / PRP / PSDB | 95,145 |
| José Airton | PT | PRB / PP / PDT / PT / PTB / PSL / PHS / PSD / PC do B / SD / PROS | 94,056 |
| Vitor Valim | PMDB | PMDB / PSC / PR / PRP / PSDB | 92,499 |
| Leônidas Cristino | PROS | PRB / PP / PDT / PT / PTB / PSL / PHS / PSD / PC do B / SD / PROS | 91,085 |
| Balman | PROS | PRB / PP / PDT / PT / PTB / PSL / PHS / PSD / PC do B / SD / PROS | 87,666 |
| Arnon Bezerra | PTB | PRB / PP / PDT / PT / PTB / PSL / PHS / PSD / PC do B / SD / PROS | 84,474 |
| Chico Lopes | PC do B | PRB / PP / PDT / PT / PTB / PSL / PHS / PSD / PC do B / SD / PROS | 80,578 |

Distrito Federal (8 federal deputies)

| Name | Party | Coalition | Votes |
|---|---|---|---|
| Fraga | DEM | PR / PTB / PRTB / PMN / DEM | 155,056 |
| Rogério Rosso | PSD | PSB / SD / PDT / PSD | 93,653 |
| Érika Kokay | PT | PT / PRB / PC do B / PP / PSC / PROS | 92,558 |
| Ronaldo Fonseca | PROS | PT / PRB / PC do B / PP / PSC / PROS | 84,583 |
| Rôney Nemer | PMDB | PMDB / AVANTE / PRP / PHS / PATRI / PV / PODE / PPL / PSL / PTC | 82,594 |
| Izalci | PSDB | PSDB / PPS / PSDC | 71,937 |
| Augusto Carvalho | SD | PSB / SD / PDT / PSD | 39,461 |
| Laerte Bessa | PR | PR / PTB / PRTB / PMN / DEM | 32,843 |

Espírito Santo (10 federal deputies)

| Name | Party | Coalition | Votes |
|---|---|---|---|
| Sérgio Vidigal | PDT | PDT / PT | 161,744 |
| Lelo Coimbra | PMDB | PMDB / DEM / PSDB / SD / PROS | 94,759 |
| Max Filho | PSDB | PMDB / DEM / PSDB / SD / PROS | 91,210 |
| Foletto | PSB | PRTB / PSB / PSL / PODE | 88,110 |
| Helder Salomão | PT | PDT / PT | 83,967 |
| Dr. Jorge Silva | PROS | PMDB / DEM / PSDB / SD / PROS | 69,880 |
| Manato | SD | PMDB / DEM / PSDB / SD / PROS | 67,631 |
| Givaldo | PT | PDT / PT | 50,928 |
| Evair de Melo | PV | PRB / PP / PTB / PHS / PPS / PSD / PV | 48,829 |
| Marcus Vicente | PP | PRB / PP / PTB / PHS / PPS / PSD / PV | 45,525 |

Goiás (17 federal deputies)

| Name | Party | Coalition | Votes |
|---|---|---|---|
| Delegado Waldir | PSDB | PSDB / PP / PR / PSD / PTB / PDT / PPS / PROS / PRB | 274,625 |
| Daniel Vilela | PMDB | PMDB / DEM / SD / PC do B / PRTB / PODE / PPL | 179,214 |
| Flávia Morais | PDT | PSDB / PP / PR / PSD / PTB / PDT / PPS / PROS / PRB | 159,122 |
| Giuseppe Vecci | PSDB | PSDB / PP / PR / PSD / PTB / PDT / PPS / PROS / PRB | 120,283 |
| Magda Mofatto | PR | PSDB / PP / PR / PSD / PTB / PDT / PPS / PROS / PRB | 118,458 |
| Rubens Otoni | PT | without coalition | 115,874 |
| Célio Silveira | PSDB | PSDB / PP / PR / PSD / PTB / PDT / PPS / PROS / PRB | 110,992 |
| Alexandre Baldy | PSDB | PSDB / PP / PR / PSD / PTB / PDT / PPS / PROS / PRB | 107,544 |
| João Campos | PSDB | PSDB / PP / PR / PSD / PTB / PDT / PPS / PROS / PRB | 107,344 |
| Jovair Arantes | PTB | PSDB / PP / PR / PSD / PTB / PDT / PPS / PROS / PRB | 92,945 |
| Marcos Abrão | PPS | PSDB / PP / PR / PSD / PTB / PDT / PPS / PROS / PRB | 92,347 |
| Heuler Cruvinel | PSD | PSDB / PP / PR / PSD / PTB / PDT / PPS / PROS / PRB | 90,877 |
| Roberto Balestra | PP | PSDB / PP / PR / PSD / PTB / PDT / PPS / PROS / PRB | 85,534 |
| Fábio Sousa | PSDB | PSDB / PP / PR / PSD / PTB / PDT / PPS / PROS / PRB | 82,204 |
| Thiago Peixoto | PSD | PSDB / PP / PR / PSD / PTB / PDT / PPS / PROS / PRB | 79,666 |
| Lucas Vergílio | SD | PMDB / DEM / SD / PC do B / PRTB / PODE / PPL | 78,387 |
| Pedro Chaves | PMDB | PMDB / DEM / SD / PC do B / PRTB / PODE / PPL | 77,925 |

Maranhão (18 federal deputies)

| Name | Party | Coalition | Votes |
|---|---|---|---|
| Eliziane Gama | PPS | SD / PP / PC do B / PPS / PSDB / PSB | 133,575 |
| Hildo Rocha | PMDB | PMDB / DEM / PTB / PV / PRB / PR | 125,521 |
| Rubens Pereira Júnior | PC do B | SD / PP / PC do B / PPS / PSDB / PSB | 118,115 |
| Cléber Verde | PRB | PMDB / DEM / PTB / PV / PRB / PR | 105,243 |
| Sarney Filho | PV | PMDB / DEM / PTB / PV / PRB / PR | 91,669 |
| Zé Carlos | PT | PT / PSD | 90,531 |
| Zé Reinaldo | PSB | SD / PP / PC do B / PPS / PSDB / PSB | 86,728 |
| Pedro Fernandes | PTB | PMDB / DEM / PTB / PV / PRB / PR | 85,507 |
| Victor Mendes | PV | PMDB / DEM / PTB / PV / PRB / PR | 85,034 |
| Juscelino Filho | PRP | PSL / PSDC / PRP / PODE / PRTB | 83,955 |
| João Marcelo | PMDB | PMDB / DEM / PTB / PV / PRB / PR | 83,847 |
| Weverton Rocha | PDT | PDT / PTC / PROS | 81,161 |
| Alberto Filho | PMDB | PMDB / DEM / PTB / PV / PRB / PR | 67,885 |
| Waldir Maranhão | PP | SD / PP / PC do B / PPS / PSDB / PSB | 66,274 |
| André Fufuca | PATRI | PATRI / PMN / PHS / PSC / AVANTE | 56,879 |
| João Castelo | PSDB | SD / PP / PC do B / PPS / PSDB / PSB | 52,783 |
| Júnior Marreca | PATRI | PATRI / PMN / PHS / PSC / AVANTE | 50,962 |
| Aluísio Mendes | PSDC | PSL / PSDC / PRP / PODE / PRTB | 50,658 |

Mato Grosso (8 federal deputies)

| Name | Party | Coalition | Votes |
|---|---|---|---|
| Nilson Leitão | PSDB | PDT / PP / DEM / PSDB / PSB / PPS / PV / PTB / PSDC / PSC / PRP / PSL / PRB | 127,749 |
| Adilton Sachetti | PSB | PDT / PP / DEM / PSDB / PSB / PPS / PV / PTB / PSDC / PSC / PRP / PSL / PRB | 112,722 |
| Fábio Garcia | PSB | PDT / PP / DEM / PSDB / PSB / PPS / PV / PTB / PSDC / PSC / PRP / PSL / PRB | 104,976 |
| Ságuas Moraes | PT | PT / PMDB / PROS / PR | 97,858 |
| Carlos Bezerra | PMDB | PT / PMDB / PROS / PR | 95,739 |
| Ezequiel Fonseca | PP | PDT / PP / DEM / PSDB / PSB / PPS / PV / PTB / PSDC / PSC / PRP / PSL / PRB | 90,888 |
| Professor Victório Galle | PSC | PDT / PP / DEM / PSDB / PSB / PPS / PV / PTB / PSDC / PSC / PRP / PSL / PRB | 64,691 |
| Valtenir Pereira | PROS | PT / PMDB / PROS / PR | 62,923 |

Mato Grosso do Sul (8 federal deputies)

| Name | Party | Coalition | Votes |
|---|---|---|---|
| Zeca do PT | PT | PT / PR / PDT / PROS / PTC / PC do B / PTB / PSDC | 160,556 |
| Marun | PMDB | PMDB / PSB / PRB / PODE / PATRI / PSC | 91,816 |
| Geraldo Resende | PMDB | PMDB / PSB / PRB / PODE / PATRI / PSC | 87,546 |
| Tereza Cristina | PSB | PMDB / PSB / PRB / PODE / PATRI / PSC | 75,149 |
| Vander Loubet | PT | PT / PR / PDT / PROS / PTC / PC do B / PTB / PSDC | 69,504 |
| Mandetta | DEM | PSDB / DEM / PSD / SD / PPS / PMN | 57,374 |
| Marcio Monteiro | PSDB | PSDB / DEM / PSD / SD / PPS / PMN | 56,441 |
| Dagoberto Nogueira | PDT | PT / PR / PDT / PROS / PTC / PC do B / PTB / PSDC | 54,813 |

Minas Gerais (53 federal deputies)

| Name | Party | Coalition | Votes |
|---|---|---|---|
| Reginaldo Lopes | PT | PT / PMDB / PC do B / PROS / PRB | 310,226 |
| Rodrigo de Castro | PSDB | DEM / PSDB / PP / PR / PSD / SD | 292,848 |
| Misael Varella | DEM | DEM / PSDB / PP / PR / PSD / SD | 258,363 |
| Odair Cunha | PT | PT / PMDB / PC do B / PROS / PRB | 201,782 |
| Gabriel Guimarães | PT | PT / PMDB / PC do B / PROS / PRB | 200,014 |
| Weliton Prado | PT | PT / PMDB / PC do B / PROS / PRB | 186,098 |
| Odelmo Leão | PP | DEM / PSDB / PP / PR / PSD / SD | 179,652 |
| Eros Biondini | PTB | PTB / PMN | 179,073 |
| Jaiminho Martins | PSD | DEM / PSDB / PP / PR / PSD / SD | 158,907 |
| Toninho Pinheiro | PP | DEM / PSDB / PP / PR / PSD / SD | 148,239 |
| Patrus Ananias | PT | PT / PMDB / PC do B / PROS / PRB | 147,175 |
| George Hilton | PRB | PT / PMDB / PC do B / PROS / PRB | 146,792 |
| Stéfano Aguiar | PSB | PSB / PPL / PRTB | 144,153 |
| Domingos Sávio | PSDB | DEM / PSDB / PP / PR / PSD / SD | 143,901 |
| Marcus Pestana | PSDB | DEM / PSDB / PP / PR / PSD / SD | 131,687 |
| Eduardo Barbosa | PSDB | DEM / PSDB / PP / PR / PSD / SD | 130,453 |
| Mauro Lopes | PMDB | PT / PMDB / PC do B / PROS / PRB | 129,795 |
| Dimas Fabiano | PP | DEM / PSDB / PP / PR / PSD / SD | 129,096 |
| Newton Cardoso Jr. | PMDB | PT / PMDB / PC do B / PROS / PRB | 128,489 |
| Bilac Pinto | PR | DEM / PSDB / PP / PR / PSD / SD | 123,377 |
| Leonardo Quintão | PMDB | PT / PMDB / PC do B / PROS / PRB | 118,470 |
| Luiz Fernando | PP | DEM / PSDB / PP / PR / PSD / SD | 117,542 |
| Marcos Montes | PSD | DEM / PSDB / PP / PR / PSD / SD | 116,175 |
| Leonardo Monteiro | PT | PT / PMDB / PC do B / PROS / PRB | 115,336 |
| Luis Tibé | AVANTE | AVANTE / PRP / PHS / PATRI | 114,948 |
| Diego Andrade | PSD | DEM / PSDB / PP / PR / PSD / SD | 114,240 |
| Padre João | PT | PT / PMDB / PC do B / PROS / PRB | 112,722 |
| Saraiva Felipe | PMDB | PT / PMDB / PC do B / PROS / PRB | 111,317 |
| Zé Silva | SD | DEM / PSDB / PP / PR / PSD / SD | 109,925 |
| Renzo Braz | PP | DEM / PSDB / PP / PR / PSD / SD | 109,510 |
| Carlos Melles | DEM | DEM / PSDB / PP / PR / PSD / SD | 107,906 |
| Paulo Abi-Ackel | PSDB | DEM / PSDB / PP / PR / PSD / SD | 104,849 |
| Caio Narcio | PSDB | DEM / PSDB / PP / PR / PSD / SD | 101,040 |
| Lincoln Portela | PR | DEM / PSDB / PP / PR / PSD / SD | 98,834 |
| Raquel Muniz | PSC | PSC / PTC / PSL | 96,073 |
| Sub-Tenente Gonzaga | PDT | PPS / PV / PDT | 93,997 |
| Miguel Correa | PT | PT / PMDB / PC do B / PROS / PRB | 93,450 |
| Rodrigo Pacheco | PMDB | PT / PMDB / PC do B / PROS / PRB | 92,743 |
| Aelton Freitas | PR | DEM / PSDB / PP / PR / PSD / SD | 91,103 |
| Mario Heirnger | PDT | PPS / PV / PDT | 90,738 |
| Marcelo Aro | PHS | AVANTE / PRP / PHS / PATRI | 87,113 |
| Júlio Delgado | PSB | PSB / PPL / PRTB | 86,245 |
| Bonifacio Andrada | PSDB | DEM / PSDB / PP / PR / PSD / SD | 83,628 |
| Fabinho Ramalho | PV | PPS / PV / PDT | 83,567 |
| Margarida Salomão | PT | PT / PMDB / PC do B / PROS / PRB | 78,973 |
| Laudívio Carvalho | PMDB | PT / PMDB / PC do B / PROS / PRB | 78,762 |
| Jô Moraes | PC do B | PT / PMDB / PC do B / PROS / PRB | 67,650 |
| Tenente Lúcio | PSB | PSB / PPL / PRTB | 67,459 |
| Marcelo Álvaro Antônio | PRP | AVANTE / PRP / PHS / PATRI | 60,384 |
| Adelmo Leão | PT | PT / PMDB / PC do B / PROS / PRB | 57,921 |
| Dâmina Pereira | PMN | PTB / PMN | 52,679 |
| Edson Moreira | PODE | PODE / PSDC | 49,391 |
| Brunny | PTC | PSC / PTC / PSL | 45,381 |

Pará (17 federal deputies)

| Name | Party | Coalition | Votes |
|---|---|---|---|
| Éder Mauro | PSD | PSDB / PSD / PSB / PP / PSC / PTB / PPS / AVANTE / PTC | 265,983 |
| Nilson Pinto | PSDB | PSDB / PSD / PSB / PP / PSC / PTB / PPS / AVANTE / PTC | 193,573 |
| Edmilson Rodrigues | PSOL | PSOL / PSTU | 170,604 |
| Lúcio Vale | PR | PR / DEM / PHS / PROS / PC do B / PSL / PDT / PPL | 148,163 |
| Beto Faro | PT | PMDB / PT | 142,970 |
| Wlad | SD | PRB / SD | 141,213 |
| Josué Bengtson | PTB | PSDB / PSD / PSB / PP / PSC / PTB / PPS / AVANTE / PTC | 122,995 |
| Priante | PMDB | PMDB / PT | 122,348 |
| Zé Geraldo | PT | PMDB / PT | 105,151 |
| Beto Salame | PROS | PR / DEM / PHS / PROS / PC do B / PSL / PDT / PPL | 93,524 |
| Elcione | PMDB | PMDB / PT | 87,632 |
| Júlia Marinho | PSC | PSDB / PSD / PSB / PP / PSC / PTB / PPS / AVANTE / PTC | 86,949 |
| Hélio Leite | DEM | PR / DEM / PHS / PROS / PC do B / PSL / PDT / PPL | 85,194 |
| Simone Morgado | PMDB | PMDB / PT | 76,510 |
| Joaquim Passarinho | PSD | PSDB / PSD / PSB / PP / PSC / PTB / PPS / AVANTE / PTC | 76,148 |
| Jordy | PPS | PSDB / PSD / PSB / PP / PSC / PTB / PPS / AVANTE / PTC | 70,950 |
| Chapadinha | PSD | PSDB / PSD / PSB / PP / PSC / PTB / PPS / AVANTE / PTC | 63,671 |

Paraíba (12 federal deputies)

| Name | Party | Coalition | Votes |
|---|---|---|---|
| Pedro Cunha Lima | PSDB | PSDB / PATRI / PR / PTB / PSD / SD / PMN / PPS / AVANTE / PODE / PRB / PSDC / PSC / PP | 179,886 |
| Veneziano | PMDB | PMDB / PT | 177,680 |
| Aguinaldo Ribeiro | PP | PSDB / PATRI / PR / PTB / PSD / SD / PMN / PPS / AVANTE / PODE / PRB / PSDC / PSC / PP | 161,999 |
| Hugo | PMDB | PMDB / PT | 123,686 |
| Manoel Júnior | PMDB | PMDB / PT | 105,693 |
| Wellington Roberto | PR | PSDB / PATRI / PR / PTB / PSD / SD / PMN / PPS / AVANTE / PODE / PRB / PSDC / PSC / PP | 104,799 |
| Efraim Filho | DEM | PSB / DEM / PRTB / PDT / PRP / PV / PT / PSL / PC do B / PHS / PPL | 103,477 |
| Wilson Filho | PTB | PSDB / PATRI / PR / PTB / PSD / SD / PMN / PPS / AVANTE / PODE / PRB / PSDC / PSC / PP | 95,746 |
| Rômulo Gouveia | PSD | PSDB / PATRI / PR / PTB / PSD / SD / PMN / PPS / AVANTE / PODE / PRB / PSDC / PSC / PP | 84,820 |
| Luiz Couto | PT | PSB / DEM / PRTB / PDT / PRP / PV / PT / PSL / PC do B / PHS / PPL | 69,922 |
| Dr. Damião | PDT | PSB / DEM / PRTB / PDT / PRP / PV / PT / PSL / PC do B / PHS / PPL | 67,558 |
| Benjamin Maranhão | SD | PSDB / PATRI / PR / PTB / PSD / SD / PMN / PPS / AVANTE / PODE / PRB / PSDC / PSC / PP | 63,433 |

Paraná (30 federal deputies)

| Name | Party | Coalition | Votes |
|---|---|---|---|
| Christiane Yared | PODE | PT / PDT / PRB / PODE / PC do B | 200,144 |
| Alex Canziani | PTB | PSDC / PATRI / PTB / PHS / PMN / PROS | 187,475 |
| Valdir Rossoni | PSDB | PSDB / DEM / PR / PSC / AVANTE / PP / SD / PSD / PPS | 177,324 |
| João Arruda | PMDB | without coalition | 176,370 |
| Hidekazu Takayama | PSC | PSDB / DEM / PR / PSC / AVANTE / PP / SD / PSD / PPS | 162,952 |
| Fernando Francischini | SD | PSDB / DEM / PR / PSC / AVANTE / PP / SD / PSD / PPS | 159,569 |
| Luciano Ducci | PSB | without coalition | 156,263 |
| Zeca Dirceu | PT | PT / PDT / PRB / PODE / PC do B | 155,583 |
| Dilceu Sperafico | PP | PSDB / DEM / PR / PSC / AVANTE / PP / SD / PSD / PPS | 151,930 |
| Hermes Parcianello | PMDB | without coalition | 150,213 |
| Fernando Giacobo | PR | PSDB / DEM / PR / PSC / AVANTE / PP / SD / PSD / PPS | 144,305 |
| Marcelo Belinati | PP | PSDB / DEM / PR / PSC / AVANTE / PP / SD / PSD / PPS | 137,817 |
| Osmar Serraglio | PMDB | without coalition | 117,048 |
| Sandro Alex | PPS | PSDB / DEM / PR / PSC / AVANTE / PP / SD / PSD / PPS | 116,909 |
| Ricardo Barros | PP | PSDB / DEM / PR / PSC / AVANTE / PP / SD / PSD / PPS | 114,396 |
| Enio Verri | PT | PT / PDT / PRB / PODE / PC do B | 107,508 |
| Luiz Nishimori | PR | PSDB / DEM / PR / PSC / AVANTE / PP / SD / PSD / PPS | 106,852 |
| Nelson Meurer | PP | PSDB / DEM / PR / PSC / AVANTE / PP / SD / PSD / PPS | 106,478 |
| Rubens Bueno | PPS | PSDB / DEM / PR / PSC / AVANTE / PP / SD / PSD / PPS | 95,841 |
| Evandro Roman | PSD | PSDB / DEM / PR / PSC / AVANTE / PP / SD / PSD / PPS | 92,042 |
| Luiz Carlos Hauly | PSDB | PSDB / DEM / PR / PSC / AVANTE / PP / SD / PSD / PPS | 86,439 |
| Edmar Arruda | PSC | PSDB / DEM / PR / PSC / AVANTE / PP / SD / PSD / PPS | 85,155 |
| Aliel Machado | PC do B | PT / PDT / PRB / PODE / PC do B | 82,886 |
| Alfredo Kaefer | PSDB | PSDB / DEM / PR / PSC / AVANTE / PP / SD / PSD / PPS | 82,554 |
| Leandre Dal Ponte | PV | PV / PPL | 81,181 |
| Sérgio Souza | PMDB | without coalition | 77,699 |
| Assis do Couto | PT | PT / PDT / PRB / PODE / PC do B | 76,116 |
| Toninho Wandscheer | PT | PT / PDT / PRB / PODE / PC do B | 71,822 |
| Diego Garcia | PHS | PSDC / PATRI / PTB / PHS / PMN / PROS | 61,063 |
| Leopoldo Meyer | PSB | without coalition | 59,974 |

Pernambuco (25 federal deputies)

| Name | Party | Coalition | Votes |
|---|---|---|---|
| Eduardo da Fonte | PP | PSB / PMDB / PC do B / PV / PR / PSD / PPS / PSDB / SD / PPL / DEM / PROS / PP / PATRI / PTC | 283,567 |
| Pastor Eurico | PSB | PSB / PMDB / PC do B / PV / PR / PSD / PPS / PSDB / SD / PPL / DEM / PROS / PP / PATRI / PTC | 233,762 |
| Jarbas Vasconcelos | PMDB | PSB / PMDB / PC do B / PV / PR / PSD / PPS / PSDB / SD / PPL / DEM / PROS / PP / PATRI / PTC | 227,470 |
| Felipe Carreras | PSB | PSB / PMDB / PC do B / PV / PR / PSD / PPS / PSDB / SD / PPL / DEM / PROS / PP / PATRI / PTC | 187,348 |
| Anderson Ferreira | PR | PSB / PMDB / PC do B / PV / PR / PSD / PPS / PSDB / SD / PPL / DEM / PROS / PP / PATRI / PTC | 150,565 |
| Daniel Coelho | PSDB | PSB / PMDB / PC do B / PV / PR / PSD / PPS / PSDB / SD / PPL / DEM / PROS / PP / PATRI / PTC | 138,825 |
| Bruno Araújo | PSDB | PSB / PMDB / PC do B / PV / PR / PSD / PPS / PSDB / SD / PPL / DEM / PROS / PP / PATRI / PTC | 131,768 |
| João Fernando Coutinho | PSB | PSB / PMDB / PC do B / PV / PR / PSD / PPS / PSDB / SD / PPL / DEM / PROS / PP / PATRI / PTC | 120,059 |
| Sebastião Oliveira | PR | PSB / PMDB / PC do B / PV / PR / PSD / PPS / PSDB / SD / PPL / DEM / PROS / PP / PATRI / PTC | 115,926 |
| Danilo Cabral | PSB | PSB / PMDB / PC do B / PV / PR / PSD / PPS / PSDB / SD / PPL / DEM / PROS / PP / PATRI / PTC | 113,588 |
| Fernando Filho | PSB | PSB / PMDB / PC do B / PV / PR / PSD / PPS / PSDB / SD / PPL / DEM / PROS / PP / PATRI / PTC | 112,684 |
| Sílvio Costa | PSC | PTB / PT / PSC / PDT / PRB / AVANTE | 103,461 |
| Tadeu Alencar | PSB | PSB / PMDB / PC do B / PV / PR / PSD / PPS / PSDB / SD / PPL / DEM / PROS / PP / PATRI / PTC | 102,669 |
| Gonzaga Patriota | PSB | PSB / PMDB / PC do B / PV / PR / PSD / PPS / PSDB / SD / PPL / DEM / PROS / PP / PATRI / PTC | 101,452 |
| André de Paula | PSD | PSB / PMDB / PC do B / PV / PR / PSD / PPS / PSDB / SD / PPL / DEM / PROS / PP / PATRI / PTC | 100,875 |
| Adalberto Cavalcanti | PTB | PTB / PT / PSC / PDT / PRB / AVANTE | 99,912 |
| Marinaldo Rosendo | PSB | PSB / PMDB / PC do B / PV / PR / PSD / PPS / PSDB / SD / PPL / DEM / PROS / PP / PATRI / PTC | 97,380 |
| Betinho Gomes | PSDB | PSB / PMDB / PC do B / PV / PR / PSD / PPS / PSDB / SD / PPL / DEM / PROS / PP / PATRI / PTC | 97,269 |
| Zaca Cavalcanti | PTB | PTB / PT / PSC / PDT / PRB / AVANTE | 97,057 |
| Ricardo Teobaldo | PTB | PTB / PT / PSC / PDT / PRB / AVANTE | 92,262 |
| Mendonça Filho | DEM | PSB / PMDB / PC do B / PV / PR / PSD / PPS / PSDB / SD / PPL / DEM / PROS / PP / PATRI / PTC | 88,250 |
| Wolney Queiroz | PDT | PTB / PT / PSC / PDT / PRB / AVANTE | 86,739 |
| Jorge Côrte Real | PTB | PTB / PT / PSC / PDT / PRB / AVANTE | 86,023 |
| Luciana Santos | PC do B | PSB / PMDB / PC do B / PV / PR / PSD / PPS / PSDB / SD / PPL / DEM / PROS / PP / PATRI / PTC | 85,053 |
| Kaio Maniçoba | PHS | PSDC / PODE / PRP / PSL / PHS / PRTB | 28,585 |

Piauí (10 federal deputies)

| Name | Party | Coalition | Votes |
|---|---|---|---|
| Rejane Dias | PT | PT / PP / PTB / PHS / PR / PROS / PRP / SD | 134,157 |
| Átila Lira | PSB | PMDB / PODE / PTC / PDT / PSB / PSD / PRB / DEM / PSDC / AVANTE / PC do B / PPS / PSDB | 129,276 |
| Iracema Portella | PP | PT / PP / PTB / PHS / PR / PROS / PRP / SD | 121,121 |
| Marcelo Castro | PMDB | PMDB / PODE / PTC / PDT / PSB / PSD / PRB / DEM / PSDC / AVANTE / PC do B / PPS / PSDB | 111,132 |
| Júlio César | PSD | PMDB / PODE / PTC / PDT / PSB / PSD / PRB / DEM / PSDC / AVANTE / PC do B / PPS / PSDB | 99,750 |
| Assis Carvalho | PT | PT / PP / PTB / PHS / PR / PROS / PRP / SD | 94,093 |
| Rodrigo Martins | PSB | PMDB / PODE / PTC / PDT / PSB / PSD / PRB / DEM / PSDC / AVANTE / PC do B / PPS / PSDB | 92,349 |
| Heráclito Fortes | PSB | PMDB / PODE / PTC / PDT / PSB / PSD / PRB / DEM / PSDC / AVANTE / PC do B / PPS / PSDB | 90,898 |
| Paes Landim | PTB | PT / PP / PTB / PHS / PR / PROS / PRP / SD | 82,549 |
| Fabio Abreu | PTB | PT / PP / PTB / PHS / PR / PROS / PRP / SD | 80,839 |

Rio de Janeiro (46 federal deputies)

| Name | Party | Coalition | Votes |
|---|---|---|---|
| Jair Bolsonaro | PP | PMDB / PP / PSC / PSD / PTB | 464,572 |
| Clarissa Garotinho | PR | PR / PROS | 335,061 |
| Eduardo Cunha | PMDB | PMDB / PP / PSC / PSD / PTB | 232,708 |
| Chico Alencar | PSOL | PSOL | 195,964 |
| Leonardo Picciani | PMDB | PMDB / PP / PSC / PSD / PTB | 180,741 |
| Pedro Paulo | PMDB | PMDB / PP / PSC / PSD / PTB | 162,403 |
| Jean Wyllys | PSOL | PSOL | 144,770 |
| Roberto Sales | PRB | PRB | 124,087 |
| Marco Antônio Cabral | PMDB | PMDB / PP / PSC / PSD / PTB | 119,584 |
| Otávio Leite | PSDB | PSDB / PPS / DEM | 106,398 |
| Felipe Bornier | PSD | PMDB / PP / PSC / PSD / PTB | 105,517 |
| Sóstenes Cavalcante | PSD | PMDB / PP / PSC / PSD / PTB | 104,697 |
| Washington Reis | PMDB | PMDB / PP / PSC / PSD / PTB | 103,190 |
| Rosângela Gomes | PRB | PRB | 101,686 |
| Júlio Lopes | PP | PMDB / PP / PSC / PSD / PTB | 96,796 |
| Índio da Costa | PSD | PMDB / PP / PSC / PSD / PTB | 91,523 |
| Alessandro Molon | PT | PT / PSB / PC do B | 87,003 |
| Hugo Leal | PROS | PR / PROS | 85,449 |
| Glauber Braga | PSB | PT / PSB / PC do B | 82,236 |
| Cristiane Brasil | PTB | PMDB / PP / PSC / PSD / PTB | 81,817 |
| Jandira Feghali | PC do B | PT / PSB / PC do B | 68,531 |
| Dr. João | PR | PR / PROS | 65,624 |
| Simão Sessim | PP | PMDB / PP / PSC / PSD / PTB | 58,825 |
| Celso Pansera | PMDB | PMDB / PP / PSC / PSD / PTB | 58,534 |
| Miro Teixeira | PROS | PR / PROS | 58,409 |
| Áureo | SD | SD / PSL | 58,117 |
| Sérgio Zveiter | PSD | PMDB / PP / PSC / PSD / PTB | 57,587 |
| Arolde de Oliveira | PSD | PMDB / PP / PSC / PSD / PTB | 55,380 |
| Rodrigo Maia | DEM | PSDB / PPS / DEM | 53,167 |
| Chico d'Ângelo | PT | PT / PSB / PC do B | 52,809 |
| Cabo Daciolo | PSOL | PSOL | 49,831 |
| Luiz Sérgio | PT | PT / PSB / PC do B | 48,903 |
| Alexandre Serfiotis | PSD | PMDB / PP / PSC / PSD / PTB | 48,879 |
| Deley | PTB | PMDB / PP / PSC / PSD / PTB | 48,874 |
| Soraya Santos | PMDB | PMDB / PP / PSC / PSD / PTB | 48,204 |
| Benedita da Silva | PT | PT / PSB / PC do B | 48,163 |
| Paulo Feijó | PR | PR / PROS | 48,058 |
| Marcelo Matos | PDT | PDT | 47,370 |
| Fernando Jordão | PMDB | PMDB / PP / PSC / PSD / PTB | 47,188 |
| Francisco Floriano | PR | PR / PROS | 47,157 |
| Marcos Soares | PR | PR / PROS | 44,440 |
| Altineu Cortes | PR | PR / PROS | 40,593 |
| Fabiano Horta | PT | PT / PSB / PC do B | 37,989 |
| Ezequiel Teixeira | SD | SD / PSL | 35,701 |
| Luiz Carlos Ramos | PSDC | PSDC / PMN / PTC | 33,221 |
| Alexandre Valle | PRP | PRP / PRTB / PPL | 26,526 |

Rio Grande do Norte (8 federal deputies)

| Name | Party | Coalition | Votes |
|---|---|---|---|
| Walter Alves | PMDB | PMDB / PR / PSB / PROS / PDT / SD / PSC / DEM / PV / PMN / PRP / PSDB / PSDC / PRB | 191,064 |
| Rafael Motta | PROS | PMDB / PR / PSB / PROS / PDT / SD / PSC / DEM / PV / PMN / PRP / PSDB / PSDC / PRB | 176,239 |
| Fábio Faria | PSD | PSD / PT / PC do B / AVANTE / PP / PATRI | 166,427 |
| Dra. Zenaide Maia | PR | PMDB / PR / PSB / PROS / PDT / SD / PSC / DEM / PV / PMN / PRP / PSDB / PSDC / PRB | 134,588 |
| Felipe Maia | DEM | PMDB / PR / PSB / PROS / PDT / SD / PSC / DEM / PV / PMN / PRP / PSDB / PSDC / PRB | 113,722 |
| Rogério Marinho | PSDB | PMDB / PR / PSB / PROS / PDT / SD / PSC / DEM / PV / PMN / PRP / PSDB / PSDC / PRB | 81,534 |
| Antônio Jácome | PMN | PMDB / PR / PSB / PROS / PDT / SD / PSC / DEM / PV / PMN / PRP / PSDB / PSDC / PRB | 71,555 |
| Beto Rosado | PP | PSD / PT / PC do B / AVANTE / PP / PATRI | 64,445 |

Rio Grande do Sul (31 federal deputies)

| Name | Party | Coalition | Votes |
|---|---|---|---|
| Luis Carlos Heinze | PP | PP / PRB / SD / PSDB | 162,462 |
| Danrlei de Deus | PSD | PSB / PPS / PSD / AVANTE / PHS / PSL / PSDC | 158,973 |
| Alceu Moreira | PMDB | without coalition | 152,421 |
| Giovani Feltes | PMDB | without coalition | 151,406 |
| Onyx Lorenzoni | DEM | PDT / PSC / PV / PATRI / DEM | 148,302 |
| Paulo Pimenta | PT | without coalition | 140,868 |
| Marco Maia | PT | without coalition | 133,639 |
| Afonso Hamm | PP | PP / PRB / SD / PSDB | 132,202 |
| Luiz Carlos Busato | PTB | PTB / PC do B / PR / PPL / PROS / PTC | 130,807 |
| Henrique Fontana | PT | without coalition | 128,981 |
| Maria do Rosário | PT | without coalition | 127,919 |
| Osmar Terra | PMDB | without coalition | 120,755 |
| Nelson Marchezan Júnior | PSDB | PP / PRB / SD / PSDB | 119,375 |
| Márcio Biolchi | PMDB | without coalition | 119,190 |
| Dionilso Mateus Marcon | PT | without coalition | 116,178 |
| Giovani Cherini | PDT | PDT / PSC / PV / PATRI / DEM | 115,294 |
| Jerônimo Goergen | PP | PP / PRB / SD / PSDB | 115,173 |
| Sérgio Moraes | PTB | PTB / PC do B / PR / PPL / PROS / PTC | 115,155 |
| Covatti Filho | PP | PP / PRB / SD / PSDB | 115,131 |
| Darcisio Paulo Perondi | PMDB | without coalition | 109,864 |
| Pepe Vargas | PT | without coalition | 109,469 |
| João Derly | PC do B | PTB / PC do B / PR / PPL / PROS / PTC | 106,991 |
| Renato Delmar Molling | PP | PP / PRB / SD / PSDB | 102,770 |
| Heitor Schuch | PSB | PSB / PPS / PSD / AVANTE / PHS / PSL / PSDC | 101,243 |
| Bohn Gass | PT | without coalition | 100,841 |
| Fernando Marroni | PT | without coalition | 94,275 |
| Carlos Gomes | PRB | PP / PRB / SD / PSDB | 92,323 |
| Darci Pompeo de Mattos | PDT | PDT / PSC / PV / PATRI / DEM | 91,849 |
| Afonso Antunes da Motta | PDT | PDT / PSC / PV / PATRI / DEM | 90,917 |
| Ronaldo Nogueira | PTB | PTB / PC do B / PR / PPL / PROS / PTC | 77,017 |
| José Luiz Stedile | PSB | PSB / PPS / PSD / AVANTE / PHS / PSL / PSDC | 60,523 |

Rondônia (8 federal deputies)

| Name | Party | Coalition | Votes |
|---|---|---|---|
| Marinha Raupp | PMDB | PMDB / PRTB / PC do B / PDT / PRP / PSB / PTB / PSL / PODE | 61,419 |
| Marcos Rogério | PDT | PMDB / PRTB / PC do B / PDT / PRP / PSB / PTB / PSL / PODE | 60,780 |
| Mariana Carvalho | PSDB | PSDB / PSDC / PSD / PATRI / SD / PHS / PSC / PMN / AVANTE / PRB / DEM | 60,324 |
| Nilton Capixaba | PTB | PMDB / PRTB / PC do B / PDT / PRP / PSB / PTB / PSL / PODE | 42,353 |
| Lúcio Mosquini | PMDB | PMDB / PRTB / PC do B / PDT / PRP / PSB / PTB / PSL / PODE | 40,595 |
| Luiz Cláudio | PR | PP / PR / PPS / PTC / PV / PROS | 33,737 |
| Expedito Netto | SD | PSDB / PSDC / PSD / PATRI / SD / PHS / PSC / PMN / AVANTE / PRB / DEM | 25,691 |
| Lindomar Garçon | PMDB | PMDB / PRTB / PC do B / PDT / PRP / PSB / PTB / PSL / PODE | 24,146 |

Roraima (8 federal deputies)

| Name | Party | Coalition | Votes |
|---|---|---|---|
| Shéridan | PSDB | PSDB / PR / PRB / PSD / SD / PROS / PRP / PMDB / PSB / PODE | 35,555 |
| Johnathan de Jesus | PRB | PSDB / PR / PRB / PSD / SD / PROS / PRP / PMDB / PSB / PODE | 20,677 |
| Remídio da Amatur | PR | PSDB / PR / PRB / PSD / SD / PROS / PRP / PMDB / PSB / PODE | 15,492 |
| Édio Lopes | PMDB | PSDB / PR / PRB / PSD / SD / PROS / PRP / PMDB / PSB / PODE | 15,290 |
| Dr. Hiran Gonçalves | PMN | PRTB / PHS / PPL / PMN / PATRI / PSDC / AVANTE / PSC / PSL / PPS | 9,048 |
| Abel Galinha | PDT | PT / PDT / PV / PTC / PC do B | 8,834 |
| Maria Helena | PSB | PSDB / PR / PRB / PSD / SD / PROS / PRP / PMDB / PSB / PODE | 7,481 |
| Carlos Andrade | PHS | PRTB / PHS / PPL / PMN / PATRI / PSDC / AVANTE / PSC / PSL / PPS | 6,733 |

Santa Catarina (16 federal deputies)

| Name | Party | Coalition | Votes |
|---|---|---|---|
| Esperidião Amin | PP | PP / PPS / PRTB / PHS / PSDB / PATRI / SD / PTC / PSB | 229,668 |
| João Rodrigues | PSD | PSD / PC do B / PV / PMDB / PR / PTB / PSC / PSDC / PROS / PRB / PDT / DEM | 221,409 |
| Mauro Mariani | PMDB | PSD / PC do B / PV / PMDB / PR / PTB / PSC / PSDC / PROS / PRB / PDT / DEM | 195,942 |
| Jorginho Mello | PR | PSD / PC do B / PV / PMDB / PR / PTB / PSC / PSDC / PROS / PRB / PDT / DEM | 140,839 |
| Peninha | PMDB | PSD / PC do B / PV / PMDB / PR / PTB / PSC / PSDC / PROS / PRB / PDT / DEM | 137,784 |
| Pedro Uczai | PT | without coalition | 135,439 |
| Marco Tebaldi | PSDB | PP / PPS / PRTB / PHS / PSDB / PATRI / SD / PTC / PSB | 135,042 |
| João Paulo Kleinübing | PSD | PSD / PC do B / PV / PMDB / PR / PTB / PSC / PSDC / PROS / PRB / PDT / DEM | 132,349 |
| Jorge Boeira | PP | PP / PPS / PRTB / PHS / PSDB / PATRI / SD / PTC / PSB | 123,770 |
| Valdir Colatto | PMDB | PSD / PC do B / PV / PMDB / PR / PTB / PSC / PSDC / PROS / PRB / PDT / DEM | 115,431 |
| Décio Lima | PT | without coalition | 112,366 |
| Cesar Souza | PSD | PSD / PC do B / PV / PMDB / PR / PTB / PSC / PSDC / PROS / PRB / PDT / DEM | 110,777 |
| Celso Maldaner | PMDB | PSD / PC do B / PV / PMDB / PR / PTB / PSC / PSDC / PROS / PRB / PDT / DEM | 110,436 |
| Ronaldo Benedet | PMDB | PSD / PC do B / PV / PMDB / PR / PTB / PSC / PSDC / PROS / PRB / PDT / DEM | 105,303 |
| Carmen Zanotto | PPS | PP / PPS / PRTB / PHS / PSDB / PATRI / SD / PTC / PSB | 78,607 |
| Geovânia de Sá | PSDB | PP / PPS / PRTB / PHS / PSDB / PATRI / SD / PTC / PSB | 52,757 |

São Paulo (70 federal deputies)

| Name | Party | Coalition | Votes |
|---|---|---|---|
| Celso Russomanno | PRB | without coalition | 1,524,361 |
| Tiririca | PR | without coalition | 1,016,796 |
| Marco Feliciano | PSC | without coalition | 398,087 |
| Bruno Covas | PSDB | PSDB / DEM / PPS | 352,708 |
| Rodrigo Garcia | DEM | PSDB / DEM / PPS | 336,151 |
| Carlos Sampaio | PSDB | PSDB / DEM / PPS | 295,623 |
| Duarte Nogueira | PSDB | PSDB / DEM / PPS | 254,051 |
| Ricardo Tripoli | PSDB | PSDB / DEM / PPS | 233,806 |
| Samuel Moreira | PSDB | PSDB / DEM / PPS | 227,210 |
| Paulinho da Força | SD | without coalition | 227,186 |
| Baleia Rossi | PMDB | PMDB / PROS / PP / PSD | 208,352 |
| Eduardo Cury | PSDB | PSDB / DEM / PPS | 185,638 |
| Márcio Alvino | PR | without coalition | 179,950 |
| Major Olímpio Gomes | PDT | without coalition | 179,196 |
| Jorge Tadeu | DEM | PSDB / DEM / PPS | 178,771 |
| Bruna Furlan | PSDB | PSDB / DEM / PPS | 178,606 |
| Luiza Erundina | PSB | without coalition | 177,279 |
| Vitor Lippi | PSDB | PSDB / DEM / PPS | 176,153 |
| Silvio Torres | PSDB | PSDB / DEM / PPS | 175,310 |
| Andrés Sanchez | PT | PT / PC do B | 169,834 |
| Ivan Valente | PSOL | PSOL / PSTU | 168,928 |
| Miguel Haddad | PSDB | PSDB / DEM / PPS | 168,278 |
| Alex Manente | PPS | PSDB / DEM / PPS | 164,760 |
| Jefferson Campos | PSD | PMDB / PROS / PP / PSD | 161,790 |
| Guilherme Mussi | PP | PMDB / PROS / PP / PSD | 156,297 |
| Arnaldo Jardim | PSDB | PSDB / DEM / PPS | 155,278 |
| Mara Gabrilli | PSDB | PSDB / DEM / PPS | 155,143 |
| Missionário José Olímpio | PP | PMDB / PROS / PP / PSD | 154,597 |
| Vanderlei Macris | PSDB | PSDB / DEM / PPS | 148,449 |
| Zarattini | PT | PT / PC do B | 138,286 |
| Antonio Bulhões | PRB | without coalition | 137,939 |
| Arlindo Chinaglia | PT | PT / PC do B | 135,772 |
| Eli Corrêa Filho | DEM | PSDB / DEM / PPS | 134,138 |
| Roberto Alves | PRB | without coalition | 130,516 |
| Ana Perugini | PT | PT / PC do B | 121,681 |
| Gilberto Nascimento | PSC | without coalition | 120,044 |
| Vicente Cândido | PT | PT / PC do B | 117,652 |
| Papa | PSDB | PSDB / DEM / PPS | 117,590 |
| Milton Monti | PR | without coalition | 115,942 |
| Floriano Pesaro | PSDB | PSDB / DEM / PPS | 113,949 |
| Ricardo Izar | PSD | PMDB / PROS / PP / PSD | 113,547 |
| Arnaldo Faria de Sá | PTB | without coalition | 112,940 |
| Edinho Araújo | PMDB | PMDB / PROS / PP / PSD | 112,780 |
| Nelson Marquezelli | PTB | without coalition | 112,711 |
| Paulo Teixeira | PT | PT / PC do B | 111,301 |
| Paulo Freire | PR | without coalition | 111,300 |
| Alexandre Leite | DEM | PSDB / DEM / PPS | 109,708 |
| Evandro Gussi | PV | without coalition | 109,591 |
| Luiz Lauro Filho | PSB | without coalition | 105,247 |
| Keiko Ota | PSB | without coalition | 102,963 |
| Nilto Tatto | PT | PT / PC do B | 101,196 |
| Herculano Passos | PSD | PMDB / PROS / PP / PSD | 92,583 |
| Goulart | PSD | PMDB / PROS / PP / PSD | 92,546 |
| Orlando Silva | PC do B | PT / PC do B | 90,641 |
| Flavinho | PSB | without coalition | 90,437 |
| Vicentinho | PT | PT / PC do B | 89,001 |
| Walter Ihoshi | PSD | PMDB / PROS / PP / PSD | 88,070 |
| Renata Abreu | PODE | PSL / PODE / PMN / PTC / AVANTE | 86,647 |
| Valmir Prascidelli | PT | PT / PC do B | 84,419 |
| José Mentor | PT | PT / PC do B | 82,368 |
| Eduardo Bolsonaro | PSC | without coalition | 82,224 |
| Vinicius Carvalho | PRB | without coalition | 80,643 |
| Roberto de Lucena | PV | without coalition | 67,191 |
| Dr. Sinval Malheiros | PV | without coalition | 59,362 |
| Capitão Augusto | PR | without coalition | 46,905 |
| Sérgio Reis | PRB | without coalition | 45,330 |
| Miguel Lombardi | PR | without coalition | 32,080 |
| Beto Mansur | PRB | without coalition | 31,301 |
| Marcelo Squassoni | PRB | without coalition | 30,315 |
| Fausto Pinato | PRB | without coalition | 22,097 |

Sergipe (8 federal deputies)

| Name | Party | Coalition | Votes |
|---|---|---|---|
| Adelson Barreto | PTB | PP / PTB / PSL / PSC / PR / PPS / DEM / PHS / PTC / PV / PSDB / PATRI / AVANTE / SD | 131,236 |
| Laércio Oliveira | SD | PP / PTB / PSL / PSC / PR / PPS / DEM / PHS / PTC / PV / PSDB / PATRI / AVANTE / SD | 84,198 |
| Fábio Mitidieri | PSD | PT / PDT / PSB / PMDB / PC do B / PRP / PROS / PSD / PRB / PSDC | 83,401 |
| Fábio Reis | PMDB | PT / PDT / PSB / PMDB / PC do B / PRP / PROS / PSD / PRB / PSDC | 80,895 |
| Valadares Filho | PSB | PT / PDT / PSB / PMDB / PC do B / PRP / PROS / PSD / PRB / PSDC | 68,199 |
| Pastor Jony | PRB | PT / PDT / PSB / PMDB / PC do B / PRP / PROS / PSD / PRB / PSDC | 53,455 |
| João Daniel | PT | PT / PDT / PSB / PMDB / PC do B / PRP / PROS / PSD / PRB / PSDC | 52,959 |
| André Moura | PSC | PP / PTB / PSL / PSC / PR / PPS / DEM / PHS / PTC / PV / PSDB / PATRI / AVANTE / SD | 71,523 |

Tocantins (8 federal deputies)

| Name | Party | Coalition | Votes |
|---|---|---|---|
| Dulce Miranda | PMDB | PMDB / PV / PT / PSD | 75,934 |
| Irajá Abreu | PSD | PMDB / PV / PT / PSD | 62,859 |
| Josi Nunes | PMDB | PMDB / PV / PT / PSD | 53,452 |
| Vicentinho Júnior | PSB | PRB / PP / PDT / PTB / PSL / PSC / PR / PPS / DEM / PRTB / PHS / PSB / PRP / PSDB / PATRI | 51,069 |
| César Halum | PRB | PRB / PP / PDT / PTB / PSL / PSC / PR / PPS / DEM / PRTB / PHS / PSB / PRP / PSDB / PATRI | 46,119 |
| Carlos Gaguim | PMDB | PMDB / PV / PT / PSD | 44,739 |
| Lázaro Botelho | PP | PRB / PP / PDT / PTB / PSL / PSC / PR / PPS / DEM / PRTB / PHS / PSB / PRP / PSDB / PATRI | 42,935 |
| Professora Dorinha | DEM | PRB / PP / PDT / PTB / PSL / PSC / PR / PPS / DEM / PRTB / PHS / PSB / PRP / PSDB / PATRI | 41,802 |

| Preceded by 54th Legislature | 55th Legislature; February 2015 to January 2019 | Succeeded by 56th Legislature |

== See also ==
- Federal government of Brazil
- National Congress of Brazil
- Federal Senate
- Chamber of Deputies
- Evangelical Caucus (pt)
