= Valmir Prascidelli =

Brazilian politician (born 1964)

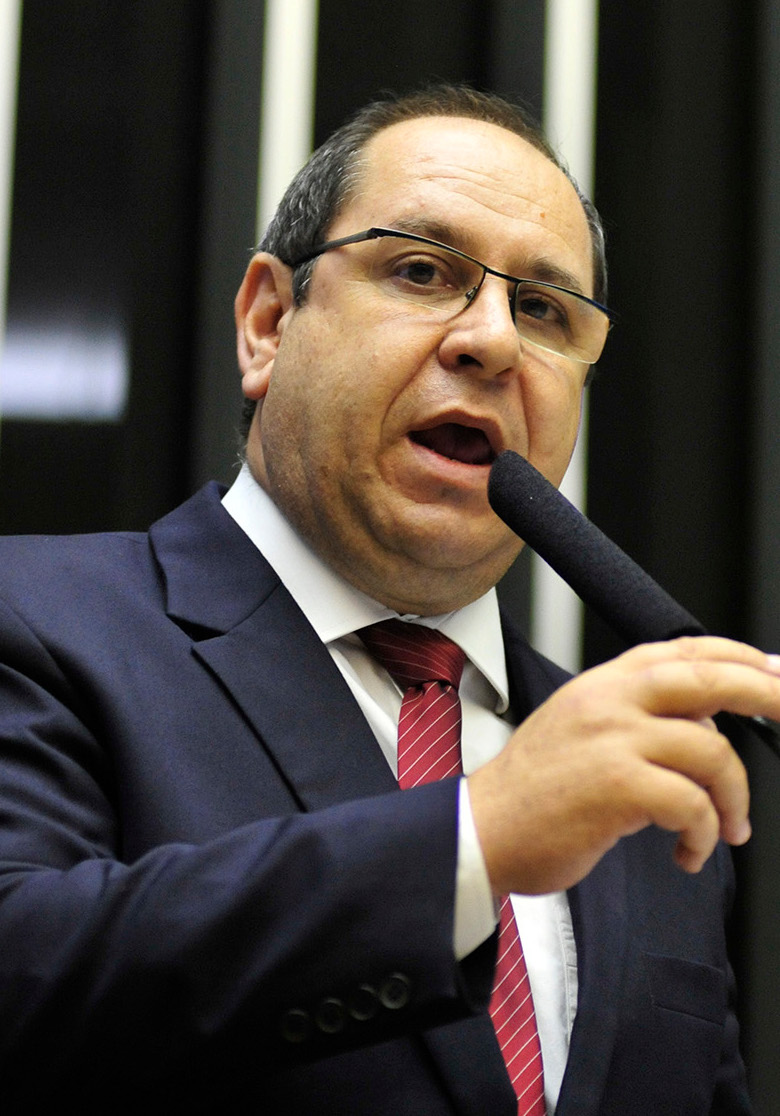
- Prascidelli in April 2015

Federal Deputy for São Paulo
- In office 1 February 2015 – 31 January 2019

Vice-Mayor of Osasco
- In office 1 February 2013 – 31 January 2015

Vereador of Osasco
- In office 1 February 2009 – 31 January 2012

Personal details
- Born: 9 April 1964 (age 62) Osasco, Brazil
- Party: PT (1981–)

Valmir Prascidelli (born 9 April 1964) is a Brazilian politician. He has spent his political career representing São Paulo, having served as federal deputy representative from 2015 to 2019.

== Personal life ==
Prascidelli is the son of Lourenço Prascidelli and Elza Bragante.

== Political career ==
Prascidelli voted against the impeachment motion of then-president Dilma Rousseff. Prascidelli voted in opposition to the 2017 Brazilian labor reform, and would vote in favor of a corruption investigation into Rousseff's successor Michel Temer.

Prascidelli ran for mayor of Osasco in 2016, but only received 9,850 votes or 3.54%, placing him fifth among all the candidates.
