= Walter Ihoshi =

Brazilian politician (born 1961)

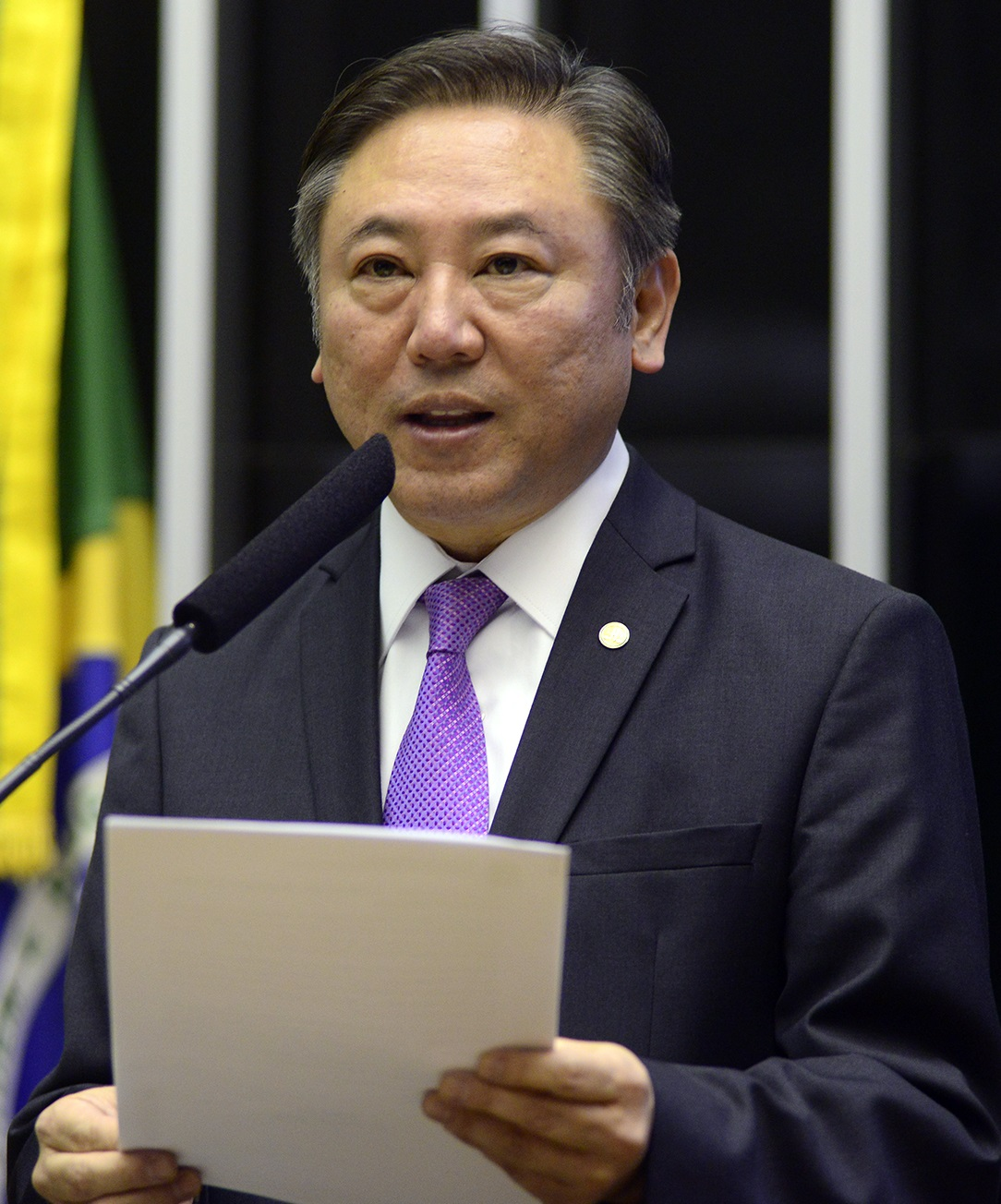
- Ihoshi in September 2015

Federal Deputy for São Paulo
- In office 1 February 2015 – 31 January 2019

State Deputy for São Paulo
- In office 1 February 1996 – 31 January 2007

Personal details
- Born: 17 July 1961 (age 65) São Paulo, Brazil
- Party: PSD

Walter Shindi Ihoshi (born 17 July 1961) is a Brazilian politician. He has spent his political career representing the state of São Paulo, having served as federal deputy representative from 2015 to 2019.

== Personal life ==
Walter is the son of Migaku Ihoshi and Yoshiko Ihoshi. After graduating with a B.A. in economics, Ihoshi completed his master's degree from 1987 to 1988 at University of California, Los Angeles.

== Political career ==
Ihoshi voted in favor of the impeachment against then-president Dilma Rousseff and political reformation. He would later vote in against opening a corruption investigation against Rousseff's successor Michel Temer, and voted in favor of the 2017 Brazilian labor reforms.

In 2018, Ihoshi and several other politicians who were not re-elected that years election were offered civil service positions by Onyx Lorenzoni for the cabinet for president elect Jair Bolsonaro. Ihoshi had previously been offered a similar position the year before by Bolsonaro's predecessor Michel Temer, although he turned the offer down due to his duties as federal deputy.
