= Felipe Carreras =

Brazilian politician (born 1975)

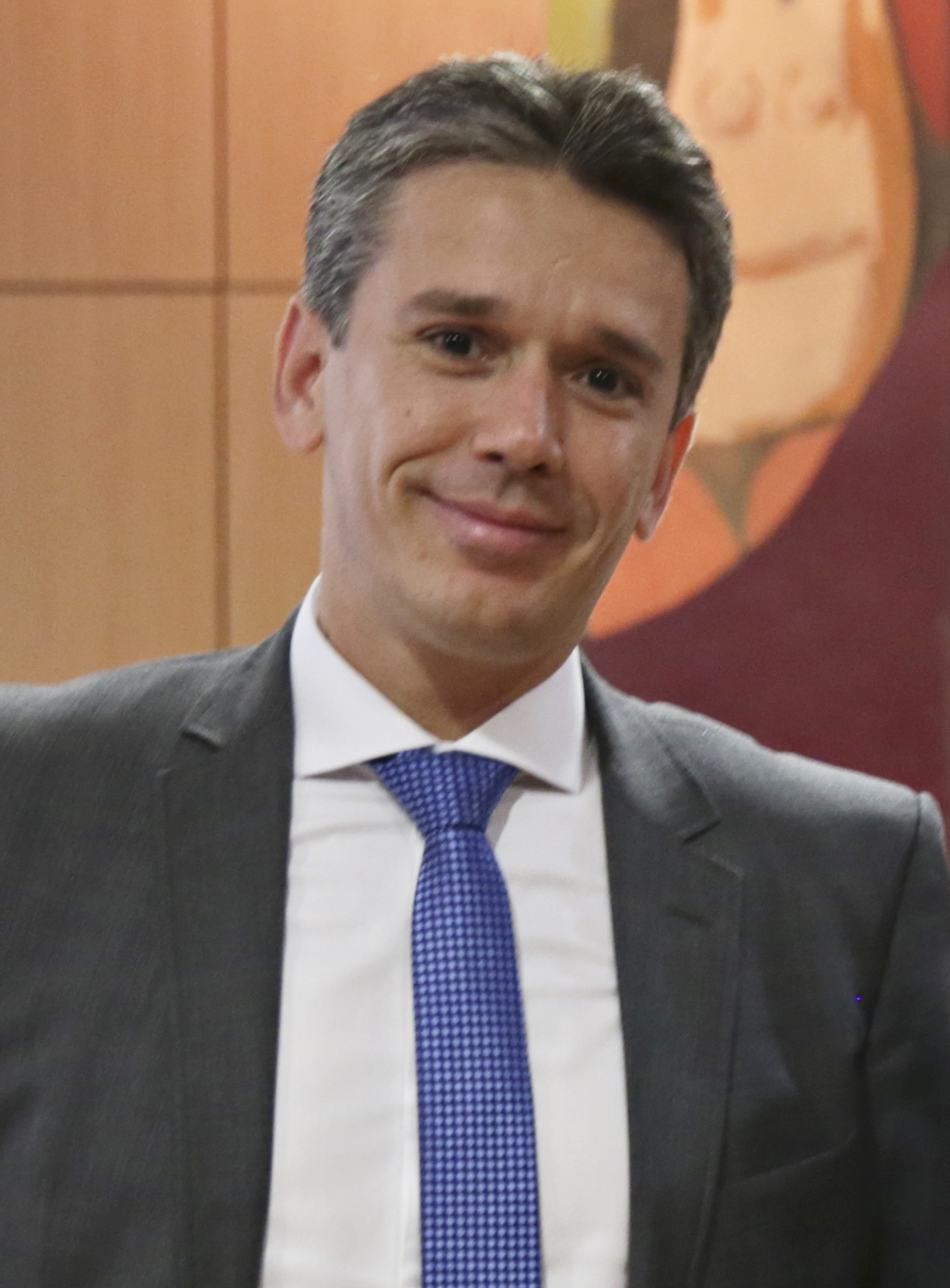
- Carreras in 2015

Member of the Chamber of Deputies
- Incumbent
- Assumed office 1 February 2015
- Constituency: Pernambuco

Personal details
- Born: 16 April 1975 (age 50)
- Party: Brazilian Socialist Party (since 1995)

Felipe Augusto Lyra Carreras (born 16 April 1975) is a Brazilian politician serving as a member of the Chamber of Deputies since 2015. In 2023, he served as group leader of the Brazilian Socialist Party.
