= Waldemir Moka =

Brazilian politician and doctor

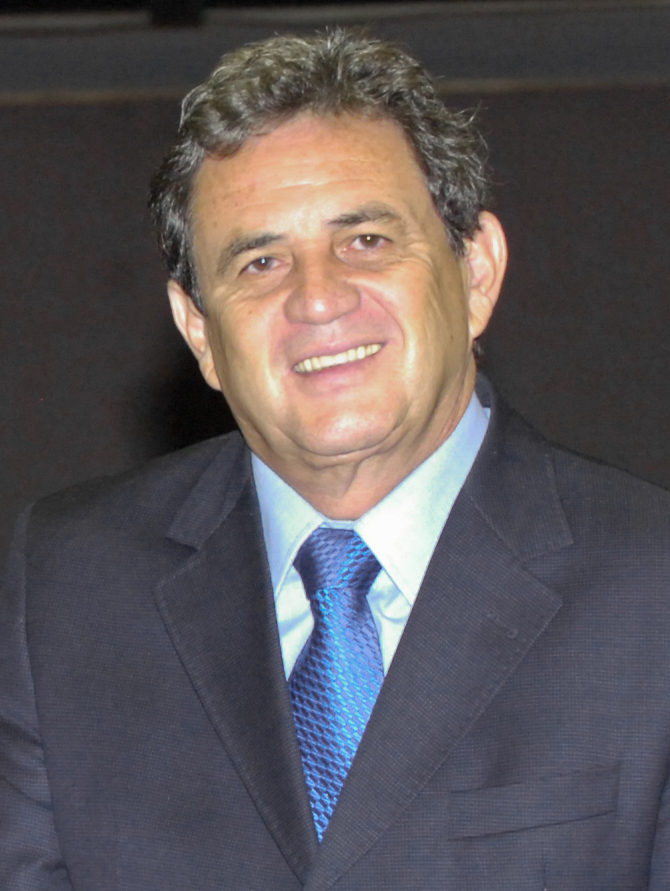

Senator from Mato Grosso do Sul
- Incumbent
- Assumed office February 1, 2011

Deputy from Mato Grosso do Sul
- In office February 1, 1999 – January 31, 2011

Personal details
- Born: October 10, 1951 (age 74) Bela Vista, Mato Grosso
- Party: Brazilian Democratic Movement Party
- Profession: Doctor

Waldemir Moka (born October 10, 1951) is a Brazilian politician and doctor. He has represented Mato Grosso do Sul in the Federal Senate since 2011. Previously, he was a Deputy from Mato Grosso do Sul from 1999 to 2011. He is a member of the Brazilian Democratic Movement Party.
