= Cidinho Santos =

Brazilian politician

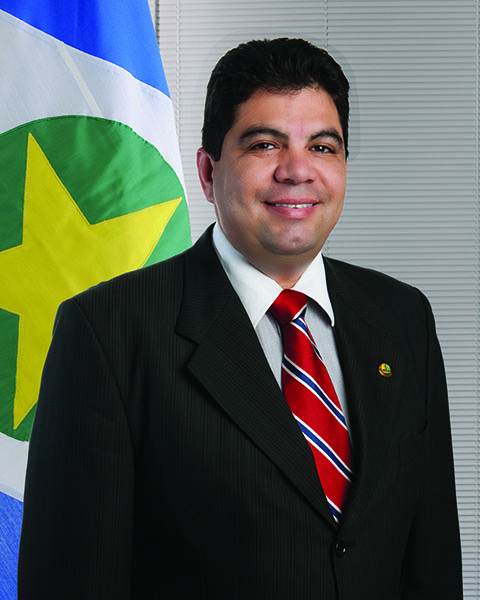
- Santos in 2012

Senator from Mato Grosso
- Incumbent
- Assumed office May 15, 2016
- In office March 13, 2014 – July 17, 2014
- In office August 9, 2012 – December 16, 2012

Mayor of Nova Marilândia
- In office January 1, 2001 – January 1, 2009
- In office January 1, 1993 – January 1, 1994

Personal details
- Born: June 19, 1968 (age 58) Janiópolis, PR
- Party: PL
- Profession: Businessman

José Aparecido dos Santos, also known as. Cidinho Santos (born June 19, 1968 in Janiópolis, Paraná) is a Brazilian businessman and politician, member of the Liberal Party (PL).

Santos served as mayor of the city of Nova Marilândia (MT) for three terms. He also served with the Mato-grossense Counties Association.

In the 2010 elections, he was elected as first substitute of Blairo Maggi in the Federal Senate. Santos assumed the office in many opportunities, the last being due to Maggi's nomination to the Ministry of Agriculture on the government of President Michel Temer.
