= Pedro Vilela =

Brazilian politician (born 1985)

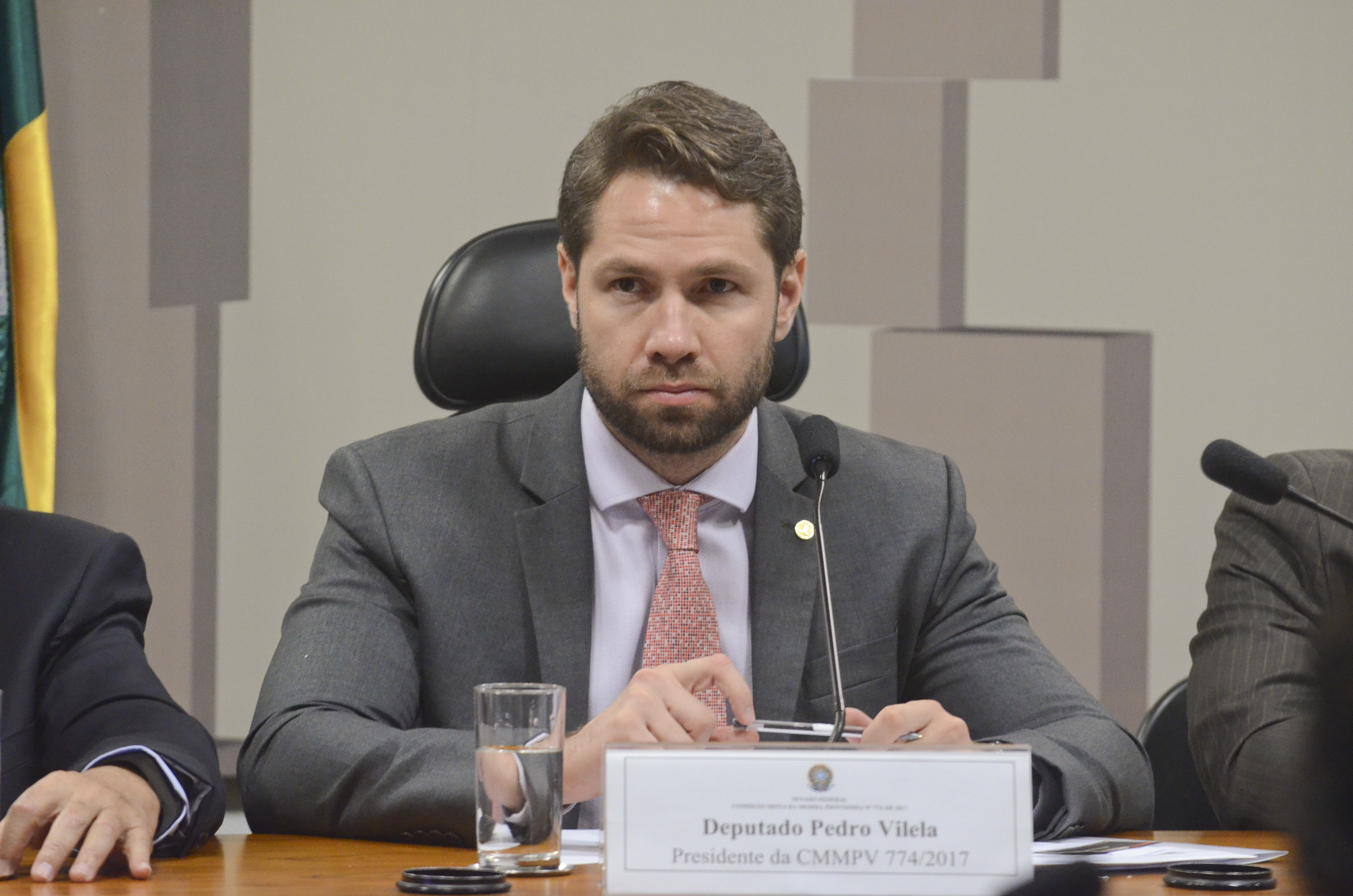
- Vilela in 2017

Member of the Chamber of Deputies
- In office 1 January 2021 – 31 January 2023
- Preceded by: João Henrique Caldas
- Constituency: Alagoas
- In office 1 February 2015 – 31 January 2019
- Constituency: Alagoas

Personal details
- Born: 1 May 1985 (age 40)
- Party: Brazilian Social Democracy Party (since 2005)
- Relatives: Teotônio Vilela (grandfather); Teotonio Vilela Filho (uncle); Avelar Brandão Vilela (granduncle)

Pedro Torres Brandão Vilela (born 1 May 1985) is a Brazilian politician. He was a member of the Chamber of Deputies from 2015 to 2019 and from 2021 to 2023. He is the grandson of Teotônio Vilela and the nephew of Teotonio Vilela Filho.
