= Raquel Muniz =

Brazilian politician (born 1963)

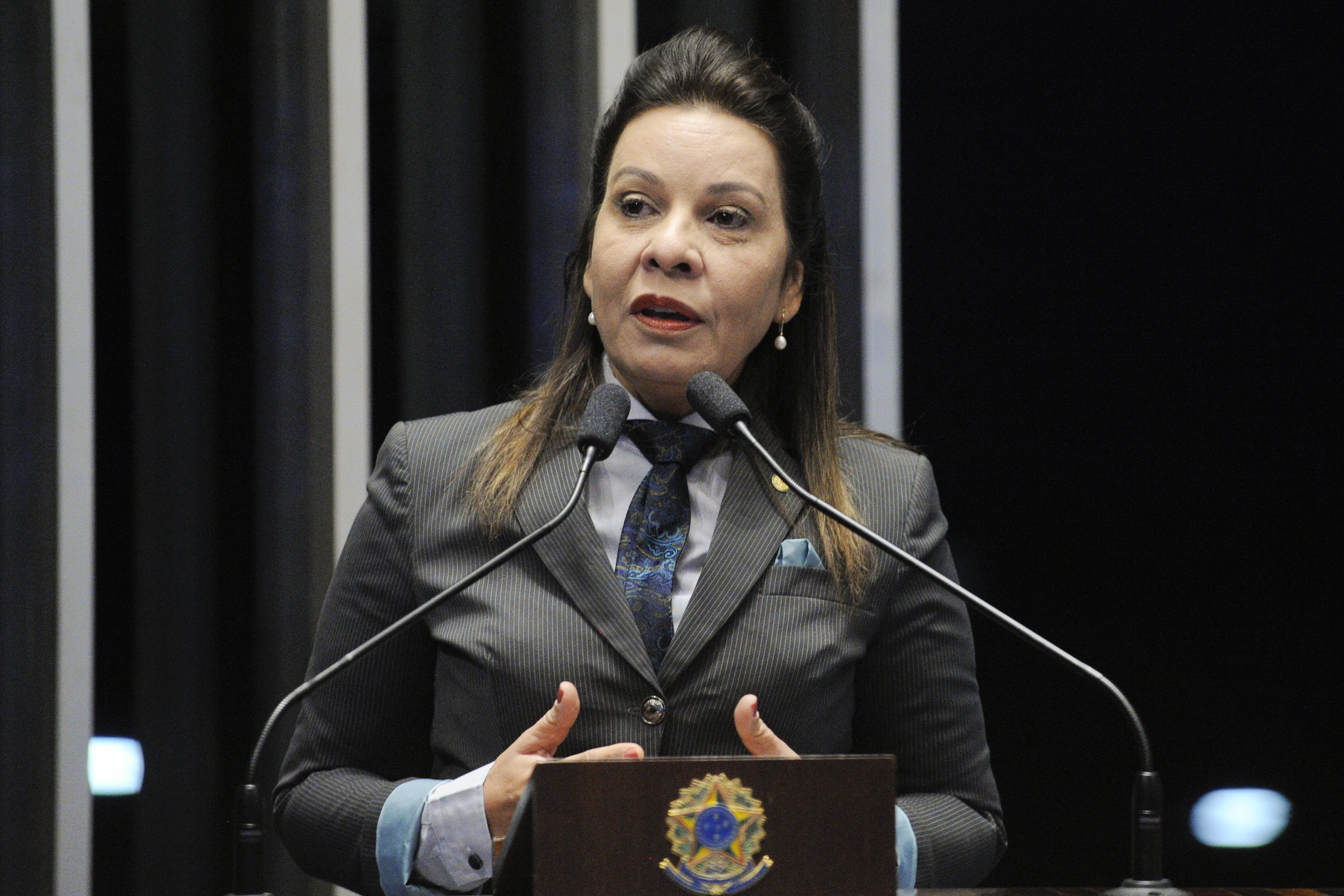
- Muniz addressing congress in March 2016

Federal Deputy for Minas Gerais
- In office 1 February 2015 – 31 January 2019

Personal details
- Born: 24 July 1963 (age 63) Montes Claros, MG, Brazil
- Party: PSD (2016–); PSC (2014–2016)

Tânia Raquel de Queiroz Muniz (born 24 July 1963) better known as Raquel Muniz, is a Brazilian politician as well as a medic and teacher. She has spent her political career representing her home state of Minas Gerais, having served in the chamber of deputies from 2015 to 2019.

== Personal life ==
Muniz was born to Elza Gonçalves de Queiroz. Prior to becoming a politician Muniz worked as a medic and teacher.

== Political career ==
Muniz voted in favor of the impeachment motion of then-president Dilma Rousseff. Muniz would vote against a similar corruption investigation into Rousseff's successor Michel Temer. She voted in favor of the 2017 Brazilian labor reforms.

In April 2018 Muniz was nominated to be head of the newly formed cultural committee in the federal chamber of deputies.
