= Carlos Gomes (Brazilian politician) =

Brazilian politician (born 1972)

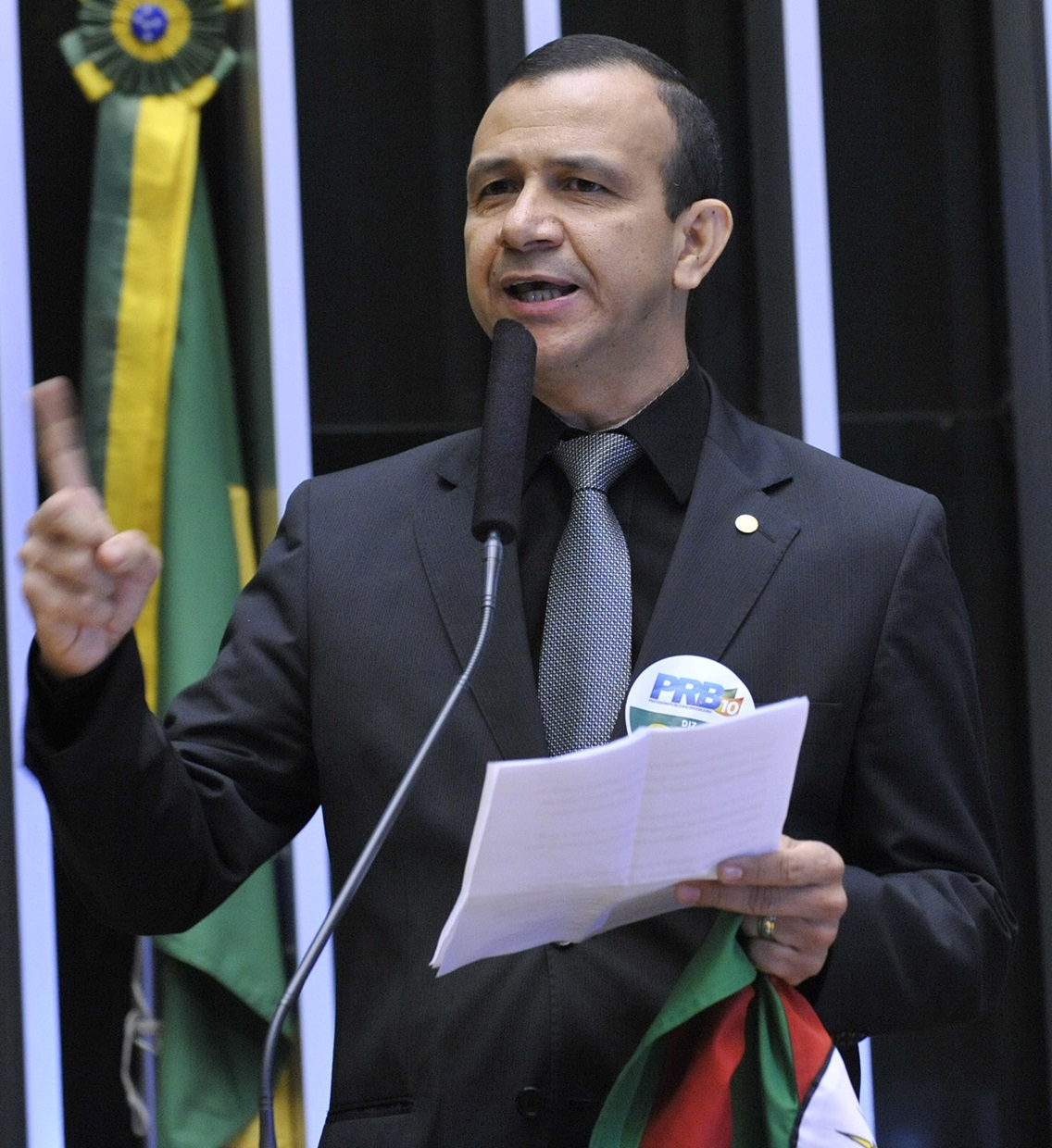
- Gomes in 2016

Member of the Chamber of Deputies
- Incumbent
- Assumed office 1 February 2015
- Constituency: Rio Grande do Sul

Personal details
- Born: 13 June 1972 (age 54)
- Party: Republicans (since 2009)

Antônio Carlos Gomes da Silva (born 13 June 1972) is a Brazilian politician serving as a member of the Chamber of Deputies since 2015. From 2007 to 2014, he was a member of the Legislative Assembly of Rio Grande do Sul.
