= Márcio Biolchi =

Brazilian politician (born 1979)

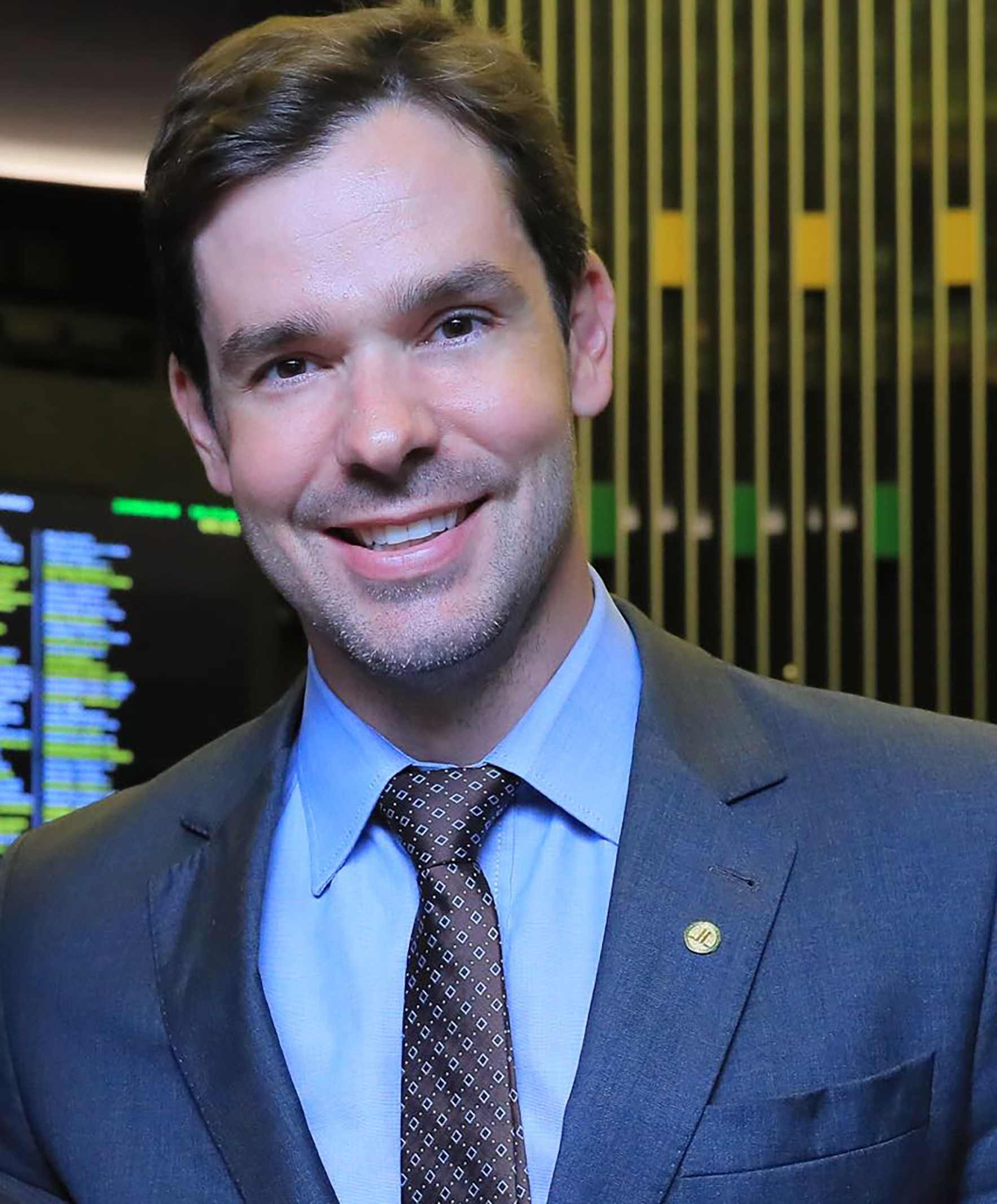
- Biolchi in 2018

Member of the Chamber of Deputies
- Incumbent
- Assumed office 1 February 2015
- Constituency: Rio Grande do Sul

Personal details
- Born: 23 May 1979 (age 46)
- Party: Brazilian Democratic Movement (since 1999)

Márcio Della Valle Biolchi (born 23 May 1979) is a Brazilian politician serving as a member of the Chamber of Deputies since 2015. From 2003 to 2015, he was a member of the Legislative Assembly of Rio Grande do Sul.
