= Betinho Gomes =

Brazilian politician (born 1975)

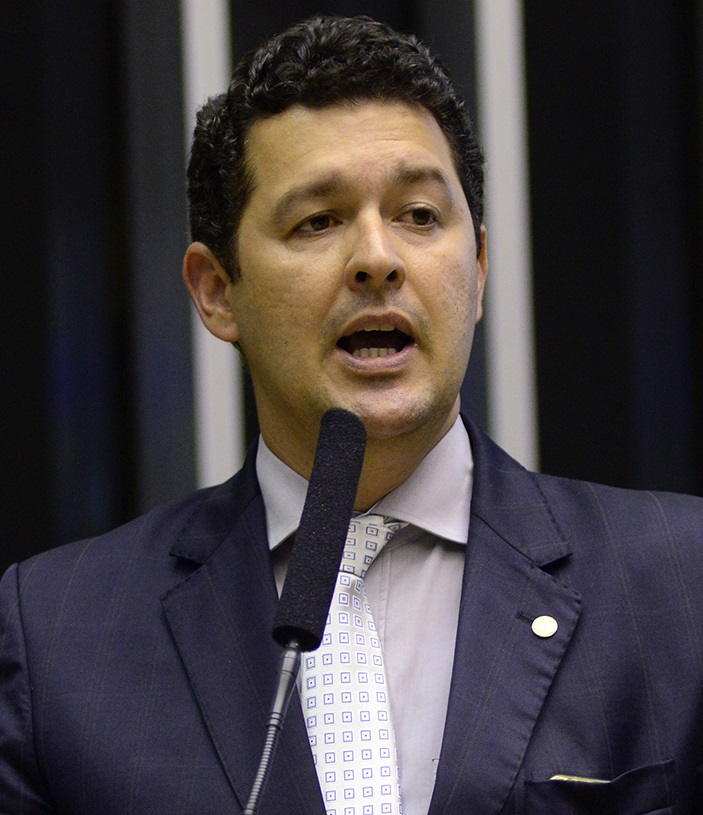
- Gomes in 2015

Member of the Chamber of Deputies
- In office 1 February 2015 – 31 January 2019
- Constituency: Pernambuco

Personal details
- Born: 27 April 1975 (age 50)
- Party: Brazilian Social Democracy Party (since 2007)
- Parent: Elias Gomes (father)

Heberte Lamarck Gomes Da Silva, better known as Betinho Gomes (born 27 April 1975), is a Brazilian politician. From 2015 to 2019, he was a member of the Chamber of Deputies. From 2003 to 2006 and from 2011 to 2014, he was a member of the Legislative Assembly of Pernambuco. He is the son of Elias Gomes.
