= Roberto Muniz =

Brazilian politician

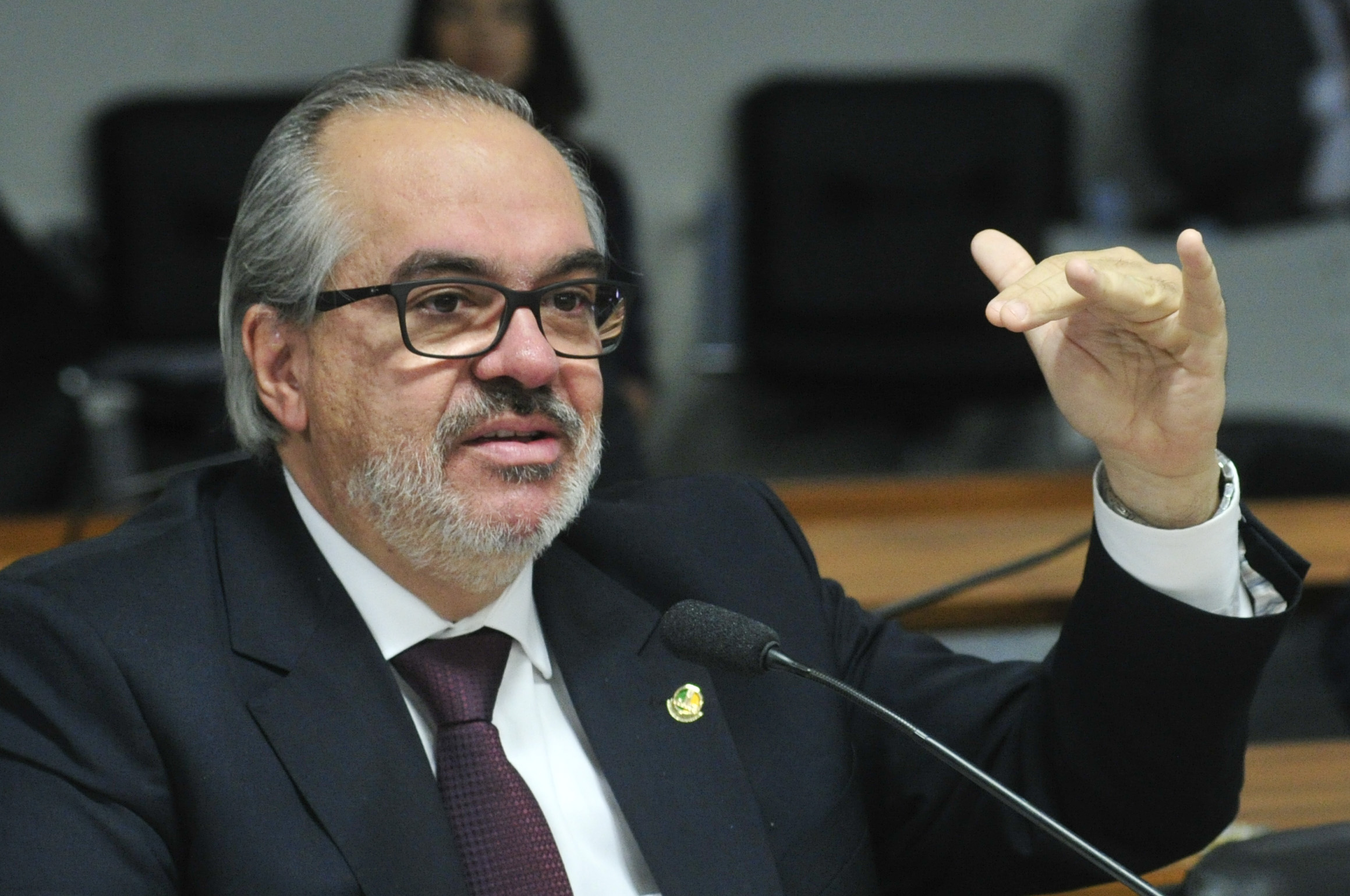

Senator from Bahia
- Incumbent
- Assumed office June 7, 2016

Deputy from Acre
- In office February 1, 2003 – January 31, 2011

Personal details
- Born: November 23, 1963 (age 62) Salvador, Bahia
- Party: Progressive Party
- Profession: Engineer

Roberto de Oliveira Muniz (born November 23, 1963) is a Brazilian politician. He has represented Bahia in the Federal Senate since 2016. Previously, he was a deputy from Bahia from 2003 to 2011. He is a member of the Progressive Party.
