= Delegado Waldir =

Brazilian politician (born 1962)

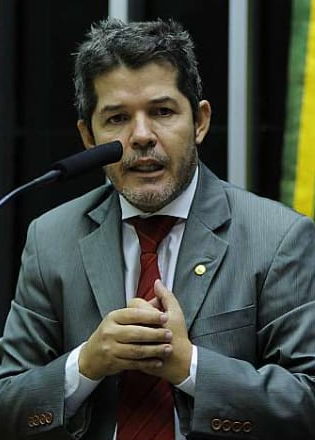
- Waldir in 2015

Member of the Chamber of Deputies
- In office 1 February 2015 – 31 January 2023
- Constituency: Goiás

Personal details
- Born: 28 December 1962 (age 63)
- Party: Brazil Union (since 2022)

Waldir Soares de Oliveira (born 28 December 1962), better known as Delegado Waldir, is a Brazilian politician. From 2015 to 2023, he was a member of the Chamber of Deputies. From 2018 to 2019, he served as group leader of the Social Liberal Party.
