= Fábio Sousa =

Brazilian politician

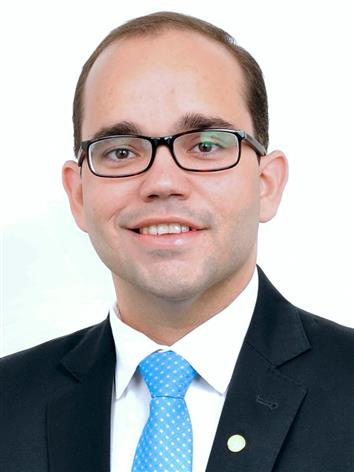
- Sousa in 2018

Federal Deputy for Goiás
- Incumbent
- Assumed office 1 February 2015

State Deputy for Goiás
- In office 2006–2014

Personal details
- Born: 11 September 1982 (age 42); Goiânia, Brazil
- Political party: PSDB
- Profession: Pastor, media personality, public relations manager

Fábio Fernandes de Sousa (born 11 September 1982) is a Brazilian politician. He has spent his political career representing Goiás, having served as state representative since 2015.

== Personal life ==
Sousa is the son of Cesar Augusto Machado de Sousa and Rubia Pinheiro Fernandes de Sousa. He is married to physician and pastor Priscila Sousa. A graduate of the Gestão Pública e Teologia, Sousa worked for a time for the evangelical television and radio station Nossa Gente na Fonte TV. Aside from being a pastor, Sousa currently works as a pastor, media personality, and a public relations manager. Sousa and his wife are both bishops of the evangelical church the Igreja Fonte da Vida.

== Political career ==
Sousa was first elected to the Goiás state legislative assembly in 2006 with 28,872 votes. In 2010 he was reelected with 37,132 votes. He became president of the Goiás in 2012 when his party, the PSDB, won a majority. That same year he was chosen by his party to run for the federal chamber of deputies in the .

Sousa voted in favor of the impeachment of then-president Dilma Rousseff. Sousa voted in favor of the 2017 Brazilian labor reform, and would vote in favor of a corruption investigation into Rousseff's successor Michel Temer.
