= Fábio Garcia =

Brazilian politician (born 1977)

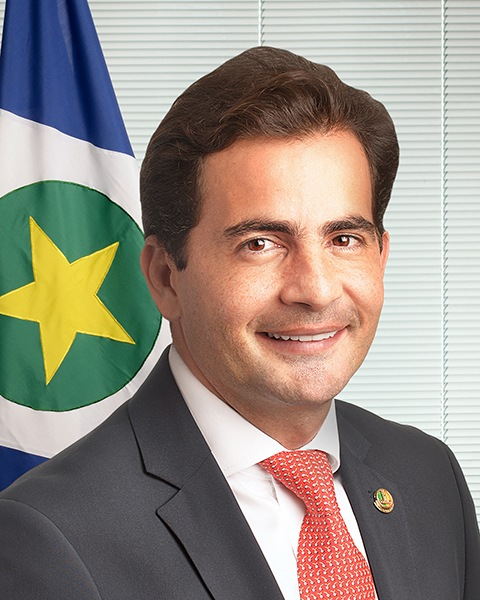
- Garcia in 2022

Member of the Chamber of Deputies
- Incumbent
- Assumed office 1 February 2023
- Constituency: Mato Grosso
- In office 1 February 2015 – 31 January 2019
- Constituency: Mato Grosso

Member of the Federal Senate
- In office 6 April 2022 – 4 August 2022
- Constituency: Mato Grosso

Personal details
- Born: 29 June 1977 (age 49)
- Party: Brazil Union (since 2022)
- Relatives: José Garcia Neto (grandfather)

Fábio Paulino Garcia (born 29 June 1977) is a Brazilian politician. He has been a member of the Chamber of Deputies since 2023, having previously served from 2015 to 2019. In 2022, he was a member of the Federal Senate. He is the grandson of José Garcia Neto.
