= Gabriel Guimarães =

Brazilian politician (born 1983)

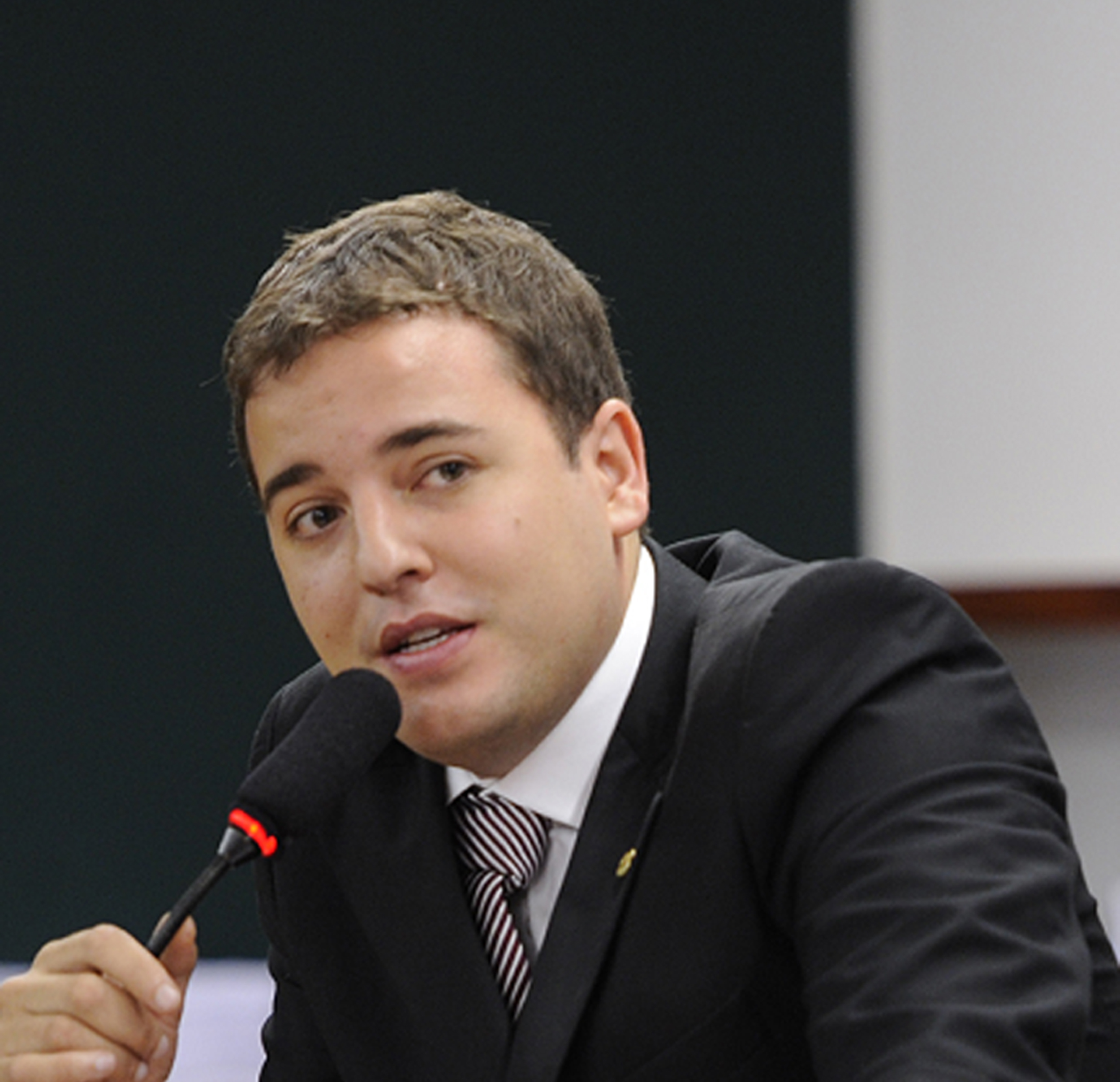
- Guimarães in 2012

Member of the Chamber of Deputies
- In office 1 February 2011 – 31 January 2019
- Constituency: Minas Gerais

Personal details
- Born: 6 June 1983 (age 42)
- Party: Workers' Party
- Parent: Virgílio Guimarães (father)
- Relatives: João Lima Guimarães (great-grandfather)

Gabriel Guimarães (born 6 June 1983) is a Brazilian politician. From 2011 to 2019, he was a member of the Chamber of Deputies. He is the son of Virgílio Guimarães.
