= Uldurico Júnior =

Brazilian politician (born 1992)

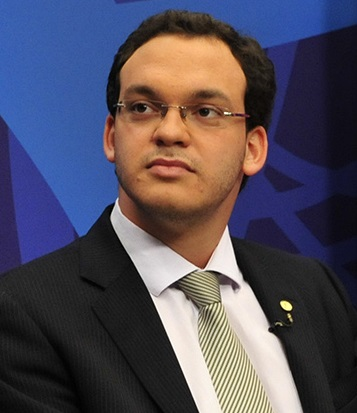

Member of the Chamber of Deputies
- In office 1 February 2015 – 31 January 2023
- Constituency: Bahia

Personal details
- Born: 30 January 1992 (age 34)
- Party: Brazilian Democratic Movement (since 2022)
- Parent: Uldurico Pinto (father)

Uldurico Alencar Pinto, better known as Uldurico Júnior (born 30 January 1992), is a Brazilian politician. From 2015 to 2023, he was a member of the Chamber of Deputies. He is the son of Uldurico Pinto.
