= Diego Garcia (Brazilian politician) =

Brazilian politician (born 1984)

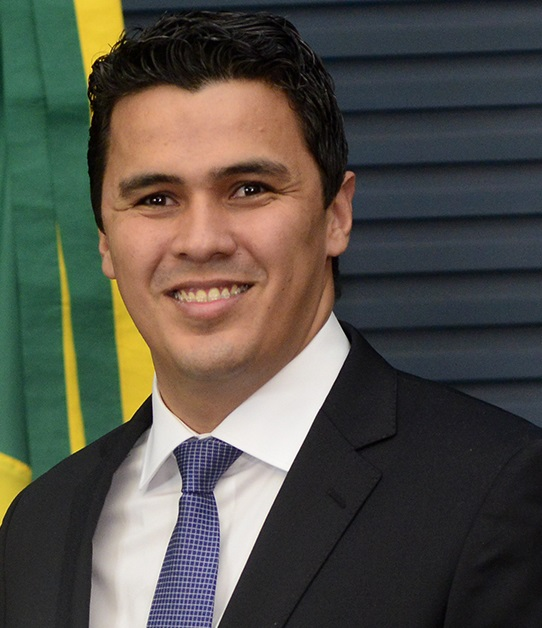
- Garcia in 2015

Member of the Chamber of Deputies
- Incumbent
- Assumed office 1 February 2015
- Constituency: Paraná

Personal details
- Born: 10 October 1984 (age 41)
- Party: Republicans (since 2022)

Diego Alexsander Gonçalo Paula Garcia (born 10 October 1984) is a Brazilian politician serving as a member of the Chamber of Deputies since 2015. From 2018 to 2019, he served as group leader of Podemos.
