= Kaio Maniçoba =

Brazilian politician (born 1983)

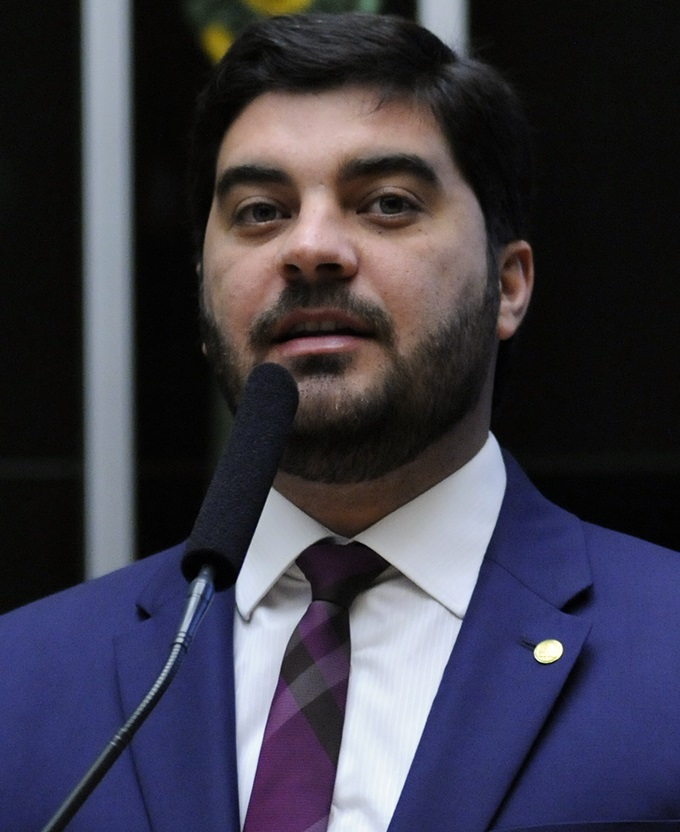
- Maniçoba in 2016

Member of the Chamber of Deputies
- In office 1 February 2015 – 31 January 2019
- Constituency: Pernambuco

Personal details
- Born: 14 November 1983 (age 42)
- Party: Progressistas (since 2022)

Kaio Cesar de Moura Maniçoba Novaes Ferraz (born 14 November 1983) is a Brazilian politician serving as secretary of tourism and leisure of Pernambuco since 2025. From 2015 to 2019, he was a member of the Chamber of Deputies.
