= Miguel Lombardi =

Brazilian politician (born 1964)

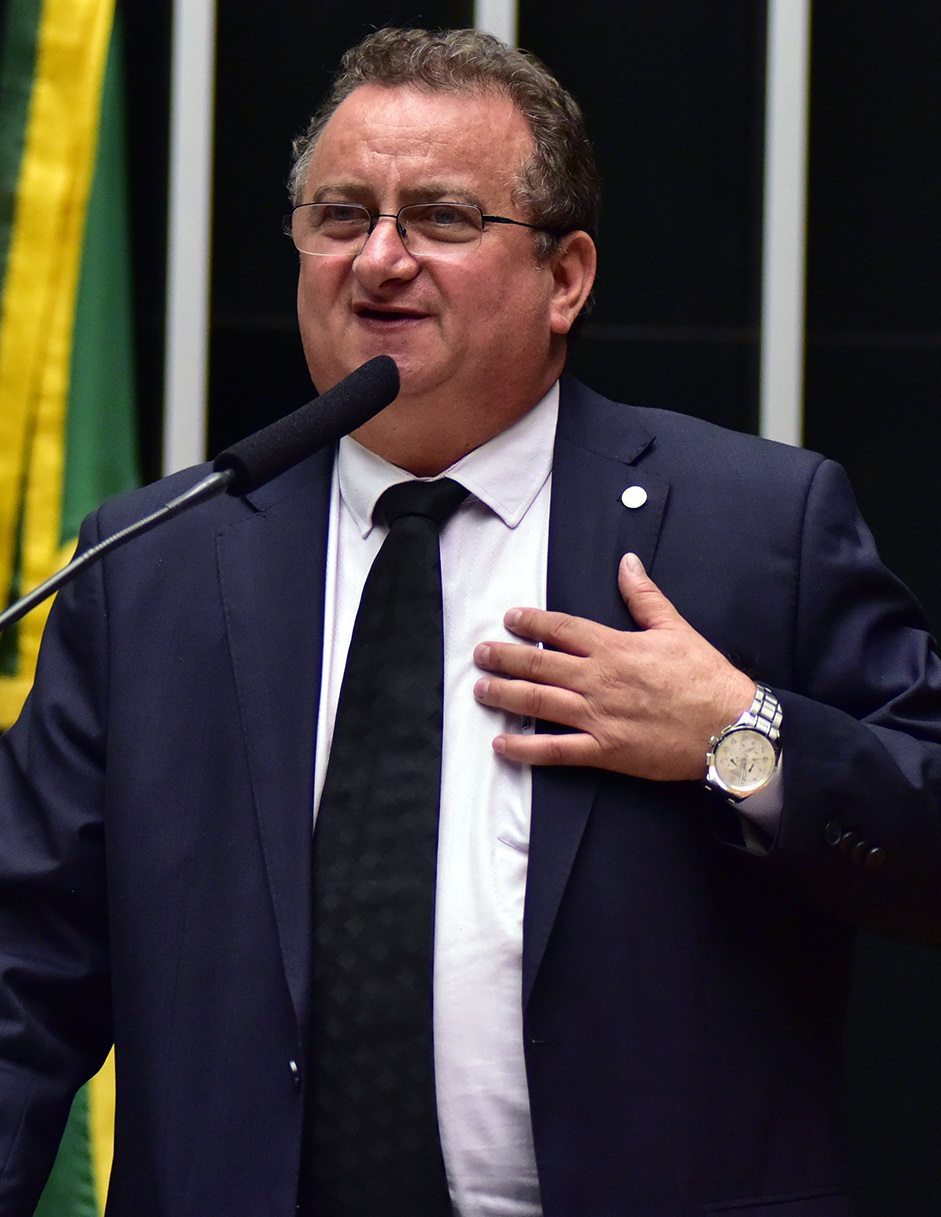
- Lombardi in 2016

Member of the Chamber of Deputies
- Incumbent
- Assumed office 1 February 2015
- Constituency: São Paulo

Personal details
- Born: 29 January 1964 (age 62)
- Party: Liberal Party (since 2006)

Miguel Lombardi (born 29 January 1964) is a Brazilian politician serving as a member of the Chamber of Deputies since 2015. From 1997 to 2000, he served as deputy mayor of Limeira.
