= Hélio Leite =

Brazilian politician and businessman

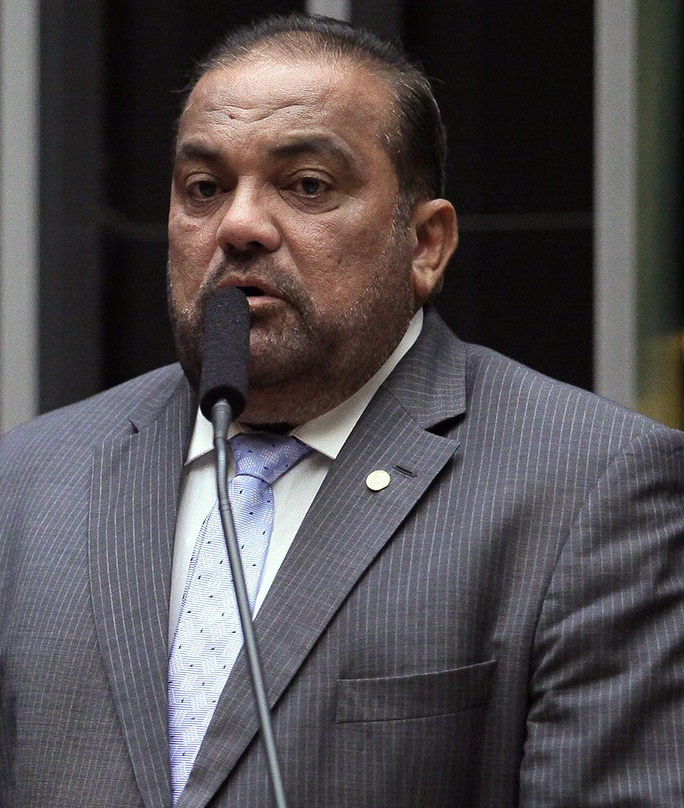
- Leite in October 2016

Federal Deputy for Pará
- Incumbent
- Assumed office 1 February 2015

Mayor of Castanhal
- In office 1 January 2005 – 1 January 2013

State Deputy of Pará
- In office 1 February 1999 – 1 January 2005

Vice Mayor of Castanhal
- In office 1 January 1997 – 1 February 1999

City Councilor for Castanhal
- In office 1 January 1989 – 1 January 1997

Alderman of Castanhal
- In office 1 January 1989 – 31 December 1996

Personal details
- Born: 9 December 1956 (age 69) Castanhal, Pará, Brazil
- Party: DEM (2012-present)
- Other political affiliations: PL (2007-2012); MDB (1989-2007)

Hélio Leite da Silva (born 9 December 1956) is a Brazilian politician and businessman. Born in Castanhal, he has served in the city council, deputy mayor and mayor, as well as state representative since 2015 for Pará.

== Political career ==
Leite voted in favor of the impeachment against then-president Dilma Rousseff and political reformation. Leite would later back Rousseff's successor Michel Temer against a similar corruption investigation and impeachment motion. Leite voted in favor of 2017 Brazil labor reform.

In September 2018 Conselho Indigenista Missionário (Indian Missionary Council), an activists branch of the Catholic church for indigenous people of Brazil, named 50 Brazilian politicians who had done the most to weaken the rights of indigenous people in Brazil, of which Leite was included in.
