= 54th Chamber of Deputies of Brazil =

In the 2010 Brazilian elections, 513 deputies were elected to the 54th Chamber of Deputies (February 1, 2011 – February 1, 2014). The election saw a 'red wave' leading to the Worker's Party (PT) achieving a record 88 deputies and their coalition For Brazil to keep on changing reaching 311 deputies.

== Acre ==
Name	Party	Individual votes
Gladson de Lima Cameli	PP	32,623
Antônia Luciléia Cruz Ramos Câmara	PSC	15,849
Henrique Afonso Soares Lima	PV	20,306
Maria Perpétua de Almeida	PCdoB	33,235
Márcio Miguel Bittar	PSDB	52,183
Taumaturgo Lima Cordeiro	PT	17,932
Sebastião Sibá Machado Oliveira	PT	25,158
Flaviano Flávio Baptista de Melo	PMDB	36,301

== Alagoas ==
Name	Party	Individual votes
José Renan Vasconcelos Calheiros Filho	PMDB	140,180
Rui Soares Palmeira	PSDB	118,363
Roseane Cavalcante de Freitas	PTdoB	90,021
Maurício Quintella Malta Lessa	PR	54,937
Arthur César Pereira de Lira	PP	84,676
Joaquim Beltrão Siqueira	PMDB	77,832
Givaldo de Sá Gouveia	PSB	92,268
Célia Maria Barbosa Rocha	PTB	124,504
João José Pereira de Lyra	PSD	111,104

== Amapá ==
Name	Party	Individual votes
Luiz Carlos Gomes dos Santos Júnior	PSDB	10,945
Vinícius de Azevedo Gurgel	PRTB	21,479
David Samuel Alcolumbre Tobelem	DEM	14,655
Marcivânia do Socorro da Rocha Flexa	PT	19,061
Evandro Costa Milhomem	PCdoB	13,974
Maria Dalva de Souza Figueiredo	PT	20,203
Fátima Lúcia Pelaes	PMDB	14,193
Sebastião Ferreira da Rocha	PDT	12,739

== Amazonas ==
Name	Party	Individual votes
Rebecca Martins Garcia	PP	146,665
Raimundo Sabino Castelo Branco Maues	PTB	93,112
Silas Câmara	PSD	127,134
José Henrique Oliveira	PR	85,535
Francisco Edinaldo Praciano	PT	166,387
Pauderney Avelino	DEM	100,199
Carlos Alberto Cavalcante de Souza	PSD	112,393
Átila Sidney Lins de Albuquerque	PMDB	131,429

== Bahia ==
Name	Party	Individual votes
João Luiz Correia Argôlo dos Santos	PP	68,025
Antônio Carlos Peixoto de Magalhães Neto	DEM	328,450
Fábio Loureiro Souto	DEM	65,985
João Carlos Paolilo Bacelar Filho	PR	75,327
Márcio Carlos Marinho	PRB	157,917
Fernando Dantas Torres	PSD	79,204
Antônio Luiz Paranhos Ribeiro Leite de Brito	PTB	70,209
Oziel Alves de Oliveira	PDT	81,811
Arthur de Oliveira Maia da Silva	PMDB	74,134
Valmir Carlos da Assunção	PT	132,999
Erivelton Lima Santana	PSC	69,765
Félix de Almeida Mendonça Júnior	PDT	148,885
Cláudio Cajado Sampaio	DEM	72,098
Edson Sampaio Pimenta	PCdoB	103,940
Maurício Gonçalves Trindade	PR	77,335
Lúcio Quadros Vieira Lima	PMDB	221,616
Rui Costa dos Santos	PT	212,157
Sérgio Luís Lacerda Brito	PSC	71,889
Afonso Bandeira Florence	PT	143,795
Nelson Pelegrino	PT	202,798
Alice Mazzuco Portugal	PCdoB	101,588
Amauri Santos Teixeira	PT	63,729
Josias Gomes da Silva	PT	69,619
Jutahy Magalhães Júnior	PSDB	110,268
Waldenor Alves Pereira Filho	PT	87,930
Daniel Almeida	PCdoB	135,817
Geraldo Simões de Oliveira	PT	75,977
Jânio Natal Andrade Borges	PRP	41,585
Paulo Sérgio Paranhos de Magalhães	PSD	53,620
Luiz Alberto Silva dos Santos	PT	63,686
Roberto Pereira de Britto	PP	64,126
Mário Sílvio Mendes Negromonte	PP	169,209
José Nunes Soares	PSD	70,483
José Eduardo Vieira Ribeiro	PT	109,109
José Alves Rocha	PR	73,935
Antônio José Imbassahy da Silva	PSDB	112,630
Marcos Antônio Medrado	PDT	68,216
João Felipe de Souza Leão	PP	203,604
José Carlos Leão de Araújo	PSD	69,564

== Ceará ==
Name	Party	Individual votes
Domingos Gomes de Aguiar Neto	PSB	246,591
André Peixoto Figueiredo Lima	PDT	115,647
Antônio Eudes Xavier	PT	97,266
Genecias Mateus Noronha	PMDB	176,286
José Guimarães (politician)	PT	210,366
Artur José Vieira Bruno	PT	133,152
Francisco Danilo Bastos Forte	PMDB	100,009
José Airton Félix Cirilo da Silva	PT	103,611
João Ananias Vasconcelos Neto	PCdoB	128,718
Aníbal Ferreira Gomes	PMDB	162,037
Maria Gorete Pereira	PR	98,209
José Arnon Cruz Bezerra de Menezes	PTB	106,121
Raimundo Gomes de Matos	PSDB	86,342
Antônio Balhmann Cardoso Nunes Filho	PSB	88,562
Edson da Silva	PSB	135,078
Raimundo Antônio de Macêdo	PMDB	116,310
Francisco Lopes da Silva	PCdoB	95,584
Manoel Salviano Sobrinho	PSD	76,915
Francisco Ariosto Holanda	PSB	91,846
José Linhares Ponte	PP	92,220
Carlos Mauro Cabral Benevides	PMDB	109,710
Vicente Ferreira de Arruda Coelho	PR	97,352

== Distrito Federal ==
Name	Party	Individual votes
José Antônio Machado Reguffe	PDT	266,465
Paulo Tadeu Vale da Silva	PT	164,555
Jaqueline Maria Roriz	PMN	100,051
Luiz Carlos Pietschmann	PMDB	51,491
Ronaldo Fonseca de Souza	PR	67,920
Érika Juca Kokay	PT	72,651
Izalci Lucas Ferreira	PSDB	97,914
Geraldo Magela Pereira	PT	86,276

== Espírito Santo ==
Name	Party	Individual votes
Lauriete Rodrigues de Almeida	PSC	69,818
Sueli Rangel Silva Vidigal	PDT	141,578
Audifax Charles Pimentel Barcelos	PSB	161,856
César Roberto Colnaghi	PSDB	80,728
Carlos Humberto Mannato	PDT	60,700
Paulo Roberto Foletto	PSB	99,312
Iriny Nicolau Corres Lopes	PT	74,534
Lelo Coimbra	PMDB	105,458
Jorge Silva	PDT	67,262
Rosilda de Freitas	PMDB	96,454

== Goiás ==
Name	Party	Individual votes
Heuler Abreu Cruvinel	PSD	76,796
Leandro Vilela Velloso	PMDB	102,435
Thiago Mello Peixoto da Silveira	PSD	90,719
Flávia Carreiro Albuquerque Morais	PDT	152,553
Armando Vergílio dos Santos Júnior	PSD	103,231
Leonardo Moura Vilela	PSDB	91,924
João Campos de Araújo	PSDB	135,968
Carlos Alberto Leréia da Silva	PSDB	98,427
João Sandes Júnior	PP	89,230
Sandro da Mabel Antônio Scodro	PR	148,687
Pedro Pinheiro Chaves	PMDB	94,318
Rubens Otoni Gomide	PT	171,382
Jovair Oliveira Arantes	PTB	147,624
Vilmar da Silva Rocha	PSD	85,773
Ronaldo Ramos Caiado	DEM	167,591
Roberto Egídio Balestra	PP	97,424
Iris de Araújo Rezende Machado	PMDB	185,934

== Maranhão ==
Name	Party	Individual votes
José Alberto Oliveira Filho	PMDB	89,704
Edivaldo de Holanda Braga Júnior	PTC	104,015
Cléber Verde Cordeiro Mendes	PRB	126,896
Hélio Batista dos Santos	PSDB	58,413
José Eleonildo Soares	PSDB	80,259
Carlos Orleans Brandão Júnior	PSDB	77,733
José Sarney Filho	PV	134,313
Domingos Francisco Dutra Filho	PT	81,101
Lourival Mendes da Fonseca Filho	PTdoB	30,036
Waldir Maranhão Cardoso	PP	106,646
José Ribamar Costa Alves	PSB	62,631
Luciano Fernandes Moreira	PMDB	125,915
Pedro Fernandes Ribeiro	PTB	113,503
Sétimo Waquim	PMDB	86,399
Gastão Dias Vieira	PMDB	134,665
Nice Lobão	DEM	95,129
José Vieira Lins	PR	76,629
Pedro Novais Lima	PMDB	89,658

== Mato Grosso ==
Name	Party	Individual votes
Valtenir Luiz Pereira	PSB	101,907
Saguas Moraes Sousa	PT	88,654
Pedro Henry Neto	PP	81,454
Wellington Antônio Fagundes	PR	145,460
Homero Alves Pereira	PSD	112,421
Eliene José de Lima	PSD	66,482
Júlio José de Campos	DEM	72,560
Carlos Gomes Bezerra	PMDB	90,780

== Mato Grosso do Sul ==
Name	Party	Individual votes
Fábio Ricardo Trad	PMDB	82,121
Marçal Gonçalves Leite Filho	PMDB	60,957
Luiz Henrique Mandetta	DEM	78,733
Reinaldo Azambuja Silva	PSDB	122,213
Vander Loubet	PT	116,330
Edson Giroto	PR	147,343
Geraldo Resende Pereira	PMDB	79,299
Antônio Carlos Biffi	PT	60,039

== Minas Gerais ==
Name	Party	Individual votes
Gabriel Moreira de Andrade	PT	137,120
Renzo Braz	PP	102,573
Miguel Corrêa da Silva Júnior	PT	113,388
Diego Leonardo de Andrade Carvalho	PSD	90,073
Odair José da Cunha	PT	165,644
Bernardo de Vasconcellos Moreira	PR	119,029
Leonardo Lemos Barros Quintão	PMDB	141,737
Weliton Fernandes Prado	PT	234,397
Dimas Fabiano Toledo Júnior	PP	146,061
Reginaldo Lázaro de Oliveira Lopes	PT	176,241
Rodrigo Moreira Ladeira Grilo	PSL	40,093
George Hilton dos Santos Cecílio	PRB	92,282
Luís Henrique de Oliveira Resende	PTdoB	58,677
Eros Ferreira Biondini	PTB	208,058
Rodrigo Batista de Castro	PSDB	271,306
Alexandre Silveira de Oliveira	PPS	199,418
João Carlos Siqueira	PT	111,651
Júlio César Delgado	PSB	70,945
Ademir Camilo Prates Rodrigues	PSD	72,967
Olavo Bilac Pinto Neto	PR	117,230
José Silva Soares	PDT	110,570
Paulo Abi-Ackel	PSDB	105,422
Gilmar Alves Machado	PT	192,657
Aelton José de Freitas	PR	106,192
Fábio Augusto Ramalho dos Santos	PV	96,309
João Lucio Magalhães Bifano	PMDB	101,639
José Humberto Soares	PHS	51,824
Antônio Pinheiro Júnior	PP	179,649
Marcus Vinícius Caetano Pestana da Silva	PSDB	161,892
Narcio Rodrigues da Silveira	PSDB	101,090
Eduardo Luiz Barros Barbosa	PSDB	120,769
Walter da Rocha Tosta	PMN	86,192
Domingos Sávio Campos Resende	PSDB	143,113
Luiz Fernando Ramos Faria	PP	105,413
Antônio Eustáquio Andrade Ferreira	PMDB	117,722
Lincoln Diniz Portela	PR	109,045
Jaime Martins Filho	PR	180,117
Paulo Piau Nogueira	PMDB	90,907
José Saraiva Felipe	PMDB	90,097
José Leonardo Costa Monteiro	PT	85,891
Carlaile de Jesus Pedrosa	PSDB	128,304
Marcos Montes Cordeiro	PSD	94,077
Eduardo Brandão de Azeredo	PSDB	123,649
Carlos do Carmo Andrade Melles	DEM	100,325
Maria do Socorro Jô Moraes	PCdoB	105,977
Geraldo Thadeu Pedreira dos Santos	PSD	87,826
Mário de Oliveira	PSC	100,811
Antônio Roberto Soares	PV	88,344
Márcio Reinaldo Dias Moreira	PP	124,551
Aracely de Paula	PR	81,129
Lael Vieira Varella	DEM	243,884
Newton Cardoso	PMDB	137,680
Mauro Ribeiro Lopes	PMDB	93,035

== Pará ==
Name	Party	Individual votes
Lúcio Dutra Vale	PR	142,116
Cláudio Alberto Castelo Branco Puty	PT	120,881
José Roberto de Oliveira Faro	PT	169,504
Wladimir Afonso da Costa Rabelo	PSD	236,514
José Benito Priante Júnior	PMDB	172,068
Zenaldo Rodrigues Coutinho Júnior	PSDB	154,265
José Geraldo Torres da Silva	PT	119,544
José da Cruz Marinho	PSC	147,615
Arnaldo Jordy Figueiredo	PPS	201,171
Esmerino Neri Batista Filho	PT	126,055
Nilson Pinto de Oliveira	PSDB	140,893
Joaquim de Lira Maia	DEM	119,548
Wandenkolk Pasteur Gonçalves	PSDB	68,547
Giovanni Corrêa Queiroz	PDT	93,461
Josué Bengtson	PTB	112,212
Elcione Therezinha Zahluth Barbalho	PMDB	209,635
Asdrubal Bentes	PMDB	87,681

== Paraíba ==
Name	Party	Individual votes
Hugo Motta	PMDB	86,150
José Wilson Santiago Filho	PMDB	105,822
Efraim de Araújo Morais Filho	DEM	87,014
Benjamim Gomes Maranhao Neto	PMDB	94,984
Ruy Manoel Carneiro Barbosa de Aca Belchior	PSDB	108,644
Aguinaldo Velloso Borges Ribeiro	PP	87,572
Romero Rodrigues Veiga	PSDB	95,293
Manoel Alves da Silva Júnior	PMDB	108,041
José Wellington Roberto	PR	113,167
Damião Feliciano	PDT	87,134
Ozanilda Gondim Vital do Rêgo	PMDB	79,412
Luiz Albuquerque Couto	PT	95,555

== Paraná ==
Name	Party	Individual votes
Carlos Roberto Massa Júnior	PSC	358,924
José Carlos Becker de Oliveira e Silva	PT	109,565
João José de Arruda Júnior	PMDB	126,092
Sandro Alex Cruz de Oliveira	PPS	95,840
Fernando Destito Francischini	PSDB	130,522
Fernando Lúcio Giacobo	PR	119,892
Maria Aparecida Borghetti	PP	147,910
Alex Canziani Silveira	PTB	149,693
André Luiz Vargas Ilario	PT	151,769
Cleusa Rosane Ribas Ferreira	PV	47,674
Assis Miguel do Couto	PT	94,745
Edmar de Souza Arruda	PSC	61,309
Hermes Parcianello	PMDB	154,910
Angelo Carlos Vanhoni	PT	108,886
Jacob Alfredo Stoffels Kaefer	PSDB	102,345
Cezar Augusto Carollo Silvestri	PPS	87,586
Eduardo Francisco Sciarra	PSD	102,232
Abelardo Luiz Lupion Mello	DEM	79,704
Florisvaldo Fier	PT	93,509
Luiz Carlos Jorge Hauly	PSDB	116,165
Leopoldo Costa Meyer	PSB	38,649
Osmar José Serraglio	PMDB	121,700
Hidekazu Takayama	PSC	109,895
Rubens Bueno	PPS	123,178
Nelson Padovani	PSC	63,289
Dilceu João Sperafico	PP	107,820
Nelson Meurer	PP	114,648
Moacir Micheletto	PMDB	121,285
André Zacharow	PMDB	101,579
Reinhold Stephanes	PSD	95,147

== Pernambuco ==
Name	Party	Individual votes
Fernando Bezerra de Souza Coelho Filho	PSB	166,493
Bruno Cavalcanti de Araújo	PSDB	121,383
Anderson Ferreira Rodrigues	PR	48,435
Eduardo Henrique da Fonte de Albuquerque Silva	PP	330,520
Wolney Queiroz Maciel	PDT	113,885
Danilo Jorge de Barros Cabral	PSB	120,871
José Mendonça Bezerra Filho	DEM	142,699
Luciana Barbosa de Oliveira Santos	PCdoB	105,253
Raul Jean Louis Henry Júnior	PMDB	90,106
Augusto Rodrigues Coutinho de Melo	DEM	70,096
Francisco Eurico da Silva	PSB	185,870
Maurício Rands Coelho Barros	PT	126,812
Roberto Sérgio Ribeiro Coutinho Teixeira	PP	55,450
Sílvio Serafin Costa	PTB	78,984
José Augusto Maia	PTB	46,267
João Paulo Lima e Silva	PT	264,250
Fernando Dantas Ferro	PT	58,121
Jorge Wicks Côrte Real	PTB	60,643
Pedro Eugênio de Castro Toledo Cabral	PT	80,657
Severino Sergio Estelita Guerra	PSDB	167,117
Ana Arraes	PSB	387,581
Luiz Gonzaga Patriota	PSB	118,999
José Severiano Chaves	PTB	66,671
Carlos Eduardo Cintra da Costa Pereira	PSC	72,363
Inocêncio Gomes de Oliveira	PR	198,407

== Piauí ==
Name	Party	Individual votes
Marllos Rossano Ribeiro Gonçalves de Sampaio	PMDB	141,504
Iracema Maria Portela Nunes Nogueira Lima	PP	91,352
Francisco de Assis Carvalho Gonçalves	PT	99,332
Jesus Rodrigues Alves	PT	69,287
Osmar Ribeiro de Almeida Júnior	PCdoB	95,985
Marcelo Costa e Castro	PMDB	171,697
Júlio César de Carvalho Lima	PSD	109,328
Átila Freitas Lira	PSB	120,528
Hugo Napoleão do Rego Neto	PSD	112,731
José Francisco Paes Landim	PTB	90,261

== Rio de Janeiro ==
Name	Party	Individual votes
Filipe de Almeida Pereira	PSC	98,280
Glauber de Medeiros Braga	PSB	57,549
Leonardo Carneiro Monteiro Picciani	PMDB	165,630
Áureo Lídio Moreira Ribeiro	PRTB	29,009
Cristiano José Rodrigues de Souza	PTdoB	29,176
Felipe Leone Bornier de Oliveira	PHS	44,236
Andreia Almeida Zito dos Santos	PSDB	82,832
Jean Wyllys de Matos Santos	PSOL	13,018
Pedro Paulo Carvalho Teixeira	PMDB	105,406
Rodrigo Bethlem Fernandes	PMDB	74,312
Alessandro Lucciola Molon	PT	129,515
Rodrigo Felinto Ibarra Epitácio Maia	DEM	86,162
Marcelo Viviani Gonçalves	PDT	80,862
Aluízio dos Santos Júnior	PV	95,412
Washington Reis de Oliveira	PMDB	138,811
Adrian Mussi Ramos	PMDB	72,824
Romário de Souza Faria	PSB	146,859
Vitor Paulo Araújo dos Santos	PRB	157,580
Hugo Leal Melo da Silva	PSC	98,164
Neilton Mulim da Costa	PR	41,480
Otavio Santos Silva Leite	PSDB	84,452
Liliam Sá de Paula	PR	29,248
Paulo César da Guia Almeida	PSD	33,856
Anthony Willian Garotinho Matheus de Oliveira	PR	694,862
Walney da Rocha Carvalho	PTB	51,203
Francisco Floriano de Sousa Silva	PR	57,018
Júlio Luiz Baptista Lopes	PP	85,358
Eduardo Cosentino da Cunha	PMDB	150,616
Luiz Sérgio Nóbrega de Oliveira	PT	85,660
Jandira Feghali	PCdoB	146,260
Sérgio Zveiter	PSD	65,826
Jair Messias Bolsonaro	PP	120,646
Edson Santos	PT	52,123
Alexandre José dos Santos	PMDB	72,822
Stepan Nercessian	PPS	84,006
Jorge de Oliveira	PR	44,355
Alexandre Aguiar Cardoso	PSB	142,714
Alfredo Hélio Syrkis	PV	73,185
Francisco Rodrigues de Alencar Filho	PSOL	240,724
Jorge Ricardo Bittar	PT	51,933
Edson Ezequiel de Matos	PMDB	72,589
Miro Teixeira	PDT	63,119
Benedita Souza da Silva Sampaio	PT	71,036
Adilson Soares	PR	51,011
Simão Sessim	PP	77,800

== Rio Grande do Norte ==
Name	Party	Individual votes
Fábio Salustino Mesquita de Faria	PSD	156,688
Felipe Catalão Maia	DEM	137,494
Paulo Wagner Leite Dantas	PV	55,086
Maria de Fátima Bezerra	PT	220,355
João da Silva Maia	PR	217,854
Sandra Maria da Escóssia Rosado	PSB	92,746
Henrique Eduardo Lyra Alves	PMDB	191,110
Carlos Alberto de Sousa Rosado	DEM	109,627

== Rio Grande do Sul ==
Name	Party	Individual votes
Manuela Pinto Vieira d'Ávila	PCdoB	482,590
Jerônimo Pizzolotto Goergen	PP	85,094
Danrlei de Deus Hinterholz	PSD	173,787
Nelson Marchezan Júnior	PSDB	92,394
Maria do Rosário	PT	143,128
Paulo Roberto Severo Pimenta	PT	153,072
Marco Aurelio Spall Maia	PT	122,134
Dionilso Mateus Marcon	PT	100,553
Alexandre Rubio Roso	PSB	28,236
Alceu Moreira da Silva	PMDB	81,071
Assis Flávio da Silva Melo	PCdoB	47,141
José Otávio Germano	PP	110,788
Afonso Hamm	PP	98,419
Elvino José Bohn Gass	PT	90,096
Luiz Roberto de Albuquerque	PSB	200,476
Carlos Eduardo Vieira da Cunha	PDT	76,818
Renato Delmar Molling	PP	104,175
Giovani Cherini	PDT	111,373
Henrique Fontana Júnior	PT	131,510
Sérgio Ivan Moraes	PTB	97,752
Gilberto José Spier Vargas	PT	120,707
Enio Egon Bergmann Bacci	PDT	92,116
José Luiz Stedile	PSB	41,401
Vilson Luiz Covatti	PP	125,051
Ronaldo Miro Zulke	PT	100,082
Onyx Dornelles Lorenzoni	DEM	84,696
Jorge Alberto Portanova Mendes Ribeiro Filho	PMDB	109,775
Osmar Gasparini Terra	PMDB	130,669
Luis Carlos Heinze	PP	180,403
Luiz Carlos Ghiorzzi Busato	PTB	85,832
Darcisio Paulo Perondi	PMDB	112,214

== Rondônia ==
Name	Party	Individual votes
Lindomar Barbosa Alves	PV	34,990
Mariton Benedito de Holanda	PT	31,128
Natan Donadon	PMDB	43,627
Marinha Célia Rocha Raupp de Matos	PMDB	100,589
Nilton Balbino	PTB	52,017
Mauro Nazif Rasul	PSB	64,792
Carlos Magno Ramos	PP	49,596
Rubens Moreira Mendes Filho	PSD	35,869

== Roraima ==
Name	Party	Individual votes
Johnathan Pereira de Jesus	PRB	16,550
Raul da Silva Lima Sobrinho	PSD	8,357
Herbson Jairo Ribeiro Bantim	PSDB	10,111
Maria Teresa Saenz Surita Jucá	PMDB	29,804
Paulo César Justo Quartiero	DEM	19,145
Edio Vieira Lopes	PMDB	15,383
Francisco Vieira Sampaio	PRP	5,903
Luciano de Souza Castro	PR	12,170

== Santa Catarina ==
Name	Party	Individual votes
João Rodrigues	PSD	134,558
Pedro Francisco Uczai	PT	114,985
Mauro Mariani	PMDB	186,733
Paulo Roberto Barreto Bornhausen	PSD	143,976
Décio Lima	PT	117,618
Marco Antônio Tebaldi	PSDB	100,839
Ronaldo José Benedet	PMDB	87,219
Jorginho dos Santos Mello	PSDB	119,757
Jorge Catarino Leonardeli Boeira	PT	84,210
Luci Teresinha Koswoski Choinacki	PT	65,545
Celso Maldaner	PMDB	93,455
Rogério Mendonça	PMDB	110,170
Edson Bez de Oliveira	PMDB	99,613
Esperidião Amin Helou Filho	PP	166,524
Odacir Zonta	PP	103,965
Onofre Santo Agostini	PSD	90,691

== São Paulo ==
Name	Party	Individual votes
Alexandre Leite da Silva	DEM	112,950
Bruna Dias Furlan	PSDB	270,661
Guilherme Mussi Ferreira	PSD	98,702
Luiz Fernando Arantes Machado	PSDB	129,620
Adriano Eli Corrêa	DEM	124,608
Rodrigo Garcia	DEM	226,073
Aline Lemos Corrêa de Oliveira Andrade	PP	78,317
Marcelo Theodoro de Aguiar	PSD	98,842
Marco Antônio Feliciano (Pastor)	PSC	211,855
Gabriel Benedito Issaac Chalita	PSB	560,022
Otoniel Carlos de Lima	PRB	95,971
Ricardo Izar Júnior	PV	87,347
Antônio Carlos Martins de Bulhões	PRB	162,667
Mara Cristina Gabrilli	PSDB	160,138
Roberto Alves de Lucena	PV	70,611
Jonas Donizette Ferreira	PSB	162,144
Jilmar Augustinho Tatto	PT	250,467
Francisco Everardo Oliveira Silva (Tiririca)	PR	1,353,820
Jefferson Alves de Campos	PSB	116,317
Antônio Duarte Nogueira Júnior	PSDB	124,737
Márcio Luiz França Gomes	PSB	172,005
Carlos Henrique Focesi Sampaio	PSDB	145,585
Carlos José de Almeida	PT	134,190
Guilherme Campos Júnior	PSD	112,852
Luiz Paulo Teixeira Ferreira	PT	134,479
Milton Monti	PR	131,654
Ricardo José Ribeiro Berzoini	PT	140,525
Carlos Alberto Rolim Zarattini	PT	216,403
Protógenes Pinheiro de Queiroz	PCdoB	94,906
Vicente Cândido da Silva	PT	160,242
João Paulo Cunha	PT	255,497
José Roberto Santiago Gomes	PV	60,180
Edson Aparecido dos Santos	PSDB	184,403
José de Filippi Júnior	PT	149,525
Paulo Pereira da Silva	PDT	267,208
José Olímpio Silveira Moraes	PP	160,813
Vanderlei Siraque	PT	91,415
Vicente Paulo da Silva	PT	141,068
Emanuel Fernandes	PSDB	218,789
Iolanda Keiko Miashiro Ota	PSB	213,024
Júlio Fracisco Semeghini Neto	PSDB	113,333
Paulo Roberto Freire da Costa	PR	161,083
Arnaldo Calil Pereira Jardim	PPS	140,641
Salvador Zimbaldi Filho	PDT	42,743
Cândido Elpídio de Souza Vaccarezza	PT	131,685
Dimas Eduardo Ramalho	PPS	139,636
Jorge Tadeu Mudalen	DEM	164,650
João Eduardo Dado Leite de Carvalho	PDT	70,486
Newton Lima Neto	PT	110,207
José Ricardo Alvarenga Tripoli	PSDB	134,884
José Carlos Vaz de Lima	PSDB	170,777
José Abelardo Guimarães Camarinha	PSB	71,637
Paulo Roberto Gomes Mansur	PP	65,397
Edson Edinho Coelho Araújo	PMDB	100,195
Arlindo Chinaglia Júnior	PT	207,465
Valdemar Costa Neto	PR	174,826
José Mentor Guilherme de Mello Netto	PT	139,691
José Aníbal Peres de Pontes	PSDB	170,957
Ivan Valente	PSOL	189,014
Antônio Carlos de Mendes Thame	PSDB	139,727
William Dib	PSDB	113,823
Janete Rocha Pietá	PT	144,529
José Luiz de França Penna	PV	78,301
Arnaldo Fária de Sá	PTB	192,336
Devanir Ribeiro	PT	127,952
Roberto João Pereira Freire	PPS	121,471
Nelson Marquezelli	PTB	117,634
Junji Abe	PSD	113,156
Luiza Erundina de Sousa	PSB	214,114
Paulo Salim Maluf	PP	497,203

== Sergipe ==
Name	Party	Individual votes
Antônio Carlos Valadares Filho	PSB	95,680
André Luís Dantas Ferreira	PSC	83,641
Márcio Costa Macedo	PT	58,782
Rogério Carvalho Santos	PT	116,417
José Heleno da Silva	PRB	61,598
José de Araújo Mendonça Sobrinho	DEM	89,641
Laercio José de Oliveira	PR	79,514
José Almeida Lima	PMDB	75,082

== Tocantins ==
Name	Party	Individual votes
Irajá Silvestre Filho	PSD	39,301
Carlos Eduardo Torres Gomes	PSDB	49,455
Raimundo Coimbra Júnior	PMDB	69,372
Maria Auxiliadora Seabra Rezende	DEM	38,233
Laurez da Rocha Moreira	PSB	39,658
Joséli Ângelo Agnolin	PDT	47,542
César Hanna Halum	PSD	39,827
Lázaro Botelho Martins	PP	41,888

Preceded by 53rd	54th Chamber of Deputies of Brazil; February 1, 2011	Succeeded by 55th
