= Waldenor Pereira =

Brazilian politician

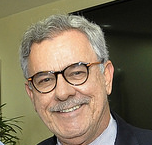
- Pereira in September 2015

Federal Deputy for Bahia
- Incumbent
- Assumed office 1 February 2011

State Deputy for Bahia
- In office 1 February 2003 – 31 December 2010

Rector of State University of Southwestern Bahia
- In office 1994–2002

Personal details
- Born: 8 March 1954 (age 71) Caculé, Bahia, Brazil
- Party: PT

Waldenor Alves Pereira Filho (born 8 March 1954) more commonly known as Waldenor Pereira is a Brazilian politician as well as an economists and university professor. He has spent his political career representing his home state of Bahia, having served as state representative since 2011.

== Personal life ==
He is the son of Waldenor Alves Pereira and Terezinha Ledo Alves Pereira. He holds a postgraduate degree in programming and public budget from the Federal University of Bahia. He also holds a diploma in advanced studies in Public Management from the Complutense University of Madrid. Before becoming a politician Pereira worked as an economists and university professor. From 1994 to 2002 he was the rector of the State University of Southwestern Bahia.

== Political career ==
Pereira voted against the impeachment motion of then-president Dilma Rousseff. Pereira voted against the 2017 Brazilian labor reform, and would vote in favor of a corruption investigation into Rousseff's successor Michel Temer.
