= Diego Andrade =

Diego Andrade may refer to:

- Diego Andrade Silva Bispo (born 1989), Brazilian footballer
- Diego Andrade (footballer) (born 1992), Mexican footballer
- Diego Andrade (politician) (born 1977), Brazilian politician
