= Francisco Eurico da Silva =

Brazilian politician

Eurico da Silva
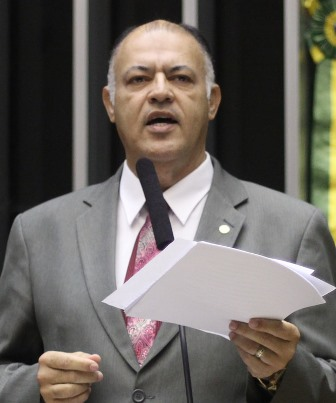
- Eurico da Silva in September 2015

Federal Deputy for Pernambuco
- Incumbent
- Assumed office 1 January 2011

Personal details
- Born: 12 September 1962 (age 64) Presidente Prudente, São Paulo, Brazil
- Party: PSDB (Since 2026)
- Other political affiliations: PSB (2010-2016); PHS (2016-2018); PATRI (2018–2022); PL (2022-2026)

Francisco Eurico da Silva (born 12 September 1962) more commonly known as Pastor Eurico is a Brazilian politician and pastor. Although born in São Paulo, he has spent his political career representing Pernambuco, having served as federal deputy representative since 2011.

== Personal life ==
Silva was born to João Eurico da Silva and Djanira Soares da Silva. He is a pastor of the Assembleias de Deus church.

== Political career ==
Silva was the author of a bill known in Brazil as "Gay Cure", which allows treatments aimed at reversing homosexuality. The bill, which had already been presented by other parliamentarians and was widely criticized during the 2013 protests in Brazil, amends resolutions of the Brazilian Federal Council of Psychology that prohibit psychologists from considering homosexuality a disease or that try to reverse sexual orientation. However, after the request of his party, Silva withdrew the draft bill and asked for its filing.

Silva voted in favor of the impeachment against then-president Dilma Rousseff and political reformation. He would later back Rousseff's successor Michel Temer against a similar impeachment motion, and also voted in favor of the Brazil labor reform (2017). He joined the Patriot party in 2018.

== Feud with Xuxa ==
Silva had a well publicised spat with Brazilian television personality Xuxa. The latter, who is affectionately known in Brazil as "Queen of Little Children" for her television programs aimed at kids, was rebuked by Silva in a public hearing about a bill to ban child corporal punishment in the home by parents and adult guardians. The congressman said that Xuxa's presence in the Chamber of Deputies would be an affront to children because Xuxa was part of the cast of the 1980 film Love Strange Love, in which the character played by Xuxa has sexual relations with a 12-year-old boy.
