= Paulo Freire Costa =

Brazilian politician (born 1955)

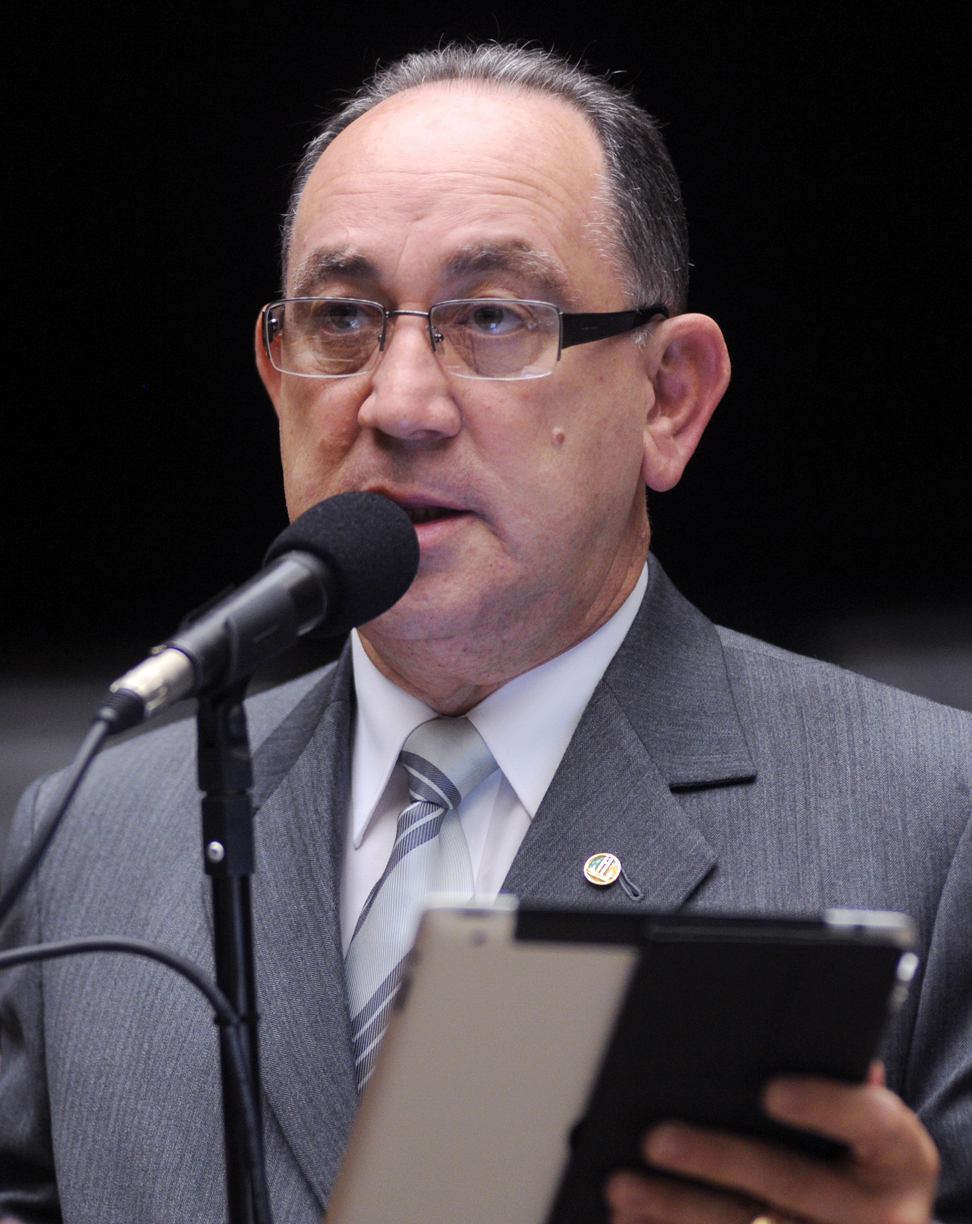
- Freire in December 2011

Member of the Chamber of Deputies
- Incumbent
- Assumed office 1 February 2011
- Constituency: São Paulo

Personal details
- Born: Paulo Roberto Freire da Costa; 4 February 1955 (age 71) São Paulo, Brazil
- Party: PL (2009–present)
- Other political affiliations: PTB (2002–2006); DEM (2006–20099)
- Profession: Evangelical pastor

Religious life
- Religion: Christian
- Denomination: Neopentecostal
- Church: Assembly of God

Paulo Roberto Freire da Costa (born 4 February 1955) is a Brazilian politician and pastor. He has spent his political career representing São Paulo, having served as state representative since 2011.

== Personal life ==
Freire Costa was born to José Wellington Bezerra da Costa and Vanda Freire Costa. His father José was a pastor of the Assembleias de Deus church. He has 5 siblings: José Wellington, Samuel, Joel, Marta, and Rute. His sister Marta is also a politician, and his brother José Wellington is also a pastor. Freire Costa is married to Léa Costa and has two daughters: Vanessa and Cristiane, as well as three grandchildren. Like his father and brother he is also a pastor in the Assembleias de Deus church. Because of his faith Freire Costa is strongly opposed to abortion.

== Political career ==
Freire Costa voted in favor of the impeachment against then-president Dilma Rousseff and political reformation. He would later vote in against opening a corruption investigation against Rousseff's successor Michel Temer, and voted in favor of the 2017 Brazilian labor reforms.
