= Jerônimo Goergen =

Brazilian politician

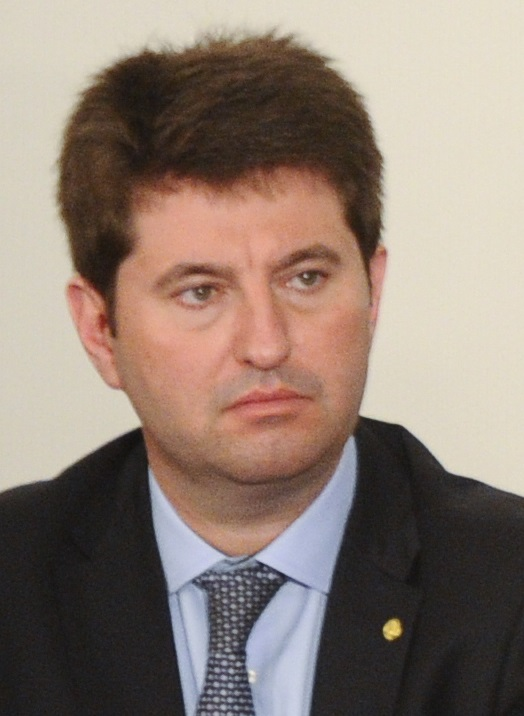
- Goergen in May 2017

Federal Deputy for Rio Grande do Sul
- Incumbent
- Assumed office 1 February 2011

State Deputy for Rio Grande do Sul
- In office 1 February 2003 – 31 January 2011

Personal details
- Born: 20 January 1976 (age 50) Palmeira das Missões, RS, Brazil
- Party: PP

Jerônimo Pizzolotto Goergen (born 20 January 1976) is a Brazilian politician and lawyer. He has spent his political career representing his home state of Rio Grande do Sul, having served as state representative since 2011.

== Personal life ==
Goergen is the son of Gilberto Elias Goergen and Clelia Regina Pizzolotto. In his youth Goergen joined the Juventude Progressista Gaúcha (JPG), the youth wing of the Progressistas. As is common in his home state Goergen is of German and Italian descent. Before becoming a politician he worked as a lawyer.

== Political career ==
Goergen voted in favor of the impeachment of then-president Dilma Rousseff. He voted in favor of the 2017 Brazilian labor reform, and would vote in favor of a corruption investigation into Rousseff's successor Michel Temer.

Goergen is the institutional coordinator of the Parliamentary Front of Agriculture (FPA), a political forum that is compressed of more than 250 deputies in who lobby for the defense of agribusiness. He was the creator of the proposal that instituted the Stimulus Program for the Restructuring and Strengthening of Higher Education Institutions and was the author of the proposal that amended the Pelé Law, establishing rules of management and transparency in sport. He was the sub-rapporteur of the project creating the new Code of Civil Procedure (CPC). He is also the author of PL 4824/2012, which extends the rights of airmen, and the new Drivers Act, which regulates the workload of cargo carriers.
