= Valmir Assunção =

Brazilian politician

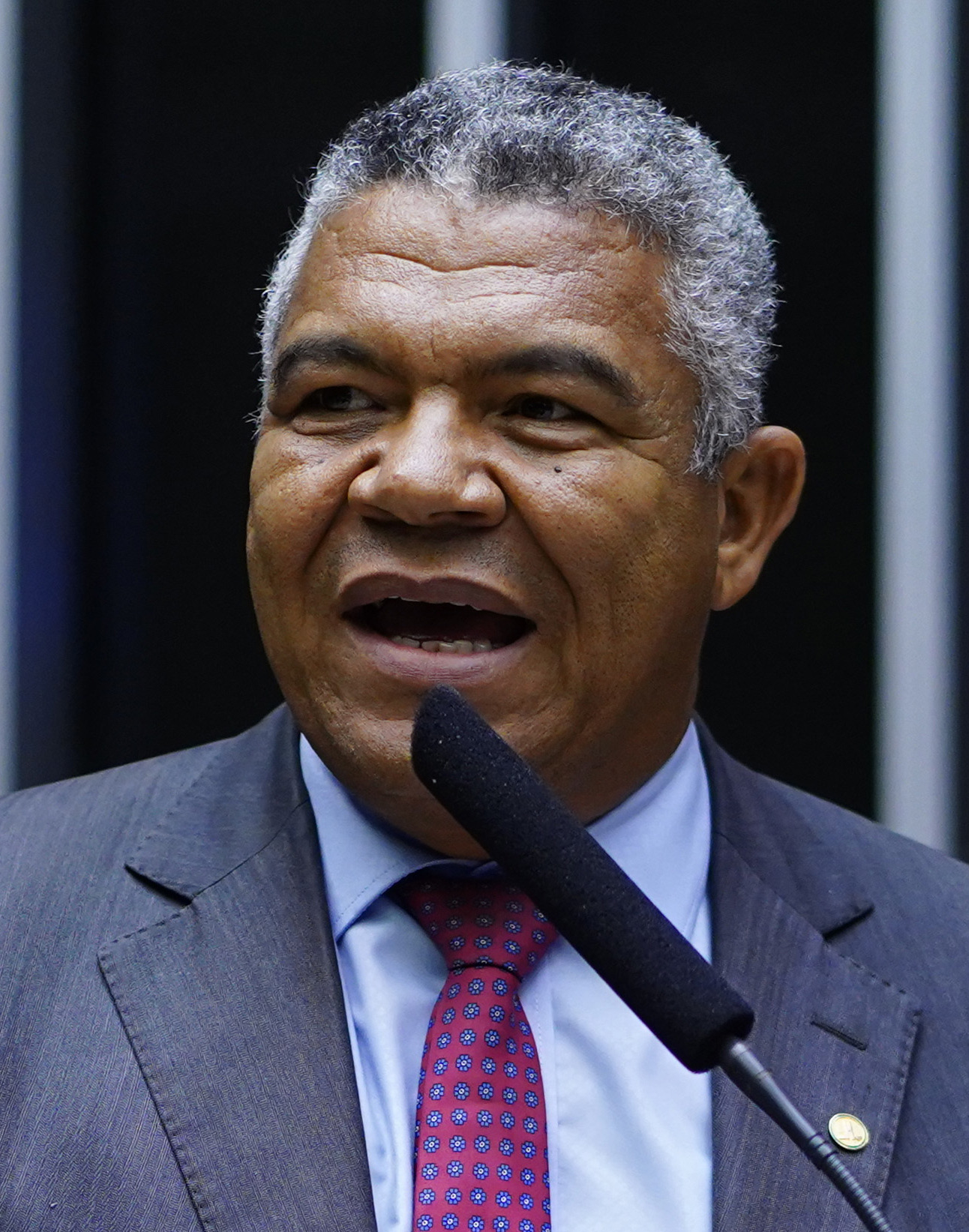

Member of the Chamber of Deputies
- Incumbent
- Assumed office 1 February 2011
- Constituency: Bahia

Member of the Legislative Assembly of Bahia
- In office 1 February 2005 – 1 February 2011
- Constituency: At-large

Personal details
- Born: Valmir Carlos da Assunção; 17 December 1964 (age 61) Itamaraju, Bahia, Brazil
- Party: PT (since 1989)

Valmir Carlos da Assunção (born 17 December 1964) more commonly known as Valmir Assunção is a Brazilian politician and farmer. He has spent his political career representing his home state of Bahia, having served as state representative since 2011.

== Personal life ==
He is the child of Ionério Carlos da Assunção and Rosa Francisco Dias Assunção. Assunção is married to Fabya Reis. Before becoming a politician Assunção worked as an agriculturalists. He has been affiliated with the Landless Workers' Movement since 1990.

== Political career ==
Assunção voted against the impeachment motion of then-president Dilma Rousseff. Assunção voted against the 2017 Brazilian labor reform, and would vote in favor of a corruption investigation into Rousseff's successor Michel Temer.

During the impeachment proceedings against Rousseff, Assunção got in a heated argument with Laerte Bessa about Eduardo Cunha's proposal of a secret ballot to see if the impeachment motion should proceed. Assunção and Bessa started shouting loudly at each other which quickly turned to pushing and shoving with soon escalated with other members of parliament involved. Assunção and Bessa were ultimately disciplined and not allowed to attend the rest of the hearing, although they were ultimately allowed to vote in proceeding.
