= Antonio Bulhões =

Brazilian politician and religious leader

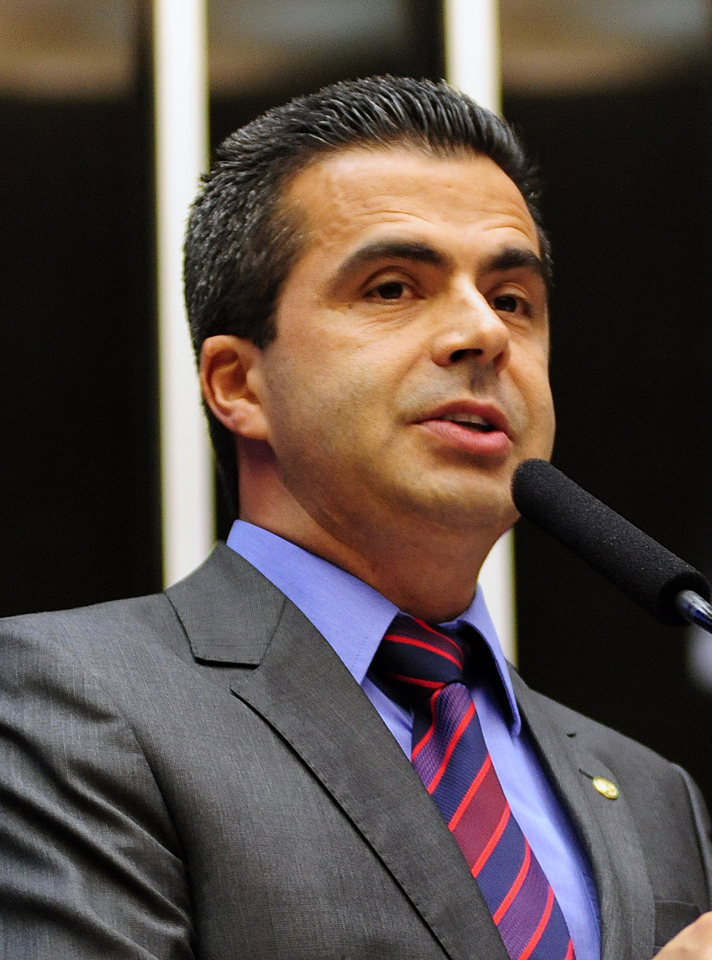
- Bulhões in 2012

Federal Deputy for São Paulo
- Incumbent
- Assumed office 1 February 2007

Personal details
- Born: 5 May 1968 (age 58) Rio de Janeiro, Brazil
- Party: PRB

Antonio Carlos Martins de Bulhões (born 5 May 1968) is a Brazilian politician and religious leader. Although born in Rio de Janeiro, he has spent his political career representing São Paulo, having served as state representative since 2007.

== Personal life ==
Bulhões is originally a lawyer, and is also a pastor and bishop of the neo-Pentecostal movement the Universal Church of the Kingdom of God. Bulhões has also been a presenter for the television shows Fala que Eu Te Escuto (Speak I love you) on RecordTV and Retrato de Família (Family Portrait) on Record News.

== Political career ==
Between 7 February 2012 and 1 February 2013, Bulhões was the leader of the Brazilian Republican Party or (PRB) in the legislative house.

Bulhões voted in favor of the impeachment against then-president Dilma Rousseff. Bulhões voted in favor of the Brazil labor reform (2017), and would later back Rousseff's successor Michel Temer against a similar impeachment motion.
