= Edmar Arruda =

Brazilian politician

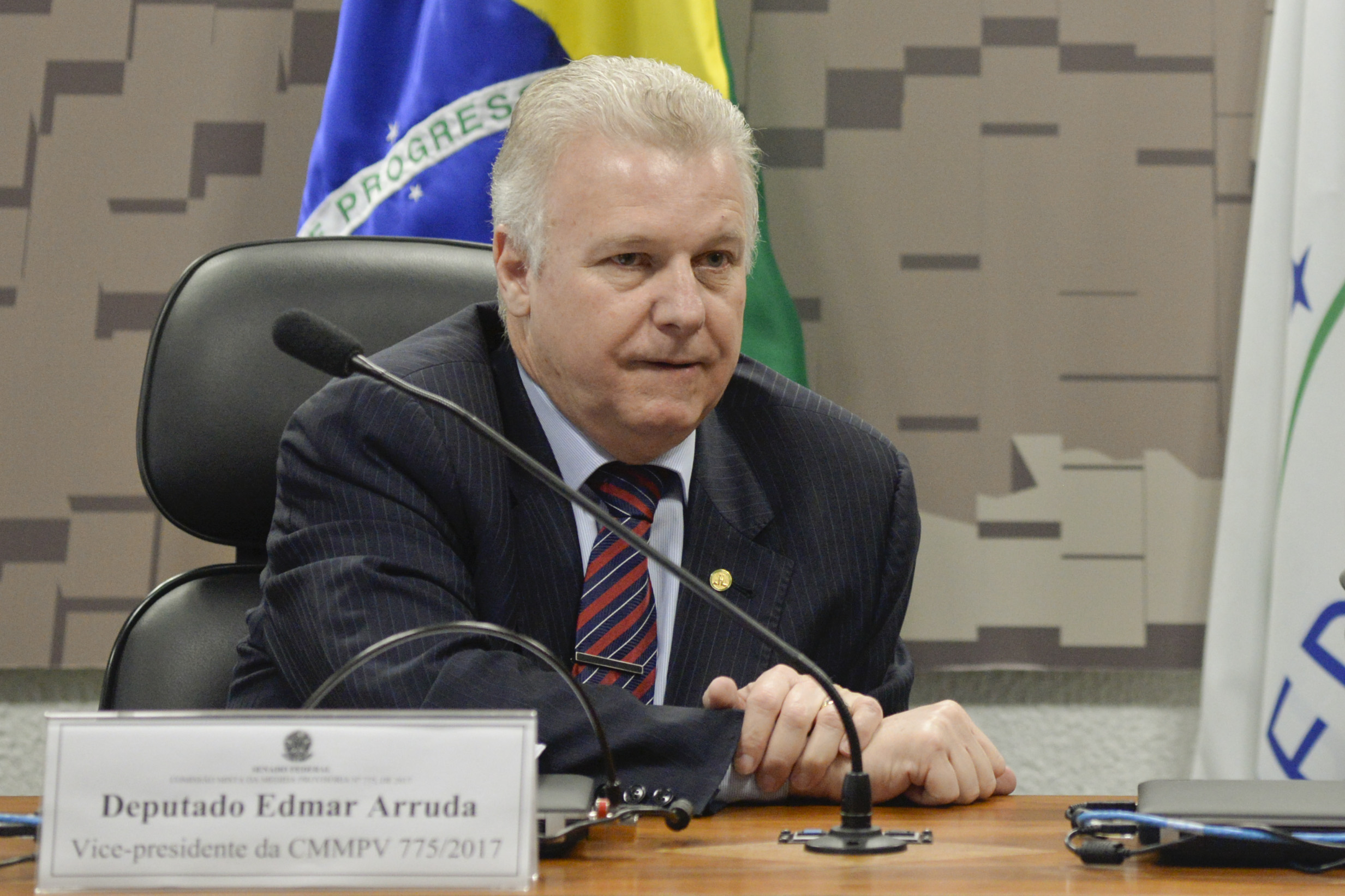
- Arruda in June 2017

Federal Deputy for Paraná
- In office 1 February 2011 – 31 January 2019

Mayor of Maringá
- In office 1 January 2001 – 31 December 2004

Personal details
- Born: 26 September 1959 (age 67) Tuneiras do Oeste, Paraná, Brazil
- Party: PSD (2016–); PSC (2010–2016)

Edmar de Souza Arruda (born 26 September 1959) is a Brazilian politician and economist. He has spent his political career representing Paraná, having served as mayor of Maringá from 2001 to 2004 and as federal deputy representative from 2011 to 2019.

== Personal life ==
Arruda is the son of Antonio Arruda de Souza and Alice da Silva de Souza. He is married to Silvana Pazzetto and is a member of the Independent Presbyterian Church of Brazil.

At the age of 15 Arruda moved to Maringá to work and study. He graduated with a degree in economics from the State University of Maringá, as well as having a degree in business management from Fundação Getúlio Vargas. Prior to becoming a politician, Arruda worked as an economists.

== Political career ==
Arruda was elected to the federal chamber of deputies under banner of the Social Christian Party (Brazil) in the 2010 Brazilian general elections. In 2016 he joined the Social Democratic Party.

Arruda did not vote in the impeachment motion of then-president Dilma Rousseff. Arruda voted in favor of tax reform spending and the 2017 Brazilian labor reform, and voted against opening a corruption investigation against Rousseff's successor Michel Temer.
