= Lázaro Botelho =

Brazilian politician and businessman (born 1947)

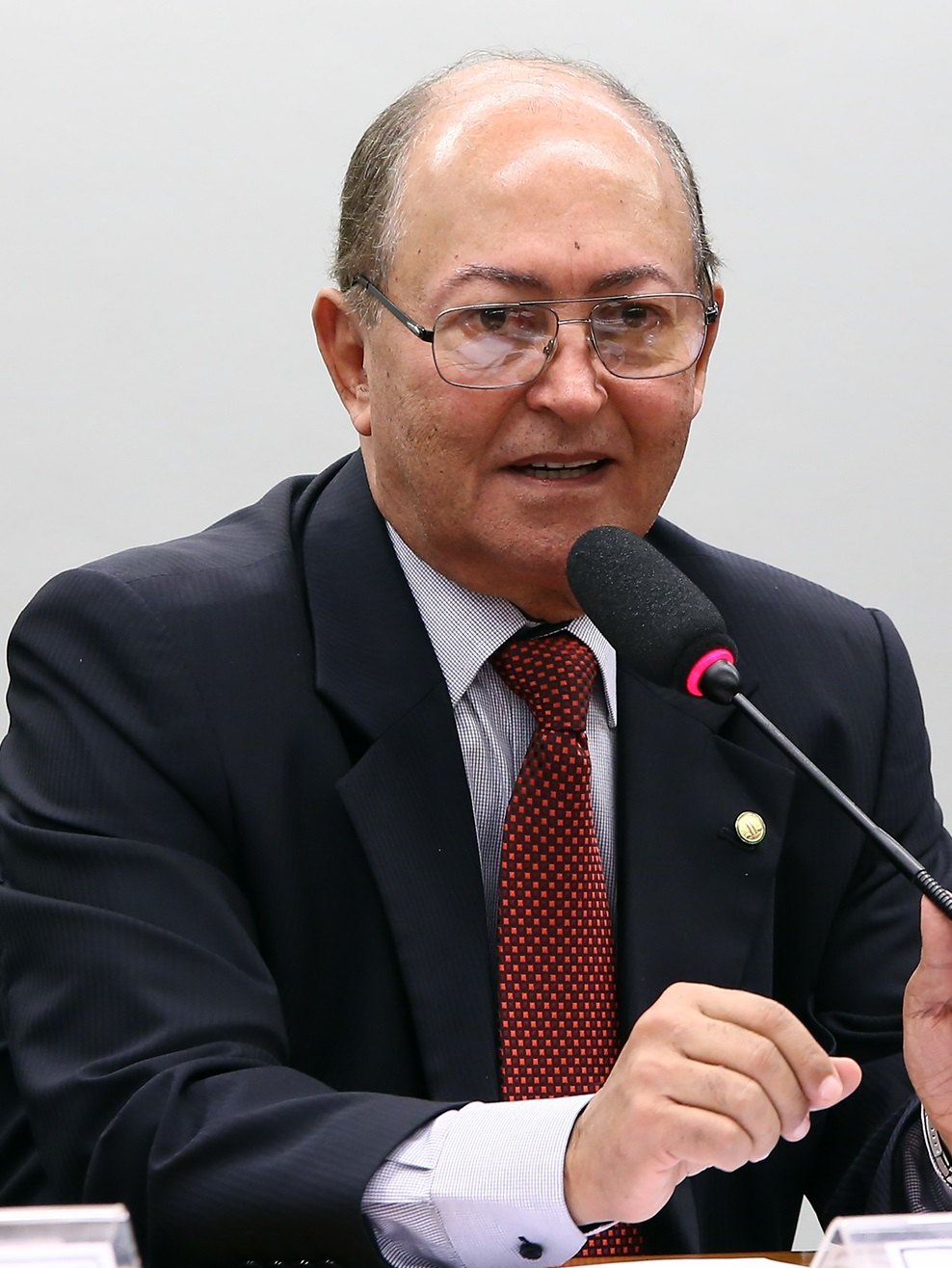
- Botelho in December 2016

Federal Deputy for Tocantins
- In office 1 February 2015 – 31 January 2019

Personal details
- Born: 11 February 1947 (age 78) Loreto, Maranhão, Brazil
- Political party: PP

Lázaro Botelho Martins (born 11 February 1947) is a Brazilian politician and businessman. Although born in Maranhão, he has spent his political career representing Tocantins, having served as state representative from 2007 to 2019.

== Personal life ==
Botelho was born to Joel Martins dos Reis and Luzia Botelho Martins Reis. Before entering politics Botelho worked as a businessman in trading in the stock market.

== Political career ==
Botelho voted in favor of the impeachment of then-president Dilma Rousseff. Botelho voted in favor of the 2017 Brazilian labor reform, and would vote against a corruption investigation into Rousseff's successor Michel Temer.

Botelho was investigated during Operation Car Wash for allegedly taking bribes from Petrobras, although the investigative committee ultimately decided there was not enough evidence to prosecute and Botelho was eventually declared innocent.
