= Jorge Tadeu Mudalen =

Brazilian politician (born 1955)

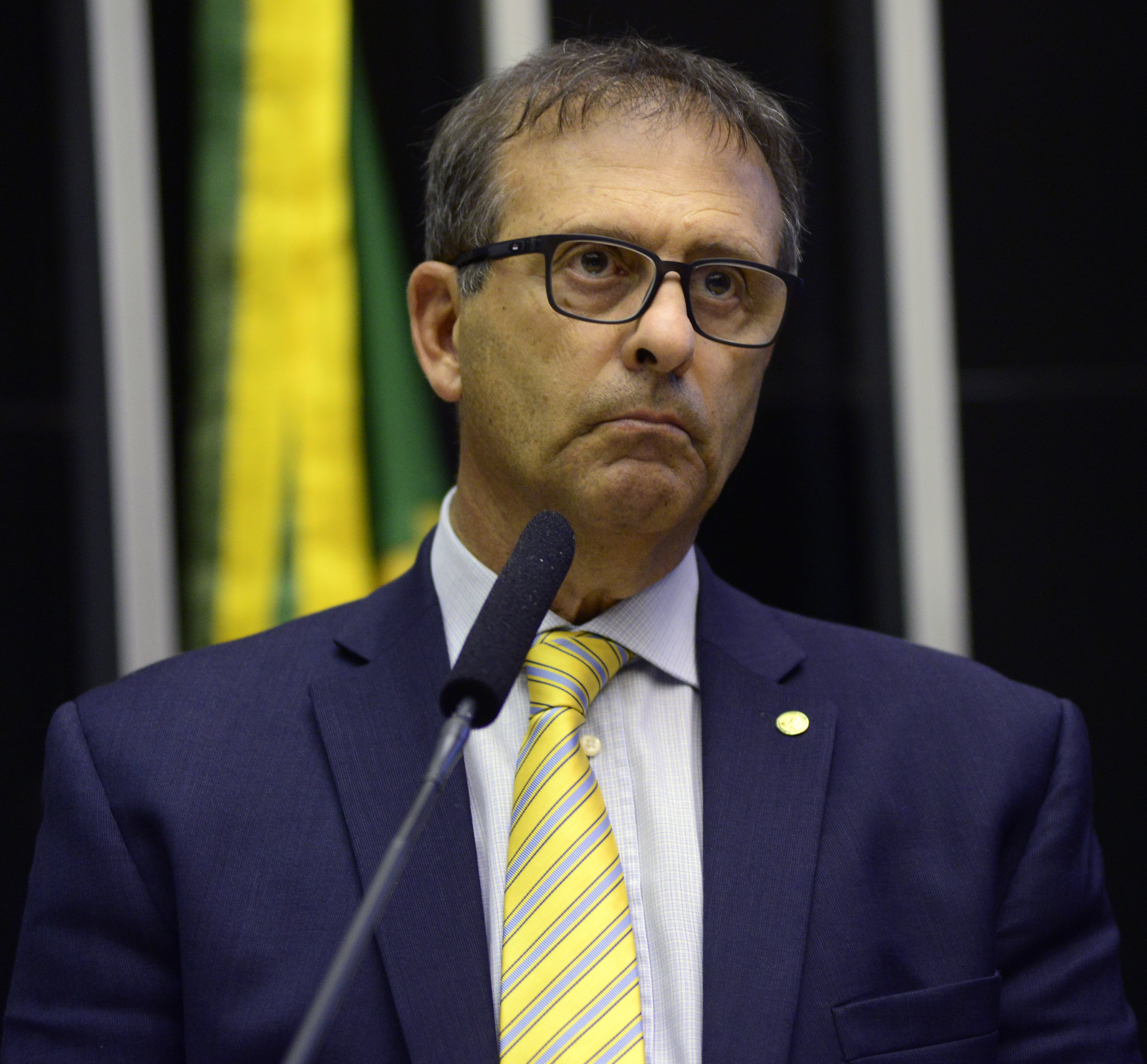
- Mudalen in September 2015

Federal Deputy for São Paulo
- In office 1 February 2003 – 31 January 2019

Personal details
- Born: 3 January 1955 (age 71) Guarulhos, Brazil
- Party: DEM (2007–); PFL (2005–2007); PMDB (1999–2005); PP (1995–1999); PMDB (1980–1995)

Jorge Tadeu Mudalen (born 3 January 1955) is a Brazilian politician. He has spent his political career representing São Paulo, having served as federal deputy representative from 2003 to 2019.

== Personal life ==
Mudalen is the son of Elias Mudalen and Farida Mudalen. Mudalen is a member of the neo-Pentecostal church Igreja Internacional da Graça de Deus.

== Political career ==
Mudalen voted in favor of the impeachment motion of then-president Dilma Rousseff. Mudalen voted in favor of the 2017 Brazilian labor reform, and would vote against opening a corruption investigation into Rousseff's successor Michel Temer.

Mudalen caused some controversy in Brazil when he and several other evangelical politicians proposed a bill that would classify abortion as homicide.
