= Josué Bengtson =

Brazilian politician

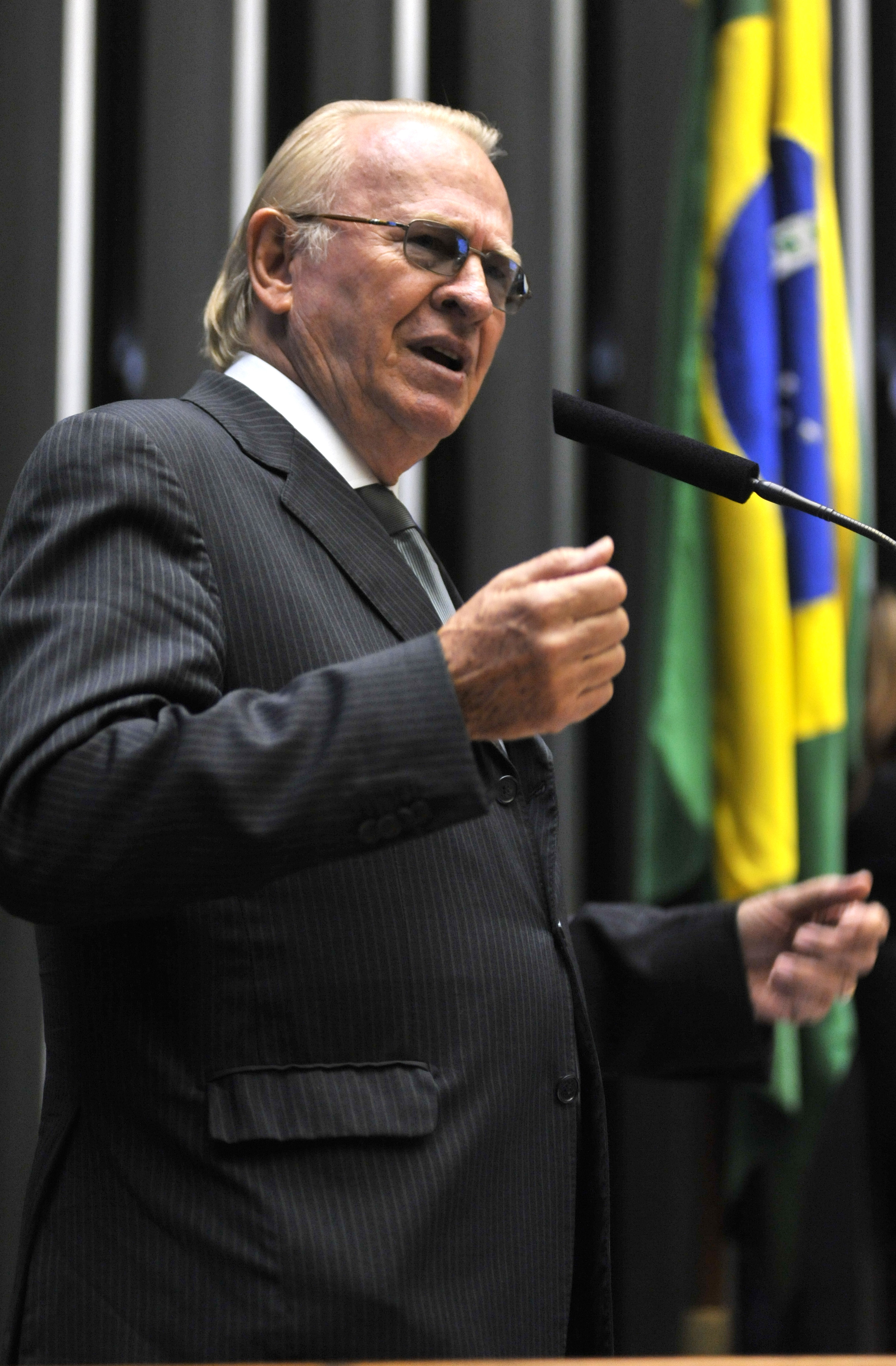
- Bengtson in 2011

Federal Deputy for Pará
- In office 1 February 1999 – 31 January 2007

Federal Deputy for Pará
- Incumbent
- Assumed office 1 February 2011

Personal details
- Born: 27 May 1944 (age 80); Getulina, São Paulo, Brazil
- Political party: PTB

Josué Bengtson (born 27 May 1944) is a Brazilian politician and pastor. Although born in São Paulo, he has spent his political career representing Pará, having served as state representative since 1999. He is also the pastor and head of the Brazilian division of the International Church of the Foursquare Gospel.

== Personal life ==
Bengtson was born in a family of distant Scottish descent to João André Bengtson and Elza Luiza Bengtson. He was raised Presbyterian. In 1955 he began listening to evangelical podcast on the radio and his family began attending the newly founded Foursquare Gospel Church in his community. It was not until 28 January 1961 that Bengtson formally converted and joined the church following the lead of his sister Anna who had joined the church a few years before. Almost immediately after being baptized, Bengtson became a missionary and pastor, traveling Brazil to establish other Foursquare Gospel Churches, including in the states of Mato Grosso do Sul, Bahia, Santa Catarina and Pará where he ended up moving to. He is the current leader of the Brazilian division of the Foursquare Gospel Church and is the pastor of igreja da Pedreira in Belém.

Bengtson is married to Marilene Maestri Bengtson with whom he has 4 children.

== Political career ==
Bengtson voted in favor of the impeachment against then-president Dilma Rousseff. Bengtson voted in favor of the Brazil labor reform (2017), and would later back Rousseff's successor Michel Temer against an investigation looking into possible corruption.

In May 2018 a court in Belém found Bengtson guilty of diverting funds for the state health department for his church and personal usage. As a result, Bengtson was banned from running for political office in the state of Pará for 8 years.
