= Eli Corrêa Filho =

Brazilian politician (born 1976)

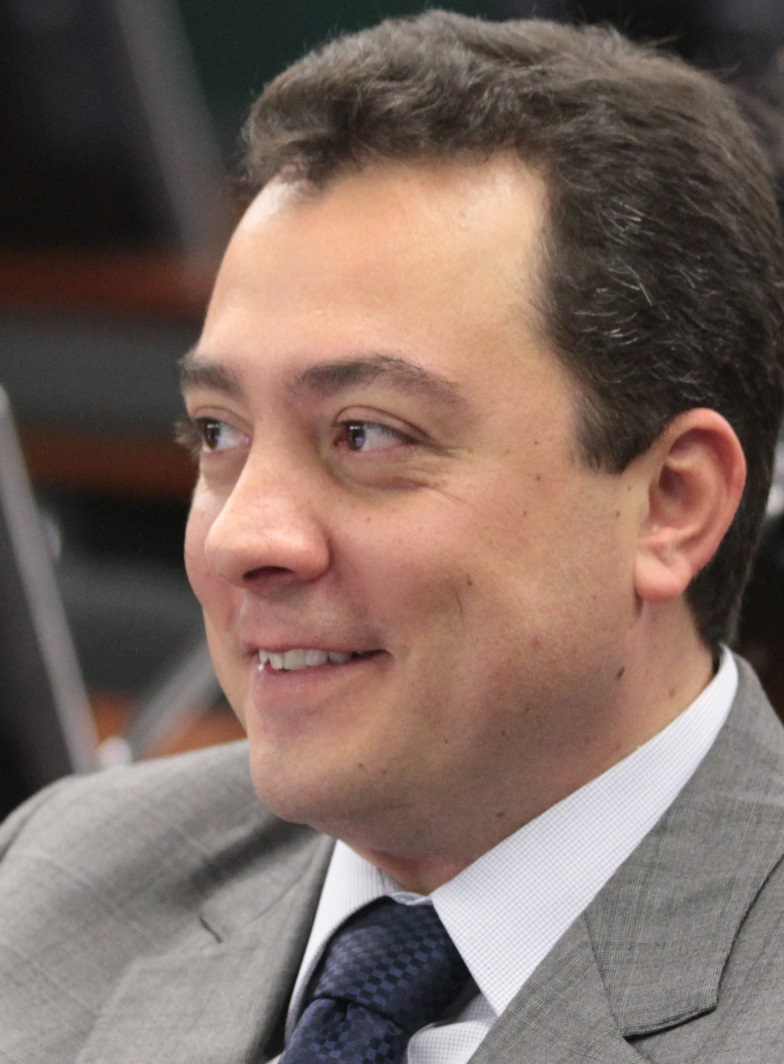
- Corrêa in July 2012

Federal Deputy for São Paulo
- Incumbent
- Assumed office 1 February 2011

State Deputy for São Paulo
- In office 1 February 1999 – 31 January 2003

Personal details
- Born: 13 January 1976 (age 50) São Paulo, Brazil
- Party: UNIÃO (2022–present)
- Other political affiliations: DEM (1995–2022)

Adriano Eli Corrêa (born 13 January 1976) more commonly known as Eli Corrêa Filho is a Brazilian politician and radio personality. He has spent his political career representing São Paulo, having served as federal deputy representative since 2011.

== Personal life ==
Corrêa is the son of Antônio Eli Corrêa, better known as Eli Corrêa, a famed radio personality from Paraná, and Ana Maria Pacolo, a psychologist and lawyer. He is married Francislene Assis de Almeida Corrêa and has two daughter: Sophia e Luna. Corrêa himself has worked as a radio personality himself for several decades in his home city of São Paulo.

== Political career ==
Corrêa voted in favor of the impeachment against then-president Dilma Rousseff and political reformation. He would later vote in against opening a corruption investigation against Rousseff's successor Michel Temer, and voted in favor of the 2017 Brazilian labor reforms.
