= Darcísio Perondi =

Brazilian politician

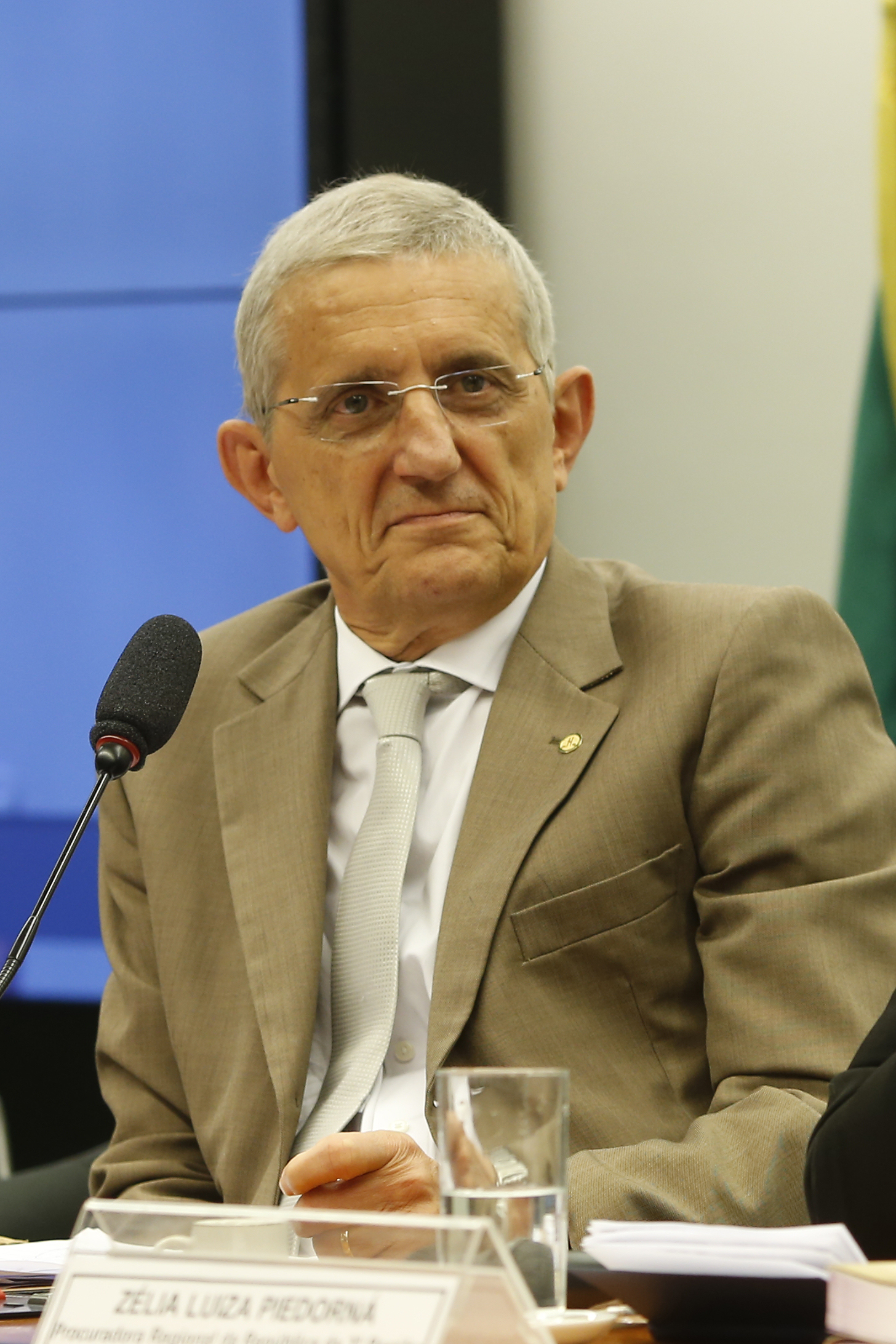
- Perondi in 2017

Federal Deputy for Rio Grande do Sul
- Incumbent
- Assumed office 1 February 2015

State Deputy of Rio Grande do Sul
- In office 1 February 1995 – 31 January 2011

Personal details
- Born: 2 April 1947 (age 79) Ijuí, Rio Grande do Sul, Brazil
- Party: MDB

Darcisio Paulo Perondi (born 2 April 1947) is a Brazilian politician and pediatrician. He has spent his political career representing Rio Grande do Sul, having served as federal deputy representative from 1995 to 2011 and from 2015.

== Personal life ==
Before entering politics in 1993 Perondi worked as a pediatrician at the local hospital in Ijuí.

== Political career ==
Perondi voted in favor of the impeachment against then-president Dilma Rousseff and political reformation. He would later vote in against opening a corruption investigation against Rousseff's successor Michel Temer, and voted in favor of the 2017 Brazilian labor reforms.

Perondi was initially not elected to the federal deputy in the 2018, but was chosen as Osmar Terra's successor in the legislature after the latter was appointed to president-elect Jair Bolsonaro's cabinet.
