= Bruna Furlan =

Brazilian politician

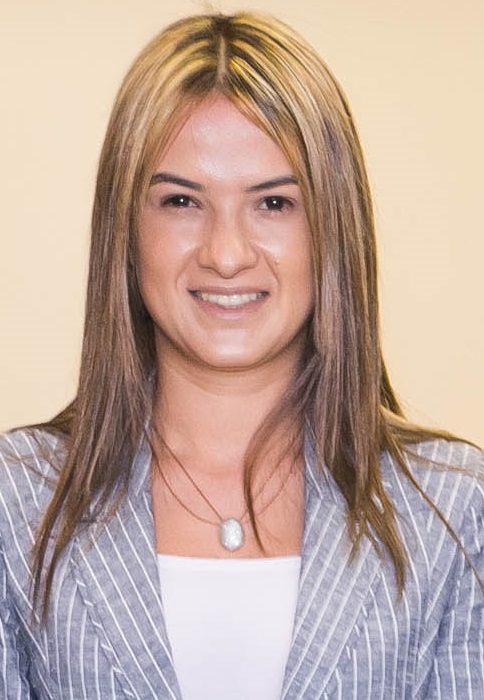
- Furlan in August 2015

Federal Deputy for the São Paulo
- Incumbent
- Assumed office 1 February 2011

Personal details
- Born: 28 April 1983 (age 43) Barueri, SP, Brazil
- Party: PSDB

Bruna Dias Furlan (born 28 April 1983) is a Brazilian politician and lawyer. She has spent her political career representing the São Paulo, having served as state representative since 2011.

== Personal life ==
Furlan was born to Rubens Furlan and Sonia Dias. Her father is also a politician. Before becoming a politician Furlan worked as a lawyer. Furland is a member of the Christian Congregation in Brazil Pentecostal church. Furlan holds a master's degree from the Universidade Paulista (UNIP), and has post-graduate degrees in city management from Fundação Armando Alvares Penteado and in executive leadership from Harvard University in the United States.

== Political career ==
At the age of 27, Furlan was the youngest representative elected in the 2010 Brazilian general election at the age of 27. Furlan was the vice-leader of the PSDB in the chamber of deputies from 2011 to 2016, and has been the leader if the party in the chamber since 2018.

Furlan voted for the impeachment motion of then-president Dilma Rousseff. Furlan voted in favor of the 2017 Brazilian labor reform, and she would vote against a corruption investigation into Rousseff's successor Michel Temer.
