= César Halum =

Brazilian politician

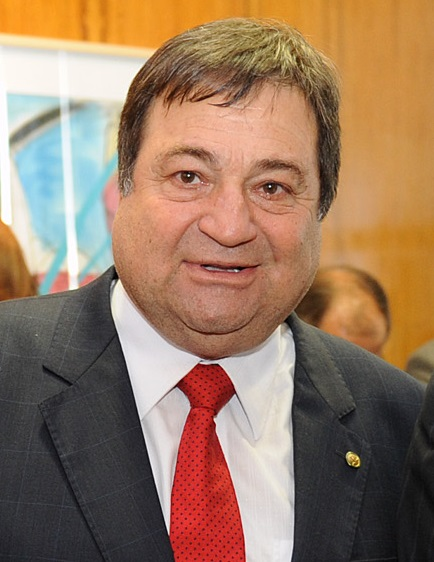
- Halum in April 2014

Secretary of Agriculture, Livestock and Aquaculture for Tocantins
- Incumbent
- Assumed office 1 February 2019

Federal Deputy for Tocantins
- In office 1 February 2011 – 31 January 2019

State Deputy for Tocantins
- In office 1 February 2003 – 31 December 2010

Mayor of Araguaína
- In office 1997–1998

Personal details
- Born: 10 March 1954 (age 72) Anápolis, Goiás, Brazil
- Party: PRB (2013–); PSD (2011–2013); PPS (2009–2011); DEM (2007–2009); PFL (1988–2007)

César Hanna Halum (born 10 March 1954) is a Brazilian politician as well as a lawyer. Although born in Goiás, he has spent his political career representing the state of Tocantins, having served as state representative from 2011 to 2019.

== Personal life ==
Halum is the son of Geny Elias Halum and Nahim Hanna Halum. He is an alumnus of the Federal University of Goiás. Halum is married to Grácia Maria Teixeira with whom he has three children: Flávia, Fernanda and César Henrique. Before becoming a politician he worked as a veterinarian.

== Political career ==
Halum voted in favor of the impeachment of then-president Dilma Rousseff. He voted in favor of the 2017 Brazilian labor reform, and would vote in favor of a corruption investigation into Rousseff's successor Michel Temer.

After failing to be reelected to a third term in the chamber of deputies in the 2018 election, Halum was appointed the secretary of agriculture, livestock and aquaculture for the state of Tocantins. In March 2019, Halum represented Tocantins at an international conference in Lima, Peru, on sustainable agricultural production.
