= Rubens Otoni =

Brazilian politician

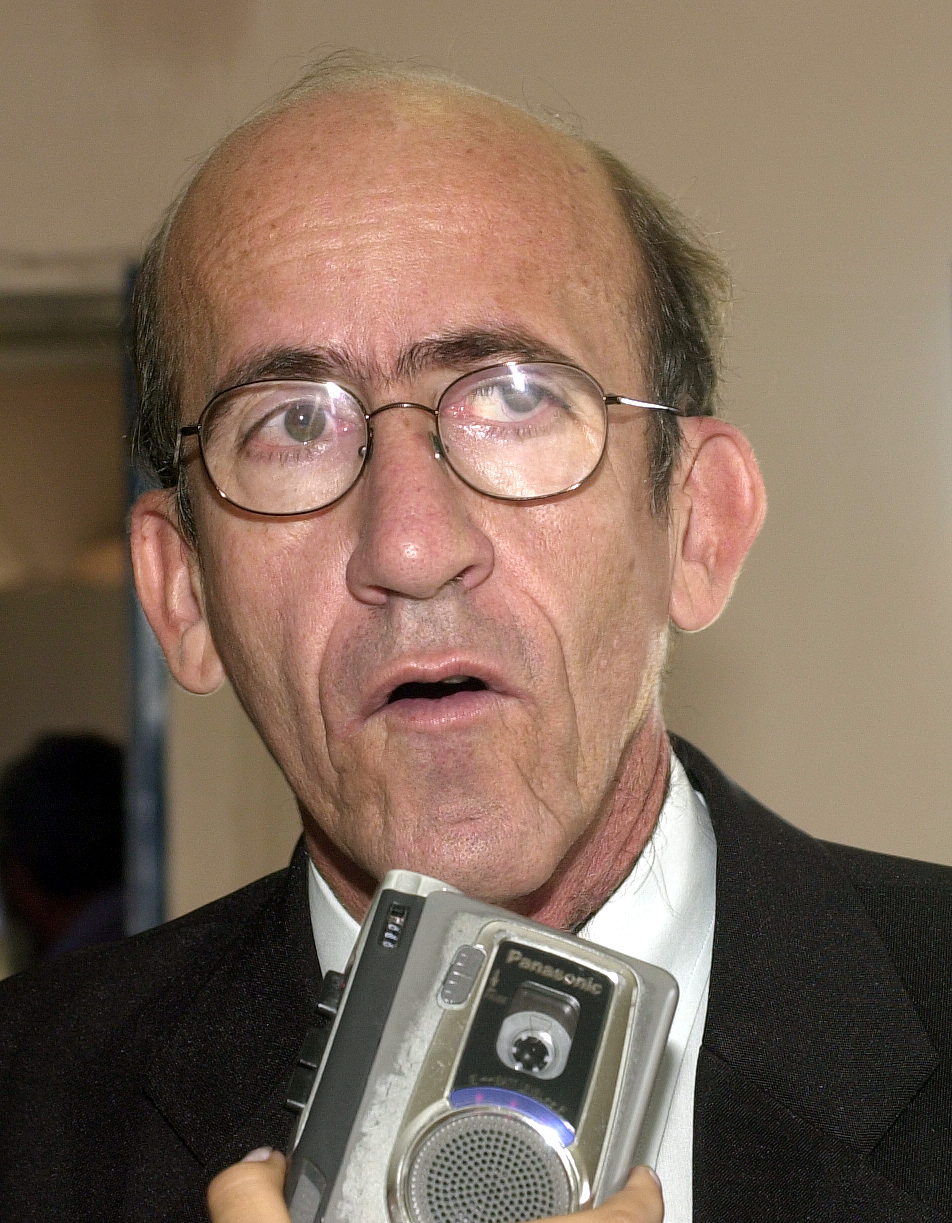
- Otoni in 2006

Member of the Chamber of Deputies
- Incumbent
- Assumed office 1 February 2003
- Constituency: Goiás

Personal details
- Born: Rubens Otoni Gomide; 6 February 1956 (age 70) Goianésia, Goiás, Brazil
- Party: PT (since 1980)
- Awards: Order of Defence Merit

Rubens Otoni Gomide (born 6 February 1956) is a Brazilian politician and university professor. He has spent his political career representing Goiás, having served as state representative since 2003.

== Personal life ==
Otoni graduated with a degree in mechanical engineering from the Federal University of Uberlândia, and also has a degree in law from the Law School of Anápolis, and is currently a professor at UniEvangélica.

== Political career ==
Otoni voted against the impeachment of then-president Dilma Rousseff, and was one of her biggest supporters in congress. Otoni voted in opposition to the 2017 Brazilian labor reform, and would vote in favor of a corruption investigation into Rousseff's successor Michel Temer.

Otoni is a critic of Sergio Moro's anti-corruption campaign.
