= Dionilso Marcon =

Brazilian politician (born 1964)

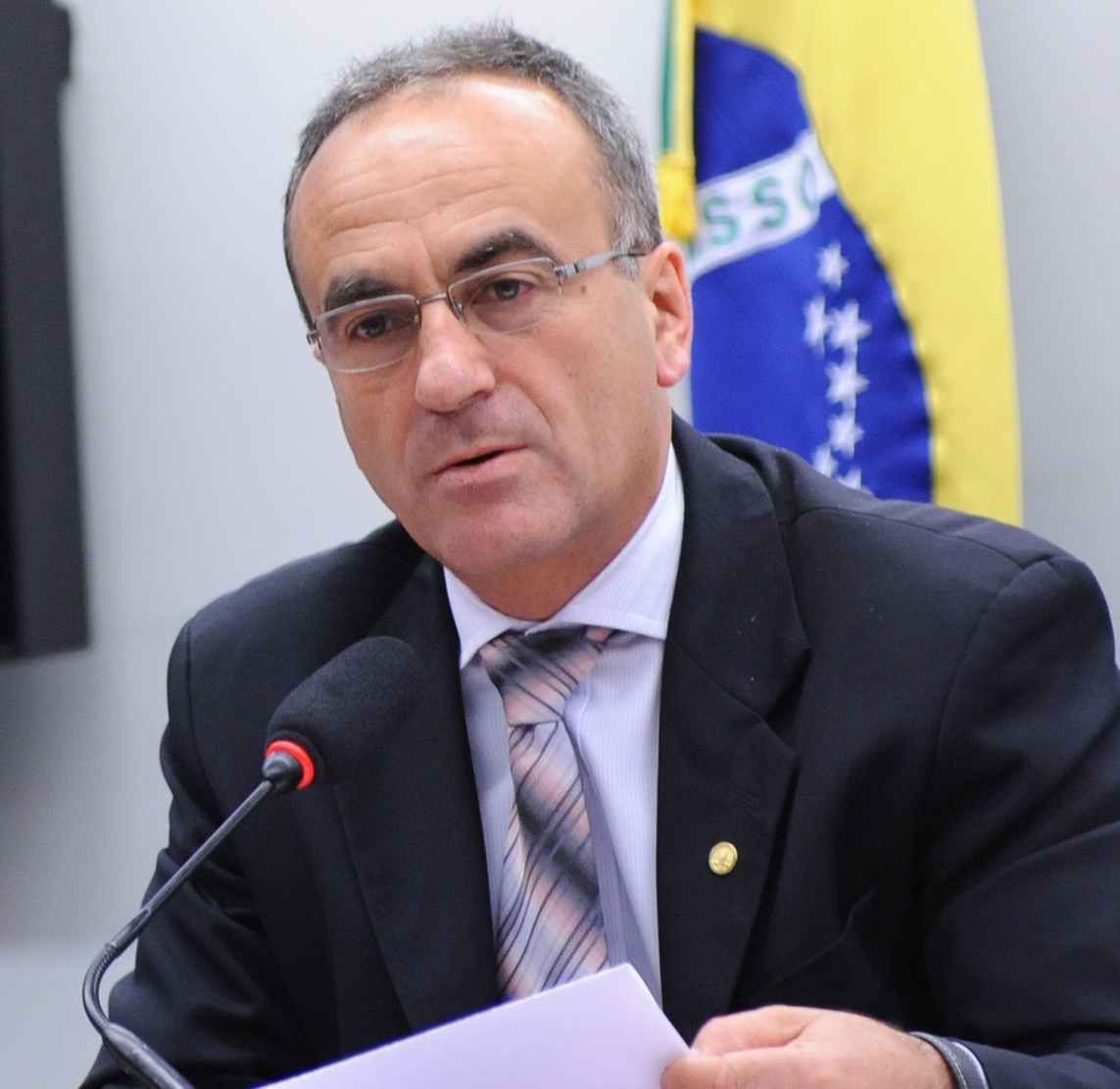
- Goergen in September 2015

Federal Deputy for Rio Grande do Sul
- Incumbent
- Assumed office 1 February 2011

Personal details
- Born: 21 September 1964 (age 61) Ronda Alta, RS, Brazil
- Party: PT

Dionilso Mateus Marcon (born 21 September 1964) sometimes better known as Deputado Marcon or Marcon is a Brazilian politician as well as a farmer. He has spent his political career representing his home state of Rio Grande do Sul, having served as state representative since 2011.

== Personal life ==
Marcon is the son of Antonio Marcon and Celia Marcon. Before becoming a politician he worked as an agriculturalist on a farm.

== Political career ==
Marcon voted in opposition to the impeachment of then-president Dilma Rousseff. He voted in against the 2017 Brazilian labor reform, and would vote in favor of a corruption investigation into Rousseff's successor Michel Temer.
