= Lindomar Garçon =

Brazilian politician (born 1969)

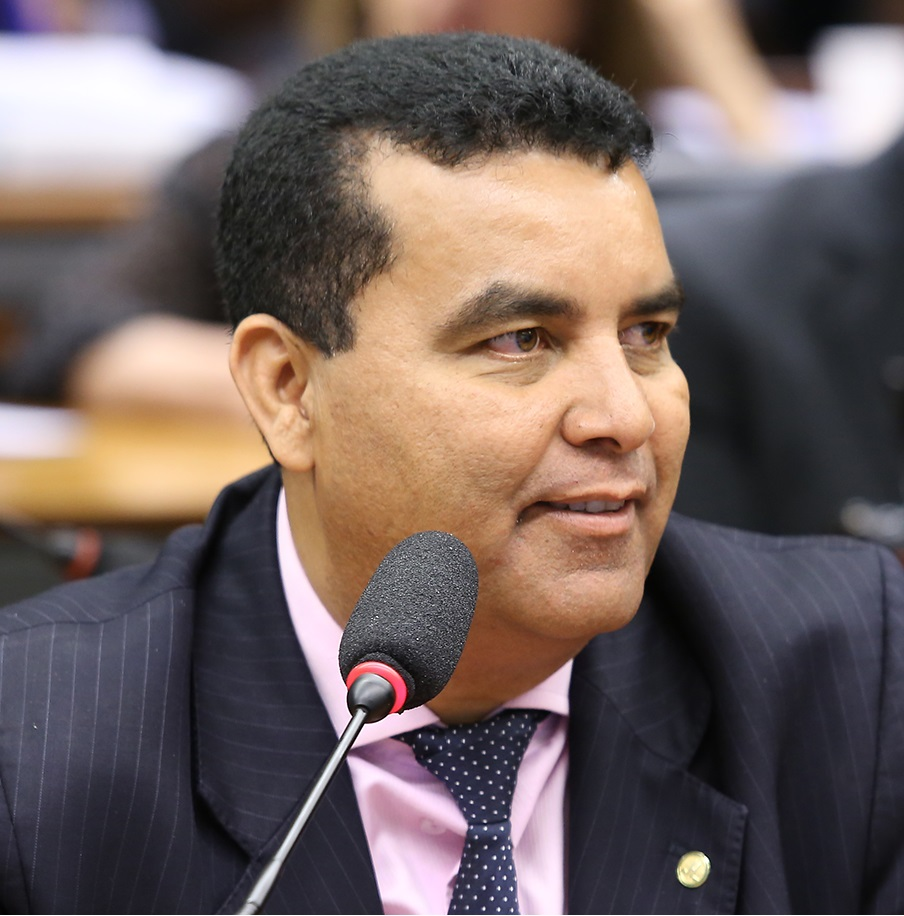
- Lindomar in March 2017

Federal Deputy for Rondônia
- In office 1 February 2015 – 31 January 2019

Mayor of Candeias do Jamari
- In office 1997–2004

Personal details
- Born: Lindomar Barbosa Alves; 18 October 1969 (age 56) Rondonópolis, Mato Grosso, Brazil
- Party: PRB (2018–); PDMB (2011–2018); PV (2007–2011); PSDB (1997–2007)

Lindomar Barbosa Alves (born 18 October 1969) better known as Lindomar Garçon is a Brazilian politician and pastor. Although born in Mato Grosso, he has spent his political career representing Rondônia, having served as state representative from 2007 to 2019.

== Personal life ==
Lindomar was born to Adão José Alves and Alcemira de Souza Barbosa Alves. In his early political career shortly before being elected mayor he adopted "Garçon" (meaning waiter) to his name as he has worked as a waiter in his youth. He is a pastor and elder in the Assembleias de Deus church.

== Political career ==
Lindomar voted in favor of the impeachment of then-president Dilma Rousseff. He voted in favor of the 2017 Brazilian labor reform, and would vote against a corruption investigation into Rousseff's successor Michel Temer.

In 2012 Lindomar ran for mayor in the city of Porto Velho, but was defeated in the second round of voting by Mauro Nazif Rasul.

In 2018 Lindomar switched allegiance to the Brazilian Republican Party, citing that the party's platform was more in line with his Christian values.
