= Jefferson Alves de Campos =

Brazilian politician (born 1964)

Jefferson Campos
- Jefferson Campos (2021)

Federal Deputy for São Paulo
- Incumbent
- Assumed office 1 January 2008
- In office 1 February 2002 – 31 January 2006

Councilor of Sorocaba
- In office 1996–2002

Personal details
- Born: 26 October 1964 (age 61) Ourinhos, São Paulo, Brazil
- Party: PL (2022–present); PSB (2018–2022); PSD (2011–2018); PSB (prior to 2011)

Jefferson Alves de Campos (born 26 October 1964) more commonly known as Jefferson Campos is a Brazilian politician, lawyer, and pastor. He has spent his political career representing São Paulo, having served as federal deputy representative since 2011.

== Personal life ==
Jefferson Campos was born to Zarias Alves de Campos and Berenice Pereira Gomes de Campos. He was a lawyer prior to entering politics. He is a pastor of the International Church of the Foursquare Gospel church, and a vice-president of the Brazilian division of the Foursquare Church.

== Political career ==
As councilor of Sorocaba Campos was key in passing Law No. 5,921 which allowed for Christian creationism to be included in elementary school's curriculum. In 2007 Camps was one of 57 politicians to be investigated in a scandal for taking bribes from a medical firm. In 2014 the São Paulo court officially acquitted him of taking part in the scandal, although he is still suspected of taking bribes in separate events.

Campos voted in favor of the impeachment against then-president Dilma Rousseff and political reformation. He would later vote in favor of opening a corruption investigation against Rousseff's successor Michel Temer, and also voted in favor of the Brazil labor reform (2017). In 2011 he switched from the PSB to the newly created PSD. Since 2022 he is a member of the Liberal Party (PL).
