= Francisco Floriano =

Brazilian politician (born 1959)

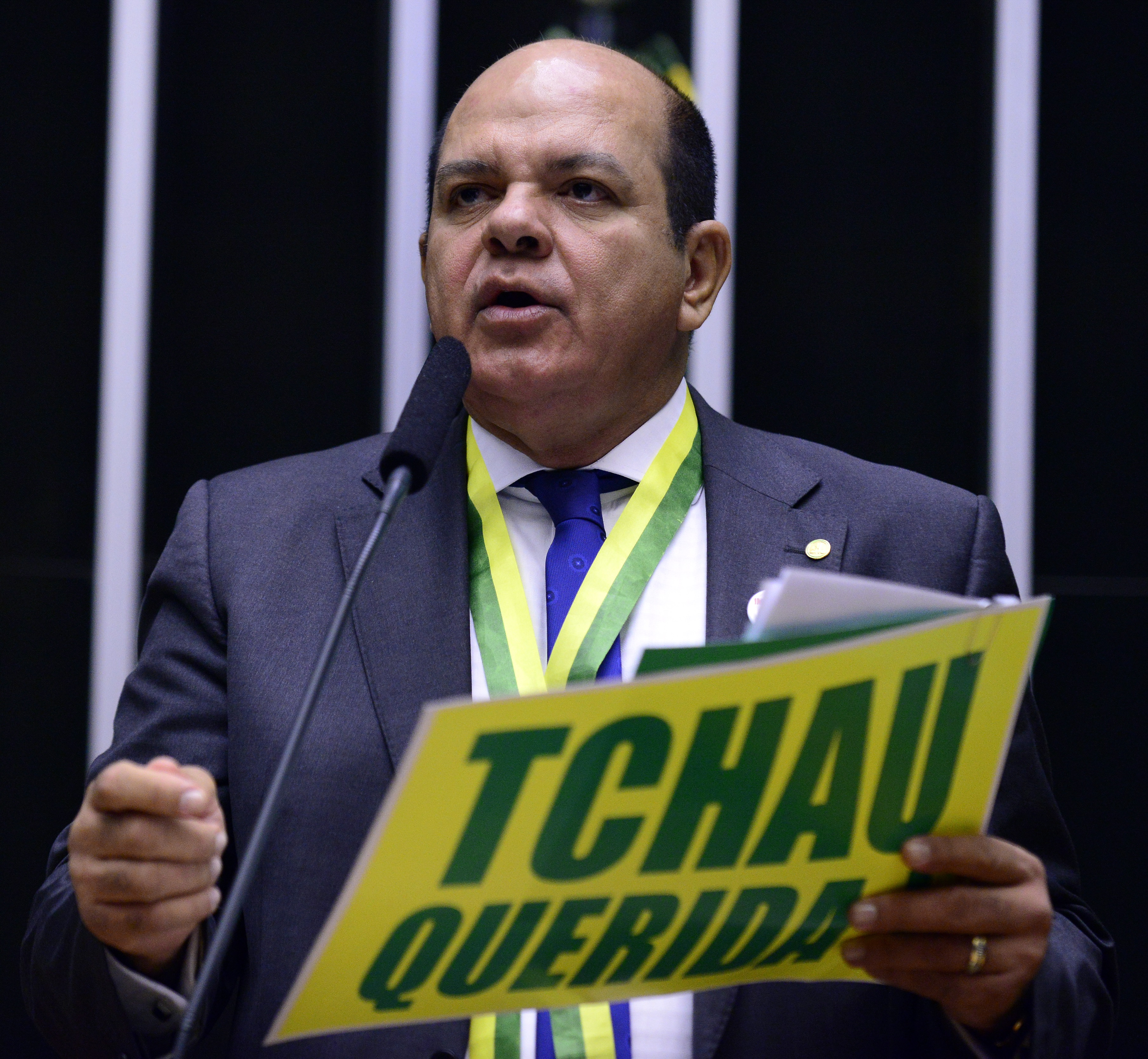
- Floriano in April 2016

Federal Deputy for Rio de Janeiro
- In office 1 February 2011 – 31 January 2019

Personal details
- Born: 21 September 1959 (age 67) Rio de Janeiro, Brazil
- Party: DEM (2016–present)
- Other political affiliations: PL (2010–2016)

Francisco Floriano de Sousa Silva (born 21 September 1959) more commonly known as Fábio Sousa is a Brazilian politician. He has spent his political career representing Rio de Janeiro, having served as state representative from 2011 to 2019.

== Personal life ==
Floriano is the son of Evaristo Lopes da Silva e Maria de Sousa Silva, and is married to Elias Pereira da Silva. He is a pastor in the neo-Pentecostal church Igreja Mundial do Poder de Deus.

== Political career ==
Floriano voted in favor of the impeachment of then-president Dilma Rousseff. Floriano voted in favor of the 2017 Brazilian labor reform, and would oppose a corruption investigation into Rousseff's successor Michel Temer.

In 2017, Floriano was found guilty of diverting government funds for the usage of his church. He was also convicted of lying under oath and taking financial advantage of prisoners during his church's mission visits to prisons. As a result, he and his family were barred from visiting prisons in Rio de Janeiro and he was barred from running in the 2018 election.
