= Nilton Capixaba =

Brazilian politician

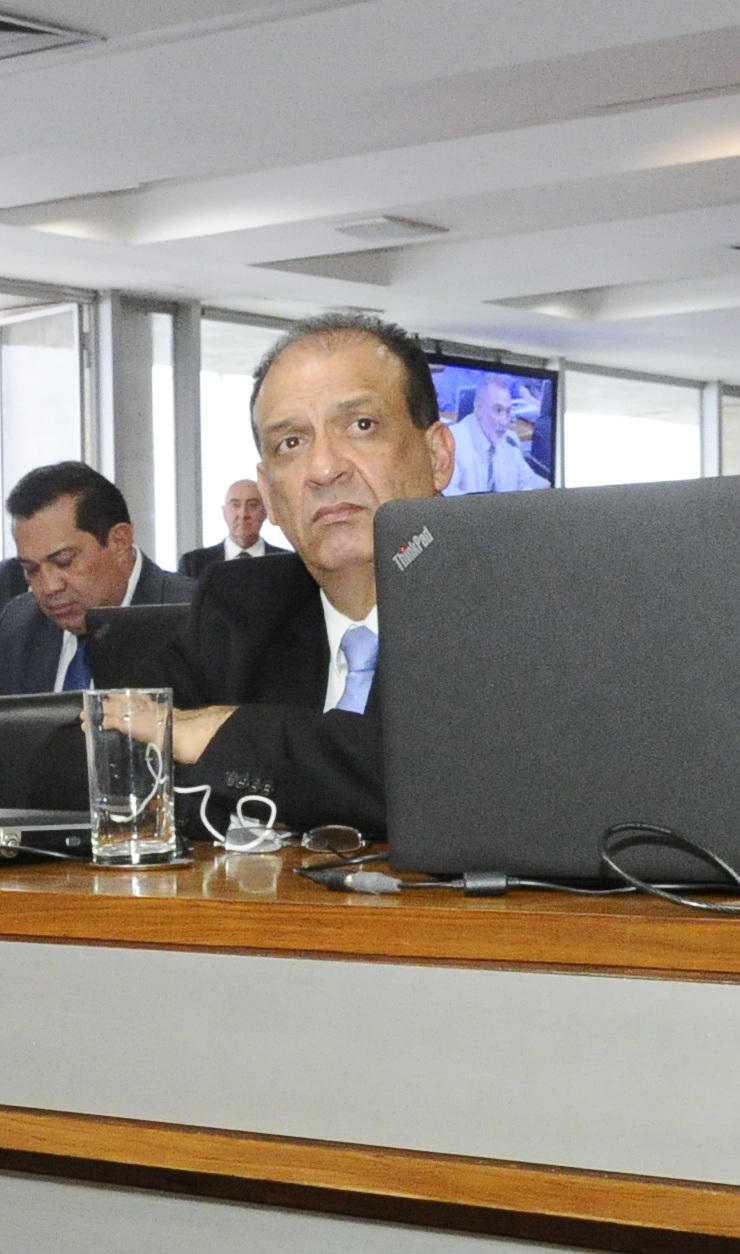
- Capixaba in April 2018

Federal Deputy for Rondônia
- In office 1 February 2015 – 31 January 2019

Personal details
- Born: Nilton Balbino; 9 February 1960 (age 66) Cuparaque, Minas Gerais, Brazil
- Party: PTB

Nilton Balbino (born 9 February 1960) better known as Nilton Capixaba is a Brazilian politician. Although born in Minas Gerais, he has spent his political career representing Rondônia, having served as state representative from 2015 to 2019.

== Personal life ==
Capixaba was born to Nilson Balbino and Ernestina Soares. He is a member of the Assembleias de Deus church.

== Political career ==
Capixaba voted in favor of the impeachment motion of then-president Dilma Rousseff. Capixaba would vote against a similar corruption investigation into Rousseff's successor Michel Temer, and he voted in favor of the 2017 Brazilian labor reforms.

In February 2018 Capixaba was investigated and ultimately convicted of passive corruption, and was given a 6-year, 10 month, and six day open prison sentence. In the scheme Capixaba and other politicians from the state of Rondônia accepted over RS 1 million from an ambulance union to make sure only their ambulances were operating in the state. However, during this time Capixaba was still allowed to continue working as a federal deputy.
