= Guilherme Mussi =

Brazilian politician (born 1982)

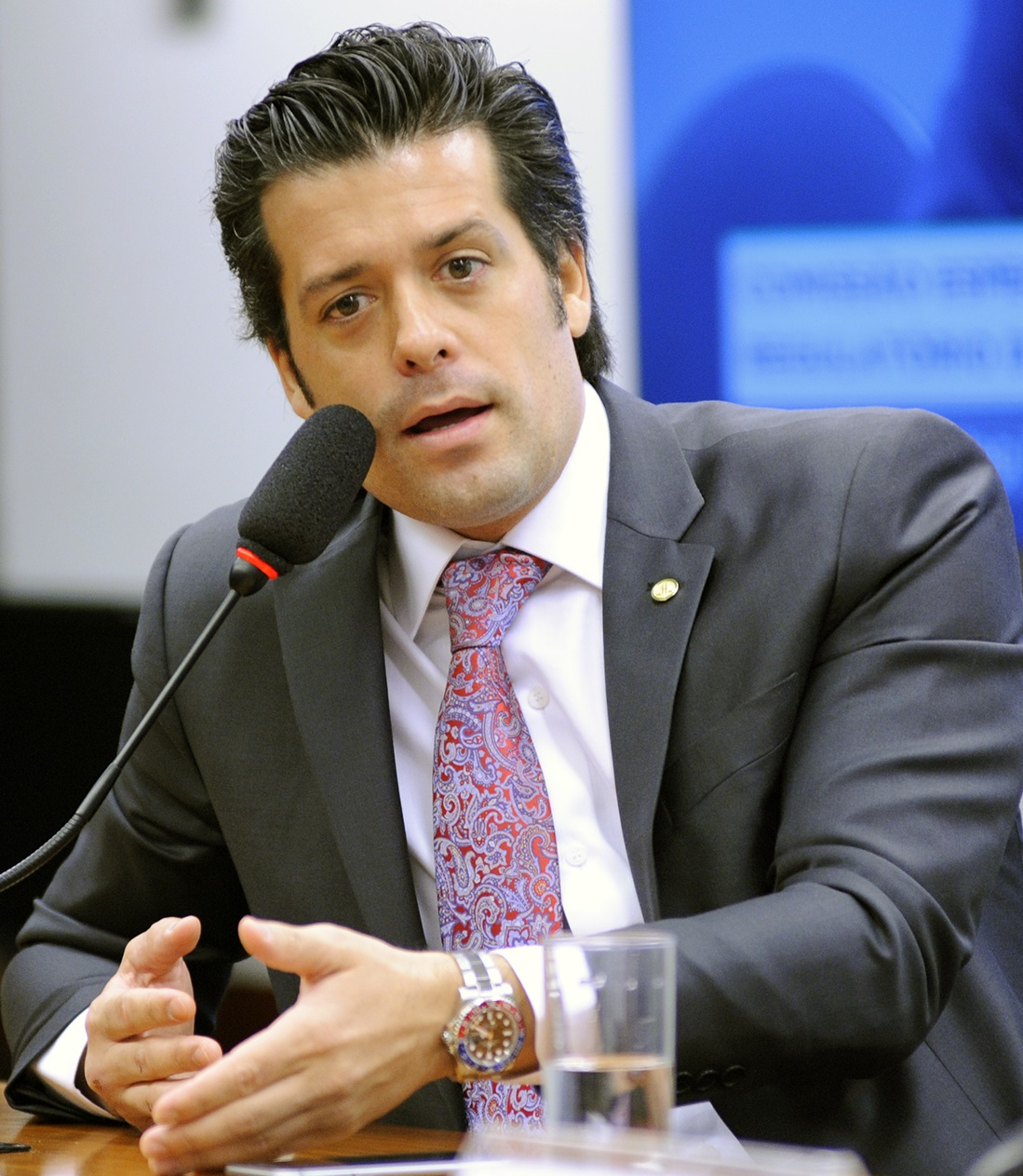
- Mussi in 2016

Member of the Chamber of Deputies
- In office 1 February 2011 – 31 January 2023
- Constituency: São Paulo

Personal details
- Born: 14 October 1982 (age 43)
- Party: Progressistas (since 2013)
- Relatives: Eliana Tranchesi (ex-mother-in-law); Silvio Santos (ex-father-in-law)

Guilherme Mussi Ferreira (born 14 October 1982) is a Brazilian politician. From 2011 to 2023, he was a member of the Chamber of Deputies. He has been a member of Progressistas since 2013.
