= Carlos Eduardo Cadoca =

Brazilian politician and lawyer (1940–2020)

Cadoca

City councilor of Recife
- In office 1983–1995

Member of the Legislative Assembly of Pernambuco
- In office 1995–1999

Member of the Chamber of Deputies from Pernambuco
- In office 1999–2019

Personal details
- Born: April 23, 1940 Recife, Pernambuco, Brazil
- Died: December 13, 2020 (aged 80) Recife, Pernambuco, Brazil
- Party: Democratic Labour Party (Brazil) (PDT)
- Other political affiliations: PMDB (former); PSC (former); PCdoB (former)
- Education: Faculdade de Direito do Recife, Federal University of Pernambuco
- Profession: Politician, lawyer

Carlos Eduardo Cintra da Costa Pereira (23 April 1940 – 13 December 2020), better known as Carlos Eduardo Cadoca or simply Cadoca, was a Brazilian politician and lawyer.

== Career ==
Before pursuing a career in politics, Cadoca went to Faculdade de Direito do Recife, a law school, part of the Federal University of Pernambuco and graduated in 1967.

Between the years of 1983 and 1995, Cadoca served as City councilor of Recife.

In 1994, Cadoca was elected Member of the Legislative Assembly of Pernambuco. His first and only term lasted from 1995 to 1999.

In 1998, he was elected Member of the Chamber of Deputies representing his birth state of Pernambuco. His first term went from 1999 to 2003.

In 2002, he was re-elected Federal Deputy for Pernambuco. His second term lasted from 2003 to 2007.

In 2006, he was again re-elected Federal Deputy. His third tenure started in 2007 and ended in 2011.

In 2010, he was elected Federal Deputy for the fourth consecutive time. He remained in power from 2011 to 2015.

In 2014, Cadoca was elected Federal Deputy for the fifth and last time. This time he remained in power between the years of 2015 and 2019.

== Personal life and death ==
Cadoca was married to Berenice de Andrade Lima and had four sons.

He died from complications brought on by COVID-19 in Recife at the age of 80 on 13 December 2020, during the COVID-19 pandemic in Brazil.
