= Consolidation of Labor Laws =

Decree which governs labor relations in Brazil

The Consolidation of Labor Laws (Portuguese: Consolidação das Leis do Trabalho, CLT), officially Decree Law No. 5,452, is the decree which governs labor relations in Brazil. It was issued in 1943 by Getúlio Vargas, President of Brazil and was officially adopted on May 1, 1943. The Constitution allowed him to issue decrees to regulate all matters that were supposed to be regulated by the federal legislative branch while the Parliament didn't assemble. The Parliament never assembled during the period in which that Constitution was valid.

Some sources defend that the CLL was partly inspired by labor laws under Benito Mussolini in Italy, although there is no evidence to back such claim.

Article 199 of the Consolidation of Labor Laws protects a worker's right to sit.
