= Zé Silva =

Brazilian politician (born 1963)

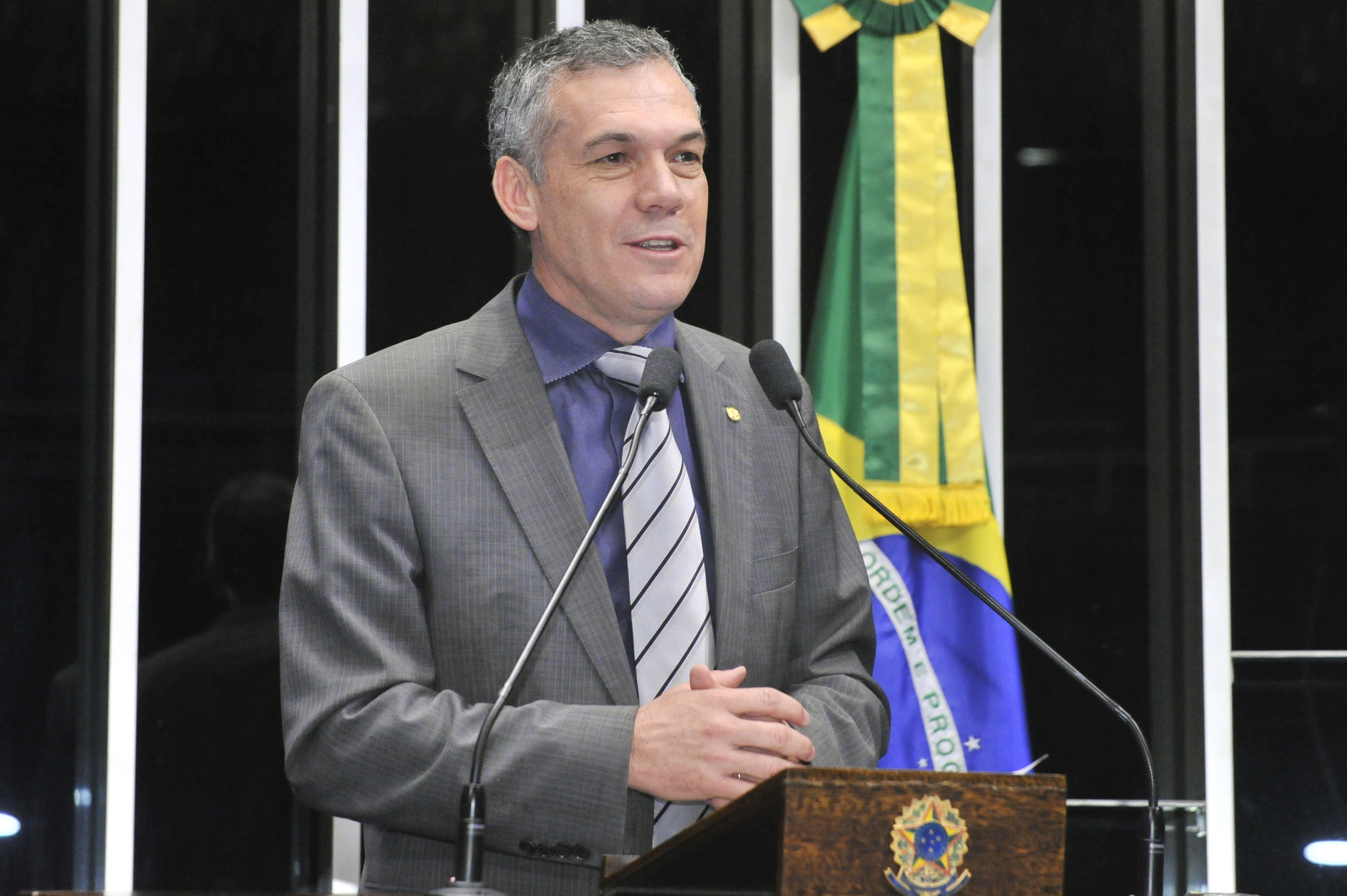
- Silva in 2015

Member of the Chamber of Deputies
- Incumbent
- Assumed office 1 February 2011
- Constituency: Minas Gerais

Personal details
- Born: 10 May 1963 (age 62)
- Party: Solidarity (since 2013)

José Silva Soares, better known as Zé Silva (born 10 May 1963), is a Brazilian politician serving as a member of the Chamber of Deputies since 2011. He has served as chairman of the elderly rights committee since 2025.
