= Romero Rodrigues (politician) =

Brazilian politician (born 1966)

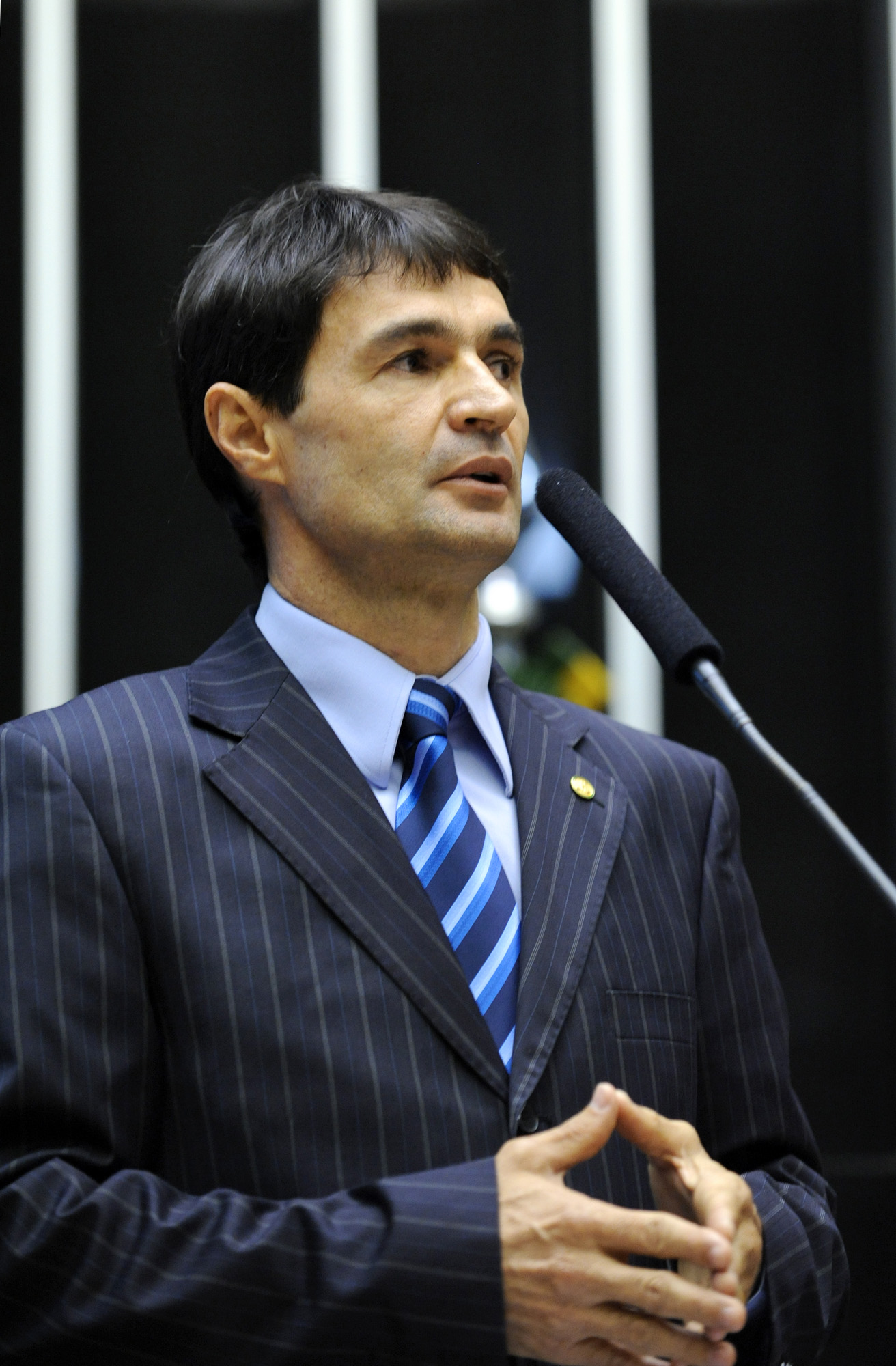
- Rodrigues in 2011

Member of the Chamber of Deputies
- Incumbent
- Assumed office 1 February 2023
- Constituency: Paraíba
- In office 1 February 2011 – 1 January 2013
- Succeeded by: Major Fábio
- Constituency: Paraíba

Personal details
- Born: 9 January 1966 (age 60)
- Party: Podemos (since 2023)

Romero Rodrigues Veiga (born 9 January 1966) is a Brazilian politician. He has been a member of the Chamber of Deputies since 2023, having previously served from 2011 to 2013. From 2013 to 2020, he served as mayor of Campina Grande.
