= Pinto Itamaraty =

Brazilian politician

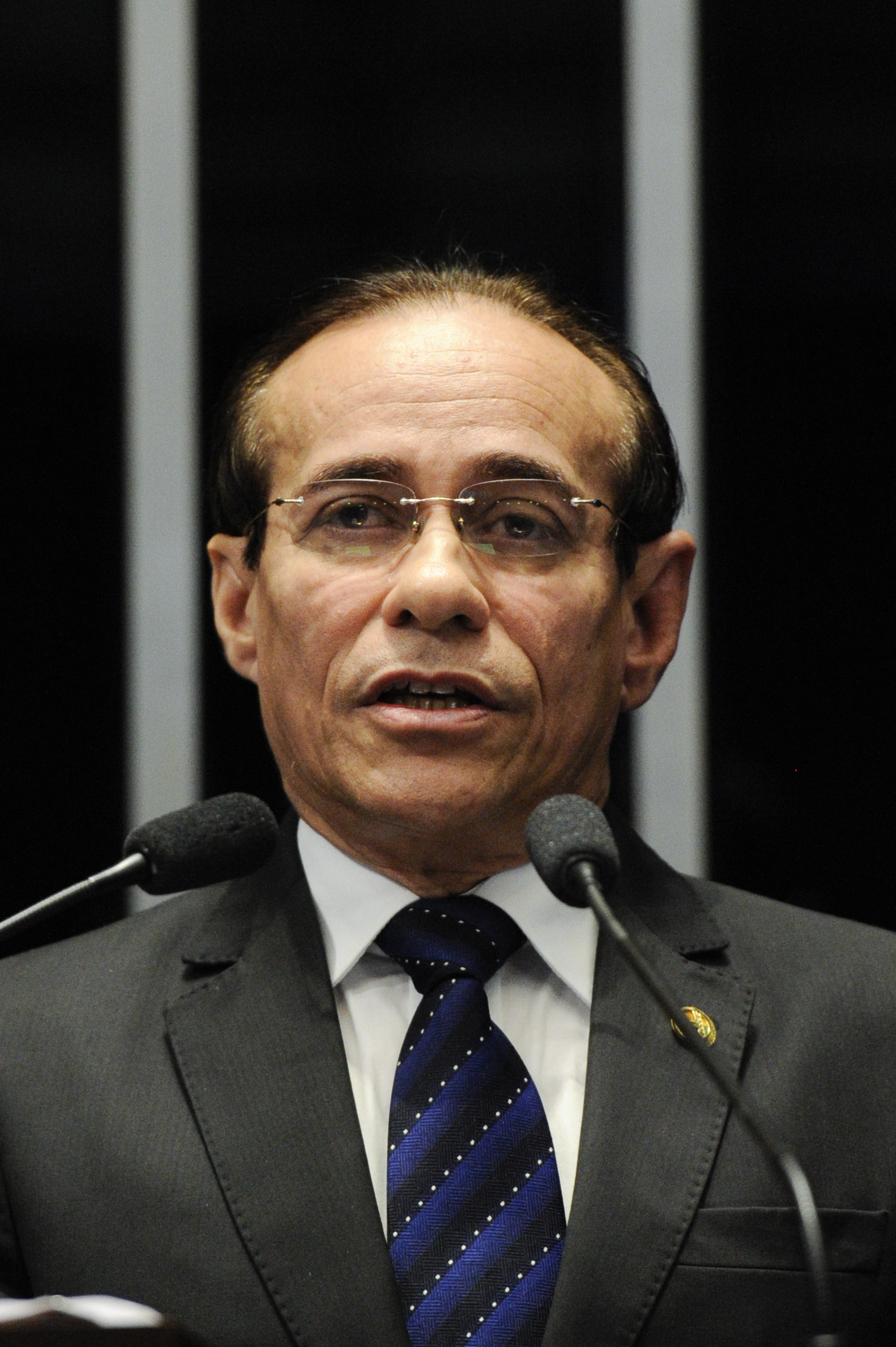

Senator from Maranhão
- In office October 5, 2016 – January 26, 2017

Federal deputy from Maranhão
- In office February 1, 2007 – January 31, 2015

Councilman of São Luís
- In office January 1, 2001 – January 31, 2007

Personal details
- Born: José Eleonildo Soares; May 10, 1960 (age 66) São Luís, MA
- Party: REPUBLICANOS (2017-present)
- Other political affiliations: PSDB (2006-2017); PTB
- Profession: Politician

José Eleonildo Soares, better known as Pinto Itamaraty (born May 10, 1960 in São Luís) is a Brazilian politician. He was alderman (2001–2007) and federal deputy (2007–2015). Itamaraty served as senator from Maranhão.
