= José Linhares Ponte =

Brazilian politician (1930–2025)

Member of the Chamber of Deputies of Brazil for Ceará
- In office 1 February 1991 – 31 January 2015

Personal details
- Born: 21 October 1930 Sobral, Ceará, Brazil
- Died: 8 January 2025 (aged 94) Fortaleza, Ceará, Brazil
- Party: PP
- Education: Federal University of Piauí; LMU Munich
- Occupation: Priest; Philosopher

José Linhares Ponte (21 October 1930 – 8 January 2025) was a Brazilian politician. A member of the Brazilian Progressive Party, he served in the Chamber of Deputies from 1991 to 2015.

Ponte died in Fortaleza on 8 January 2025, at the age of 94.
