= Flávia Morais =

Brazilian politician (born 1969)

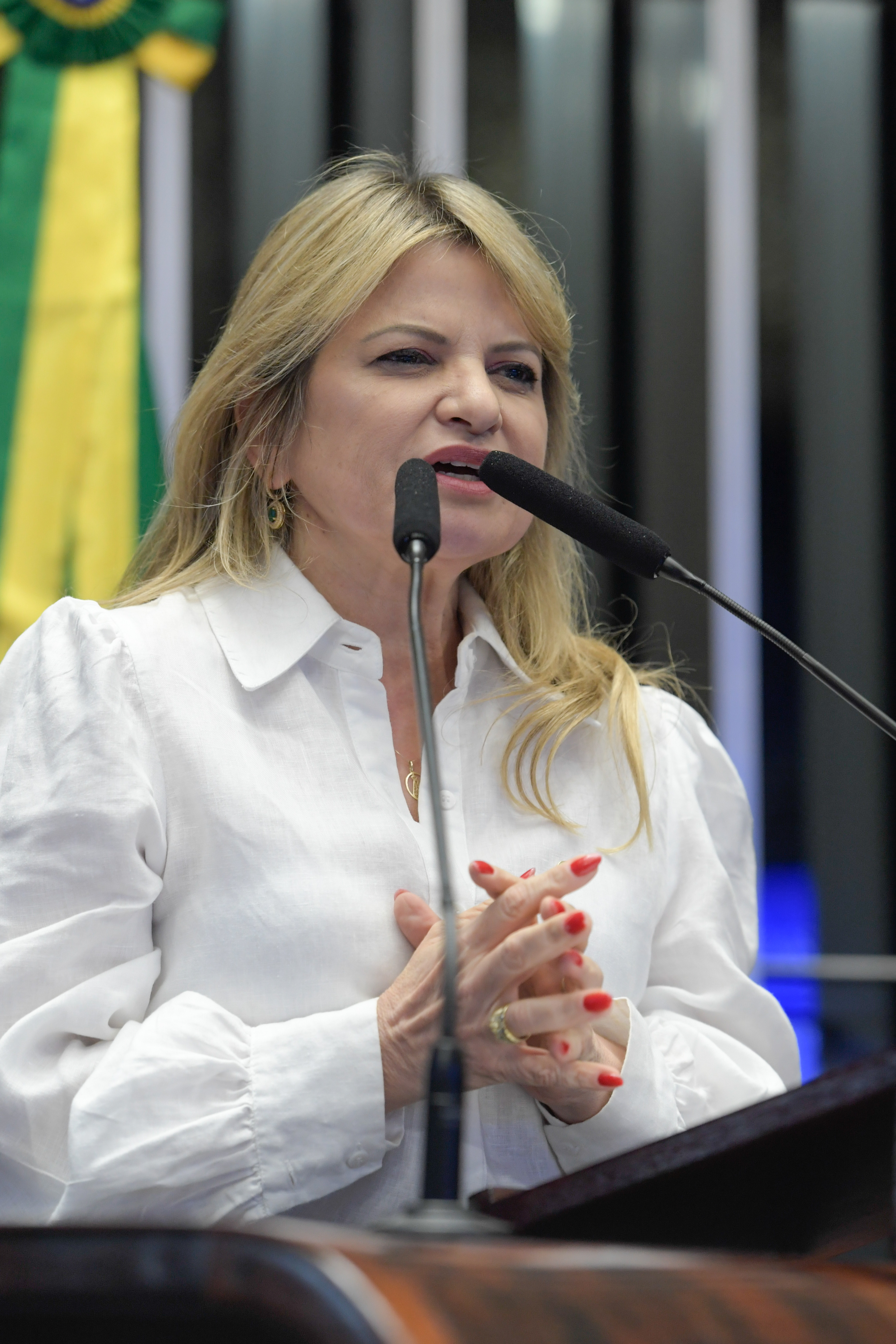
- Morais in 2025

Member of the Chamber of Deputies
- Incumbent
- Assumed office 1 February 2011
- Constituency: Goiás

Personal details
- Born: 26 April 1969 (age 57)
- Party: Democratic Labour Party (since 2009)
- Spouse: George Morais

Flávia Carreiro Albuquerque Morais (born 26 April 1969) is a Brazilian politician serving as a member of the Chamber of Deputies since 2011. From 2003 to 2011, she was a member of the Legislative Assembly of Goiás.
