= João Lyra =

Brazilian businessman and politician (1931–2021)

Senator for Alagoas
- In office 1 January 1989 – 1 February 1990

Federal Deputy for Alagoas
- In office 1 February 2011 – 1 February 2015
- In office 1 February 2003 – 1 February 2007

Personal details
- Born: 17 June 1931 Maceió, Alagoas, Brazil
- Died: 12 August 2021 (aged 90)
- Party: PDS (1980–1985); MDB (1985–1990); PSC (1990–1993); PSB (1993–1997); PTB (1997–2011); PSD (2011–2021)

João José Pereira de Lyra (17 June 1931 – 12 August 2021) was a Brazilian businessman and politician.

== Career ==
Lyra was a senator from 1989 to 1991, and a federal deputy from 2003 to 2007, and from 2011 to 2015. His wealth was once estimated at $140 million, making him at one point Brazil's richest Member of Parliament.

He was named in the 2016 Panama Papers leak.

== Death ==
Lyra died from complications of pneumonia and bronchoaspiration in August 2021, following a battle with COVID-19.
