= Padre João =

Brazilian politician (born 1967)

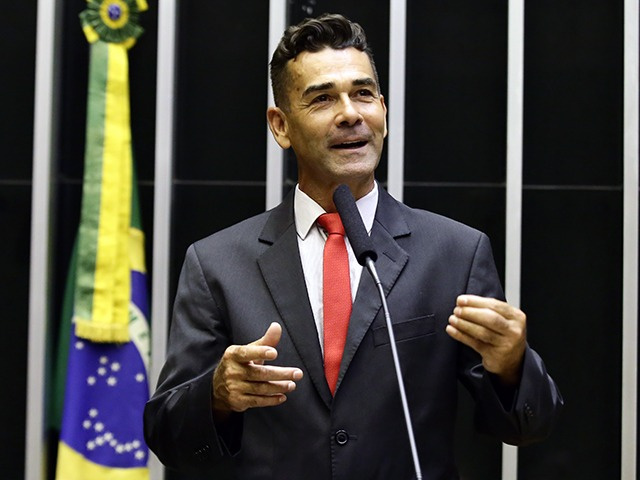
- João in 2021

Member of the Chamber of Deputies
- Incumbent
- Assumed office 1 February 2011
- Constituency: Minas Gerais

Personal details
- Born: 28 February 1967 (age 59)
- Party: Workers' Party (since 1995)

João Carlos Siqueira, better known as Padre João (born 28 February 1967), is a Brazilian politician serving as a member of the Chamber of Deputies since 2011. From 2003 to 2011, he was a member of the Legislative Assembly of Minas Gerais.
