= André Zacharow =

Brazilian lawyer (1939–2021)

Personal details
- Born: 7 July 1939 Jaguariaíva, Paraná, Third Brazilian Republic
- Died: 10 September 2021 (aged 82) Curitiba, Paraná, Brazil
- Education: Federal University of Paraná

André Zacharow (7 July 1939 – 10 September 2021) was a Brazilian economist, lawyer, academic, and politician who served as a Federal Deputy from Paraná.

== Biography ==
Zacharow was born in Jaguariaíva, Paraná. He was a graduate of the Federal University of Paraná.

He served as a member of the Chamber of Deputies from 2003 to 2015. He was originally elected as a member of PDT, but finished his term as a member of MDB.

Zacharow died from COVID-19 in September 2021, amid the COVID-19 pandemic in Brazil.
