= Domingos Sávio =

Brazilian politician (born 1957)

- Sávio in 2022

Senator-elect for Minas Gerais
- Assuming office 1 February 2027

Member of the Chamber of Deputies
- Incumbent
- Assumed office 1 February 2011
- Constituency: Minas Gerais

Member of the Legislative Assembly of Minas Gerais
- In office 1 February 2003 – 1 February 2011
- Constituency: At-large

Personal details
- Born: Domingos Sávio Campos Resende; 25 March 1957 (age 69) São Tiago, Minas Gerais, Brazil
- Party: PL (since 2022)
- Other political affiliations: PSDB (1988–2022)
- Education: Federal University of Minas Gerais
- Profession: Veterinarian

Domingos Sávio Campos Resende (born 25 March 1957) is a Brazilian politician serving as a member of the Chamber of Deputies since 2011. From 2003 to 2011, he was a member of the Legislative Assembly of Minas Gerais. From 1997 to 2000, he served as mayor of Divinópolis.
