= State University of Southwestern Bahia =

University in Brazil

- Universidade Estadual do Sudoeste da Bahia
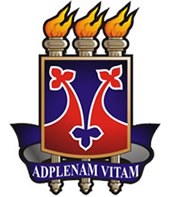
- Other name: UESB

State University of Southwestern Bahia (Portuguese: Universidade Estadual do Sudoeste da Bahia, UESB) was founded in 1980 in the city of Vitória da Conquista, in the Brazilian state of Bahia. Today it has three campuses, located in the cities of Vitória da Conquista, Jequié and Itapetinga. It currently offers 43 undergraduate and postgraduate degree programs.

== See also ==
- List of state universities in Brazil
