= Dimas Fabiano =

Brazilian politician (born 1973)

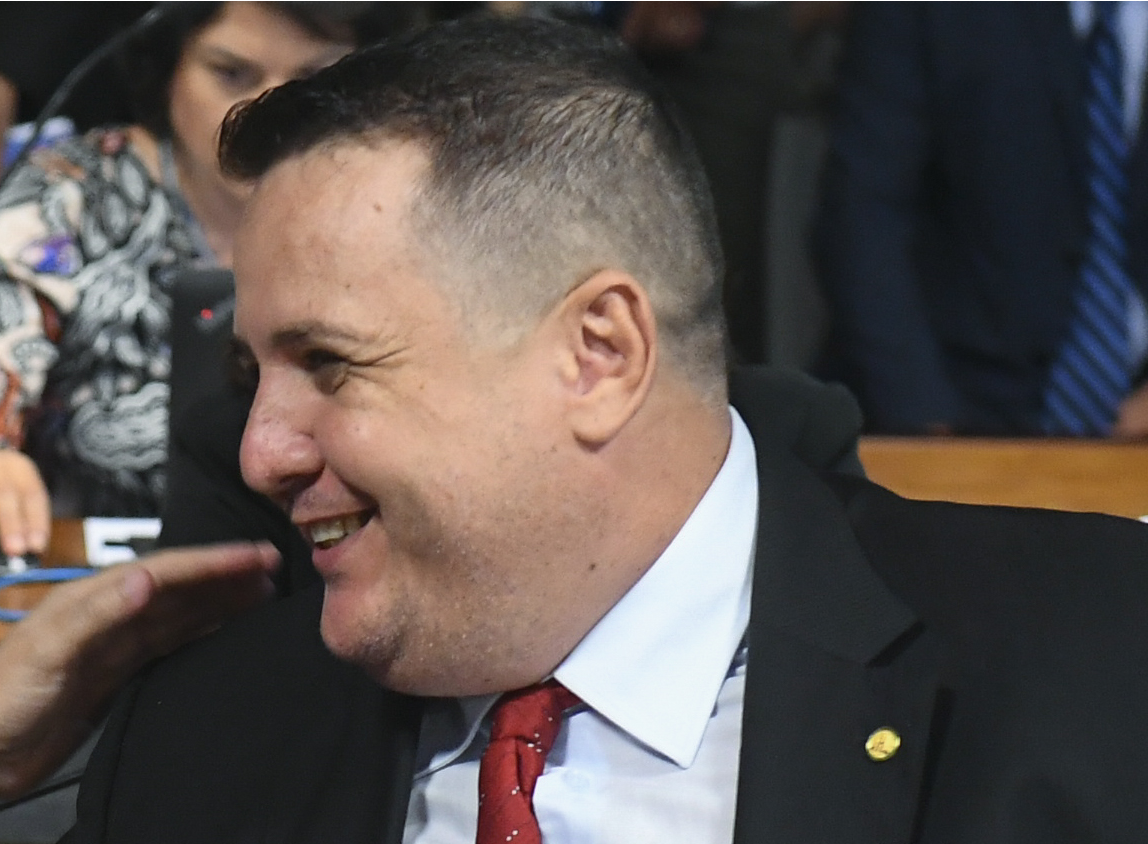
- Fabiano in 2020

Member of the Chamber of Deputies
- Incumbent
- Assumed office 1 February 2011
- Constituency: Minas Gerais

Personal details
- Born: 23 May 1973 (age 52)
- Party: Progressistas

Dimas Fabiano Toledo Junior (born 23 May 1973) is a Brazilian politician serving as a member of the Chamber of Deputies since 2011. From 2003 to 2011, he was a member of the Legislative Assembly of Minas Gerais.
