= Diego Andrade (politician) =

Brazilian politician

Diego Leonardo de Andrade Carvalho
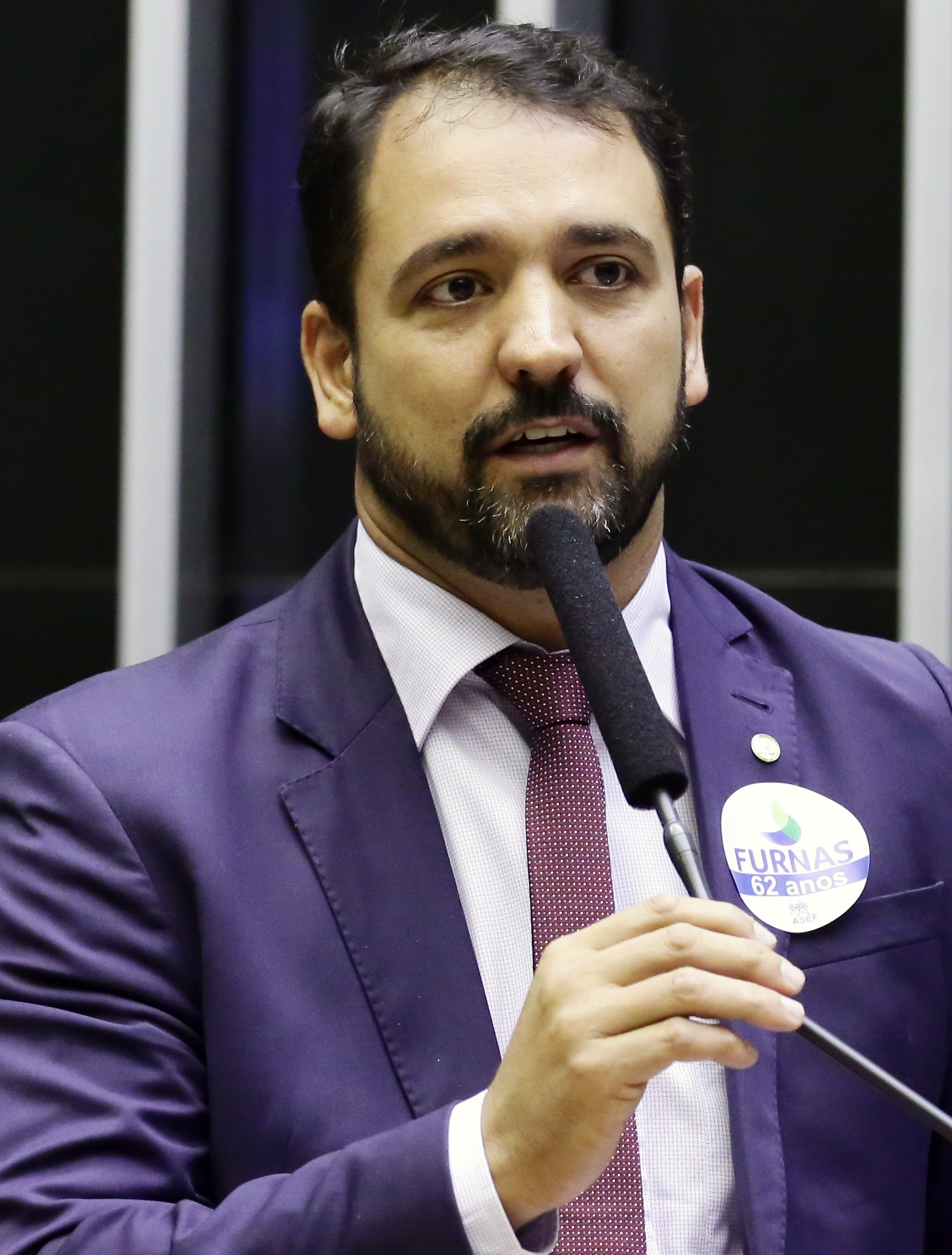
- Diego Andrade in 2019
- Born: August 8, 1977 (age 49)
- Occupation: Politician
- Known for: Majority Leader of the Chamber of Deputies
- Title: Majority Leader of the Chamber of Deputies since April 5, 2021
- Political party: Social Democratic Party

Diego Leonardo de Andrade Carvalho (born 8 August 1977) is a Brazilian politician from the Social Democratic Party. He has been Majority Leader of the Chamber of Deputies since 5 April 2021.
