= 2017 Brazilian labor reform =

Brazilian Labor Reform (Law 13,467, of July 13th, 2017)
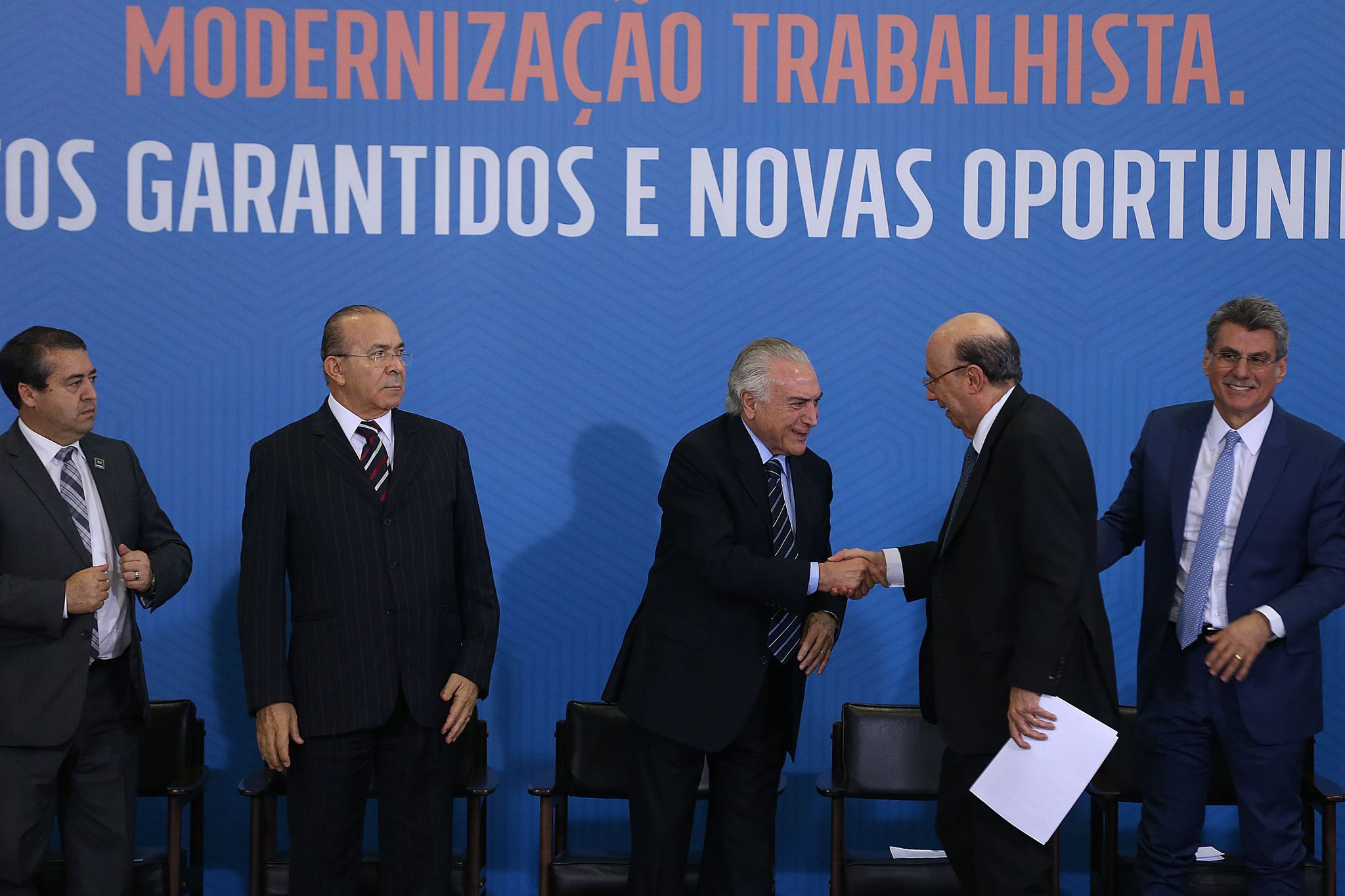
- President Michel Temer with ministers and congressmen after signing the bill

National Congress
- Long title: Changes the Consolidation of Labor Laws (CLT), approved by Decree-Law 5452, of May 1, 1943, and Laws 6019, of January 3, 1974, 8036, of May 11, 1990, and 8212, of July 24, 1991, to adequate the legislation to new labor relations
- Territorial extent: Whole of Brazil
- Passed by: Chamber of Deputies
- Passed: April 26, 2017
- Passed by: Federal Senate
- Passed: July 11, 2017
- Signed by: President Michel Temer
- Signed: July 13, 2017
- Effective: November 10, 2017

Legislative history

Initiating chamber: Chamber of Deputies
- Bill title: Law Project 6787/2016
- Bill citation: PL 6787/2016
- Introduced by: President Michel Temer
- Introduced: December 23, 2016
- First reading: February 3, 2017
- Second reading: April 20, 2017
- Third reading: April 26, 2017
- Passed: April 26, 2017
- Voting summary: 296 voted for; 177 voted against; 39 absent; 1 present not voting

Revising chamber: Federal Senate
- Bill title: Chamber Law Project 38/2017
- Bill citation: PLC 38/2017
- Received from the Chamber of Deputies: April 28, 2017
- First reading: May 2, 2017
- Second reading: June 29, 2017
- Third reading: June 6, 2017
- Passed: July 11, 2017
- Voting summary: 50 voted for; 26 voted against; 1 abstained; 3 absent; 1 present not voting

Keywords
- Consolidation of Labor Laws; Labor law
- Status: In force

The 2017 labor reform in Brazil was a significant change in the country's Consolidation of Labor Laws (Portuguese: Consolidação das Leis do Trabalho). According to the government, the goal of the reform was to combat unemployment and the still ongoing 2014 Brazilian economic crisis.

The bill was proposed and sent to the Chamber of Deputies by the president Michel Temer on December 23, 2016. Since then, during its processing in the National Congress, it was going through several debates and additions to the original bill, for example, the proposal to end the obligatory syndicate (labor union) tax paid by workers hired under the CLT.

The bill was approved by the Chamber on April 26, 2017, with 296 favorable votes and 177 against. Later, in the Federal Senate, it was approved on July 11, 2017, by 50 versus 26 votes. It was then sanctioned by the president on July 13, 2017, with no vetoes. The law will start to be valid on November 11 of the same year, 120 days after the sanction.

Labor reform was controversial in Brazilian society. Its supporters argue that the reform addresses legal certainty and increase the number of jobs. Its critics argue that the reform violates the Brazilian constitution and International Labour Organization conventions signed by Brazil.

== Changes ==
Most of the changes involve intricate details. The most simple changes were:

	Former rule	New rule
Union tax	The tax is obligatory. The worker must pay the equivalent of one day of work every year	The contribution is optional.
Vacation	The 30 day annual vacation time can be divided into at most into two periods. One of them can't be shorter than 10 days.	They can be divided into three periods at most, through negotiation, as long as one of the periods is at least 15 days long.
Home office	It isn't regulated under the legislation	Anything that the worker uses at home will be formalized via contract, such as equipment and expenses such as internet and electricity. The worker will get paid based on the tasks he accomplishes.
Working hours	Limited to 8 hours per day at most, or 44 hours per week. There can be two extra hours per day at most.	They can be 12 hours per day at most, with 36 hours of rest, as long as the 44 hour limit (per week) is respected.
Time at work	The CLT considers that the work hours correspond to the period in which the worker is available, including the moments when he is awaiting orders.	The moments when the worker is doing activities not directly related to his job, such as rest, lunch, interaction with coworkers, personal hygiene, etc., is not included in the work hours.

== See also ==
- 2017 Brazilian general strike
- Outsourcing law in Brazil
- Brazil Fiscal reform (2016)
