= 2016 President of the Chamber of Deputies of Brazil special election =

July 2016 President of the Chamber of Deputies of Brazil election
- 14 July 2016

Needed to Win: Majority of the votes cast 460 votes cast, 231 needed for a majority
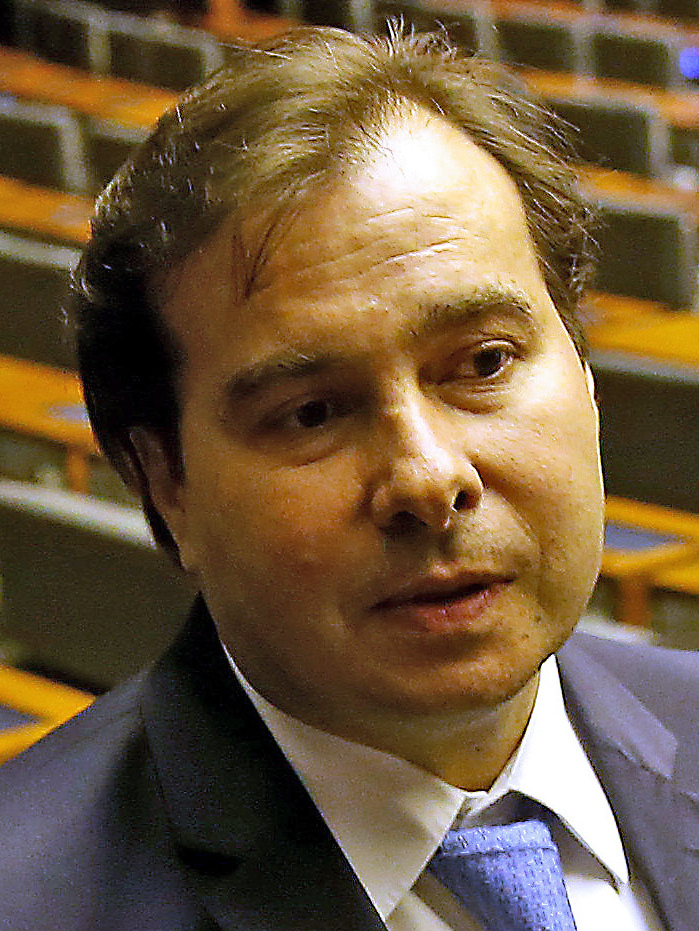

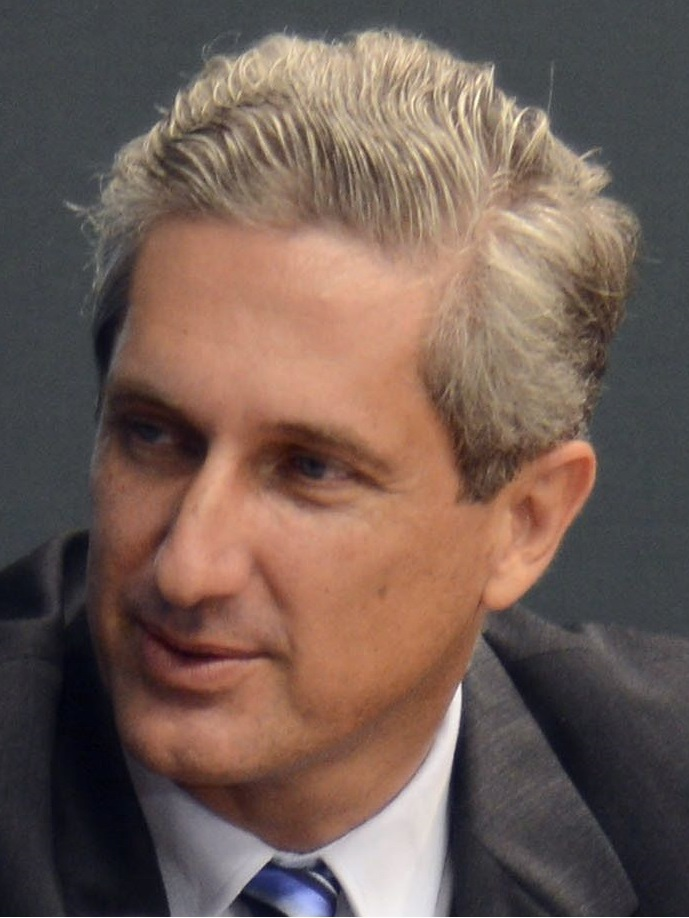
| | Majority party | Third party |
|---|---|---|
| Candidate | Rodrigo Maia | Rogério Rosso |
| Party | DEM | PSD |
| Leader's seat | Rio de Janeiro | Federal District |
| Members' vote | 285 | 170 |
President before election
Waldir Maranhão (acting)
PP
Elected President
Rodrigo Maia
DEM

A special election for the position of president of the Chamber of Deputies of Brazil took place on July 14, 2016, during the 55th legislature. The election was necessary due to the resignation of Eduardo Cunha, announced on the 7th of that month. According to the Brazilian Constitution, the president of the Chamber of Deputies is the second in line of succession to the Presidency of the Republic (the first being the Vice President).

Elected to the position in February 2015, Cunha decided to resign from office to increase his chances of not being impeached by the full House. He had been removed from his duties as a parliamentarian by the Supreme Federal Court (Superior Tribunal Federal - STF) on May 5, 2016. The STF concluded that Cunha had been using his power to interfere with Operation Car Wash, which was investigating him and his family.

The first round had 13 candidates. Rodrigo Maia (DEM-RJ) received 120 votes, followed by Rogério Rosso (PSD-DF) with 106 and Marcelo Castro (PMDB-PI), who got 70 votes. Another 198 votes were distributed among other ten candidates. As no candidate had reached fifty percent of the valid votes, a second round was held, in which Maia was elected with 285 votes, or 61.54%, and sworn in on the same day.

== Context ==
=== Eduardo Cunha's mandate and resignation ===
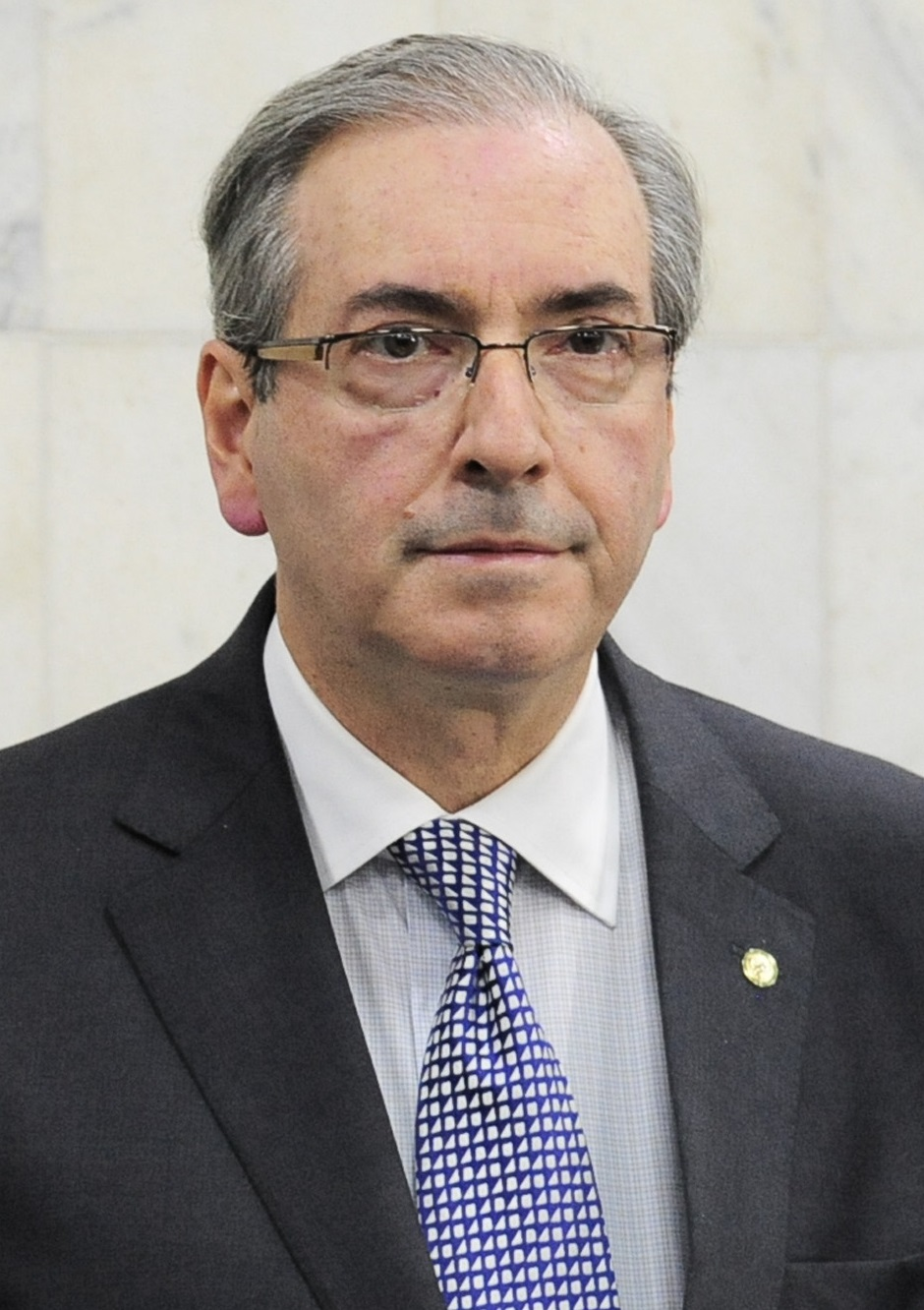
Eduardo Cunha in June 2015

Deputy Eduardo Cunha (PMDB-RJ) was elected president of the Chamber of Deputies in the first round of the election held in February 2015. During the campaign, he maintained a tone critical of the government and promised that he would maintain independence from the Executive branch, headed by President Dilma Rousseff. The government supported and helped Arlindo Chinaglia (PT-SP), who came in a distant second place. While Cunha got the support of fourteen parties, only four supported Chinaglia.

In early March 2015, Minister Teori Zavascki, of the STF, authorized the opening of an investigation against Cunha as part of Operation Car Wash. The request, sent by Prosecutor of the Republic Rodrigo Janot, argued that the deputy had benefited from the corruption scheme at Petrobras by receiving kickbacks from businessman Júlio Camargo to broker a contract for the lease of a platform vessel. Cunha called the charges "ridiculous" and considered Janot's request a "joke".

While defending himself against the accusations, Cunha did not facilitate the approval of projects of interest to the federal government. In addition, he gave a large space to the opposition in the plenary votes. In June, at the same time that the accusations of Operation Car Wash were accentuated against him, he announced that he would break with the government and, from then on, would be a member of the opposition. As justification for his decision, he accused the Planalto Palace of having articulated with Janot to incriminate him in Operation Car Wash.

In August, Cunha was one of the first parliamentarians to be the target of an indictment offered by the Prosecutor General of the Republic (Procurador-Geral da República - PGR) as a result of the investigations of Operation Car Wash. In the justification of the decision, the Attorney General Office (Advocacia-Geral da União - AGU) stated that it had evidence of criminal involvement of the politician in transactions related to Petrobras. In the following months, new evidence emerged that he kept accounts with undeclared millionaire balances in Switzerland, a fact he had personally denied in the Petrobras Parliamentary Commission of Inquiry (Comissão Parlamentar de Inquérito - CPI) in March. In mid-October, Zavascki authorized the opening of an inquiry against Cunha to investigate the legislator's alleged accounts in Switzerland, and deputies from PSOL and REDE requested the cassation of his mandate in the Ethics Council. As the basis for the request, they argued that he had violated parliamentary decorum by lying that he did not have any accounts abroad.

The cassation proceedings against Cunha were instituted in early November 2015. However, using a series of appeals and maneuvers, he managed to delay the proceedings. These maneuvers led Janot to ask the STF for Cunha's removal from office, alleging that the congressman used his power and mandate for illicit purposes, including to obstruct criminal investigations.

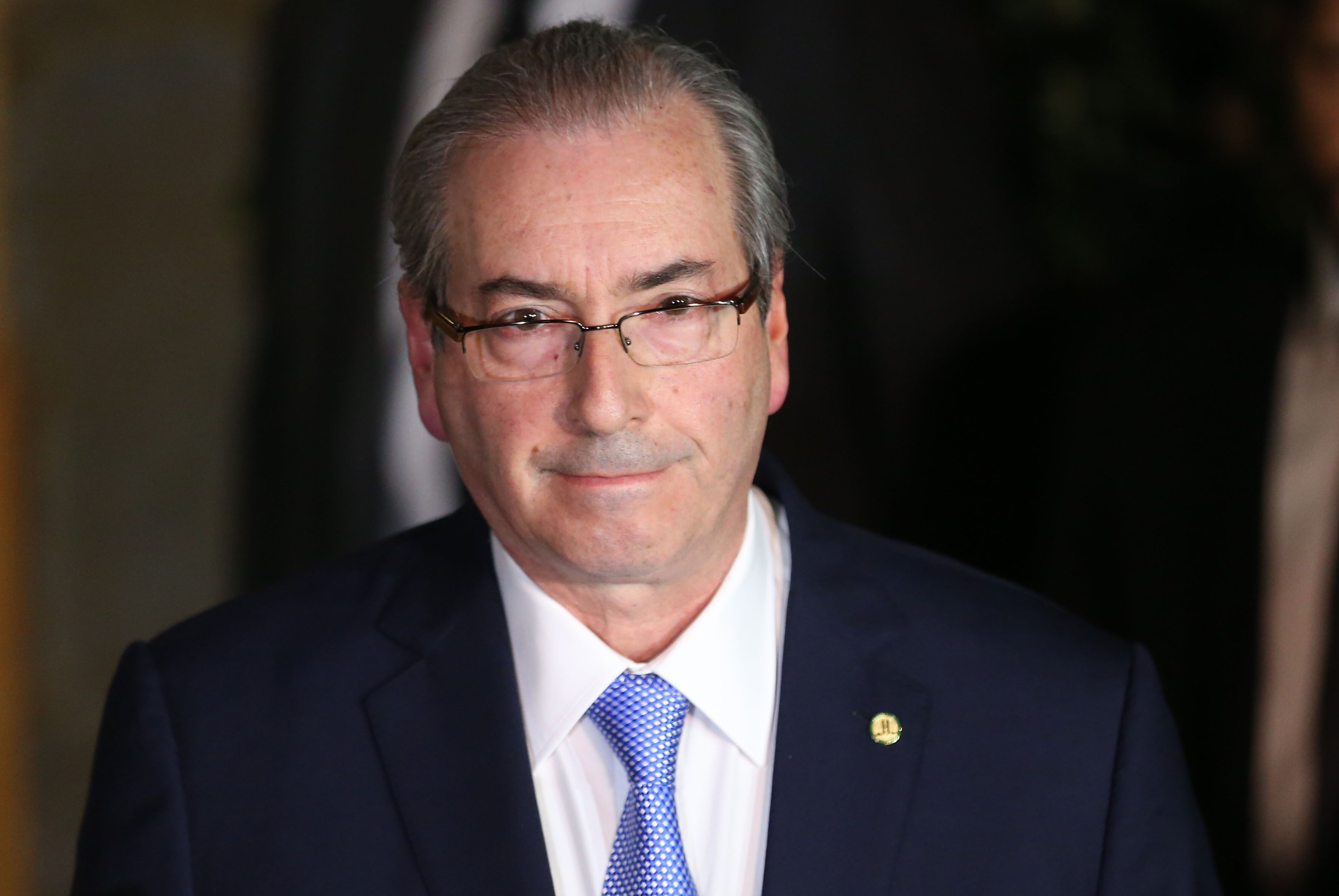
Cunha on the night he was removed from office by the STF on May 5, 2016

On December 2, Cunha accepted the opening of impeachment proceedings against Dilma. The acceptance occurred shortly after the PT supporters announced their support for the loss of her mandate, which caused some to consider this an act of revenge. There were also rumors about attempts at an agreement between Cunha and Dilma, in which he would deny admissibility, while the PT supporters would save her mandate in the Ethics Council; both denied the existence of such an agreement. As the process against her advanced with Cunha's support, he gained time and managed to prevent the progress of the impeachment request against him.

In early March 2016, Cunha became the first parliamentarian defendant in Car Wash. Unanimously, the STF found that there was evidence that he had demanded and received bribes. A month later, Cunha led the vote that approved the continuation of Rousseff's impeachment. Breaking the tradition of neutrality of his office, he voted in favor of the request and was the target of numerous criticisms and praises. In the same month, Zavascki authorized the opening of two more investigations against the parliamentarian, both related to suspicions of receiving undue advantages, which his defense denied, as well as claimed that the Swiss accounts were trusts.

On May 5, Zavascki granted a request by Janot and removed Cunha from his duties as federal deputy and president of the Chamber indefinitely - this historic decision was referenced by all STF justices on the same day, who classified it as an exceptional measure. In a press conference, Cunha denied that he would resign and claimed that he was suffering retaliation for the impeachment process. With the STF's decision, there were requests from deputies from various parties for the Chamber to choose a new president. However, deputy Waldir Maranhão (PP-MA) ran the House while Cunha was away. Maranhão was unable to stand up to his other colleagues and isolated himself after his failed attempt to overturn the vote that approved the admissibility of Rousseff's impeachment - although he reversed his decision a few hours later.

On June 14, a few days after the PGR denounced Cunha for the third time to the STF, the Ethics Council approved by eleven to nine the opinion of congressman Marcos Rogério (DEM-RO) recommending Cunha's cassation. On July 7, he announced his resignation as president of the Chamber, although he had stated that he would not do so. Cunha was the first president to resign in the middle of a Congressional term since Severino Cavalcanti in 2005. His decision was influenced by the progress of Operation Car Wash and the inclusion of family members in the allegations. In addition, he also calculated that he would have a better chance of avoiding his impeachment as deputy if he resigned as president. After his departure, he was described as the "most powerful president of the Chamber in recent decades" (Veja) and "the most powerful Chamber president since Ulysses Guimarães" (Época). On the other hand, Cunha was unpopular among public opinion, which mostly defended his resignation (76%) or impeachment (78%).

=== Importance and benefits of the position ===
The position was strategic for the country, since the president of the Chamber is the second in line of succession to the Presidency of the Republic. Among his attributions are the power to decide on the opening of impeachment petitions against the President of the Republic, the definition of the agenda of propositions that will be deliberated in the plenary, the admissibility of CPI, the indication of the chairmen and rapporteurs of the commissions that analyze Constitutional Amendment (Emendas Constitucionais - EC) proposals, the administration of an annual budget of 5.2 billion reais, and the leadership of 3.2 thousand civil servants. The incumbent also sits on the National Defense Council and the Council of the Republic.

The function of defining the agenda of the House is the most powerful prerogative that the president of the Chamber has. Although the leaders of the parties are usually consulted about the voting priorities, the parliamentarian can decide on his or her own which topics will or will not go to deliberation in plenary. Therefore, projects of interest to the federal executive branch are only put on the agenda with the endorsement of the incumbent; consequently, he can put on the agenda projects that go against the interests of the presidency, such as the creation of billionaire expenses.

Among the benefits of the position is the fact that its occupant has a residence located on the shores of Paranoá Lake, which has several employees paid by the state, official cars, security apparatus, flights in jets of the Brazilian Air Force (Força Aérea Brasileira - FAB) and an annual budget of 4.2 million reais directed to the payment of employees' salaries.

== Candidates ==
=== Registered ===
The following deputies have officially registered their candidacies:

- Carlos Gaguim, (PTN), Federal Deputy for Tocantins (since 2015), Governor of Tocantins (2009–2011), State Deputy for Tocantins (1999–2009), and City Councilor in Palmas (1993–1999).
- Carlos Manato, (SD), Federal Deputy for Espírito Santo (since 2003).
- Cristiane Brasil, (PTB), Federal Deputy for Rio de Janeiro (since 2015) and City Councilor in Rio de Janeiro (2005–2015).
- Esperidião Amin, (PP), Federal Deputy for Santa Catarina (since 2011), Governor of Santa Catarina (1999–2003; 1983–1987), Senator for Santa Catarina (1991–1999) and Mayor of Florianópolis (1989–1990; 1975–1978).
- Evair de Melo, (PV), Federal Deputy for Espírito Santo (since 2015).
- Fábio Ramalho, (PMDB), Federal Deputy for Minas Gerais (since 2007) and Mayor of Malacacheta (1997–2004).
- Fernando Giacobo, (PR), Federal Deputy for Paraná (since 2003).
- Luiza Erundina, (PSOL), Federal Deputy for São Paulo (since 1999), Minister of Federal Administration (1993), Mayor of São Paulo (1989–1993), State Deputy of São Paulo (1987–1988), and City Councilor of São Paulo (1983–1986).
- Marcelo Castro, (PMDB), Federal Deputy for Piauí (since 1999), Minister of Health (2015–2016) and State Deputy of Piauí (1983–1995).
- Miro Teixeira, (REDE), Federal Deputy for Rio de Janeiro (since 1987; 1971–1983) and Ministry of Communications (2003–2004).
- Rodrigo Maia, (DEM), Federal Deputy for Rio de Janeiro (since 1999) and Secretary of Government of Rio de Janeiro's City Hall (1997–1998).
- Rogério Rosso, (PSD), Federal Deputy for the Federal District (since 2015) and Governor of the Federal District (2010–2011).
- Orlando Silva, (PCdoB), Federal Deputy for São Paulo (since 2015), City Councilor of São Paulo (2013–2015), Minister of Sports (2006–2011), and President of the National Union of Students (1995–1997).
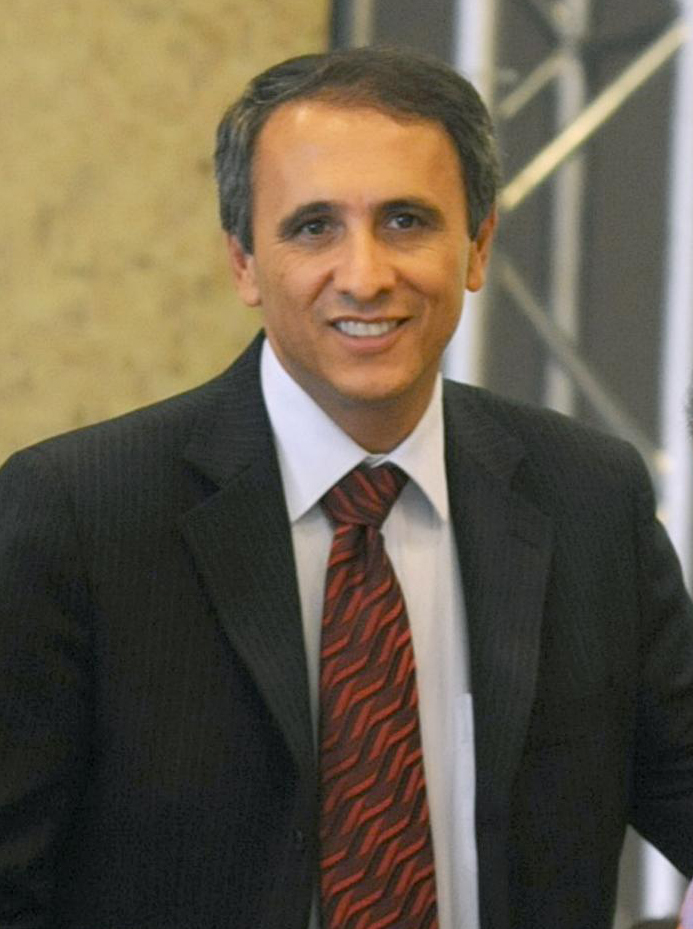
Carlos Gaguim (PTN) of Tocantins

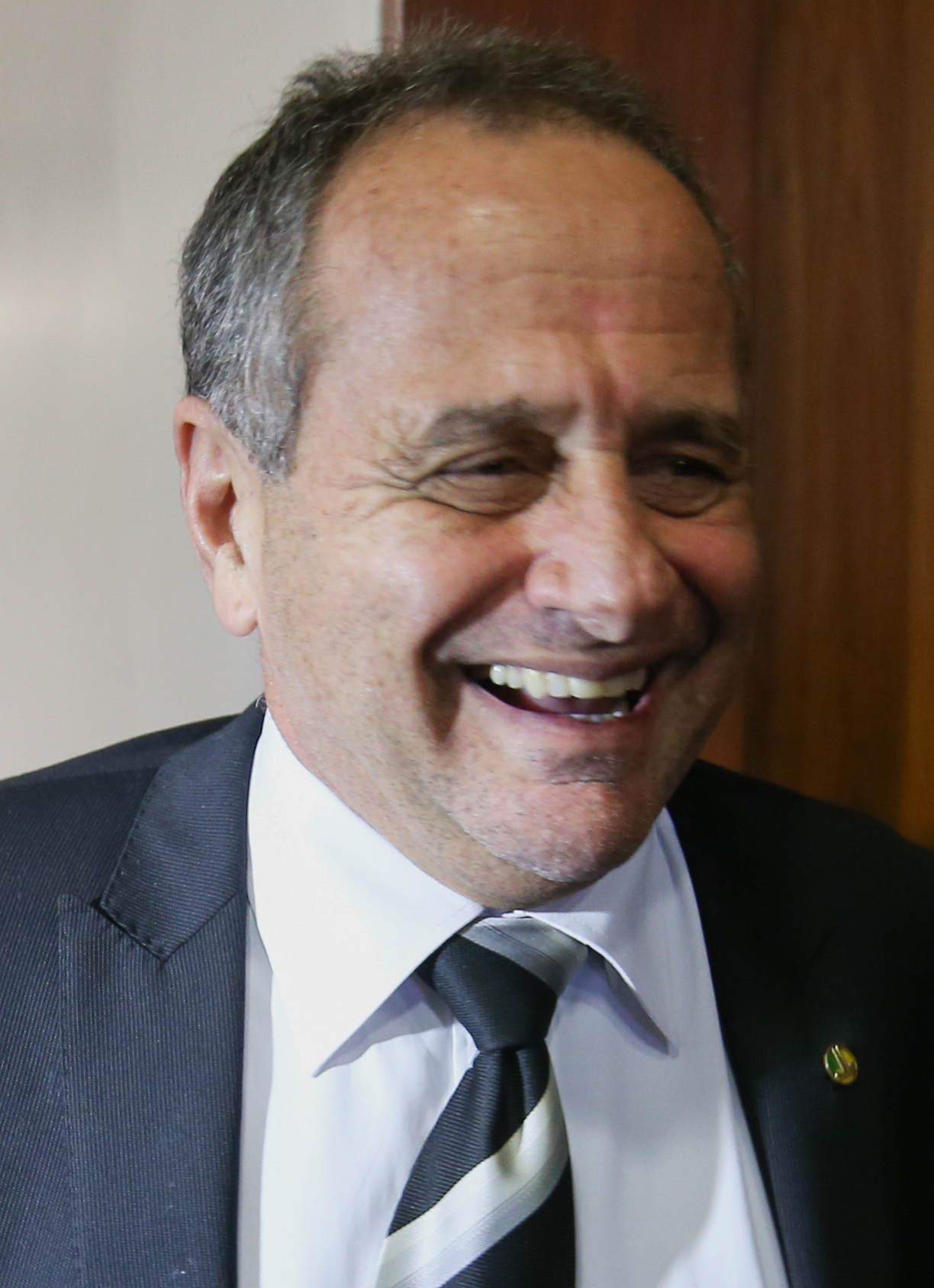
Carlos Manato (SD) of Espirito Santo

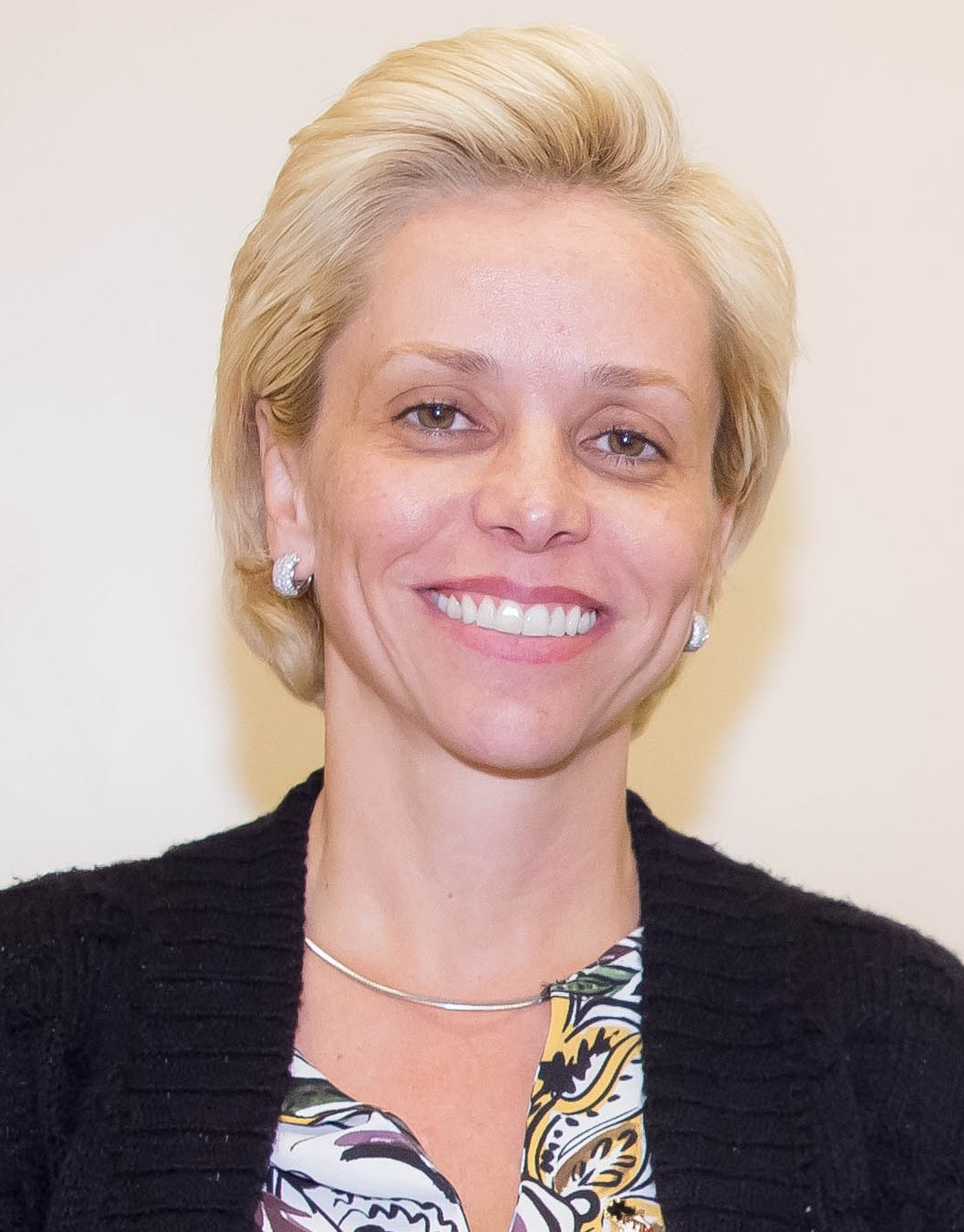
Cristiane Brasil (PTB) of Rio de Janeiro

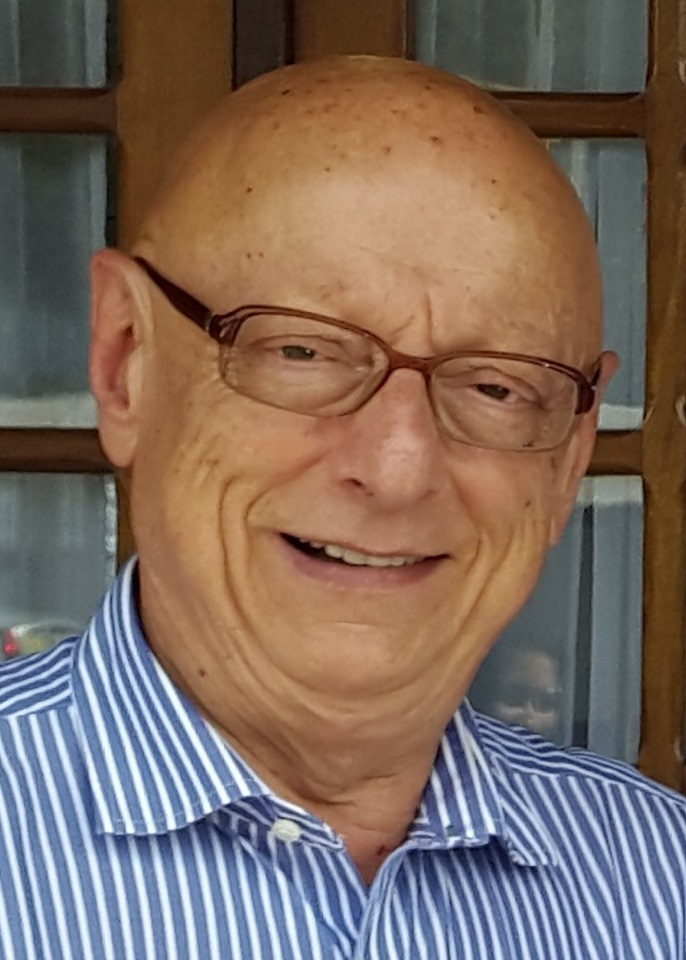
Esperidião Amin (PP) of Santa Catarina

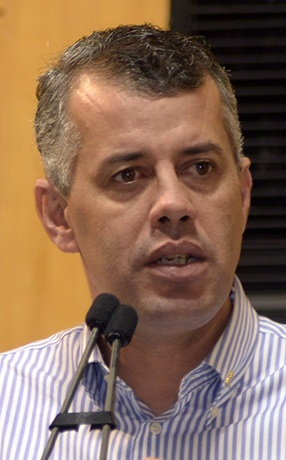
Evair de Melo (PV) of Espírito Santo

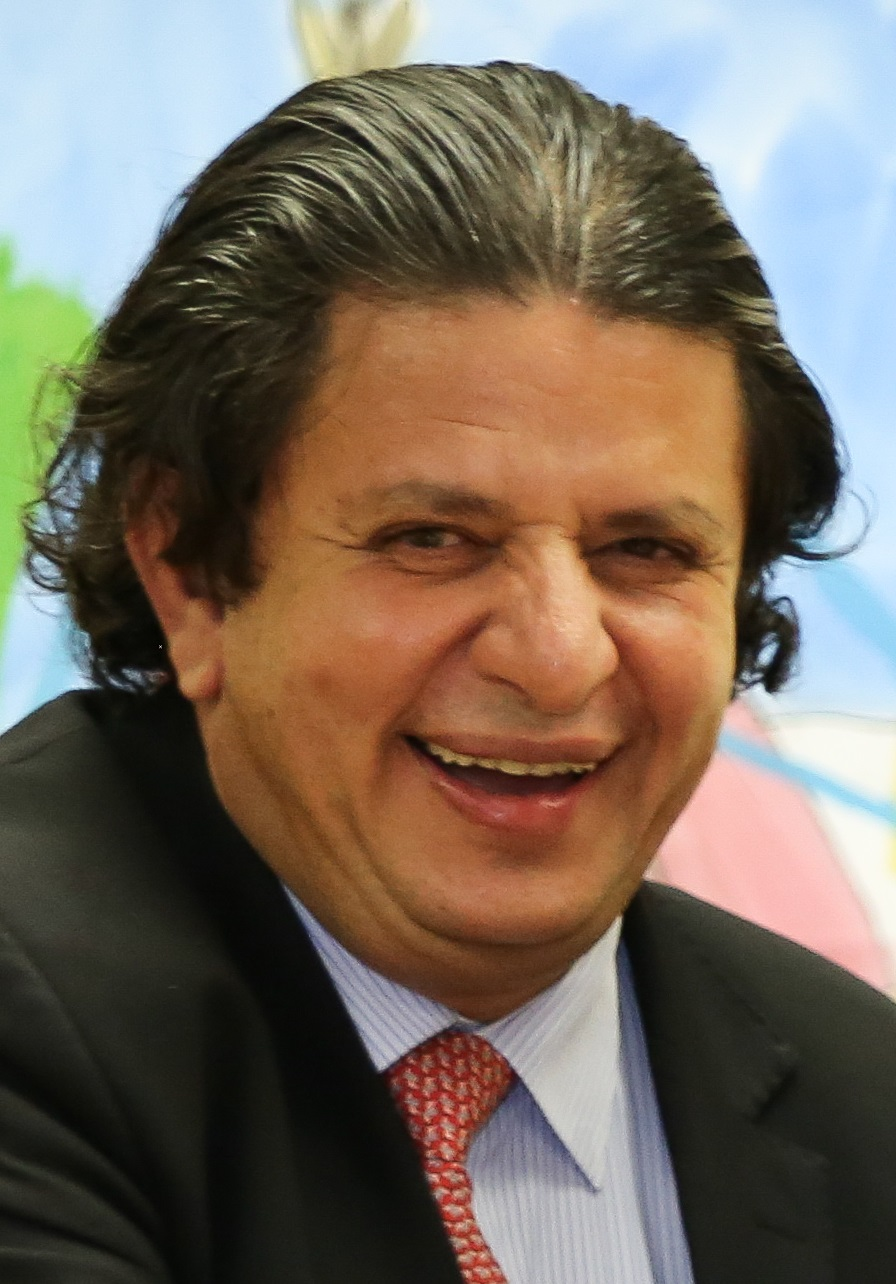
Fábio Ramalho (PMDB) of Minas Gerais

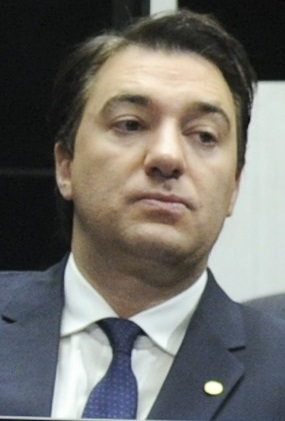
Fernando Giacobo (PR) of Paraná

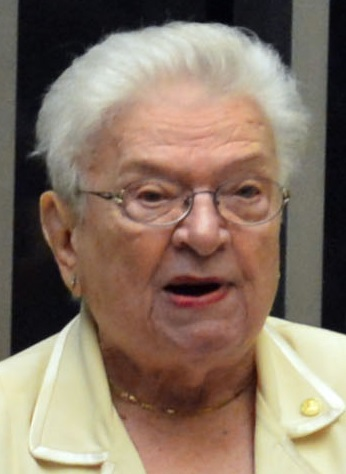
Luiza Erundina (PSOL) of São Paulo

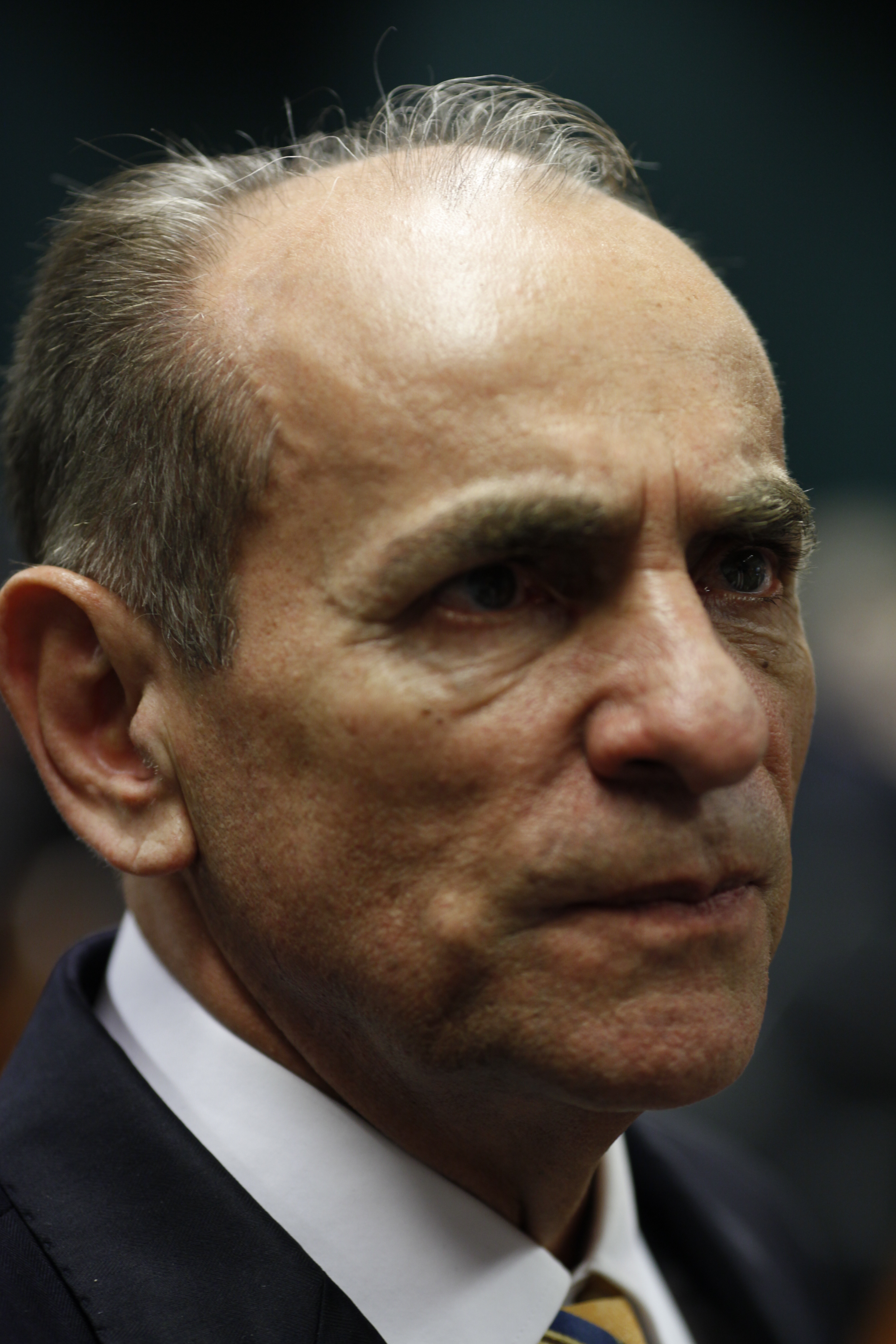
Marcelo Castro (PMDB) of Piauí

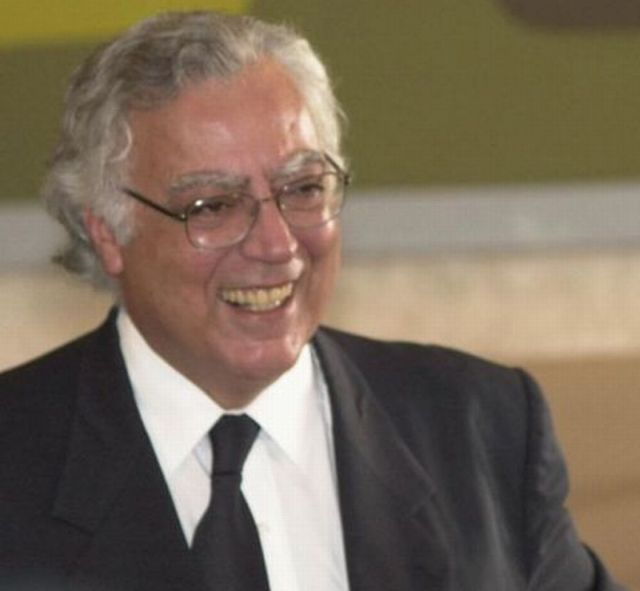
Miro Teixeira (REDE) of Rio de Janeiro

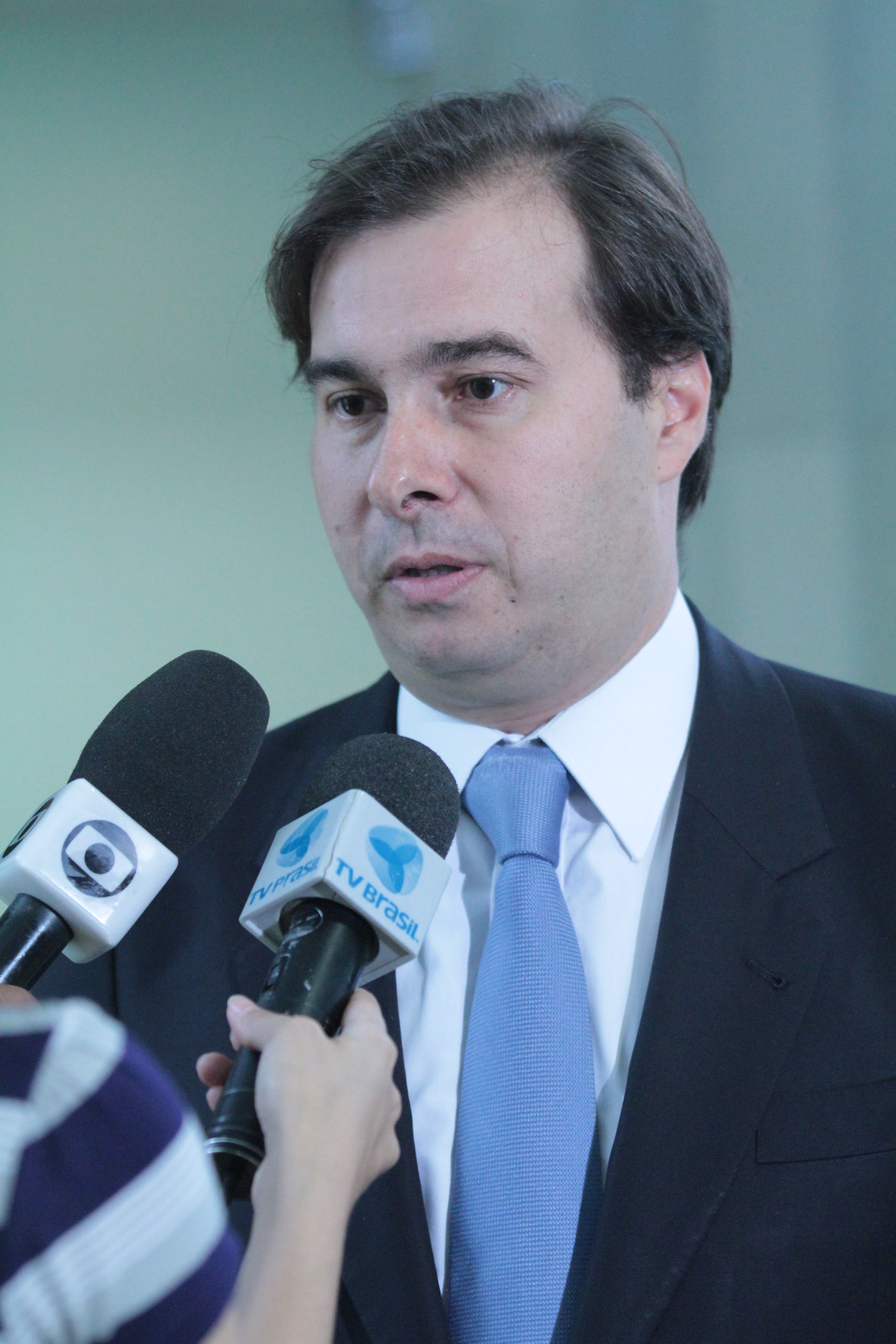
Rodrigo Maia (DEM) of Rio de Janeiro

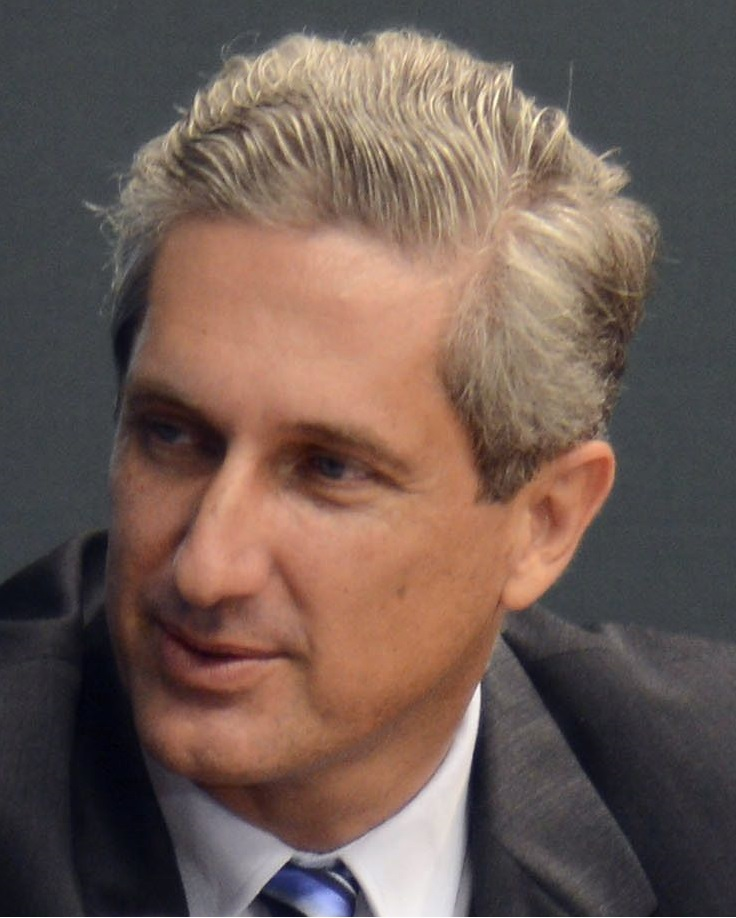
Rogério Rosso (PSD) of the Federal District

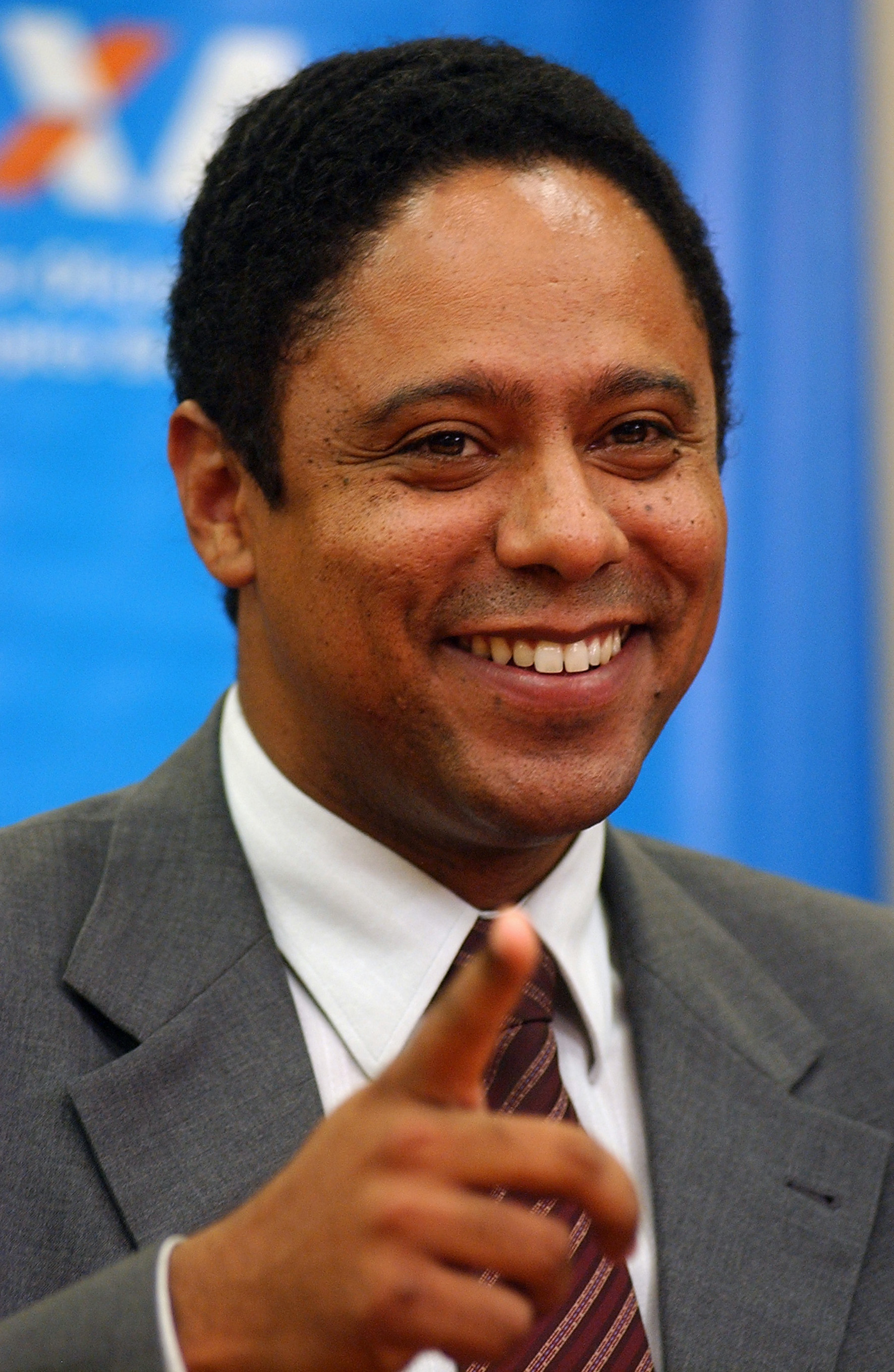
Orlando Silva (PC do B) of São Paulo

=== Dropouts ===
The following deputies announced their candidacy, but eventually dropped out:

- Beto Mansur, (PRB), Federal Deputy for São Paulo (since 2015; 1991–1997), Mayor of Santos (1997–2004) and City Councilor of Santos (1989–1991).
- Fausto Pinato, (PP), Federal Deputy for São Paulo (since 2015).
- Gilberto Nascimento, (PSC), Federal Deputy for São Paulo (since 2015), State Deputy for São Paulo (1993–2003) and City Councilman for São Paulo (1983–1992).
- Heráclito Fortes, (PSB), Federal Deputy for Piauí (since 2015; 1995–2003; 1982–1989), Senator for Piauí (2003–2011) and Mayor of Teresina (1989–1992).
- Júlio Delgado, (PSB), Federal Deputy for Minas Gerais (since 2003; 1999–2000).
- Maria do Rosário, (PT), Federal Deputy for Rio Grande do Sul (since 2003), Minister of the Special Secretariat for Human Rights (2011–2014), State Deputy for Rio Grande do Sul (1999–2003), and City Councilor of Porto Alegre (1993–1998).
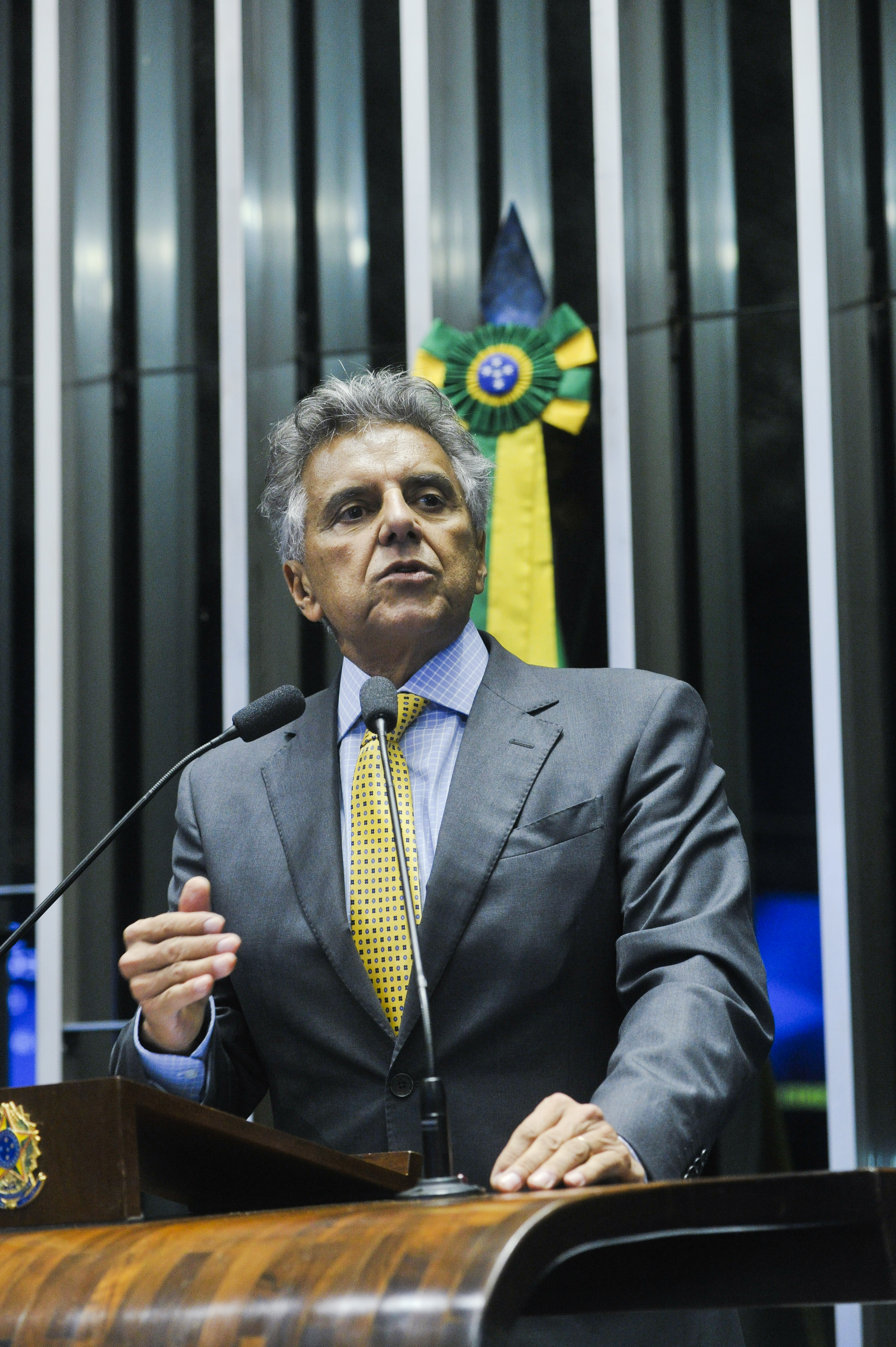
Beto Mansur (PRB) of São Paulo

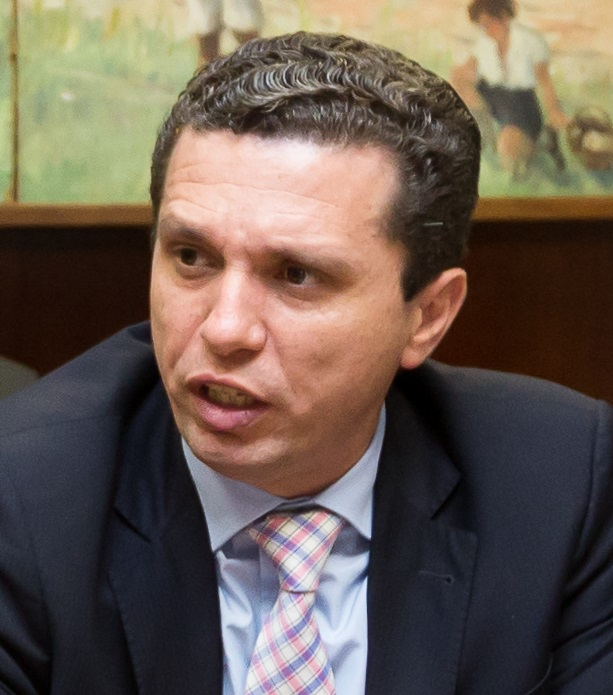
Fausto Pinato (PP) of São Paulo

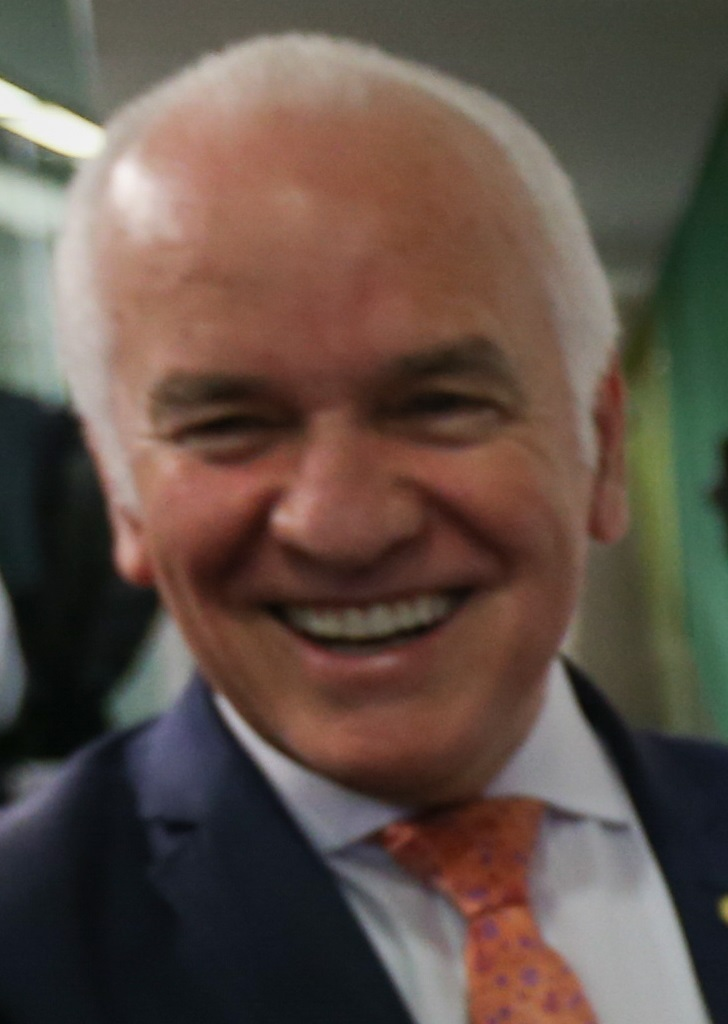
Gilberto Nascimento (PSC) of São Paulo

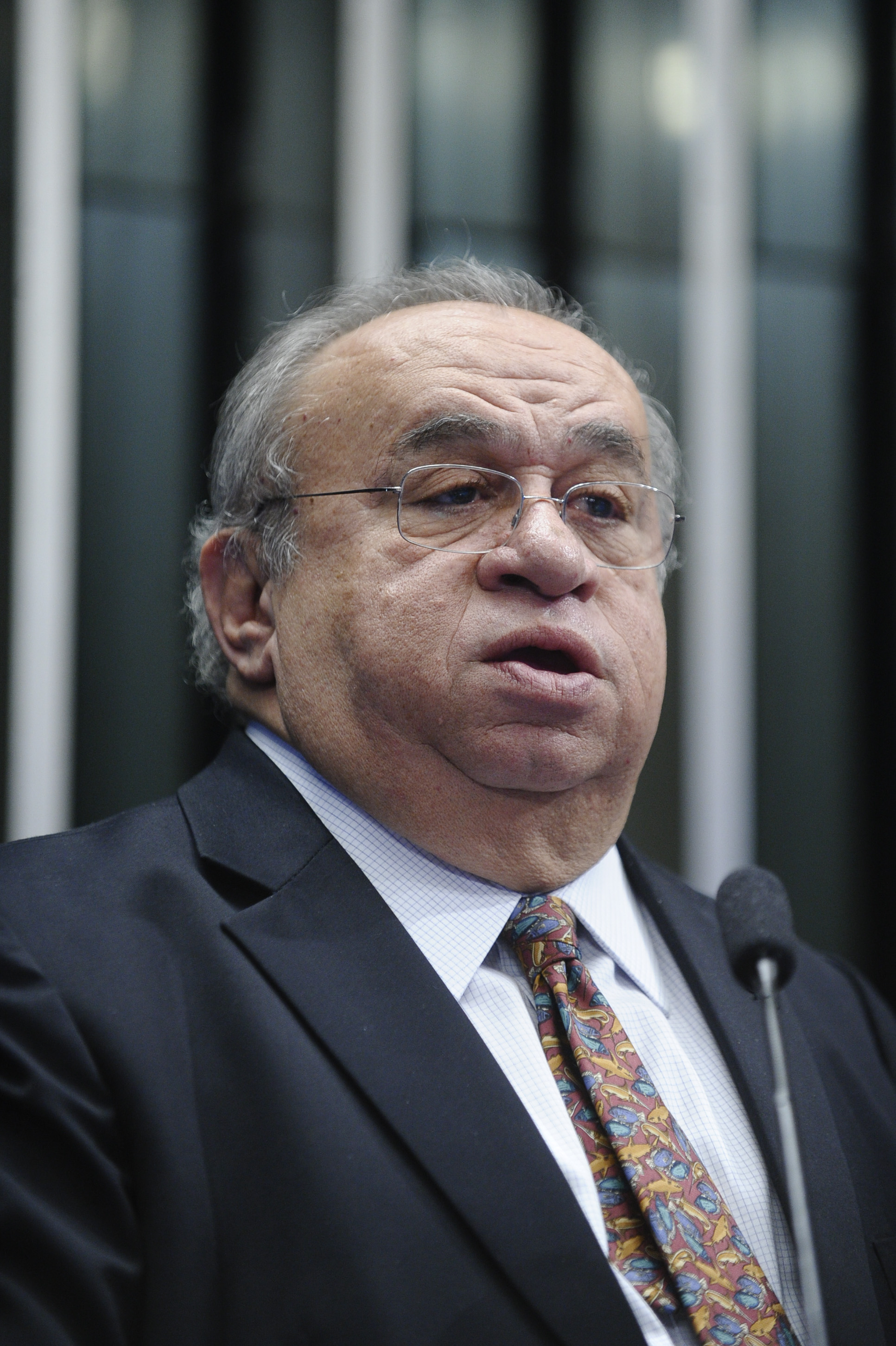
Heráclito Fortes (PSB) of Piauí

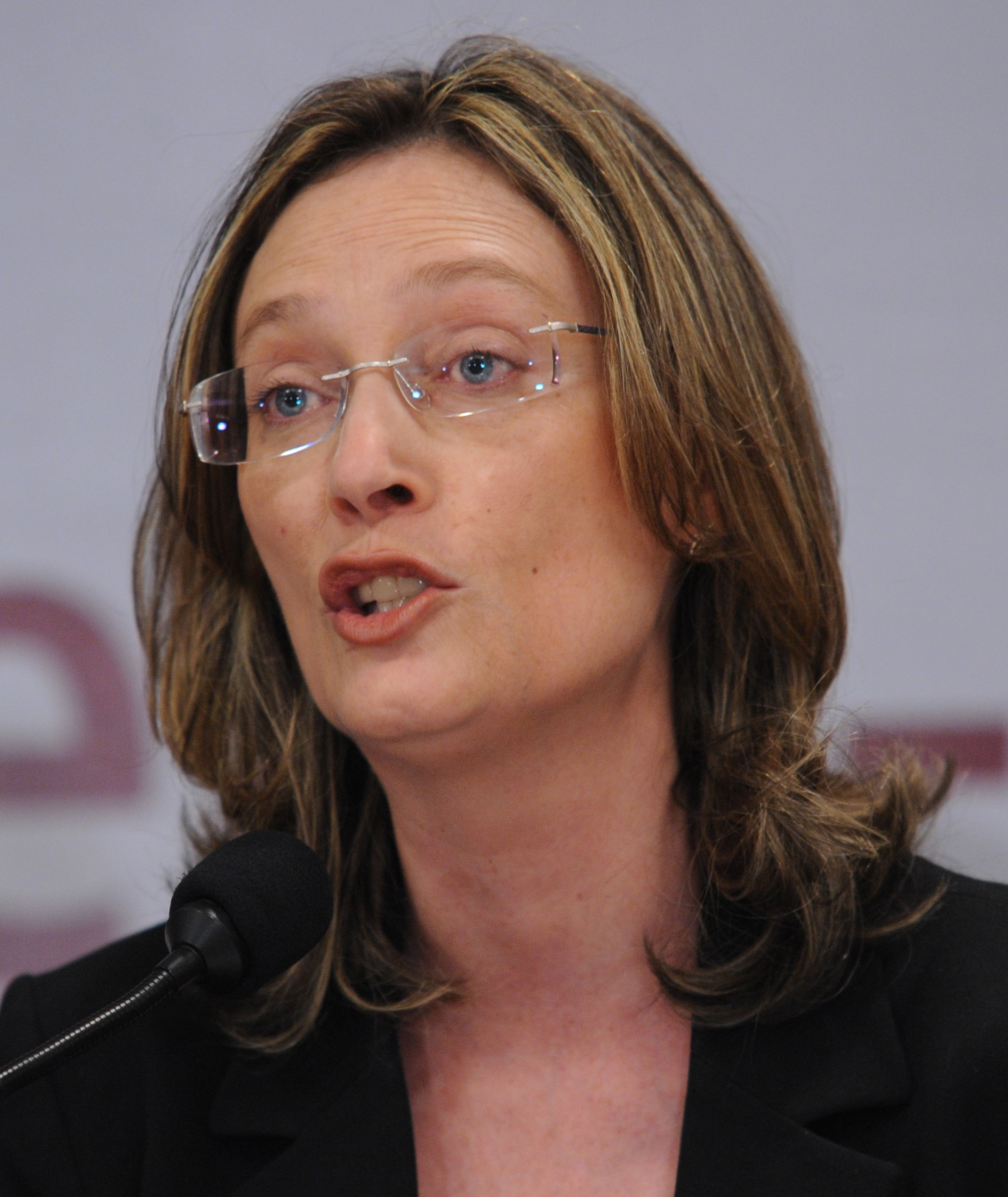
Maria do Rosário (PT) of Rio Grande do Sul

== Election ==
Waldir Maranhão scheduled the election for July 14, a Wednesday. Registration for candidacies closed at noon on election day. Any of the 513 deputies could run, even if they did not have the support of their party. Candidates had up to one hour before the first round to withdraw. Initially, the first round of voting was to be held at 4 p.m., but ended up being held at 5:30 p.m. To be elected in the first round, a candidate had to obtain fifty percent of the votes, and the presence of at least half of the deputies was required. Voting in the first and second round was conducted in fourteen electronic ballot boxes, with a secret ballot.

Rodrigo Maia got the official support of the PSDB, DEM, PPS, and PSB. Rogério Rosso, a close ally of Cunha, had the support of the "centrão", an informal block that brought together center-right parliamentarians, including PP, PSD, PR, PRB, PSC and PTB.

In the second round, the first candidate gained the support of PDT, PCdoB, PR, and PTN, as well as the vote of some PT congressmen and other left-wing parties, who wanted to avoid Rosso's victory. Maia and Rosso had voted in favor of Rousseff's impeachment and belonged to the ruling base, as well as pleasing the Michel Temer government. Even though they were from the PMDB, the candidacy of Castro, who voted against Rousseff's impeachment and was Minister of Health during Rousseff's second term, angered the Temer government. Because there were chances of Castro going to the second round, the government acted so that the two most voted were Maia and Rosso.

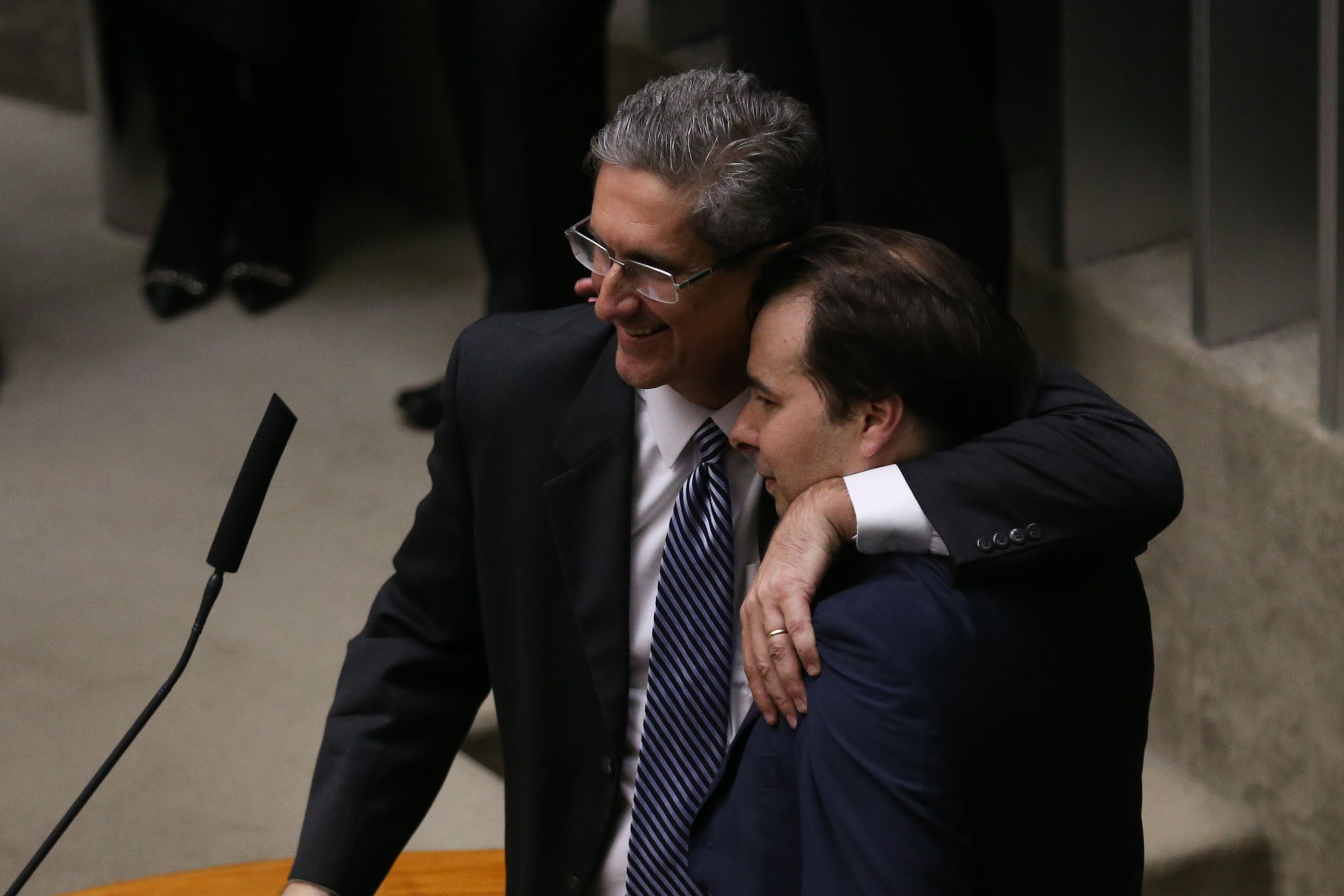
Rogério Rosso and Rodrigo Maia celebrate their classification to the second round of the election

On the second round, Maia received 285 votes, against 170 for Rosso. The victory of the deputy from Rio de Janeiro was considered an "anti-Cunha reaction." He was sworn in the same night of the vote for a term that would end in early February 2017.

=== First and second rounds ===
| Candidate | Party | First round | | Second round | |
| Candidate | Party | Votes | % | Votes | % |
|---|---|---|---|---|---|
| Rodrigo Maia (RJ) ✓ | DEM | 120 | 24.29 | 285 | 62.64 |
| Rogério Rosso (DF) | PSD | 106 | 21.46 | 170 | 37.36 |
| Marcelo Castro (PI) | PMDB | 70 | 14.17 | | |
| Fernando Giacobo (PR) | PR | 59 | 11.94 | | |
| Esperidião Amin (SC) | PP | 36 | 7.29 | | |
| Luiza Erundina (SP) | PSOL | 22 | 4.45 | | |
| Fábio Ramalho (MG) | PMDB | 18 | 3.64 | | |
| Orlando Silva (SP) | PCdoB | 16 | 3.24 | | |
| Cristiane Brasil (RJ) | PTB | 13 | 2.63 | | |
| Carlos Henrique Gaguim (TO) | PTN | 13 | 2.63 | | |
| Carlos Manato (ES) | SD | 10 | 2.02 | | |
| Miro Teixeira (RJ) | REDE | 6 | 1.21 | | |
| Evair de Mello (ES) | PV | 5 | 1.01 | | |
| Total | | 494 | 100.00 | 455 | 100.00 |
| Valid votes | | 494 | 100.00 | 455 | 98.91 |
| Invalid/blank votes | | 0 | 0.00 | 5 | 1.09 |
| Total votes | | 494 | 100.00 | 460 | 100.00 |
| Registered voters/turnout | | 513 | 96.30 | 513 | 89.67 |

=== See also ===
- President of the Brazilian Chamber of Deputies
- Eduardo Cunha
- Rodrigo Maia
- Operation Car Wash
- 2015 President of the Chamber of Deputies of Brazil election
- 2017 President of the Chamber of Deputies of Brazil election
- 55th Legislature of the National Congress
