= 2015 President of the Chamber of Deputies of Brazil election =

- 1 February 2015

Needed to Win: Majority of the votes cast 513 votes cast, 257 needed for a majority
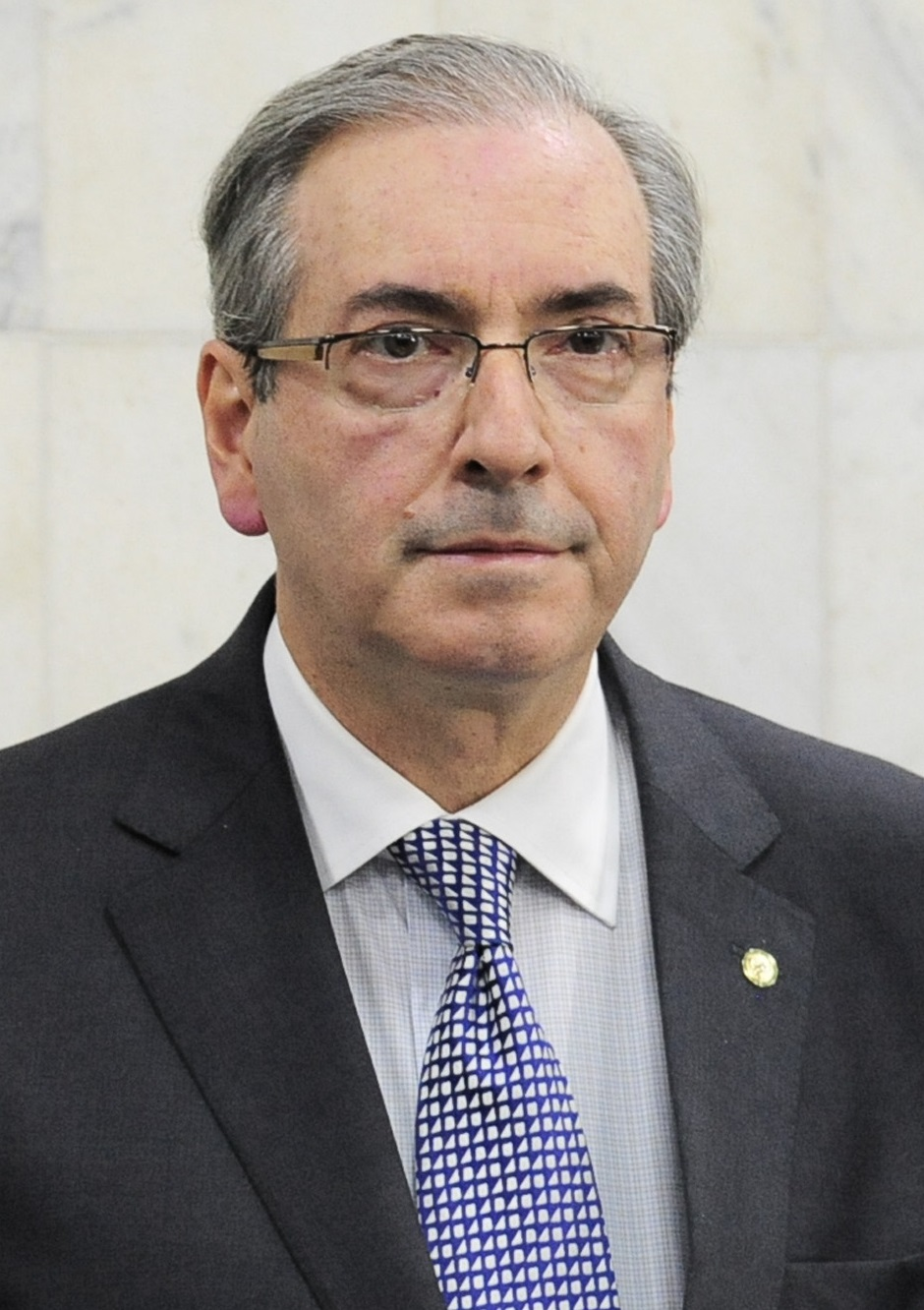

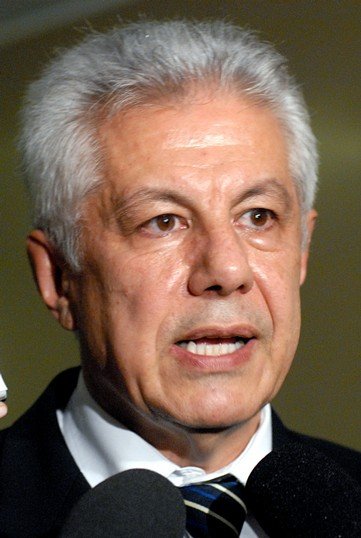

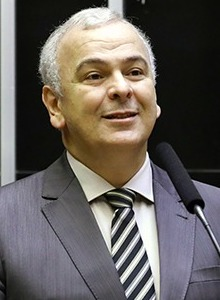

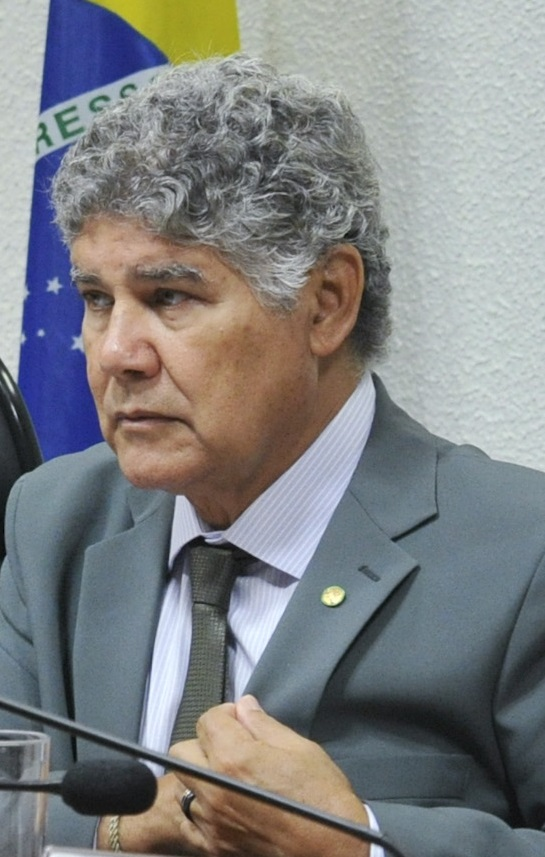
	Majority party	Third party
Candidate	Eduardo Cunha	Arlindo Chinaglia
Party	MDB	PT
Leader's seat	Rio de Janeiro	São Paulo
Members' vote	267	136
	Fourth party	Sixth party
Candidate	Júlio Delgado	Chico Alencar
Party	PSB	PSOL
Leader's seat	Minas Gerais	Rio de Janeiro
Members' vote	100	8
President before election
Henrique Eduardo Alves
PMDB
Elected President
Eduardo Cunha
PMDB

The 2015 President of the Chamber of Deputies of Brazil election took place on 1 February 2015, following the opening of the 55th Legislature of the National Congress. President Henrique Eduardo Alves (PMDB-RN) wasn't reelect federal deputy, but his caucus mate, Eduardo Cunha (PMDB-RJ), was chosen as the party's candidate. Cunha received 267 votes, over the majority of the Chamber, to become its president. PT leader Arlindo Chinaglia (PT-SP) garnered 136, and 100 votes to Júlio Delgado (PSB-MG), 8 to Chico Alencar (PSOL-RJ), and 2 blank votes.

Deputy Miro Teixeira (PROS-RJ) presided the session and sworned in all the 513 deputies and the elect President of the Chamber.

== Formal voting ==
=== President ===
Candidate	Party	Votes	%
Eduardo Cunha (RJ) ✓	PMDB	267	52.25
Arlindo Chinaglia (SP)	PT	136	26.61
Júlio Delgado (MG)	PSB	100	19.57
Chico Alencar (RJ)	PSOL	8	1.57
Total		511	100.00
Valid votes		511	99.61
Invalid/blank votes		2	0.39
Total votes		513	100.00
Registered voters/turnout		513	100.00

=== First Vice President ===
Candidate	Party	Votes	%
Waldir Maranhão (MA) ✓	PP	428	100.00
Total		428	100.00
Valid votes		428	83.43
Invalid/blank votes		85	16.57
Total votes		513	100.00
Registered voters/turnout		513	100.00

=== Second Vice President ===
Candidate	Party	Votes	%
Fernando Giacobo (PR) ✓	PR	322	67.08
Lúcio Vale (PA)	PR	158	32.92
Total		480	100.00
Valid votes		480	93.57
Invalid/blank votes		33	6.43
Total votes		513	100.00
Registered voters/turnout		513	100.00

=== First Secretary ===
Candidate	Party	Votes	%
Beto Mansur (SP) ✓	PRB	436	100.00
Total		436	100.00
Valid votes		436	84.99
Invalid/blank votes		77	15.01
Total votes		513	100.00
Registered voters/turnout		513	100.00

=== Second Secretary ===
Candidate	Party	Votes	%
Felipe Bornier (RJ) ✓	PSD	437	100.00
Total		437	100.00
Valid votes		437	85.19
Invalid/blank votes		76	14.81
Total votes		513	100.00
Registered voters/turnout		513	100.00

=== Third Secretary ===
Candidate	Party	Votes	%
Mara Gabrilli (SP) ✓	PSDB	456	100.00
Total		456	100.00
Valid votes		456	88.89
Invalid/blank votes		57	11.11
Total votes		513	100.00
Registered voters/turnout		513	100.00

=== Fourth Secretary ===
Candidate	Party	Votes	%
Alex Canziani (PR) ✓	PTB	457	100.00
Total		457	100.00
Valid votes		457	89.08
Invalid/blank votes		56	10.92
Total votes		513	100.00
Registered voters/turnout		513	100.00
