= 2017 President of the Chamber of Deputies of Brazil election =

- 2 February 2017

Needed to Win: Majority of the votes cast 504 votes cast, 253 needed for a majority
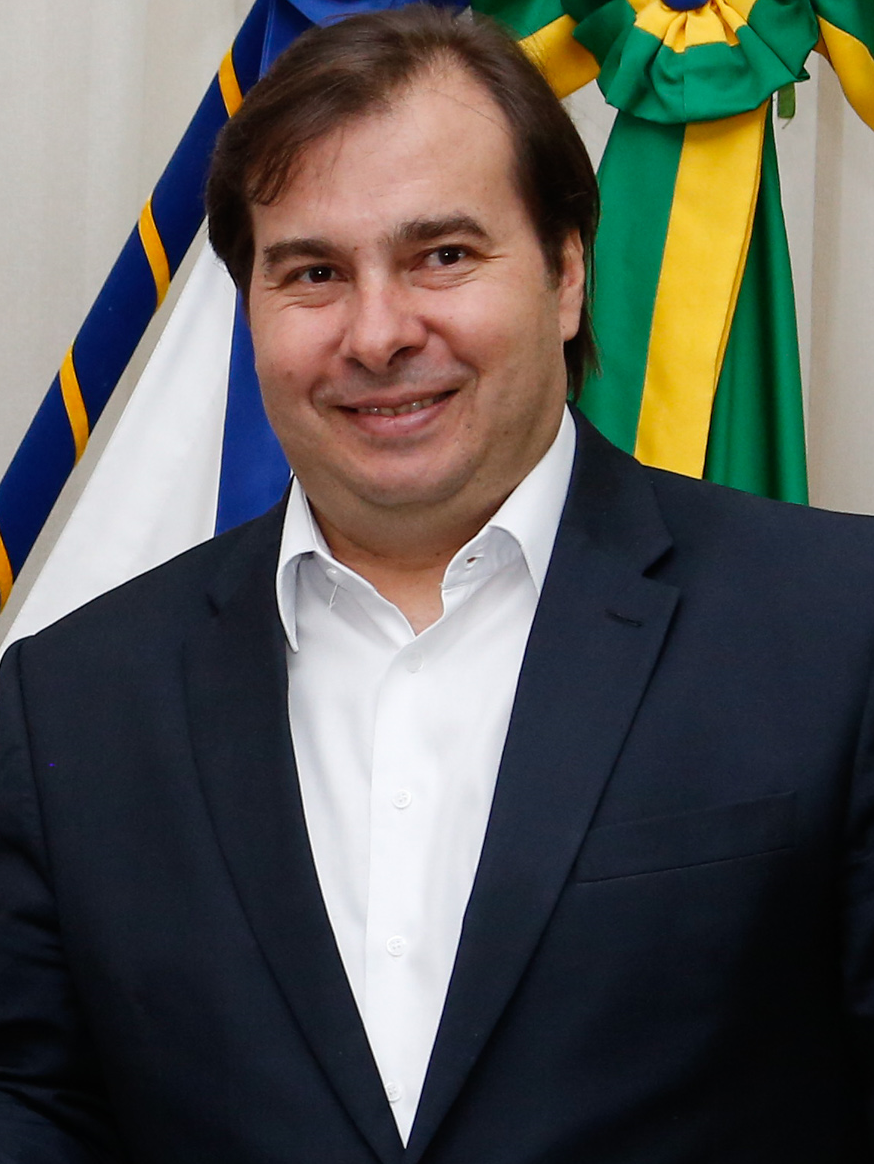

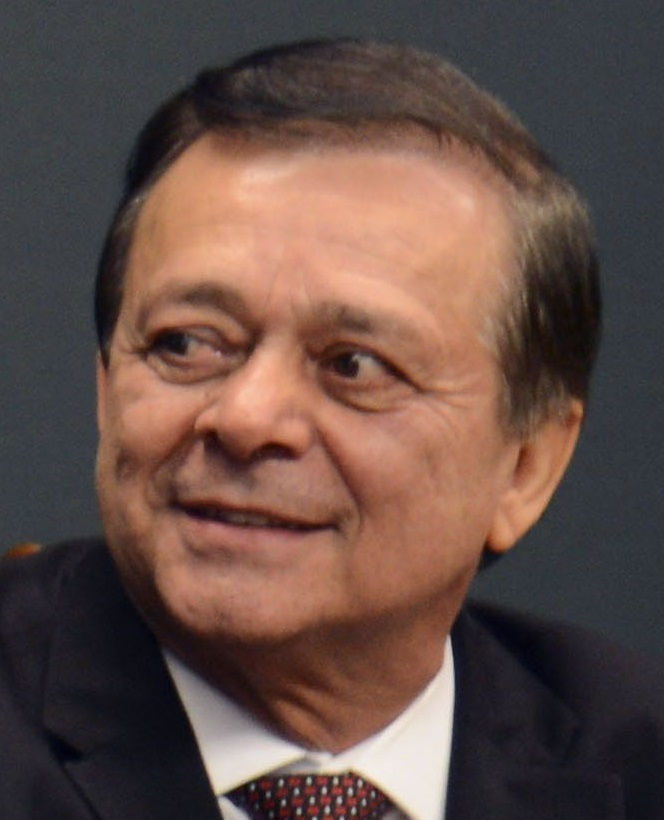

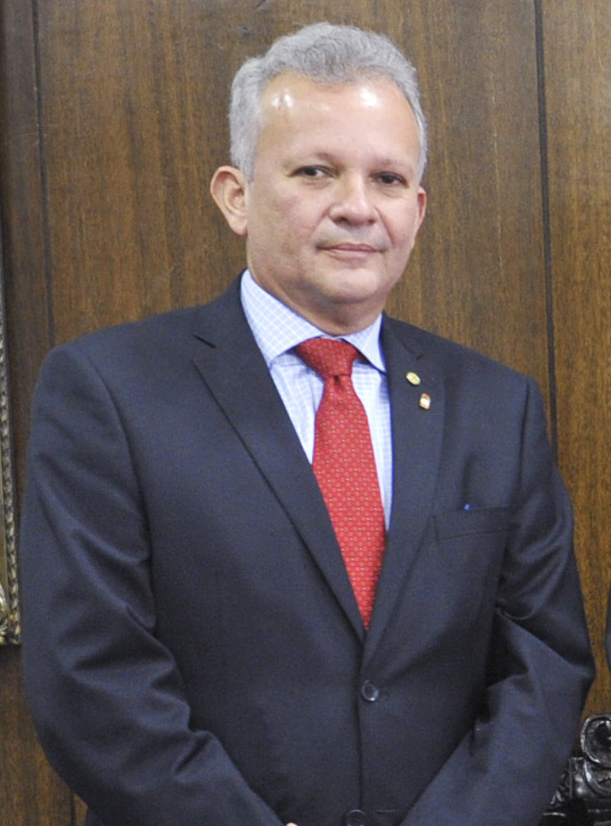

	Majority party	Minority party	Third party
Candidate	Rodrigo Maia	Jovair Arantes	André Figueiredo
Party	DEM	PTB	PDT
Leader's seat	Rio de Janeiro	Goiás	Ceará
Members' vote	293	105	59
Candidate	Others
Members' vote	42
President before election
Rodrigo Maia
DEM
Elected President
Rodrigo Maia
DEM

The 2017 President of the Chamber of Deputies of Brazil election took place on 2 February 2017, following the opening of the 3rd session of the 55th Legislature of the National Congress. Incumbent President Rodrigo Maia (DEM-RJ) received 293 votes, way over the majority of the chamber, to become its President. PTB leader Jovair Arantes (PTB-GO) garnered 105 votes, with 106 more going to other candidates (59 to André Figueiredo, 28 to Júlio Delgado, 10 to Luiza Erundina, 4 to Jair Bolsonaro, and 5 blank votes). As only 504 deputies in the 513-member Chamber cast a vote (due to absentees or members present but not voting), 253 votes were necessary to win.

== Formal voting ==
=== President ===
Candidate	Party	Votes	%
Rodrigo Maia (RJ) ✓	DEM	293	58.72
Jovair Arantes (GO)	PTB	105	21.04
André Figueiredo (CE)	PDT	59	11.82
Júlio Delgado (MG)	PSB	28	5.61
Luiza Erundina (SP)	PSOL	10	2.00
Jair Bolsonaro (RJ)	PSC	4	0.80
Total		499	100.00
Valid votes		499	99.01
Invalid/blank votes		5	0.99
Total votes		504	100.00
Registered voters/turnout		513	98.25

=== First Vice President ===
Candidate	Party	First round		Second round	
Candidate	Party	Votes	%	Votes	%
Fábio Ramalho (MG) ✓	PMDB	192	40.08	265	56.50
Osmar Serraglio (PR)	PMDB	154	32.15	204	43.50
Lúcio Vieira Lima (BA)	PMDB	133	27.77		
Total		479	100.00	469	100.00
Valid votes		479	95.04	469	98.32
Invalid/blank votes		25	4.96	8	1.68
Total votes		504	100.00	477	100.00
Registered voters/turnout		513	98.25	513	92.98

=== Second Vice President ===
Candidate	Party	Votes	%
André Fufuca (MA) ✓	PP	283	63.03
Eduardo da Fonte (PE)	PP	166	36.97
Total		449	100.00
Valid votes		449	89.09
Invalid/blank votes		55	10.91
Total votes		504	100.00
Registered voters/turnout		513	98.25

=== First Secretary ===
Candidate	Party	Votes	%
Fernando Giacobo (PR) ✓	PR	406	100.00
Total		406	100.00
Valid votes		406	80.56
Invalid/blank votes		98	19.44
Total votes		504	100.00
Registered voters/turnout		513	98.25

=== Second Secretary ===
Candidate	Party	Votes	%
Mariana Carvalho (RO) ✓	PSDB	416	100.00
Total		416	100.00
Valid votes		416	82.54
Invalid/blank votes		88	17.46
Total votes		504	100.00
Registered voters/turnout		513	98.25

=== Third Secretary ===
Candidate	Party	First round		Second round	
Candidate	Party	Votes	%	Votes	%
João Henrique Caldas (AL) ✓	PSB	248	53.10	240	52.17
João Fernando Coutinho (PE)	PSB	219	46.90	220	47.83
Total		467	100.00	460	100.00
Valid votes		467	92.66	460	96.44
Invalid/blank votes		37	7.34	17	3.56
Total votes		504	100.00	477	100.00
Registered voters/turnout		513	98.25	513	92.98

=== Fourth Secretary ===
Candidate	Party	Votes	%
Rômulo Gouveia (PB) ✓	PSD	416	100.00
Total		416	100.00
Valid votes		416	82.54
Invalid/blank votes		88	17.46
Total votes		504	100.00
Registered voters/turnout		513	98.25
