= Agnelo Queiroz =

Brazilian politician

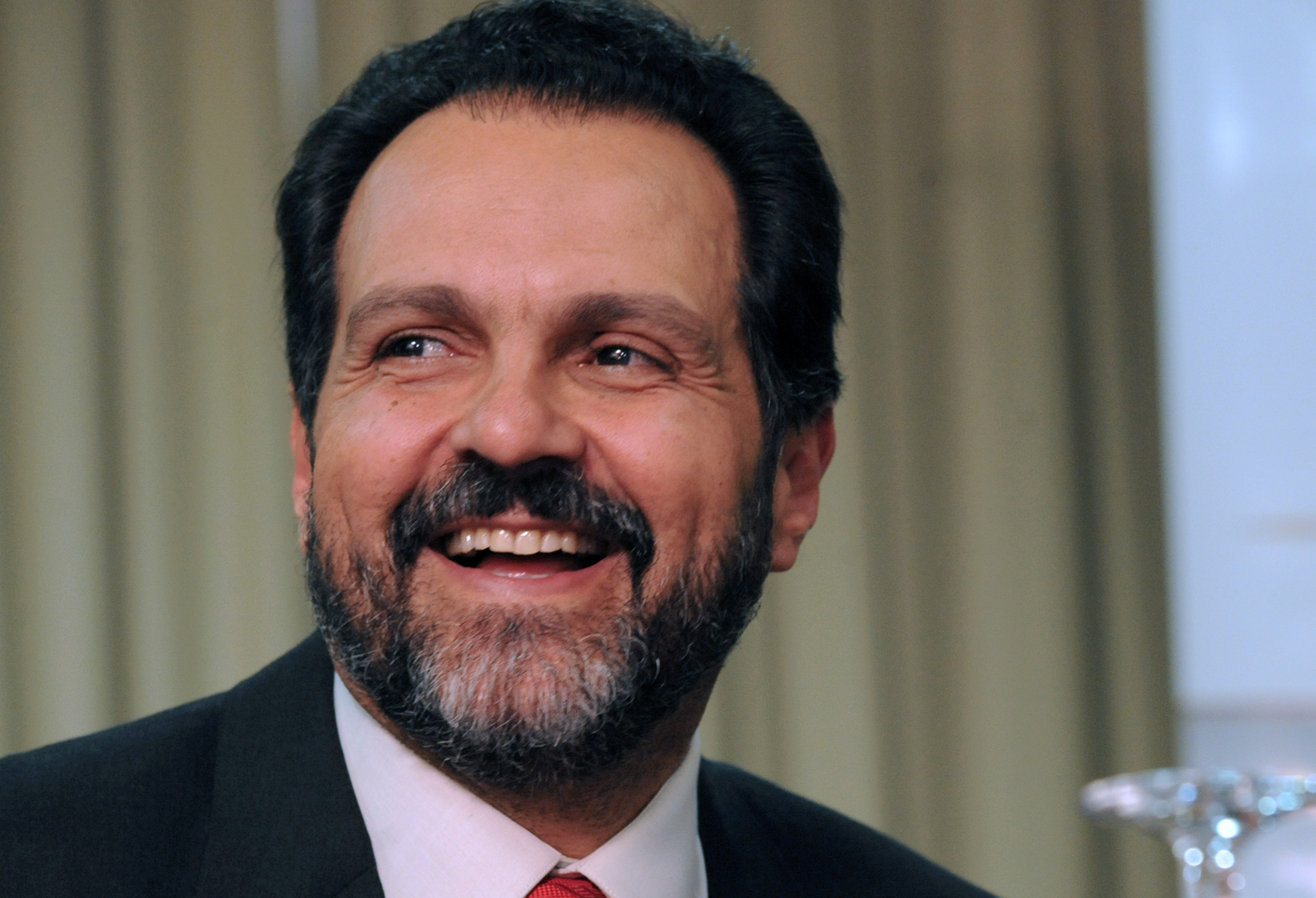

Member-elect of the Chamber of Deputies
- Assuming office 1 February 2027
- Constituency: Federal District
- In office 1 February 1995 – 1 February 2007
- Constituency: Federal District

Governor of the Federal District
- In office 1 January 2011 – 1 January 2015
- Vice Governor: Tadeu Filippelli
- Preceded by: Rogério Rosso
- Succeeded by: Rodrigo Rollemberg

Minister of Sports
- In office 1 January 2003 – 31 March 2006
- President: Luiz Inácio Lula da Silva
- Preceded by: Caio Cibella de Carvalho
- Succeeded by: Orlando Silva

Member of the Legislative Chamber of the Federal District
- In office 1 January 1991 – 1 January 1995
- Constituency: At-large

Personal details
- Born: Agnelo dos Santos Queiroz Filho; November 9, 1958 (age 68) Itapetinga, Bahia, Brazil
- Party: PT (2008–present)
- Other political affiliations: PCdoB (1985–2008)
- Education: Federal University of Bahia
- Profession: Physician

Agnelo dos Santos Queiroz Filho (born 9 November 1958) is a Brazilian politician and member of the Workers' Party (PT) since 2008. He had served as Governor of the Federal District of Brazil from 1 January 2011 until 31 December 2014.

== Political career ==
Elected district deputy in the first election for the Legislative Assembly of the Federal District in 1990 by PCdoB. The parliamentary activity accredited him for a position as a federal deputy in 1994, re-electing in 1998 and again in 2002. He was co-author, along with Senator Paulista Pedro Piva, of Law No. 10,264 of July 16, 2001, known as Law Agnelo/Piva establishing the transfer of 2% of the gross revenues of all lotteries to the Brazilian Olympic Committee . He was sports minister in the Lula government in 2003 until 2006, when he licensed to apply in elections that year to one of the chairs of the Senate of the Federal District. Even defeated by Joaquim Roriz, he got a significant voting with 544,313 votes, 42.93% of the valid votes. He holds the position of Director of the National Health Surveillance Agency since 24 October 2007, and left PCdoB and soon after, the 9 July 2008, is affiliated to the Workers' Party.

== Elections 2010 ==
On 31 October 2010, was elected by PT as governor of the Federal District with vice governor Tadeu Filippelli by PMDB. Agnelo received 66.1% of the votes, against 33.9% of Weslian Roriz (PSC), wife of former governor Joaquim Roriz (PSC). Agnelo was elected presenting proposals to create a single ticket on public transport, create 400 Family Health Teams and Emergency Unit in each of the 30 administrative regions of the DF, halve the number of commissioned positions, appointing public employees, beyond to build at least 100 thousand housing units.

Political offices
Preceded by Caio Cibella de Carvalho	Minister of Sports; 2003–2006)	Succeeded by Orlando Silva
Preceded by Rogério Rosso	Governor of the Federal District; 2011–2015	Succeeded by Rodrigo Rollemberg
