= Jovair Arantes =

Brazilian politician

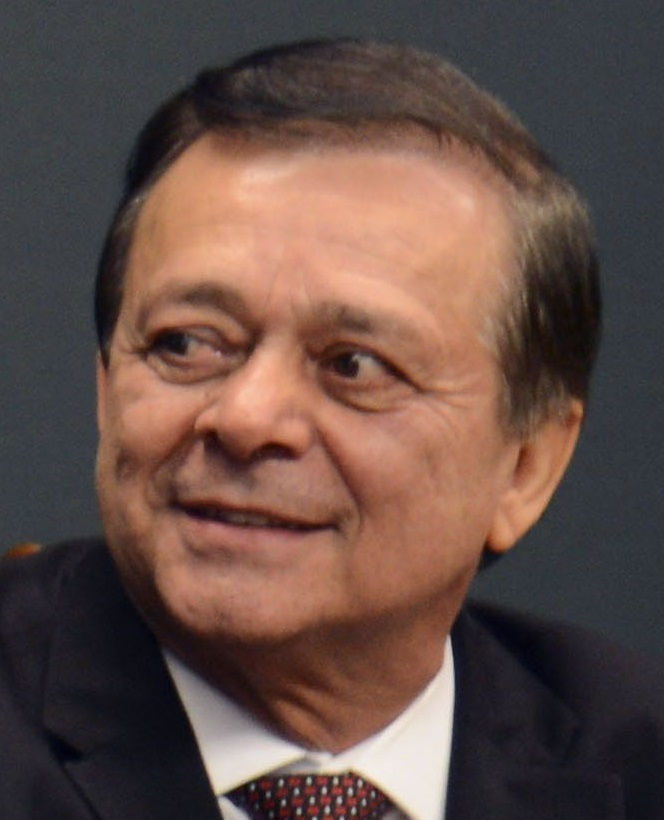

Member of the Chamber of Deputies
- In office 1 February 1995 – 1 February 2019
- Constituency: Goiás

Member of the Legislative Assembly of Goiás
- In office 1 January 1991 – 1 January 1992
- Constituency: At-large

Personal details
- Born: Jovair de Oliveira Arantes; 4 June 1951 (age 75) Buriti Alegre, Goiás, Brazil
- Party: Republicanos (2022–present)
- Other political affiliations: PMDB (1983–1989); PSDB (1989–2003); PTB (2003–2019); MDB (2019–2022)
- Profession: Dental surgeon

Jovair de Oliveira Arantes (born 4 June 1951) is a Brazilian politician.

Jovair Arantes is an advisor and has been leader of the Atlético Goianiense.

Jovair is known for being the rapporteur of the impeachment of Dilma Rousseff in the Chamber of Deputies. His report was, then, approved and proceeded to the Plenary to be voted by all of the 513 deputies.

On 7 July 2016, deputy Eduardo Cunha (PMDB-RJ) resigned of his office of Speaker of the Chamber. Acting Speaker Waldir Maranhão called in for new elections on the same day. Jovair Arantes wanted to run for Speaker, but gave up to support deputy Rogério Rosso (PSD-DF).
