= Chinaglia =

Chinaglia (pronounced [kiˈnaʎʎa]) is an Italian surname from Veneto. Notable people with the surname include:

- Arlindo Chinaglia (born 1949), Brazilian politician
- Giorgio Chinaglia (1947–2012), Italian football player
