= Maurício Carvalho =

Brazilian politician (born 1988)

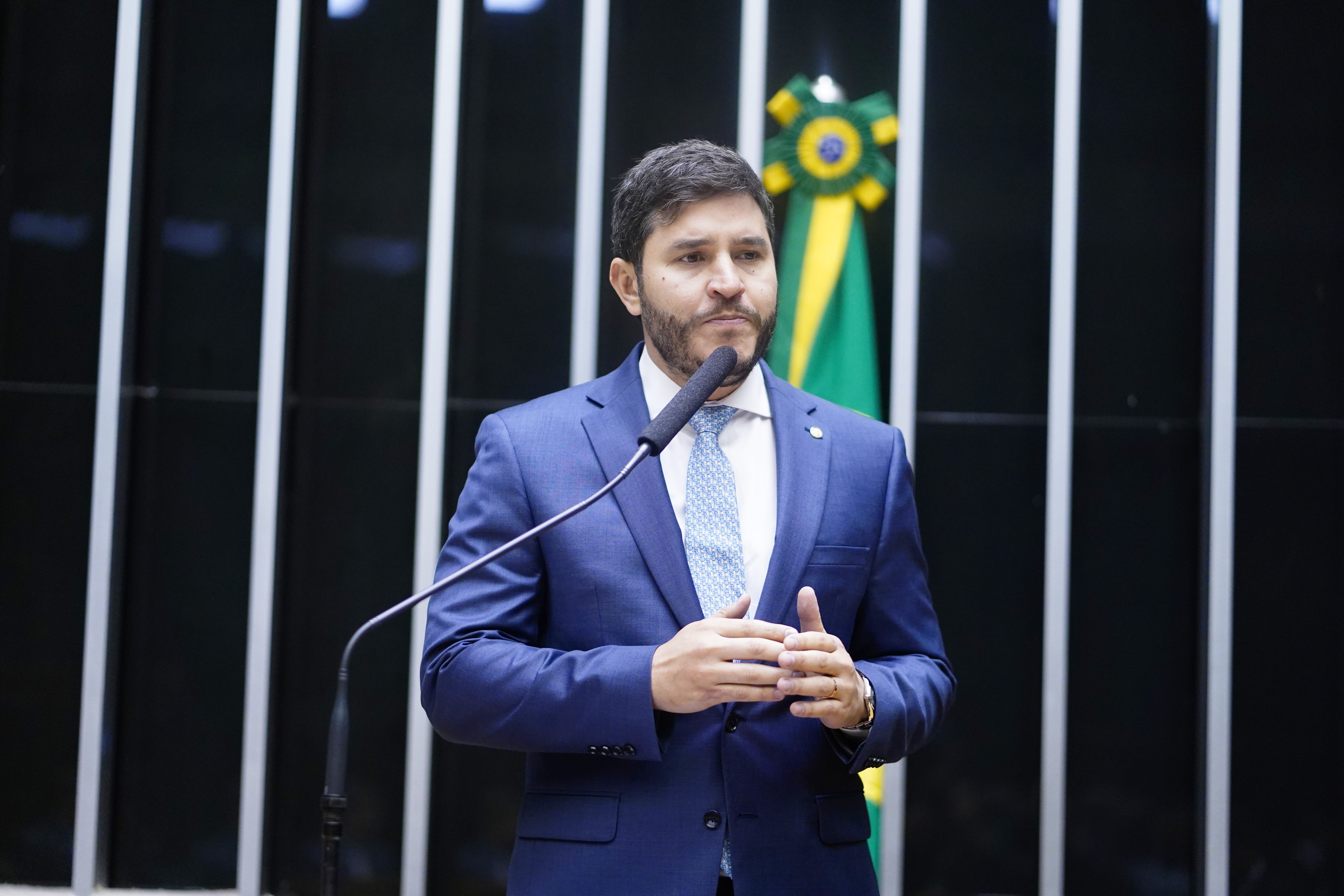
- Carvalho in 2023

Member of the Chamber of Deputies
- Incumbent
- Assumed office 1 February 2023
- Constituency: Rondônia

Personal details
- Born: 25 June 1988 (age 38) Porto Velho, Brazil
- Party: Brazil Union (since 2022)
- Relatives: Mariana Carvalho (sister)

Maurício Carvalho (born 25 June 1988) is a Brazilian politician serving as a member of the Chamber of Deputies since 2023. He is the brother of Mariana Carvalho.
