= Rogério Rosso =

Brazilian politician

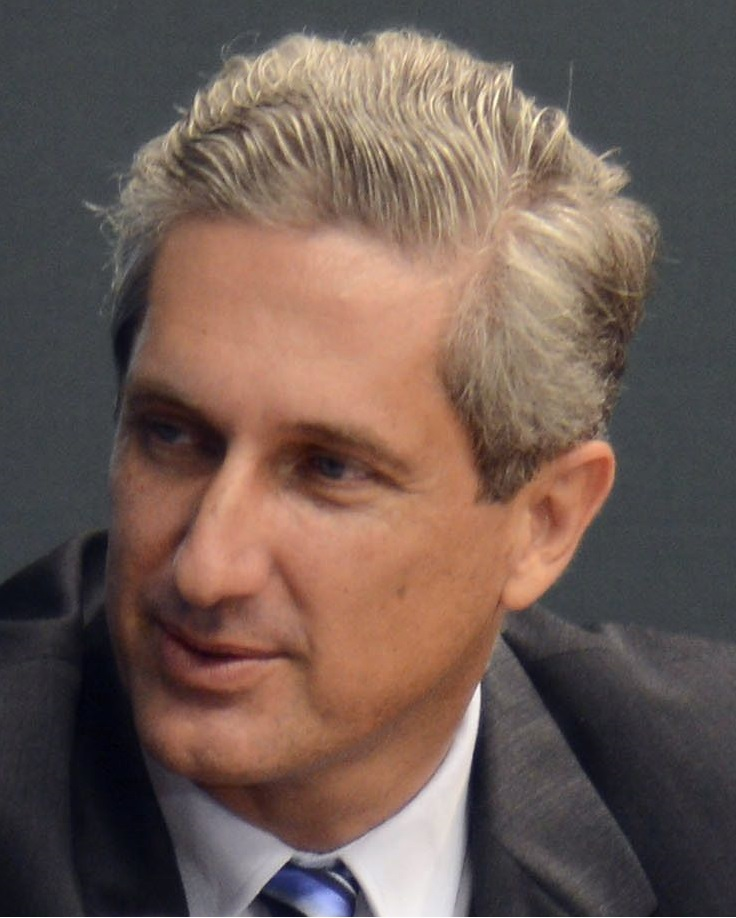

Member of the Chamber of Deputies
- Incumbent
- Assumed office 1 February 2015
- Constituency: Federal District

Governor of the Federal District
- In office 19 April 2010 – 1 January 2011
- Lieutenant: Ivelise Longhi
- Preceded by: Wilson Lima (acting)
- Succeeded by: Agnelo Queiroz

Personal details
- Born: Rogério Schumann Rosso; 30 August 1968 (age 58) Rio de Janeiro, RJ, Brazil
- Party: PSD (2011–present); PMDB (2005–2011)
- Spouse: Karina Curi Rosso
- Education: Brasília University Center (UniCEUB); Getúlio Vargas Foundation (FGV)
- Occupation: Lawyer

Rogério Schumann Rosso (born 30 August 1968) is a Brazilian lawyer, politician, and musician, affiliated to the Social Democratic Party (PSD).

Rosso was elected governor of the Federal District by the Legislative Chamber after the resignation of both governor and vice governor. After the end of his term on 1 January 2011, Rosso was elected federal deputy in the 2014 elections.

Rogério Rosso is also known for being the president of the 2016 Impeachment Special Committee in the Chamber of Deputies.

The deputy was candidate for Speaker of the Chamber in the election of 13 July 2016, losing to the favorite and incumbent Speaker Rodrigo Maia (DEM-RJ).

== Early life and education ==
Born in Rio de Janeiro, he moved to Brasília at the age of one. He holds a law degree from the Centro Universitário de Brasília (UniCEUB) and is a specialist in Marketing from the Getúlio Vargas Foundation (FGV) as well as in Tax Law, also from UniCEUB. He worked at Caterpillar Inc. and Mercedes-Benz before becoming a director at Fiat in Brasília.

Political offices
Preceded by Wilson Lima (acting)	Governor of Federal District; 2010	Succeeded by Agnelo Queiroz
