= Prosecutor General of the Republic of Crimea =

Prosecutor General of Republic of Crimea
- Incumbent; Oleg Kamshilov
- Nominator: Head
- Appointer: Head with advice and consent from the State Council
- Term length: 5 years
- Inaugural holder: Natalia Poklonskaya
- Formation: Established by act
- Website: Прокуратура Республики Крым

In the Republic of Crimea, the Attorney General's office is known as Prosecutor General's office, hence the name of the role or position.

The Prosecutor General of the Republic of Crimea (Russian: Главный прокурор Республики Крым) is the prosecutor and attorney who represents the Republic of Crimea (Note: Since the annexation of Crimea by the Russian Federation, the status of the Crimea and of the city of Sevastopol is under dispute between Russia and Ukraine; Ukraine and the majority of the international community considers the Crimea and Sevastopol an integral part of Ukraine, while Russia, on the other hand, considers the Crimea and Sevastopol an integral part of Russia, with Sevastopol functioning as a federal city within the Crimean Federal District.) in all civil and criminal matters in which it is a party or has an interest, and which are handled on appeal or in any other manner in the courts of Crimea, Russia, or its territories or possessions. The prosecutor reports directly to the Head of the Republic of Crimea and leads the Office of the Prosecutor General of the Republic of Crimea.

== List ==
No.	Portrait	Name	Took office	Left office	Head of the Republic
1		Natalia Poklonskaya	March 25, 2014	October 6, 2016	Sergey Aksyonov
—		Andrey Fomin (acting)	August 3, 2016	December, 2016	Sergey Aksyonov
2		Oleg Kamshylov	February 2, 2017	Incumbent	Sergey Aksyonov
