= Mariana Carvalho =

Brazilian politician (born 1986)

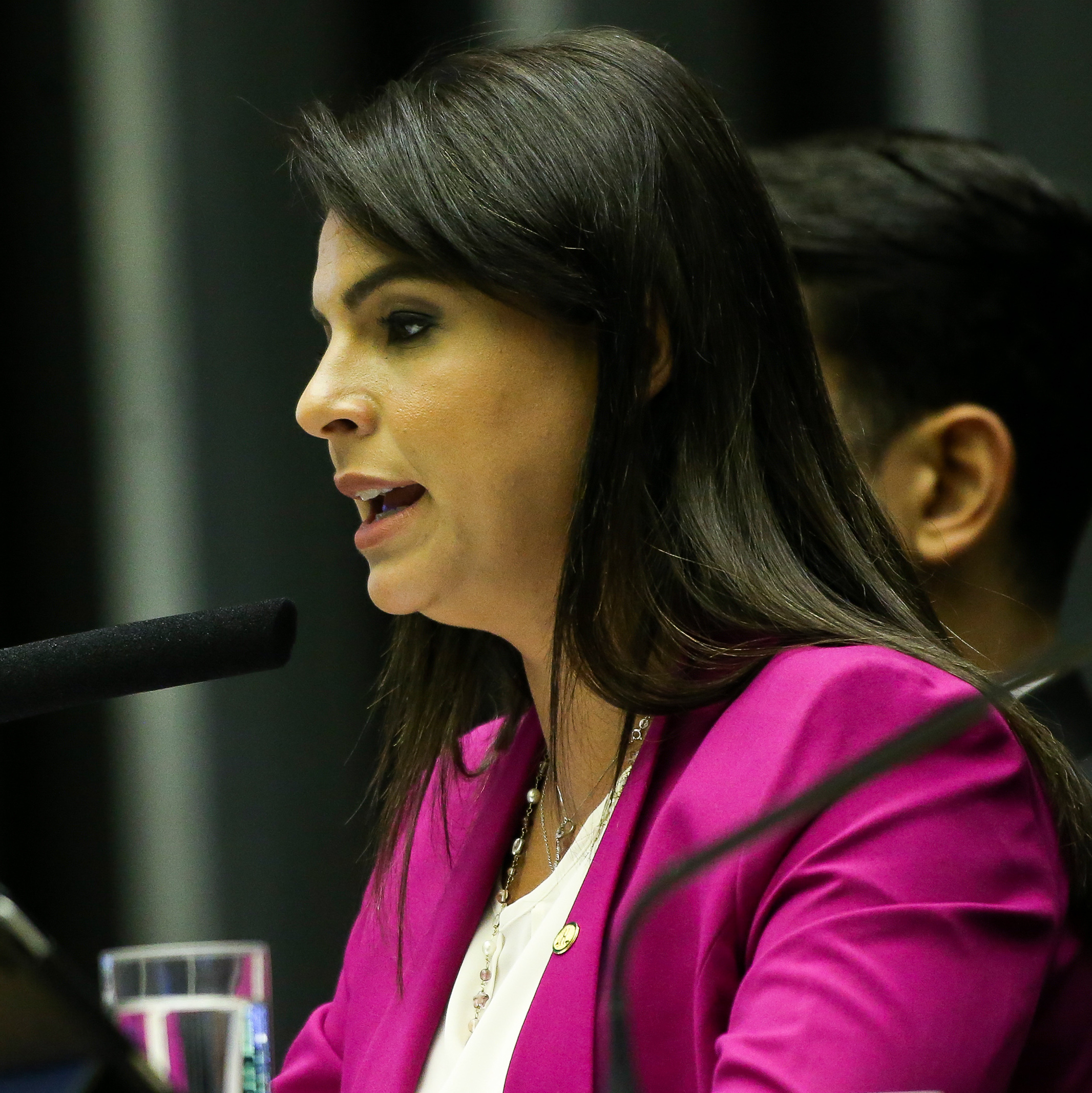
- Carvalho in 2017

Federal Deputy for Rondônia
- Incumbent
- Assumed office 1 February 2015

Vereador for Porto Velho
- In office 1 January 2009 – 1 January 2013

Personal details
- Born: 26 November 1986 (age 39) São Paulo, Brazil
- Party: REP
- Relatives: Maurício Carvalho (brother)

Mariana Fonseca Ribeiro Carvalho de Moraes (born 26 November 1986) is a Brazilian politician. Although born in São Paulo she has spent her political career representing Rondônia, having served as federal deputy representative since 2015.

== Early life and education ==
Carvalho was born to a medic, Aparício Carvalho, and Maria Sílvia Carvalho, a journalist, lawyer, economist, and professor of history. Her father was the vereador/councilman of Porto Velho, federal deputy and vice governor of Rondônia.

Mariana holds a degree in law and medicine, and as of 2016 was completing medical residency in cardiology.

== Political career ==
Pinato voted in favor of the impeachment against then-president Dilma Rousseff and political reformation. She would later vote in favor of opening a corruption investigation against Rousseff's successor Michel Temer, and voted in favor of the 2017 Brazilian labor reforms.

In 2017 Carvalho was elected head of her party for the state of Rondônia.
