= Waldir Maranhão =

Brazilian politician

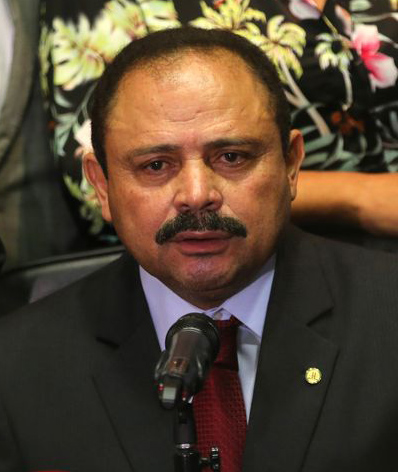

Federal Deputy for Maranhão
- In office 1 February 2007 – 1 February 2019

First Vice President of the Chamber of Deputies
- In office 1 February 2015 – 2 February 2017
- Preceded by: Arlindo Chinaglia
- Succeeded by: Fábio Ramalho

President of the Chamber of Deputies Acting
- In office 5 May 2016 – 14 July 2016
- Preceded by: Eduardo Cunha
- Succeeded by: Rodrigo Maia

Personal details
- Born: August 4, 1955 (age 70) São Luís, Maranhão
- Political party: PSDB
- Education: Federation of Higher Schools of Maranhão (BVSC); Federal University of Minas Gerais (MVSC)
- Profession: Veterinary Surgeon

Waldir Maranhão Cardoso (born 4 August 1955) is a Brazilian politician who served in the Chamber of Deputies from 2007 to 2019, and was President of the Chamber of Deputies in 2016. He was a member of the Progressistas, PTdoB, Avante, and Brazilian Social Democracy parties.

== Early life and education ==
Waldir Maranhão Cardoso was born in São Luís, Maranhão, on 4 August 1955. He attended Maranhão High School from 1964 to 1974. He graduated from the Federation of Higher Schools of Maranhão with a Bachelor of Veterinary Science after attending from 1975 to 1979, and from the Federal University of Minas Gerais with a Master of Veterinary Science after attending from 1984 to 1985.

== Career ==
=== Academic and medicine ===
At the School of Veterinary Medicine in São Luís, Maranhão was a professor of anatomy of domestic animals in 1981. The International Zoonosis Association was formed in 1986, with Maranhão as a founding member. At the National Council for Scientific and Technological Development he was a researcher from 1985 to 1987. He was the vice-rector of Maranhão State University from 1991 to 1993, and rector in 1994, and from 2003 to 2006. He was a member of the scientific council of the Brazilian Journal of Veterinary Medicine and the International Zoonosis Journal. He was vice president of the Brazilian Association of Rectors of State and Municipal Universities (ABRUEM) from 2004 to 2006.

=== Politics ===
In the 2006 election Maranhão was elected to the Chamber of Deputies for Maranhão. He was reelected in the 2010 and 2014 elections.

Maranhão was a member of the Progressistas (PP) from 2007 to 2018, PTdoB and Avante from 2017 to 2018, and Brazilian Social Democracy Party (PSDB) since 2018. During his tenure in the chamber he was Secretary of State for Science, Technology, Higher Education and Technological Development from 12 May 2009 to 7 April 2010.

Eduardo Cunha, the President of the Chamber of Deputies, was removed from office by the Supreme Federal Court on 7 July 2016, as part of Operation Car Wash. Maranhão, who was vice president and also under investigation by Operation Car Wash, ascended to the presidency. Maranhão initially annulled the impeachment of President Dilma Rousseff, but reversed his decision after President of the Senate Renan Calheiros stated that he would ignore the annulment. He scheduled an election for president on 14 July, and Rodrigo Maia was elected.

In August 2016, Maranhão was ordered to pay a fine of R$930,000 and return R$9,483,711.36 to the treasury for financial irregularities that occurred when he was rector of the State University of Maranhão.

== Personal life ==
Maranhão is married to Elizabeth Azevedo Cardoso.

== Works cited ==
=== News ===
- "Waldir Maranhão é condenado pelo TCE-MA a devolver R$ 10 milhões". G1. 15 August 2016. Archived from the original on 23 June 2025.
- Baiocchi, Gianpaolo (25 May 2016). "The Brazilian Coup's Image Problem". Boston Review. Archived from the original on 23 June 2025.
- Calgaro, Fernanda (7 July 2016). "Maranhão marca eleição do sucessor de Cunha para a próxima quinta-feira". G1. Archived from the original on 23 June 2025.
- Oliveira, Mariana; Ramalho, Renan (5 May 2016). "Ministro do STF afasta Cunha do mandato e da presidência da Câmara". G1. Archived from the original on 23 June 2025.
- Ramalho, Renan (20 September 2016). "Turma do STF autoriza quebra de sigilo da mulher de Waldir Maranhão". G1. Archived from the original on 23 June 2025.
- Schreiber, Mariana (14 July 2016). "Em reação anti-Cunha, Câmara elege Rodrigo Maia presidente". Terra. Archived from the original on 23 June 2025.

=== Web ===
- "Waldir Maranhão". Chamber of Deputies. Archived from the original on 23 June 2025.

Political offices
Preceded by Eduardo Cunha	President of the Chamber of Deputies (acting); 2016	Succeeded by Rodrigo Maia
