= Beto Mansur =

Brazilian politician and farmer

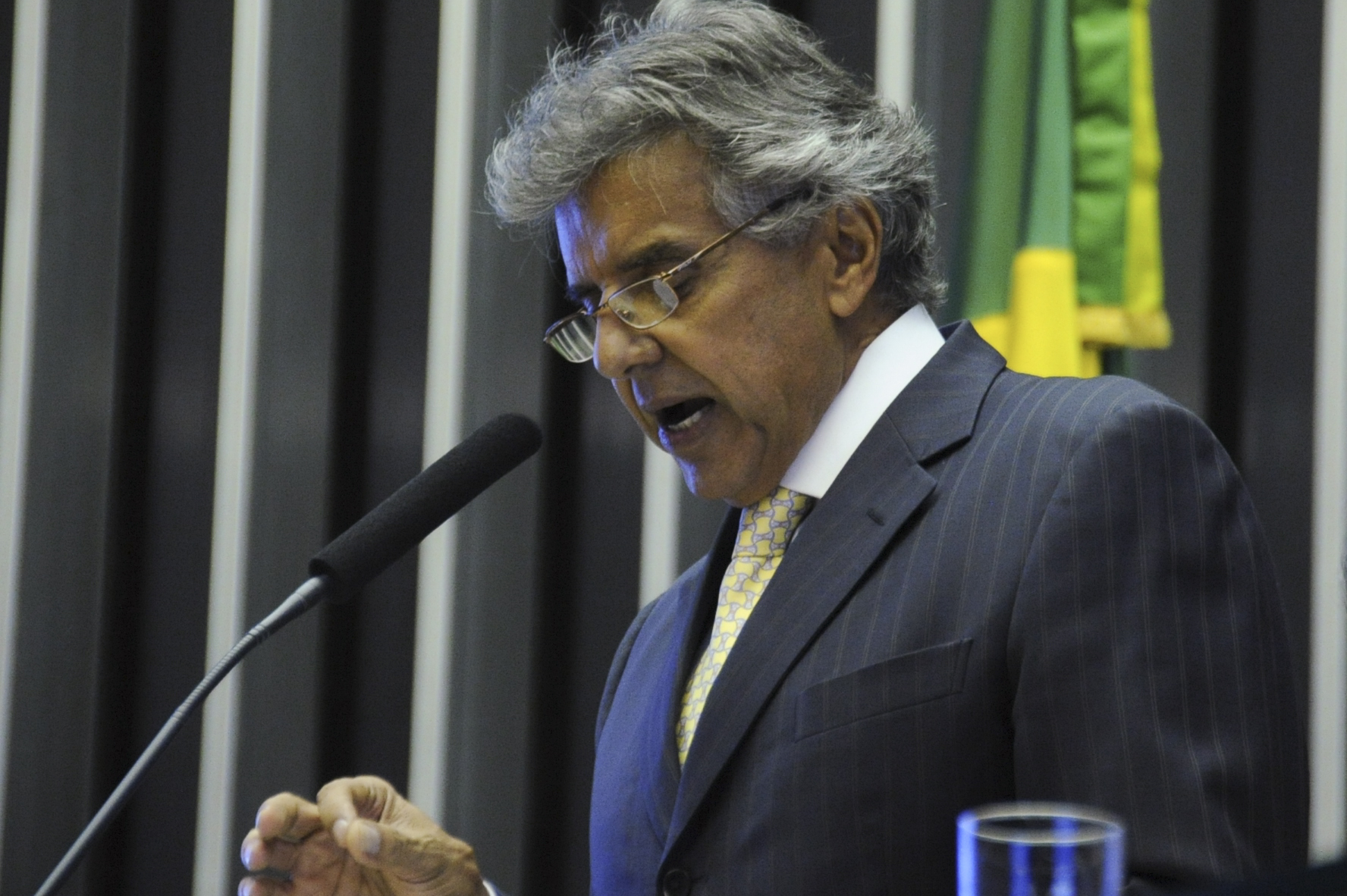
- Born: July 7, 1951; São Vicente, São Paulo, Brazil
- Occupation: Politician

Beto Mansur (born 1951) is a Brazilian politician and soybean farmer. He serves in the Congress and owns a soybean farm in Goiás.
