= Orlando Silva (politician) =

Brazilian politician, former Minister of Sports

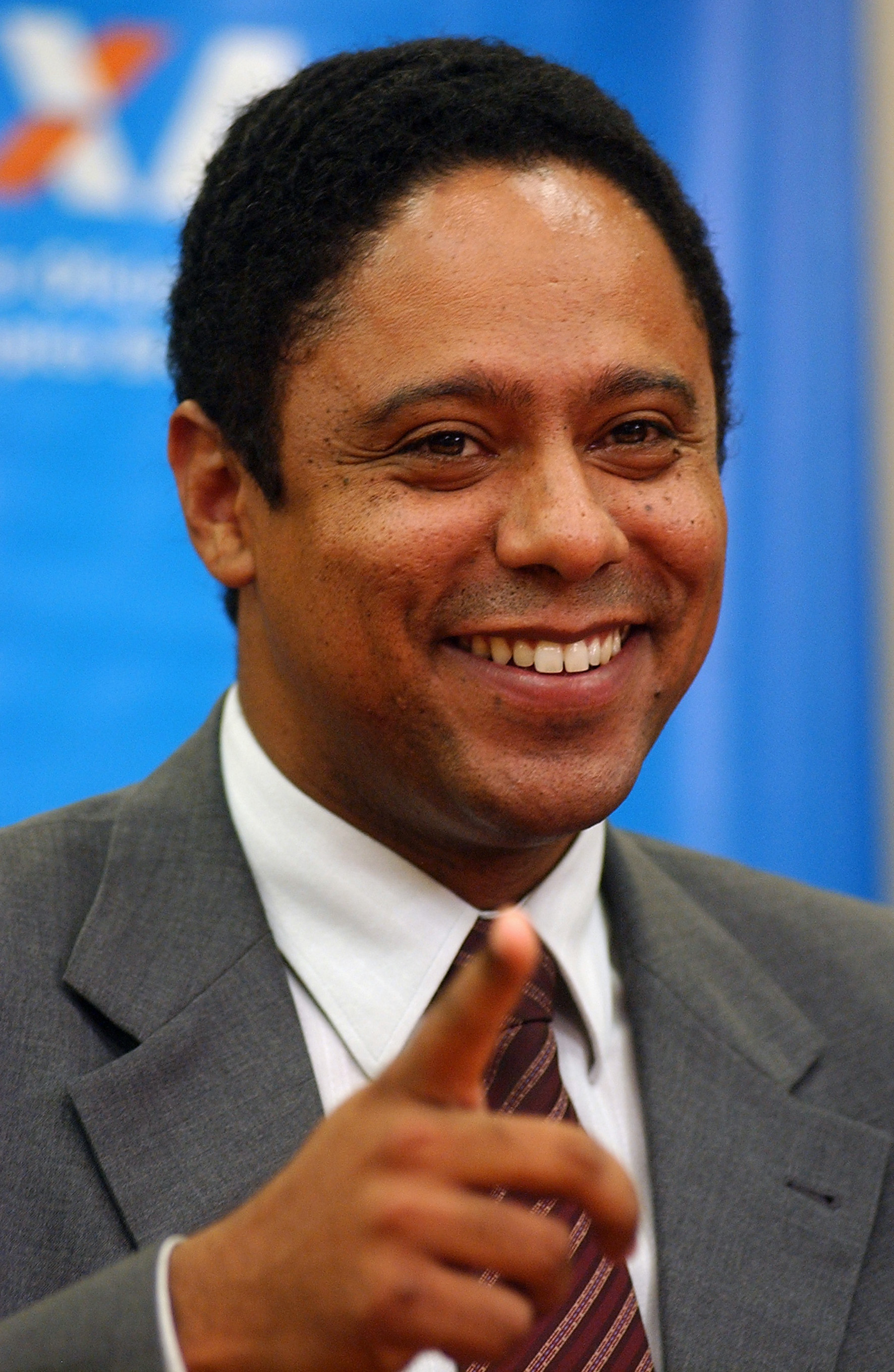

Federal deputy of São Paulo
- In office 2015–2019

Minister of Sports of Brazil
- In office 2006–2011

Personal details
- Born: May 27, 1971 (age 55) Salvador, Bahia, Brazil
- Party: Communist Party of Brazil

Orlando Silva de Jesus Júnior (born 27 May 1971) is a Brazilian politician affiliated with the Communist Party of Brazil (PCdoB). He was Minister of Sports in the Lula da Silva and Dilma Rousseff governments and was elected federal deputy in 2014. In the Chamber of Deputies, he was vice-leader of President Dilma Rousseff between 2015 and 2016. He was chairman of the Labor, Administration and Public Services Commission in 2017, and leader of the PCdoB bench in 2018.

He began his career in the student movement in his hometown of Salvador, Bahia and was the only black president of the National Union of Students (UNE).

== Political career ==
=== As minister ===
In the first year of the Lula administration, Orlando was chosen to succeed Francisco Cláudio Monteiro as executive secretary of the Ministry of Sport after his resignation on November 18, 2003. He also held the positions of National Secretary of Sport and National Secretary of Educational Sport. In 2005, he was decorated by President Luiz Inácio Lula da Silva with the Order of Rio Branco in the rank of Grand Officer.

On 31 March 2006, he was inaugurated as minister. During his tenure, the 2007 Pan American and Parapan American Games were held in Rio de Janeiro.

==== Controversies ====
Between the end of 2007 and the beginning of 2008, Orlando Silva was the subject of allegations of irregular spending on corporate credit cards distributed by the federal government to some civil servants to cover extraordinary expenses. The press reported that the minister had made some payments to restaurants on days when, according to the schedule published by the ministry on the internet, there would be no official commitments. The minister, however, went public to clarify that the internal team identified the error long before the complaint. In order to avoid any misunderstanding, Orlando asked for an audit to evaluate what happened and to obtain transparency in the result.The ministry even justified at the time by claiming that there were "update problems" in the dissemination of the schedule.The report of the Parliamentary Commission of Inquiry that investigated the matter found the minister not guilty.

In the course of the scandal, Orlando Silva returned all the money spent on the card of which he was the holder, totaling R$30,870.38. The expenses made according to the legislation were returned. Orlando stated that this attitude was nothing more than a political gesture, which reflected his outrage at the allegations.

Orlando Silva left office on 26 October 2011, after his office was involved in allegations of a scheme to divert public money through agreements with NGOs linked to his party. The accusations were raised by military police officer João Dias Ferreira, investigated as part of the group. Silva was replaced by Aldo Rebelo as Minister of Sport.

=== As federal deputy ===
Orlando Silva is a federal deputy for São Paulo, representing PCdoB. He was sworn in as a federal deputy for the first time on February 1, 2015. In the Chamber of Deputies, Silva was deputy leader of the Dilma Rousseff government until she was impeached and then became deputy leader of the minority. He also served as rapporteur for the General Personal Data Protection Law and the Congressional Bill no. 2630, also known as the Fake News Bill.

== Electoral history ==
In the 2012 municipal election, he ran for councilor of São Paulo and was not elected, with 19,739 votes. However, he took over as an alternate in the vacancy of Netinho de Paula, who became secretary of the Racial Equality. He was elected federal deputy for São Paulo in 2014 with 90,641 votes, and re-elected in 2018 with 64,822 votes.

He ran for federal deputy for São Paulo in 2022, and obtained 108,059 votes, but was not elected, remaining as first alternate of the Brazil of Hope Federation in São Paulo. In 2023 he was sworn in as Luiz Marinho's replacement, who became Minister of Labor.

Electoral history of Orlando Silva
Year	Office	Votes	Result	Ref.
2012	Councillor for São Paulo	19.739	Not elect	
2014	Federal deputy for São Paulo	90.641	Elected	
2018	Federal deputy for São Paulo	64.822	Elected	
2020	Mayor of São Paulo	12.254	Not elect	
2022	Federal deputy for São Paulo	108.059	Substitute member	
