= Júlio Delgado =

Brazilian politician (born 1966)

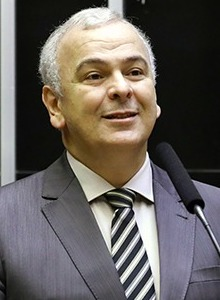
- Delgado in 2021

Member of the Chamber of Deputies
- In office 1 February 2003 – 31 January 2023
- Constituency: Minas Gerais
- In office 2 September 1999 – 23 December 2000
- Constituency: Minas Gerais

Personal details
- Born: 18 November 1966 (age 59)
- Party: Brazilian Democratic Movement (since 2024)
- Parent: Tarcísio Delgado (father)

Júlio César Delgado (born 18 November 1966) is a Brazilian politician. He was a member of the Chamber of Deputies from 1999 to 2000 and from 2003 to 2023. He is the son of Tarcísio Delgado.

In the 2026 Presidential elections in Brazil, he was the candidate for the office of the vice-president for Augusto Cury but their list only reached 2,89% of the votes and they did not reach the 2nd round.
