= Fernando Giacobo =

Brazilian politician (born 1970)

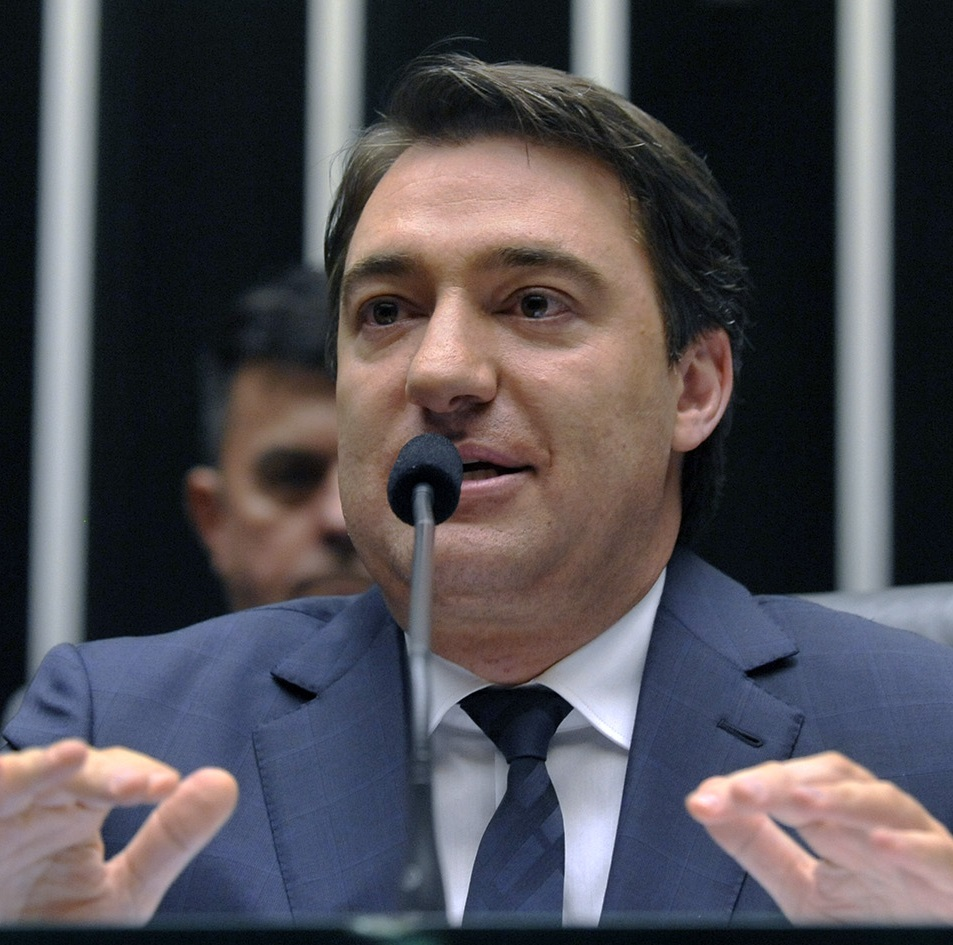
- Giacobo in 2016

Member of the Chamber of Deputies
- Incumbent
- Assumed office 1 February 2003
- Constituency: Paraná

Personal details
- Born: 17 December 1970 (age 55)
- Party: Liberal Party (since 2006)

Fernando Lúcio Giacobo (born 17 December 1970) is a Brazilian politician serving as a member of the Chamber of Deputies since 2003. He has served as Congress minority leader since 2025.
