= Rodrigo Maia =

Brazilian politician (born 1970)

His Excellency Rodrigo Maia
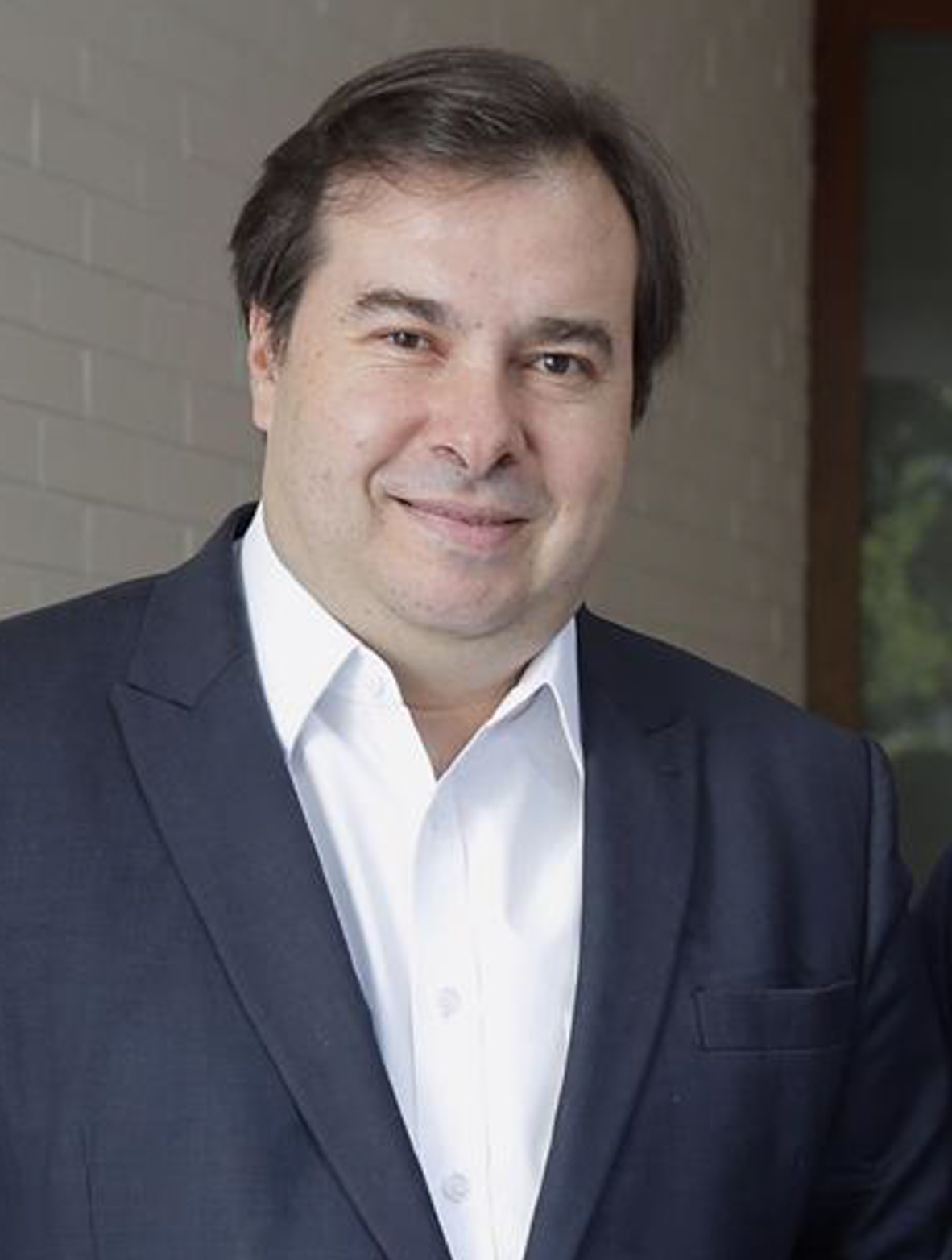
- Maia in 2019

Federal Deputy
- In office 1 February 1999 – 1 February 2023
- Constituency: Rio de Janeiro

State Secretary of Projects and Strategic Actions of São Paulo
- In office 20 August 2021 – 5 October 2022
- Governor: João Doria (2021–2022); Rodrigo Garcia (2022)
- Preceded by: Office established
- Succeeded by: Tarcila Reis Jordão

President of the Chamber of Deputies
- In office 14 July 2016 – 1 February 2021
- Preceded by: Eduardo Cunha
- Succeeded by: Arthur Lira

National President of Democrats
- In office 26 March 2007 – 6 December 2011
- Preceded by: Jorge Bornhausen
- Succeeded by: José Agripino Maia

Personal details
- Born: Rodrigo Felinto Ibarra Epitácio Maia; 12 June 1970 (age 56) Santiago, Chile
- Party: PSD (2024–present)
- Other political affiliations: PDT (1989–1998); DEM (1998–1999; 2001–2021); PTB (1999–2001); PSDB (2022–2024)
- Spouse: Patrícia Vasconcelos (m. 2005)
- Children: 4
- Parent(s): Cesar Maia; Mariangeles Ibarra

Rodrigo Felinto Ibarra Epitácio Maia (born 12 June 1970) is a Brazilian politician who served as the President of the Chamber of Deputies of Brazil between July 2016 and February 2021. A member of the Brazilian Social Democracy Party since 2022, he is the son of former Rio de Janeiro Mayor Cesar Maia and was reelected five times as a congressman until 2023, when he decided to not run for a sixth term in the Chamber of Deputies. Maia was affiliated to the Democrats party, formerly PFL, from 1996 to 2021, when he was expelled from the party for criticizing the party president, ACM Neto.

== Biography ==
Rodrigo Maia was born in Chile, while his father, the former Rio de Janeiro Mayor Cesar Maia was living in exile, and was registered at the Brazilian consulate in Santiago. Maia started economics at Candido Mendes University, but did not complete the course.

In 1990, before starting a career in politics, he worked for Banco BMG and then Banco Icatu. From 1997 to 1998, Maia was Municipal Secretary of the Mayor of Rio de Janeiro.

In April 2012, he won the title of citizen of the State of Rio de Janeiro.

Since february 2023, Rodrigo Maia has been the CEO of the National Confederation of Financial Institutions named Fin.

With a long-standing career in the public sector, he served six consecutive terms as a federal congressman representing the state of Rio de Janeiro and was Speaker of the House of Representatives from 2016 to 2020, becoming the longest-serving Speaker in the history of the Chamber.

On 14 June 2021, the National Executive of the Democrats decided to expel Maia from the party, after conflicts between the party and the former President of the Chamber.

== Personal life ==
Maia married lawyer Vanessa Rahal Canado on 27 September 2025. He is the father of five children (Ana Luisa, Ana Beatriz, Maria Antonia, Rodrigo and Felipe).

== Operation Car Wash ==
Rodrigo Maia's name appears in Operation Car Wash. According to the Brazilian weekly magazine Epoca, he exchanged text messages with contractor Léo Pinheiro, from Grupo OAS regarding electoral donations. On 8 February 2017, Jornal Nacional reported that the Federal Police investigation had concluded that there were signs of passive corruption and money laundering. The investigation began with text messages exchanged between Leo Pinheiro and Maia. He is accused of providing "political favors" and defending OAS interests in Congress in 2013 and 2014. According to the Federal Police, Maia helped OAS by introducing an amendment to the provisional measure that created rules for regional aviation. Investigators believe that Maia asked the contractor for $1 million reais in electoral donations in 2014 (this money was officially given to Cesar Maia, Rodrigo Maia's father, campaign) and that this transfer was an attempt to hide the real origin of the money. Maia has denied any involvement. Given Maia's privilege as congressman, deciding whether to open investigations against him will be the responsibility of the federal Public Prosecutor's Office.

In August 2019, Brazil's Federal Police found evidence of corruption and money laundering related to Rodrigo Maia. The federal police sent a final report on the investigation to the supreme court.

The biggest implicated company, Odebrecht kept an entire department to coordinate the payment of bribes to politicians. In the Car Wash Operation, officers seized several electronic spreadsheets linking the payments to nicknames. Every corrupt politician received a nickname based on physical characteristics, public trajectory, personal infos, owned cars/boats, origin place or generic preferences. Rodrigo Maia's nickname was 'Botafogo', referring to the football team he supports.

Political offices
Preceded by Waldir Maranhão; Acting	President of the Chamber of Deputies; 2016–2021	Succeeded by Arthur Lira
Office created	State Secretary of Projects and Strategic Actions of São Paulo; 2021–2022	Succeeded by Tarcila Reis Jordão
Party political offices
Preceded by Jorge Bornhausen	National President of the Democrats; 2007–2011	Succeeded by José Agripino Maia
Preceded by Solange Amaral	DEM nominee for Mayor of Rio de Janeiro; 2012	Succeeded by Eduardo Paes
