= Arlindo Chinaglia =

Brazilian politician (born 1949)

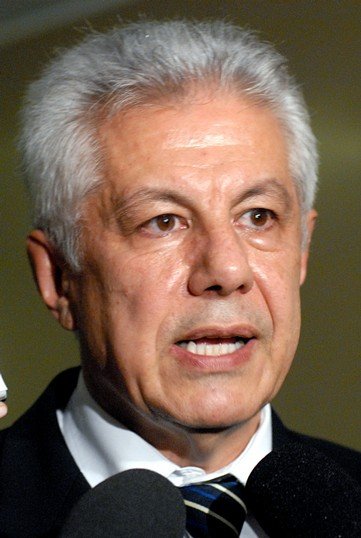

President of the Chamber of Deputies
- In office 1 February 2007 – 2 February 2009
- Preceded by: Aldo Rebelo
- Succeeded by: Michel Temer

Member of the Chamber of Deputies
- Incumbent
- Assumed office 1 February 1995
- Constituency: São Paulo

Member of the Legislative Assembly of São Paulo
- In office 15 March 1991 – 1 February 1995
- Constituency: At-large

Personal details
- Born: Arlindo Chinaglia Junior; 24 December 1949 (age 76) Serra Azul, São Paulo, Brazil
- Party: PT (1980–present)
- Education: University of Brasília (BM)
- Profession: Physician

Arlindo Chinaglia Junior (Brazilian Portuguese: [aʁˈlĩdu kiˈnaʎɐ]; born 24 December 1949) is a Brazilian politician and former President of the Chamber of Deputies of Brazil 2007–2009. He represents the state of São Paulo in the National Congress of Brazil for the Workers' Party.
