= Beto Rosado =

Brazilian politician (born 1982)

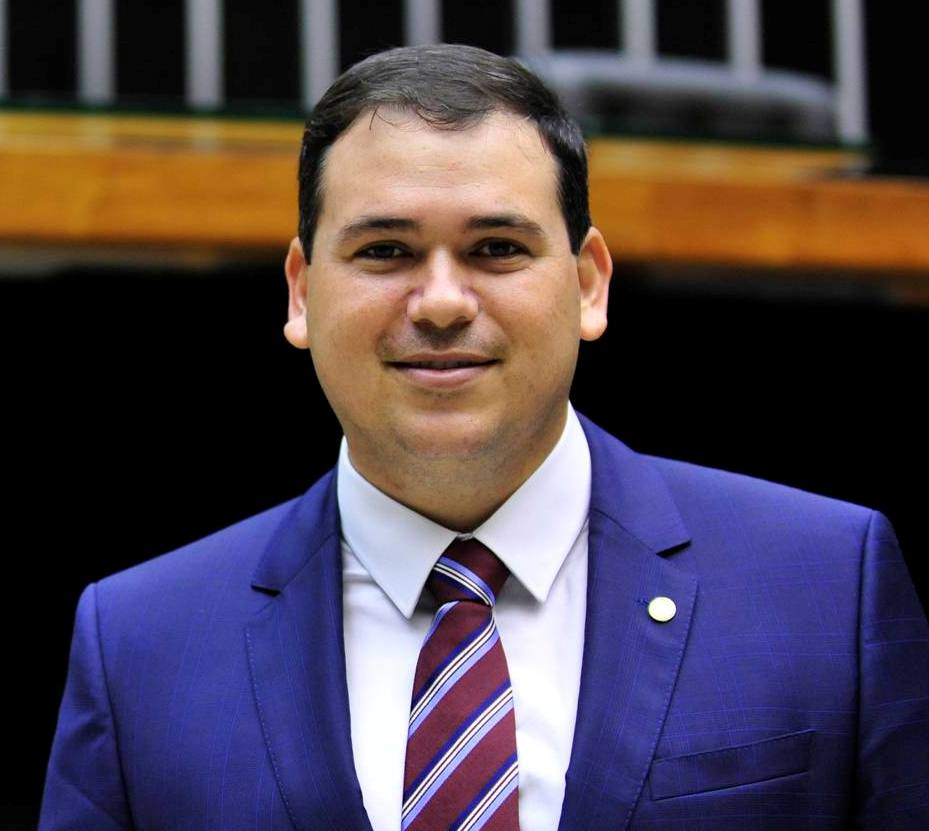
- Rosado in 2015

Member of the Chamber of Deputies
- In office 1 February 2015 – 31 January 2023
- Constituency: Rio Grande do Norte

Personal details
- Born: 1 February 1982 (age 44)
- Party: Progressistas (since 2013)
- Parent: Betinho Rosado (father)

Carlos Alberto de Sousa Rosado Segundo (born 1 February 1982), better known as Beto Rosado, is a Brazilian politician. From 2015 to 2023, he was a member of the Chamber of Deputies. He is the son of Betinho Rosado.
