= Betinho Rosado =

Brazilian politician (1948–2024)

Betinho Rosado (23 December 1948 – 12 April 2024) was a Brazilian politician who served as a Deputy. He died on 12 April 2024, at the age of 75.
