= Presidency of Dilma Rousseff =

Brazilian presidential administration from 2011 to 2016

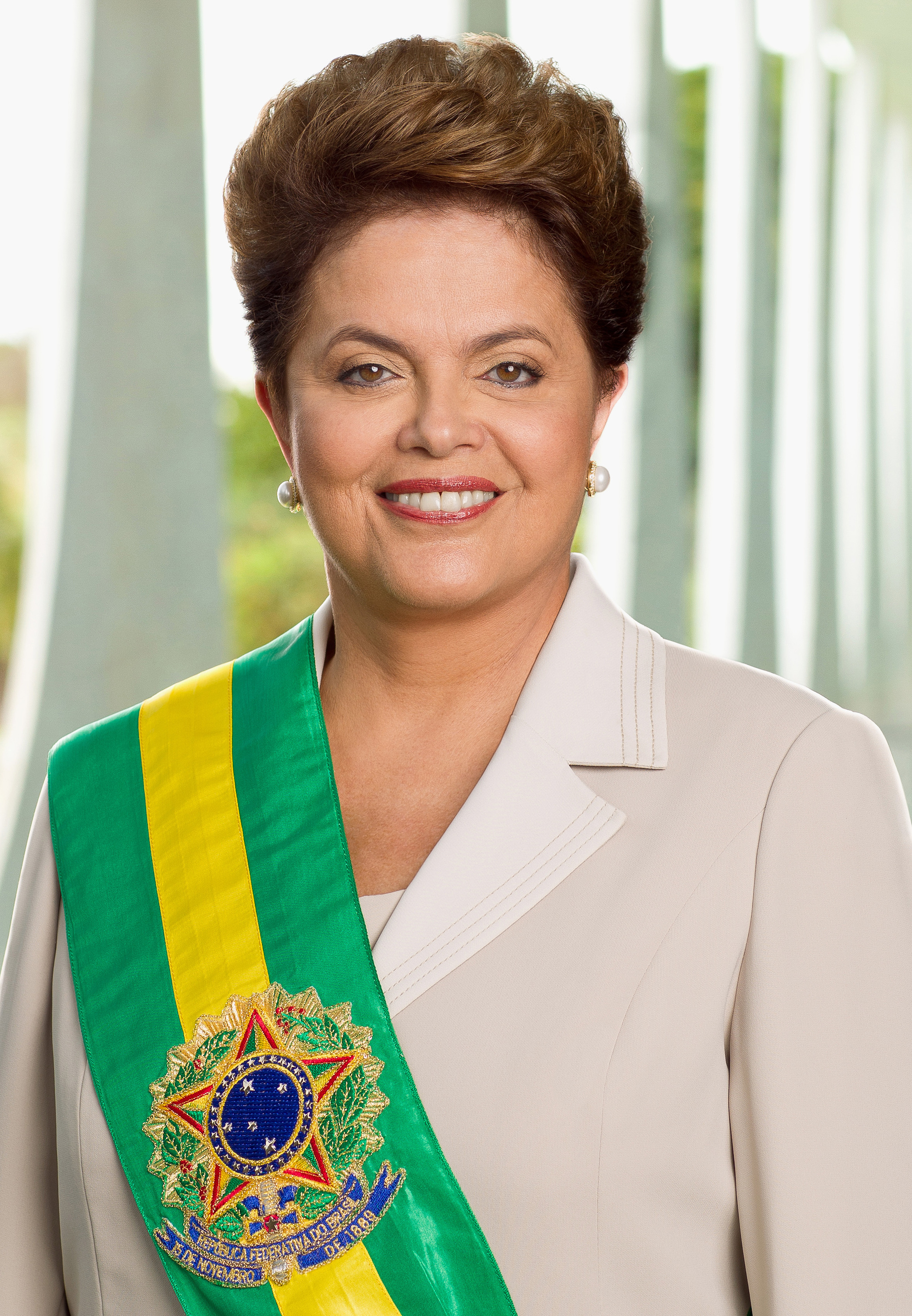
- Presidency of Dilma Rousseff; 1 January 2011 – 31 August 2016
- Vice President: Michel Temer
- Cabinet: Full list
- Party: Workers
- Election: 2010; 2014
- Seat: Alvorada Palace

The presidency of Dilma Rousseff began on 1 January 2011 with Dilma Vana Rousseff's inauguration as president after defeating PSDB candidate José Serra in the 2010 elections, and ended with her impeachment on 31 August 2016, already in her second term.

The period was historic because it was the first time a woman had held the Presidency of the Republic in Brazil. Initially, the government had 37 ministries in the first term and 39 in the second term, the largest number of ministries since redemocratization in 1985.

In her first months in office, Dilma contradicted the desire of sectors of her own party to regulate the press and declared that "a free media is essential for democracy". Dilma's second term was marked by a serious economic and political crisis in the country, with GDP per capita shrinking by more than 9% between 2014 and 2016. In the year of her impeachment, the unemployment rate stood at 12%, while in 2010 it was 6.7%. Even after her departure, the unemployment rate remained in the double digits for more than five years, falling only in March 2022, during Jair Bolsonaro's presidency.

The Democracy Index, drawn up annually by the British magazine The Economist, ranked Brazil as the 47th most democratic country in the world in 2010, the beginning of the presidency of Dilma; in the 2013 ranking, it appeared in 44th place. According to the survey, 11% of the world's population lived in "complete democracies", which was not the case in Brazil, still considered an "imperfect democracy".

== Inauguration ==
=== First term ===
Dilma and her vice-president, Michel Temer, were sworn in by the Superior Electoral Court (TSE) at a ceremony held on 17 December 2010, at 5 pm, at the TSE headquarters in Brasília, attended by 250 guests, including relatives and politicians. Dilma said she would "honour women, take care of the weakest and govern for all". The diplomas were made at the Brazilian Mint and read:

By the will of the Brazilian people, expressed at the polls on 31 October 2010, the candidate for the coalition Para o Brasil Seguir Mudando, Dilma Vana Rousseff, was elected president of the Federative Republic of Brazil. In testimony of this fact, the Election Justice issued this diploma, which entitles her to take office before the National Congress on 1 January 2011, under the terms of the Constitution.

==== Inauguration ceremony and subsequent events ====
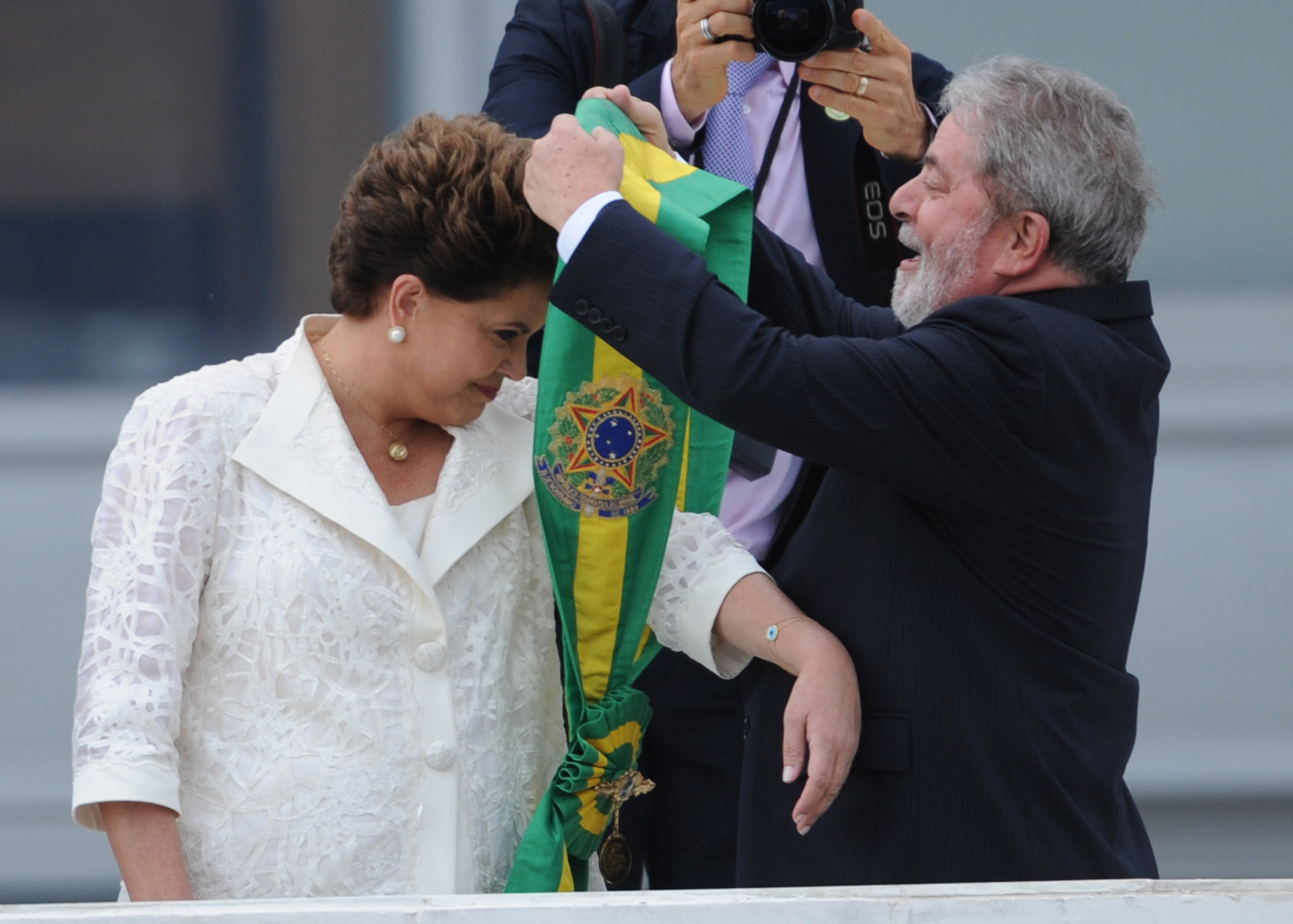
Dilma receives the presidential sash from Lula da Silva on 1 January 2011

Dilma took office as president of Brazil on 1 January 2011. The inauguration event – which was organized by her transition team, the Ministries of Foreign Affairs and Defence and the Presidency of the Republic – was expected with anticipation, as she was the first woman to preside over the country. Important female figures in Brazil's history were honoured with panels all over the Monumental Axis in Brasília. According to the Federal District Military Police, around 30,000 people attended the event.

By 21 December 2010, the Senate's publishing house had printed 1,229 invitations for Dilma's inauguration, but the National Congress received a total of 2,000 guests for the ceremony. According to press reports, between 14 and 17 heads of state and government confirmed their attendance. Among them were José Sócrates, Juan Manuel Santos, Mauricio Funes, Alan García, José Mujica, Hugo Chávez, Álvaro Colom, Alpha Condé, Sebastián Piñera, Evo Morales (but he was unable to attend due to last-minute protests in Bolívia) and Boyko Borisov. US President Barack Obama sent Secretary of State Hillary Rodham Clinton to represent him. The former Prime Minister of Japan, Tarō Asō, also attended the ceremony.

In addition to the formal ceremony, Dilma's inauguration also featured performances by five Brazilian singers: Elba Ramalho, Fernanda Takai, Zélia Duncan, Mart'nália and Gaby Amarantos. The Ministry of Culture organized the cultural part of the event with an estimated budget of 1.5 million reais. The concerts began at 10:00, ended at 14:00 with the start of the official ceremony, and continued after 18:00. Dilma did not attend, as she held a reception at the Itamaraty Palace for the foreign authorities attending the swearing-in ceremony, with each one able to speak to her for 30 seconds.

==== "Presidenta" ====
Brazil was the first Portuguese-speaking country to have a woman elected to the position of head of state (although Carmen Pereira served as interim president of Guinea-Bissau between 14–16 May 1984). The cultured norm of the Portuguese language accepts both spellings – presidente and presidenta – as correct and acceptable. As early as 1889, Cândido de Figueiredo's Novo Dicionário da Língua Portuguesa used the term "presidenta" to mean a woman who presides, and other dictionaries also followed suit; for example, according to the Dicionário Houaiss da Língua Portuguesa, "presidenta" is the feminine form of president, although it is less common. The Dicionário Aurélio, on the other hand, states that the word can be used in the masculine and feminine, referring to "presidenta" as "wife of the president" or "woman who presides". The Dicionário Michaelis and the Dicionário Brasileiro Globo also give the same meaning as the Aurélio.

In 2011, Dilma said she preferred to be addressed by the feminine inflected form “presidenta”. In 2016, she criticized the decision by EBC (Empresa Brasil de Comunicação), which controls state-owned media outlets, to discontinue using the term “presidenta” to distinguish the gender of the office of the President of the Republic in reports. The media have not established any standardization, but despite Dilma's declaration, a considerable number of newspapers, magazines and blogs have preferred to use the word presidente, which is applicable to both genders.

=== Second term ===
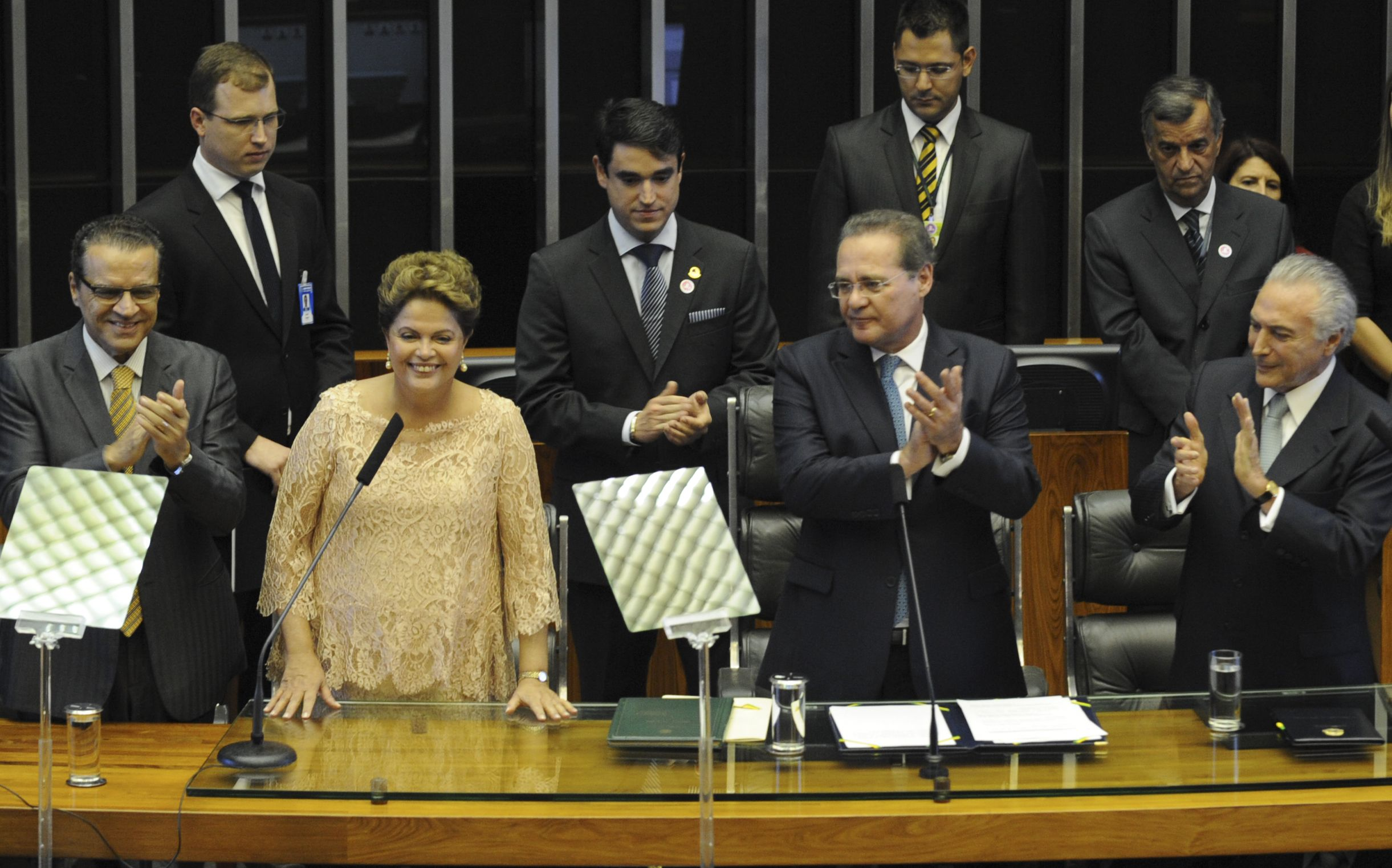
Dilma during the Constitutional Commitment ceremony, the reading of the Term of office and the address to the National Congress

Dilma's re-election was announced at 8:27 p.m. on 26 October 2014, when 98% of the polls had already been counted. On the same day, in her first speech after being re-elected, she declared in Brasília that she would be open to dialog, that her re-election was a "vote of hope given by the people" and that "the first and most important" reform she intends to carry out will be political. According to Luiz Inácio Lula da Silva, Dilma was sad to be re-elected.

==== Investiture ceremony ====
Dilma was sworn as president for a second term on 1 January 2015, in a solemn session in the Chamber of Deputies, attended by the President of the Senate, Renan Calheiros, the President of the Chamber, Henrique Eduardo Alves, and the President of the Supreme Federal Court, Ricardo Lewandowski. At the event, she announced the motto of her new government: "Brasil, Pátria Educadora".

== Cabinet ==
=== First term ===
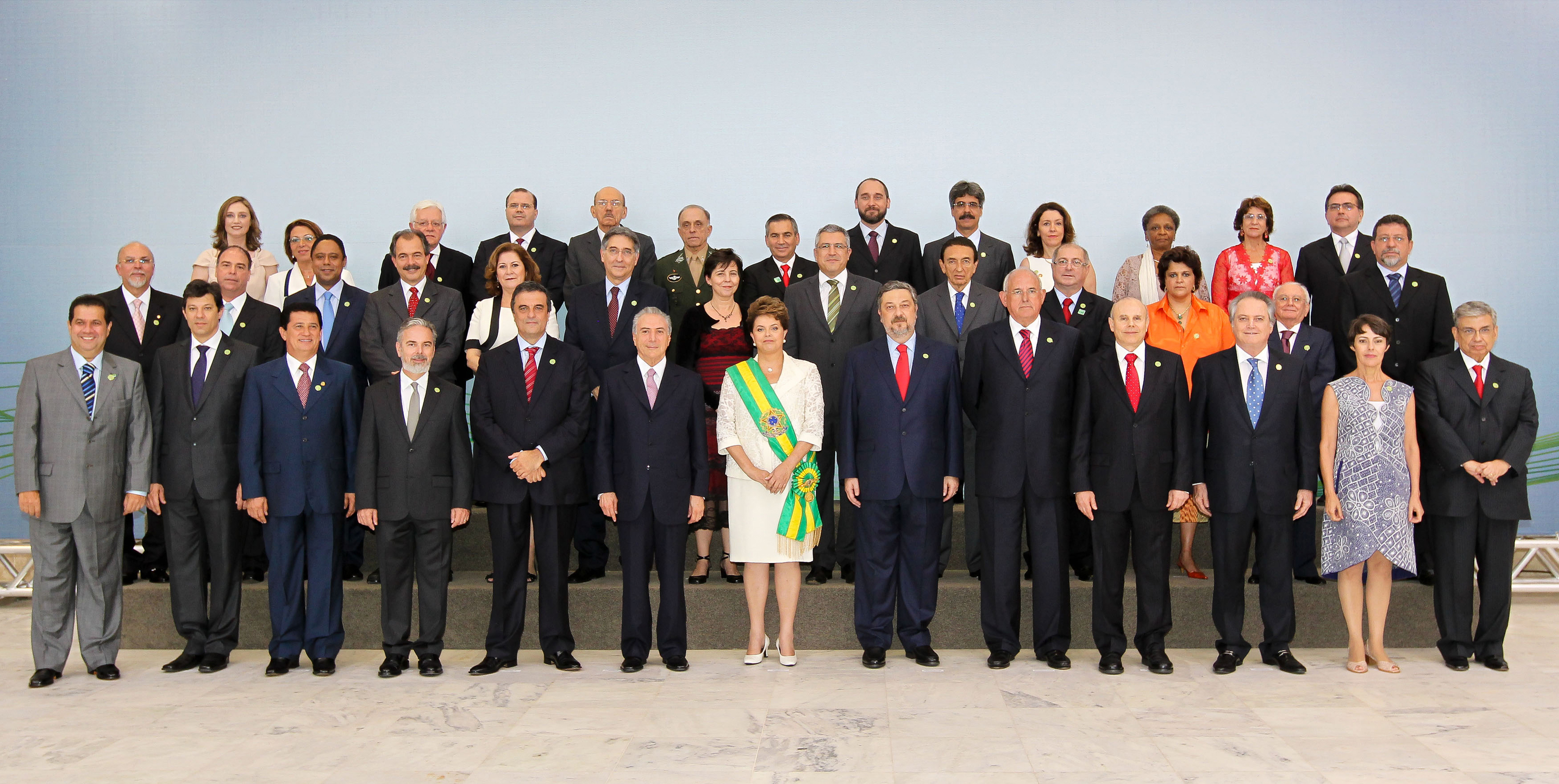
Official photo of President Dilma Rousseff and vice president Temer with the 37 ministers sworn in on 1 January 2011

=== Second term ===
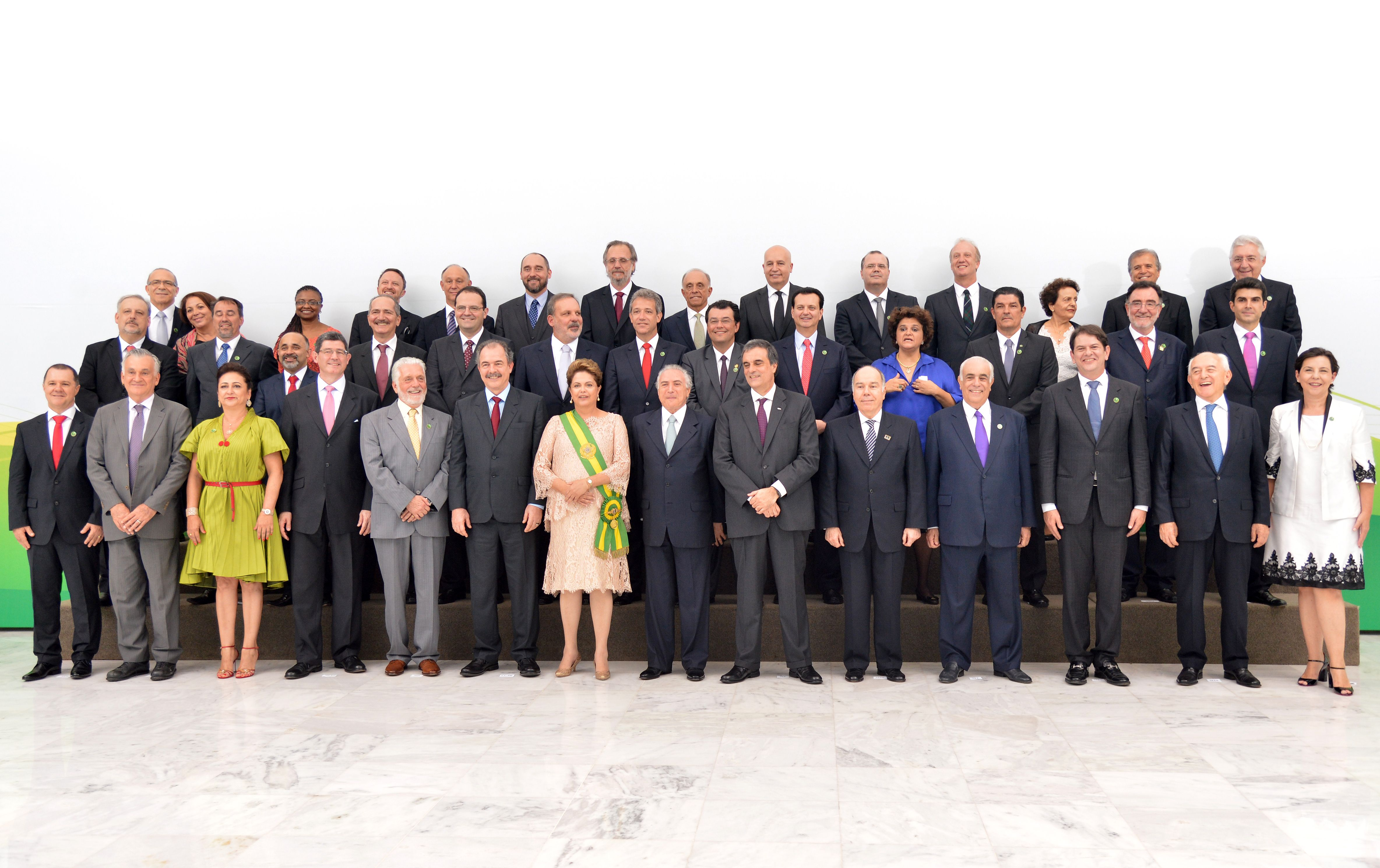
Official photo of President Dilma Rousseff and vice president Temer with the ministers sworn in, 1 January 2015

== Domestic politics ==
=== Economic management ===
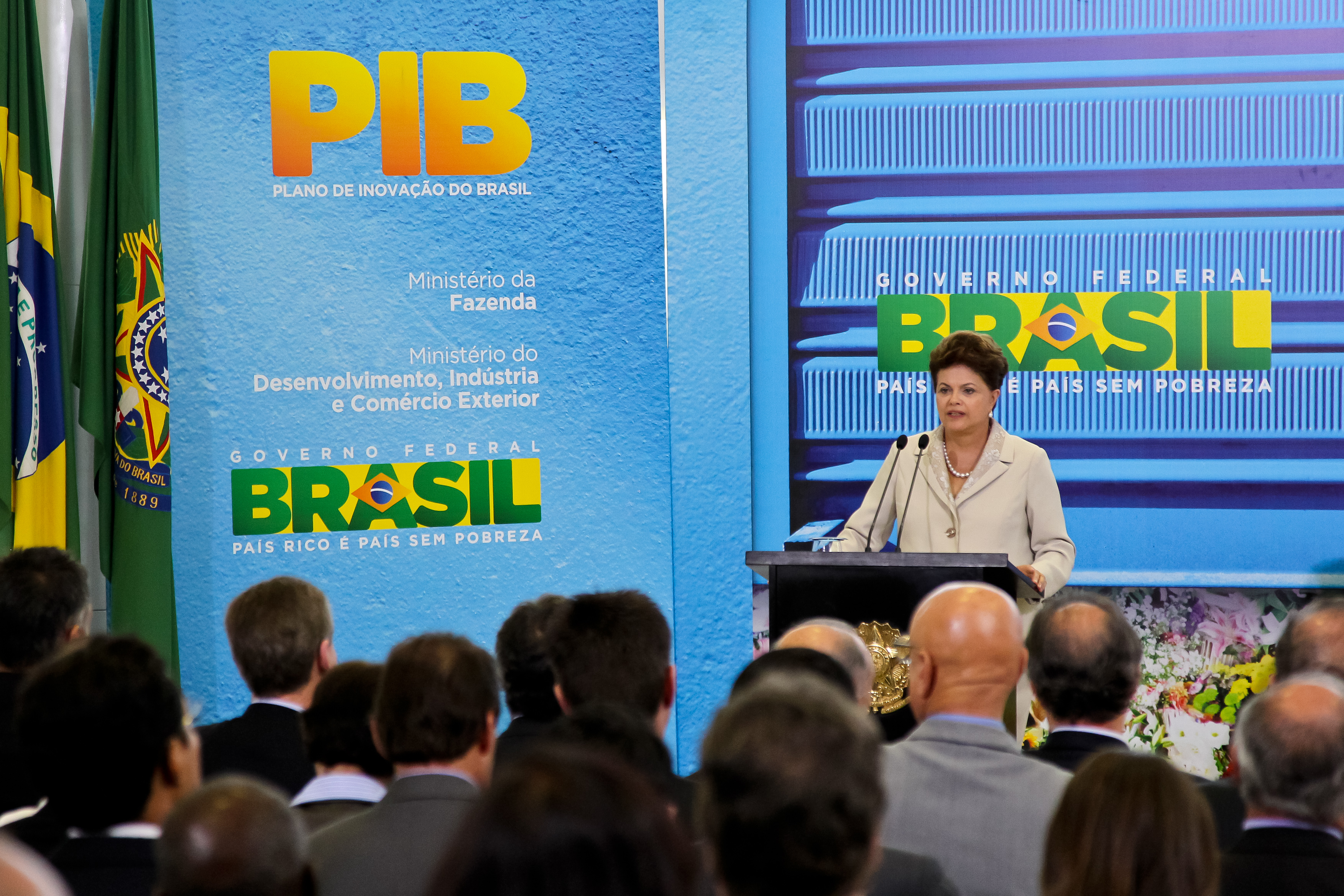
Dilma and her ministers attend the ceremony to sign an agreement between the Mixed Parliamentary Front for Micro and Small Companies and the federal government on improving the General Law for Micro and Small Companies, at the Planalto Palace

Dilma's management of the Brazilian economy began as a continuation of the policy adopted by the Lula government. Dilma was expected to be influenced by her predecessor, but she soon revealed her own idealism and leadership style, although Lula remained an influencer until the end of her government. Her government began with the departure of Henrique Meirelles from the presidency of the Central Bank, after eight years at the head of the institution, and the return of Alexandre Tombini, who, in his inauguration speech, defended a solid and efficient financial system as a condition for sustainable growth. Dilma opted for Guido Mantega as finance minister.

A study of the government's first year in office, conducted by the Centre for Research and Support for Workers in partnership with the Humanitas Institute of Unisinos, found that the principles that guided its initial actions derived from a developmentalist or interventionist model, in which the state plays an important role in regulating and fostering economic growth, as well as defining strategies for growth.

Despite the initial crisis she faced with her ministers, the government was not deeply damaged. Some major economic difficulties arose from the change in the international context, reducing the favourable environment for national growth that Lula had found in his first government, and bringing unexpected challenges to the original plans, lowering expectations.

=== Macroeconomics ===
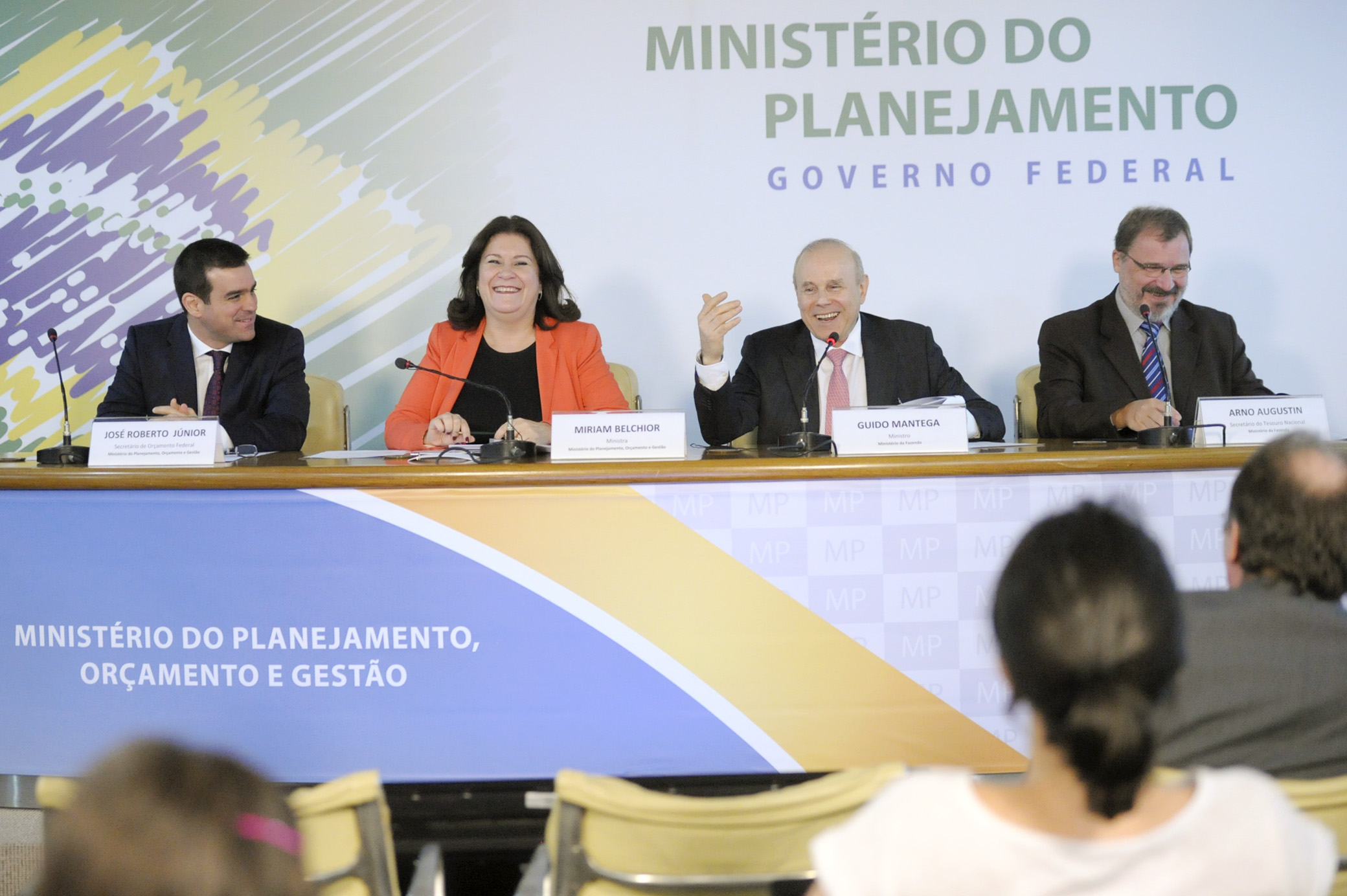
The Minister of Planning, Miriam Belchior, and the Minister of Finance, Guido Mantega, hold a press conference

Measures were implemented at the beginning of Dilma's government that included policies of strong public intervention in the economy, combining monetary policy with a reduction in interest rates and fiscal policy with control in investment, increased spending, subsidies and intervention in prices. This policy became known as the new economic matrix and was identified as one of the causes of the 2014 crisis.

Between 2010 and 2014, Brazil was the country that dropped the most positions in the world competitiveness ranking, falling from 38th place to 54th among the 60 economies analysed by the International Institute for Management Development (IMD) and the Fundação Dom Cabral. The study evaluated the conditions offered by countries so that the companies that operate in them can be successful nationally and internationally, promoting growth and improvements in the living conditions of their population. The criteria assessed in the analysis are: economic performance, infrastructure and the efficiency of their governments and companies.

During Dilma's first term in office, Brazil achieved the best competitiveness index in an annual list published by the World Economic Forum, which analyses 118 variables grouped into 12 different categories. In the meantime, in 2012, Brazil's trade balance recorded a surplus of US$19.43 billion. Compared to 2011, when the positive balance totaled US$29.79 billion, there was a drop of 34.75%, the worst performance in 10 years.

In the following years, the results were even weaker. In 2013, the Brazilian trade balance had a surplus of US$2.56 billion, the worst result for a year since 2000, when there was a deficit of US$731 million. In 2014, there was a deficit of US$3.93 billion, the first since 2000.

Also in 2013, according to the Central Bank, the current account of Brazil, one of the main indicators of the state of the Brazilian economy (a figure which includes the results of the trade balance and other unrelated operations involving the inflow or outflow of capital – services and income), closed 2013 with an unprecedented deficit of US$81.37 billion. As a result, the deficit surpassed the negative result recorded in 2012 (-US$54.23 billion, an all-time record for a closed year), with an increase of 50%. In 2014, the deficit was even higher: US$90.9 billion (later revised to US$103.98 billion).

=== Budget ===
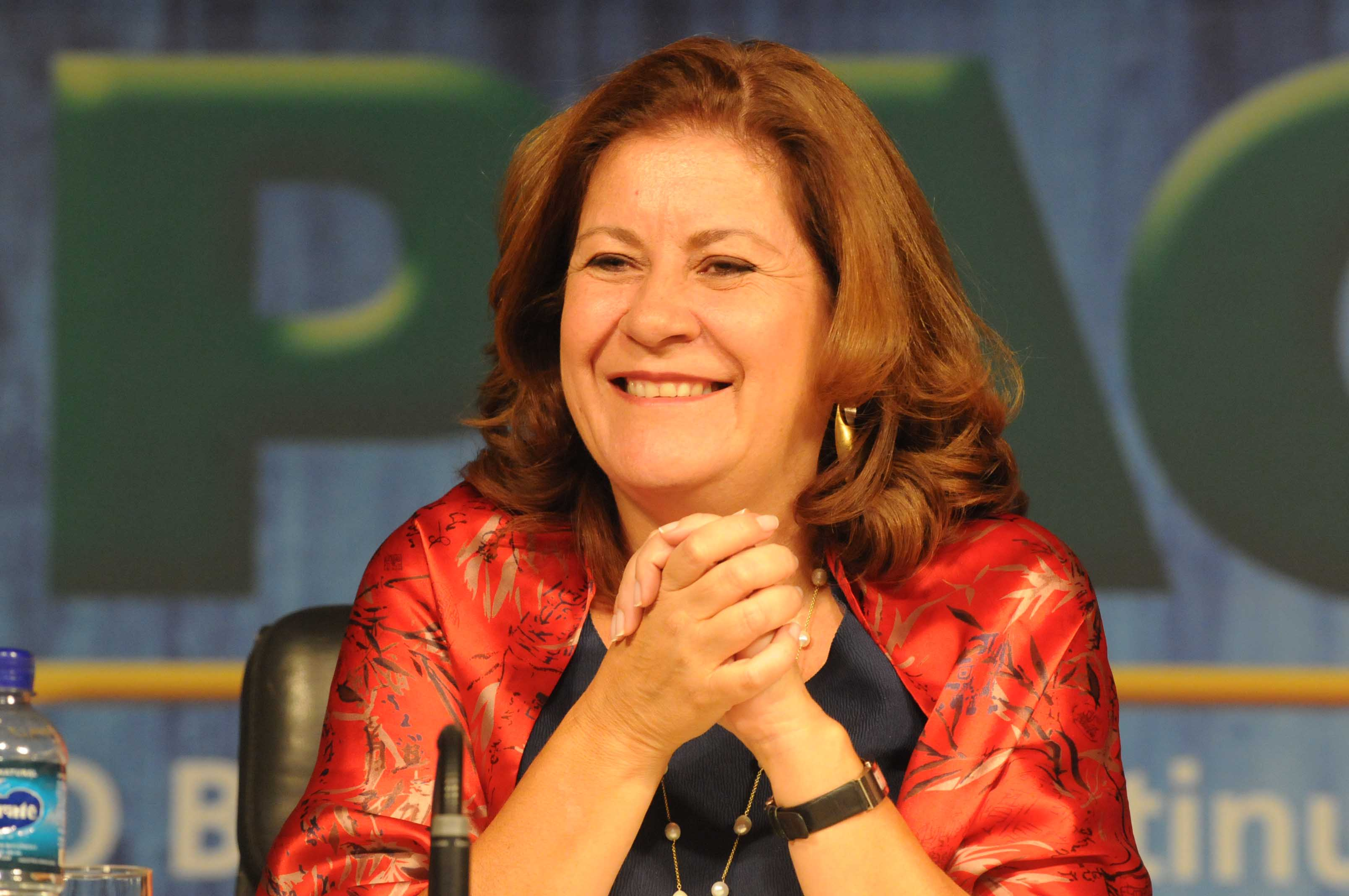
Miriam Belchior, then Minister of Planning, Budget and Management

In February 2011, the government announced a record R$50 billion cut in the federal budget for the same year, equivalent to 1.2% of the gross domestic product (GDP). The justification for the cut was that the spending block was a way for the government to try to combat inflationary pressures, and consequently allow a "softer" policy for the basic interest rate. Minister of Finance Guido Mantega also explained that the measure was also part of the process of reversing all the stimuli made to the Brazilian economy between 2009 and 2010 to avoid the negative effects of the 2008 financial crisis. During the election campaign in which she emerged victorious, both Dilma and her opponent José Serra denied that they would make adjustments of this kind to the public accounts.

In the record budget cut, the Minha Casa, Minha Vida Programme received a reduction of more than R$5 billion in government transfers, despite the government's claim that spending on social programmes and PAC (Programa de Aceleração do Crescimento) investments would be fully maintained. According to Miriam Belchior, Dilma's chosen Minister for Planning, Budget and Management, the reduction in spending was related to the fact that the second part of Minha Casa Minha Vida has not yet been approved by Congress. The programme aimed to provide two million homes by 2014, 60% of them for low-income families.

Dilma suspended the hiring of those approved in public tenders and the holding of new selection processes during 2011, as a way of containing government spending, which had been considered high in years leading up to it. Nothing was said about the suspension during her campaign.

==== Economic development and innovation data ====
The Programa de Aceleração do Crescimento 2 was launched on 29 March 2010 and provided for resources in the order of R$1.59 trillion in a series of segments, such as transport, energy, culture, the environment, health, social areas and housing. There are 6 areas of investment in PAC 2: Cidade Melhor, Comunidade Cidadã, Minha Casa, Minha Vida, Água e Luz Para Todos (expansion of Luz para Todos), Transportation and Energy. Sanitation was also included, with a total investment of R$2.8 billion for 635 municipalities throughout the country.

Data from the 8th PAC 2 balance sheet revealed that "of the total R$665 billion invested up to 31 August 2013, R$217.4 billion (33.2%) refers to housing finance. Another 178.3 billion (27.2%) was invested by state-owned companies, including Petrobras. The private sector was responsible for R$129.9 billion (19.8%), and the Minha Casa, Minha Vida Program for another R$60.3 billion in investments (9.2%)". For official sources, the programme had contracted 3.2 million housing units by March 2014, with investments of R$205 billion.

The Brazilian Association of Infrastructure and Basic Industries (ABDIB), which brings together major infrastructure companies, said in an official statement that, for several reasons, the model of favouring management and public budget resources to expand infrastructure in recent years has been outdated. According to the association, two successive programmes – PAC 1 and PAC 2 – brought some innovations in control and risk analysis, but still failed to significantly meet the expected results.

In the opinion of Michael Reid, one of the editors of The Economist magazine, PAC 2 had brought more problems than solutions. In an interview in October 2013, he said:

Brazil came through the 2008 financial crisis well, but then started to go off the rails a bit. Partly because all over the world the forces behind the wave of growth began to run out of steam. But I also think that the government has learned the wrong lesson from the crisis, that the solution lies in state capitalism, as the Beijing Consensus says (the nickname given to the Chinese growth model, which involves principles of economic openness and a lot of state intervention in the economy). That's why there's a very negative business mood at the moment.

Logo and slogan (País rico é país sem pobreza) from Dilma's first term in office

Despite the investment and infrastructure programmes, the third edition of the report produced by the world business school Insead, in partnership with the Confederation of Indian Industry (CII), carried out in 2010, showed that Brazil was in 68th place in the 2010 world innovation ranking; Iceland, Sweden and Hong Kong as the three most innovative in the world. Among Latin American countries, Brazil came 7th, losing out to nations such as Costa Rica, Chile and Uruguay. The survey ranked 132 countries based on 60 different indicators, such as patents per million inhabitants, investments in research and development, broadband internet and cell phone users per 100 people and the average time it takes to start a business in the country. The study also measures the impact of innovation on social welfare, including data on spending on education, GDP per capita and the Gini index of social inequality.

In 2013, Brazil was in 64th place in the same ranking. The indicator was released by the World Intellectual Property Organization (WIPO), Cornell University (USA) and INSEAD. The ranking considers 84 indicators to evaluate elements of the national economy that favour innovation activities, such as institutions, human capital and research, infrastructure, business improvement, as well as evidence manifested in knowledge and technology and creative results. The five countries considered to be innovation champions are Switzerland, Sweden, the United Kingdom, the Netherlands and the USA.

For Aloizio Mercadante, former Minister of Science and Technology and Education,

In the last decade we have built macroeconomic stability, with 350 billion dollars in foreign exchange reserves, reduced public debt from 65% to 35% of GDP, stabilized democracy, the division of powers and freedom of the press; we are a country that hasn't had a conflict with its neighbors for 140 years. Brazil has reached the position of the world's sixth largest economy with a series of values that the world admires. The big difference was having included 40 million people in the consumer market and this is fundamental because, in this crisis, there is no way to grow outwards because of the situation in the Eurozone, the difficulty of the American economy to resume faster growth and, above all, the Asian slowdown. Our anchor is the growth of the domestic market and that means jobs and wages. Brazil is going to have to make an adjustment to increase its competitiveness, and President Dilma is taking a series of measures to increase the systemic efficiency of the Brazilian economy.

=== GDP ===
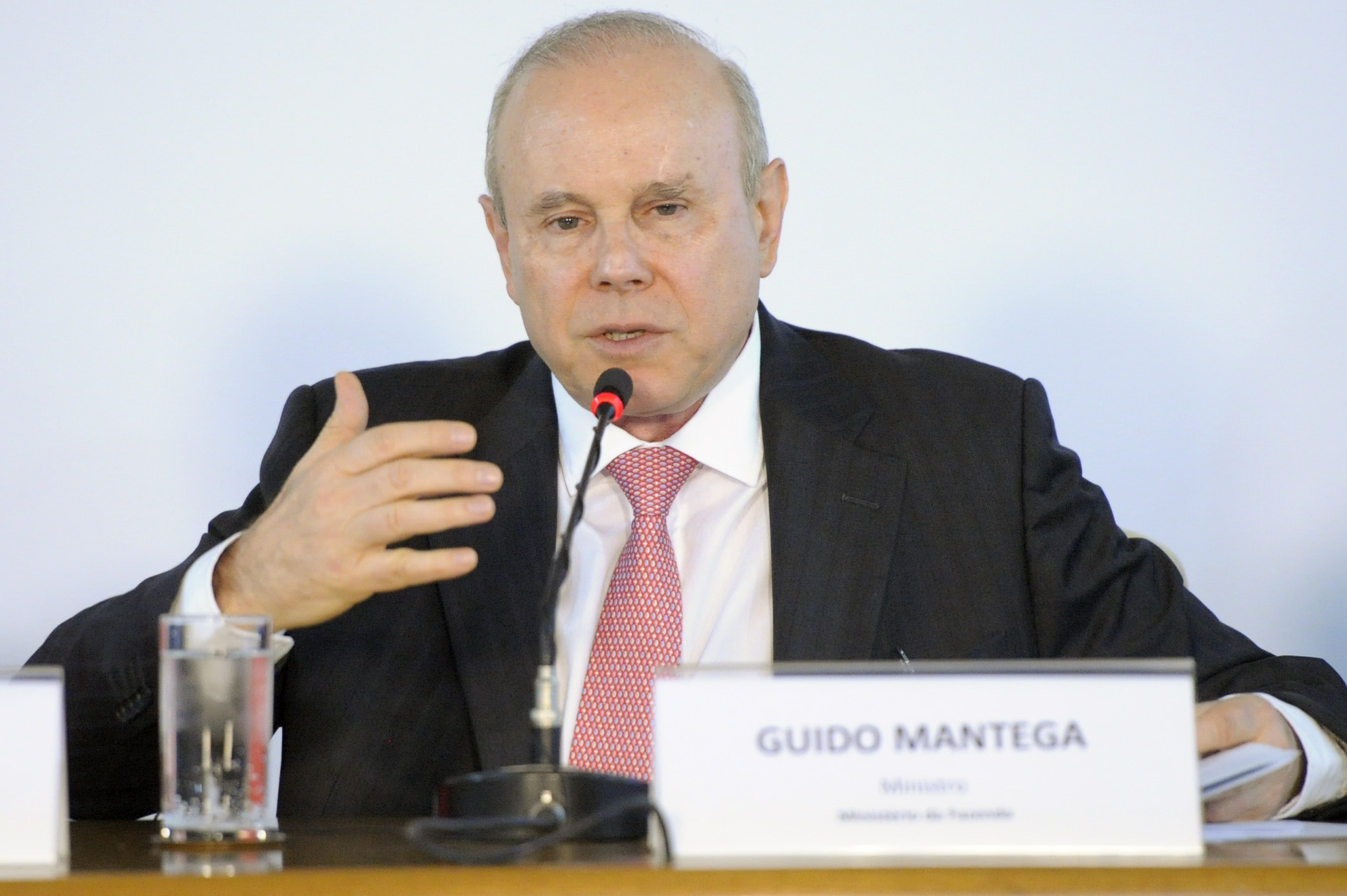
Guido Mantega, finance minister during Dilma's first term as well as Lula's second

In June 2011, the IBGE released the first GDP figures of the Dilma government. According to the institute, the Brazilian economy grew by 1.3% in the first quarter of 2011 compared to the fourth quarter of 2010, when GDP had expanded by 0.8% over the third quarter. Compared to the first quarter of 2010, GDP grew by 4.20%. On 26 December, several British newspapers reported that Brazil had overtaken the United Kingdom to become the world's sixth largest economy, the first time that Brazil's GDP had surpassed the UK's. The data comes from the Centre for Economics and Business Research.

In March 2012, the IBGE reported that the GDP in Dilma's first year in office grew by 2.7%, a performance below that expected by the financial market and by sectors of the government, such as the Ministry of Finance, which had forecast an expansion of around 3% for 2011. In 2012, GDP grew by 0.9%, also below what the market and the government expected at the start of the year. The figure was later revised to a 1% expansion, according to the IBGE.

In 2013, despite the unfavourable scenario experienced by most of the world's economies, GDP grew by 2.3%. The result was below the government's initial estimates for the year, but surprised financial market economists, who were expecting a smaller expansion. In relation to the 13 main world economies that released their 2013 results, Brazil had the third highest growth – behind only China (7.7%) and South Korea (2.8%).

Representing the financial market, Monica Baumgarten de Bolle, a professor at PUC-RJ and director of the Galanto consultancy, said that the better-than-expected performance of the economy in 2013 could dispel the pessimistic assessments that were beginning to emerge in the country. She said:

This will create a reality shock for the country's economy. Pessimism does not result in recession or a fall in GDP.

Between 2011 and 2013, Brazil's economic growth averaged 2%, the lowest among the main emerging economies. According to IMF estimates, world GDP increased by an average of 3.3% over these three years.

On 11 March 2015, the IBGE released GDP results based on a new methodology, as recommended by the European Commission, IMF, UN and World Bank. Economic growth in 2011 went from 2.7% to 3.9% and in 2012 and 2013, from 1% and 2.5% to 1.8% and 2.7% respectively. The 2014 GDP, which was released using the new methodology, grew by 0.1%, resulting in an average of 2.2% per year in the first term, the lowest since the Collor government.

According to a 2014 report by the International Monetary Fund, Brazil was the 62nd country in the world in the GDP per capita ranking (which is the final value of goods and services produced in a country in a given year, divided by the population of that same year), with a value of US$11,310 per inhabitant. The USA is in 8th place with US$54,980 per inhabitant, Germany in 18th with US$44,999 per inhabitant, and Japan in 25th with US$39,100 per inhabitant.

=== Taxation ===
On 8 March 2013, Dilma surprised her own party by announcing a tax cut on the basic food basket on television. She declared that "by cutting taxes on the basic food basket, the government will give up 7.4 billion reais in revenue per year". Other tax breaks, such as IPI and payroll tax, had also been made during his term in office. The telecommunications sector was also granted tax breaks to encourage improvements in the sector's infrastructure to implement 4G technology.

Under the Dilma government, the tax burden rose every year. The last time there was a reduction was in 2009, due to a drop in revenue caused by the global crisis, temporarily falling from 34.4% to 33.5% of GDP. In 2014, the tax burden reached 36.3% of GDP, an all-time high and the second highest in Latin America.

In 2014, after four years of Dilma's government, for the fifth time in a row, a survey carried out by the Brazilian Institute of Planning and Taxation (IBPT) named Brazil as the country with the worst tax return to the population. The study compares the 30 countries with the highest tax burden in relation to GDP; Brazil's tax burden exceeds 35% of GDP. For the president of IBPT, the study reinforces and shows the need to demand better use of the resources paid by taxpayers: "Brazilians recently took to the streets in protests in which the banners also showed their dissatisfaction with the high tax burden and the limited quality of life".

=== Inflation ===
Despite still being within the National Monetary Council (CMN) target of 4.5%, with a tolerance of 2 points up or down, the National Broad Consumer Price Index (IPCA) for 2010 (the last year of the previous government) registered an accumulated increase of 5.91% and was the highest since 2004. In January 2011, the first month of the Dilma government, the inflation index registered a monthly rate of 0.83%, the highest result since April 2005 (0.87%), which brought the accumulated rate over 12 months to 5.99%.

In March 2011, with strong inflation pressure driven by prices in the Food and Transport group, the IPCA remained at a high level of 0.79%, which represented the highest rate for the month since 2003. The monthly result brought the 12-month accumulated rate to 6.30%, a level very close to the cap of the target pursued by the Central Bank, which caused concern among financial market economists and forced the government to adopt new credit restriction measures to control the economy's heat. In April, the IBGE indicator showed a slowdown, to a rate of 0.77%, but this did not prevent the accumulated result over 12 months from exceeding the cap of the inflation target. The figure reached 6.51% and represented the first breach of the level pursued by the Central Bank since June 2005.

After registering an increase of 7.31% in the accumulated 12-month period and reaching the highest mark in this comparison since May 2005, the IPCA began a slow process of deceleration in the following months. The inflation index ended 2011 with an accumulated rate of 6.50% and remained at the cap of the target set by the CMN, registering the highest annual level since 2004, when it showed a rate of 7.60%.

In 2012, official inflation registered 5.84%. Although this represents a slowdown compared to 2011, it was once again above the Central Bank's target. In December 2012 in particular, inflation rose by 0.79%, the highest since March 2011. According to the IBGE, the rise in prices at the end of the year was mainly driven by food, due to climatic problems. Domestic servants were the most expensive (12.73%), while cars fell by 5.71%.

The measures adopted decelerated inflation, although not as much as the government had planned, ending 2011 with an accumulated rate of 6.50%, at the cap of the target set by the National Monetary Council. Despite facing difficulties, in June 2011 the IBGE presented positive policy results, indicating growth of 1.3% in the first quarter of the year. The positive performance placed the country in the position of the sixth largest economy in the world. Throughout her government, official expectations of growth generally fell, with rates below those forecast. The first year of her term resulted in growth of 2.7%, in 2012 the economy grew by 0.9%, and in 2013 GDP grew by 2.3%. In 2013 the country ranked third in growth rate among the 13 main world economies.

However, in 2013 official inflation was higher than expected by the market in general. The Broad National Consumer Price Index (IPCA) closed the year at 5.91%, higher than the financial market's estimate of 5.74%. In December 2013, the index accelerated to 0.92%, and had the highest monthly increase since April 2003, when it reached 0.97%. It was also the highest December figure since 2002, when it reached 2.1%. In 2015, official inflation had exceeded double digits, when it reached 10.67%.

=== Interest rates ===
The Dilma government raised interest rates as an initial measure to prevent inflation from reaching uncomfortable levels to meet the 2011 target set by the Central Bank. At the very first Copom meeting, the Central Bank's board of directors raised the SELIC rate by 0.50 percentage points to 11.25%, the highest level since March 2009. At the second meeting of the Central Bank committee, interest rates were raised again by 0.50 percentage points, now to 11.75% per year, the highest level since the 12.75% of January 2009. In April, a further 0.25 percentage point adjustment to the Selic brought the rate to 12% per year. With this increase, Brazil continued to lead the world with the highest real interest rates. The position was maintained after the June and July Copom meetings, which promoted two more 0.25 percentage point increases and took the Selic to 12.50%.

At the August Copom meeting, the Central Bank's board of directors surprised the financial market with a 0.50 percentage point cut in the Selic rate, to 12% per year, while all economists were working to maintain the Selic rate at 12.50%. The justification given by the directors of the monetary authority was that the international crisis experienced by central economies, such as those in Europe, would have an influence on the Brazilian economy. The Central Bank's decision was criticized by the financial market and opposition parties. They raised the hypothesis of a loss of independence for the monetary authority, given that, a few days before the decision to reduce interest rates, Dilma had stated that she was beginning to see the possibility of reducing interest rates in Brazil. Minister of Finance Guido Mantega refuted the criticism of the Central Bank, dismissing the hypothesis of political interference in Copom's decision.

After the August 2011 interest rate cut, to stimulate economic activity, the Central Bank promoted a strong reduction in monetary policy, with further reductions in the Selic rate, which in October 2012 fell to 7.25%, the lowest level in history. Until April 2013, when it rose to 7.50%, interest rates in Brazil remained unchanged. After this period, to avoid inflationary pressures that threatened compliance with the target set by the CMN, Copom began a process of monetary tightening, with consecutive interest rate hikes that brought the Selic rate to 10.75% in February 2014, the same level that Dilma found at the start of her term.

With the basic interest rate (Selic) at 10.75% per year, Brazil remains at the top of the ranking of countries with the highest real interest rates in the world, while the basic interest rate stood at 4.48%. In second place was China, with a real rate of 3.41%. Third was Turkey, with 3.09%, followed by India (2.86%) and Hungary (1.28%).

=== Energy generation ===
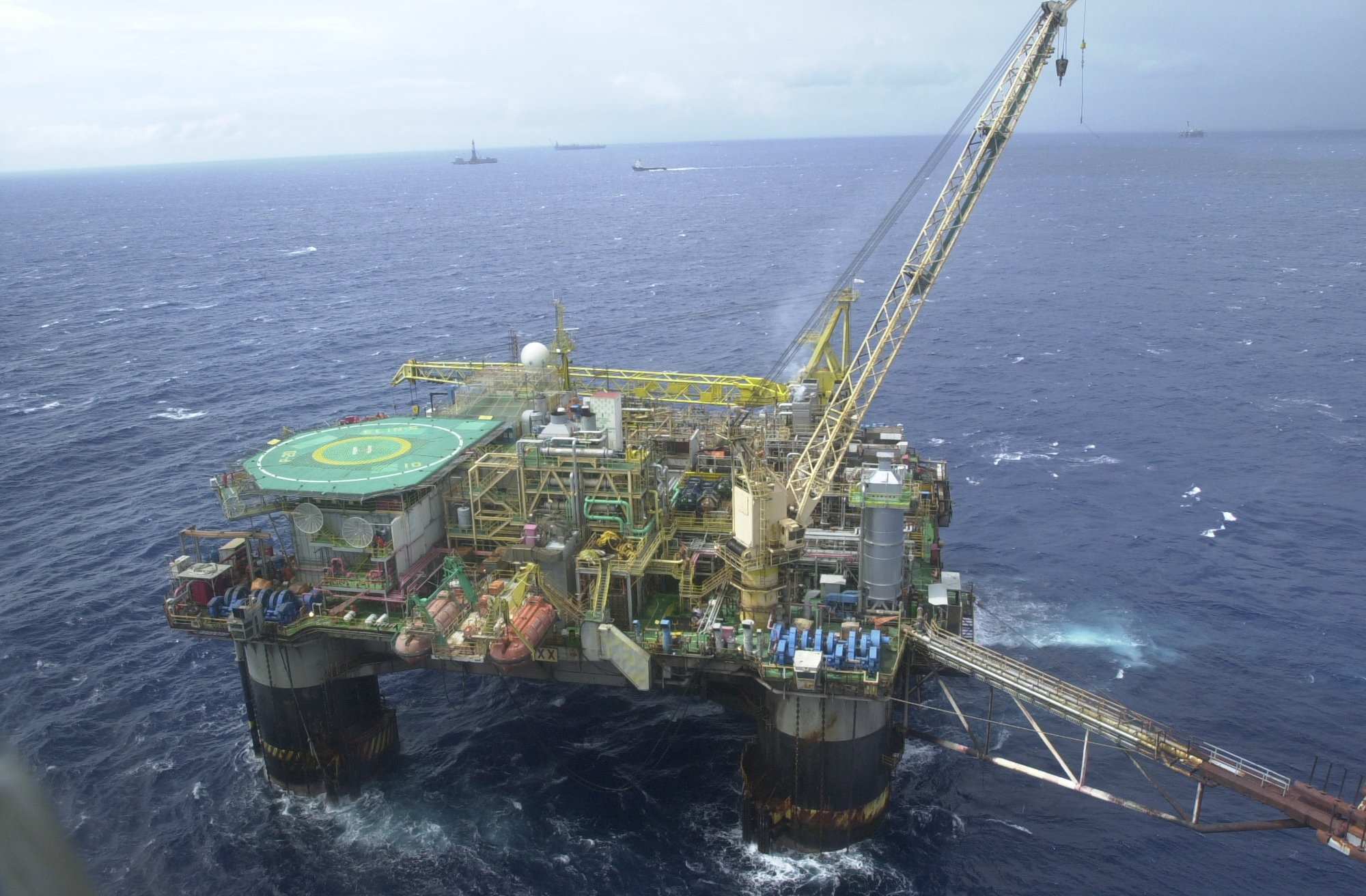
Petrobras' P-20 oil platform: deep-water oil exploration has made the company a world reference

The Dilma government stimulated the energy sector, providing incentives for research and production of oil and coal, the construction of hydroelectric dams and the development of alternative energy sources, such as biodiesel and sugarcane alcohol. Brazil has achieved international prominence in several programmes, such as deep-water oil research and alcohol production. The environmental and agrarian issue is related to this field, as Brazil has been historically ineffective in combating threats to its ecosystem. In addition to alternative investments, other lines of action have been noted by the government, such as Brazil's connections with the problem of climate change.

Brazil gained international prominence in the negotiations on warming policies, proposing voluntary targets for reducing greenhouse gas emissions, and was praised by the UN for its reduction in historical rates of deforestation, but the effectiveness of the results of recent environmental policies has raised discussion and controversy. Agribusiness, one of the strengths of the Dilma government, contributed 100 billion dollars in exports to the country and was a sector with great political influence, especially due to its strong presence in Congress as an allied base of the then president (the so-called Parliamentary Agricultural Front). However, the sector has interests that often diverge from those of environmentalists, leading to a series of conflicts, sometimes violent, which are aggravated by the demands of other sectors of society, such as the landless and indigenous peoples.

=== Microeconomics ===
==== Relations with the private sector and concessions ====
In February 2012, the Dilma government awarded control of three Brazilian airports to the private sector; the Invepar consortium won the bid for Guarulhos Airport, Viracopos Airport was awarded to the Aeroportos Brasil group, and the Inframerica Aeroportos group was assigned to the Juscelino Kubitschek Airport in Brasília. In August 2012, her government carried out a 153 million construction project at Galeão Airport before privatizing it, but the Civil Aviation Union filed a lawsuit against the government. The concession for Campinas airport was expected to last 30 years, Brasília for 25 years and Guarulhos for 20 years. Infraero, the state-owned company, will hold up to 49% of the capital of each airport.

The operating licence for Guarulhos airport was put up for auction for a minimum price of R$3.4 billion and was sold for R$16.213 billion, with a premium of 373%. The Campinas licence was offered for R$1.47 billion and won for R$3.821 billion (a 159.8% premium). Brasília, offered at R$582 million, was bought with a premium of 673%, for R$4.501 billion. In addition to paying for the licences, each concessionaire will have to invest a minimum of R$1.38 billion by 2014 in the case of Guarulhos, R$873 million in the case of Viracopos and R$626 million in Brasília. The auction notices also include requirements regarding the quality of the services that will have to be provided, including quotas in parking lots, chairs in waiting rooms and longer queues at service points. However, it was estimated that the investment needed to adapt the airports to the volume of traffic expected over the next few years, with the World cup and Olympics, would be R$4.6 billion for Guarulhos airport, R$8.7 billion for Campinas and R$2.8 billion for Brasilia. In addition, public concessions have been granted for oil basins and means of transportation.

==== Energy tariff ====
In January 2013, in a national radio and television address, Dilma announced a cut in energy tariffs of 18% for households and 32% for industries. The measure was possible through an agreement with the energy transmission companies, which agreed to the price reduction as long as the government paid compensation for improvements carried out on the grid before 2000. The payment was calculated at R$62.2 billion in 2017 and will be diluted in consumers' electricity bills until 2025. The opposition accused the president of electoral fraud, claiming that it was a maneuver to reduce electricity bills on the eve of the 2014 presidential campaign, but with the compensation provided, consumers would suffer an increase after the elections.

==== Minimum wage ====
In February 2011, the National Congress approved the proposal stipulated by the Dilma government to increase the minimum wage from R$510 to R$545, despite the opposition parties' suggestion of R$560 and R$600. The adjustment was higher than the accumulated inflation of 2010, when the INPC was 6.47%, but received criticism from sectors of civil society. Experts point out that, if projections for the INPC for the first two months of the year are confirmed, the R$545 would have had 1.3% less purchasing power in March, the month it came into force, than in January 2010, when the Lula government made the last adjustment. An increase to R$552 would be necessary to replace 14 months' inflation. With inflation in the first two months of the year confirming expectations of a more intense rise, it was the first annual adjustment of the minimum below inflation since 1997.

In December 2011, Dilma signed a decree readjusting the minimum wage by 14.13%. As a result, as of January of the following year, the new minimum wage was R$622. According to a study by DIEESE, the increase led to the minimum wage's purchasing power reaching its highest level in more than 30 years. According to the institution, considering the value of the basic food basket calculated in November by the organization (R$276.31), the new floor could buy 2.25 baskets, the highest amount recorded since 1979. Also according to DIEESE, the R$77 increase determined by the president caused an extra annual expense of R$19.8 billion for Social Security. However, this cost was less than the increase in tax collection, since, due to the growth in consumption resulting from the increase in the minimum wage, the forecast was that tax collection would rise by R$22.9 billion in 2012.

==== Economic assistance measures ====
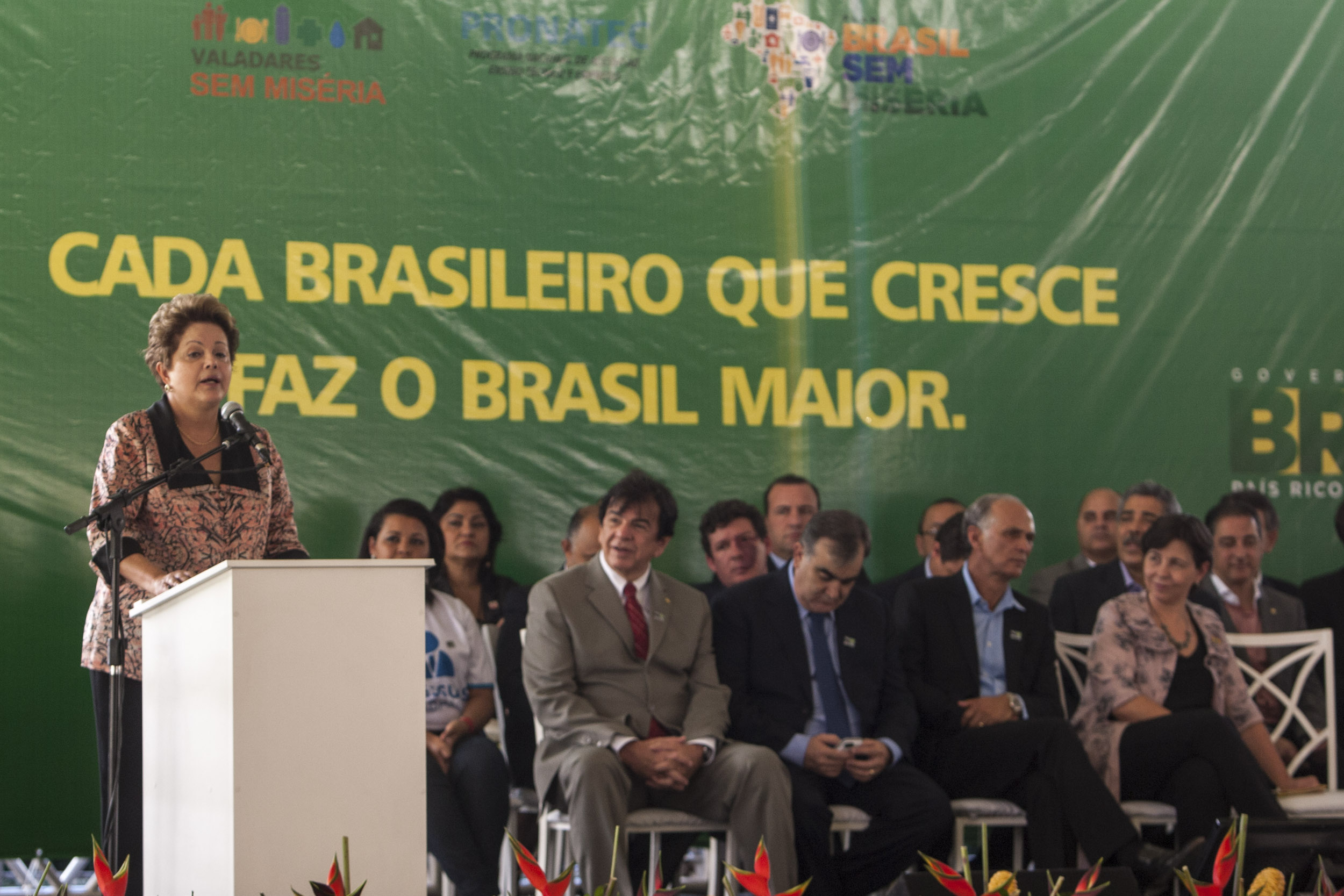
Dilma and the Minister of Social Development, Tereza Campello, participate in the graduation of Pronatec students aimed at the low-income public, who were part of the Brasil sem Miséria Plan

Brasil sem Miséria was a government plan with associated projects to address specific areas of the family economy, such as Bolsa Família, which granted beneficiaries from R$77.01 to R$154, depending on the number of dependents and the degree of poverty. According to Tereza Campello, former Minister of Social Development and Fight against Hunger, the programme was a success, lifting 22 million Brazilians above the poverty line:

It was the end of misery, from the point of view of income, for the Bolsa Família public. [...] This new political project alleviated poverty, empowered women, improved living conditions in the Northeast, took children to school and had a positive impact on the health of children and pregnant women. [...] The income of the poorest grew by 6.4% in relation to that of the richest, the minimum wage increased by 72% above inflation and more than 20 million formal jobs were created in these 10 years.

Francisco Diniz Bezerra, a specialist at Banco do Nordeste, stated that "beneficiaries tend to consume goods produced nationally, helping to strengthen the country's productive sector, stimulating the internal market and creating a mass consumer demand".

The government has created other programmes, such as the Microempreendedor Individual, aimed at fostering small markets and providing technical and managerial assistance to micro-enterprises, present in 4,000 municipalities and, according to the Minister of Education, Henrique Paim, covering more than 6 million people by March 2014; and the Água para Todos, whose goal in 2014 was to build 750,000 cisterns and 6,000 collective supply systems for consumption, especially in the semi-arid region, had 725,820 families served by October of that year.

==== Trade ====
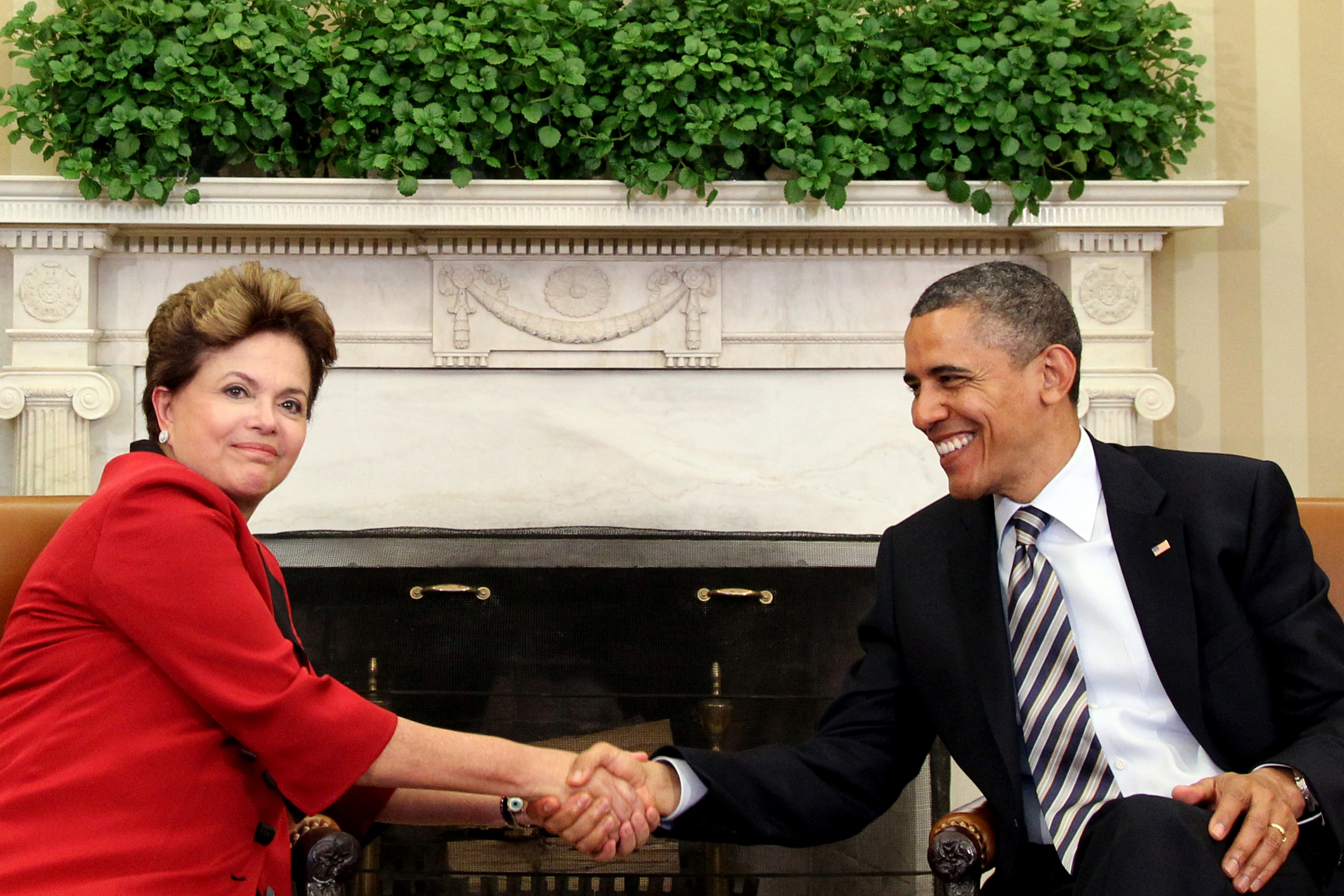
Dilma and Obama at a meeting in Washington, 9 April 2012

In April 2011, Dilma travelled to China to expand business in the country, allowing for the production of Embraer aircraft, as well as gaining unprecedented approval for the export of pork, with the licencing of three meatpacking plants. In all, more than 20 commercial agreements were signed, with Huawei announcing investments of US$350 million in Brazil. On a brief visit to Uruguay in May 2011, she and José Mujica signed agreements involving nano, IT and biotechnology, and established projects for the installation of a 500-kilowatt transmission line between San Carlos in Uruguay and Candiota in Brazil, as well as the adoption by the Uruguayan government of the Japanese-Brazilian digital TV standard.

After receiving a record total of US$288.575 billion in foreign exchange reserves from the previous government, Dilma's government reached a total of US$300 billion in stocks at the beginning of February, representing a new historic mark. Economists believe that, while on the one hand, a high level of reserves provides the country with greater security to face external crises, on the other hand, the purchase of dollars by the Brazilian government tends to increase the country's domestic debt. According to information from the Central Bank, in 2013, Brazil's international reserves registered their first decline in 13 years, totaling US$375.79 billion, compared to US$378.61 billion at the close of 2012; the decrease was 0.74%, or US$2.81 billion. Before that, the last time reserves had fallen was in 2000, still under the Fernando Henrique Cardoso administration, when they fell by US$3.34 billion, from US$36.34 billion in 1999 to US$33 billion in 2000.

=== Second term ===
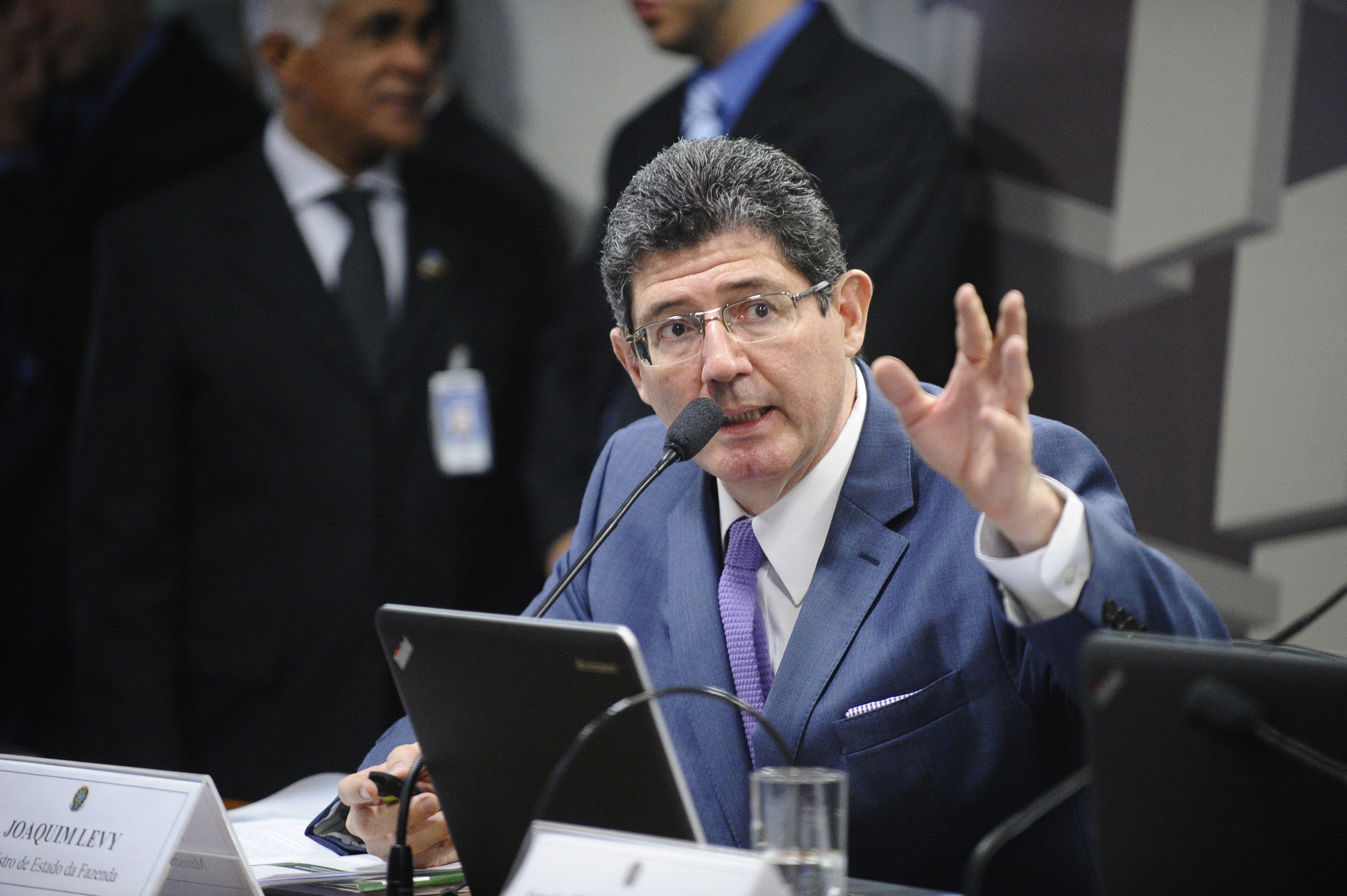
Joaquim Levy, Minister of Finance during the first year of Dilma's second term

Joaquim Levy, appointed Minister of Finance, stated at his presentation ceremony on 27 November 2014, that his immediate goal would be to set a primary surplus target for the first three years of his tenure (1.2% of GDP in 2015 and at least 2% in 2016 and 2017). He did not dismiss the possibility of budget cuts and asked for the support of the private sector to get the economy growing again. In his first two months in office, Levy adopted fiscal adjustment measures, such as MPs 664 and 665, which modify the rules for granting labour and social security benefits. When they were sent to Congress, they displeased different segments of society. Trade unions pointed out that workers' rights were being taken away and the business community disapproved of the increase in the tax burden.

In a manifesto with more than a thousand signatures, Brazilian economists opposed the contractionary measures envisaged in the fiscal adjustment, especially the adoption of a high interest rate policy. Contrary to the "discourse of financial market spokespeople who call social spending and public investment 'inflationary' at any stage of the economic cycle", the manifesto also refutes the argument that associates inflation with public spending represented by tax breaks that reduce tax costs and credit subsidies that reduce financial costs". The text recalls that "austerity has aggravated recession, unemployment, inequality and the fiscal problem in developed countries even though it has been accompanied by very low real interest rates and currency devaluation". The document also warns of the risk of recession due to exchange rate appreciation, stimulated by high real interest rates, and what it calls an "avalanche of imports".

Levy was criticized by PT parliamentarians and trade unions, but said that these measures were necessary and urgent and called for swift approval by Congress, which would be essential for the country to return to growth. However, the PMDB was more receptive, welcoming Levy at the end of February 2015 to detail his economic package. At this meeting, Levy declared that the payroll tax exemption that Dilma promoted in her first term "was a joke that cost the public coffers R$25 billion a year, and studies showed that it had neither created nor protected jobs". Through his advisors, Levy apologized for the statement. Part of the economic package was the modification of the payroll tax exemption policy, which was sent to the Chamber of Deputies but returned to the government without approval.

In April 2015, the Central Bank introduced a new methodology for calculating current foreign transactions, revising the 2014 deficit to US$103.98 billion. The draft budget guidelines law for 2016, also sent to Congress in April, predicted a 0.9% drop in GDP in 2015 and real growth of 1.3%, 1.9% and 2.4% for 2016, 2017 and 2018, respectively.

==== Competitiveness and industrial production ====
Brazil, the country that lost the most positions in the world competitiveness ranking from 2010 to 2014 (it fell from 38th place to 54th among the sixty economies analysed by the International Institute for Management Development and the Fundação Dom Cabral), fell again in 2015, from 54th to 56th place in a group of 61 countries analysed. The United States remains in first place, followed by Hong Kong, Singapore, Switzerland and Canada. Among the Latin American countries, Chile, in 35th place, was the best placed. Mexico was 39th.

In April 2015, Brazilian industry declined for the 3rd month in a row and, over 12 months, the drop was 4.8%, the worst result since December 2009 (the worst level in 6 years), when the rate was 7.1%. Nineteen of the 24 activities surveyed reported a reduction in production. According to the Fundação Getulio Vargas (FGV), industry confidence in 2015 reached the lowest level in the organization's monthly historical series, which began in October 2005. Considering the previous quarterly series, the result was the worst since October 1998.

==== GDP, exports and external debt ====
In May 2015, the National Confederation of Commerce (CNC), in its newsletter Síntese da Conjuntura, prepared by economist and former Minister of Finance Ernane Galvêas, made a projection for GDP indicating a fall in national production of around 1.4%, mainly driven by the fall in industrial production (−4.0%), which had been going through a period of stagnation for three years. Even trade, which traditionally grows, lost steam in 2014 (−1.8%) and everything indicates that it will continue to fall in 2015 (−0.4%).

In the first two months of 2015, exports fell by 16.4% and imports by −15.7%. The negative current account balance rose to 100.2 billion dollars over the last 12 months. According to data from the International Monetary Fund (IMF), published by the newspaper O Globo, Brazil's external debt reached 750 billion dollars at the end of 2013; the equivalent of 1.8 trillion reais, or 33.45% of the Gross Domestic Product (GDP).

=== Education policy ===
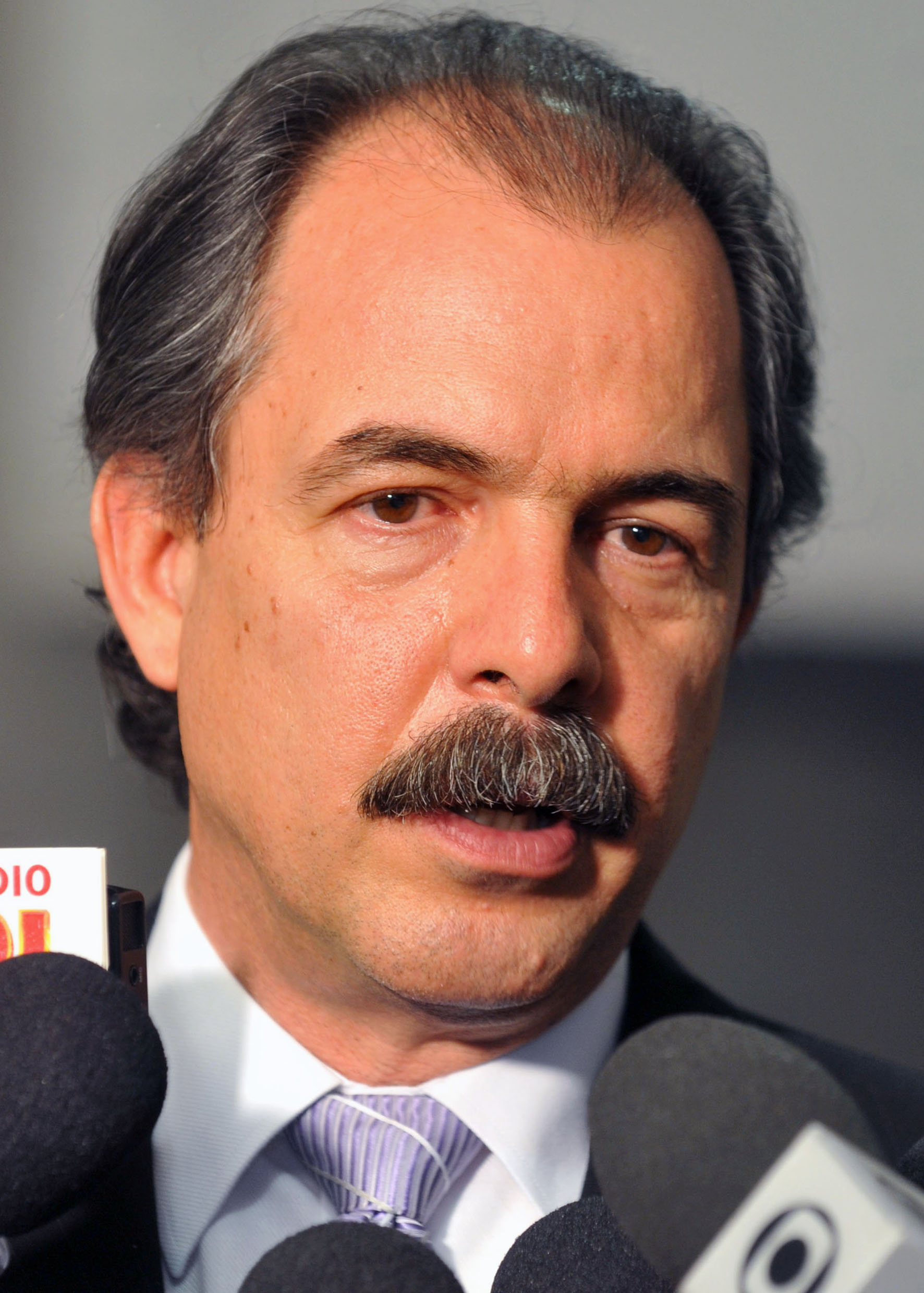
Aloízio Mercadante, Minister of Education during the Dilmagovernment

According to the 2010 Monitoring of Education for All report launched by UNESCO, Brazil has made "significant progress" in education, but inequalities persist between segments. The document also concluded that Brazil was far from meeting the targets for access to and quality of education set by the organization, ranking 88th out of 128 countries. In 2011, Brazil remained in the same position in the world education ranking, being considered "medium-developed" in the area, behind Argentina, Chile and even Ecuador and Bolivia.

In 2014, Brazil was ranked 38th out of a total of 40 countries and territories evaluated by the international education ranking of Pearson, a company that provides solutions for the area. It only surpassed Mexico and Indonesia. At the top of the ranking are South Korea, Japan, Singapore and Hong Kong (China). The Learning Curve 2014 study ranked educational performance based on factors related to changes in global educational performance and the importance of personal skills for the 21st century. Brazil rose one position in relation to the first ranking, released in 2012, but continued among those that registered a drop in the school performance and cognitive skills index.

Also in 2014, a UNESCO study of 150 countries revealed that Brazil ranked 8th among those with the highest number of adult illiterates. According to the most recent National Household Sample Survey (PNAD), carried out by the IBGE in 2012 and released in September 2013, the illiteracy rate among people aged 15 and over was estimated at 8.7%, which corresponds to 13.2 million illiterate people in the country.

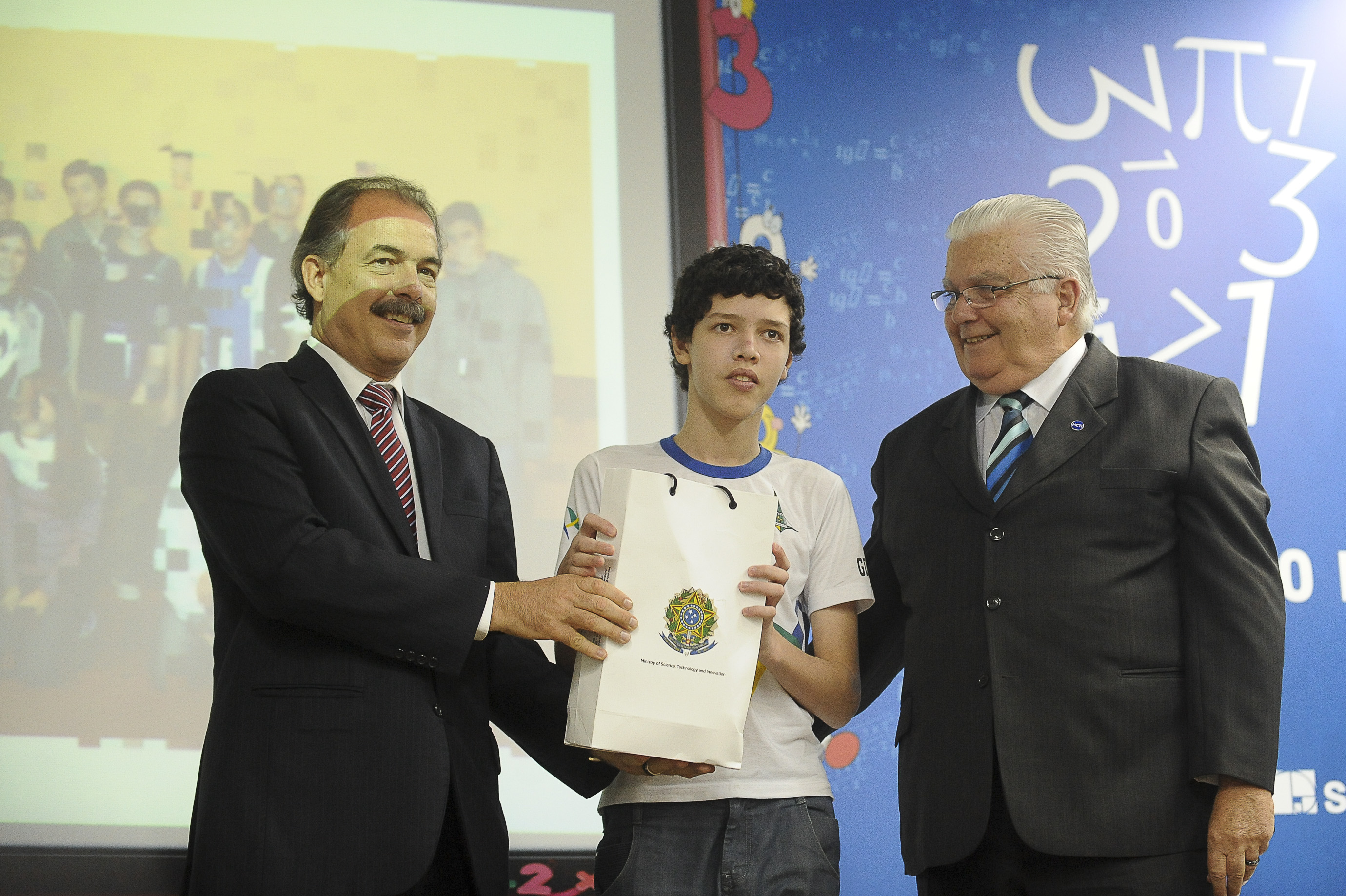
The ministers of Education and Science, Technology and Innovation, Aloizio Mercadante and Marco Antonio Raupp, present the award to student Hector Rocha, gold medalist in the 8th Brazilian Public School Math Olympics (OBMEP)

Only eighteen Brazilian universities are among the thousand best in the world (1.8% of the total) in a global ranking that highlights those with the greatest impact and scientific influence, according to a study carried out in 2014 by CWUR (Centre for World University Rankings), an Arab consultancy based in Jeddah. In 2012, when the rankings began, and in 2013, CWUR only surveyed the 100 best institutions; Brazil did not appear in either of these last two rankings. Of the ten best universities in the world, eight were from the USA. Only one Brazilian university was among the three hundred best in the world (0.33% of the total), and only four were among the five hundred best (0.8% of the total).

On 25 May, Dilma suspended the distribution of anti-homophobia kits in schools that the Ministry of Education had planned to distribute with the aim of combating bullying and discrimination against homosexuals. According to the General Secretariat of the Presidency, Gilberto Carvalho, "President Dilma did not like the videos, found the material inadequate, and determined that they should not be officially circulated". In 2015, the world education ranking released by the Organization for Economic Cooperation and Development (OECD) ranked Brazil 60th in the world for education, out of 76 countries surveyed, putting the country at a level close to that of African nations.

=== Pronatec ===
Back in 2011, the Federal Government created the Programa Nacional de Acesso ao Ensino Técnico e Emprego (Pronatec) to offer free professional qualification courses. With planned investments of R$24 billion by 2014, the programme aims to expand, internalize and democratize the offer of professional and technological education courses for Brazilian students.

=== Mais Educação ===
The Mais Educação Programme aimed to encourage full-time education, with priority given to the poorest regions. Aloizio Mercadante, Minister of Education from January 2012 to February 2014, said that the biggest problems are in secondary education, but "in the last 15 years we have brought in around 5 million more students. Inclusion is fantastic. [...] The country has become aware that education is something strategic".

=== Vale Cultura ===
According to the Ministry of Culture, Vale Cultura had the potential to reach 42 million workers; by the beginning of April 2014, 500,000 had been covered. The programme paid 50 reais a month to duly registered company employees whose rights were governed by the Consolidation of Labour Laws (CLT) and who earned up to five minimum wages. The money could be used, for example, to go to concerts and museums and to buy CDs, books and magazines.

=== Sports ===
==== World Cup 2014 ====
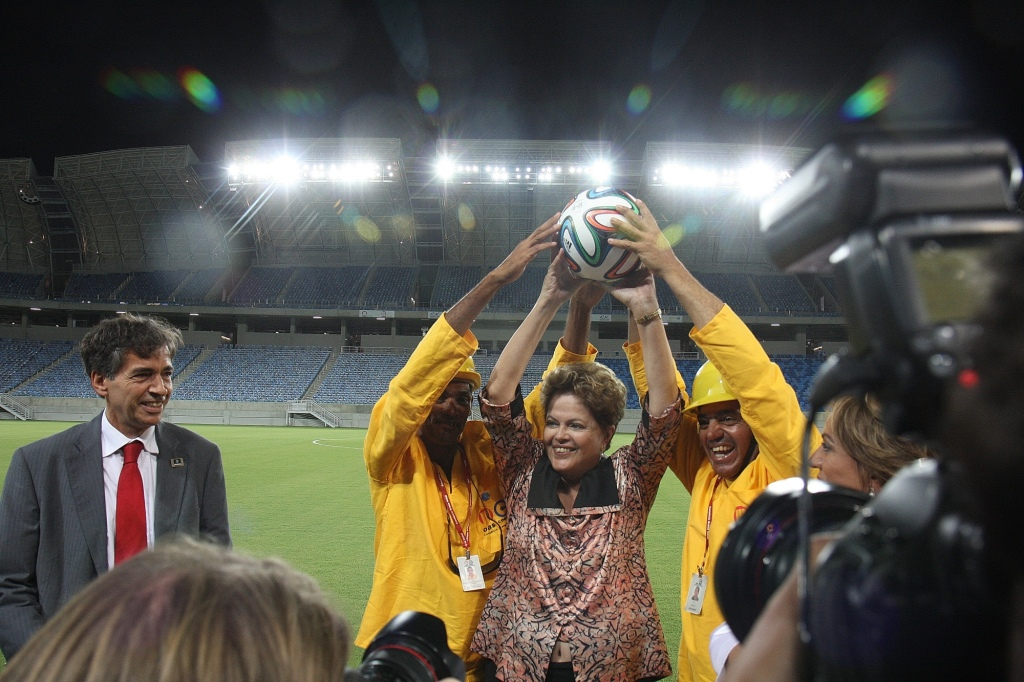
Dilma inaugurates the Arena das Dunas in Natal in January 2014, as part of the country's preparations for the 2014 FIFA World Cup.

Before the 2014 World Cup, there were several demonstrations in the streets against the event and numerous criticisms of the event being held in Brazil. However, the competition was a success, even though there were several protests during the cup. Previously, polls showed that less than half of those interviewed supported the tournament, but on the eve of the semi-finals of the cup, the situation was reversed, with the majority of those surveyed approving of the event.

A Datafolha survey revealed that 83% of foreigners who came to Brazil rated the organization of the World Cup as good or excellent. Opinions on urban mobility and the country's communication system were divided. For the majority (60%), Brazil's public security (reinforced during the event) was better than expected, and for 34%, it was within what they expected. The organization of the World Cup was better than expected for 51%, and within expectations for 39% of those interviewed. Urban mobility was better than expected for 46% and within expectations for 40%. The communication system (including telephony and internet access) was the item surveyed with the most divided evaluations. For 24%, the communication system exceeded expectations, for 24% it was worse than expected, and for 31% it was within expectations.

Before the World Cup, Brazilian magazines, such as the weekly Veja, suggested back in 2011 that the works for the tournament would not be completed until 2038. A few days before the event, the controversial filmmaker, journalist and columnist for various media outlets, Arnaldo Jabor, said that the competition would reveal Brazil's "incompetence" to the world. A month before the tournament, the renowned German magazine Der Spiegel reported that the World Cup could be a disaster because of protests, violence in the streets, problems with public transport, airports and stadiums. However, the number of demonstrations was lower than expected, as were isolated cases of tourists and fans being inconvenienced throughout Brazil.

After the start of the World Cup, media reports began to praise the competition and international journalists suggested that the 2014 World Cup was the greatest they had ever seen, both for the soccer played on the pitch and for the cordiality and festive, peaceful atmosphere observed in Brazil.

According to a survey carried out by the Ministry of Tourism with over 6,600 tourists, the 2014 World Cup attracted more than one million foreign tourists from 203 different nationalities to Brazil, 61% of whom had never been to the country before. 92.3% said they had come to the country because of the event and 95% said they intended to return. The average length of stay of international tourists in Brazil was 13 days, visiting 378 cities across the country. The number of Brazilian citizens who travelled around the country during the World Cup was more than 3 million, with the state of São Paulo being the main source of domestic tourists (858,825), followed by Rio de Janeiro (260,527) and Minas Gerais (220,021). A research study conducted by the Economic Research Institute Foundation (FIPE) estimated that hosting the 2014 World Cup injected around 30 billion reais into the Brazilian economy, or 0.7% of the country's gross domestic product (GDP) in 2013.

=== Minorities ===
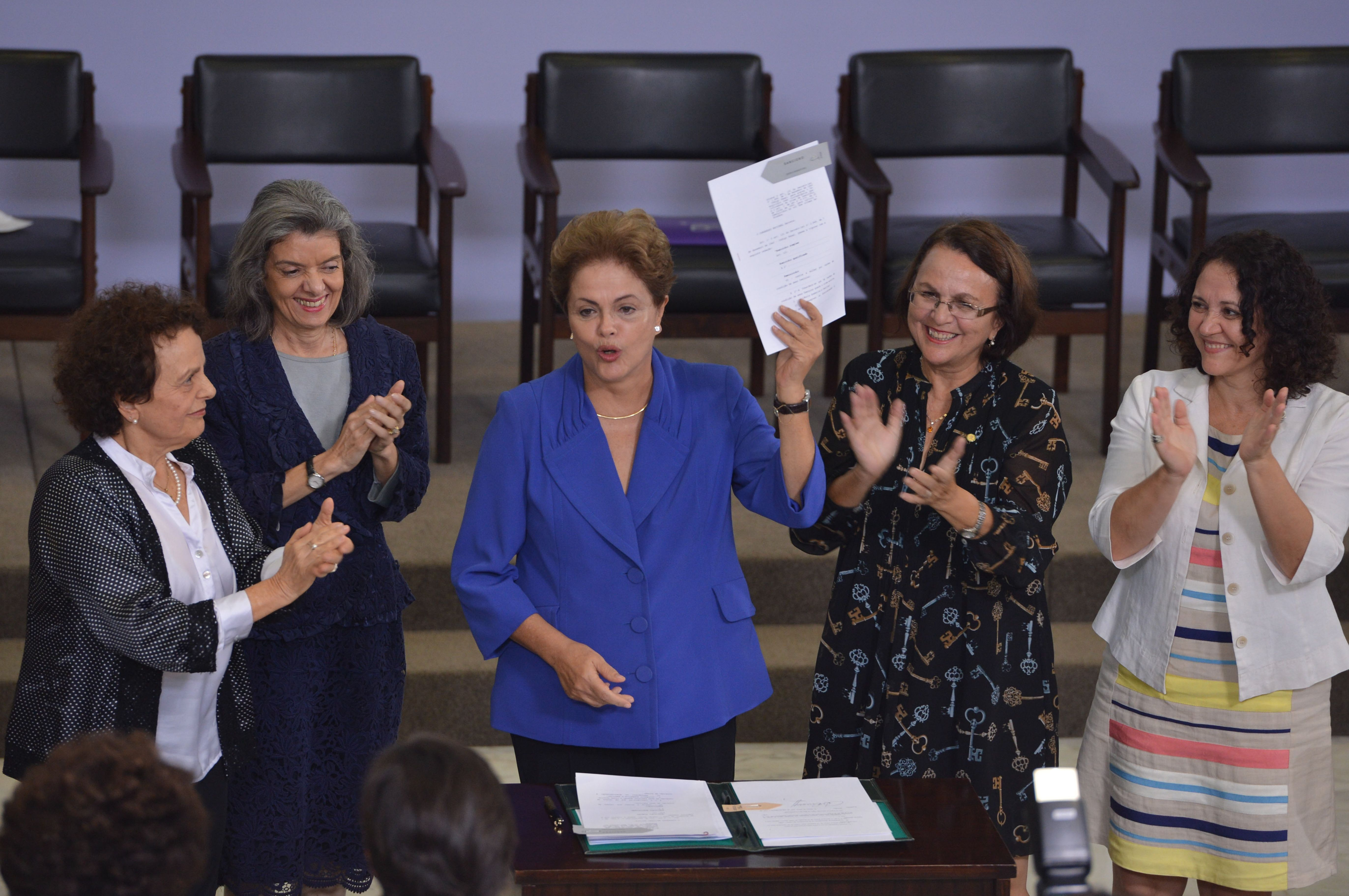
Dilma approving the Feminicide Law, 9 March 2015

On 9 March 2015, Law No. 13,104 included the qualifier of feminicide in the Brazilian Penal Code, which occurs when committed "against a woman for reasons of her condition as a female". It defines feminicide as being committed for reasons of the female sex when the crime involves: domestic and family violence or contempt for or discrimination against women.

=== Human development and health ===
In the 2010 survey, the last year of the Lula government, Brazil was in 73rd place out of 169 countries in the HDI (Human Development Index) ranking. In the first two years of the Dilma administration, the country fell seven places in the ranking, coming 80th in 2012 and rising one place in 2013. However, 79th place still reflected an index below the Latin American average for education and life expectancy. The average schooling in Latin America was 7.9 years; in Brazil, 7.2 years. The figure has remained the same since 2010. Brazilian life expectancy was 73.9 years in 2013, below the Latin American average of 74.9 years. The United Nations study calculates countries' Human Development Index based on education, health and income indicators.

In July 2013, the Dilma government launched the Mais Médicos Programme, created to fill the lack of doctors in municipalities in the interior and on the outskirts of Brazil's big cities. The format of "importing" doctors from other countries was harshly criticized by associations representing the category, civil society, health students and even the Public Prosecutor's Office. Regarding the Mais Médicos Programme, Irene Abramovich, president of the Association of Doctors at the Hospital das Clínicas in São Paulo, said: "There's no shortage of doctors, there's a shortage of hospitals and infrastructure". Márcia Rosa, president of the Regional Council of Medicine of the State of Rio de Janeiro, said: "The changes [proposed by the government] put the health of the population at risk, especially those who use the SUS".

Despite criticism from medical associations, the programme was supported by the majority of the population. According to a survey by the MDA institute, commissioned by the National Transport Confederation and carried out in September, 73.9% of the population was in favour of foreign doctors coming to the country. Based on a study by the Institute of Science, Technology and Quality (ICTQ), 61% of Porto Alegre residents support the programme, while the average for all 16 capitals surveyed was 33%. Another survey, by the Methodus Institute, indicated that 59.3% of the people of Rio Grande do Sul approved of Mais Médicos.

In August 2013, a survey published by the Bloomberg News agency placed Brazil in last place among the world's health systems. The research only considered nations with populations of more than 5 million, a GDP per capita of more than U$5,000 and a life expectancy of more than 70 years. 48 countries were ranked on the criteria of life expectancy and the per capita cost of health treatment. Brazil came last on the list behind countries such as Romania, Peru and the Dominican Republic. The report was based on official data from the World Bank, IMF (International Monetary Fund) and WHO (World Health Organization).

== Foreign policy ==
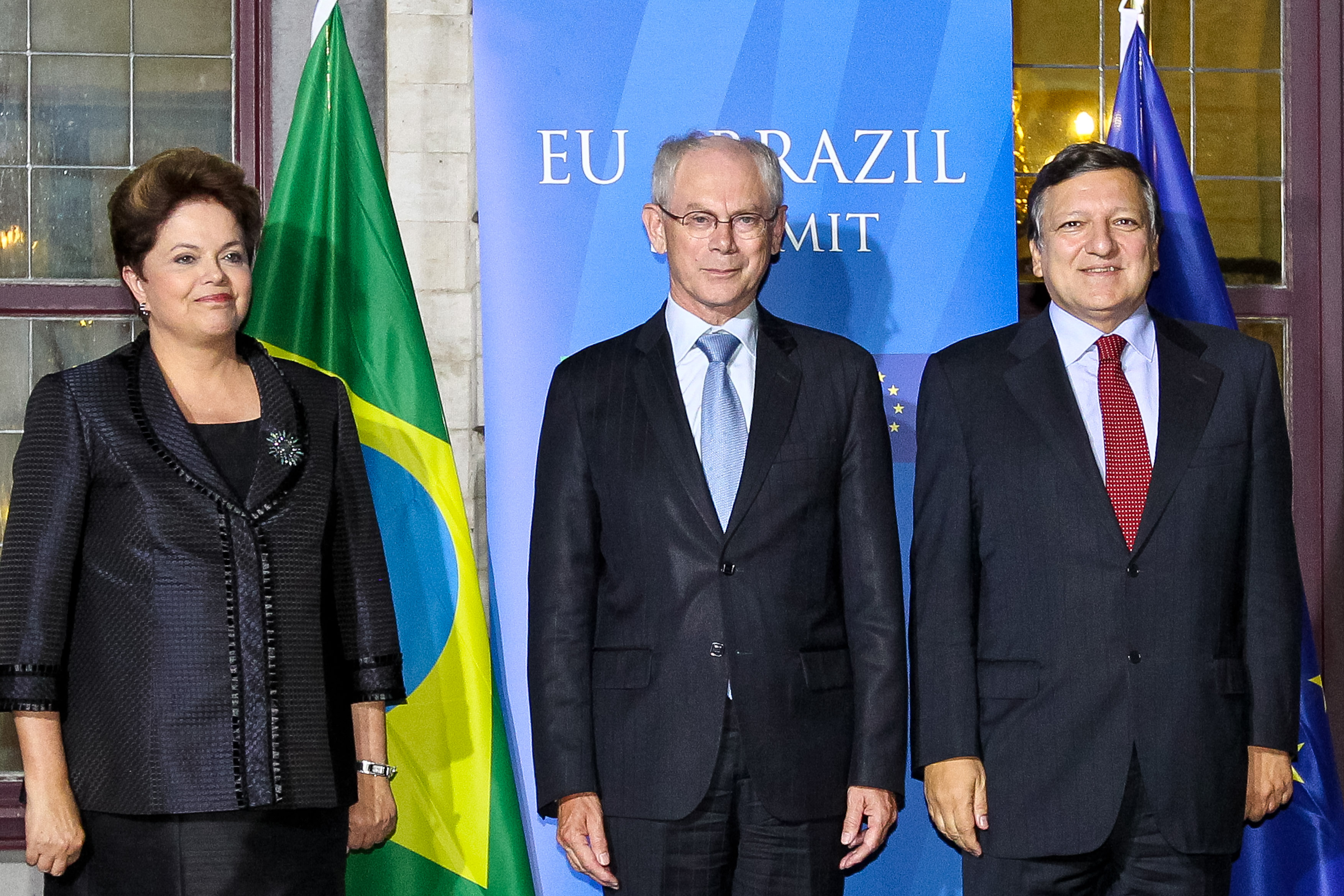
Dilma meets with President of the European Council Herman Van Rompuy and President of the European Commission José Manuel Barroso with in the EU–Brazil Summit in Brussels, 3 October 2011

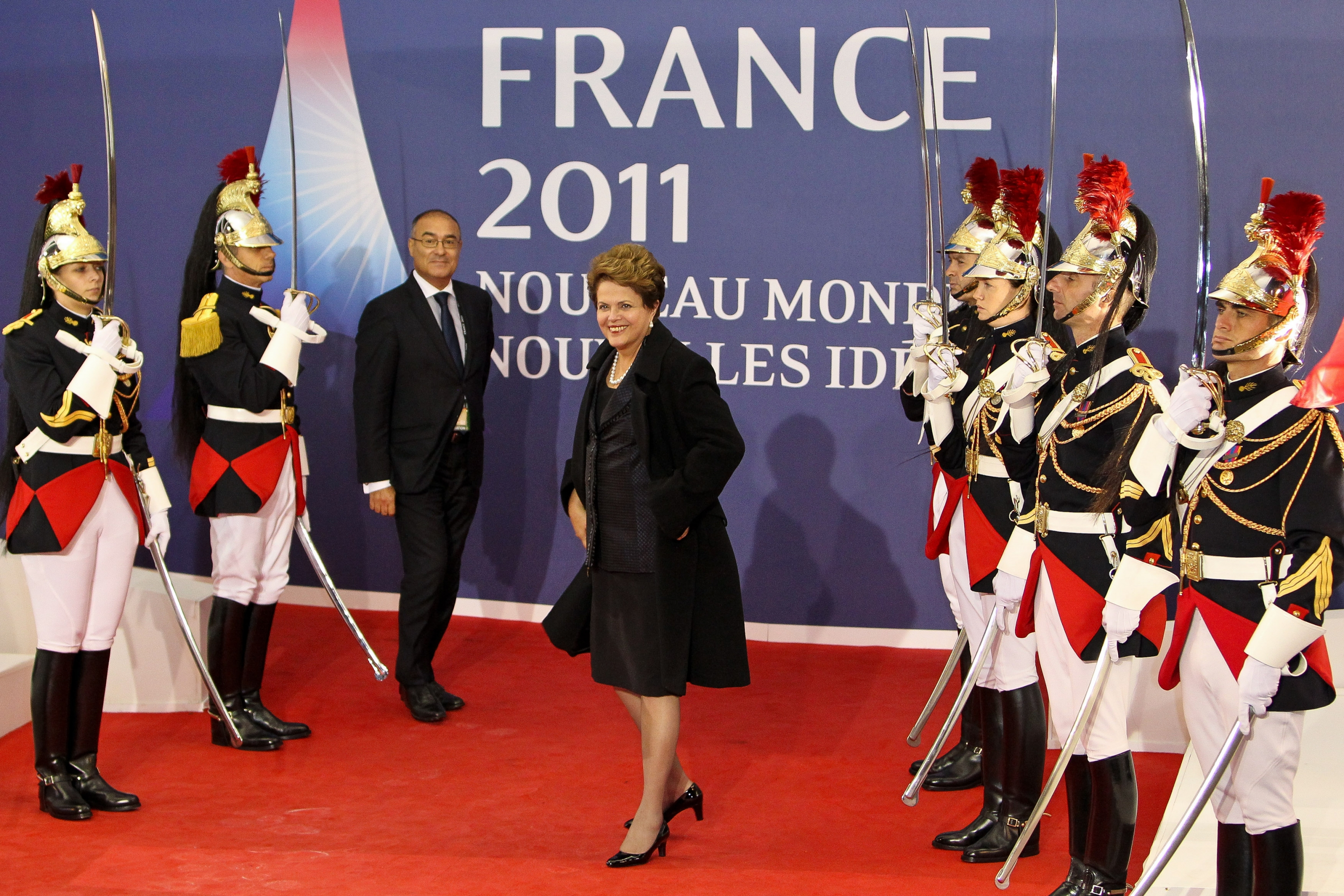
Rousseff arrives in Cannes for the 6th G20 Summit, November 2011

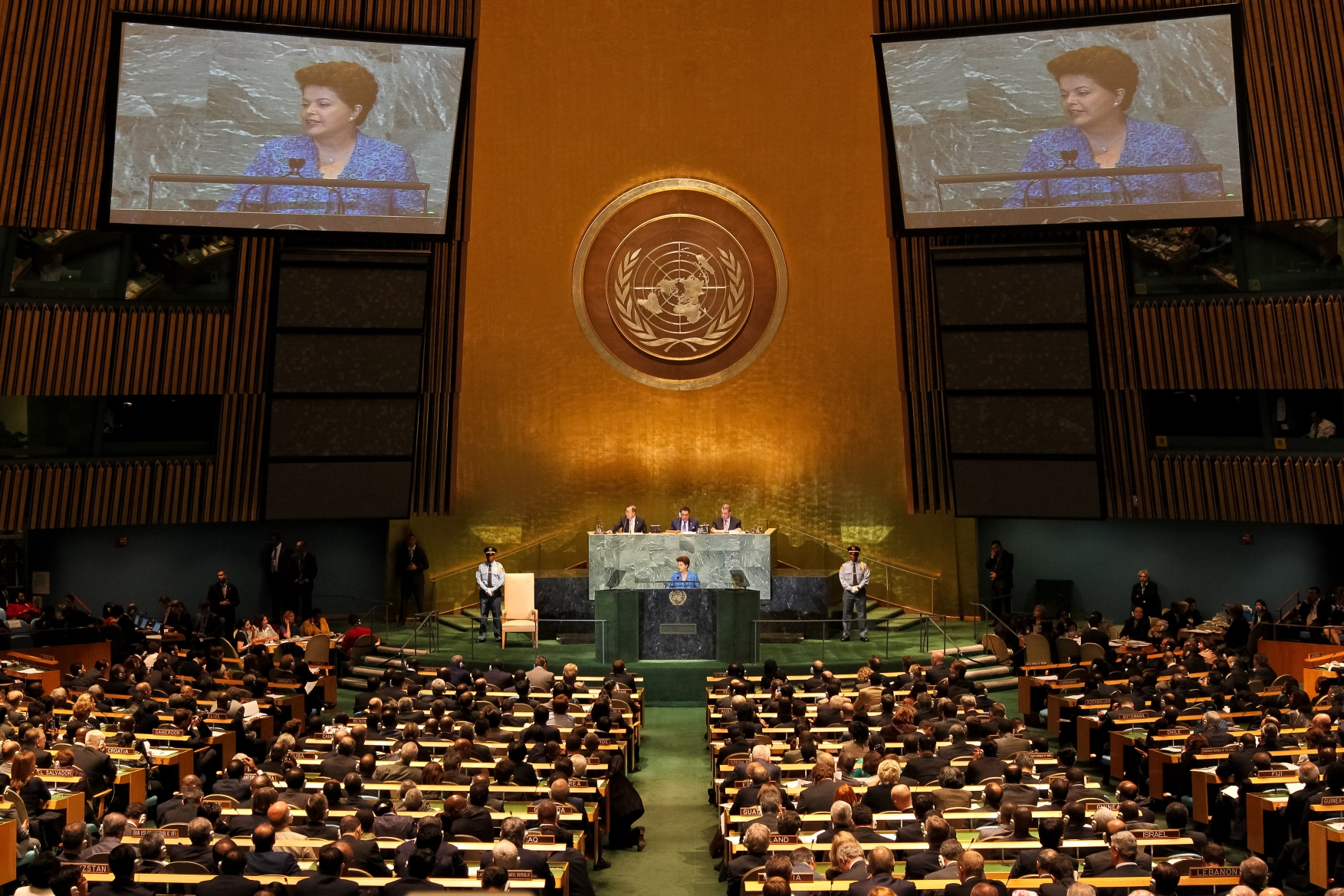
Dilma delivering the opening speech at the 66th session of United Nations General Assembly on 21 September 2011, marking the first time a woman opened a United Nations session.

The Dilma administration began its foreign policy management with changes in position compared to the previous government. One of these was related to Iran's human rights issues, since in the previous term the country's representative at the UN abstained from voting in favour of sanctions. Dilma clarified that she would be willing to change Brazil's voting pattern on resolutions dealing with human rights violations in the Middle Eastern country.

In her first year, she moved closer to Argentina, seeking greater trade integration and encouraging productive integration by transferring production units of large Brazilian companies to the neighboring country.

=== International recognition ===
In 2009, she was included among the 100 most influential Brazilians of the year by Época magazine and, in November of the following year, Forbes ranked her as the 16th most powerful person in the world. In 2011, she was included in Time magazine's list of the 100 most influential people in the world, as the third most powerful woman in the world and the 22nd most powerful person in the world according to Forbes.

On 20 September 2011, Dilma received the Woodrow Wilson Public Service Award at the Pierre Hotel in New York City, United States, a distinction that was also given to her predecessor in 2009. The following day, she became the first woman to open a session of the United Nations General Assembly. Dilma was also featured on the cover of Newsweek magazine on 26 September 2011. During her state visit to Bulgaria on 5 October 2011, she was awarded the Bulgarian government's highest honour, the Order of Stara Planina. At the end of 2013, the Spanish newspaper El País classified her as one of the 11 Ibero-American personalities "who left their mark on the year".

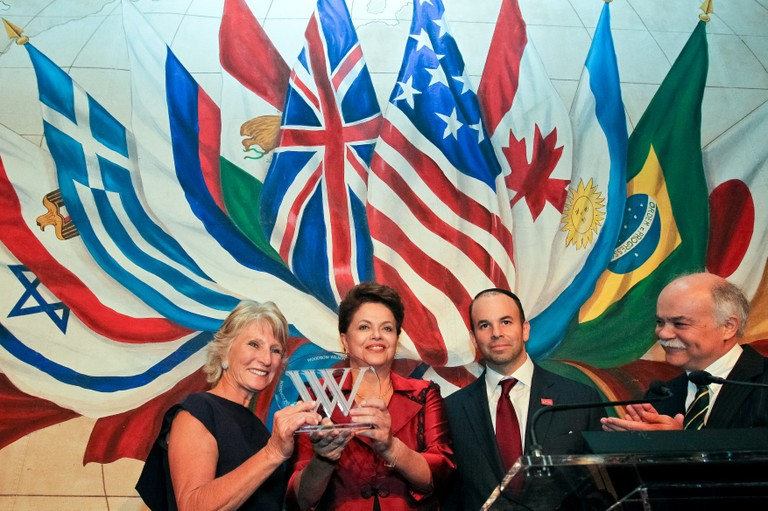
Rousseff receiving the Woodrow Wilson Awards in New York on 21 September 2011

Journalist Glenn Greenwald, who helped Edward Snowden disclose the US National Security Agency's (NSA) spying around the world, said that the Brazilian government had more courage than most other countries in criticizing the US government's position. Greenwald said: "Here [in Brazil] politicians and President Dilma Rousseff reacted much more vehemently and aggressively [to the spying cases]. Rousseff disapproved of the US behaviour, turning down the invitation for the first state visit to the US in several decades. She criticized US behaviour at the United Nations, while President Obama waited outside the plenary hall in the corridor. In my opinion, none of the European heads of state and government have shown such courage".

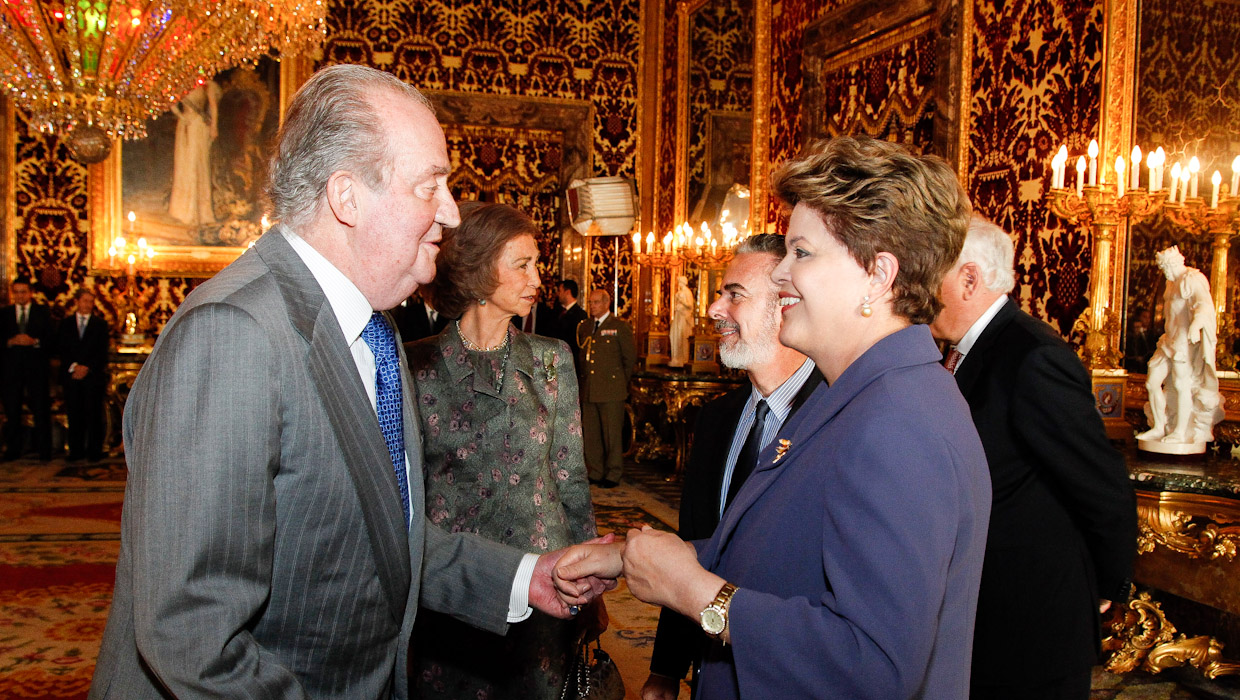
Dilma during a meeting with Their Majesties King Juan Carlos I and Queen Sofia of Spain at the Royal Palace

In her memoir Hard Choices, Hillary Clinton, the former US Secretary of State, said that she "admires and likes" Dilma and called her a "formidable leader". "She may not have the graceful boldness of Lula or the technical experience of Cardoso, but she has a strong intellect and a lot of drive", she said. Clinton also points to the president's actions during the 2013 social protests as an example of democratic action: "Instead of despising or beating up and arresting protesters, as many other countries did, including Venezuela, Rousseff joined them, acknowledged their concerns and asked them to work with the government to solve the problems".

== Approval ratings ==
In its first three months in power, the Dilma government received approval from 47% of the Brazilian population as "excellent" or "good", according to a survey released by the Datafolha institute in March 2011, which also registered 7% of people considering the Dilma administration as "bad" or "terrible" and another 34% as "regular". The positive result technically equaled (according to the margin of error of 2 percentage points) the record for the beginning of a government, 48%, obtained by Luiz Inácio Lula da Silva's administration in the first three months of 2007, referring to the former president's second term. It also surpassed in popularity all of Lula's predecessors, when considering this initial phase of the mandate, according to the historical series started by Datafolha in 1990. In the survey, the population interviewed said that the areas in which the Dilma government performed best in the first three months were education and the fight against hunger and poverty. As for the worst-performing areas, respondents cited health and the aspects linked to violence and security.

In April 2012, the Dilma government achieved 64% approval from the country's population as "excellent" or "good", according to a survey released by Datafolha, which also registered 5% of people considering the Dilma administration as "bad" or "terrible" and another 29% as "regular". Approval of Rousseff's administration was a record in two respects: the highest rate achieved by Dilma since her inauguration and the highest approval of a president, considering the period investigated – one year and three months in office.

After the Petrobras scandal surfaced, and with the worsening of the Brazilian economy, Dilma's popularity plummeted and reached the worst mark in the history of her government: from 42% in December 2014, it fell to 23% in February 2015, according to the Datafolha polling institute; the bad rating rose from 24% to 44% in the same period. At the time of the June 2013 protests, Rousseff's popularity was at 30%, the worst rating for a president since December 1999. According to the newspaper Folha de S.Paulo, "the country is witnessing the most rapid and profound political deterioration since the Fernando Collor de Mello government". Datafolha also gave Dilma the first "red rating" of her administration, an average of 4.8. For 47% of those interviewed, the president was dishonest. Another 54% said she was untruthful and 50% were undecided. For 60% of voters, Dilma lied in the 2014 election campaign.

On 18 March 2015, Datafolha released a new poll showing that the government's approval rating had fallen to 13%, the worst since the beginning of her first term in office in January 2011. Around 62% of those interviewed rated the PT government as bad or terrible. According to the institute, this was the highest disapproval rating for a president since September 1992, the day before the impeachment of then-president Fernando Collor de Mello, who at the time had a 68% disapproval rating. In April 2015, a new Ibope poll showed another drop in the index, with 12% considering the Dilma government "good or excellent", and 64% considering it "bad or terrible". In September 2015, another Ibope poll showed a further drop, with 10% considering the Dilma government "good or excellent" and 69% considering it "bad or terrible".

At the beginning of February 2016, a poll by the Ipsos institute revealed that the Dilma government's approval rating was 5%, while 79% considered it bad or terrible. According to Cliff Young, president of Ipsos Public Affairs in the US, Dilma was one of the most unpopular international leaders: "In the last year of the Bush administration, for example, his approval rating was 20%. In Venezuela, President Maduro had about 15% approval".

=== Popular demonstrations ===
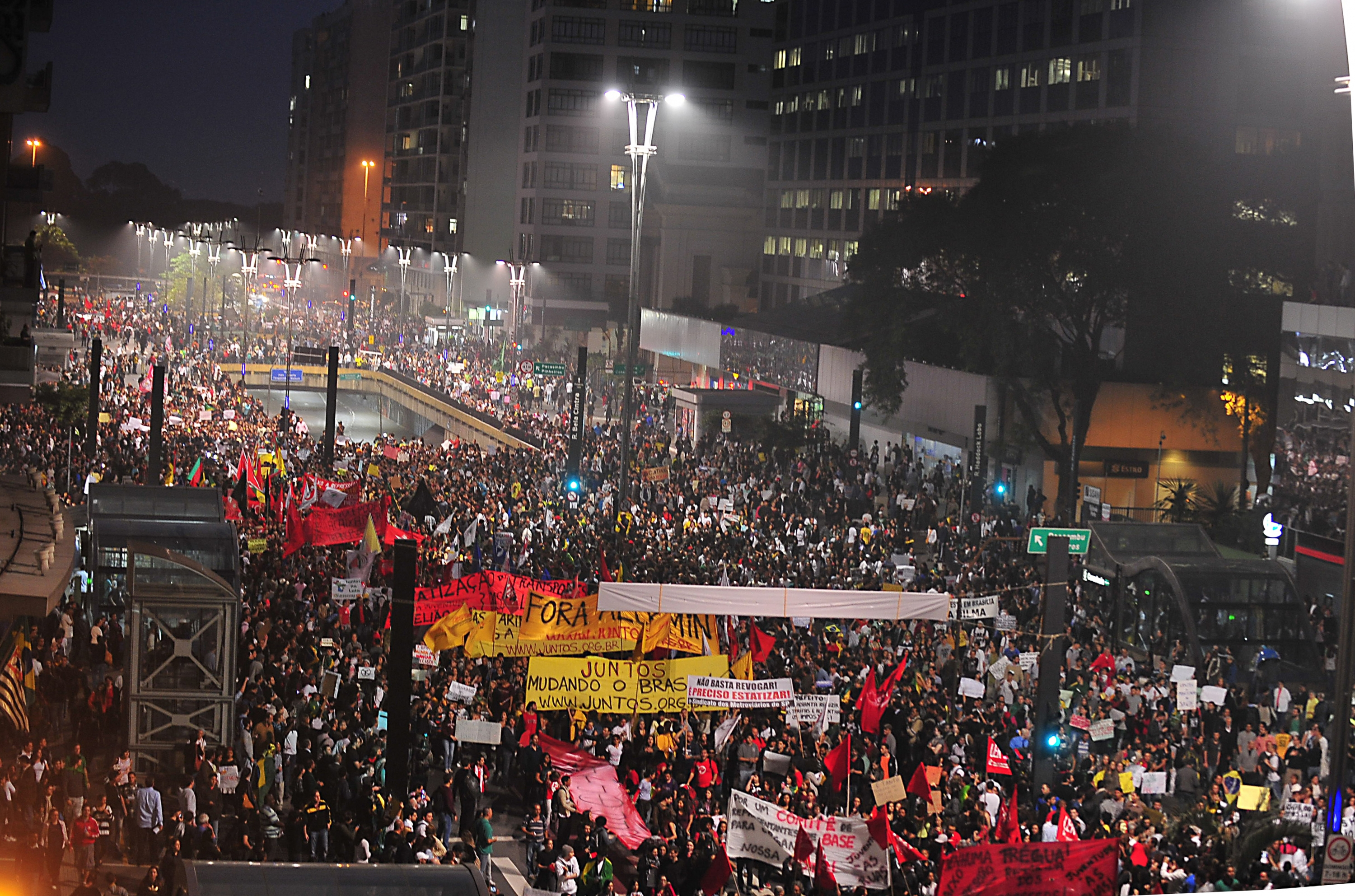
Protests on Paulista Avenue in São Paulo, 20 June 2013

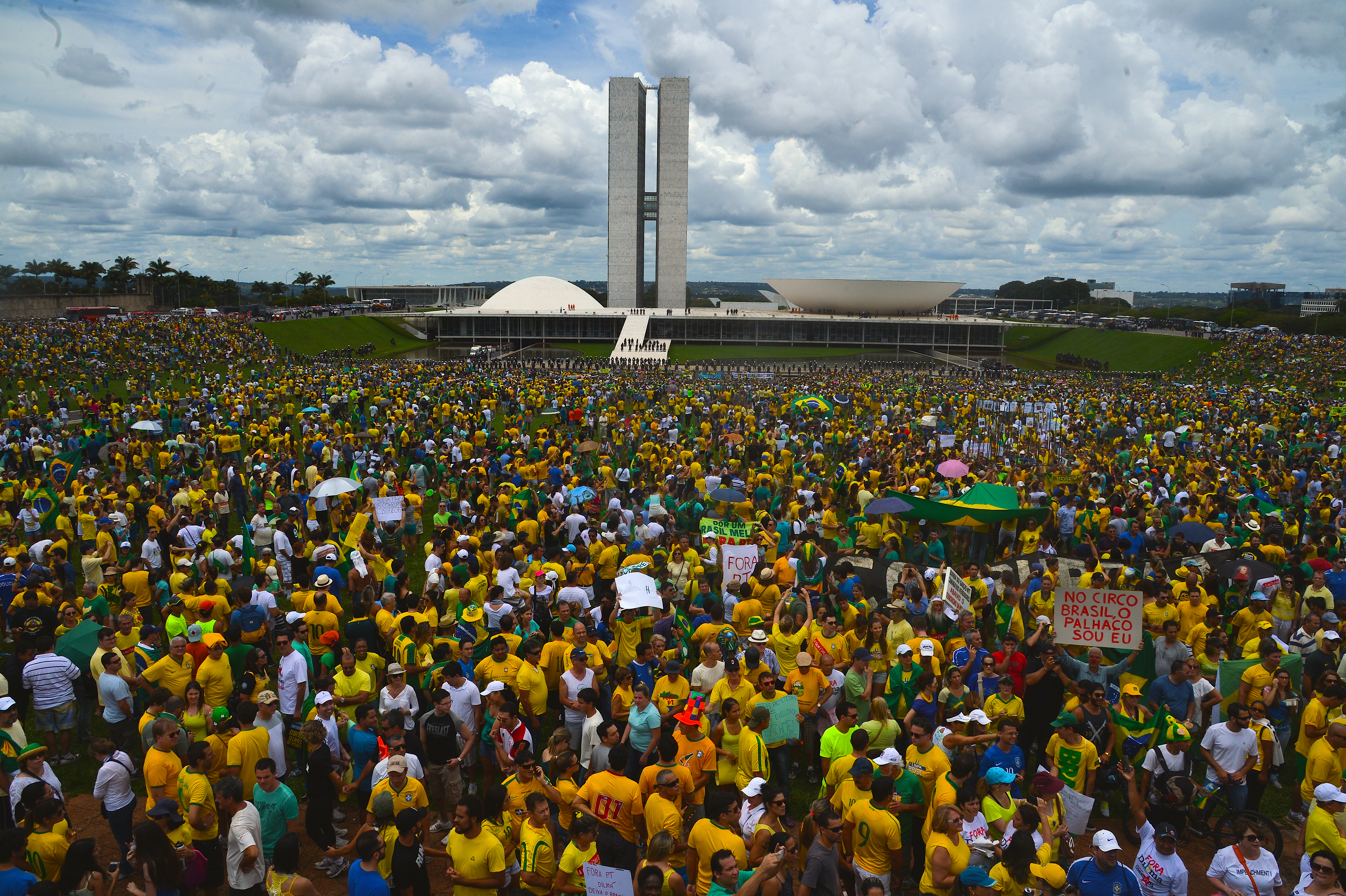
Protests against the Dilma government in March 2015 in Brasília

Since June 2013, in the midst of the historic wave of public protests that spread across the country, dissatisfaction with the Executive and Legislative branches of government, combined with issues such as health, education, security and the return of inflation, the popularity of the President of the Republic, governors, mayors, members of parliament and the majority of the country's parties has declined sharply.

On 21 June 2013, the day after the largest demonstration recorded at the time, Dilma canceled a trip to Japan and called an emergency meeting with some ministers, as well as the vice-president, and the president of the Chamber of Deputies. On the same day, a presidential statement was recorded and broadcast the same evening. In this speech, she announced the creation of five pacts and a proposal for a plebiscite. The movement brought together millions of people on 15 March, 12 April, 16 August and 13 December 2015 and, according to some estimates, was the largest popular mobilization in the country since the beginning of the New Republic.

In June 2013, after the series of social demonstrations and movements, Dilma's popularity, along with that of other Brazilian leaders, fell considerably. The positive evaluation of the president's government fell 27 points in three weeks, to 30% in the "excellent" or "good" category. It was the biggest drop in a president's approval rating between one poll and the next since then-president Fernando Collor de Mello's economic plan in 1990, when Brazilians' savings were confiscated. Between March and June 2014, the Dilma government's popularity fell from 36% to 31%. In a poll carried out jointly by CNI and IBOPE and released on 19 June 2014, 33% of those interviewed considered the government to be bad or terrible.

In March 2015, new protests against the Dilma government took place in various regions of Brazil, with the main aims of protesting against the government and defending the Car Wash Operation.

== Controversies ==
=== Environmental policy ===
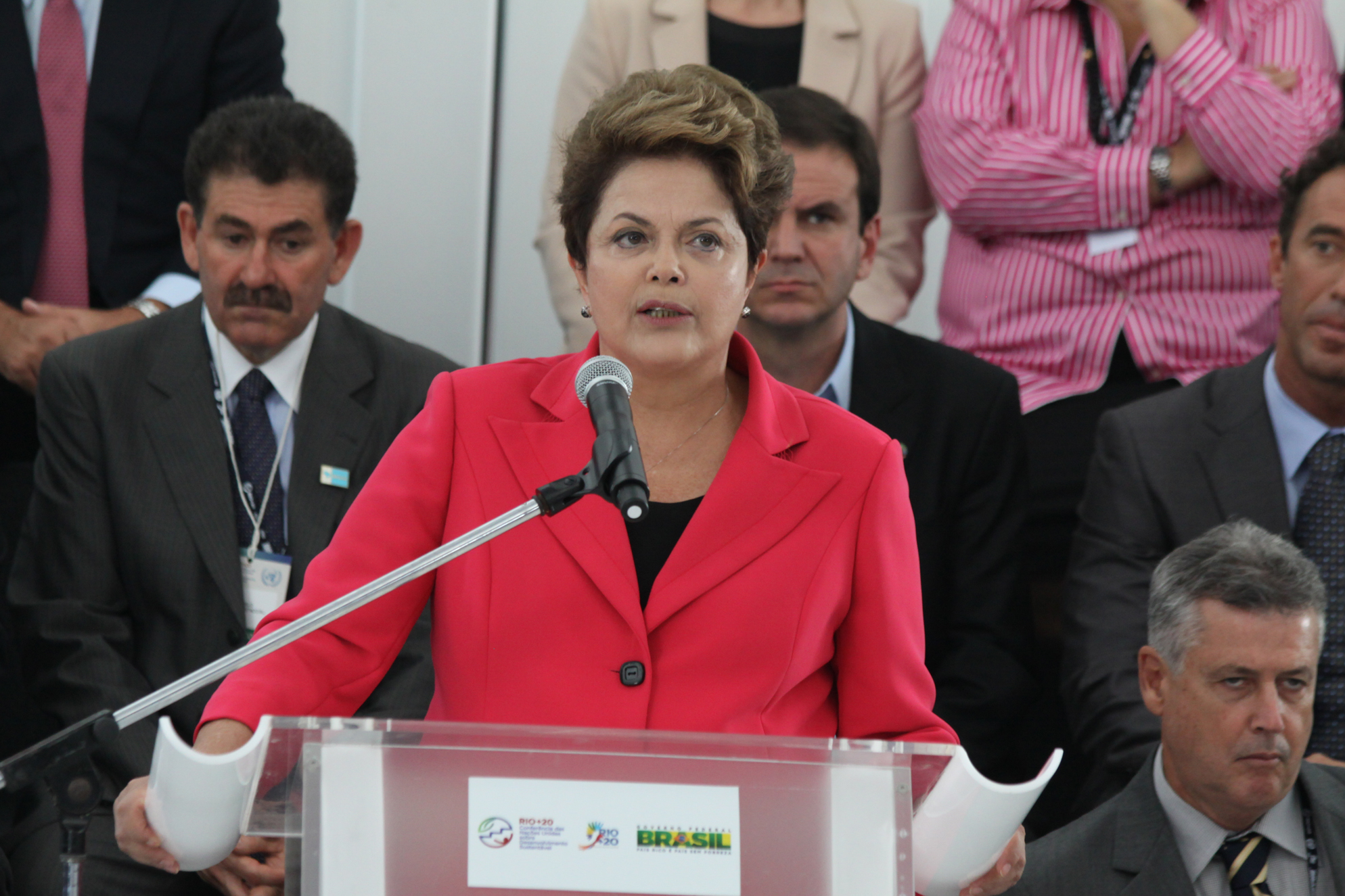
Inauguration of the Brazil Pavilion at Rio+20, the United Nations Conference on Sustainable Development, with Dilma

Indigenous problems are closely linked to the government's controversial environmental policy. The conflict escalated when the new Brazilian Forest Code was approved, which environmentalists consider to be a major step backwards. An opinion poll carried out by Datafolha revealed that 79% of the population was against the amnesty for deforesters contained in the new text, but it was approved in Congress by the strength of the Parliamentary Agricultural Front. The presidential vetoes were considered timid and insufficient to reverse the damage. In 2013, the rate of deforestation in Brazil increased dramatically, reversing the negative trend of previous years, which made Brazil considered, despite its many problems, a model in forest management. According to Imazon, deforestation in the Legal Amazon in June 2013 represented an increase of 437% over the same period last year. Meanwhile, degraded areas expanded by more than 1,000%. The government was accused of making the whole environmental issue a simple political move, meeting some needs but favouring abusive, if not criminal, economic interests that cause uncompensated damage, and was considered by many environmentalists to be the worst government in recent decades in its approach to socio-environmental problems.

=== Indigenous and agrarian issues ===
Brazil's indigenous peoples accused the government of ignoring their urgent demands, giving priority to agribusiness, contractors and other productive sectors, which exploit their lands without their prior free and informed consent, without giving them the necessary compensation, bypassing rights guaranteed by the Constitution, subjecting them to countless forms of violence and abuse, sparking conflicts that end in death and suffering, and leaving them in a situation that was comparable to that which the peoples suffered at the hands of the European colonizers. The regional public prosecutor in São Paulo, Maria Luiza Grabner, said that:

[...] the government hasn't complied with the ILO convention [...] Often, what we see is a mockery of consultation or hearings, when the political process has already taken place and decision-making has already taken place [...] This is one of the biggest complaints from indigenous peoples. Developments are taking place, bills are being passed, without any real consultation.

The Indigenous Missionary Council (CIMI), one of the main organizations working to defend the natives, filed a complaint with the UN asking it to intervene with the government. According to CIMI, in 2012 the rate of violence against indigenous people rose by 237% compared to the previous year, in crimes generally associated with land issues. One of the most notorious conflicts involved the construction of the controversial Belo Monte Dam. Human rights violations were reported to the OAS, but the government refused to appear for questioning. The demand for land to live and produce was shared with the "landless", organized in the Landless Movement (MST), who accuse the government of neglecting this population and cause numerous violent conflicts. The government's failure was pointed out in a letter delivered to the president by the MST on 13 February 2014:

The government was unable to solve this serious social and political problem. The average number of families settled through expropriations was only 13,000 a year, the lowest average since the military dictatorship. All the encamped families must be settled immediately.

=== Press relations ===
In 2015, Dilma achieved the biggest drop in spending on federal advertising in the historical series that began in 2000. The R$1.864 billion spent by the direct and indirect administrations in 2015 represented a drop of 24.1% in relation to the R$2.456 billion spent in 2014. The detailed amounts, by media source, were obtained by Universo Online, through the Access to Information Law, and are adjusted by the IGP-M:

Means	Media	2014 (R$)	2015 (R$)	Variation
Television	TV Globo	602 848 967	396 501 178	34.2%▼
Television	Rede Record	281 146 832	242 987 384	13.6%▼
Television	SBT	172 760 771	115 454 314	33.2%▼
Television	Bandeirantes	127 621 569	86 095 249	32.5%▼
Television	RedeTV!	40 296 180	34 377 419	14.7%▼
Printed newspaper	Folha de S.Paulo	15 556 953	13 639 194	12.3%▼
Printed newspaper	O Globo	22 945 366	12 870 354	43.9%▼
Printed newspaper	O Estado de S. Paulo	18 034 766	10 881 935	39.7%▼
Printed newspaper	Valor Econômico	10 193 039	9 061 223	11.1%▼
Digital newspaper	Folha de S.Paulo	2 330 952	5 514 572	136.6%▲
	O Globo	2 609 032	3 796 621	45.5%▲
	O Estado de S. Paulo	2 923 409	3 427 994	17.2%▲
	Valor Econômico	307 882	1 100 427	257.4%▲
Magazine	Veja	21 205 689	4 622 310	78.2%▼
	Época	9 647 781	3 076 610	68.1%▼
	Istoé	7 649 274	4 854 383	36.5%▼
	CartaCapital	3 347 865	1 631 611	51.3%▼
Web portal	Universo Online (except Folha de S.Paulo)	15 644 390	15 252 549	2.5%▼
Web portal	Globo.com (including G1)	14 398 722	13 959 535	3.1%▼
Web portal	Yahoo! (including partners)	9 119 781	7 752 669	15%▼
Web portal	R7 (including partners)	6 745 898	5 678 167	15.8%▼
Web portal	Terra (including partners)	9 958 764	5 353 044	46.2%▼
Web portal	iG (including partners)	8 063 288	6 253 448	22.4%▼
Web portal	MSN (including Bing, Skype, Outlook and Xbox)	14 071 543	17 041 449	21.1%▲

=== Accusations of corruption ===
Criticism of the Dilma government's connivance in cases of corruption at high institutional levels has multiplied, even though the government claimed that fighting corruption was a priority. By criticizing the Federal Court of Accounts, which has accused seven PAC projects of overbilling, the president could, in the opinion of Jorge Oliveira, writing for Diário do Poder encourage the institutionalization of corruption. He says:

By trying to turn the public against the TCU, criticizing the court for condemning her government's overpriced works, Dilma runs the risk of institutionalizing corruption in Brazil. [...] She wants to speed up the PAC projects, which have been paralyzed everywhere, by any means possible. She wants to win by protesting what she hasn't managed to do in the last three years: manage the country competently. With one year to go until the elections, Dilma is touring the states announcing huge projects and inaugurating works by city councilors. She promises billions and billions of reais for projects that simply won't come off the drawing board, but which are reported in the press as feasible less than a year before the end of her government.

Senator Pedro Simon, referring to several recent scandals involving the misappropriation of millions in public funds that have not been resolved, said:

It's the impunity that prevails in this Republic. Nobody goes to jail and the money isn't returned.

At the end of 2013, Brazil was in 72nd place (out of 177 countries) in Transparency International's perception of corruption. Denmark appeared as the least corrupt, with 91 points, and Somalia as the most corrupt, with 8 points; Brazil scored 42 points in the survey. Mexican researcher Alexandro Salas explained "There is a feeling of very extensive corruption", director for the Americas at Transparency International, who called on Brazil to start applying its "great infrastructure" against corruption.

=== Accusations against ministers ===
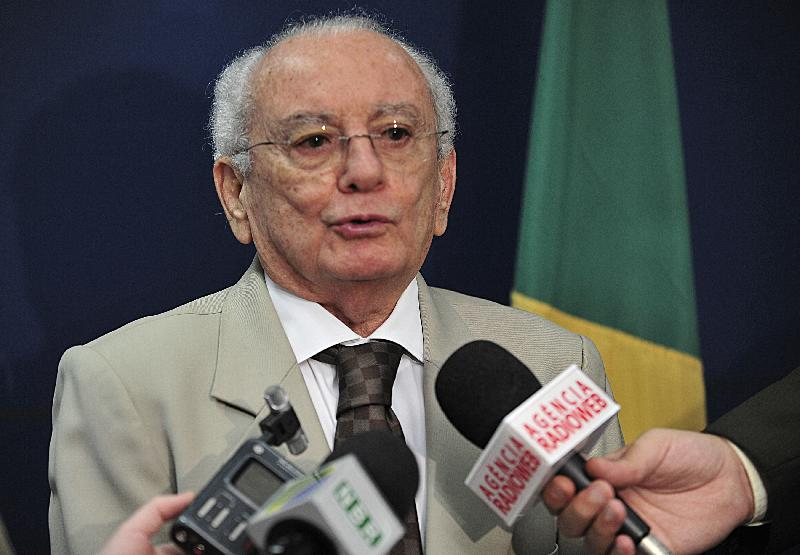
The former Minister of Tourism, Pedro Novais.

According to the newspaper O Estado de S. Paulo, on 22 December 2010, Pedro Novais, recently appointed to the Ministry of Tourism, was the first member of the government to be accused, even before he took office. He was accused of using public money to pay for a Motel Caribe in São Luís, to the value of R$2,156.00 from his indemnity allowance in June of the same year. Despite the accusations, Novais was kept in office and a few days later returned the money spent to the public coffers. However, during 2011, he was denounced by the press for serious irregularities when he was a federal deputy for Maranhão. With no political or government support, he was dismissed by the president on 14 September of the same year and replaced by Gastão Vieira.

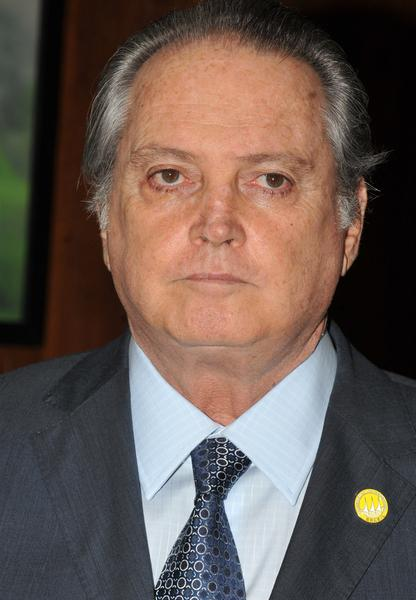
Minister of Agriculture, Wagner Rossi

On 15 May 2011, an article also published in Folha de S.Paulo, stated that the Chief of Staff of the Presidency, Antonio Palocci (PT), multiplied his assets by 20 in four years. Between 2006 and 2010, he went from 375,000 to 7.5 million reais. Palocci said he had declared his assets to the IRS and denied any irregularities. The case had repercussions and the opposition demanded explanations from Palocci, including taking the case to the Federal Prosecutor's Office and the Supreme Court. However, the majority of the ruling party prevented Palocci from submitting to the Chamber of Deputies. The protection of the minister by the deputies and the silence of some of his main opponents triggered protests on the internet, as users of the Twitter network showed their discontent with some politicians (both from the ruling base, such as the president of the Senate, José Sarney; and from the opposition, such as Senator Aécio Neves and former governor José Serra, both from the PSDB), who claimed not to see any irregularities. On 7 June, Palocci resigned from his position in the government.

In July 2011, Dilma ordered the removal of the head of the Ministry of Transport, following allegations of overbilling in public works pointed out in a report in Veja magazine, which revealed that representatives of PR, the party of Minister Alfredo Nascimento, and most of the ministry's top management, officials from the ministry and related bodies had set up a scheme to receive bribes from contractors. He was the only one to remain in office and ordered an internal inquiry to be set up to investigate the alleged irregularities involving ministry officials. As the crisis in the Ministry of Transport worsened following suspicions of his son's illicit enrichment, Alfredo Nascimento handed in his letter of resignation to the Presidency of the Republic on 6 July.

On 17 August 2011, Minister of Agriculture Wagner Rossi (PMDB) resigned after accusations involving his management and conduct in the cabinet. In an interview with Veja magazine, Oscar Jucá Neto, former financial director of the Companhia Nacional de Abastecimento (Conab) and brother of the government's leader in the Senate, Romero Jucá (PMDB-RR), called the Brazilian Democratic Movement Party (PMDB), the party of Minister Wagner Rossi and vice president Temer, a "business centre". He was dismissed from his post for authorizing an irregular payment of around 8 million reais to the company of an employee. According to Neto, Conab was delaying the transfer of 14.9 million reais to Caramuru Alimentos to increase the amount to be paid by 20 million reais. Of this total, 5 million reais would be passed on to ministry officials. In another accusation, a report in the Folha de S.Paulo newspaper pointed out that Rossi had turned Conab into a hanger for jobs to accommodate relatives of PMDB political leaders. Regarding the appointments, he said that he had placed "qualified people" in the state-owned company.

Época magazine published a report based on videos, documents and checks that are part of a secret investigation by the Federal Public Prosecutor's Office and the Federal Police into irregularities at the ANP (National Petroleum Agency), a special agency linked to the Ministry of Mines and Energy, under the command of Edison Lobão (PMDB). In one of the recordings, two of the agency's advisors demand a bribe of 40,000 reais to solve a client's problem. The report also obtained a copy of a check that one of the ANP advisors received from a lawyer linked to the country's biggest fuel adulterator.

On 26 October 2011, Minister of Sports Orlando Silva Jr. (PCdoB) left the government, also after a series of accusations of corruption were published in the press. The main one was that he was involved in a scheme to embezzle public money from Segundo Tempo, a federal government programme designed to promote sport in underprivileged communities. According to Silva Jr., there was and is no proof of his involvement. Orlando's resignation came a day after the Supreme Court authorized the opening of an investigation into him, at the request of the Public Prosecutor's Office.

For a newly formed government, of the total number of ministries, which is just over 20, almost a third has already been compromised. [...] There was something wrong with the appointments. And Dilma elected them, she chose them. She bears responsibility for what is happening. Nobody is obliged to accept the appointment of future ministers from a previous government.

In December 2011, reports in the Brazilian press raised suspicions about the conduct of the Minister of Development, Industry and Foreign Trade, Fernando Pimentel. According to an article in the newspaper O Estado de S. Paulo, the Federation of Industries of Minas Gerais (Fiemg), the main client of Fernando's consultancy firm, was responsible for defining the benefits for industry.

== Impeachment ==
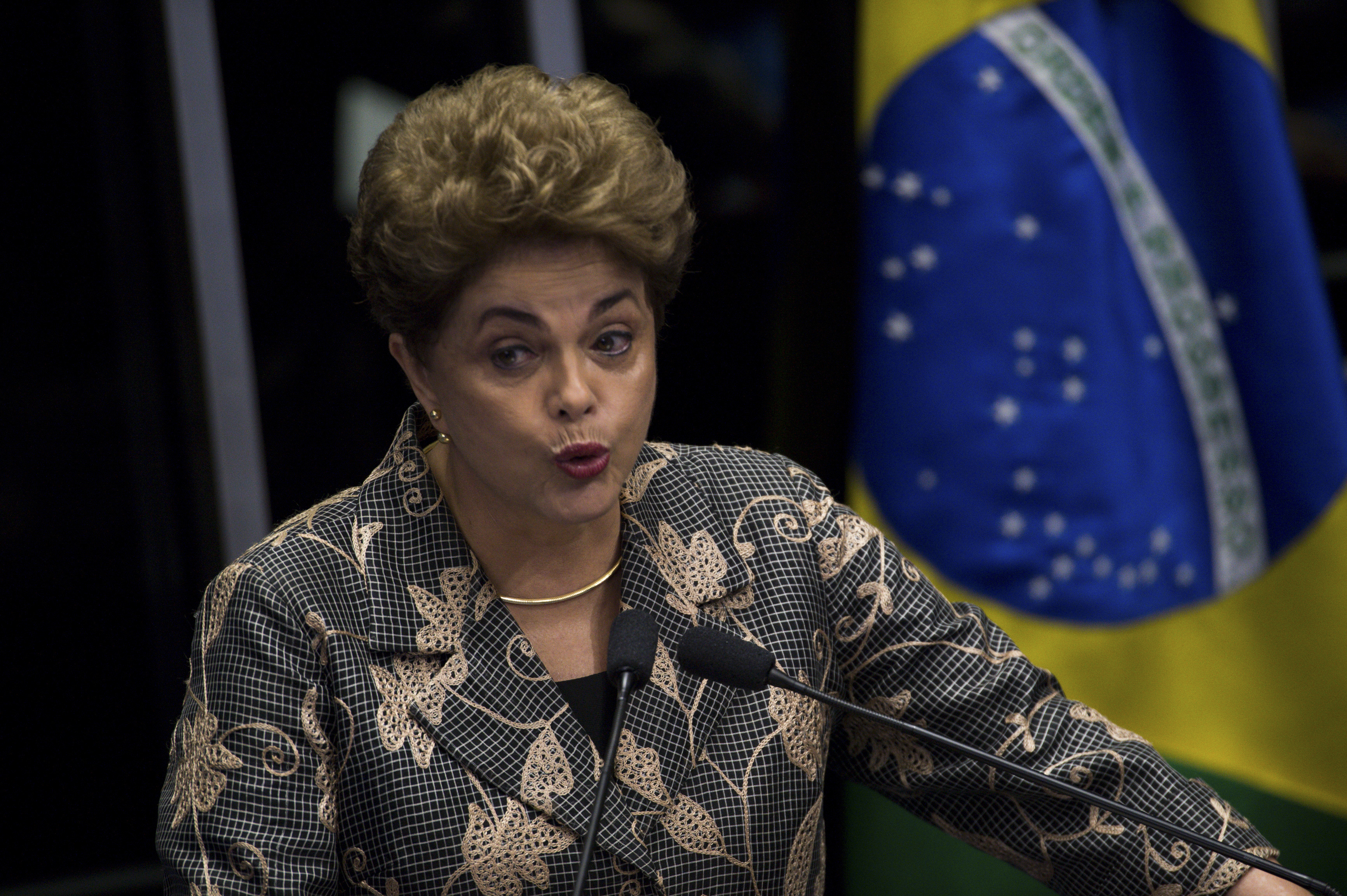
Dilma on 30 August 2016 during her impeachment trial

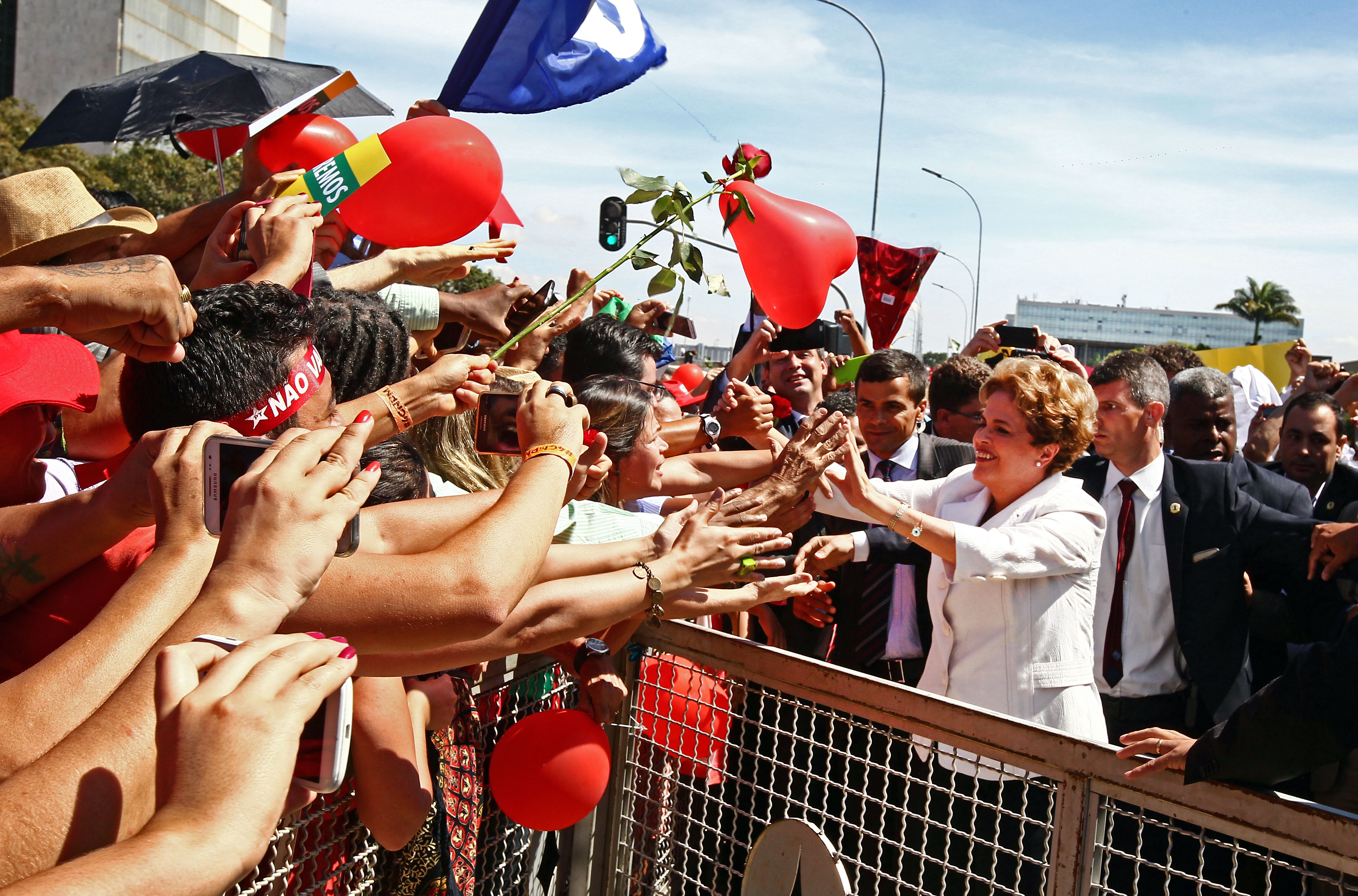
Dilma meets supporters in front of the Planalto Palace after being ousted on 12 May 2016

On 2 December 2015, the president of the Chamber of Deputies, Eduardo Cunha, accepted one of the seven impeachment requests against Dilma, which had been filed by jurists Hélio Bicudo, Miguel Reale Júnior and Janaína Paschoal, and delivered to Cunha just over two months earlier. The original request included accusations of decrees signed by the president in 2015 to release R$2.5 billion without the approval of Congress or a budget provision. This operation wasknown as pedalada fiscal and would characterize administrative improbity.

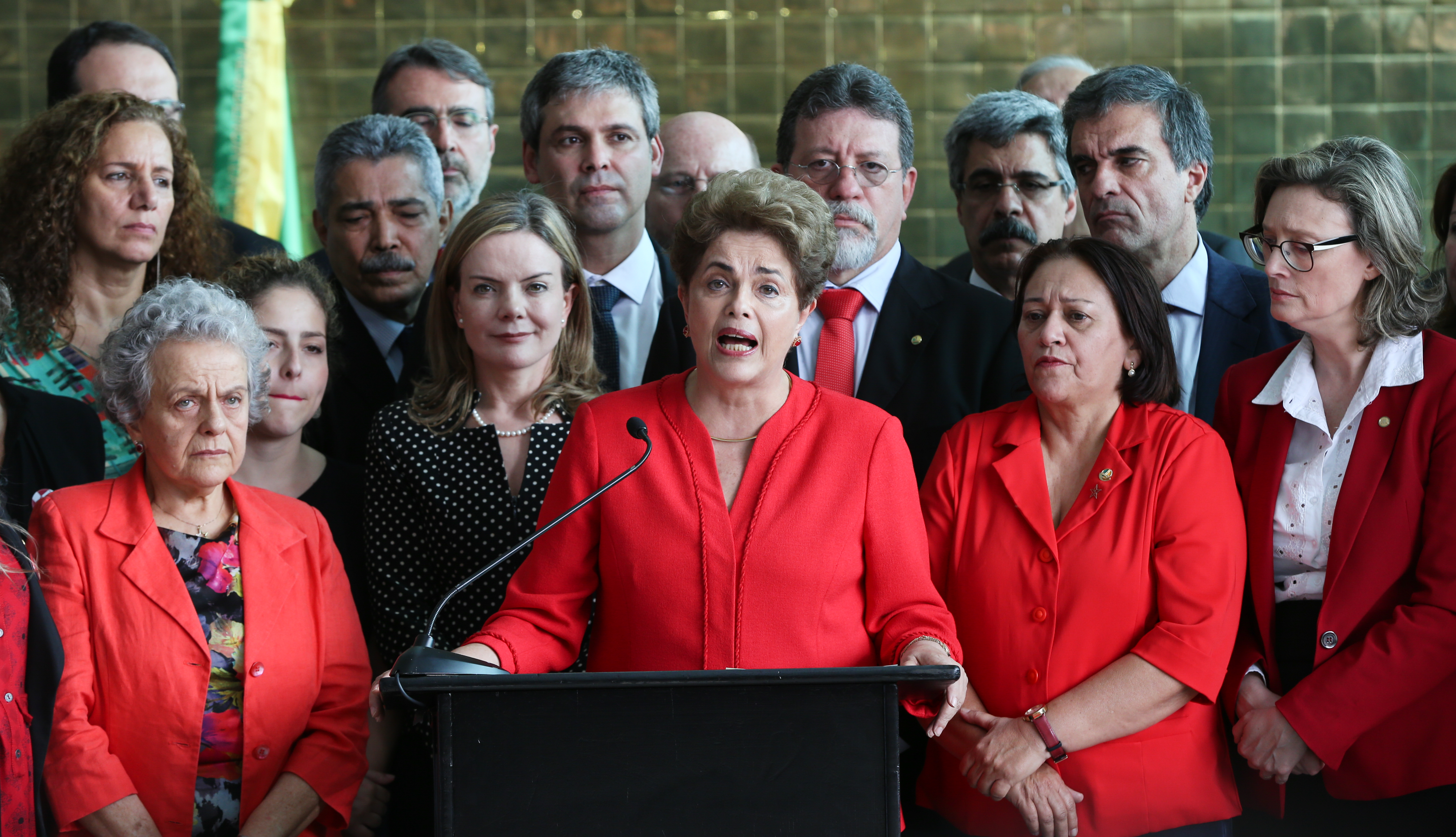
Dilma's speech, attended by ministers, deputies and senators, after the impeachment vote

The acceptance of the impeachment request was seen by some of the media as retaliation against the president's party, whose deputies announced that same day that they would vote against Cunha in the Ethics Council, where he was investigated for his alleged participation in the scheme exposed in Car Wash Operation. Cunha denied any relationship of "bargaining" with the government, stating that "the decision to accept the impeachment is factual, concrete and has a clear definition", but continued to blame Dilma for the investigations against him. According to Luiz Inácio Lula da Silva, Dilma didn't have "the will to do politics" and didn't hold meetings with the parties to try to prevent the impeachment.

Due to the parliamentary recess and the lawsuits filed by deputies with the Federal Supreme Court with the aim of formally deciding the rite of the process, the Chamber of Deputies only elected the 65 members of the special committee that would analyse the impeachment request against Dilma on 17 March 2016, in an open vote. There were 433 votes in favour and only one against. On 11 April, the special committee, with 38 votes in favour and 27 against, approved the rapporteur's opinion, which defended the admissibility of the process to remove the president. The opinion drawn up by deputy Jovair Arantes proceeded to the House plenary for consideration.

On Sunday, 17 April 2016, the Chamber of Deputies, with 367 votes in favour, 137 against, 7 abstentions and 2 absent, authorized the Federal Senate to initiate impeachment proceedings against Dilma.

On 6 May 2016, the Senate's special impeachment committee approved, by fifteen votes to five, the report by Senator Antonio Anastasia, in favour of continuing the process to remove Dilma. On 11 May, Teori Zavascki denied the government's request to annul Dilma's impeachment process. With this decision, the Senate will continue to vote on whether to remove the president from the Planalto Palace. On 12 May 2016, with 55 votes in favour, 22 against and two absent, the Federal Senate authorized the opening of the impeachment process, and ordered her removal from the Presidency of the Republic for a period of up to 180 days. On 31 August, the Federal Senate, by 61 votes to 20, removed Dilma's mandate as president, but maintained her right to hold public office.
