= Cabinet of Dilma Rousseff =

Cabinets of Brazil, 2011–2016

Rousseff Cabinet
- Cabinet of Brazil
- 2011–2016
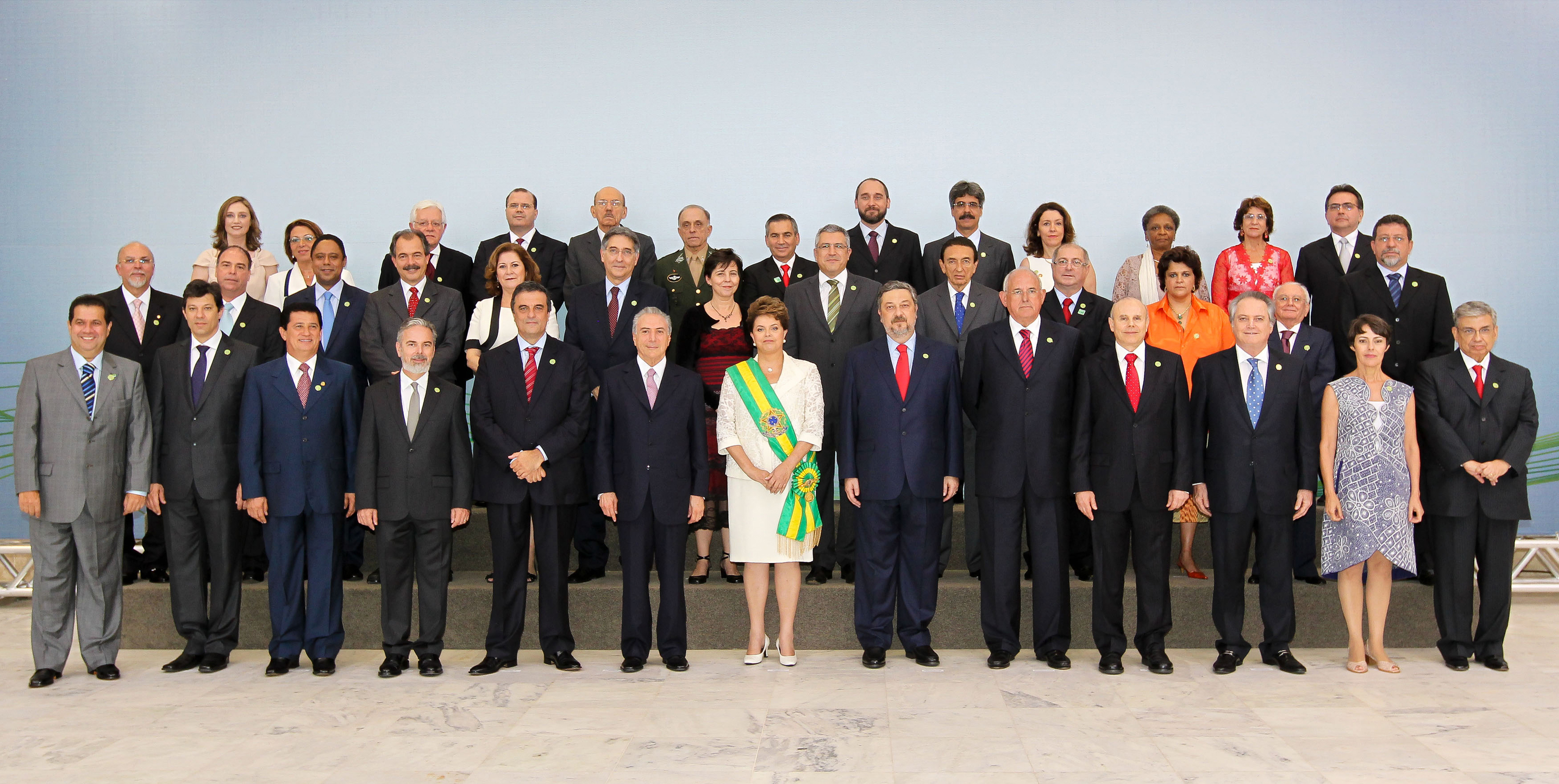
- Cabinet of President Dilma Rousseff in January 2011
- Date formed: 1 January 2011
- Date dissolved: 12 May 2016

People and organisations
- President: Dilma Rousseff
- President's history: Former Chief of Staff of the Presidency (2005–2010); Former Minister of Mines and Energy (2003–2005)
- Vice President: Michel Temer
- No. of ministers: 40
- Member parties: 2011–2015: Workers' Party (Brazil); Brazilian Democratic Movement Party; Party of the Republic; Brazilian Socialist Party; Democratic Labour Party; Social Christian Party; Communist Party of Brazil; Brazilian Republican Party; 2015–2016: Workers' Party; Brazilian Democratic Movement Party; Progressive Party; Social Democratic Party; Party of the Republic; Brazilian Republican Party; Democratic Labour Party; Republican Party of the Social Order; Communist Party of Brazil
- Status in legislature: 2011–2016: Majority coalition; April 2016: Minority coalition
- Opposition parties: 2011–2015: Brazilian Social Democracy Party; Democrats; Popular Socialist Party; Socialism and Liberty Party; 2015–2016: Brazilian Social Democracy Party; Brazilian Socialist Party; Brazilian Labour Party; Democrats; Solidariedade; Social Christian Party; Popular Socialist Party; Humanist Party of Solidarity; National Labour Party; Green Party; Social Liberal Party; Brazilian Labour Renewal Party

History
- Outgoing formation: Impeachment of Dilma Rousseff
- Elections: 2010 general election 2014 general election
- Legislature terms: 54th Legislature of the National Congress; 55th Legislature of the National Congress
- Advice and consent: Federal Senate
- Predecessor: First cabinet of Lula da Silva
- Successor: Cabinet of Michel Temer

After the 2010 election, Dilma Rousseff became the first woman to be President of Brazil. Her cabinet was unveiled in November 2010. A second cabinet was formed after the 2014 election.

== Supporting parties ==
=== First term ===
Party	Main ideology
Government parties
Workers' Party (PT)	Social democracy
Brazilian Democratic Movement Party (PMDB)	Big tent
Democratic Labour Party (PDT)	Labourism
Communist Party of Brazil (PCdoB)	Communism
Brazilian Socialist Party (PSB)	Progressivism
Party of the Republic (PR)	Conservatism
Brazilian Republican Party (PRB)	Social conservatism
Social Christian Party (PSC)	Social conservatism
Christian Labour Party (PTC)	Economic liberalism
National Labour Party (PTN)	Labourism

=== Second term (until 2016) ===
Party	Main ideology
Government parties
Workers' Party (PT)	Social democracy
Brazilian Democratic Movement Party (PMDB)	Big tent
Democratic Labour Party (PDT)	Labourism
Communist Party of Brazil (PCdoB)	Communism
Party of the Republic (PR)	Conservatism
Brazilian Republican Party (PRB)	Social conservatism
Social Democratic Party (PSD)	Big tent
Progressive Party (PP)	Liberal conservatism
Republican Party of the Social Order (PROS)	Republicanism

=== Second term (from 2016) ===
Party	Main ideology
Government parties
Workers' Party (PT)	Social democracy
Democratic Labour Party (PDT)	Labourism
Communist Party of Brazil (PCdoB)	Communism

== Cabinet ==
Party key	PT	PMDB	PSB	PSD
Party key	PR	PP	PDT	PCdoB
Party key	PTB	PROS	PRB	No party

Portfolio	Portrait	Minister	Took office	Left office	Note
Cabinet ministers
		Michel Temer	1 January 2011	31 August 2016	Acting president from 12 May to 31 August 2016
Chief of Staff		Antonio Palocci	1 January 2011	7 June 2011	
Chief of Staff		Gleisi Hoffmann	8 June 2011	2 February 2014	
Chief of Staff		Aloizio Mercadante	2 February 2014	2 October 2015	
Chief of Staff		Jaques Wagner	2 October 2015	17 March 2016	
Chief of Staff		Luiz Inácio Lula da Silva	17 March 2016	18 March 2016	Swearing in ceremony suspended
Chief of Staff		Eva Chiavon	22 March 2016	12 May 2016	Acting minister
Secretary of Civil Aviation		Wagner Bittencourt	18 March 2011	15 March 2013	
Secretary of Civil Aviation		Moreira Franco	15 March 2013	1 January 2015	
Secretary of Civil Aviation		Eliseu Padilha	1 January 2015	4 December 2015	
Secretary of Civil Aviation		Guilherme Ramalho	7 December 2015	17 March 2016	Acting minister
Secretary of Civil Aviation		Mauro Lopes	17 March 2016	18 April 2016	
Secretary of Civil Aviation		Guilherme Ramalho	18 April 2016	12 May 2016	Acting minister
Secretary-General of the Presidency		Gilberto Carvalho	1 January 2011	1 January 2015	
Secretary-General of the Presidency		Miguel Rossetto	1 January 2015	2 October 2015	
Secretary of Government		Ricardo Berzoini	2 October 2015	12 May 2016	
Secretary of Human Rights		Maria do Rosário	1 January 2011	1 April 2014	
Secretary of Human Rights		Ideli Salvatti	1 April 2014	16 April 2015	
Secretary of Human Rights		Pepe Vargas	16 April 2015	2 October 2015	
Secretary of Institutional Affairs		Luiz Sérgio Nóbrega	1 January 2011	10 June 2011	
Secretary of Institutional Affairs		Ideli Salvatti	10 June 2011	1 April 2014	
Secretary of Institutional Affairs		Ricardo Berzoini	1 April 2014	1 January 2015	
Secretary of Institutional Affairs		Pepe Vargas	1 January 2015	7 April 2015	
Secretary of Insitutional Security		José Elito Siqueira	1 January 2011	2 October 2015	
Secretary of Insitutional Security		Marcos Amaro dos Santos	2 October 2015	12 May 2016	
Secretary of Micro and Small Business		Guilherme Afif Domingos	6 May 2013	2 October 2015	
Secretary of Politics for Women		Iriny Lopes	1 January 2011	10 February 2012	
Secretary of Politics for Women		Eleonora Menicucci	10 February 2012	2 October 2015	
Secretary of Ports and Water Transports		Leônidas Cristino	1 January 2011	3 October 2013	
Secretary of Ports and Water Transports		Antonio Pinheiro	3 October 2013	26 June 2014	
Secretary of Ports and Water Transports		César Borges	26 June 2014	1 January 2015	
Secretary of Ports and Water Transports		Edson Coelho Araújo	1 January 2015	2 October 2015	
Secretary of Ports and Water Transports		Helder Barbalho	2 October 2015	20 April 2016	
Secretary of Ports and Water Transports		Maurício Muniz	20 April 2016	12 May 2016	
Secretary of Promotion of Racial Equality		Luiza Helena de Bairros	1 January 2011	1 January 2015	
Secretary of Promotion of Racial Equality		Nilma Lino Gomes	1 January 2015	2 October 2015	
Secretary of Social Communication		Helena Chagas	1 January 2011	3 February 2014	
Secretary of Social Communication		Thomas Traumann	3 February 2014	25 March 2015	
Secretary of Social Communication		Edinho Silva	31 March 2015	12 May 2016	
Secretary of Strategic Affairs		Moreira Franco	1 January 2011	15 March 2013	
Secretary of Strategic Affairs		Marcelo Neri	22 March 2013	5 February 2015	
Secretary of Strategic Affairs		Roberto Mangabeira Unger	5 February 2015	14 September 2015	
Secretary of Strategic Affairs		Vitor Pinto Chaves	14 September 2015	2 October 2015	
Attorney General		Luis Inácio Adams	23 October 2009	3 March 2016	
Attorney General		José Eduardo Cardozo	3 March 2016	12 May 2016	
Comptroller General		Jorge Hage	31 March 2006	1 January 2015	
Comptroller General		Valdir Simão	1 January 2015	21 December 2015	
Comptroller General		Carlos Higino	21 December 2015	29 February 2016	Acting comptroller
Comptroller General		Luiz Navarro de Brito	29 February 2016	12 May 2016	
Minister of Agrarian Development		Afonso Florence	1 January 2011	14 March 2012	
Minister of Agrarian Development		Pepe Vargas	14 March 2012	17 March 2014	
Minister of Agrarian Development		Miguel Rossetto	17 March 2014	1 January 2015	
Minister of Agrarian Development		Patrus Ananias	1 January 2015	12 May 2016	
Minister of Agriculture, Livestock and Supply		Wagner Rossi	1 April 2010	17 August 2011	
Minister of Agriculture, Livestock and Supply		Mendes Ribeiro Filho	18 August 2011	16 March 2013	
Minister of Agriculture, Livestock and Supply		Antônio Andrade	16 March 2013	17 March 2014	
Minister of Agriculture, Livestock and Supply		Neri Geller	17 March 2014	1 January 2015	
Minister of Agriculture, Livestock and Supply		Kátia Abreu	1 January 2015	12 May 2016	
Minister of Cities		Mário Negromonte	1 January 2011	2 February 2012	
Minister of Cities		Aguinaldo Ribeiro	7 February 2012	17 March 2014	
Minister of Cities		Gilberto Occhi	17 March 2014	1 January 2015	
Minister of Cities		Gilberto Kassab	1 January 2015	15 April 2016	
Minister of Cities		Inês Magalhães	15 April 2016	12 May 2016	
Minister of Communications		Paulo Bernardo	1 January 2011	1 January 2015	
Minister of Communications		Ricardo Berzoini	1 January 2015	2 October 2015	
Minister of Communications		André Figueiredo	2 October 2015	12 May 2016	
Minister of Culture		Ana de Hollanda	1 January 2011	13 September 2012	
Minister of Culture		Marta Suplicy	13 September 2012	11 November 2014	
Minister of Culture		Ana Cristina Wanzeler	11 November 2014	1 January 2015	Acting minister
Minister of Culture		Juca Ferreira	1 January 2015	12 May 2016	
Minister of Defense		Nelson Jobim	1 January 2011	4 August 2011	
Minister of Defense		Celso Amorim	4 August 2011	1 January 2015	
Minister of Defense		Jaques Wagner	1 January 2015	2 October 2015	
Minister of Defense		Aldo Rebelo	2 October 2015	12 May 2016	
Minister of Development, Industry and Foreign Trade		Fernando Pimentel	1 January 2011	14 February 2014	
Minister of Development, Industry and Foreign Trade		Mauro Borges Lemos	14 February 2014	1 January 2015	
Minister of Development, Industry and Foreign Trade		Armando Monteiro	1 January 2015	12 May 2016	
Minister of Education		Fernando Haddad	1 January 2011	23 January 2012	
Minister of Education		Aloizio Mercadante	23 January 2012	3 February 2014	
Minister of Education		José Henrique Paim	3 February 2014	1 January 2015	
Minister of Education		Cid Gomes	1 January 2015	18 March 2015	
Minister of Education		Luiz Cláudio Costa	18 March 2015	6 April 2015	Acting minister
Minister of Education		Renato Janine Ribeiro	6 April 2105	30 September 2015	
Minister of Education		Aloizio Mercadante	2 October 2015	12 May 2016	
Minister of Environment		Izabella Teixeira	1 January 2011	12 May 2016	
Minister of Finance		Guido Mantega	27 March 2006	1 January 2015	
Minister of Finance		Joaquim Levy	1 January 2015	18 December 2015	
Minister of Finance		Nelson Barbosa	18 December 2015	12 May 2016	
Minister of Fishing and Aquaculture		Ideli Salvatti	1 January 2011	10 June 2011	
Minister of Fishing and Aquaculture		Luiz Sérgio Nóbrega	10 June 2011	2 March 2012	
Minister of Fishing and Aquaculture		Marcelo Crivella	2 March 2012	17 March 2014	
Minister of Fishing and Aquaculture		Eduardo Lopes	17 March 2014	1 January 2015	
Minister of Fishing and Aquaculture		Helder Barbalho	1 January 2015	12 May 2016	
Minister of Foreign Affairs		Antonio Patriota	1 January 2011	26 August 2013	
Minister of Foreign Affairs		Luiz Alberto Figueiredo	26 August 2013	1 January 2015	
Minister of Foreign Affairs		Mauro Vieira	1 January 2015	12 May 2016	
Minister of Health		Alexandre Padilha	1 January 2011	2 February 2014	
Minister of Health		Arthur Chioro	2 February 2014	2 October 2015	
Minister of Health		Marcelo Castro	2 October 2015	12 May 2016	
Minister of Justice		José Eduardo Cardozo	1 January 2011	3 March 2016	
Minister of Justice		Wellington Lima e Silva	3 March 2016	14 March 2016	
Minister of Justice		Eugênio Aragão	14 March 2016	12 May 2016	
Minister of Labour and Employment		Carlos Lupi	1 January 2011	4 December 2011	
Minister of Labour and Employment		Paulo Santos Pinto	4 December 2011	30 April 2012	Acting minister
Minister of Labour and Employment		Brizola Neto	30 April 2012	15 March 2013	
Minister of Labour and Employment		Manoel Dias	15 March 2013	2 October 2015	
Minister of Labour and Employment		Miguel Rossetto	2 October 2015	12 May 2016	
Minister of Mines and Energy		Edison Lobão	1 January 2011	1 January 2015	
Minister of Mines and Energy		Eduardo Braga	1 January 2015	20 April 2016	
Minister of Mines and Energy		Marco Antônio Almeida	21 April 2016	12 May 2016	
Minister of National Integration		Fernando Bezerra Coelho	1 January 2011	1 October 2013	
Minister of National Integration		Francisco Teixeira	1 October 2013	1 January 2015	
Minister of National Integration		Gilberto Occhi	1 January 2015	13 April 2016	
Minister of National Integration		Josélio de Andrade Moura	13 April 2016	12 May 2016	
Minister of Planning, Budget and Management		Miriam Belchior	1 January 2011	1 January 2015	
Minister of Planning, Budget and Management		Nelson Barbosa	1 January 2015	18 December 2015	
Minister of Planning, Budget and Management		Valdir Simão	18 December 2015	12 May 2016	
Minister of Science, Technology and Innovation		Aloizio Mercadante	1 January 2011	23 January 2012	
Minister of Science, Technology and Innovation		Marco Antonio Raupp	24 January 2012	17 March 2014	
Minister of Science, Technology and Innovation		Clélio Campolina Diniz	17 March 2014	1 January 2015	
Minister of Science, Technology and Innovation		Aldo Rebelo	1 January 2015	2 October 2015	
Minister of Science, Technology and Innovation		Celso Pansera	2 October 2015	14 April 2016	
Minister of Science, Technology and Innovation		Emilia Ribeiro Cury	14 April 2016	12 May 2016	
Minister of Social Development and Fight against Hunger		Tereza Campello	1 January 2011	12 May 2016	
Minister of Social Security		Garibaldi Alves Filho	1 January 2011	1 January 2015	
Minister of Social Security		Carlos Eduardo Gabas	1 January 2015	2 October 2015	
Minister of Sports		Orlando Silva	1 January 2011	26 October 2011	
Minister of Sports		Aldo Rebelo	26 October 2011	1 January 2015	
Minister of Sports		George Hilton	1 January 2015	23 March 2016	
Minister of Sports		Ricardo Leyser	31 March 2016	12 May 2016	
Minister of Tourism		Pedro Novais	1 January 2011	14 September 2011	
Minister of Tourism		Gastão Vieira	14 September 2011	17 March 2014	
Minister of Tourism		Vinicius Lages	17 March 2014	16 April 2015	
Minister of Tourism		Henrique Eduardo Alves	16 April 2015	28 March 2016	
Minister of Tourism		Alberto Alves	28 March 2016	21 April 2016	Acting minister
Minister of Tourism		Alessandro Teixeira	21 April 2016	12 May 2016	
Minister of Transport		Alfredo Nascimento	1 January 2011	6 July 2011	
Minister of Transport		Paulo Sérgio Passos	6 July 2011	1 April 2013	
Minister of Transport		César Borges	1 April 2013	26 June 2014	
Minister of Transport		Paulo Sérgio Passos	26 June 2014	1 January 2015	
Minister of Transport		Antonio Carlos Rodrigues	1 January 2015	12 May 2016	
Minister of Women, Racial Equality and Human Rights		Nilma Lino Gomes	2 October 2015	12 May 2016	
Non-cabinet positions
President of the Central Bank		Alexandre Tombini	1 January 2011	13 June 2016	
Chairman of the Brazilian Development Bank		Luciano Coutinho	1 May 2007	16 May 2016	
CEO of Petrobras		Sérgio Gabrielli	22 July 2005	13 February 2012	
CEO of Petrobras		Graça Foster	13 February 2012	4 February 2015	
CEO of Petrobras		Aldemir Bendine	6 February 2015	30 May 2016	
Chie o the Joint Staff of the Armed Forces		José Carlos de Nardi	6 September 2010	7 December 2015	
Chie o the Joint Staff of the Armed Forces		Ademir Sobrinho	7 December 2015	15 January 2019	
Commander of the Brazilian Army		Enzo Martins Peri	27 February 2007	7 January 2015	
Commander of the Brazilian Army		Eduardo Villas Bôas	5 February 2015	11 January 2019	
Commander of the Brazilian Navy		Júlio Soares Neto	1 March 2007	7 February 2015	
Commander of the Brazilian Navy		Eduardo Bacellar Ferreira	7 February 2015	9 January 2019	
Commander of the Brazilian Air Force		Juniti Saito	1 March 2007	30 January 2015	
Commander of the Brazilian Air Force		Nivaldo Luiz Rossato	30 January 2015	4 January 2019	
