= First cabinet of Lula da Silva =

Cabinet of ministers of president Lula in his first term (2003 - 2006)

Lula Cabinet
- Cabinet of Brazil
- 2003–2011
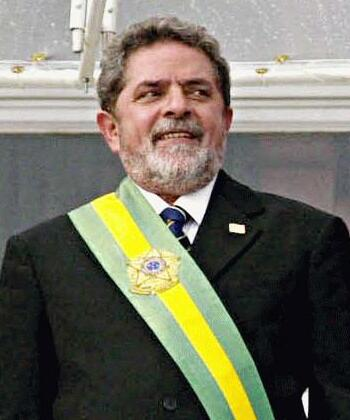
- Date formed: 1 January 2003
- Date dissolved: 1 January 2011

People and organisations
- President: Luiz Inácio Lula da Silva
- President's history: Former Federal Deputy from São Paulo (1987–1991)
- Vice President: José Alencar
- No. of ministers: 35
- Member parties: 2003–2007: Brazilian Democratic Movement Party; Workers' Party; Progressive Party; Brazilian Labour Party; Liberal Party; Brazilian Socialist Party; Communist Party of Brazil; 2007–2011: Brazilian Democratic Movement Party; Workers' Party; Progressive Party; Brazilian Socialist Party; Democratic Labour Party; Party of the Republic; Brazilian Labour Party; Green Party; Communist Party of Brazil
- Status in legislature: Majority coalition
- Opposition parties: 2003–2007: Liberal Front Party; Brazilian Social Democracy Party; Democratic Labour Party; Popular Socialist Party; Green Party; Socialism and Liberty Party; Social Christian Party; Party of the Reconstruction of the National Order; 2007–2011: Brazilian Social Democracy Party; Democrats; Popular Socialist Party; Social Christian Party; Party of the Reconstruction of the National Order

History
- Elections: 2002 general election 2006 general election
- Legislature terms: 52nd Legislature of the National Congress; 53rd Legislature of the National Congress
- Advice and consent: Federal Senate
- Predecessor: Cabinet of Fernando Henrique Cardoso
- Successor: Cabinet of Dilma Rousseff

After the 2002 election, Luiz Inácio Lula da Silva became the first left-wing and first metalworker and trade unionist president of Brazil. His inauguration marked the first time since 1961 when a president elected by direct popular vote passed the presidential sash to another president elected by popular vote. Lula's cabinet was unveiled in December 2002. A second cabinet was formed after the 2006 election.

Cabinet members
Portfolio	Minister	Took office	Left office	Party
Chief of Staff	José Dirceu	1 January 2003	21 June 2005	PT
Chief of Staff	Dilma Rousseff	21 June 2005	30 March 2010	PT
Chief of Staff	Erenice Guerra	30 March 2010	16 September 2010	PT
Chief of Staff	Carlos Esteves Lima	16 September 2010	1 January 2011	Independent
Secretary-General of the Presidency	Luiz Dulci	1 January 2003	1 January 2011	PT
Secretary of Human Rights	Nilmário Miranda	1 January 2003	10 August 2005	PT
Secretary of Human Rights	Mário Mamede Filho	10 August 2005	21 December 2005	PT
Secretary of Human Rights	Paulo Vannuchi	21 December 2005	1 January 2011	PT
Secretary of Institutional Affairs	Jaques Wagner	20 July 2005	31 March 2006	PT
Secretary of Institutional Affairs	Tarso Genro	31 March 2006	16 March 2007	PT
Secretary of Institutional Affairs	Walfrido dos Mares Guia	16 March 2007	26 November 2007	PTB
Secretary of Institutional Affairs	José Múcio	26 November 2007	28 September 2009	PTB
Secretary of Institutional Affairs	Alexandre Padilha	28 September 2009	1 January 2011	PT
Secretary of Institutional Security	Jorge Armando Felix	1 January 2003	1 January 2011	Independent
Secretary of Politics for Women	Emília Fernandes	1 January 2003	29 January 2004	PT
Secretary of Politics for Women	Nilcea Freire	29 January 2004	1 January 2011	PT
Secretary of Politics to Promote Racial Equality	Matilde Ribeiro	1 January 2003	6 February 2008	PT
Secretary of Politics to Promote Racial Equality	Edson Santos	6 February 2008	31 March 2010	PT
Secretary of Politics to Promote Racial Equality	Eloi Ferreira	31 March 2010	1 January 2011	PT
Secretary of Ports	Pedro Brito	15 May 2007	1 January 2011	PSB
Secretary of Social Communication	Luiz Gushiken	1 January 2003	22 July 2005	PT
Secretary of Social Communication	Luiz Tadeu Rigo	1 August 2005	1 January 2007	Independent
Secretary of Social Communication	Franklin Martins	1 January 2007	1 January 2011	Independent
Secretary of Strategic Affairs	Roberto Mangabeira Unger	18 June 2007	30 June 2009	Independent
Secretary of Strategic Affairs	Samuel Guimarães	20 October 2009	1 January 2011	Independent
Attorney General	Álvaro Ribeiro Costa	1 January 2003	11 March 2007	Independent
Attorney General	Dias Toffoli	11 March 2007	23 October 2009	Independent
Attorney General	Luís Inácio Adams	23 October 2009	3 March 2016	Independent
Comptroller General	Waldir Pires	1 January 2003	31 March 2006	PT
Comptroller General	Jorge Hage	31 March 2006	1 January 2015	Independent
Minister of Agrarian Development	Miguel Rossetto	1 January 2003	31 March 2006	PT
Minister of Agrarian Development	Guilherme Cassel	31 March 2006	1 January 2011	PT
Minister of Agriculture	Roberto Rodrigues	1 January 2003	30 June 2006	Independent
Minister of Agriculture	Luis Carlos Guedes	3 July 2006	22 March 2007	MDB
Minister of Agriculture	Reinhold Stephanes	22 March 2007	31 March 2010	MDB
Minister of Agriculture	Wagner Rossi	31 March 2010	17 August 2011	MDB
Minister of Cities	Olívio Dutra	1 January 2003	20 July 2005	PT
Minister of Cities	Márcio Fortes de Almeida	20 July 2005	1 January 2011	Independent
Minister of Communications	Miro Teixeira	1 January 2003	1 January 2004	PDT
Minister of Communications	Eunício Oliveira	23 January 2004	8 July 2005	MDB
Minister of Communications	Hélio Costa	8 July 2005	1 April 2010	MDB
Minister of Communications	José Artur Filardi	1 April 2010	1 January 2011	MDB
Minister of Culture	Gilberto Gil	1 January 2003	30 July 2008	PV
Minister of Culture	Juca Ferreira	30 July 2008	1 January 2011	PV
Minister of Defence	José Viegas Filho	1 January 2003	8 November 2004	Independent
Minister of Defence	José Alencar	8 November 2004	31 March 2006	PL
Minister of Defence	Waldir Pires	31 March 2006	25 June 2007	PT
Minister of Defence	Nelson Jobim	25 June 2007	5 August 2011	Independent
Minister of Development, Industry and Foreign Trade	Luiz Fernando Furlan	1 January 2003	29 March 2007	Independent
Minister of Development, Industry and Foreign Trade	Miguel Jorge	29 March 2007	1 January 2011	Independent
Minister of Education	Cristovam Buarque	1 January 2003	27 January 2004	PT
Minister of Education	Tarso Genro	27 January 2004	29 July 2005	PT
Minister of Education	Fernando Haddad	29 July 2005	23 January 2012	PT
Minister of Environment	Marina Silva	1 January 2003	13 May 2008	PT
Minister of Environment	Carlos Minc	13 May 2008	31 March 2010	PT
Minister of Environment	Izabella Teixeira	31 March 2010	12 May 2016	Independent
Minister of Finance	Antonio Palocci	1 January 2003	27 March 2006	PT
Minister of Finance	Guido Mantega	27 March 2006	1 January 2015	PT
Minister of Fishing and Aquaculture	José Fritsch	1 January 2003	31 March 2006	PT
Minister of Fishing and Aquaculture	Altemir Gregolin	31 March 2006	1 January 2011	PT
Minister of Foreign Affairs	Celso Amorim	1 January 2003	1 January 2011	MDB
Minister of Health	Humberto Costa	1 January 2003	8 July 2005	PT
Minister of Health	José Saraiva Felipe	8 July 2005	31 March 2006	MDB
Minister of Health	Agenor Álvares	31 March 2006	16 March 2007	Independent
Minister of Health	José Gomes Temporão	16 March 2007	1 January 2011	MDB
Minister of Justice	Márcio Thomaz Bastos	1 January 2003	16 March 2007	Independent
Minister of Justice	Tarso Genro	16 March 2007	10 February 2010	PT
Minister of Justice	Luiz Paulo Barreto	10 February 2010	1 January 2011	Independent
Minister of Labour and Employment	Jaques Wagner	1 January 2003	23 January 2004	PT
Minister of Labour and Employment	Ricardo Berzoini	23 January 2004	12 July 2005	PT
Minister of Labour and Employment	Luiz Marinho	12 July 2005	29 March 2007	PT
Minister of Labour and Employment	Carlos Lupi	29 March 2007	5 December 2011	PDT
Minister of Mines and Energy	Dilma Rousseff	1 January 2003	21 June 2005	PT
Minister of Mines and Energy	Mauricio Tolmasquin	21 June 2005	8 July 2005	Independent
Minister of Mines and Energy	Silas Rondeau	8 July 2005	24 May 2007	Independent
Minister of Mines and Energy	Nelson Hubner	24 May 2007	21 January 2008	Independent
Minister of Mines and Energy	Edison Lobão	21 January 2008	31 March 2010	MDB
Minister of Mines and Energy	Márcio Zimmermann	31 March 2010	1 January 2011	MDB
Minister of National Integration	Ciro Gomes	1 January 2003	31 March 2006	PPS
Minister of National Integration	Pedro Brito	3 April 2006	16 March 2007	PSB
Minister of National Integration	Geddel Vieira Lima	16 March 2007	31 March 2010	MDB
Minister of National Integration	João Santana	31 March 2010	1 January 2011	MDB
Minister of Planning, Budget and Management	Guido Mantega	1 January 2003	18 November 2004	PT
Minister of Planning, Budget and Management	Nelson Machado	18 November 2004	22 March 2005	Independent
Minister of Planning, Budget and Management	Paulo Bernardo	22 March 2005	1 January 2011	PT
Minister of Science and Technology	Roberto Amaral	1 January 2003	21 January 2004	PSB
Minister of Science and Technology	Eduardo Campos	21 January 2004	18 July 2005	PSB
Minister of Science and Technology	Sérgio Machado Rezende	18 July 2005	1 January 2011	PSB
Minister of Social Development and Fight against Hunger	Patrus Ananias	23 January 2004	31 March 2010	PT
Minister of Social Development and Fight against Hunger	Márcia Lopes	31 March 2010	1 January 2011	PT
Minister of Social Security	Ricardo Berzoini	1 January 2003	23 January 2004	PT
Minister of Social Security	Amir Lando	23 January 2004	22 March 2005	MDB
Minister of Social Security	Romero Jucá	22 March 2005	21 July 2005	MDB
Minister of Social Security	Nelson Machado	21 July 2005	29 March 2007	Independent
Minister of Social Security	Luiz Marinho	29 March 2007	3 June 2008	PT
Minister of Social Security	Carlos Eduardo Gabas	3 June 2008	11 June 2008	PT
Minister of Social Security	José Pimentel	11 June 2008	31 March 2010	PT
Minister of Social Security	Carlos Eduardo Gabas	31 March 2010	1 January 2011	PT
Minister of Sports	Agnelo Queiroz	1 January 2003	31 March 2006	PT
Minister of Sports	Orlando Silva	31 March 2006	26 October 2011	PCdoB
Minister of Tourism	Walfrido dos Mares Guia	1 January 2003	22 March 2007	PTB
Minister of Tourism	Marta Suplicy	22 March 2007	3 June 2008	PT
Minister of Tourism	Luiz Barreto Filho	3 June 2008	1 January 2011	Independent
Minister of Transport	Anderson Adauto	1 January 2003	15 August 2004	PL
Minister of Transport	Alfredo Nascimento	15 August 2004	31 March 2006	PL
Minister of Transport	Paulo Sérgio Passos	3 April 2006	29 March 2007	PR
Minister of Transport	Alfredo Nascimento	29 March 2007	31 March 2010	PR
Minister of Transport	Paulo Sérgio Passos	31 March 2010	1 January 2011	PR

== Non-cabinet positions ==
Cabinet members
Portfolio	Minister	Took office	Left office	Party
President of the Central Bank of Brazil	Henrique Meirelles	1 January 2003	31 December 2010	Independent
Chairman of the Brazilian Development Bank	Carlos Lessa	17 January 2003	18 November 2004	Independent
Chairman of the Brazilian Development Bank	Guido Mantega	22 November 2004	27 March 2006	PT
Chairman of the Brazilian Development Bank	Demian Fiocca	27 March 2006	27 April 2007	Independent
Chairman of the Brazilian Development Bank	Luciano Coutinho	1 May 2007	16 May 2016	Independent
CEO of Petrobras	José Eduardo Dutra	2 January 2003	22 July 2005	Independent
CEO of Petrobras	Sérgio Gabrielli	22 July 2005	13 February 2012	Independent
Chief of the Joint Staff of the Armed Forces	Gen. José Carlos de Nardi	6 September 2010	7 December 2015	Independent
Commander of the Brazilian Army	Gen. Francisco Roberto de Albuquerque	1 January 2003	8 March 2007	Independent
Commander of the Brazilian Army	Gen. Enzo Martins Peri	8 March 2007	5 February 2015	Independent
Commander of the Brazilian Navy	Adm. Roberto de Guimarães Carvalho	3 January 2003	1 March 2007	Independent
Commander of the Brazilian Navy	Adm. Júlio Soares de Moura Neto	1 March 2007	7 February 2015	Independent
Commander of the Brazilian Air Force	Lt. Brig. Luiz Carlos da Silva Bueno	1 January 2003	28 February 2007	Independent
Commander of the Brazilian Air Force	Lt. Brig. Juniti Saito	1 March 2007	29 January 2015	Independent

== See also ==
- Second cabinet of Lula da Silva
