= Reactions to the 8 January Brasília attacks =

Many journalists compared the events of the 8 January Brasília attacks to the January 6 United States Capitol attack almost exactly two years earlier. Several newspapers, including O Globo, Veja, and Folha de S.Paulo, characterised what happened as terrorism. O Estado de S. Paulo and El Mundo described the event as an attempted coup d'état. On 9 January, tens of thousands of people attended rallies against the rioters in many Brazilian cities. The Supreme Federal Court considered the attacks as terrorist acts.

== Domestic ==
=== Government ===
==== Executive ====
Avatar of Lula da Silva

Lula da Silva
(@LulaOficial)
tweeted:

Democracy guarantees the right to free expression, but it also requires people to respect institutions. There is no precedent in the history of the country what they did today. For that they must be punished. And we are going to find out who are the financiers of those who went to Brasilia today, and they will all pay with the force of law.

8 January 2023

President Luiz Inácio Lula da Silva condemned the demonstrators as "vandals, fascists and nazis" in a tweet and called their actions "barbarism". He said that "there was, I would say, incompetence, bad will, bad faith, on the part of the people who take care of public security in the Federal District". Minister of Planning and Budget Simone Tebet called for "exemplary punishments" for the protestors on Twitter. She added that "the Federal Constitution supports our Ministers of Justice and Defense in the use of all rigorous legitimate means for the defense of order, society and democracy". Lula returned to Brasília after the buildings were cleared and visited the Supreme Court and the presidential palace. Minister of Justice Flávio Dino and Vice-President Geraldo Alckmin also criticized the attack on social media. Minister of the Environment and Climate Change Marina Silva (REDE) added that 'The weight of the law must be brought against everyone'

==== Legislative ====
Avatar of Arthur Lira

Arthur Lira
(@ArthurLira_)
tweeted:

I put myself at the disposal of all the Heads of Powers to hold a meeting to make absolutely unquestionable that the three Powers are more united than ever in favor of Democracy.

8 January 2023

President of the Chamber of Deputies Arthur Lira condemned the attacks and called for unity between the three powers of the republic to investigate and punish those involved. The Vice-President of the Chamber of Deputies, Luciano Bivar (UNIÃO), stated that there would be reinforcement of the military police, with new contingents sent to the National Congress and the Planalto Palace. President of the Federal Senate Rodrigo Pacheco wrote a note asking colleagues to repudiate the invasion and stated that actions will be taken.

==== Judiciary ====
Avatar of Alexandre de Moraes

Alexandre de Moraes
(@alexandre)
tweeted:

The despicable terrorist attacks on Democracy and Republican Institutions will be held accountable, as well as the financiers, instigators, previous and current public agents who continue in the illicit conduct of anti-democratic acts. The Judiciary will not fail Brazil!

8 January 2023

The Brazilian superior courts released a joint note to condemn the 8 January attacks:

The Supreme Federal Court, the Superior Electoral Court, the Superior Court of Justice, the Superior Labour Court and the Superior Military Court come to the public to express their indignation at the serious events that took place this Sunday, 8 January, with acts of violence against the three Powers of the Republic and destruction of public property. While expressing solidarity with the legitimately constituted authorities, and who are the target of this absurd aggression, they reiterate to the Brazilian Nation the commitment that the Judiciary will remain firm in its role of guaranteeing fundamental rights and the Democratic State of Law, ensuring the rule of law and the full accountability of those who violate it.

===== Military Public Ministry =====
Three weeks after the attacks, it was reported that Military Public Ministry had not initiated any investigation into the participation of military personnel in the attacks, the inaction was criticized by legal experts.

=== Parties and politicians ===
Avatar of Jair Bolsonaro

Jair Bolsonaro
(@jairbolsonaro)
tweeted:

- Peaceful demonstrations, in the form of the law, are part of democracy. However, depredations and invasions of public buildings as occurred today, as well as those practiced by the left in 2013 and 2017, escape the rule.
- Throughout my mandate, I have always been within the four lines of the Constitution respecting and defending the laws, democracy, transparency and our sacred freedom.
- Furthermore, I repudiate the accusations, without evidence, attributed to me by the current head of the executive of Brazil.

8 January 2023

National President of the Workers' Party Gleisi Hoffmann said that "the DF government (of Ibaneis Rocha) was irresponsible in the face of the invasion of Brasília and the National Congress."

Liberal Party head Valdemar Costa Neto said, "Today is a sad day for the Brazilian nation. We cannot agree with the plundering of the national Congress. All orderly demonstrations are legitimate. Disorder has never been part of our nation's principles. I want to tell you that we vehemently disapprove of this type of attitude and let the law be enforced, strengthening our democracy" but also denied that the protestors were affiliated with or represented Bolsonaro. On 11 January, he stated that any member of the party involved in the attack would be expelled.

Bolsonaro himself condemned the rioters in a tweet and denied responsibility. On 10 January, he claimed in a video that Lula had lost the election but deleted it soon afterwards. Supporters of Bolsonaro, like Senator Carlos Portinho, denounced acts of violence. Portinho, however, blamed the legal "superpowers" of Supreme Federal Court Judge Alexandre de Moraes for the aggressive protests, calling for their removal to "appease" the protestors. Another Bolsonaro supporter, former federal judge and the senator for Paraná, Sergio Moro (UNIÃO), said that "The new Lula government began more concerned with repressing protests and dissenting opinions than with presenting results. The unrestricted political allocation of ministries and state companies is back. All in favor of a mysterious "reconstruction" without any direction. It is not a good start." Flávio Bolsonaro, a senator and the eldest son of the former President, denied any relationship between the protestors and his father in leaked WhatsApp messages. Other Bolsonaro-aligned politicians, such as Federal Deputy Gustavo Gayer (PL), Governor of São Paulo Tarcísio de Freitas (Republicanos), Governor of Paraná Ratinho Júnior (PSD), Governor of Goiás Ronaldo Caiado (UNIÃO), Governor of Rio de Janeiro Cláudio Castro (PL), Governor of Minas Gerais Romeu Zema (NOVO), National President of the Republicanos Marcos Pereira and Senator-elect Hamilton Mourão (Republicanos) condemned the acts of vandalism, but the majority of the pro-Bolsonaro parties and politicians remained silent.

Senator Soraya Thronicke (UNIÃO) announced that her advisors had filed a request to open of a parliamentary commission of inquiry to investigate the protests. Senator Randolfe Rodrigues (REDE), Senator Jean Paul Prates (PT), Governor of Rio Grande do Sul Eduardo Leite (PSDB), Governor of Pará Helder Barbalho (MDB), former governor of Amapá and incumbent Minister of Integration and Regional Development Waldez Góes (PDT), National President of the Social Democratic Party Gilberto Kassab, as well as Federal Deputies Marcelo Freixo (PT), José Guimarães (PT) and André Janones (Avante) condemned the attacks, with some characterising them as domestic terrorism. Former presidential candidate Ciro Gomes (PDT) classified the acts as one of the greatest "crimes in the history of the Republic", and encouraged punishments in their "maximum rigor of the law" for those responsible.

Political parties such as the Social Democratic Party (PSD), Republicans and Cidadania announced the expulsion of people involved in the attacks, while members of the Liberal Party (PL), Progressistas (PP) and Podemos only wrote notes of repudiation, but did not apply any type of sanction; In the case of the latter, one of those involved was affiliated with the Social Christian Party (PSC), which had been incorporated into Podemos and is awaiting TSE approval.

== International ==
The attack was widely condemned by foreign governments and international organisations, especially in Latin America.

=== Americas ===
The Secretary General of the Organisation of American States (OAS), Luis Almagro, stated, "We condemn the attack on the institutions in Brasília, which constitutes a reprehensible action and a direct attack on democracy. These actions are inexcusable and fascist in nature." The OAS also convened a special meeting of its Permanent Council on 11 January to examine the incident. The Caribbean Community issued a communiqué "strongly condemning the violent invasion of governmental buildings in Brasília by a misinformed crowd who reject to accept the results of free, democratic and just elections" and called for the restoration of order.

Avatar of Joe Biden

Joe Biden
(@POTUS)
tweeted:

I condemn the assault on democracy and on the peaceful transfer of power in Brazil. Brazil's democratic institutions have our full support and the will of the Brazilian people must not be undermined. I look forward to continuing to work with @LulaOficial.

8 January 2023

The United States embassy in Brazil referred to the protests as anti-democratic and warned its citizens to avoid the rioting. President Joe Biden described the situation as "outrageous". U.S. Secretary of State Antony Blinken condemned the calls for a coup on Twitter, writing "We condemn the attacks on Brazil's Presidency, Congress, and Supreme Court today. Using violence to attack democratic institutions is always unacceptable. We join Lula in urging an immediate end to these actions". United States National Security Advisor Jake Sullivan also condemned the attack and said that the White House was following the situation. Many American observers also compared the attack to the attempted insurrection at the American capitol two years prior. Joaquin Castro and Alexandria Ocasio-Cortez, Democratic members of the United States House of Representatives, called on the U.S. government to deport Bolsonaro, who had been taking refuge in Orlando, Florida, in the days leading up to and after Lula's swearing-in, back to Brazil for inspiring the riots.

Latin American heads of state condemned the violence, such as President Gustavo Petro of Colombia, who called for an urgent meeting of the Organization of American States in the face of what he considers an attempted "coup" by fascism, or President Gabriel Boric of Chile, who condemned the rioting as a "vile attack" and announced his full support for the government. President of Cuba Miguel Díaz-Canel condemned the riots and expressed support and solidarity with Lula and his government. A similar statement was made by Mexican president Andrés Manuel López Obrador who described the events at Brasília as "reprehensible and antidemocratic" and described the protesters as being "motivated by oligarchs". President of Venezuela Nicolás Maduro rejected the violence by "Bolsonaro's neo-fascist groups" and expressed support for Lula. Alberto Fernández, the president of Argentina, described the storming as an "attempted coup d'état" and the Vice-President of Argentina, Cristina Kirchner, compared events in Brasília with the invasion of the US capitol in January 2021. Likewise, Guillermo Lasso, President of Ecuador, condemned the "disrespectful acts of vandalism perpetrated against democratic institutions in Brasília", and expressed his support for Lula's government. Other condemnations came from the Mexican Secretary of Foreign Affairs Marcelo Ebrard, the foreign minister of Argentina, and the foreign-affairs ministries of Ecuador, Bolivia and Uruguay.

=== Asia ===
Prime Minister of India Narendra Modi was "deeply concerned about the news of rioting and vandalism against the State institutions in Brasília". He said India extended its full support to the Brazilian authorities. The State of Palestine "condemned the recent acts of violence and terrorism in Brazil, calling them an assault on Brazilian democracy and its elected president, Luiz Inácio Lula da Silva. The state reaffirmed its support for the friendly Federative Republic of Brazil against any attempts to undermine its security or stability." Chinese Ministry of Foreign Affairs spokesman Wang Wenbin also condemned the attack and expressed support for Lula.

=== Europe ===
Avatar of Josep Borrell

Josep Borrell
(@JosepBorrellF)
tweeted:

Appalled by the acts of violence and illegal occupation of Brasilia's government quarter by violent extremists today.

Full support to Lula and his government, to Congress and to the Federal Supreme Court.

Brazilian democracy will prevail over violence and extremism.

8 January 2023

European Union Foreign Affairs High Representative Josep Borrell condemned the attack on the institutions. President of the European Council Charles Michel expressed support for President Lula and condemned "the assault on the democratic institutions of Brazil." The Iberian governments, who have historical and linguistic ties with Latin America, supported Lula. Prime Minister Pedro Sánchez of Spain emphatically condemned the assault and showed support to Lula and to the democratically-elected Brazilian institutions, while the government of Portugal condemned the violence and stated its supporting of Brazilian authorities in restoring order and stability.

President of France Emmanuel Macron declared that Lula "can count on France's unwavering support". The attack was also condemned by the British Foreign Secretary James Cleverly, Italian deputy prime minister and foreign affairs minister Antonio Tajani, Austrian foreign minister Alexander Schallenberg, German Chancellor Olaf Scholz and the Turkish Ministry of Foreign Affairs. Pope Francis condemned the insurrection attempt and expressed concern for the situation in Brazil. Dmitry Peskov, the press secretary for Russian President Vladimir Putin, declared support for Lula and said Moscow condemns "in the strongest terms" the actions of those who provoked the disorder.

=== Oceania ===
The Australian Government issued a statement condemning the attack on the Brazilian Congress, Supreme Court, and Presidential Palace. A Department of Foreign Affairs and Trade (DFAT) spokesperson described the attack as "unacceptable; democratic institutions and processes must be respected."

=== International organisations ===
United Nations Secretary-General António Guterres condemned the assault, stating, "I condemn today's assault on Brazil's democratic institutions. The will of the Brazilian people and the country's institutions must be respected. I have full confidence that it will be. Brazil is a great democratic country." The left-wing Progressive International also condemned the attack on Twitter. The right-wing Madrid Forum, although condemning the attack and any form of political violence, questioned the double standards of the Left, saying: "with what legitimacy can Gustavo Petro and Gabriel Boric complain about the violence in Brazil, if they were the main instigators of the vandalism protests in Colombia (2021) and Chile (2018)? (…) How can Pedro Sánchez show solidarity with Lula, if he currently governs alongside those who tried to besiege the Spanish Congress?"

=== Other ===
Left-wing figures and groups, such as the former Prime Minister of Greece Alexis Tsipras, former Leader of the British Labour Party Jeremy Corbyn, former President of the Workers' Party of Belgium Peter Mertens, founder of La France Insoumise Jean-Luc Mélenchon, as well as the Irish democratic socialist party Sinn Fein and the Socialist Party, a Swedish Trotskyist political organisation, expressed solidarity with Lula. American far-right political activist and former Trump administration's counselor to the president, Steve Bannon, praised those participating in the attack as "Brazilian freedom fighters".

Meta Platforms, which owns and operates Facebook and Instagram, confirmed on 9 January that they would be removing content supporting or promoting the invasion of Brazilian federal government buildings, roughly at the same time Google's YouTube confirmed it would also participate in such content takedowns. In addition, a representative from Telegram confirmed that the platform was working with the Brazilian government and fact checking groups to stop the spread of content promoting violence related to the events in Brazil.
