= Cabinet of Lula da Silva =

Cabinet of Lula da Silva may refer to:

- First cabinet of Lula da Silva
- Second cabinet of Lula da Silva
