= Gilberto Carvalho =

Brazilian philosopher and politician

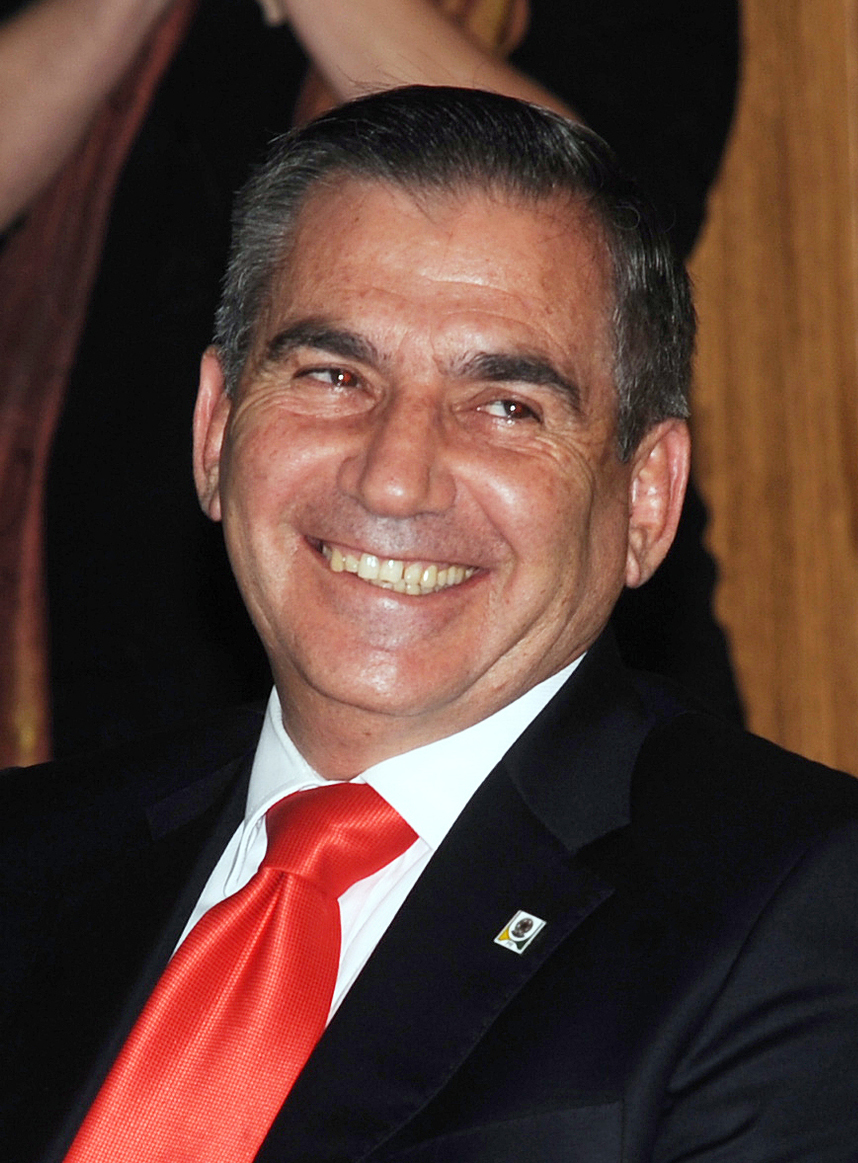
- Gilberto Carvalho in 2011.

Chief minister of General Secretariat of the Presidency of the Republic of Brazil
- In office 1 January 2011 – 1 January 2015
- President: Dilma Rousseff
- Preceded by: Luiz Dulci
- Succeeded by: Miguel Rossetto

Municipal Secretary of Communication of Santo André
- In office 1 January 1997 – 31 December 2000
- Succeeded by: Mario Maurici

Municipal Secretary of Government of Santo André
- In office 1 January 2001 – 14 January 2002
- Succeeded by: Mario Maurici

Personal details
- Born: January 21, 1951 (age 75) Londrina, Paraná, Brazil
- Party: Workers' Party (1980–present)
- Parents: Antônio Carvalho (father); Geracy Ballarotti Carvalho (mother)
- Education: Federal University of Paraná
- Occupation: philosopher politician
- Awards: Order of Military Merit (2003)

Gilberto Carvalho (January 21, 1951) is a Brazilian philosopher and politician affiliated with the Workers’ Party (PT). He served as Chief Minister of the General Secretariat of the Presidency of the Republic of Brazil between 2011 and 2015, during Dilma Rousseff presidency.

== Biography ==
=== First years and education ===
Gilberto Carvalho was born in Londrina, a city in the interior of Paraná, on January 21, 1951. At the age of 11, he decided to become a priest and entered a seminary without consulting his parents. He remained active in the Catholic Church, preparing to become a priest, and in 1968, he received his novice cassock. The following year, he moved from the interior of Paraná to Curitiba, the state capital, where he enrolled in the philosophy program at the Federal University of Paraná (UFPR) and later graduated. During his years at the university, he distanced himself from the seminary and joined the student movement opposing the dictatorship. While still in Curitiba, he began studying theology at the Pontifical Catholic University of Paraná (PUCPR), but did not complete the program.

=== The Church, Labor Unions, and a Political Career ===
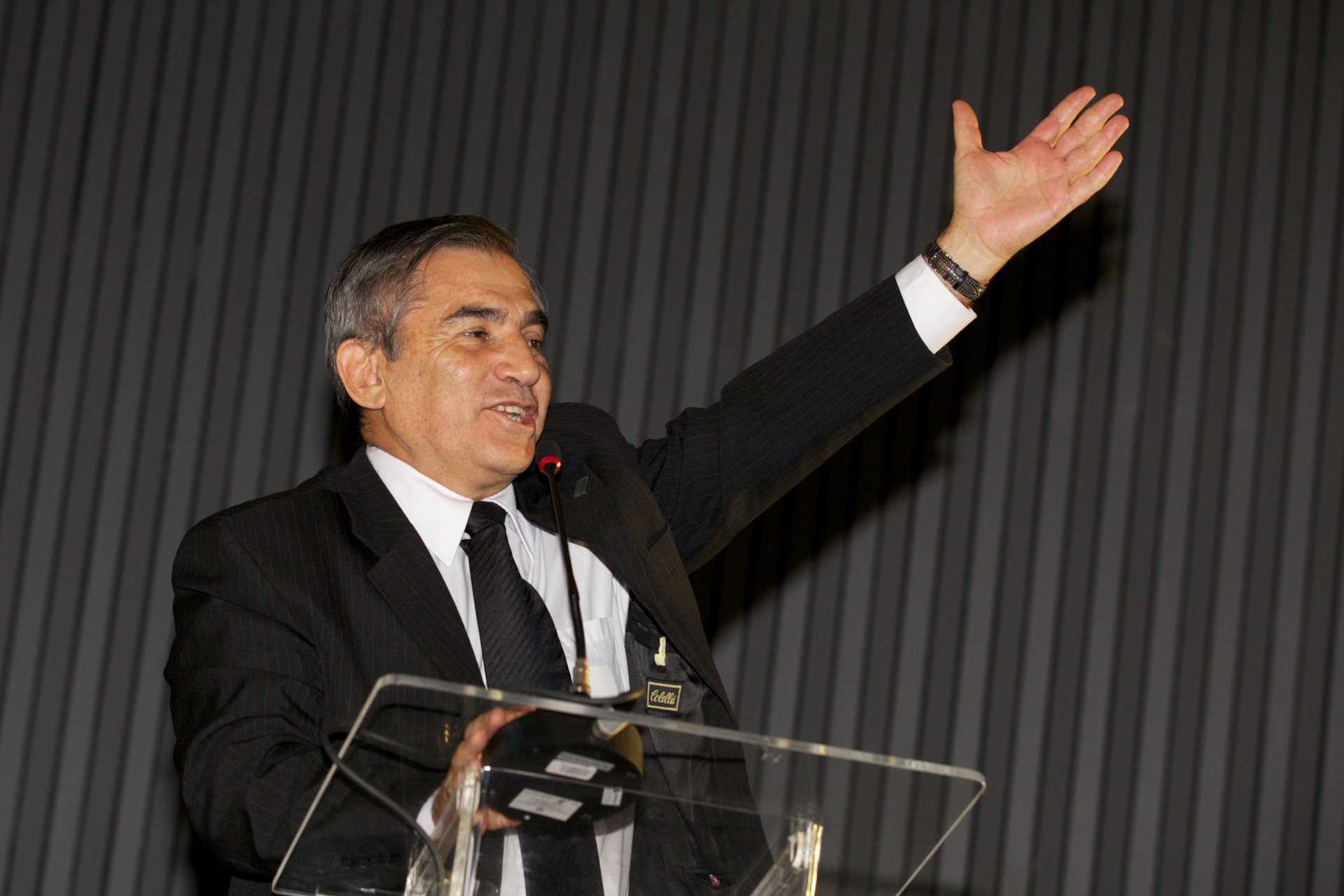
Gilberto Carvalho in 2012.

When he was twenty-four, he came across a copy of the French book L’Ânesse de Balaam dans une Favelle Brésilienne by Joseph Bouchaud and Frédy Kunz, which recounts the experiences of the latter, a priest and resident of a favela in Crateús, Ceará. Inspired by the story of the “worker priests” and influenced by liberation theology, he translated the book into Portuguese for Loyola, a Brazilian Catholic publishing house based in São Paulo.

In 1975, after dropping out of the theology program at PUCPR, he moved with two other seminarians to a favela in Vila Belém, São Paulo, to work in a factory in accordance with the principles of the workers’ ministry. Carvalho worked at a plastics factory in Curitiba and later at a metalworking plant in São Paulo. He joined the labor movement and was an activist with the Catholic Church’s Basic Ecclesial Communities. In the 1970's final years, he became involved in the ABC metalworkers’ strike, where he met Luiz Inácio Lula da Silva, the strike group’s main union and political leader. As he grew closer to Lula and the labor movement, he helped found the Workers’ Party (PT) in 1980. In 1981, at the recommendation of the Pastoral Operária, he traveled to Europe to learn about labor union practices and strengthen ties with the Pastoral. Two years later, in 1983, he was present at the founding of the Central Única dos Trabalhadores (CUT), which took place in São Bernardo do Campo, in the Greater São Paulo, and became one of the leading trade union movements in the country.

In 1986, after helping to establish the PT in Paraná, he ran for federal deputy representing the state in that year’s election. In the election, he received 25,077 votes, making him the PT’s second-highest vote-getter in the election, trailing only agronomist Claus Magno Germer. In that election, the PT did not win any seats in the Federal Chamber of Deputies in Paraná, as the party failed to meet the electoral threshold. After the defeat in the 1990s, he moved to Nova Iguaçu, in the Baixada Fluminense region of Rio de Janeiro, and began leading the Cajamar Institute, a training program for political leaders that Lula used to attend.

In the 1994 presidential election, Carvalho was part of the campaign team for Luís Inácio Lula da Silva’s bid for the presidency, working on mobilization efforts in the areas of culture and communications. The election was decided in the first round following the victory of Fernando Henrique Cardoso (PSDB). From 1995 to 1997, he served as communications secretary for the PT, always aligning himself with the majority faction, Articulação de Esquerda, the party’s most left-wing faction. In February 1997, he was appointed communications secretary of São Bernardo do Campo by Mayor Celso Daniel. Following the mayor's re-election in January 2001, Carvalho became Secretary of the Cabinet, a position he held until Daniel’s murder in January 2002.

In the 2002 presidential election, he became Lula’s chief campaign advisor. In the election, Lula defeated the frontrunner, José Serra (PSDB), in the runoff. During Lula’s eight-year presidency, he served as Chief of Staff. Known for his loyalty and close relationship with President Luiz Inácio Lula da Silva, as well as for serving as his advisor, he was often referred to as “the new Golbery” or “the new Chalaça,” allusions to the eras of President Ernesto Geisel and Emperor Pedro I of Brazil. The comparisons were made because, in the past, these figures were regarded as strongmen in the governments they served. In 2003, he was awarded the Order of Military Merit by Lula, with the rank of Special Commander.

During Dilma Rousseff’s 2009 presidential campaign, he was one of the key figures working to build ties between Lula and Catholic movements in an effort to secure the Catholic vote. Following Dilma’s victory, he was appointed at the start of her administration as Chief minister of the General Secretariat of the Presidency of the Republic of Brazil between 2011 and 2015. During his administration, several ministers resigned or were removed from office due to corruption allegations, including prominent figures from the Workers’ Party (PT) such as Antonio Palocci (Chief of Staff), Luiz Sérgio (Institutional Relations), Alfredo Nascimento (Transportation), Nelson Jobim (Defense), Wagner Rossi (Agriculture), Pedro Novais (Tourism), Orlando Silva (Sports), and Carlos Lupi (Labor). Also during his tenure in Dilma’s first administration, the government faced the June 2013 protests, during which Carvalho was seen as a legitimate figure in the demonstrations. Despite the protests, he ranked 40th on the list of “Brazil’s 60 Most Powerful People” published by the website Último Segundo, part of the Intenert Group (iG), in 2013. After working on Dilma’s successful campaign against Aécio Neves in the 2014 election, he was replaced by Miguel Rossetto.

After leaving the government, he became chairman of the board of directors of the Industrial Social Services (Sesi). Between 2015 and 2016, Gilberto Carvalho played a key role in trying to convince various sectors to support the government’s continued tenure. At a political rally on May 1, 2016, he stated that while he acknowledged the PT’s mistakes, they did not justify impeachment. In June 2016, his dismissal from his position at Sesi was published in the Official Gazette (DOU) by the government of Michel Temer (PMDB).

In February 2023, during Lula’s third term, he became national secretary for the popular and solidarity economy, assigned to the Ministry of Labour, headed by Luiz Marinho (PT). In October 2023, he took a brief leave of absence from his position to recover from pneumonia. He asked to step down in April 2026.

== Legal issues ==
=== Celso Daniel ===
Celso Daniel’s brothers accused Gilberto Carvalho of participating in an alleged kickback scheme in the ABC Paulista region. According to Celso’s brothers, Carvalho even confessed that on one occasion he drove his black Chevrolet Corsa carrying a suitcase containing 1.2 million reais to the then-president of the PT, José Dirceu. Carvalho rejected the accusations when he faced Celso Daniel’s brothers during the Bingo Parliamentary Inquiry (CPI dos Bingos) in late 2005. Sociologist Ivone Santana, who was not only Celso Daniel’s girlfriend at the time of the murder but also the mother of his only daughter, never corroborated the account given by her brothers-in-law regarding Celso’s murder, nor did she confirm the accusations against Dirceu and Carvalho, since her brothers-in-law were not closely involved in the day-to-day management of Celso’s affairs.

=== FARC ===
In June 2008, his name, along with those of other members of the federal government, was mentioned by a Colombian media outlet, which was reporting on stories from newspaper Folha de S.Paulo, following the seizure of the laptop belonging to Raúl Reyes, the second-in-command of the Revolutionary Armed Forces of Colombia (FARC) guerrilla group, who had been killed by the Colombian government in March 2008. Upon learning of the messages that mentioned members of the federal government, then-Defense Minister Nelson Jobim approached President Lula to inform him of their existence. The President then forwarded the material to Interpol and Brazilian Intelligence Agency (ABIN) for analysis and condemned the kidnappings carried out by the Colombian guerrilla group. Gilberto Carvalho stated that he had never had contact with or exchanged electronic messages with Olivério Medina, limiting himself to interceding to improve the conditions of the prison where he was being held.

=== Zelotes Operation ===
At the center of the Federal Police operation known as Zelotes in 2015, he was accused of making secret deals with lobbyists seeking tax benefits during the Lula administration. On June 21, 2021, Carvalho was acquitted, along with former President Lula and five other defendants, of the charges brought by the Public Prosecutor’s Office (MPF).

== Personal life ==
He is Catholic. He has two sisters, Marilda Carvalho Dias and Márcia Lopes; the latter served as Minister of Social Development and the Fight Against Hunger during the final nine months of Lula’s administration and, since March 2025, has held the position of Minister for Women in Brazil during Lula’s third term. He is a fan of SE Palmeiras, a soccer team from São Paulo, and in 2014 he presented Pope Francis with a team jersey.

He was married to Maria do Carmo Alves de Albuquerque, with whom he had three children. From his second marriage, to Floripis, he had two adopted daughters.
