= Campello =

Campello may refer to:

- El Campello, Costa Blanca, Spain
- Campello, Switzerland in the canton of Ticino
- Campello sul Clitunno, province of Perugia, Italy
- Campello (MBTA station), a railway station in Massachusetts, in the Campello section of the city of Brockton

== People with the surname ==
- F. Lennox Campello (born 1956), American artist, art critic and author
- Tereza Campello (born 1962), Brazilian economist
