= Manoel Dias =

Brazilian politician (1938–2026)

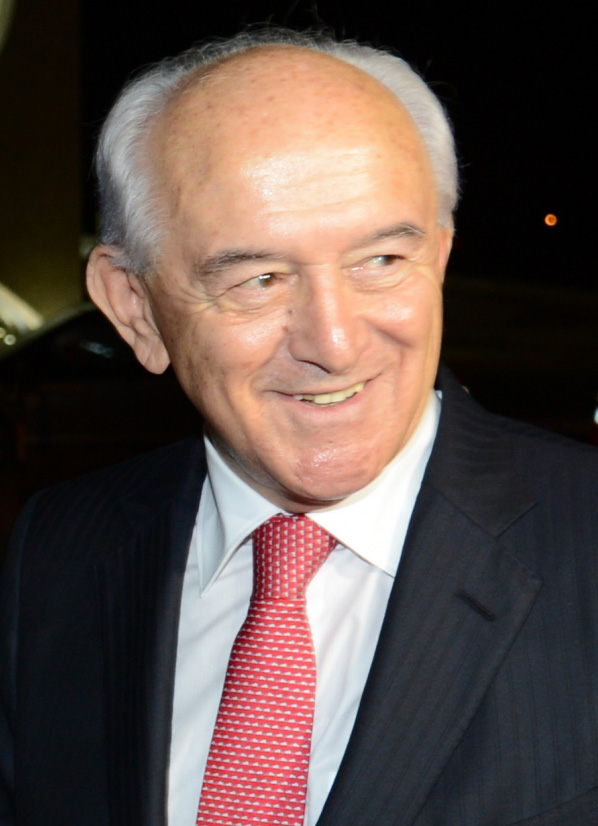

Minister of Labor and Employment
- In office 15 March 2013 – 2 October 2015
- Preceded by: Brizola Neto
- Succeeded by: Miguel Rossetto

State Deputy of Santa Catarina
- In office 1967–1969

Councilman of Içara
- In office 1962–1964

Personal details
- Born: 13 August 1938 Criciúma, Santa Catarina, Brazil
- Died: 22 August 2026 (aged 88) Florianópolis, Santa Catarina, Brazil
- Party: PTB (1962–1965); MDB (1966–1979); PDT (1979–2026)
- Education: Federal University of Santa Catarina

Manoel Dias (13 August 1938 – 22 August 2026) was a Brazilian lawyer and politician, who was affiliated with the Democratic Labour Party (PDT), a party he helped to establish. He was the Brazilian Minister of Labour and Employment from 2013 to 2015.

== Life and career ==
Dias was born in Criciúma, Santa Catarina on 13 August 1938, the son of Anselmo Fortunato Dias and Cândida Borges Dias.

He began his public life in the 1960s, when he was a leader in student unions. During this period, Dias graduated with a law degree from the Federal University of Santa Catarina, and went on to practice law in Criciúma. He was elected as a city councilor in the city of Içara in 1962 as a member of the Brazilian Labour Party (PTB). His mandate, however, was revoked after the 1964 Brazilian coup d'état. He was forcibly imprisoned for 11 months.

In 1965, Dias participated in the founding of the Brazilian Democratic Movement's branch in Santa Catarina. He later became a state deputy in the Legislative Assembly of Santa Catarina from 1967 to 1971. With the decreeing of Institutional Act Number Five, in 1969, he was imprisoned again, with his political rights suspended for 10 years. After receiving amnesty in 1979, he moved to Florianópolis in an effort to recreate the PTB.

After the PTB was eventually reregistered as a political entity by Ivete Vargas, he participated in the founding of the PDT in the beginning of the 1980s, jointly with Leonel Brizola and other leaders. He was a candidate for state deputy in 1982, for governor in 2006 and for vice-governor in 2010, with Ângela Amin leading the ticket, but was not elected to any post.

Dias was later the secretary-general of the PDT, the president of the state branch in Santa Catarina, and was also president of their think tank, the Fundação Leonel Brizola-Alberto Pasqualini. During the 1990s, he participated in the Brizola government in Rio de Janeiro during his time as governor, being the director of the Banco do Estado do Rio de Janeiro (Banerj).

=== Minister of Labour and Employment ===
Dias became the Minister of Labour and Employment on 15 March 2013.

On 31 December 2014, it was announced he would remain as minister in the second term of the Dilma Rousseff government. During her second mandate, he was tasked with dealing with the effects of the 2014 Brazilian economic crisis. He claimed that the increases in unemployment could be reverted by the second semester in 2015 through gains in the automobile industry and subsequently exporting cars to Mexico and other countries in Latin America, as well as through civil construction. He alleged that investments by the provisional government for the construction of public housing units would cost 84 billion real, which would generate jobs.

=== Death ===
Dias died in Florianópolis on 22 August 2026, at the age of 88.

== Bibliography ==
- Piazza, Walter, Dicionário Político Catarinense. Florianópolis : Legislative Assembly of the State of Santa Catarina, 1985.
- TRE/SC, Declaração candidatura 2010. Florianópolis: Tribunal Regional Eleitoral de Santa Catarina, 2010.
