= Paulo Teixeira (politician) =

Brazilian politician, lawyer, and professor (born 1961)

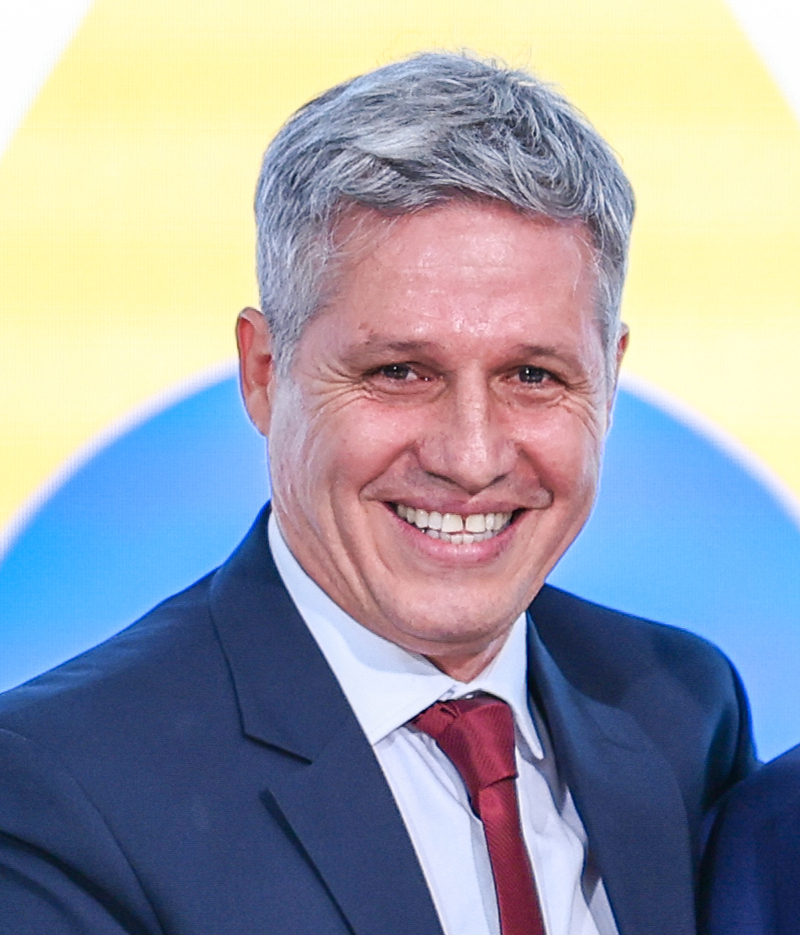
- Teixeira in 2023

Minister of Agrarian Development
- In office 1 January 2023 – 31 March 2026
- President: Luiz Inácio Lula da Silva
- Preceded by: Patrus Ananias (in 2015; office re-established)
- Succeeded by: Fernanda Machiaveli

Federal Deputy for São Paulo
- Incumbent
- Assumed office 1 February 2007

Vereador for São Paulo
- In office 1 January 2005 – 31 January 2007

State Deputy for São Paulo
- In office 15 March 1995 – 31 December 2000

Personal details
- Born: Luiz Paulo Teixeira Ferreira; 6 May 1961 (age 65) Águas da Prata, SP, Brazil
- Party: PT
- Spouse: Alice Mieko Yamaguchi

Luiz Paulo Teixeira Ferreira (born 6 May 1961), known as Paulo Teixeira, a Brazilian politician, lawyer, and professor who belongs to the Partido dos Trabalhadores (PT, or Workers’ Party). He is currently a federal deputy in the lower house of the Brazilian Parliament, where he served as PT party leader in 2011

== Early life and education ==
Teixeira, who is a brother of State Representative Luiz Fernando Teixeira, received a Master of Science in Constitutional Law from the University of São Paulo.

== Career ==
Teixeira was a São Paulo state deputy twice, in 1994-1995 and 1998–2000. From 2001 to 2004 he served as Municipal Secretary of Habitation and Human Development in the municipality of São Paulo; from 2003 to 2004 he was Chief Executive Officer of the Metropolitan Housing Company of São Paulo (COHAB); and from 2004 to 2007 he was a city councilman in São Paulo. He was elected a federal deputy in 2006, taking office in 2007, and was re-elected to Parliament in 2010.

He was a candidate for president of PT in 2013. He supports political reform and was critical of PT's then alliance with the Brazilian Democratic Movement Party (PMDB).

He was supportive of ex-president Lula when he was questioned and tried in connection with the scandal known as Operation Car Wash.

In a 2015 op-ed for O Globo, Teixeira praised then president Dilma Rousseff for vetoing corporate financing of election campaigns and political parties, saying that by doing so she had shown “deep respect for democracy.”
