= Pepe Vargas =

Brazilian politician

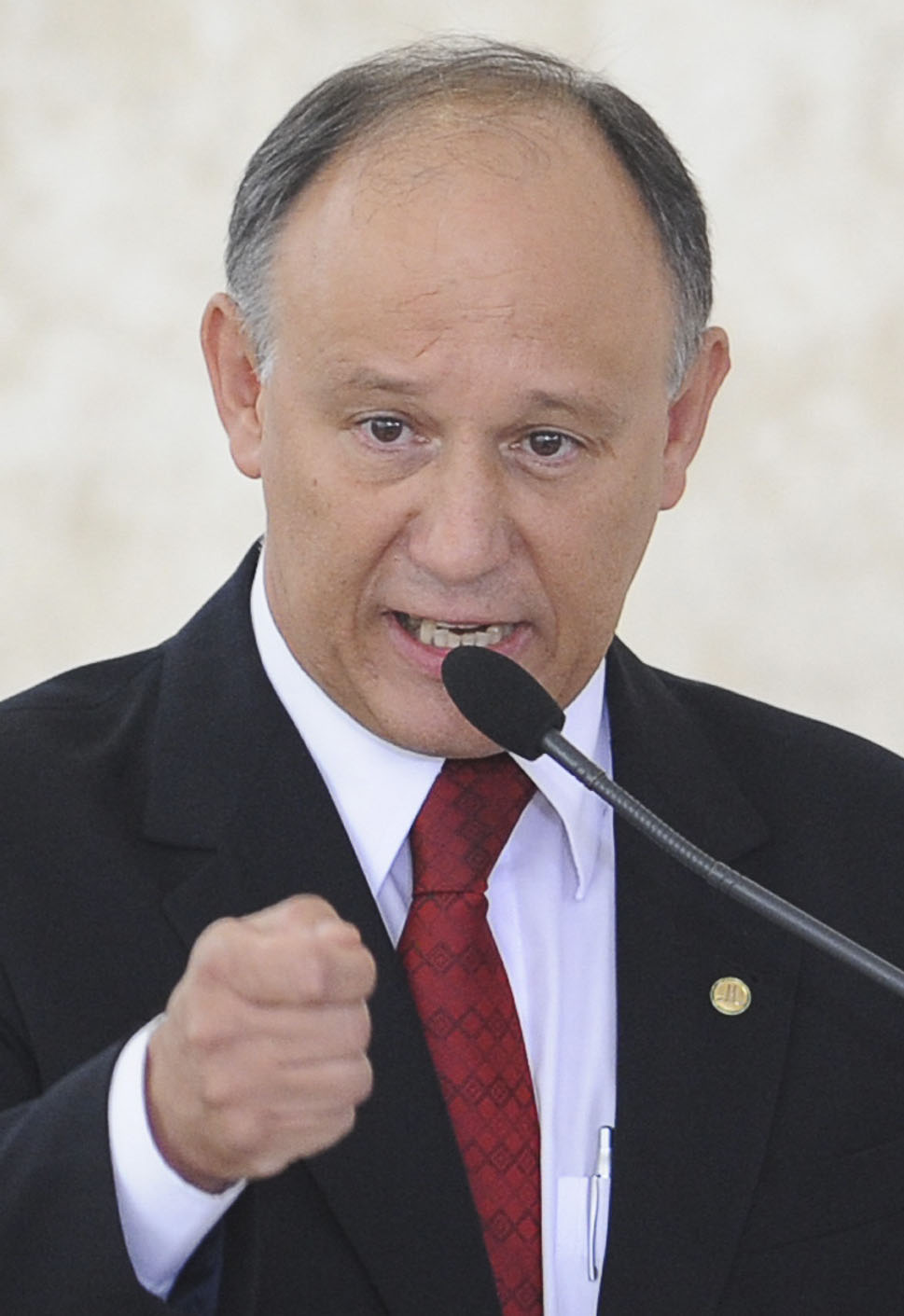

State Deputy of Rio Grande do Sul
- Incumbent
- Assumed office 1 February 2019
- In office 1 January 1995 – 7 April 1996

Federal Deputy of Rio Grande do Sul
- In office 1 February 2007 – 1 February 2019

Secretary of Institutional Affairs
- In office 1 January 2015 – 7 April 2015
- Preceded by: Ricardo Berzoini
- Succeeded by: Alexandre Padilha (2023)

Minister of Human Rights and Citizenship
- In office 16 April 2015 – 2 October 2015
- Preceded by: Ideli Salvatti
- Succeeded by: Nilma Lino Gomes (as Minister of Women, Racial Equality and Human Rights)

Minister of Agrarian Development
- In office 14 March 2012 – 17 March 2014
- Preceded by: Afonso Florence
- Succeeded by: Miguel Rossetto

Mayor of Caxias do Sul
- In office 1 January 1997 – 1 January 2005
- Preceded by: Mário David Vanin
- Succeeded by: José Ivo Sartori

Councilman of Caxias do Sul
- In office 1 January 1989 – 1 January 1993

Personal details
- Born: Gilberto José Spier Vargas; 29 October 1958 (age 67) Nova Petrópolis, Rio Grande do Sul, Brazil
- Party: PT (1981–present)
- Education: University of Caxias do Sul

Gilberto José Spier Vargas, better known as Pepe Vargas (born 29 October 1958) is a Brazilian doctor and politician. He served as the mayor of Caxias do Sul from 1997 to 2005, as well as a state and federal deputy in the state of Rio Grande do Sul. During the Dilma Rousseff administration, he served in various ministerial roles.

== Political career ==
=== Elected office ===
In 1996, Vargas was elected to become the mayor of the city of Caxias do Sul. He advanced from the first round with more than 80,000 votes, or 48.68%, and faced the second place candidate from the PMDB, Germano Rigotto, who received 77,079 votes. In the second round, Vargas obtained 51.13% and won the election.

Four years later, he would go on to run for reelection against José Ivo Sartori, also of the PMDB. Vargas came in first in the first round again with 48.15% of the vote (94,923), against Sartori's 43.11% (84,989). Kalil Sehbe Neto, of the PDT, came in third with 8.72% (17,194). Weeks after, in a tight race, Vargas won against Sartori, becoming the first mayor in Caxias do Sul's history to be reelected.

Vargas became the minister of Agrarian Development, at the invite of president Dilma Rousseff, on 14 March 2012, substituting Afonso Florence. He left the post on 17 March 2014 during a period of ministerial reforms.

Vargas was a federal deputy from 2007 to 2019. He voted against the admission of the request for the impeachment of Dilma Rousseff on 17 April 2016.

In 2020, he once again ran to become the mayor of Caxias do Sul as a member of the PT. He reached the second round, but only obtained 40.43% of the vote and was defeated by the PSDB candidate, Adiló Didomênico, who received almost 60% of the vote.

=== Ministerial posts ===
On 29 December 2014, Vargas was announced to become the Secretary of Institutional Affairs. On 7 April 2015, the duties of the office were transferred to the vice president and the secretariat was disbanded.

On 16 April 2015, soon after leaving the secretariat, he became the Minister of Human Rights and Citizenship.
