= Gleisi Hoffmann =

Brazilian lawyer and politician (born 1965)

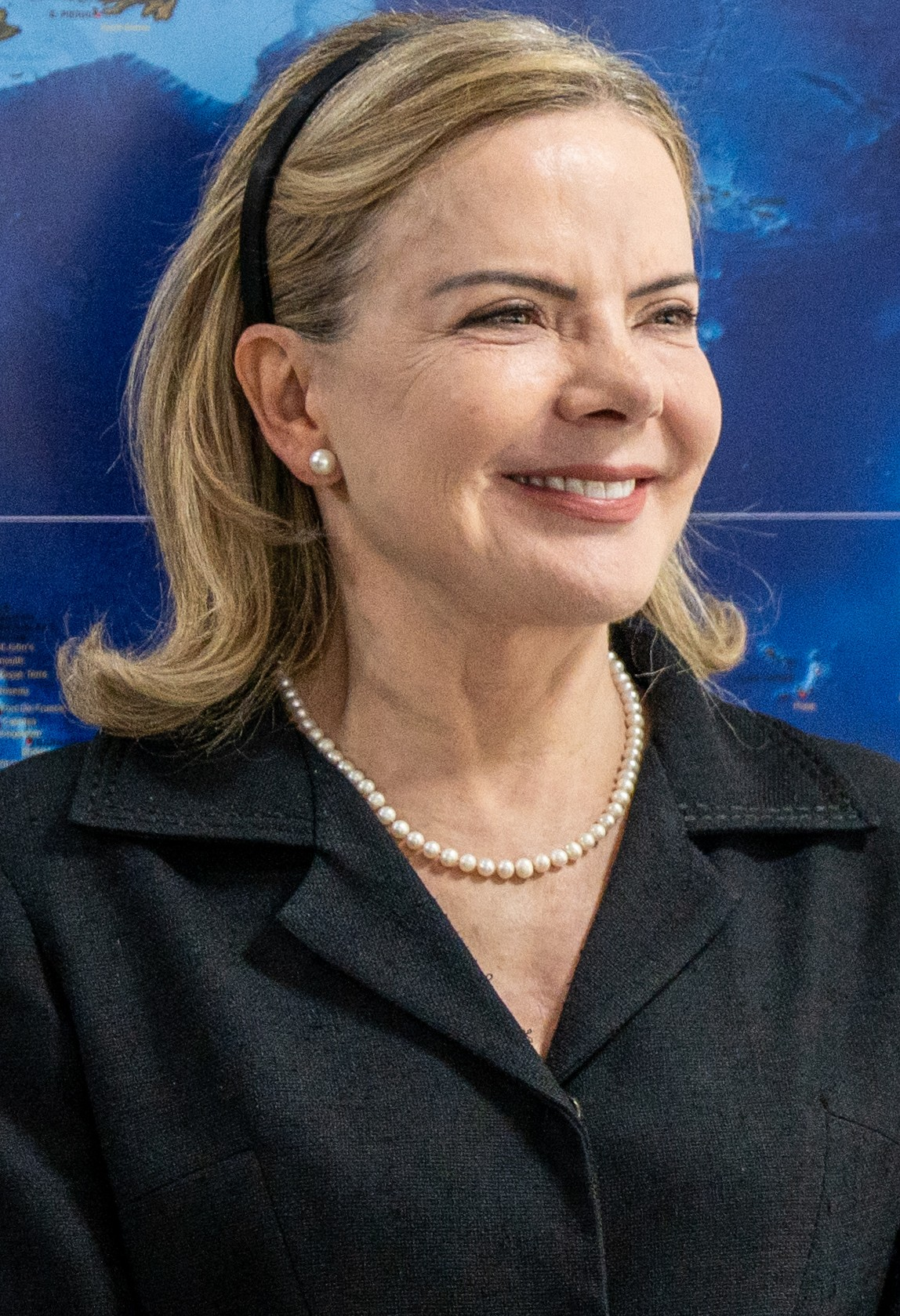
- Gleisi in 2025

Secretary of Institutional Affairs
- In office 10 March 2025 – 2 April 2026
- President: Luiz Inácio Lula da Silva
- Preceded by: Alexandre Padilha
- Succeeded by: José Guimarães

Federal Deputy
- Incumbent
- Assumed office 1 February 2019
- Constituency: Paraná

National President of the Workers' Party
- In office 3 June 2017 – 7 March 2025
- Preceded by: Rui Falcão
- Succeeded by: Humberto Costa (interim)

Senator for Paraná
- In office 1 February 2011 – 1 February 2019

Chief of Staff of the Presidency
- In office 8 June 2011 – 2 February 2014
- President: Dilma Rousseff
- Preceded by: Antonio Palocci
- Succeeded by: Aloizio Mercadante

Personal details
- Born: 6 September 1965 (age 61) Curitiba, Paraná, Brazil
- Party: PT (1989–present)
- Spouse: Paulo Bernardo (m. 1998; div. 2019)
- Domestic partner: Lindbergh Farias (2020–present)
- Children: 2
- Education: Curitiba Faculty of Law

Gleisi Helena Hoffmann ([ˈɡlejzj ɛˈlẽnɐ ˈʁɔfmɐ̃]; born 6 September 1965) is a Brazilian lawyer and a member of the Chamber of Deputies of Brazil, representing the State of Paraná. She served as the Chief Minister of the Secretariat of Institutional Relations of the Government of President Luiz Inácio Lula da Silva from 2025 to 2026, and as the Chief of Staff of the Government of President Dilma Rousseff from 2011 to 2014. In 2017, she was elected a Senator for Paraná before becoming National President of the Workers' Party, a position she has held for nine years.

== Biography ==
Gleisi Hoffmann began her involvement in politics in the student movement during her youth, becoming a Workers' Party' member in 1989. She graduated in law in the Centro Universitário Curitiba (Faculdade de Direito de Curitiba).

Known for her public management skills, Hoffmann has served as state secretary in Mato Grosso do Sul and as municipal secretary in the city of Londrina.

She was a member of Luiz Inácio Lula da Silva's presidential transition team in 2002, and served as the financial director at the Itaipu Binacional hydroelectric dam from 2003 to 2006.

She ran for the Federal Senate of Brazil in 2006 and for the office of mayor of Curitiba in 2008, losing both elections. At the time, she was the president of PT in the state of Paraná.

In October 2010, Hoffmann was elected to the Senate, receiving over 3.1 million votes, the most voted senator from the state of Paraná and the first woman to hold the office. After four months in office, she was appointed Chief of Staff, the highest-ranking member of Brazil's Executive Office, by President Dilma Rousseff. During this period, the foundation of the Brazilian Hospital Services Company (EBSERH), moving from which it suffered criticism from the Unified Socialist Workers’ Party, accusing the indirect management of hospitals as a form of privatization, denouncing the outsourcing and precariousness of the SUS, questioning the effectiveness and target audience of Gleisi Hoffmann’s feminist rhetoric.

In March 2025, Hoffman resigned as president of the Workers Party upon her appointment as Secretary of Institutional Affairs in the second Lula presidency.

Hoffmann was accused of receiving R$1.000.000,00 of embezzlement money from Petrobras in her campaign to the Senate in 2010. In 2018, Hoffmann was cleared of charges in the Supreme Court.

Gleisi was married to the ex-Communications Minister Paulo Bernardo; they divorced in 2019. They have two children.

== Electoral history ==
Year	Election	Party	Office	Coalition	Partners	Party	Votes	Percent	Result
2006	State Election of Paraná	PT	Senator	United Paraná (PT, PL, PCdoB, PRB, PAN, PHS)	Nereu Faustino	PCdoB	2,299,088	45.14%	Not elected
2006	State Election of Paraná	PT	Senator	United Paraná (PT, PL, PCdoB, PRB, PAN, PHS)	Shinji Gohara	PHS	2,299,088	45.14%	Not elected
2008	Municipal Election of Curitiba	PT	Mayor	Curitiba for All (PT, PSC, PMN, PRB, PHS, PTC)	Borges dos Reis	PSC	183,027	18.17%	Not elected
2010	State Elections of Paraná	PT	Senator	The Union Makes a New Tomorrow (PDT, PMDB, PT, PSC, PCdoB, PTdoB)	Sérgio Souza	MDB	3,196,468	29.50%	Elected
2010	State Elections of Paraná	PT	Senator	The Union Makes a New Tomorrow (PDT, PMDB, PT, PSC, PCdoB, PTdoB)	Pedro Tonelli	PCdoB	3,196,468	29.50%	Elected
2014	State Elections of Paraná	PT	Governor	Paraná Looking Forward (PT, PDT, PCdoB, PRB, PTN)	Haroldo Ferreira	PDT	881,857	14.87%	Not elected
2018	State Elections of Paraná	PT	Federal Deputy	—N/a			212,513	3.71%	Elected
2022	State Elections of Paraná	PT	Federal Deputy	—N/a			261,247	4.26%	Elected
2026	State Elections of Paraná	PT	Senator	Paraná For All; PDT, PT, PCdoB, PV, PSOL, REDE, PRD, Solidariedade)	Assis Gurgacz Neto	PDT	1,542,636	13.35%	Not elected
2026	State Elections of Paraná	PT	Senator	Paraná For All; PDT, PT, PCdoB, PV, PSOL, REDE, PRD, Solidariedade)	Aldair Rizzi	REDE	1,542,636	13.35%	Not elected

Political offices
Preceded by Antonio Palocci	Chief of Staff of the Presidency; 2011–2014	Succeeded by Aloizio Mercadante
Preceded by Alexandre Padilha	Secretary of Institutional Affairs; 2025–present	Incumbent
Party political offices
Preceded by Rui Falcão	National President of the Workers' Party; 2017–2025	Succeeded by Humberto Costa (interim)
