= Marcelo Castro =

Brazilian politician (born 1950)

Senator for Piauí
- Incumbent
- Assumed office 1 February 2019

Minister of Health
- In office 1 October 2015 – 17 February 2016
- President: Dilma Rousseff
- Preceded by: Arthur Chioro
- Succeeded by: Agenor Álvares

Federal Deputy from Piauí
- In office 1 February 1999 – 1 February 2019

State Deputy of Piauí
- In office 1 February 1983 – 1 February 1995

Personal details
- Born: Marcelo Costa e Castro; 9 June 1950 (age 76) São Raimundo Nonato, Piauí, Brazil
- Party: MDB (since 1980)
- Other political affiliations: ARENA (1978–1979)
- Education: Federal University of Piauí (M.B.)
- Profession: Medic

Marcelo Costa e Castro (born 9 June 1950) is a Brazilian politician who is a congressman in the Federal Senate and former Minister of Heath.

Political offices
Preceded by Arthur Chioro	Minister of Health; 2015–16	Succeeded by Agenor Álvares
