= Afonso Florence =

Brazilian politician (born 1960)

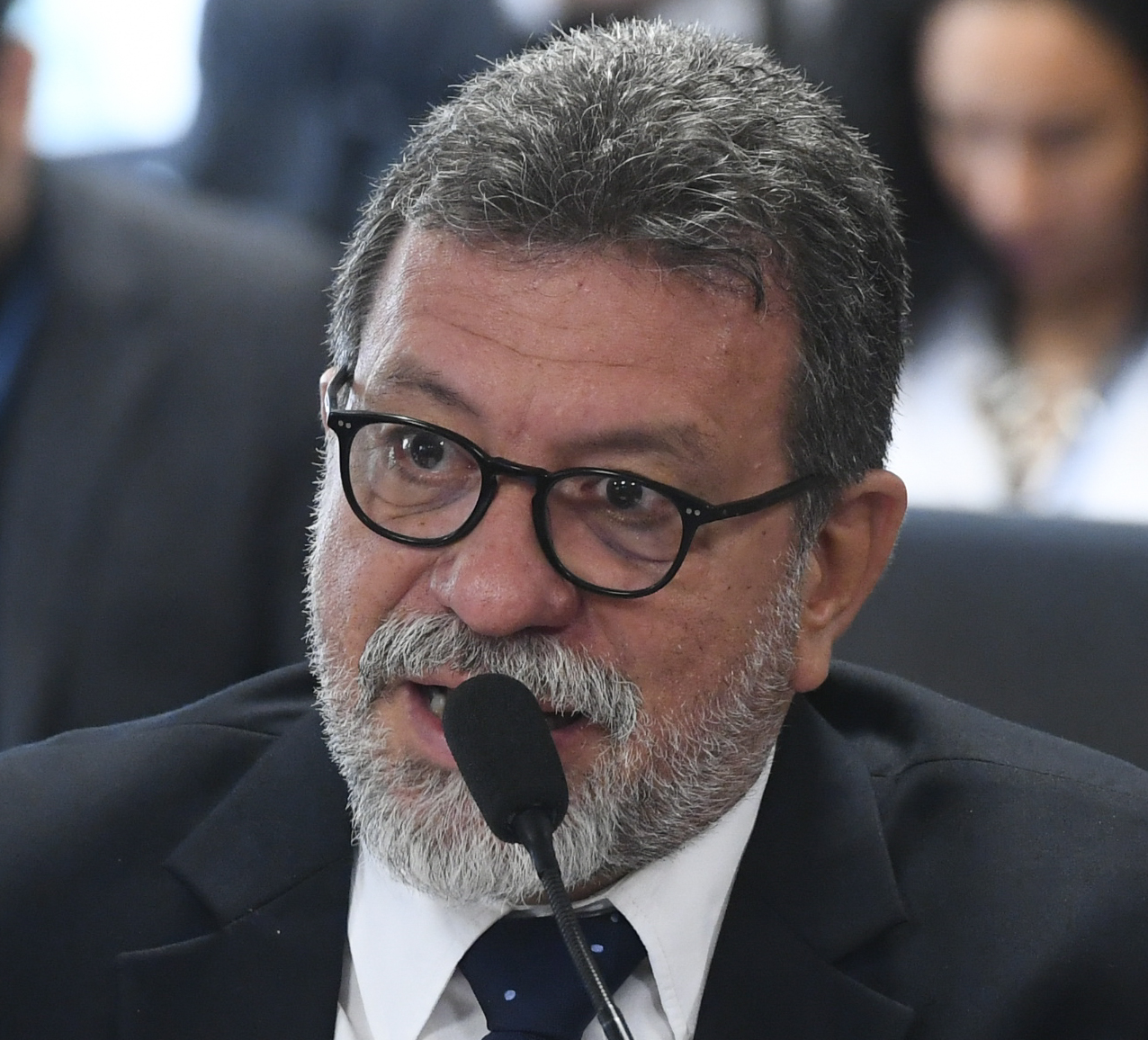
- Florence in 2020

Member of the Chamber of Deputies
- Incumbent
- Assumed office 1 February 2011
- Constituency: Bahia

Minister of Agrarian Development
- In office 1 January 2011 – 14 March 2012
- President: Dilma Rousseff
- Preceded by: Guilherme Cassel
- Succeeded by: Pepe Vargas

Personal details
- Born: Afonso Bandeira Florence; 15 October 1960 (age 66) Salvador, Bahia, Brazil
- Party: PT (since 2010)
- Profession: Teacher

Afonso Bandeira Florence (born 15 October 1960) is a Brazilian politician serving as a member of the Chamber of Deputies since 2011. From 2011 to 2012, he served as minister of agrarian development.
