= Tereza Campello =

Brazilian economist

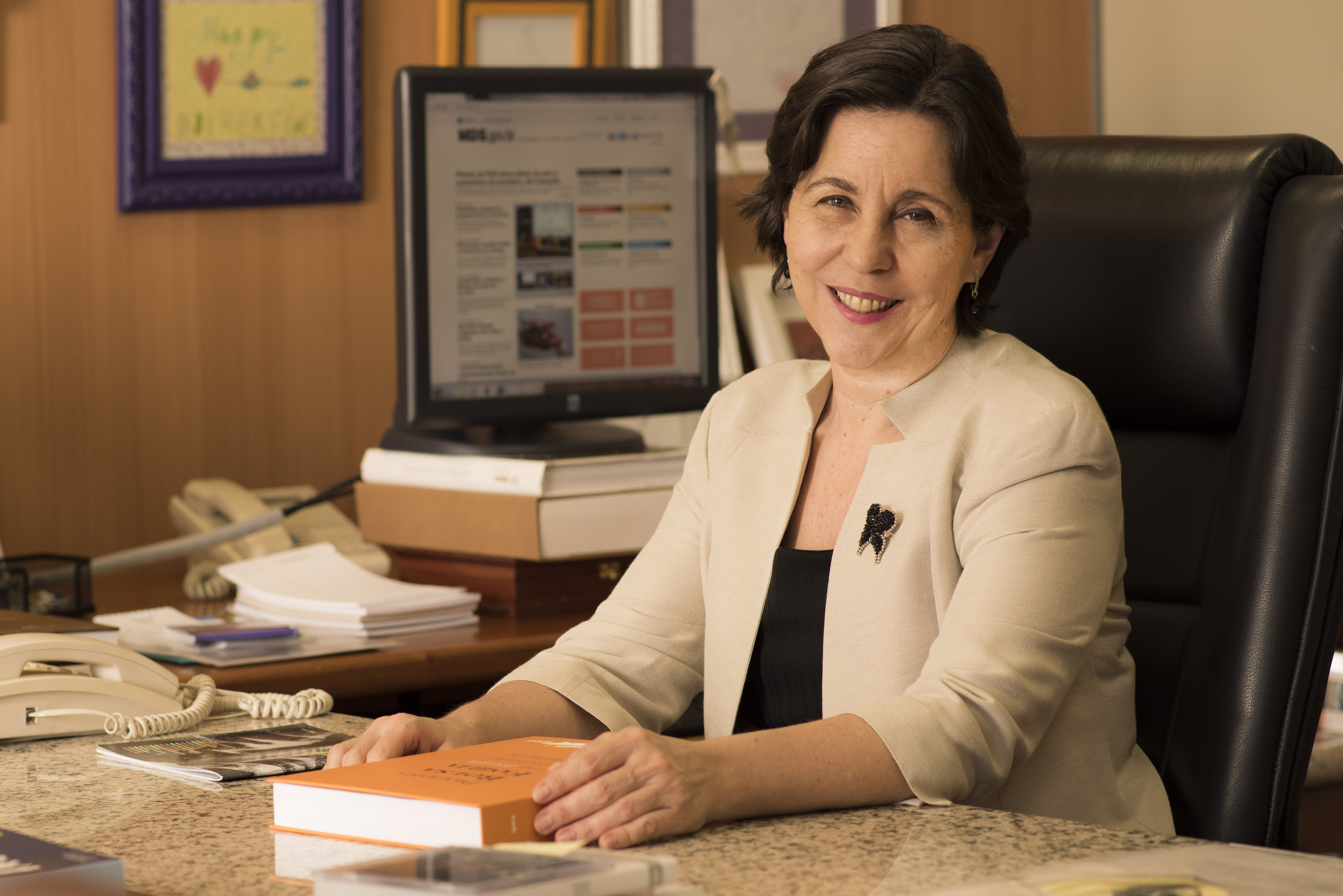

Minister of Social Development and Fight against Hunger
- In office 1 January 2011 – May 12, 2016
- President: Dilma Rousseff
- Preceded by: Márcia Lopes
- Succeeded by: Osmar Terra

Personal details
- Born: August 12, 1962 (age 64) Descalvado, São Paulo, Brazil
- Party: PT

Tereza Helena Gabrielli Barreto Campello (born August 12, 1962) is a Brazilian economist graduated from the Federal University of Uberlândia and Doctor in Public Health from FioCruz. She was the minister of Social Development and Fight against Hunger during the government of President Dilma Rousseff. She is international consultant on social development and social protection, visiting fellow in the Future Food Beacon of Excellence at University of Nottingham (UK) University of Nottingham (UK) and professor and research associate at the Oswaldo Cruz Foundation (FIOCRUZ, Brazil)

== Biography ==
Campello was born in Descalvado, in the state of São Paulo. Her career in public administration began in Rio Grande do Sul, where she participated as coordinated the Office of Planning and Participatory Budgeting of the capital in the governments of Olivio Dutra and Tarso Genro, former mayors of Porto Alegre. She was Assistant Secretary General of the State Secretariat of Rio Grande do Sul, when Olívio Dutra was state governor coordinating strategic government policies, responsible for the design and implementation of monitoring and evaluation systems for public policies.

In Brasília, she assisted the transition team of President Luiz Inácio Lula da Silva in 2002. During the administration of the former President Lula da Silva (2003 - 2011), Ms. Campello participated in the coordination of the workgroup that created the Bolsa Família Programme, (Brazil's conditional cash transfer programme) and she was also the deputy advisor and coordinator of Articulation and Monitoring in the Executive Office of the President of Brazil, where she led top priority programmes in the area of development, such as the “Citizenship Territories”, Biodiesel and Ethanol Programs; the National Plan on Climate Change; and the Green Arch Effort (Mutirão Arco Verde), which made some public services, land regulation, and a sustainable development project available for the Amazon region.

== Ministry of Social Development and Fight against Hunger ==
She acted as the Minister of Social Development of Brazil from 2011 to May 2016. In the period, she coordinated the design and implementation of the national policy to eradicate extreme poverty named “Brazil sem Miséria” (Brazil without Extreme Poverty), which contributed decisively for the elevation of 22 million people out of extreme poverty, She also coordinated the National Social Assistance Policy, the National Food Security Policy, the Bolsa Família Program, the Cistern Program.
