= Arthur Chioro =

Brazilian politician

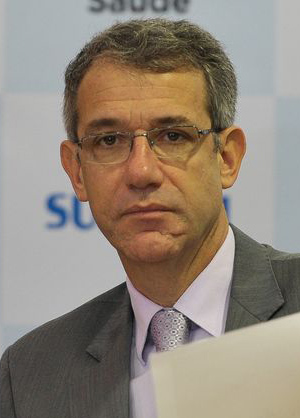
- Chioro in July 2014

Minister of Health
- In office 3 February 2014 – 1 October 2015
- President: Dilma Rousseff
- Preceded by: Alexandre Padilha
- Succeeded by: Marcelo Castro

Personal details
- Born: 5 December 1963 (age 62) Santos, SP, Brazil
- Party: PT
- Domestic partner: Thaissa Alves
- Education: Centro Universitário Serra dos Órgãos; State University of Campinas; São Paulo State University
- Occupation: Physician; Professor

Ademar Arthur Chioro dos Reis (born 5 December 1963) is a Brazilian physician, university professor, and politician affiliated with the Workers Party. From February 2014 to October 2015 he served as the minister of health in the government of Dilma Rousseff.

== Personal life ==
He graduated in medicine from the Central University of Serra dos Órgãos (UniFESO), performed a medical residency in Preventive and Social Medicine at the Botucatu Medical School, and obtained a master's degree from the State University of Campinas and a doctorate from the Federal University of São Paulo, both in collective health. Chioro identifies religiously as a spiritualists. Before he was appointed minister of health, Chioro was the secretary of health for the municipality of São Bernardo do Campo.

== Political career ==
Chioro was appointed to the role of Minister of Health on 3 February 2014, but on 21 February he was exonerated from the position of Minister of Health to take up the position of professor at Federal University of São Paulo. The procedure was part of a bureaucratic procedure, since he could not take office as a teacher already in a public position, however, as a teacher, he can accumulate the position of minister. Hence, Chioro's appointment as health minister took place after taking office as a teacher. The Secretary of Labor and Health Education Management, Mozart Sales, took over on an interim basis.

On December 31, 2014, his tenure in charge of the ministry was confirmed for the after the reelection of Dilma Rousseff, where he remained until September 29, 2015.

Political offices
Preceded by Alexandre Padilha	Minister of Health; 2014–15	Succeeded by Marcelo Castro
