= Miguel Rossetto =

Brazilian sociologist, trade unionist, and politician (born 1960)

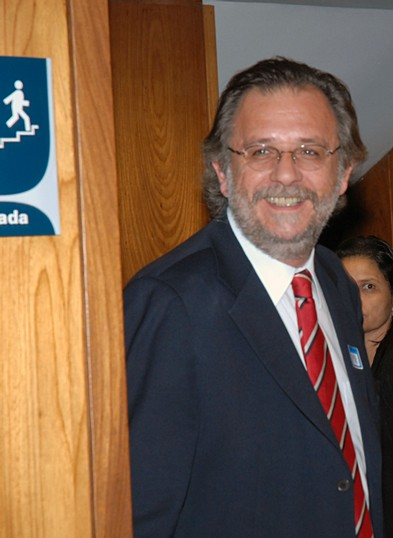

State Deputy of Rio Grande do Sul
- Incumbent
- Assumed office 1 February 2023

Minister of Labor and Employment
- In office 2 October 2015 – 12 May 2016
- Preceded by: Manoel Dias
- Succeeded by: Ronaldo Nogueira

Secretary-General of the Presidency
- In office 1 January 2015 – 2 October 2015
- Preceded by: Gilberto Carvalho
- Succeeded by: Moreira Franco

Minister of Agrarian Development
- In office 1 January 2003 – 31 March 2006
- Preceded by: José Abrão
- Succeeded by: Guilherme Cassel
- In office 17 March 2014 – 8 September 2014
- Preceded by: Pepe Vargas
- Succeeded by: Patrus Ananias (interim Laudemir André Müller)

Vice-governor of Rio Grande do Sul
- In office 1 January 1999 – 1 January 2003
- Governor: Olívio Dutra
- Preceded by: Vicente Bogo
- Succeeded by: Antônio Hohlfeldt

Personal details
- Born: Miguel Soldatelli Rossetto; 4 May 1960 (age 66) São Leopoldo, Rio Grande do Sul, Brazil
- Party: PT (1980–present)
- Education: Unisinos
- Occupation: Sociologist, trade unionist, politician

Miguel Soldatelli Rossetto (born 4 May 1960) is a Brazilian sociologist, trade unionist, and politician affiliated with the Workers' Party (PT), which he helped to establish along with the Central Única dos Trabalhadores (CUT). Rossetto was the minister of Agrarian Development in both the first Lula and Rousseff administrations; he was also the president of Petrobras Biocombustível from May 2009 to March 2014, and later became the Secretary-General of the President of the Republic and the Minister of Labour and Employment in the Rousseff administration. Prior to his career in the federal government, he was the vice-governor of the state of Rio Grande do Sul during the administration of Olívio Dutra.

== Biography ==
Graduating with a degree in social sciences from Unisinos, Rossetto began his political career at the end of the 1970s as a member of the Metallurgist's Union of São Leopoldo. He also ran for his first elected position as union president as an opposition candidate. He participated in the movement to establish the Workers' Party and was a member of the first state executive office for the party.

In 1982, he was a candidate for state deputy in Rio Grande do Sul, but would be first elected as a federal deputy in 1996. He was the president of the Worker's Union in the Industries of Polo Petroquímico de Triunfo, from 1986 to 1992. He would also become a member of the Central Única dos Trabalhadores state branch in Rio Grande do Sul, as well as their national organization.

In 1998, Rossetto was elected as vice-governor of the state of Rio Grande do Sul, on the ticket led by Olívio Dutra. On 1 January 2003, after he was defeated in his 2002 reelection campaign with Tarso Genro leading the ticket, he was nominated by president Luiz Inácio Lula da Silva to become the minister of Agrarian Development. While minister, in 2004, he was given the Order of Military Merit as a Grand Official. In 2006, he attempted to run for a vacancy in the Federal Senate, but lost the election to Pedro Simon.

On 17 March 2014, he became the Minister of Agrarian Development, now as a member of president Dilma Rousseff's cabinet. He left the ministry on 8 September of that year, to take part in the coordination of Rousseff's campaign for reelection that year.

=== Secretary General of the Presidency ===
On 29 December 2014, Rossetto was confirmed again to return to federal government, this time as the new minister of the Secretary-General of the Presidency of the Republic during the Second Dilma Rousseff administration.

=== Ministry of Labour and Employment ===
With the ministerial reforms that were made on 2 October 2014, Rossetto went on to become the Minister of Labour and Social Security. He assumed the ministry in light of the 2014 economic crisis that began to envelop the country and where unemployment grew. Like his predecessor in the position, Manoel Dias, Rossetto affirmed that unemployment could be combatted with investments in civil construction. He also recognized the relation between the resulting political crisis and the economic difficulties.

=== Other runs for office ===
On 9 December 2017, the Workers' Party Rio Grande do Sul branch announced Rossetto as their candidate to become the governor of Rio Grande do Sul for the 2018 elections. He had proposed, as one of his main proposals, to pay the salary of public servants on time, which, at that time, they had received in installments over the span of 31 months. Along with this he also proposed reforming state policies regarding public safety, education, and health. He came in third place with 1,060,209 votes (17.76%), and did not advance to the second round.

He would run again to become the vice-mayor of Porto Alegre in 2020, with the ticket being led by Manuela d'Ávila of the Communist Party of Brazil. With 187,262 votes (29%), both d'Ávila and Rossetto would advance to the second round, but losing to Sebastião Melo of the PMDB. They received 307,745 votes (45.36%) to Melo's 370,550 votes (54.64%).

== See also ==
- 2006 Rio Grande do Sul gubernatorial election
