= José Guimarães (politician) =

Brazilian politician

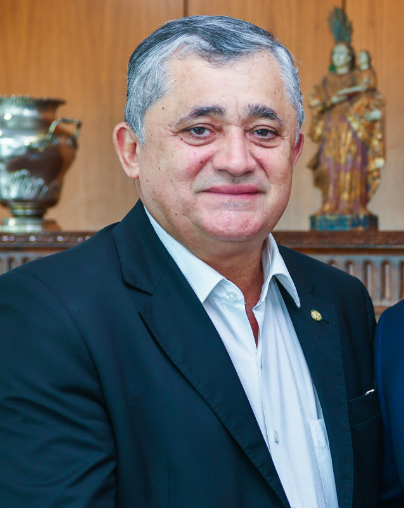

Secretary of Institutional Affairs
- Incumbent
- Assumed office 14 April 2026
- President: Luiz Inácio Lula da Silva
- Preceded by: Gleisi Hoffmann

Federal Deputy
- Incumbent
- Assumed office 1 February 2007
- Constituency: Ceará

State Deputy of Ceará
- In office 1 February 2003 – 1 February 2007
- Constituency: At-large

Personal details
- Born: José Nobre Guimarães; 13 February 1959 (age 67) Quixeramobim, Ceará, Brazil
- Party: PT (1985–present)
- Relatives: José Genoino (brother)
- Education: Federal University of Ceará (LL.B.)
- Profession: Lawyer

José Nobre Guimarães (born 13 February 1959) is a Brazilian lawyer and politician, member of the Chamber of Deputies of Brazil representing the state of Ceará and a member of the Workers' Party (PT).

Guimarães is one of the eleven children of Mr. Sebastião and Mrs. Laiz. He is brother of José Genoino, former president of the Workers' Party and former member of the Brazilian parliament.

In Ceará, he served for two terms as a member of the Legislative Assembly, also serving, most of the time, as leader of the Workers' Party. Before that, he was state president of the party for 8 years.

== Political activity ==
Son of agricultures of Quixeramobim, central countryside of Ceará, Guimarães began his political life with trade unions and in the Brazilian Committee for Amnesty. He joined the Workers' Party in 1985 and coordinated the campaign of Maria Luíza Fontenele for mayor of Fortaleza. In 1988, he became Bachelor of Laws at the Federal University of Ceará.

In 1989, he coordinated in Ceará the campaign of Luiz Inácio Lula da Silva for President of Brazil.

In 2000, he took a seat as member of the Legislative Assembly of Ceará as substitute, later elected in 2002. During this time, he served as leader of the Workers' Party and member of committees and also was rapporteur of the state's yearly budget plan.

=== Terms in the Chamber of Deputies ===
Guimarães was elected for the Chamber of Deputies in 2006, reaching the highest number of votes of the party in Ceará and reelected in 2010 as the most voted of the party and the second most voted of the state.

He became Government Vice Leader and was widely known as the man who appointed the director's board of Banco do Nordeste. In the disputed political battlefield of the Brazilian northeast region, BNB was remarked as territory of José Guimarães. Roberto Gress do Vale and José Alencar Sydrião Júnior are both Guimarães' appointments for the bank's highest management.

Guimarães was reelected in 2014 for the 55th Legislature and was chosen to be Government Leader in the Chamber. He voted against the impeachment of president Dilma Rousseff, Later, he voted against the Constitutional Amendment of the Public Expenditure Cap and against the labour reform. In August 2017, he voted in favor of the process that would open an investigation against president Michel Temer.

Guimarães was reelected for the Chamber in 2018 and 2022.

=== 'Dollars in the underwear' case ===
In 2005, amid the Mensalão scandal, then advisor of José Guimarães, José Adalberto Vieira da Silva, was caught with R$ 209,000 (US$ 85,853.13) in a handbag and US$100,000 in cash in his underwear. The parliamentary advisor was arrested by the Federal Police at the Congonhas Airport, in São Paulo.

Months after the case, many versions of the source of the money were presented. First, Adalberto said the money came from fruits sale in São Paulo. After that, Guimarães himself said the money would be used by Adalberto and José Vicente Ferreira, another advisor, for the creation of a car rental company. However, according to Courts and the Federal Police, the money was a bribe received by Kennedy Moura, then special advisor of the chairman of Banco do Nordeste and former advisor and treasurer of José Guimarães, to speed up processes of loans.

Moura, appointed by Guimarães, already had involved the politician's name in a case of a fraudulent bidding for the contracting services of Cobra Tecnologia, a subsidiary of Banco do Brasil.

Eight congressmen and advisors were considered involved in the case and were indicted for administrative dishonesty, with convicted: Adalberto himself, the CEO of the state bank, Roberto Smith and the former special advisor Kennedy Moura. José Guimarães had his name removed from the complaints by the Superior Court of Justice due to lack of evidence. After 16 years, the Federal Court of Ceará finished the complaint.

Political offices
Preceded by Gleisi Hoffmann	Secretary of Institutional Affairs; 2026–present	Incumbent
