= Ministry of Agrarian Development (Brazil) =

Federal ministry of Brazil

Ministry of Agrarian Development and Family Agriculture
- Portuguese: Ministério do Desenvolvimento Agrário e Agricultura Familiar
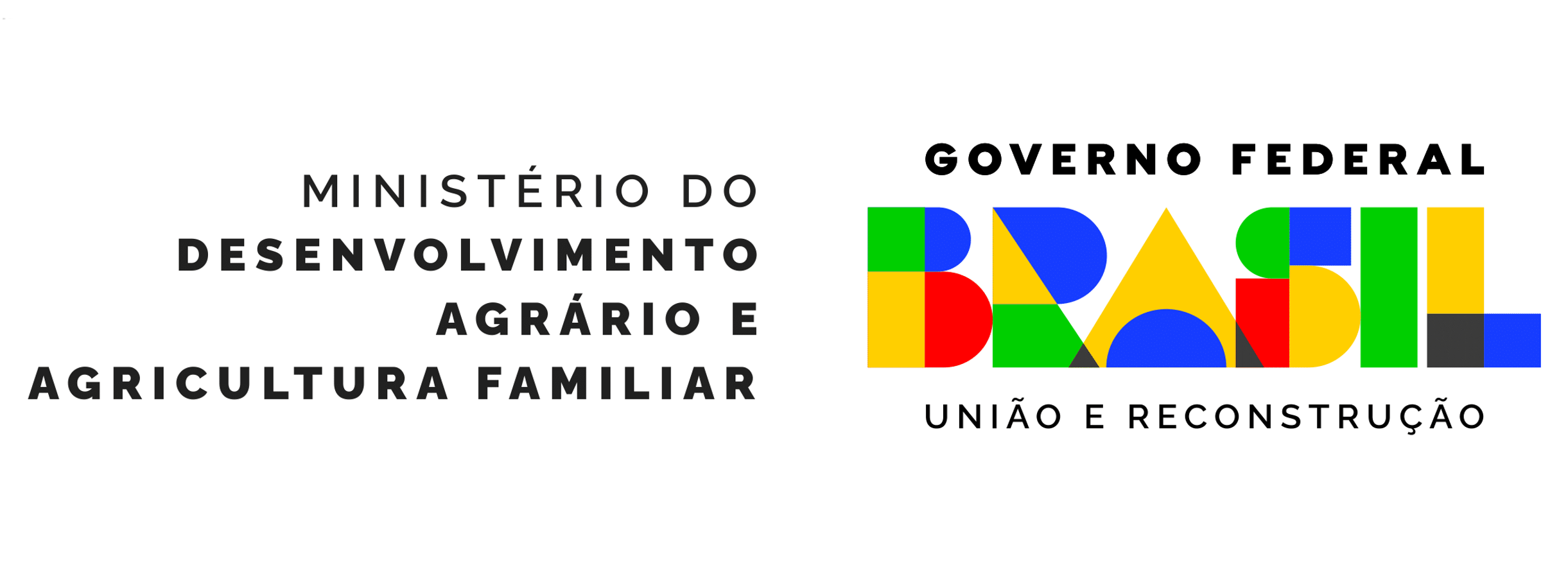

Ministry overview
- Formed: 24 August 1982; 43 years ago
- Type: Ministry
- Jurisdiction: Federal government of Brazil
- Headquarters: Esplanada dos Ministérios, Bloco C Brasília, Federal District
- Annual budget: $4.98 b BRL (2023)
- Ministry executives: Paulo Teixeira, Minister; Fernanda Machiaveli, Executive-Secretary; Patrícia Vasconcelos, Secretary of Familiary Agriculture and Agroecology; Milton Fornazieri, Secretary of Supply, Cooperativism and Food Sovereignty; Moisés Savian, Secretary of Land Governance, Territorial and Socio-environmental Development; Edmilton Cerqueira, Secretary of Quilombolas and Traditional Territories and Productive Systems
- Website: www.gov.br/mda/

The Ministry of Agrarian Development and Family Agriculture (Portuguese: Ministério do Desenvolvimento Agrário e Agricultura Familiar, abbreviated MDA) is a cabinet-level federal ministry in Brazil.

The MDA was established in 1999 to oversee land reform in Brazil and promote sustainable practices. The agency oversees the Center for Agrarian Studies and Rural Development (NEAD) and the National Institute for Colonization and Agrarian Reform (Incra).

After taking office as Acting President, Michel Temer merged the ministry with the Ministry of Social Development. It was later reestablished by President Luiz Inácio Lula da Silva in 2023. The incumbent minister is Paulo Teixeira.

== Structure ==
- Executive Secretariat
  - Sub-Secretariat for Rural Women
  - Undersecretariat for Planning, Budget and Administration
  - Department of Evaluation, Monitoring, Studies and Strategic Information; and
  - Executive Secretariat of Collegiate Bodies
- Secretariat of Family Farming and Agroecology
  - Department of Financing, Protection and Support for Productive Family Inclusion;
  - Department of Innovation for Family Farming and Agroecological Transition; and
  - Department of Technical Assistance and Rural Extension
- Secretariat for Supply, Cooperativism and Food Sovereignty
  - Department for Support of the Acquisition and Marketing of Family Farming Products; and
  - Department of Cooperativism, Support for Sanitary Inclusion, Agroindustry and Certification of Family Production
- Secretariat of Land Governance, Territorial Development and Socio-environmental Affairs
  - Department of Land Governance; and
  - Department of Territorial and Socio-environmental Development
- Secretariat for Quilombola and Traditional Territories and Productive Systems
  - Department of Recognition, Protection of Traditional Territories and Ethnodevelopment
- National Council for Sustainable Rural Development - Condraf
- Federal Superintendencies for Agrarian Development - SFDA/MDA
- Center for Agrarian Studies and Rural Development (NEAD)

=== Linked agencies ===
- National Agency for Technical Assistance and Rural Extension (Anater)
- Supply Centers of Minas Gerais (Ceasa Minas)
- São Paulo General Warehouses and Storage Company (CEAGESP)
- National Supply Company (Conab)
- National Institute for Colonization and Agrarian Reform (INCRA)

== List of ministers ==
No.	Portrait	Minister	Took office	Left office	Time in office	Party	President
1	Danilo Venturini	Danilo Venturini (1922–2015)	24 August 1982	15 March 1985	2 years, 203 days	Independent	João Figueiredo (PDS)
2	Nelson de Figueredo Ribeiro	Nelson de Figueredo Ribeiro (born 1930)	30 April 1985	28 May 1986	1 year, 28 days	Independent	José Sarney (MDB)
3	Dante de Oliveira	Dante de Oliveira (1952–2006)	28 May 1986	2 June 1987	1 year, 5 days	MDB	José Sarney (MDB)
4	Marcos Freire	Marcos Freire (1931–1987)	4 June 1987	8 September 1987	96 days	MDB	José Sarney (MDB)
5	Jader Barbalho	Jader Barbalho (born 1944)	22 September 1987	29 July 1988	311 days	MDB	José Sarney (MDB)
–	Leopoldo Bessone	Leopoldo Bessone (1942–2013); Acting	17 August 1988	15 February 1989	182 days	MDB	José Sarney (MDB)
6	Raul Jungmann	Raul Jungmann (1952–2026)	30 April 1996	4 April 2002	5 years, 339 days	PPS	Fernando Henrique Cardoso (PSDB)
7	José Abrão	José Abrão (born 1945)	4 April 2002	1 January 2003	272 days	PSDB	Fernando Henrique Cardoso (PSDB)
8	Miguel Rossetto	Miguel Rossetto (born 1960)	1 January 2003	31 March 2006	3 years, 89 days	PT	Luiz Inácio Lula da Silva (PT)
9	Guilherme Cassel	Guilherme Cassel (born 1956)	31 March 2006	1 January 2011	4 years, 276 days	PT	Luiz Inácio Lula da Silva (PT)
10	Afonso Florence	Afonso Florence (born 1960)	1 January 2011	14 March 2012	1 year, 73 days	PT	Dilma Rousseff (PT)
11	Pepe Vargas	Pepe Vargas (born 1958)	14 March 2012	17 March 2014	2 years, 3 days	PT	Dilma Rousseff (PT)
12	Miguel Rossetto	Miguel Rossetto (born 1960)	17 March 2014	8 September 2014	175 days	PT	Dilma Rousseff (PT)
–	Laudemir André Müller	Laudemir André Müller (born 1975); Acting	8 September 2014	1 January 2015	115 days	Independent	Dilma Rousseff (PT)
13	Patrus Ananias	Patrus Ananias (born 1952)	1 January 2015	14 April 2016	1 year, 104 days	PT	Dilma Rousseff (PT)
–	Maria Fernanda Ramos Coelho	Maria Fernanda Ramos Coelho (born 1961); Acting	14 April 2016	19 April 2016	5 days	Independent	Dilma Rousseff (PT)
14	Patrus Ananias	Patrus Ananias (born 1952)	19 April 2016	12 May 2016	23 days	PT	Dilma Rousseff (PT)
15	Paulo Teixeira	Paulo Teixeira (born 1961)	1 January 2023	Incumbent	3 years, 68 days	PT	Luiz Inácio Lula da Silva (PT)

== See also ==
- Ministry of Fishing and Aquaculture
- Ministry of Agriculture (Brazil)
