= Brasil sem Miséria =

Social Program

Brasil Sem Miséria ("Brazil Without Extreme Poverty") is a social program of the government of Brazil created by President Rousseff as an expansion of the Bolsa Familia program of her predecessor, President Lula. It especially focuses on the Northeast Region, Brazil, historically the most impoverished region in the country. Brasil Sem Miséria is planned to expand public services including "documentation, electricity, literacy, medical, dental and ophthalmic treatment, day care and sanitation".

The 2010 Census classified 8.5% of the Brazil population as being in extreme poverty.

== See also ==
- Great Society
- Welfare state
- Socialism
- Poverty
