= Centro Universitário Curitiba =

Centro Universitário Curitiba (abbreviated UNICURITIBA) is a Brazilian Higher Education institution.
