= Alexandre Padilha =

Brazilian physician and politician (born 1971)

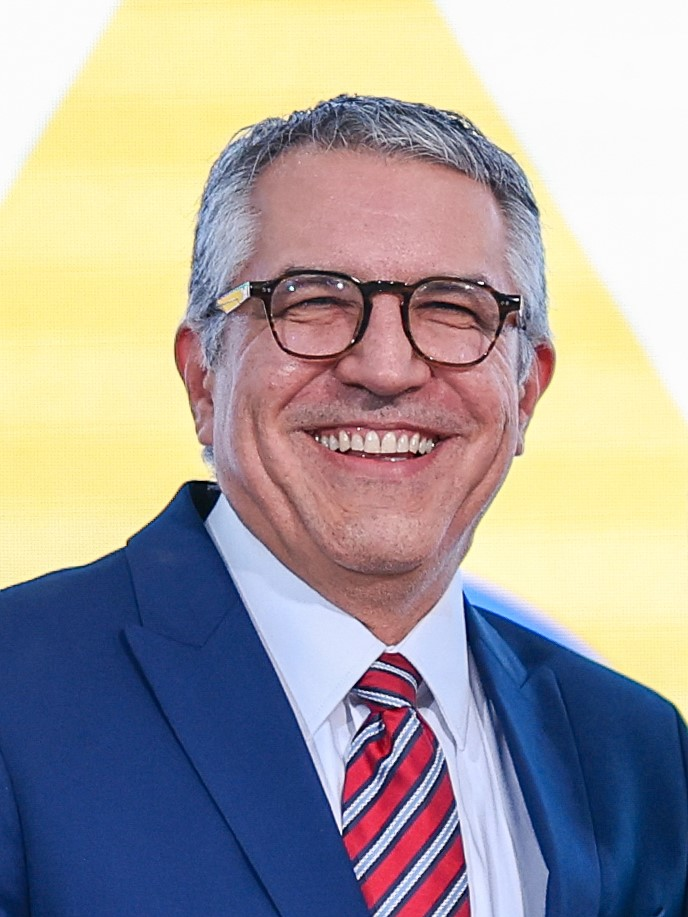

Minister of Health
- Incumbent
- Assumed office 10 March 2025
- President: Luiz Inácio Lula da Silva
- Preceded by: Nísia Trindade
- In office 1 January 2011 – 2 February 2014
- President: Dilma Rousseff
- Preceded by: José Gomes Temporão
- Succeeded by: Arthur Chioro

Federal Deputy
- Incumbent
- Assumed office 1 February 2019 (Note: Since 2023, Padilha has taken a leave of absence from his parliamentary duties to serve as Secretary of Institutional Affairs, and since March 2025, as Minister of Health.)
- Constituency: São Paulo

Secretary of Institutional Affairs
- In office 1 January 2023 – 10 March 2025
- President: Luiz Inácio Lula da Silva
- Preceded by: Pepe Vargas
- Succeeded by: Gleisi Hoffmann
- In office 28 September 2009 – 31 December 2010
- President: Luiz Inácio Lula da Silva
- Preceded by: José Múcio
- Succeeded by: Luiz Sérgio de Oliveira

Municipal Secretary of Health of São Paulo
- In office 14 August 2015 – 31 December 2016
- Mayor: Fernando Haddad
- Preceded by: José Filippi Júnior
- Succeeded by: Wilson Pollara

Personal details
- Born: Alexandre Rocha Santos Padilha; 14 September 1971 (age 55) São Paulo, Brazil
- Party: PT (since 1988)
- Spouse: Thássia Alves (m. 2012)
- Education: State University of Campinas; University of São Paulo
- Profession: Physician

Alexandre Rocha Santos Padilha (Brazilian Portuguese: [aleˈʃɐ̃dɾi ˈʁɔʃɐ ˈsɐ̃tus paˈdʒiʎɐ]; born 14 September 1971) is a Brazilian physician and politician affiliated with the Workers Party (PT). He served as minister of Institutional Relations in the current government of President Luiz Inácio Lula da Silva from 2023 to 2025, a position he previously held from 2009 to 2011. He served as minister of health under Dilma Rousseff from 2011 to 2014. He unsuccessfully ran for governor of São Paulo state in the 2014 election. On 1 January 2023, he was once again named Secretary of Institutional Affairs by President Luiz Inácio Lula da Silva, who reinstated the office.

== See also ==
- Central Única dos Trabalhadores
- World Health Organization

== Notes ==
Political offices
Preceded by José Múcio Monteiro	Secretary of Institutional Affairs; 2009–2011	Succeeded by Luiz Sérgio de Oliveira
Preceded by José Gomes Temporão	Minister of Health; 2011–2014	Succeeded by Arthur Chioro
Preceded by José de Filippi Júnior	Municipal Secretary of Health of São Paulo; 2015–2017	Succeeded by Wilson Pollara
Preceded by Pepe Vargas	Secretary of Institutional Affairs; 2023–2025	Succeeded by Gleisi Hoffmann
Preceded by Nísia Trindade	Minister of Health; 2025–present	Incumbent
Party political offices
Preceded by Aloizio Mercadante	PT nominee for Governor of São Paulo; 2014	Succeeded by Luiz Marinho
