= Júlio Soares de Moura Neto =

Brazilian Navy admiral (1943–2026)

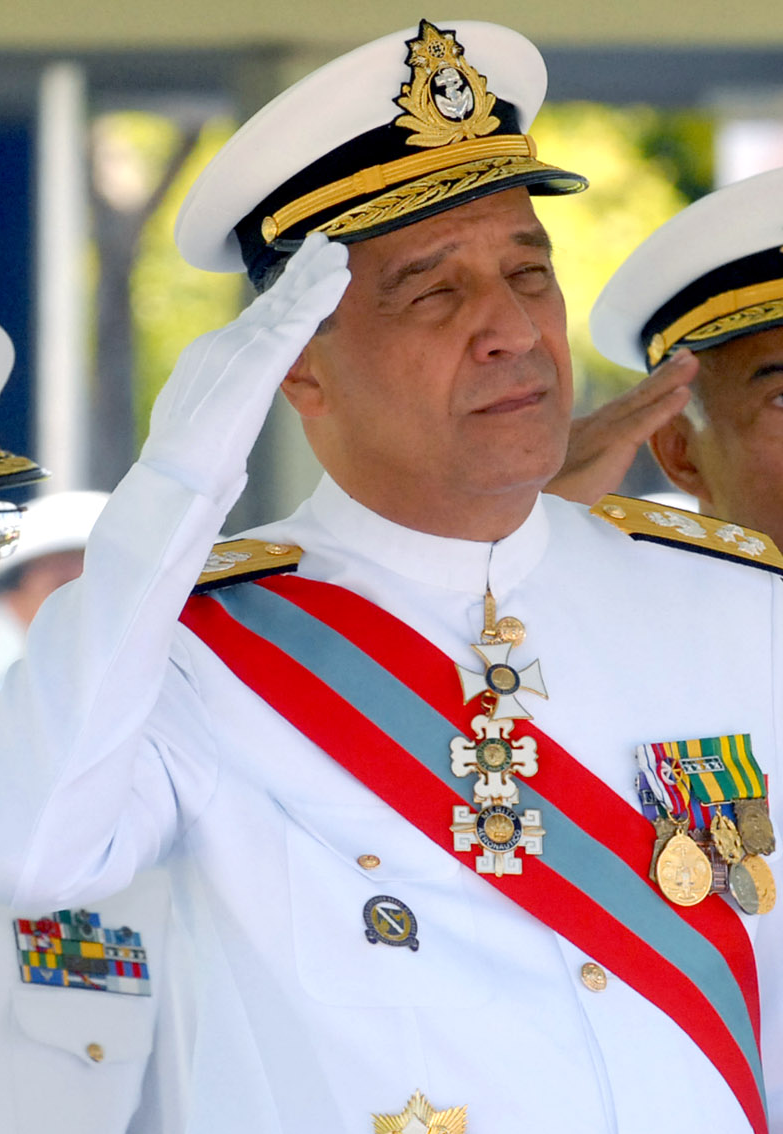
- Admiral Moura Neto in 2007
- Born: 20 March 1943; Rio de Janeiro, Brazil
- Died: 10 February 2026 (aged 82)
- Military career
- Allegiance: Brazil
- Branch: Brazilian Navy
- Service years: 1959–2026
- Rank: Admiral

Admiral Júlio Soares de Moura Neto (20 March 1943 – 10 February 2026) was an admiral in the Brazilian Navy. He was the commander of the Brazilian Navy from 2007 to 2015.

== Biography ==
Moura Neto was born in Rio de Janeiro on 20 March 1943.

He joined the Brazilian Navy in 1959.

Moura Neto died on 10 February 2026, at the age of 82.

== Honours and awards ==
His decorations include Defense Merit Order, Naval Merit Order, Military Merit Order, Air Force Merit Order, Rio Branco Order, Military Justice Merit Order, Military Gold Medal (platinum ribbon for 40 years of service), Tamandaré Merit Medal, Sea Service Merit Medal (four silver anchors for 1580 days in operations at sea), Medal of the “Pacificador”, Santos Dumont Merit Medal, Paraguayan National Navy Medal, and Argentinian Navy Medal.
