= Patrus Ananias =

Brazilian politician

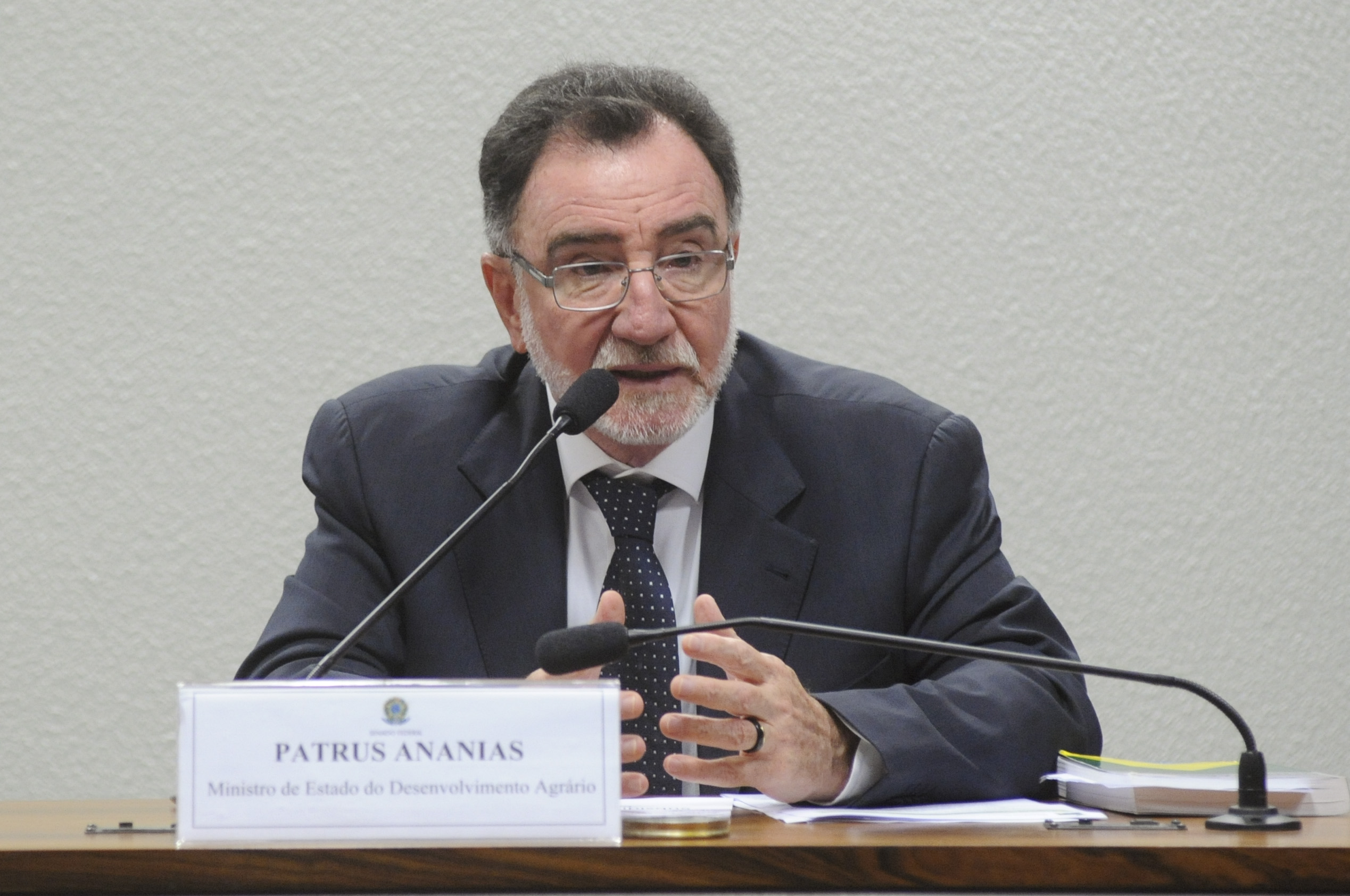

Federal Deputy from Minas Gerais
- Incumbent
- Assumed office 1 February 2015
- In office 1 February 2003 – 1 February 2007

5th Academic of the 39th Chair of the Mineira Academy of Letters
- Incumbent
- Assumed office 1996
- Preceded by: Edgar Mata Machado

Minister of Agrarian Development
- In office 19 April 2016 – 12 May 2016
- President: Dilma Rousseff
- Preceded by: Maria Fernanda Ramos Coelho (acting)
- Succeeded by: Paulo Teixeira (in 2023; office abolished 2016-22)
- In office 1 January 2015 – 14 April 2016
- President: Dilma Rousseff
- Preceded by: Laudemir André Müller (acting)
- Succeeded by: Maria Fernanda Ramos Coelho (acting)

Minister of Social Development and Fight Against Hunger
- In office 23 January 2004 – 31 March 2010
- President: Luiz Inácio Lula da Silva
- Succeeded by: Márcia Lopes

Mayor of Belo Horizonte
- In office 1 January 1993 – 1 January 1997
- Preceded by: Eduardo Azeredo
- Succeeded by: Célio de Castro

Councilman of Belo Horizonte
- In office 1 January 1989 – 1 January 1993

Personal details
- Born: Patrus Ananias de Sousa; 26 January 1952 (age 74) Bocaiúva, MG, Brazil
- Party: PT (Since 1981)
- Parents: Jair Ananias de Sousa (father); Maria Tereza Patrus Ananias (mother)
- Education: Federal University of Minas Gerais (B); Pontifical Catholic University of Minas Gerais (M) (L); Complutense University of Madrid (D)
- Occupation: Professor, lawyer

Patrus Ananias de Sousa (Bocaiúva, 26 January 1952) is a Brazilian lawyer and politician affiliated with the Workers' Party (PT). He was Minister of Agrarian Development during the second term of president Dilma Rousseff.

== Biography ==
=== Mayor of Belo Horizonte ===
In 1992, he was elected mayor of Belo Horizonte, with Célio de Castro (PSB) as Vice Mayor, defeating former mayor Maurício Campos (PL) on the second round, as well as Sérgio Ferrara (PMDB) and the then federal deputy Aécio Neves (PSDB), who finished in 3rd place.

His term as mayor was marked by structural reforms in city administration, changes in city hall organization, in public planning, and in public policy. He engaged in a social development agenda, with policies to address poverty, food security, jobs and income promotion, as well as investments in education and in health. He also implemented a participatory budget. His public administration was recognized as model through an award from the United Nations.

=== Federal Deputy ===
In 2002, he was elected federal deputy by the PT, reaching more than 520,000 votes. He is, until nowadays, the biggest voting get by a candidate to federal deputy in Minas Gerais, corresponding to 5.4% of the valid votes. In the Federal Chamber, assumed the vice presidency of the Constitution and Justice Committee and became member of the Ethics and Parliamentary Decour Council. Participated, also, the Regional Development and Urban and Interior Development Committees.

=== Minister of Social Development ===
In 2004, amid a political crisis involving the social policies promoted by the Federal Government, Ananias was invited by president Lula to assume the Ministry of Social Development and Fight Against Hunger, an office in which he was kept until March 2010. It was during his administration as minister that Bolsa Família, a federal program for families currently in poverty or extreme poverty, was implemented. In this period, almost 13 million families were granted Bolsa Família.

=== Election for Mayor of Belo Horizonte ===
In the beginning of 2010, he faced the former mayor of Belo Horizonte, Fernando Pimentel, in the PT primaries for Governor of Minas Gerais. He lost the nomination but, on 31 March 2010, left the Ministry to run for office as candidate to Vice Governor in the opposition ticket with the then Minister of Communications and senator Hélio Costa. On 7 June 2010, he officialized his candidacy for Vice Governor of the State of Minas Gerais, along with Hélio Costa. They were defeated by the then Governor Antônio Anastasia (PSDB), elected Vice Governor in 2006 along with Aécio Neves, who left the office to run for Senator.

In 2012, he ran again for Mayor of Belo Horizonte against Márcio Lacerda (PSB) and was defeated in the first round. He obtained 40% of the votes, against his opponent's 54%. He was chosen for that election after the rupture of the alliance PT-PSB, then in the command of the state's capital. It had been set to feature the federal deputy Miguel Corrêa, someone close to minister Fernando Pimentel, as Márcio Lacerda's Vice Mayor.

=== Minister of Agrarian Development ===
On 29 December 2014, he was officially announced as the new Minister of Agrarian Development in Dilma Rousseff's second cabinet. On 14 April 2016, he left the Ministry temporarily due to the vote of the impeachment proceedings against Dilma Rousseff. On 19 April, he returned to office, which he kept until Rousseff's suspension and acting president Michel Temer's swearing in.

He is also a member of the World Future Council.

Honorary titles
Preceded by Edgar Mata Machado	5th Academic of the 39th Chair of the Mineira Academy of Letters; 1996–present	Incumbent
Political offices
Preceded by Eduardo Azeredo	Mayor of Belo Horizonte; 1993–1997	Succeeded by Célio de Castro
Office established	Minister of Social Development and Fight Against Hunger; 2004–10	Succeeded by Márcia Lopes
Preceded by Laudemir André Müller (acting)	Minister of Agrarian Development; 2015–16	Succeeded by Maria Fernanda Ramos Coelho (acting)
Preceded by Maria Fernanda Ramos Coelho (acting)	Minister of Agrarian Development; 2015–16	Succeeded by Paulo Teixeira
