= Ministry of Social Development and Fight against Hunger (Brazil) =

Brazilian ministry

Ministry of Social Development and Assistance, Family and Fight against Hunger
- Portuguese: Ministério do Desenvolvimento e Assistência Social, Família e Combate à Fome
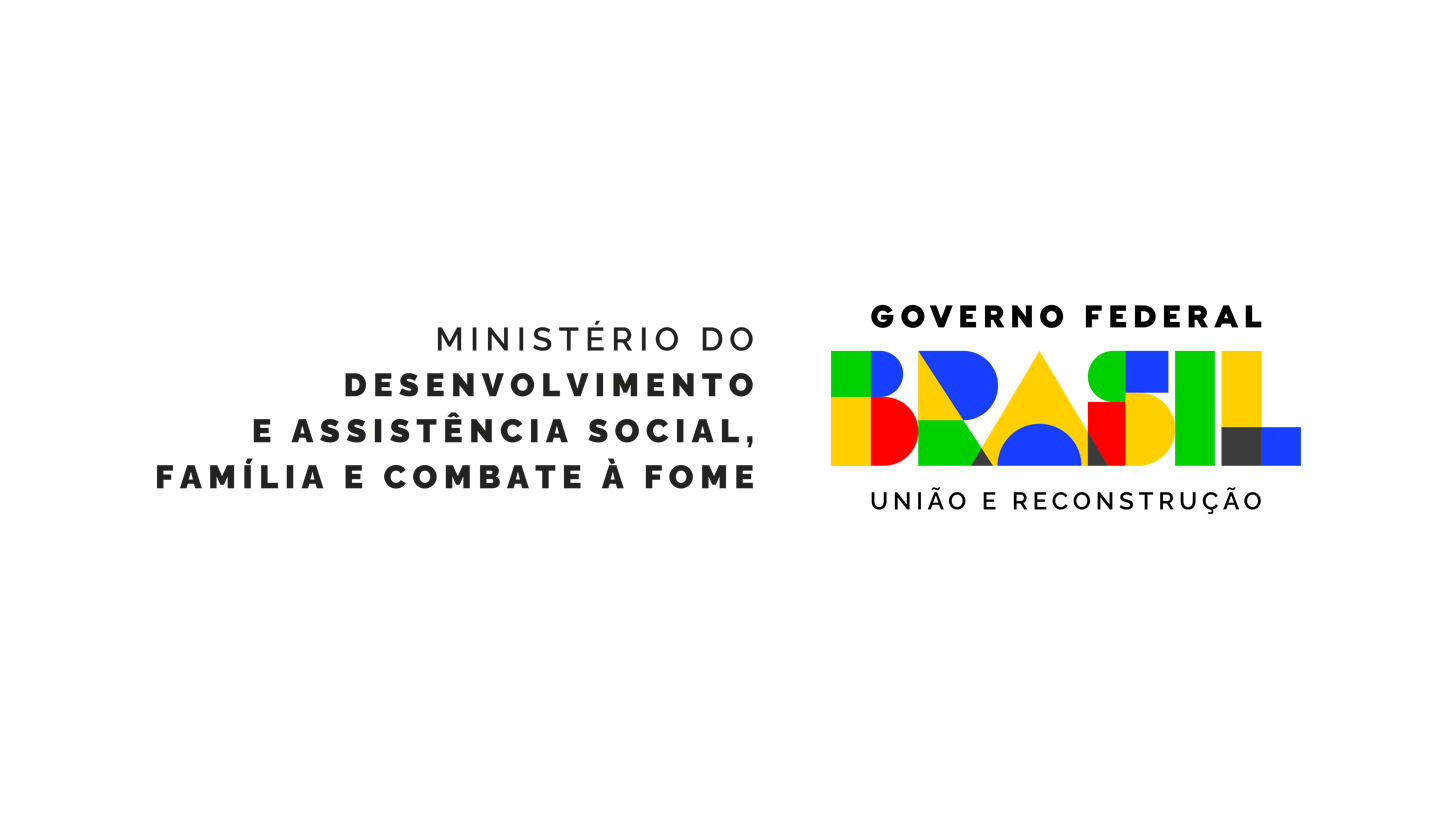

Agency overview
- Formed: 23 January 2004; 22 years ago
- Type: Ministry
- Jurisdiction: Federal government of Brazil
- Headquarters: Esplanada dos Ministérios, Bloco A Brasília, Federal District
- Annual budget: $276 b BRL (2023)
- Agency executives: Wellington Dias, Minister; Osmar de Almeida Júnior, Executive-Secretary; Valéria Burity, Secretary of Fight Against Poverty and Hunger; Letícia Bartholo, Secretary of Evaluation, Information Management and CadÚnico; Eliane Custodio, Secretary of Basic Income; Lilian Rahal, Secretary of Food and Nutritional Security; Luiz Carlos Everton, Secretary of Socioeconomic Inclusion; Laís Wendel Abramo, Secretary of Aid Policy and Family; André Quintão, Secretary of Social Assistance
- Website: www.gov.br/mds/

The Ministry of Social Development and Assistance, Family and Fight against Hunger (MSD) (Portuguese: Ministério do Desenvolvimento Social, Assistência, Família e Combate à Fome, MDS) is a cabinet-level federal ministry in Brazil.

== History ==
The ministry was established in 2004 from the merger of the Special Ministry of Food and Nutritional Security, the Ministry of Social Assistance, and the Executive Secretariat of the Inter-ministerial Manager Council of Bolsa Família. It administers Bolsa Família, the National Social Assistance Fund (SANF), Industry Social Service (SESI), Commerce Social Service (SESC), and Transport Social Service (SEST).

Under the Presidency of Jair Bolsonaro, the ministry was incorporated into the Ministry of Citizenship, together with the Ministry of Sports and Ministry of Culture.

== List of ministers ==
Below is a list of ministers of social development and fight against hunger.

No.	Portrait	Minister	Took office	Left office	Time in office	Party	President
1	Patrus Ananias	Patrus Ananias (born 1952)	23 January 2004	31 March 2010	6 years, 67 days	PT	Luiz Inácio Lula da Silva (PT)
2	Márcia Lopes	Márcia Lopes (born 1957)	31 March 2010	1 January 2011	276 days	PT	Luiz Inácio Lula da Silva (PT)
3	Tereza Campello	Tereza Campello (born 1962)	1 January 2011	12 May 2016	5 years, 132 days	PT	Dilma Rousseff (PT)
4	Osmar Terra	Osmar Terra (born 1950)	12 May 2016	6 April 2018	1 year, 329 days	MDB	Michel Temer (MDB)
5	Alberto Beltrame	Alberto Beltrame	6 April 2018	1 January 2019	270 days	MDB	Michel Temer (MDB)
6	Wellington Dias	Wellington Dias (born 1962)	1 January 2023	Incumbent	3 years, 266 days	PT	Luiz Inácio Lula da Silva (PT)
