= Secretariat of Institutional Affairs =

- Portuguese: Secretaria de Relações Institucionais

Ministry overview
- Formed: 21 July 2005; 20 years ago
- Superseding Ministry: Secretariat of Government
- Jurisdiction: Federal government of Brazil
- Headquarters: Planalto Palace, Praça dos Três Poderes; Brasília, Federal District
- Annual budget: $2.29 b BRL (2023)
- Minister responsible: José Nobre Guimarães
- Website: www.gov.br/sri/

The Secretariat of Institutional Affairs (Portuguese: Secretaria de Relações Institucionais) is an agency linked to the Presidency of the Republic of Brazil. It was formed through Provisional Measura no. 259 of 21 July 2005 and converted into Law no. 11204 of 5 December 2005. It acted in the following areas:

1. Political coordination of the Government;
2. Conduction of the relationship between the Government, the National Congress and political parties;
3. Interlocution with States, the Federal District and Municipalities;
4. Coordination of the working of the Social and Economic Development Council.

It had its structure and organization defined by Decree no. 6207 of 18 September 2007. The head of the Secretariat had a status of Minister of State.

On 7 April 2015, the attributions of Institutional Affairs were transferred to the Vice President Office, at the time headed by Michel Temer, and the Secretariat was dissolved.

On 2 October 2015, the Secretariat of Government was created, which merged, among other attributions, the Institutional Affairs and political articulation with the Congress.

On 1 January 2023, it was reinstated by President Luiz Inácio Lula da Silva.

== Secretaries ==
No.	Portrait	Secretary	Took office	Left office	Time in office	Party	President
1	Jaques Wagner	Jaques Wagner (born 1951)	20 July 2005	31 March 2006	254 days	PT	Luiz Inácio Lula da Silva (PT)
2	Tarso Genro	Tarso Genro (born 1947)	3 April 2006	16 March 2007	347 days	PT	Luiz Inácio Lula da Silva (PT)
3	Walfrido dos Mares Guia	Walfrido dos Mares Guia (born 1942)	23 March 2007	26 November 2007	248 days	PTB	Luiz Inácio Lula da Silva (PT)
4	José Múcio	José Múcio (born 1948)	26 November 2007	28 September 2009	1 year, 306 days	PTB	Luiz Inácio Lula da Silva (PT)
5	Alexandre Padilha	Alexandre Padilha (born 1971)	28 September 2009	1 January 2011	1 year, 95 days	PT	Luiz Inácio Lula da Silva (PT)
6	Luiz Sérgio de Oliveira	Luiz Sérgio de Oliveira (born 1958)	1 January 2011	10 June 2011	160 days	PT	Dilma Rousseff (PT)
7	Ideli Salvatti	Ideli Salvatti (born 1952)	10 June 2011	1 April 2014	2 years, 295 days	PT	Dilma Rousseff (PT)
8	Ricardo Berzoini	Ricardo Berzoini (born 1960)	1 April 2014	1 January 2015	275 days	PT	Dilma Rousseff (PT)
9	Pepe Vargas	Pepe Vargas (born 1958)	1 January 2015	7 April 2015	96 days	PT	Dilma Rousseff (PT)
10	Alexandre Padilha	Alexandre Padilha (born 1971)	1 January 2023	10 March 2025	2 years, 68 days	PT	Luiz Inácio Lula da Silva (PT)
11	Gleisi Hoffmann	Gleisi Hoffmann (born 1965)	10 March 2025	Incumbent	1 year, 89 days	PT	Luiz Inácio Lula da Silva (PT)
12	José Guimarães	José Guimarães (born 1959)	14 April 2026	Incumbent	54 days	PT	Luiz Inácio Lula da Silva (PT)
