= 2009 Workers' Party (Brazil) leadership election =

Workers' Party leadership election
- November 22, 2009 (1st round); December 6, 2009 (2nd round)
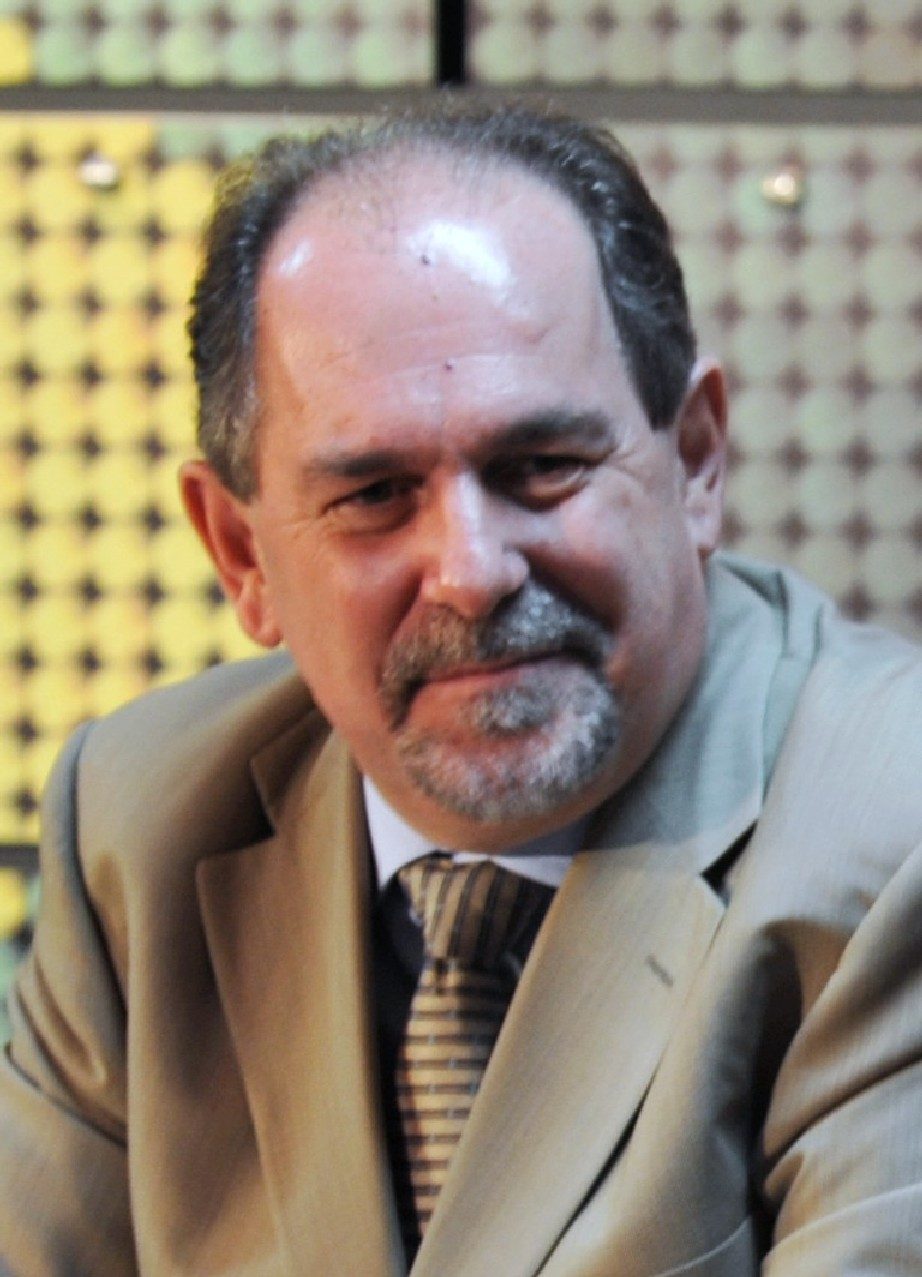

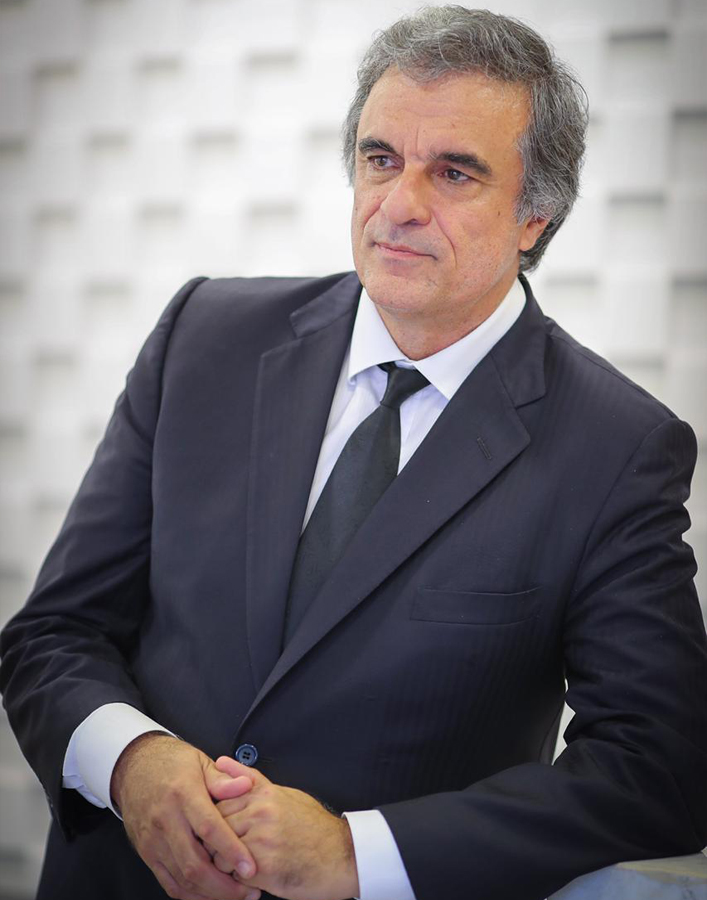
Candidate	José Eduardo Dutra	José Eduardo Cardozo
Party	PT	PT
Popular vote	271.400	79.867
Percentage	58.4%	17.9%
President before election
Ricardo Berzoini
Elected President
José Eduardo Dutra

The 2009 Workers' Party Leadership Election was held on November 22 in order to renew all leaderships of the party (regional, municipal, state and national). On December 6, a second round will be held to determine the new presidents of the party on the states of Minas Gerais, Minas Gerais, Maranhão, Rio Grande do Norte, and Amapá, and several municipalities. On the party's fourth direct election process (Portuguese: processo de eleição direta - PED), 1,3 million members were able to vote. The first round results were officially released on November 26, with former Petrobras president José Eduardo Dutra being elected the national president of the Workers' Party with over 58% of the vote.

== National results ==
=== President ===
Former Petrobras president José Eduardo Dutra, from the faction O Partido que Muda o Brasil (English: The Party that Changes Brazil), also known as the "Majority Field", was elected president on the first round with over 58% of the vote. His election is seen as favoring the party's alliance with the Brazilian Democratic Movement Party for the general election of 2010, in which he will be responsible for the party's presidential campaign. He was criticized by the press for having mensalão scandal figures, such as José Dirceu, on his coalition. This will be the first time since the corruption scheme was triggered that such names will return to the National Leadership of the party. The candidate for Mensagem ao Partido (English: Message to the Party), - a dissident faction from the "Majority Field" that arose after the scandal to ask for the expulsion of those involved -, José Eduardo Cardzo, a federal deputy for the State of São Paulo was the runner-up, having received almost 18% of the vote, a decrease from his 19% score in the last election. Nevertheless, he had almost 20,000 more votes, once the party membership grew significantly in the period. Geraldo Magela of Movimento Partido para Todos (English: Movement Party for All) had 12% of the vote, followed by Iriny Lopes of Esquerda Socialista (English: Socialist Left) with 9.9%, Markus Sokol of Terra, Trabalho e Soberania (English: Land, Labor and Sovereignty) with 1%, and Serge Goulart of Virar à Esquerda! Retornar ao Socialismo! (English: Turn to Left! Return to Socialism!) with 0.7%.

2009 Workers' Party leadership election
Faction	Candidate	Votes	%	±%
O Partido que Muda o Brasil	José Eduardo Dutra	271,400	58.4	N/A
Mensagem ao Partido	José Eduardo Cardozo	79,867	17.9	N/A
Movimento: Partido para Todos	Geraldo Magela	58,313	12.1	N/A
Esquerda Socialista	Iriny Lopes	50,334	9.9	N/A
Terra, Trabalho e Soberania	Markus Sokol	4,951	1.0	N/A
Virar à Esquerda, Reatar com o Socialismo	Serge Goulart	3,292	0.7	N/A

=== National Leadership ===
The National Leadership of the Workers' Party is composed of 81 seats to be divided between the factions with the largest number of votes. O Partido que Muda o Brasil also scored the highest number of votes, in spite of having received nearly 20,000 fewer votes than in the presidential race.

Faction	Votes	%
O Partido que Muda o Brasil	250,034	55.2%
Mensagem ao Partido	71,663	15.8%
Esquerda Socialista	47,984	10.6%
Movimento Partido Para Todos	42,657	9.5%
Partido Para Todos	24,963	5.5%
Contraponto	6,385	1.4%
Terra, Trabalho e Soberania	5,908	1.3%
Virar à Esquerda! Retornar ao Socialismo!	3,392	0.8%
