= Paulo Bernardo =

Brazilian politician (born 1952)

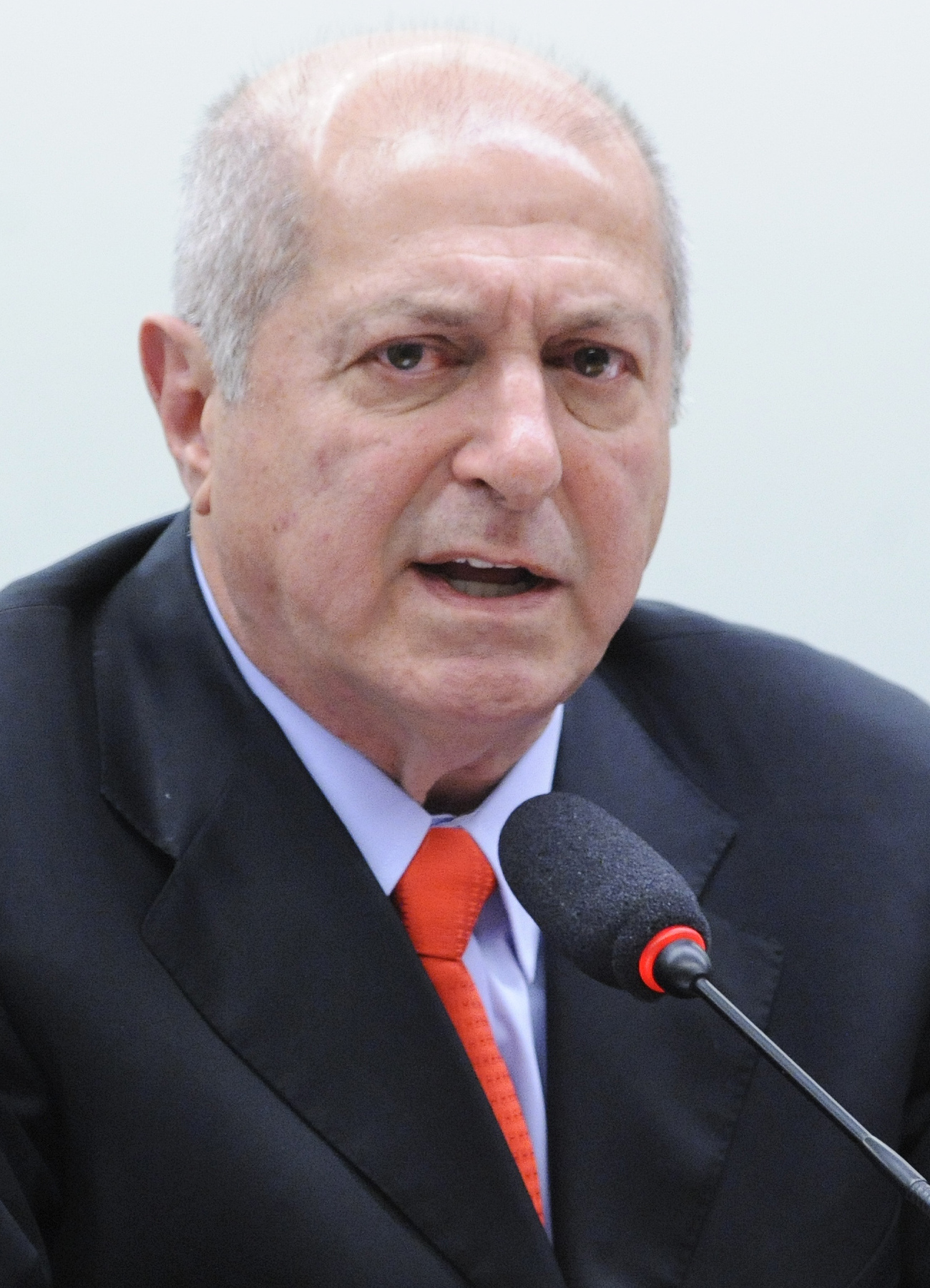

Minister of Communications
- In office 1 January 2011 – 1 January 2015
- President: Dilma Rousseff
- Preceded by: José Artur Filardi
- Succeeded by: Ricardo Berzoini

Minister of Planning, Budget and Management
- In office 22 March 2005 – 1 January 2011
- President: Luiz Inácio Lula da Silva
- Preceded by: Nelson Machado
- Succeeded by: Miriam Belchior

Federal Deputy for Paraná
- In office 1 February 2003 – 22 March 2005
- In office 1 February 1991 – 1 February 1999

Personal details
- Born: Paulo Bernardo Silva; 10 March 1952 (age 73); São Paulo, São Paulo, Brazil
- Political party: PT (Since 1986)
- Spouse: Gleisi Hoffmann (m. 1998; div. 2019)
- Children: 2

Paulo Bernardo Silva (born 10 March 1952) is a Brazilian politician, member of the Workers' Party (PT). He was Minister of Communications during the government of Dilma Rousseff and Minister of Planning during the government of Luiz Inácio Lula da Silva.

== Personal life ==
Paulo Bernardo da Silva was born in São Paulo, son of Alfredo Manoel da Silva and Sydnéa Bernardes da Silva. He is an employee of Bank of Brazil and was undergraduate in Geology for the University of Brasília (UnB). Bernardo was married to Federal Deputy Gleisi Hoffmann (PT).

== Political career ==
Bernardo joined politics through unionism as a member of the director's board of the Paraná Bank Officers Union. He was Federal Deputy from Paraná in 3 legislatures (1991–1995, 1995–1999 and 2003–2005).

In this period, he also held the offices of State Secretary of Finances of Mato Grosso do Sul between January 1999 and December 2000 and Municipal Secretary of Finances of Londrina between January 2001 and March 2002.

=== Electoral results ===
Year	Office	Votes	Result
1990	Federal Deputy from Paraná	9,644	Elect
1994	Federal Deputy from Paraná	20,459	Elect
2002	Federal Deputy from Paraná	72,831	Elect

=== Minister ===
On 22 March 2005, he licensed from his term as Federal Deputy to take office as Minister of Planning, Budget and Management, during the government of the then president, Luiz Inácio Lula da Silva.

He was also part of Dilma Rousseff's government since the beginning, as Minister of Communications. One of the goals of his administration was to reinforce the National Broadband Plan. In January 2015, in the ministerial reform of the transition for Dilma's second term, Ricardo Berzoini assumed Bernardo's seat.

== Controversies ==
=== Operation Car Wash ===
In March 2016, he was indicted by the Federal Police for passive corruption in Car Wash.

=== Prison ===
He was arrested during one of the offshoots of Operation Car Wash, entitled Operation Brazil Cost of the Federal Police on 23 June 2016, being released a week later, on 29 June 2016, by Supreme Federal Court Justice Dias Toffoli, who considered the prison a "blatant illegal constraint". Bernardo is the main suspect in the involvement of embezzlement of public resources in the Ministry of Planning. Paulo Bernardo, according to the investigations, was connect to a bribery payment regarding contracts of services provision of computing by the company Consist by the cost of R$ 100 million (US$ 30,058,011.96 in 2015), between 2010 and 2015, emblezzed from federal government employees who did a payroll loan.

On 1 August 2016, he was charged by the Federal Public Prosecutor's Office (MPF) for the crimes of criminal organization, passive corruption and money laundering, along with other 19 people. Paulo Bernardo is accused of receiving resources from a fraud scheme in the contract of management of payroll loans in the Ministry of Planning. On 4 August, the Federal Justice accepted the MPF complaint and Paulo Bernardo became a defendant, accused of frauding a service of payroll loans to government employees.

=== Defendant in the Supreme Court ===
On 27 September 2016, he became a defendant from another lawsuit in the Supreme Federal Court. The Second Group of the Supreme Court unanimously accepted the complaint presented by the Prosecutor-General of the Republic against Paulo Bernardo and his then wife Gleisi Hoffmann in Operation Car Wash.

Political offices
Preceded by Nelson Machado	Minister of Planning, Budget and Management; 2005–2011	Succeeded by Miriam Belchior
Preceded by José Artur Filardi	Minister of Communications; 2011–2014	Succeeded by Ricardo Berzoini
