= Djalma Bastos de Morais =

Brazilian engineer and politician (1937–2020)

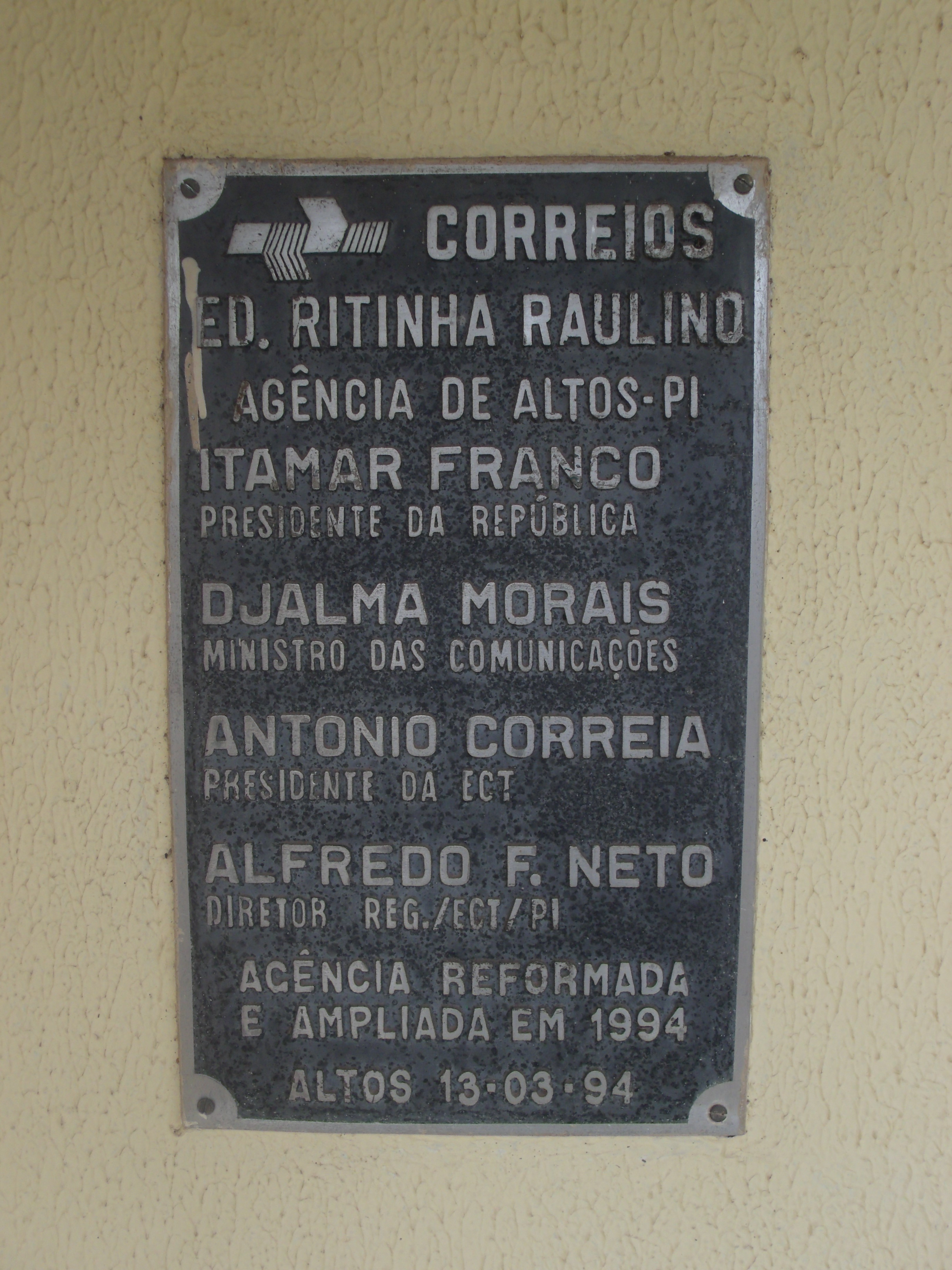
Sign for the Post Office Branch in Altos, Piauí.

Djalma Bastos de Morais (16 March 1937 – 25 December 2020) was a Brazilian engineer and politician who served as Federal Minister of Communications.

Morais was born in Maceió, Alagoas and moved, in his teens, to Barbacena, Minas Gerais. In 1960 he became an army officer at Academia Militar das Agulhas Negras at Resende and, in 1966, graduated in engineering from the Instituto Militar de Engenharia in Rio de Janeiro.

From 1990 he was president of TELEMIG, the state-owned telecoms monopoly in Minas Gerais, until 1993. On 23 December 1993 he was appointed Minister of Communications in the Federal government under president Itamar Franco, and served until 1 January 1995. He later became president of Companhia Energética de Minas Gerais (CEMIG), the power generator and distributor based in Belo Horizonte.

He died of COVID-19 on 25 December 2020, in Rio de Janeiro during the COVID-19 pandemic in Brazil.
