= BANCOOP case =

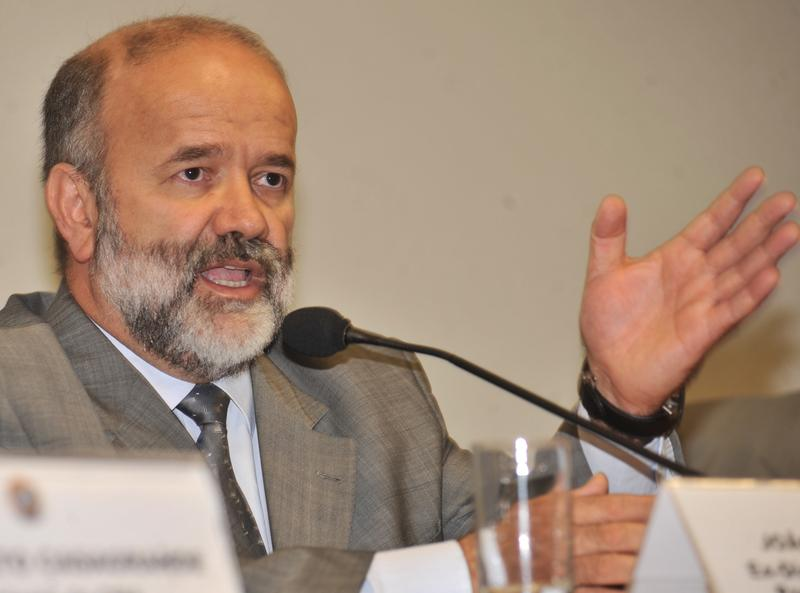
João Vaccari Neto was one of the principal players in the scandal.João Vaccari Neto.

The BANCOOP case is the name used by the Brazilian press for the alleged use of BANCOOP (Housing Cooperative Bank of São Paulo) to benefit the slush funds of the Workers Party (PT), in 2002 and 2004. On October 28, 2010, Judge Patricia Inigo Funes e Silva, of the 5th Criminal Court of São Paulo, accepted the complaint against João Vaccari Neto and five other people involved in the case of embezzlement through BANCOOP.

== Background ==
Founded in 1996, by Representative Ricardo Berzoini (former president of the Workers Party), BANCOOP had been investigated by prosecutors since 2007 for money laundering, overpricing and diversion of resources. The financial situation of the company provided evidence of the malpractice.

BANCOOP was one of the largest real estate developers in the state of São Paulo, with more than 15,000 members, and even received large financial contributions totaling more than R$40 million, since 2003, mostly through pension funds controlled by people linked to the PT. By 2010, it was estimated to have a deficit of more than R$100 million.

== Case ==
=== Slush fund for the Worker's Party ===
On March 10, 2010, the magazine Veja revealed that the Public Ministry of São Paulo reportedly had access to more than 8,000 pages of bank records of transactions carried out by BANCOOP between 2001 and 2008.

According to the publication, in 2002, contractors providing services to BANCOOP issued false invoices. The directors of the contracting companies then received payments for nonexistent services, and transferred the money to an employee in the Hélio Malheiro, who would then deposit this money at a branch of a major bank. During this time, the organization's president, Luiz Malheiro, gave the money to the union chair, João Vaccari Neto. The embezzled money was used in the slush fund for Lula's campaign in 2002.

In his statement made to the Public Ministry, the engineer responsible for the works of BANCOOP, Ricardo Luiz do Carmo, stated that he went to the union headquarters where he was instructed to collect money from contractors who provided services for BANCOOP, for the Workers Party campaign in 2002.

In one of the cases, a business called Mirante/Mizu Artifacts provided concrete blocks to its sole customer, BANCOOP. In the first three months of operation, the company received R$900 million. Among the leaders of Mirante/Mizu were four directors of BANCOOP, including the then-president of the cooperative Luiz Malheiros. Luiz authorized deposits to the company's account, which had an account at the same branch as the cooperative. The prosecutors suspected that the cooperative used a network of companies contracted to supply the slush funds of the Workers Party in the 2002 election and for the enrichment of the cooperative leaders. Mirante/Mizu is one such company. In only the first five months of its existence, Mizu received more than R$1 million from BANCOOP. Some of the suspicious activities included R$432,000 in donations to the Workers Party, R$162,000 in the purchasing of apartments for BANCOOP, R$153,000 in profit-sharing, and R$27,000 injected into an NGO owned by Malheiros. In his testimony Ricardo Luiz Carmo claims to have seen an invoice in the amount of R$500,000 to Mizu for consultant work on a civil construction project. This fact surprised Ricardo because the contractors actually received much less.

In another case, the businessman Andi Gurczynska Roberto, who worked as security for the directors of BANCOOP, said in testimony to the CPI that BANCOOP had been sending notes to entities, in exchange for receiving 10X that value in the entities' accounts. The difference was caught and handed over to the then-president of the cooperative Luis Malheiro, and the other directors. According to Roberto, "It was commonly said that (the money) went to the PT."

In 2004, Luiz Malheiro sought Ricardo Berzoini, the then-labor minister, to explain that the cooperative was in need of additional financial resources. In December of that year, Using the brokerage firm Planner, the cooperative raised R$36.9 million from state pension funds.

=== Overpricing and Favoritism from the Directors ===
According to the publication, in a small sampling of the cooperative's bank, there were cash withdrawals totaling R$31 million through checks issued by the cooperative itself, which showed a receipt by the cooperative or its own bank. The use of checks in this type of transaction is often used to hide the destination of the money. In other checks, R$10 million, between 2003 and 2005, was provided to four directors of the cooperative (the former president Luiz Eduardo Malheiro and former directors Alessandro Robson Bernardino, Marcelo Rinaldo and Tomas Edson Botelho Frag). The first three directors were killed in a car accident. The four were owners a firm called The Germany Empreiteira, whose sole client was the cooperative.

In the publication, the engineer Ricardo Luiz do Carmo, who was responsible for all construction of BANCOOP, stated that the notes, used by Germany Empreiteira, sent to BANCOOP, were overpriced by 20%.

Another person who received BANCOOP checks was Freud Godoy, the former security of President Lula's campaign, who received eleven checks totaling R$1.5 million, dating from the period 2005-2006. The checks were destined to Case Security Systems company, but the address only had a plaque with the firms name, and neighbors said that there was no indication that there was any activity there.

=== Those Injured by BANCOOP ===
According to the lawyer Vernon Picazio Junior, about 8,500 families have suffered losses due to BANCOOP. Included that number are the injured families, or about 3,000 families, who arrived to receive the supposedly constructed buildings by BANCOOP. According to him, there has been no clarification of a fund of R$43 million, which was raised from the members for the purpose of constructing those buildings.

== Consequences ==
In the period that BANCOOP functioned, there was a deficit of R$135 million, with 2000 affiliates who had paid for property but had not yet received it.[6]

On October 19, 2010, Jose Carlos Blat, the Public Prosecutor of the state of São Paulo, presented a complaint to the 5th Criminal Court, accusing the former directors of the cooperative (João Vaccari Neto, Tomas Edson Botelho Fraga, Ana Maria Ernica, Henir de Oliveira, BANCOOP's lawyer, Leticia Achur Antonio and Helena Conceição Pereira Lage, the president of Germany Empreiteira) of larceny, attempted larceny, conspiracy, misrepresentation, and money laundering. On October 28, 2010, Judge Patricia Inigo Funes e Silva of the 5th Criminal Court of São Paulo accepted the complaint. In addition, the judge ordered disclosure of the banking and financial records of Vaccari and Ana Maria.[1]

On February 21, 2011, the Court of São Paulo decided to garnish the cooperative's headquarters. The decision was made as a way to try and pay the debts of the cooperative.

On March 13, 2012, in a unanimous decision, the 10th Private Law Chamber of the State Court of Justice ruled to pierce the corporate veil of BANCOOP, which in practice forces its leaders and former representatives (Ricardo Berzoini and Joao Vaccari Neto) to reimburse the cooperative in the amount relating to the damages that were suffered.

Justice of São Paulo summarily dismissed charged against former PT treasurer and member João Vaccari Neto and other defendants. According to judge Maria Priscilla Ernandes Veiga Oliveira, of 4ª Vara Criminal de São Paulo, prosecution charges were based on mere allegations, presented in a superficial way.
