= Ministry of Communications (Brazil) =

Federal ministry in Brazil

- Portuguese: Ministério das Comunicações

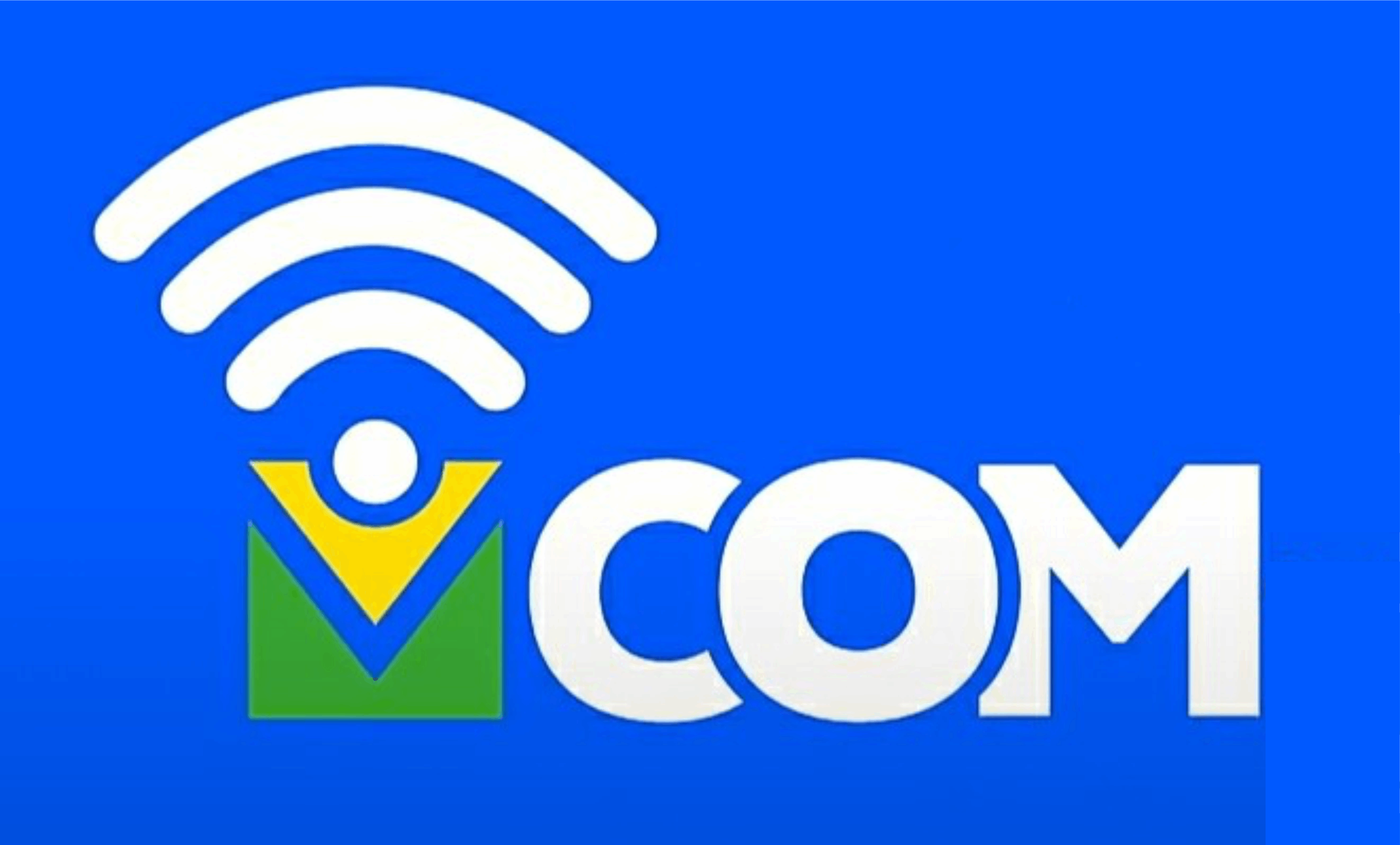

Agency overview
- Formed: 25 February 1967; 59 years ago
- Type: Ministry
- Jurisdiction: Federal government of Brazil
- Headquarters: Esplanada dos Ministérios, Bloco R Brasília, Federal District
- Annual budget: $1.64 b BRL (2023)
- Agency executives: Frederico Siqueira, Minister; Sônia Faustino, Executive-Secretary; Wilson Wellisch, Secretary of Electronic Social Communication; Maximiliano Martinhão, Secretary of Telecommunications; Carlos Baigorri, President of the National Telecommunications Agency; Fabiano Silva dos Santos, President of Correios; Vacant, President of Telebrás
- Website: www.gov.br/mcom/

The Ministry of Communications (Portuguese: Ministério das Comunicações) is a cabinet-level federal ministry in Brazil.

== History ==
=== 2016 dissolution ===
In May 2016, then president Michel Temer dissolved the Ministry, which became part of the Ministry of Science, Technology, Innovation and Communication, Portuguese: Ministério da Ciência, Tecnolgia, Inovação e Comunicações, abbreviated MCTIC). Before the Ministry's dissolution in 2016, the last Minister of Communications was André Figueiredo.

=== 2020 restoration ===
On 10 June 2020, president Jair Bolsonaro restored the Ministry, making Fábio Faria the Minister of Communications. Currently, the office is held by former Telebras president Frederico Siqueira.

== Structure ==
The Ministry of Communications has the following structure:

- Ministry of Communications
  - Minister's Office
  - Legal Consulting
  - Executive Secretariat
    - Undersecretariat of Planning, Budget and Administration
    - Subsecretariat of Postal Services and Governance of Related Companies
  - Special Secretariat for Social Communication
  - Broadcasting Secretariat
  - Secretariat of Telecommunications

The four entities that are linked to the Ministry of Communications are:

- National Telecommunications Agency (Anatel)
- Brazilian Post and Telegraph Company (Correios)
- Brazilian Telecommunications (Telebras)

== List of ministers ==
| No. | Portrait | Minister | Took office | Left office | Time in office | Party | President |
|---|---|---|---|---|---|---|---|
| 1 | Carlos Furtado de Simas | Carlos Furtado de Simas (1913–1978) | 15 March 1967 | 30 October 1969 | 2 years, 229 days | Independent | Artur da Costa e Silva (ARENA); Military Junta of 1969 (Military junta) |
| 2 | Hygino Caetano Corsetti | Hygino Caetano Corsetti (1919–2004) | 30 October 1969 | 15 March 1974 | 4 years, 136 days | Independent | Emílio Garrastazu Médici (ARENA) |
| 3 | Euclides Quandt de Oliveira | Euclides Quandt de Oliveira (1919–2013) | 15 March 1974 | 15 March 1979 | 5 years, 0 days | Independent | Ernesto Geisel (ARENA) |
| 4 | Haroldo Corrêa de Mattos | Haroldo Corrêa de Mattos (1923–1994) | 15 March 1979 | 15 March 1985 | 6 years, 0 days | Independent | João Figueiredo (PDS) |
| 5 | Antônio Carlos Magalhães | Antônio Carlos Magalhães (1927–2007) | 15 March 1985 | 15 March 1990 | 5 years, 0 days | PFL | José Sarney (MDB) |
| 6 | Hugo Napoleão Neto | Hugo Napoleão Neto (born 1943) | 19 October 1992 | 23 December 1993 | 1 year, 65 days | PFL | Itamar Franco (MDB) |
| 7 | Djalma Bastos de Morais | Djalma Bastos de Morais (1937–2020) | 23 December 1993 | 1 January 1995 | 32 years, 291 days | Independent | Itamar Franco (MDB) |
| 8 | Sérgio Motta | Sérgio Motta (1940–1998) | 1 January 1995 | 19 April 1998 | 3 years, 108 days | PSDB | Fernando Henrique Cardoso (PSDB) |
| 9 | Luiz Carlos Mendonça de Barros | Luiz Carlos Mendonça de Barros (born 1943) | 30 April 1998 | 1 January 1999 | 246 days | Independent | Fernando Henrique Cardoso (PSDB) |
| 10 | Pimenta da Veiga | Pimenta da Veiga (born 1947) | 1 January 1999 | 2 April 2002 | 3 years, 91 days | PSDB | Fernando Henrique Cardoso (PSDB) |
| 11 | Juarez Quadros | Juarez Quadros (born 1944) | 2 April 2002 | 1 January 2003 | 274 days | Independent | Fernando Henrique Cardoso (PSDB) |
| 12 | Miro Teixeira | Miro Teixeira (born 1945) | 1 January 2003 | 1 January 2004 | 1 year, 0 days | PDT | Luiz Inácio Lula da Silva (PT) |
| 13 | Eunício Oliveira | Eunício Oliveira (born 1952) | 23 January 2004 | 8 July 2005 | 1 year, 166 days | MDB | Luiz Inácio Lula da Silva (PT) |
| 14 | Hélio Costa | Hélio Costa (born 1939) | 8 July 2005 | 1 April 2010 | 4 years, 267 days | MDB | Luiz Inácio Lula da Silva (PT) |
| 15 | José Artur Filardi | José Artur Filardi (born 1959) | 1 April 2010 | 1 January 2011 | 275 days | MDB | Luiz Inácio Lula da Silva (PT) |
| 16 | Paulo Bernardo | Paulo Bernardo (born 1952) | 1 January 2011 | 1 January 2015 | 4 years, 0 days | PT | Dilma Rousseff (PT) |
| 17 | Ricardo Berzoini | Ricardo Berzoini (born 1960) | 1 January 2015 | 2 October 2015 | 274 days | PT | Dilma Rousseff (PT) |
| 18 | André Figueiredo | André Figueiredo (born 1966) | 2 October 2015 | 12 May 2016 | 223 days | PDT | Dilma Rousseff (PT) |
| 19 | Fábio Faria | Fábio Faria (born 1977) | 17 June 2020 | 21 December 2022 | 2 years, 187 days | PP | Jair Bolsonaro (PL) |
| 20 | Juscelino Filho | Juscelino Filho (born 1984) | 1 January 2023 | 8 April 2025 | 2 years, 97 days | UNIÃO | Luiz Inácio Lula da Silva (PT) |
| 21 | Frederico Siqueira | Frederico Siqueira (born 24.04.2025 - Posse de Frederico de Siqueira Filho como Ministro de Estado das Comunicações (54472591392) (cropped).jpg) | 24 April 2025 | Incumbent | 1 year, 169 days | Independent | Luiz Inácio Lula da Silva (PT) |

== See also ==
- Other ministries of Communications
