= Alessandro Molon =

Brazilian teacher and politician

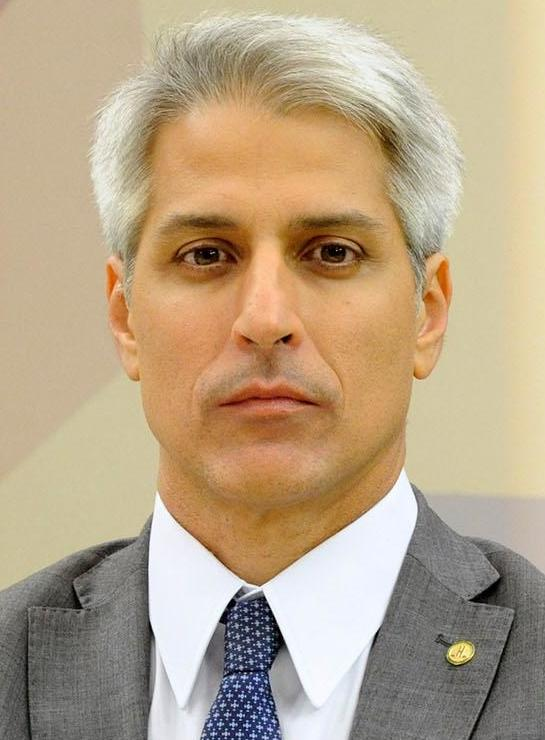

Member of the Chamber of Deputies
- In office 1 February 2011 – 1 February 2023
- Constituency: Rio de Janeiro

Chamber PSB Leader
- In office 19 February 2020 – 2 February 2021
- Preceded by: Tadeu Alencar
- Succeeded by: Danilo Cabral

Chamber Opposition Leader
- In office 25 March 2021 – 16 February 2022
- Preceded by: André Figueiredo
- Succeeded by: Wolney Queiroz
- In office 19 February 2019 – 11 March 2020
- Preceded by: José Guimarães
- Succeeded by: André Figueiredo

State Deputy of Rio de Janeiro
- In office 1 February 2003 – 1 February 2011
- Constituency: At-large

Personal details
- Born: Alessandro Lucciola Molon; 28 October 1971 (age 54) Belo Horizonte, Minas Gerais, Brazil
- Party: PSB (2018–present)
- Other political affiliations: PT (1999–2015); REDE (2015–18)
- Spouse: Clarisse Molon
- Children: 3
- Education: Fluminense Federal University; Pontifical Catholic University of Rio de Janeiro
- Occupation: Broadcaster; historian; lawyer; politician; professor

Alessandro Lucciola Molon (28 October 1971) is a Brazilian politician and professor, member of the Brazilian Socialist Party (PSB) and former Leader of the Opposition in the Chamber of Deputies. He was the rapporteur to Brazil's Bill of Rights for the Internet (Marco Civil da Internet), ensuring net neutrality, privacy protection and freedom of expression online.

== Biography ==
Alessandro Molon was born in Belo Horizonte, Minas Gerais, but was raised in Rio de Janeiro, where he lives.

He holds a bachelor's and a master's degree in history from Universidade Federal Fluminense (UFF) and a bachelor's degree in law from the Pontifical Catholic University of Rio de Janeiro (PUC-Rio). He is currently concluding his doctorate at Universidade Estadual do Rio de Janeiro (UERJ).

Molon has also taught in public and private schools in Rio de Janeiro, before beginning his political career. He currently teaches Law students at PUC-Rio.

== Political career ==
After experiencing the tough educational scenario in Brazil as a teacher, Molon decided to pursue a political career in order to make more impactful changes, with a focus on combating the country's abyssal inequalities. In 2002, he was elected for his first term as state deputy in the Legislative Assembly of the Rio de Janeiro State (Alerj), being reelected in 2006. In this period, he was president of Alerj's Human Rights Commission and Culture Commission, and was known for his opposition to controversial political figures such as Jorge Picciani and Sérgio Cabral, who are now in prison.

In 2010, Molon was elected federal deputy in the Brazilian Chamber of Deputies. In his first term, he reported and approved the Marco Civil da Internet (Free Internet Law). He also managed to update the Brazilian Constitution to guarantee access to justice for all, through the Public Defender's Office amendment.

In 2014, Molon was reelected for his second term as federal deputy. Molon was the main articulator of the process that dismissed the former deputy and President of the Chamber of Deputies, Eduardo Cunha, who was later charged with corruption and imprisoned. Alessandro Molon was also a strong voice against president Michel Temer's government. In his second term, Molon became known for his work in defense of climate protection as President of the Environment Parliamentary Group.

In 2018, Molon was reelected federal deputy for a third term, with the third largest number of votes in the State of Rio de Janeiro. In 2019, he was appointed Leader of the Opposition to president Jair Bolsonaro’s government. Molon also articulated and ensured the approval of a project of his authorship that removes firearms of those who commit violence against women.

Molon ran for Mayor of Rio de Janeiro in 2008 and 2016.

Chamber of Deputies (Brazil)
Preceded by José Guimarães	Chamber Opposition Leader; 2019–20; 2021–22	Succeeded by André Figueiredo
Preceded by André Figueiredo	Chamber Opposition Leader; 2019–20; 2021–22	Succeeded by Wolney Queiroz
Preceded by Tadeu Alencar	Chamber PSB Leader; 2020–21	Succeeded by Danilo Cabral
Party political offices
Preceded by Jorge Bittar	PT nominee for Mayor of Rio de Janeiro; 2008	Succeeded by Benedita da Silva
New political party	REDE nominee for Mayor of Rio de Janeiro; 2016	Succeeded by Eduardo Bandeira de Mello
