= Juscelino Filho =

Brazilian politician

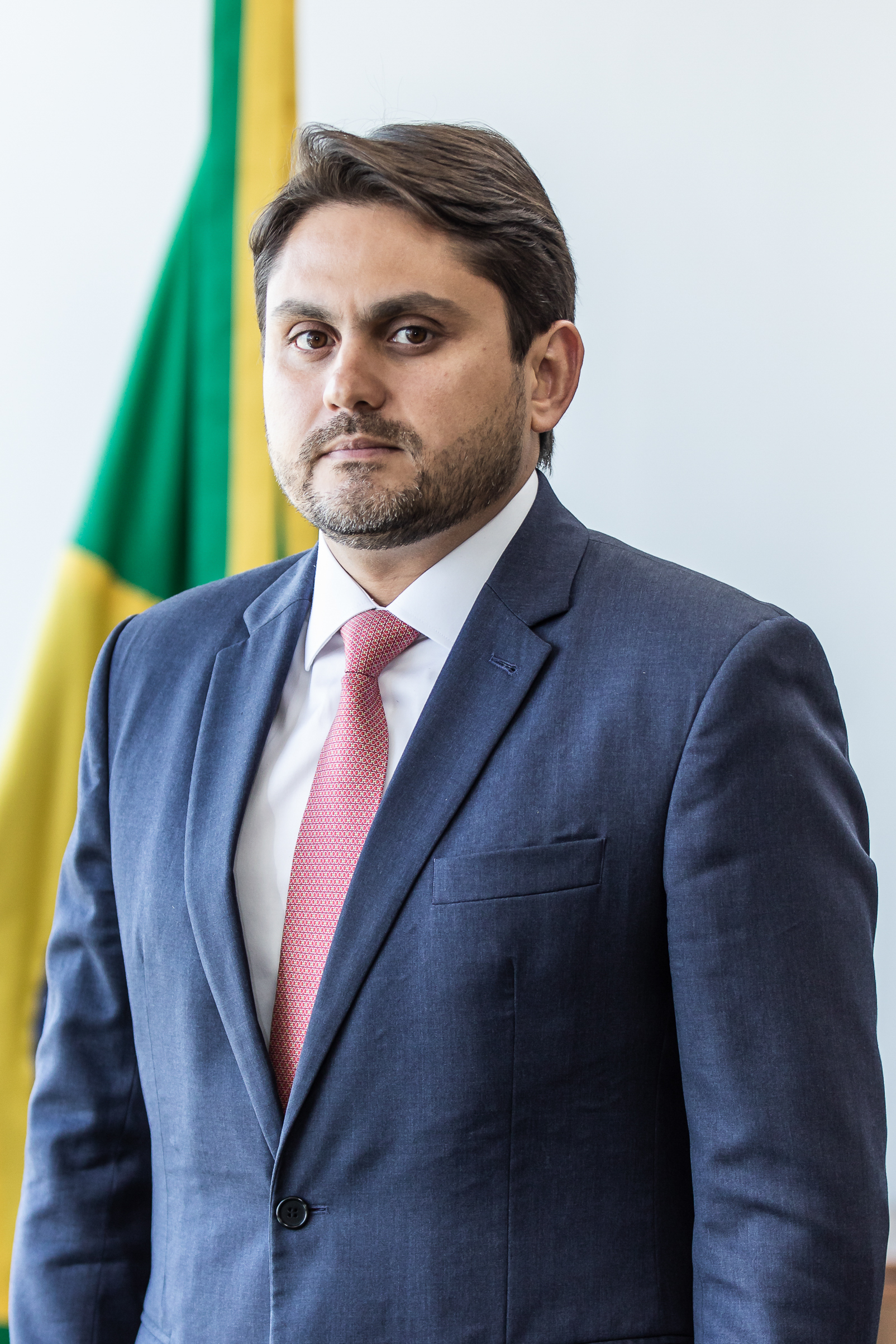

Member of the Chamber of Deputies
- Incumbent
- Assumed office 1 February 2015
- Constituency: Maranhão

Minister of Communications
- In office 1 January 2023 – 8 April 2025
- President: Luiz Inácio Lula da Silva
- Preceded by: Fábio Faria
- Succeeded by: Frederico Siqueira

Personal details
- Born: José Juscelino dos Santos Rezende Filho; 6 November 1984 (age 42) São Luís, Maranhão, Brazil
- Party: PSDB (1997–2000, 2026–present)
- Other political affiliations: DEM (2000–2013, 2016–2022); PRP (2013–2015); PMB (2015–2016); UNIÃO (2022–2026)
- Profession: Physician

José Juscelino dos Santos Rezende Filho (born 6 November 1984) is a Brazilian physician and politician who had served as Minister of Communications in the cabinet of President Luiz Inácio Lula da Silva from 2023 to 2025. Affiliated with the Brazilian Social Democracy Party (PSDB), he has served as a federal deputy for Maranhão since 2015.

== Early life and education ==
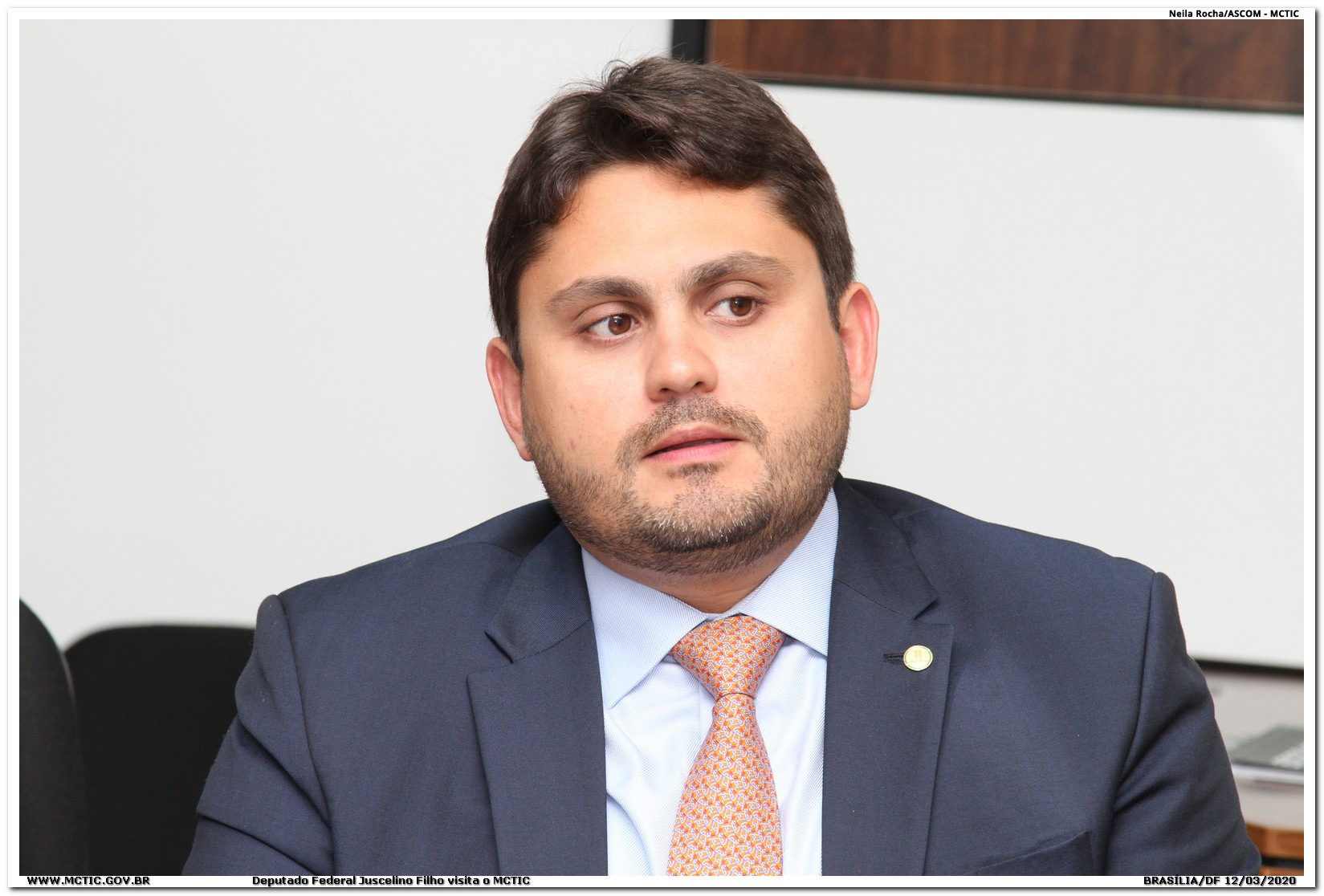
Filho in 2020

Born in São Luís, the capital of Maranhão, Juscelino is the son of former state deputy Juscelino Rezende. He received a degree in medicine from the University Center of Maranhão (UNICEUMA) in 2010.

== Career ==
As a doctor, Filho is specialized in radiology and diagnostic imaging. He formerly served as an assistant secretary in the Maranhão government.

=== Federal Deputy from Maranhão ===
In 2014, Juscelino Filho was elected federal deputy from Maranhão. On 17 April 2016, he voted in favor of impeaching President Dilma Rousseff. In April 2017, he voted in favor of labor reform.

=== Minister of Communications ===
In December 2022, it was announced that he would serve as Minister of Communications in the second Lula Cabinet. He resigned on 8 April 2025 after charges of corruption were filed against him over the misuse of public funds in a road paving project in Maranhão when he was a federal deputy.

Political offices
Preceded by Fábio Faria	Minister of Communications; 2023–2025	Succeeded by Frederico Siqueira
