= Ministry of Science, Technology, Innovation and Communications (Brazil) =

Ministry of Communications (Brazil)
Ministry overview
- Formed: 25 February 1967; 59 years ago 10 June 2020; 6 years ago (revival)
- Dissolved: May 2016; 10 years ago
- Headquarters: Brasília, Distrito Federal
- Annual budget: R$ 9,736 billion (including investment budget - R$ 35,7 million) (2015)
- Minister responsible: Frederico Siqueira
- Website: www.mcti.gov.br

The Ministry of Communications (MCom) (Portuguese: Ministério de Comunicações) is an agency of the Brazilian Executive Branch, whose duties are to regulate broadcasting, postal, and telecommunications services and their related entities, as well as to manage national policies in related areas such as digital inclusion.

It was created by Decree-Law No. 200/1967 of February 25, 1967, sanctioned by then-President Humberto Castelo Branco. The Minister of Communications, who heads the ministry, is appointed by the President of Brazil.

The patron of the Ministry of Communications was Marshal Rondon, who led the construction of telegraph lines in the Midwest and North regions between the late 19th and early 20th centuries.

It was dissolved in 2016, but was relaunched in June 2020.

Frederico de Siqueira Filho is the current minister and took office on April 24, 2025.

== See also ==
- Ministry of Science, Technology and Innovation (Brazil)
- Other ministries of Communications
