= Fábio Faria (politician) =

Brazilian politician

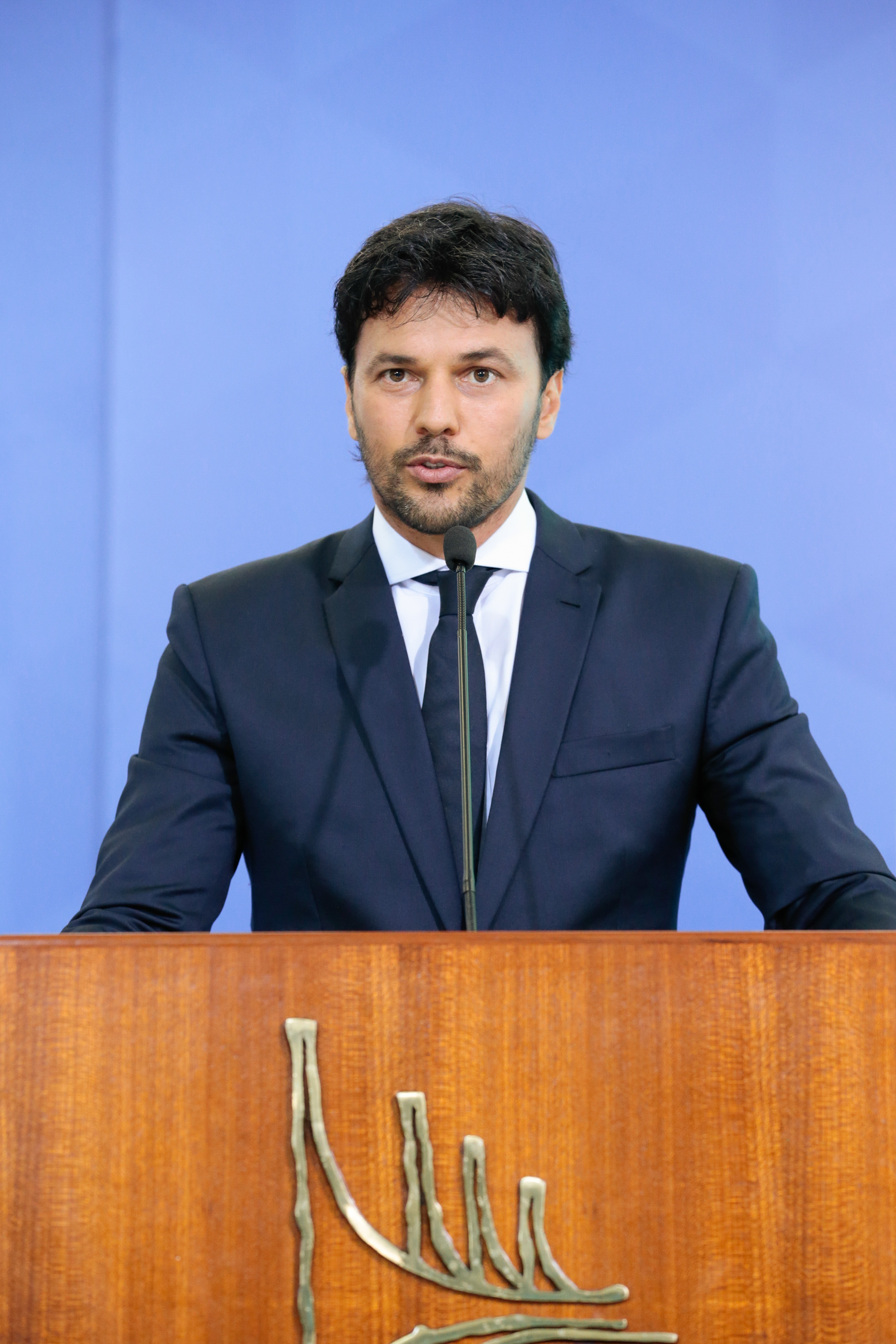

Minister of Communications
- In office 11 June 2020 – 21 December 2022
- President: Jair Bolsonaro
- Preceded by: André Figueiredo
- Succeeded by: Juscelino Filho

Federal Deputy from Rio Grande do Norte
- In office 1 February 2007 – 11 June 2020

Personal details
- Born: Fábio Salustino Mesquita de Faria; 1 September 1977 (age 49) Natal, Rio Grande do Norte, Brazil
- Party: PP (2022–present)
- Other political affiliations: PMN (2005–11); PSD (2011–22)
- Spouse: Patricia Abravanel (m. 2017)
- Children: Pedro (b. 2015); Jane (b. 2018); Senor (b. 2019)
- Parents: Robinson Faria (father); Maria Nina Salustino (mother)
- Education: Potiguar University
- Occupation: Senior relationship manager at BTG Pactual
- Profession: Politician
- Website: www.fabiofaria.com.br

Fábio Salustino Mesquita de Faria (born 1 September 1977) is a Brazilian politician who served as Minister of Communications under the Jair Bolsonaro government. Member of the Social Democratic Party (PSD), Faria was Federal Deputy representing the state of Rio Grande do Norte. He is son of Robinson Faria, former Governor of Rio Grande do Norte, and married to TV presenter Patricia Abravanel. Following the end of Bolsonaro's government, he was hired as senior relationship manager at BTG Pactual bank in January 2023.

== Political career ==
With a political base in his home state, rose to the National Congress before turning 30-years-old. He was elect in 2006 for his first term as Federal Deputy, with 195,148 votes, which represented 12.02% of the valid votes for this position, being the most votes of the 8 representatives of the state.

Fábio Faria lead his party caucus between February and September 2008, period when he was Vice-Leader of the joint bloc composed by Brazilian Socialist Party (PSB), Democratic Labour Party (PDT), Communist Party of Brazil (PCdoB), Party of National Mobilization (PMN) and Brazilian Republican Party (PRB).

In 2013, he was elect 2nd Vice President of the Chamber of Deputies, house which he presided temporarily for 13 days.

=== Minister of Communications ===
On 10 June 2020, President Jair Bolsonaro announced, through his social media, the recreation of the Ministry of Communications and nominated Fábio Faria as the new head of the office.

== Personal life ==
Graduated in Company Administration for the Potiguar University (UnP), he is son of Robinson Faria, former Governor, and Maria Nina Salustino.

Fábio is married to TV presenter Patricia Abravanel, whom he had three children: Pedro, Jane and Senor, name giving as a tribute to his famous father-in-law, Silvio Santos (Senor Abravanel). Before his marriage, Faria dated actress Priscila Fantin, TV presenter Adriane Galisteu, and model, TV presenter and former Big Brother Brasil housemate Sabrina Sato.

== Controversies ==
In 2009, during the "Air tickets scandal", Faria refunded R$ 21,000 to the Chamber of Deputies, as he used it as part of his parliamentary quota of air tickets he had the right to use to gift his then girlfriend Adriane Galisteu, her mother Emma Galisteu, and the artists Kayky Brito, Sthefany Brito, Samara Felippo, Marcelo Serrado, Marcello Novaes, Maiz Oliveira (niece of Luma de Oliveira), singer Fabio Mondega, stylist Yan Acioli, jeweler Roseli Duque and Galisteu's press secretary Nelson Sacho between 2007 and 2008. Other artists like Priscila Fantim (Faria's former girlfriend), Preta Gil, Deborah Secco and Fábio Assunção had their tickets issued, but they were cancelled before being used. Until the scandal reveal, the "benefited" people were not aware that their expenses were being paid by the Chamber of Deputies.

Political offices
Preceded by André Figueiredo (2016)	Minister of Communications; 2020–2022	Succeeded by Juscelino Filho
