= Ricardo Berzoini =

Brazilian unionist and politician (born 1960)

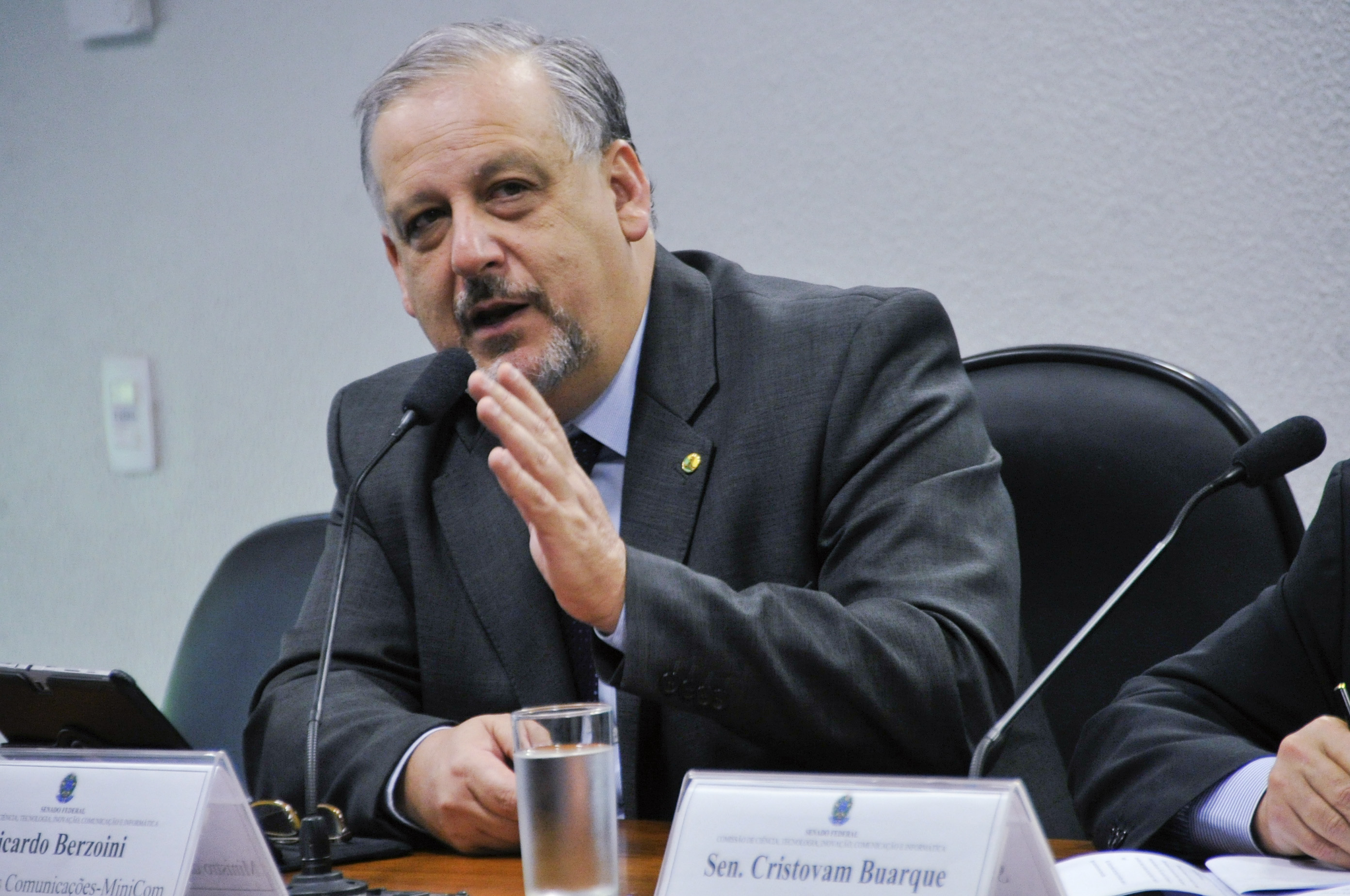
- Ricardo Berzoini in 2016

Secretary of Government
- In office 2 October 2015 – 12 May 2016
- President: Dilma Rousseff
- Preceded by: Office established
- Succeeded by: Geddel Vieira Lima

Minister of Communications
- In office 1 January 2015 – 2 October 2015
- President: Dilma Rousseff
- Preceded by: Paulo Bernardo
- Succeeded by: André Figueiredo

Secretary of Institutional Affairs
- In office 1 April 2014 – 1 January 2015
- President: Dilma Rousseff
- Preceded by: Ideli Salvatti
- Succeeded by: Pepe Vargas

Federal Deputy from São Paulo
- In office 1 February 1999 – 1 February 2015

National President of the Workers' Party
- In office 11 October 2005 – 6 October 2006
- Preceded by: Tarso Genro
- Succeeded by: Marco Aurélio Garcia
- In office 2 February 2007 – 19 February 2010
- Preceded by: Marco Aurélio Garcia
- Succeeded by: José Eduardo Dutra

Minister of Labor and Employment
- In office 23 January 2004 – 12 July 2005
- President: Luiz Inácio Lula da Silva
- Preceded by: Jaques Wagner
- Succeeded by: Luiz Marinho

Minister of Social Security
- In office 1 January 2003 – 23 January 2004
- President: Luiz Inácio Lula da Silva
- Preceded by: José Cechin
- Succeeded by: Amir Lando

Personal details
- Born: Ricardo José Ribeiro Berzoini; 10 February 1960 (age 66) Juiz de Fora, Minas Gerais, Brazil
- Party: PT
- Spouse: Sônia Rodrigues

Ricardo José Ribeiro Berzoini (born 10 February 1960 in Juiz de Fora, Brazil) was the President of the Workers' Party of Brazil from 2005 to 2010. He has served as minister for social security.

From January 1, 2015, to October 2, 2015, he served as Minister of Communications.

Political offices
Preceded by José Cechin	Minister of Social Security; 2003–2004	Succeeded by Amir Lando
Preceded by Jaques Wagner	Minister of Labor and Employment; 2004–2005	Succeeded by Luiz Marinho
Preceded by Ideli Salvatti	Secretary of Institutional Affairs; 2014–2015	Succeeded by Pepe Vargas
Preceded by Paulo Bernardo	Minister of Communications; 2015	Succeeded by André Figueiredo
Office established	Secretary of Government; 2015–2016	Succeeded by Geddel Vieira Lima
Party political offices
Preceded by Tarso Genro	National President of the Workers' Party; 2005–2006; 2007–2010	Succeeded by Marco Aurélio Garcia
Preceded by Marco Aurélio Garcia	National President of the Workers' Party; 2005–2006; 2007–2010	Succeeded by José Eduardo Dutra
