= Paulo Delgado =

Brazilian politician

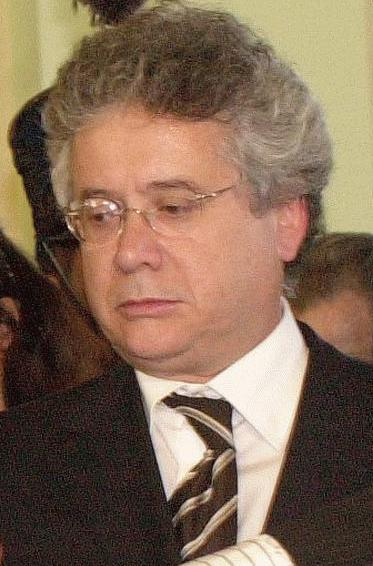
Paulo Delgado in 2003

Paulo Gabriel Godinho Delgado (born December 28, 1951) is a Brazilian sociologist.

Delgado is one of the founders of the Workers' Party (Partido dos Trabalhadores - PT). He was a Professor of Social Sciences at Universidade Federal de Juiz de Fora (UFJF). In the 1980s he served as Secretary of Organization of the Workers' Party immediately following the party's creation. Later, in the 2000s, he was the party's Secretary of International Relations.

In 1987 he was elected to the 1987–1988 Constituent Assembly that wrote the current Brazilian Constitution. From 1987 to 2011 he had six elected terms as representative to the National Congress of Brazil for the State of Minas Gerais.

While in the Brazilian National Congress he was, in different opportunities, the Chairman of the Chamber of Deputies Committee on Education and Culture, and Vice-Chairman of the Chamber of Deputies Committee on Foreign Relations and National Defense.

His work as a congressperson was also marked by sponsoring the bill that promoted deinstitutionalization in Brazilian Psychiatric treatment, changing the focus of the treatment from systematic hospitalization to community and open services in Centers of Psychosocial Attention.
