= André Figueiredo =

Brazilian politician and economist (born 1966)

Member of the Chamber of Deputies
- Incumbent
- Assumed office 12 May 2016
- Constituency: Ceará
- In office 6 January 2005 – 5 October 2015
- Constituency: Ceará

Minister of Communications
- In office 5 October 2015 – 12 May 2016
- President: Dilma Rousseff
- Preceded by: Ricardo Berzoini
- Succeeded by: Fábio Faria (2020)

Personal details
- Born: André Peixoto Figueiredo Lima; 10 November 1966 (age 59) Fortaleza, Ceará, Brazil
- Party: PDT (1984–present)
- Parents: Raimundo Figueiredo Lima (father); Maria Heloísa Peixoto (mother)
- Education: Federal University of Ceará; University of Fortaleza

André Peixoto Figueiredo Lima (born 10 November 1966) is a Brazilian lawyer, economist, entrepreneur and politician. He is a member of the Democratic Labor Party (PDT).

Born in Fortaleza, André Figueiredo has degrees in Economy (1987) and Law (1995) from the Federal University of Ceará (UFC), and a postgraduate degree in Foreign Trade from the University of Fortaleza (UNIFOR).

== Biography ==
He joined the Seed of Liberation Movement that used Paulo Freire's methodology to literate and form citizens in the neighborhood of Pirambu, in Fortaleza. Figueiredo was student leader, president of the Economy Academic Center and director of the UFC Students Central Directory, and president of the Economy Students National Executive.

In 1984, joined the Democratic Labor Party. Founded and was first president of the Ceará Socialist Youth. Later, became member of the party's National Directory, member of the Regional Executive, president of the Alberto Pasqualini Institute, national vice-president of the Leonel Brizola/Alberto Pasqualini Foundation and, currently, is the PDT National 1st vice-president.

André presided the Economists Union of Ceará in 1991 and, three years later, became subsecretary of Urban Development and Environment of Ceará.

He was elect federal deputy in 2014 for the 55th Legislature (2015–2019) by the PDT. On 2 October 2015, he was nominated by president Dilma Rousseff as successor of Ricardo Berzoini as Minister of Communications.

Back to the Chamber of Deputies, voted against the New Fiscal Regime proposal. In April 2017, voted against the Labor Reform. In August 2017, voted in favor of the process that asked for investigation of then president Michel Temer.

On 9 June 2022, Lewis Hamilton was made an honorary citizen of Brazil after André Figueiredo's proposal was passed in the Brazilian Chamber of Deputies.

Political offices
| Preceded by Ricardo Berzoini | Minister of Communications; 2015–2016 | Succeeded by Fábio Faria (2020) |
Chamber of Deputies (Brazil)
| Preceded by Alessandro Molon | Chamber Opposition Leader; 2020–2021 | Succeeded by Alessandro Molon |
| Preceded by Aguinaldo Ribeiro | Chamber Majority Leader; 2024–present | Incumbent |
