= João Vaccari Neto =

Brazilian banker and labor union leader

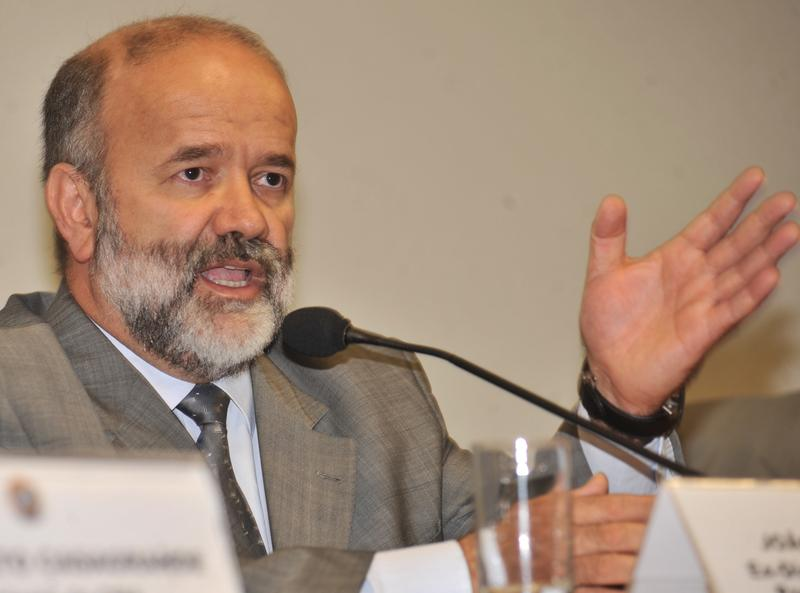
- João Vaccari Neto, former treasurer of Brazil's Worker's Party)
- Born: October 30, 1958 (age 67); São Paulo, Brazil
- Occupations: Banker and politician

João Vaccari Neto (born October 30, 1958, São Paulo) is a Brazilian banker and labor union leader. He is the Secretary of Finance and Planning of the Workers Party (PT) and was president of the cooperative known as BANCOOP (Housing Cooperative Bank of São Paulo). He is currently incarcerated in Pinhais near Curitiba.

== Life ==
Vaccari Neto was born in São Paulo. He is most widely recognized for his involvement in Brazilian political scandals. He has been accused of participating in and even leading the Mensalão scandal and the BANCOOP case. He was arrested, convicted, and imprisoned for his involvement in the Petrobras scandal called Operação Lava Jato.

He was also a member of the Board of Directors of Itaipu Binacional. In 2002, he was elected as an alternate senator for São Paulo on the ticket headed by Aloizio Mercadante.

== Conviction and incarceration ==
April 15, 2015 Vaccari was arrested for receiving "irregular donations" on behalf of the PT. On June 22, 2015 Vaccari was convicted of bribery, money laundering and criminal association, then sentenced to 15 years and four months in prison. He is incarcerated in the Complexo Médico-Penal prison in Pinhais near Curitiba. On June 27, 2017 the 8th panel of the federal court for the 4th region upheld his appeal of this conviction. Judge Sergio Moro, who had found him guilty in four other cases and sentenced him to a total of more than thirty years, had cited campaign donations to the PT from construction contractors that coincided very closely to successful bids on contracts with the state-owned oil company Petrobras.

Vaccari was convicted of passive corruption on May 18, 2016 and sentenced to nine years in prison. He was also charged with money laundering in that case but was acquitted on that count. Engineers Renato Duque and Pedro Barrusco were also implicated in the misallocation of R46,412,340, including R28 million in kickbacks. Moro found that although Vaccari did not himself receive the payment, his participation made it possible. Former minister José Dirceu and nine others were also found guilty. Dirceu was sentenced to 23 years and three months of imprisonment.
