= José Eduardo Dutra =

Brazilian businessman, geologist and politician

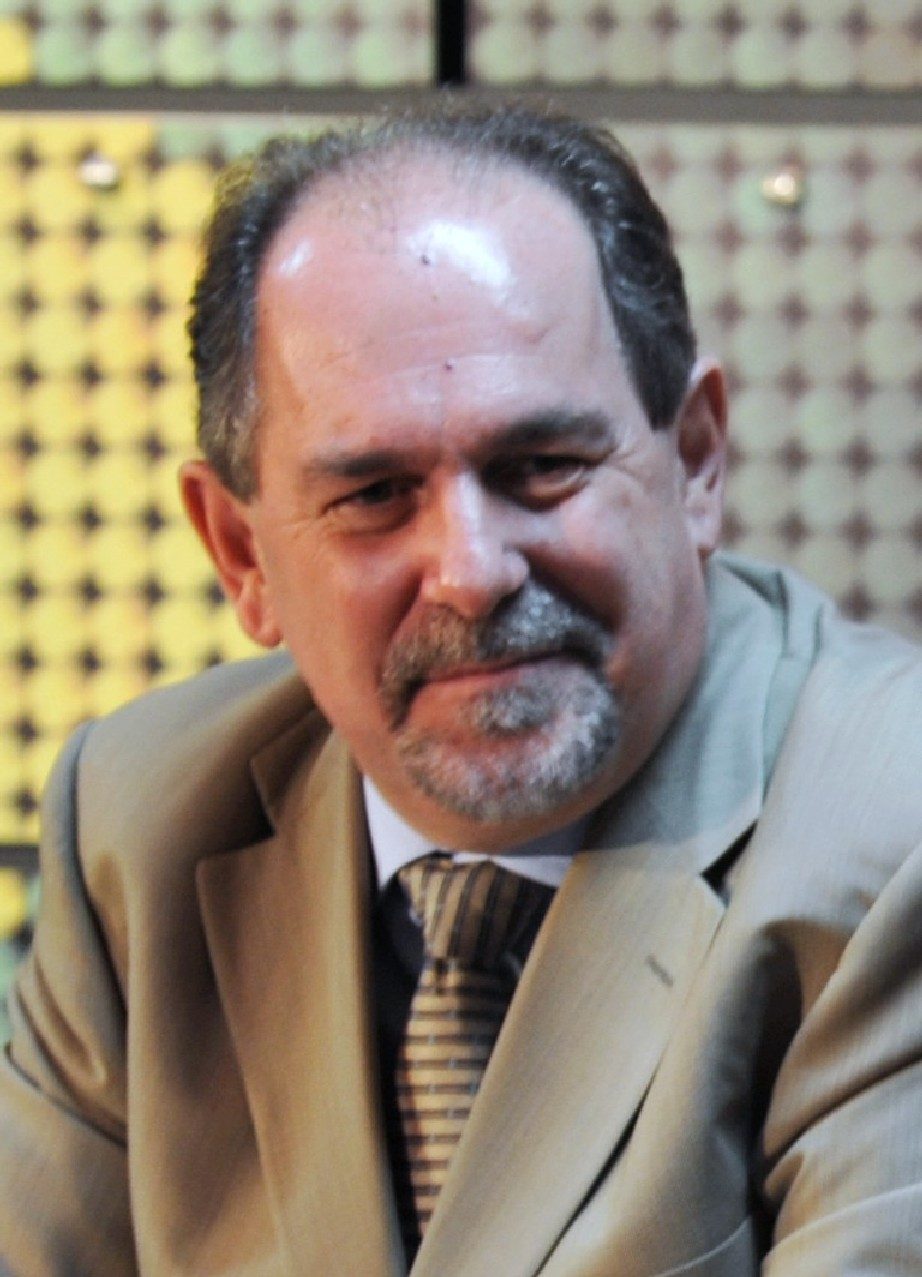
- Born: José Eduardo de Barros Dutra; 11 April 1957; Rio de Janeiro
- Died: 4 October 2015 (aged 58); Belo Horizonte
- Education: Universidade Federal Rural do Rio de Janeiro
- Occupation: Geologist
- Employer: Petrobras
- Political party: Workers' Party

José Eduardo de Barros Dutra (11 April 1957 – 4 October 2015) was a Brazilian businessman, geologist and politician. He joined Petrobras in 1983, and was CEO from 2003 to 2005. From 2007 to 2009, Dutra led the fuel distribution unit at Petrobras. He was elected president of the Workers' Party in 2009, then returned to the company in 2012. He was elected to the Federal Senate in 1994 and served until his death from cancer in 2015.
