= Marco Aurélio Garcia =

Brazilian politician (1941–2017)

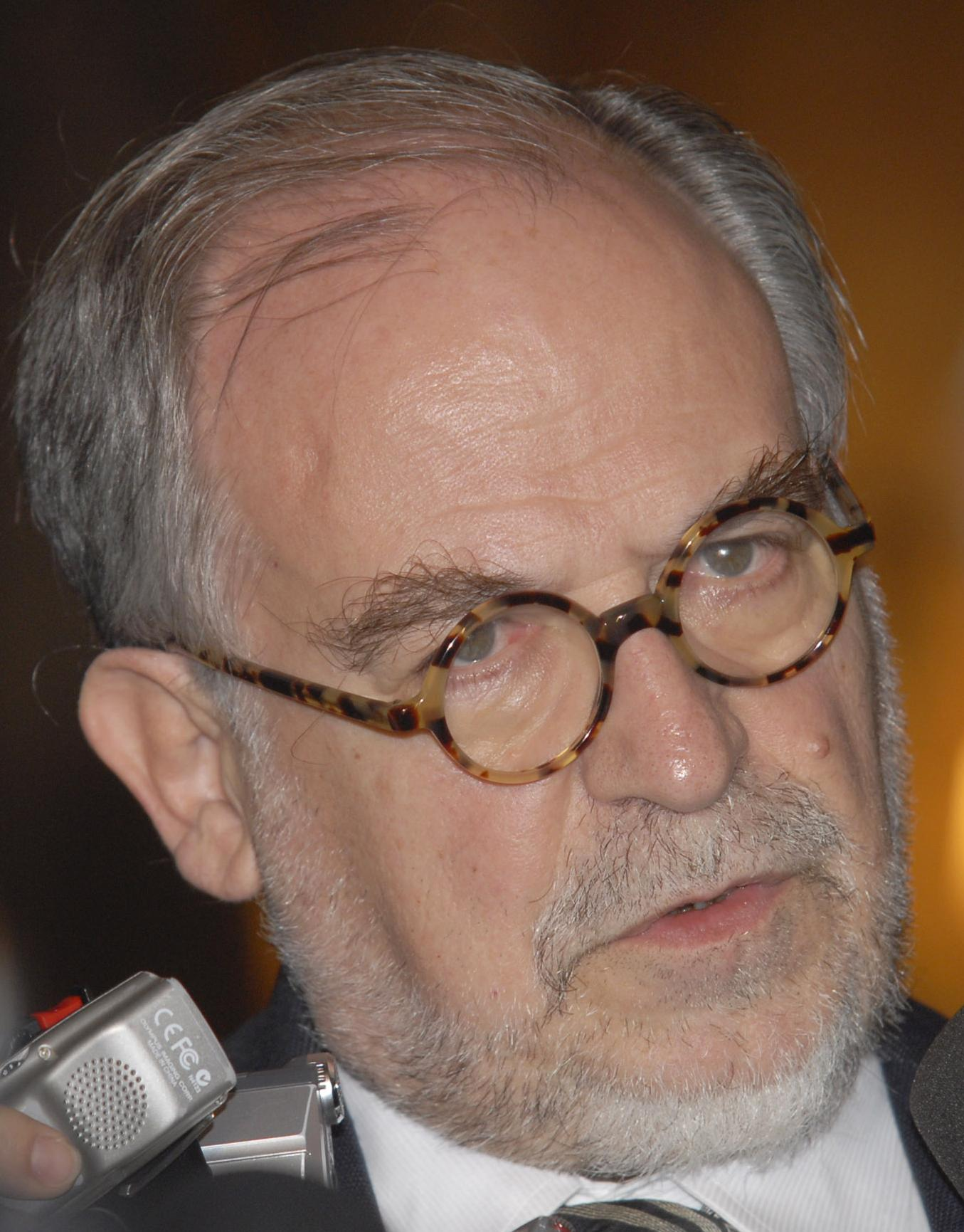

Foreign Policy Advisor to the President of Brazil
- In office 2006–2016

Personal details
- Born: 22 June 1941
- Died: 20 July 2017 (aged 76)
- Party: Worker's Party
- Profession: professor, politician

Marco Aurélio Garcia (22 June 1941 – 20 July 2017) was a Brazilian politician, as a member of the Workers' Party (Partido dos Trabalhadores). He was a professor of Latin American History on leave from UNICAMP University and a left idealist. He was previously professor at the Latin American Social Science Faculty of the University of Chile and of the Paris-VIII and Paris-X universities.

== Biography ==
Marco Aurélio Garcia studied at Júlio de Castilhos High School (Porto Alegre, Rio Grande do Sul), where he was active in the left student movement. He graduated from the Federal University of Rio Grande do Sul majoring in philosophy and law. In the 1960s, he was vice-president of the National Student Union and served as a Porto Alegre city councilman. Marco Aurélio Garcia was also known by his initials MAG, and was referred to as "The Professor" by his political colleagues.

Due to the military dictatorship, Garcia was self-exiled in Chile and France from 1970 to 1979. After the amnesty law was approved, he returned to Brazil and was among the principal leaders who created the Workers Party (Partido dos Trabalhadores – PT). In 1990, as Foreign Affairs Secretary of the PT, he was one of the organizers of the "São Paulo Forum" (Foro de São Paulo), which brought together all of the left groups in Latin America and the Caribbean. The "São Paulo Forum" continues to meet periodically at various Latin American venues, most recently in Caracas, Venezuela in 2019. Garcia also served as Secretary of Culture for both the cities of São Paulo and Campinas.

Garcia coordinated the drafting of President Luiz Inácio Lula da Silva's election platforms (or programs) for the 1994, 1998 and 2006 elections. He served as the PT'S interim party president from 6 October 2006 to 2 January 2007 and as vice-president from October 2005 to February 2010. In 2007, he became a special foreign policy adviser to President Lula and continued in that position with President Dilma Rousseff.

Marco Aurélio Garcia died at the age of 76 on 20 July 2017, in São Paulo. The São Paulo State Legislative Assembly commemorated his life by holding an official wake in his honor.

== Contributions to Foreign Affairs ==
Garcia participated in developing Brazil's foreign strategy of diversifying partners post-Cold War, as well as strengthening ties with Latin American, African and Middle Eastern countries.
