= Frederico Siqueira =

Brazilian politician

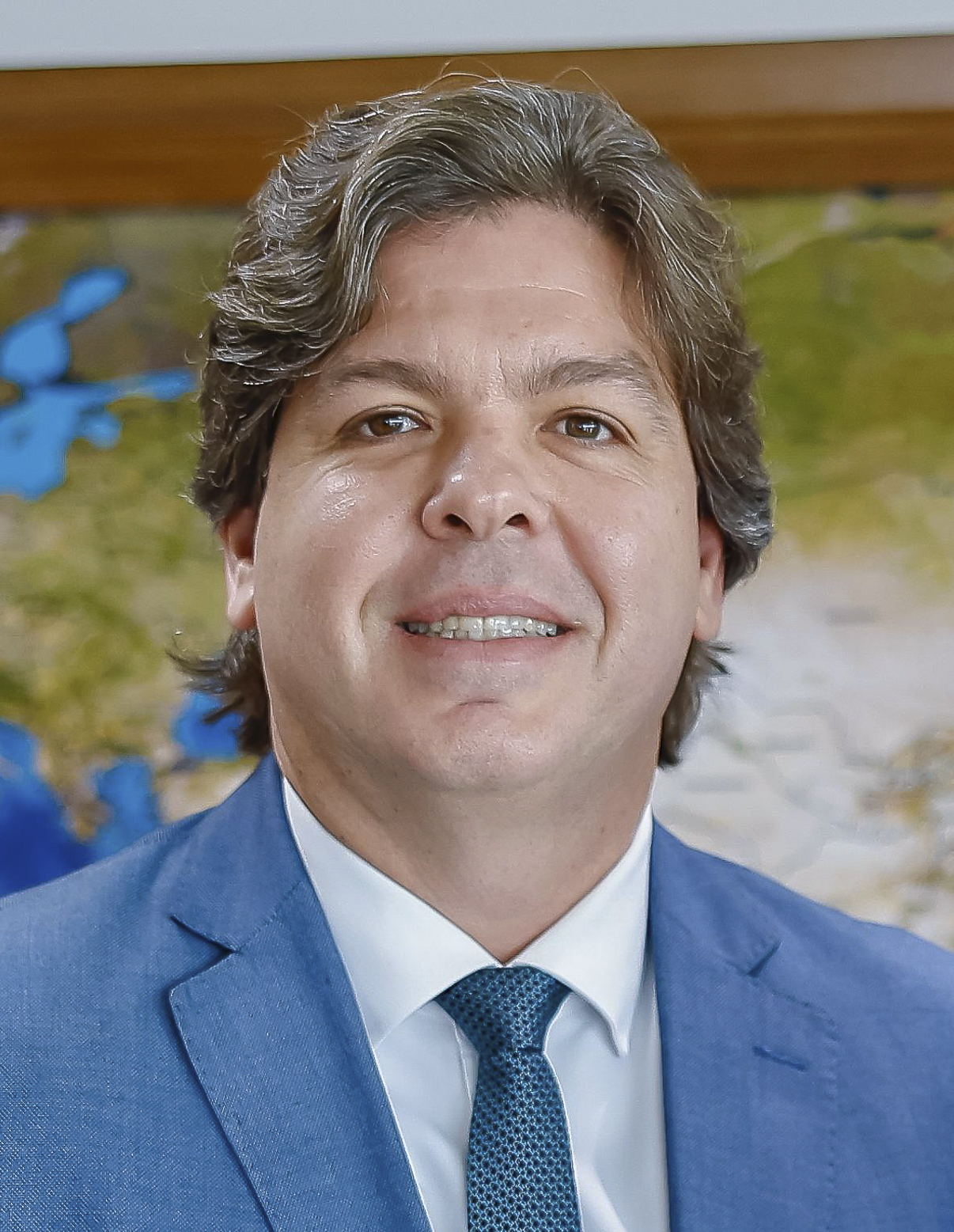
- Siqueira in 2025

Minister of Communications
- Incumbent
- Assumed office 24 April 2025
- President: Luiz Inácio Lula da Silva
- Preceded by: Juscelino Filho

Personal details
- Party: Independent

Frederico de Siqueira Filho is a Brazilian politician serving as minister of communications since 2025. From 2023 to 2025, he served as president of Telebrás.
