= Workers' Party (Brazil) =

Political party in Brazil

Workers' Party Partido dos Trabalhadores
- Abbreviation: PT
- President: Edinho Silva
- Vice President: Washington Quaquá
- Honorary President: Luiz Inácio Lula da Silva
- Founded: 10 February 1980; 46 years ago
- Registered: 11 February 1982; 44 years ago
- Headquarters: São Paulo; Brasília
- Newspaper: Focus Brasil
- Think tank: Fundação Perseu Abramo
- Student wing: Juventude do PT
- Membership (2024): ▲1,653,361
- Ideology: Lulism; Social democracy; Social liberalism; Progressivism; Populism; Factions: Democratic socialism; Socialism of the 21st century; Catholic left; Liberation theology; Historical: Socialism (Brazilian)
- Political position: Centre-left; Historical, now faction: Left-wing
- National affiliation: Brazil of Hope
- Regional affiliation: São Paulo Forum; COPPPAL
- International affiliation: For the Freedom of Nations! Progressive Alliance
- Colors: Red white
- TSE Identification Number: 13
- Governorships: 4 / 27
- Mayors: 252 / 5,570
- Federal Senate: 10 / 81
- Chamber of Deputies: 70 / 513
- Mercosur Parliament: 4 / 38
- State Assemblies: 141 / 1,024
- City Councillors: 3,130 / 56,810

Party flag

Website
- pt.org.br
- Politics of Brazil; Political parties; Elections; A: A broad left-wing faction, it includes some far-left factions.

The Workers' Party (Portuguese: Partido dos Trabalhadores, PT), also known as the Labor Party, is a Left-wing political party in Brazil that is currently the country's ruling party. Some scholars classify its ideology in the 21st century as social democracy, with the party shifting from a broadly socialist ideology in the 1990s, although the party retains a left-wing and marginal far-left faction. Founded in 1980, PT governed at the federal level in a coalition government with several other parties from January 1, 2003, to August 31, 2016. After the 2002 parliamentary election, PT became the largest party in the Chamber of Deputies and the largest in the Federal Senate for the first time. With the highest approval rating in the history of the country at one time, President Luiz Inácio Lula da Silva was PT's most prominent member. Dilma Rousseff, also a member of PT, was elected President twice (first on October 31, 2010, and then again on October 26, 2014) but did not finish her second term due to her impeachment in 2016. The party came back to power with Lula's victory in the 2022 presidential election.

The party has been involved in a number of corruption scandals since Lula first came to power and saw its popular support plummet between 2015 and 2020, with presidential approval ratings falling from over 80% to 9% and successive reductions in all elected offices since 2014. The 2022 general election marked a turning point in that trajectory.

The party symbols are a five-pointed red star inscribed with the initials "PT" in the center; a red flag with a white star also with the initials in the center; and the Workers Party's anthem. Its Superior Electoral Court (TSE) identification number is 13. Members and sympathisers of the party are often known as "Petistas".

== History ==
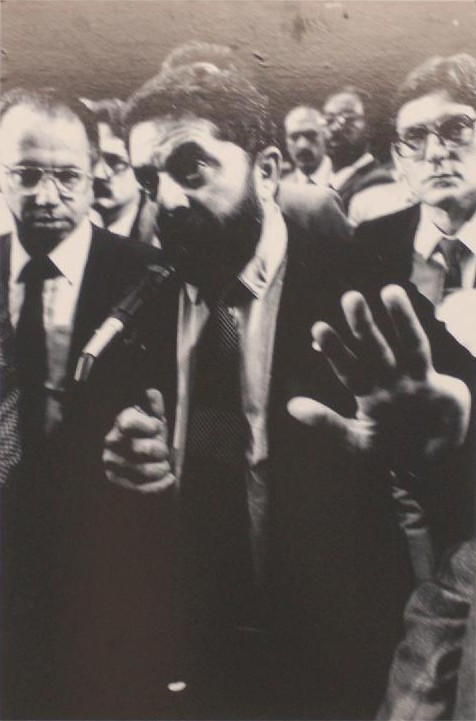
Lula, at the time a Federal Deputy, makes a speech at the 1988 Brazilian Constituent Assembly

The Workers' Party was launched by a heterogeneous group made up of militants opposed to Brazil's military government, trade unionists, left-wing intellectuals and artists and Catholics linked to the liberation theology on February 10, 1980, at Colégio Sion in São Paulo, a private Catholic school for girls. The party emerged as a result of the approach between the labor movements in the ABC Region such as the Conferência das Classes Trabalhadoras (Conclat), later developed into the Central Única dos Trabalhadores (CUT) which carried major strikes from 1978 to 1980; and the old Brazilian left wing, whose proponents, many of whom were journalists, intellectuals, artists and union organizers, were returning from exile with the 1979 Amnesty law, many of them having endured imprisonment and torture at the hands of the military regime in addition to years of exile. Dilma Rousseff herself was imprisoned and tortured by the dictatorship.

PT was born by historical need. PT is not an accident. The future of Brazil goes through a party with the same program as PT, under any name whatsoever, under any leader whomsoever.

— Claudio Solano, journalist

PT was launched under a democratic socialism trend. After the 1964 coup d'état, Brazil's main federation of labor unions, the General Command of Workers (Comando Geral dos Trabalhadores – CGT), which gathered leaders approved by the Ministry of Labour since its formation, a practice tied to the fact that since Getúlio Vargas' Estado Novo, unions had become quasi-state entities, was dissolved while unions themselves suffered intervention of the military regime.

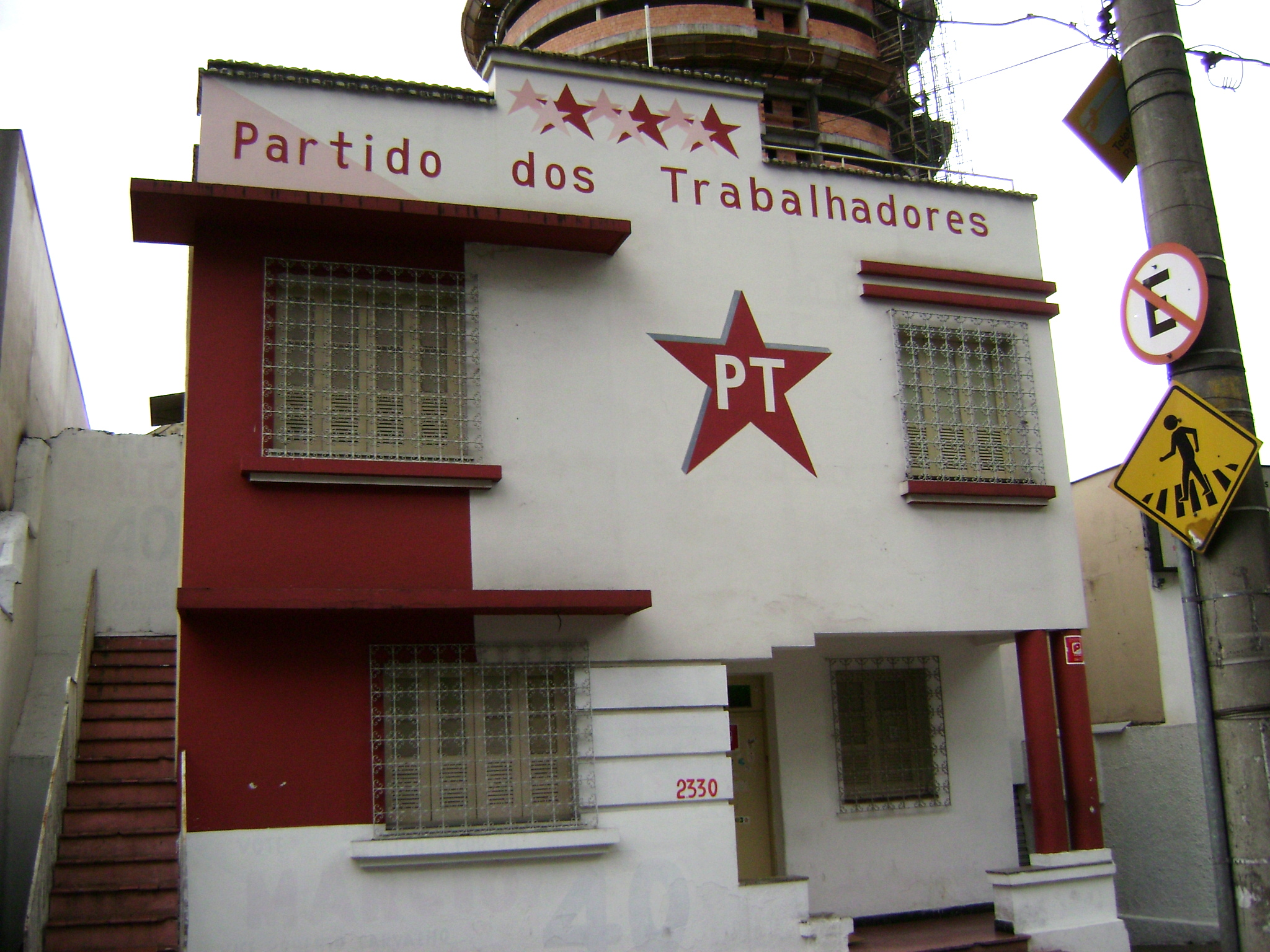
Workers' Party regional branch in Belo Horizonte, Minas Gerais

The resurgence of an organized labour movement, evidenced by strikes in the ABC Region, organized by various unions including the ABC Metalworkers' Union, on the late 1970s led by Luiz Inácio Lula da Silva, enabled the reorganization of the labour movement without the direct interference of the state. The movement originally sought to act exclusively in union politics, but the survival of a conservative unionism under the domination of the state (evidenced in the refoundation of CGT) and the influence exercised over the trade union movement by leaders of traditional left-wing parties, such as the Brazilian Communist Party (Partido Comunista Brasileiro, PCB), forced the unionist movement of ABC, encouraged by anti-Stalinist leaders, to organize its own party.

PT was officially recognized as a party by the Brazilian Supreme Electoral Court on February 11, 1982. The first membership card belonged to art critic and former Trotskyist activist Mário Pedrosa, followed by literary scholar Antonio Candido and historian Sérgio Buarque de Holanda. Holanda's daughter Ana de Holanda later became Minister of Culture in the Rousseff cabinet.

=== Electoral history ===
Presidential elections against PSDB between 1994 and 2014

Since 1988, the Workers' Party has grown in popularity on the national stage by winning the elections in many of the largest Brazilian cities, such as São Paulo, Fortaleza, Belo Horizonte, Porto Alegre and Goiânia as well as in some important states, such as Rio Grande do Sul, Espírito Santo and the Federal District. During the time it governed Porto Alegre, it implemented measures such as a progressive tax reform, involving the rich being taxed more highly to fund basic services for the poor, and the development of new institutions of genuine popular participation which gave, according to one study, "real decision-making power to civil society and involving a large number of civil organizations – from neighbourhood groups to non-governmental organisations (NGOs), and from cultural groups to education, health and housing pressure groups – in running the city."

This winning streak culminated with the victory of its presidential candidate Lula in 2002 who succeeded Fernando Henrique Cardoso of the Brazilian Social Democracy Party (Partido da Social Democracia Brasileira – PSDB). For its defense of economic liberalism, PSDB is the party's main electoral rival as well as the Democrats, heir of the National Renewal Alliance (Aliança Renovadora Nacional – ARENA), ruling party during the military dictatorship. Along with the Popular Socialist Party (Partido Popular Socialista – PPS), a dissidence of PCB, they have been said to form the centre-right opposition to the Lula administration.

1989 presidential elections

In the 1989 general elections, Lula went to the second round with Fernando Collor de Mello. Even though all centrist and left-wing candidates of the first round united around Lula's candidacy, Collor's campaign was strongly supported by the mass media (notably Rede Globo as seen on the documentary Beyond Citizen Kane) and Lula lost in the second round by a close margin of 5.7%.

1994 and 1998 general elections

Leading up to the 1994 general elections, Lula was the leading presidential candidate in the majority of polls. As a result, centrist and right-wing parties openly united for Fernando Henrique Cardoso's candidacy. As Minister of Economy, Cardoso created the Real Plan, which established the new currency and subsequently ended inflation and provided economic stability. As a result, Cardoso won the election in the first round with 54% of the votes. However, it has been noted that "the elections were not a complete disaster for PT, which significantly increased its presence in the Congress and elected for the first time two state governors". Cardoso would once again beat Lula in a rematch and re-elected for a second term in 1998.

2002 general elections

After the detrition of PSDB's image and as a result of an economic crisis that burst in the final years of Cardoso's government, Lula won the 2002 presidential election in the second round.

2006 general elections

On October 29, 2006, PT won 83 seats in the Chamber of Deputies and 11 seats in the Federal Senate. Lula was re-elected with more than 60% of the votes, extending his position as President of Brazil until January 1, 2011.

PT was now the second largest party in the Chamber of Deputies, the fourth largest party in the Federal Senate and has five state governorships. However, it only gained control of one among the ten richest states (Bahia).

2010 general elections

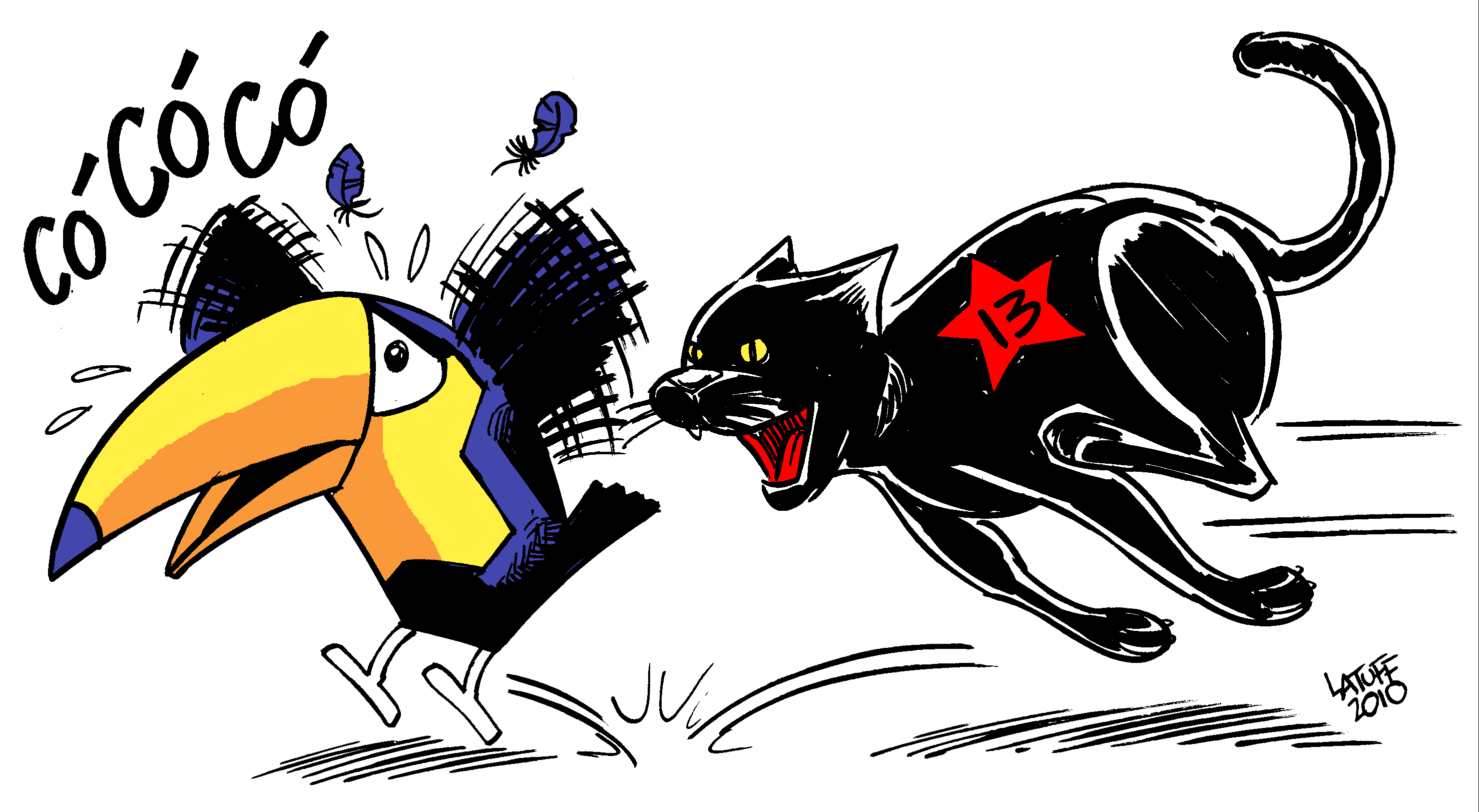
PT as a black cat chasing a toucan (PSDB's mascot) by Carlos Latuff

In the 2010 general elections held on October 3, PT gained control of 17.15% of the seats in the Chamber of Deputies, a record for the party since 2002. With 88 seats gained, it became the largest party in the lower chamber for the first time ever. PT also became the second largest party in the Federal Senate for the first time after electing of 11 senators, making a total of 14 senators for the 2010–2014 legislature. Its national coalition gained control of 311 seats in the lower house and 50 seats in the upper house, a broad majority in both houses which the Lula administration never had. This election also saw the decrease in the number of seats controlled by the centre-right opposition bloc as it shrank from 133 to 111 deputies. The left-wing opposition, formed by PSOL, retained control of three seats.

The party was also expected to elect its presidential candidate Dilma Rousseff in the first round. However, she was not able to receive the necessary number of valid votes (over 50%) and a second round in which she scored 56% of the votes took place on October 31, 2010. On January 1, 2011, she was inaugurated and thus became the first female head of government ever in the history of Brazil and the first de facto female head of state since the death in 1816 of Maria I, Queen of the United Kingdom of Portugal, Brazil and the Algarves.

In the 2010 elections, PT retained control of the governorships of Bahia, Sergipe and Acre, in addition to gaining back control of Rio Grande do Sul and the Federal District. Nevertheless, it lost control of Pará. Candidates supported by the party won the race in Amapá, Ceará, Espírito Santo, Maranhão, Mato Grosso, Pernambuco, Piauí and Rio de Janeiro, which means that PT would participate in 13 out of 27 state governorships.

2014 general elections

In the 2014 general elections held on October 5, the party won 13.9% of the vote and 69 seats in the Chamber of Deputies, down from the 88 seats they gained in 2010. In the first round of the presidential election, Rousseff won 41.6% of the vote but not enough to secure a victory. In the run-off on October 26, Rousseff was re-elected with a narrow victory with 51.6% of the vote against Senator Aécio Neves.

== Cabinet representation ==
PT enjoyed strong representation in the cabinets it led for most of the time that it was in office. PT held the majority of cabinet positions in the first two coalitions, with its occupation of ministerial positions comprising 60% in the first coalition, 54.8% in the second coalition and 46.5% in the third coalition.

== Ideology ==
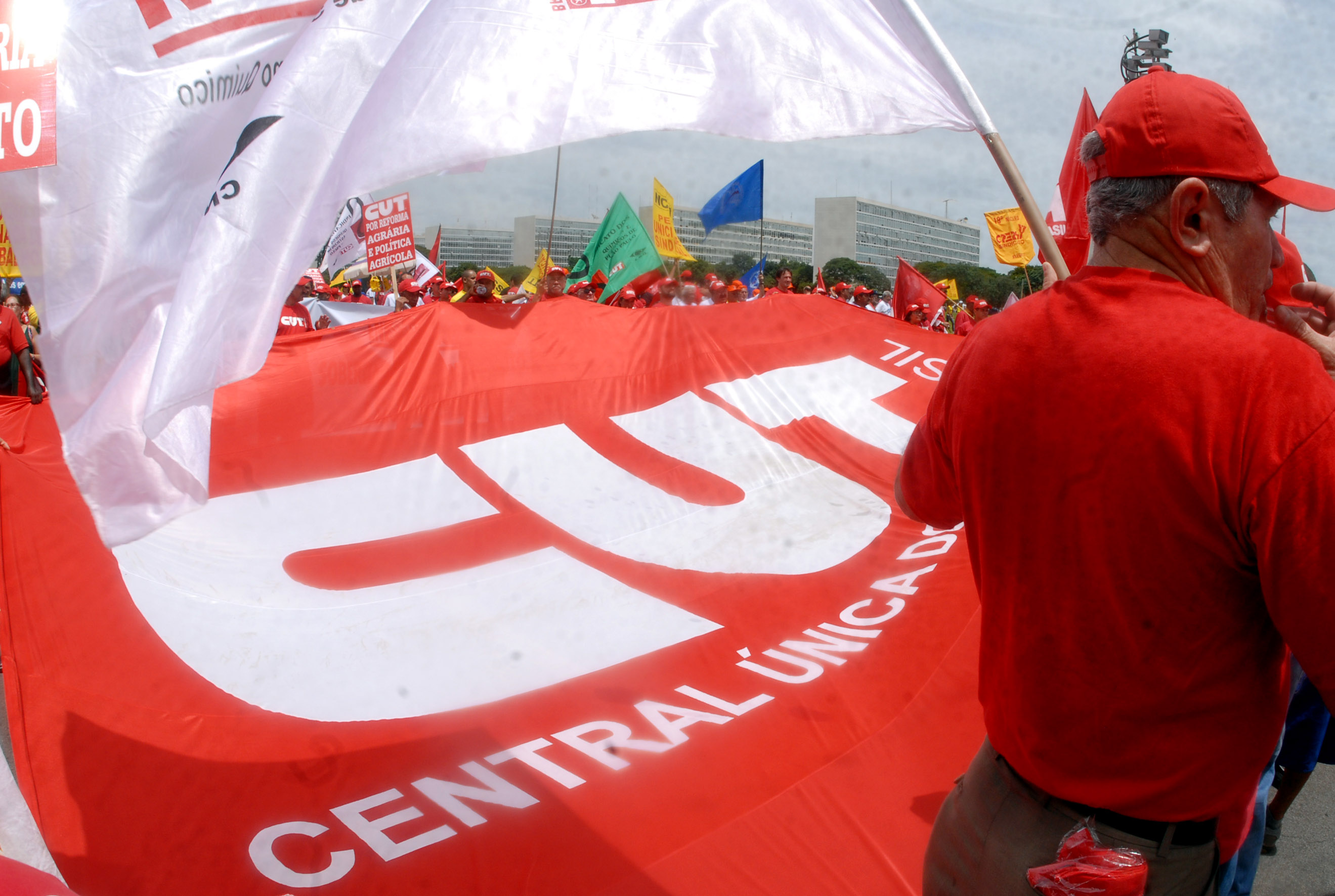
Demonstration of the Central Única dos Trabalhadores (CUT) — Brazil's largest national trade union center — in Brasília. Both CUT and PT share the same origin and both organizations maintain a strong connection

Although PT deliberately never identified itself with a particular brand of leftism, it nevertheless "always defined itself as socialist" and espoused many radical positions. For example, at the Brazilian Constituent Assembly of 1988 it advocated repudiation of Brazil's external debt, nationalization of the country's banks and mineral wealth and a radical land reform. In addition, as a form of protest and as a signal that the party did not fully accept the "rules of the game" PT's delegates refused to sign the draft constitution.

Over the next few years, the party moderated a bit, but it never clearly shed its radicalism and undertook no major reforms of party principles even after Lula's defeat in the 1989 presidential elections. For example, the resolution from the party's 8th National Meeting in 1993 reaffirmed PT's "revolutionary and socialist character", condemned the "conspiracy" of the elites to subvert democracy, stated that the party advocated "radical agrarian reform and suspension of the external debt" and concluded that "capitalism and private property cannot provide a future for humanity".

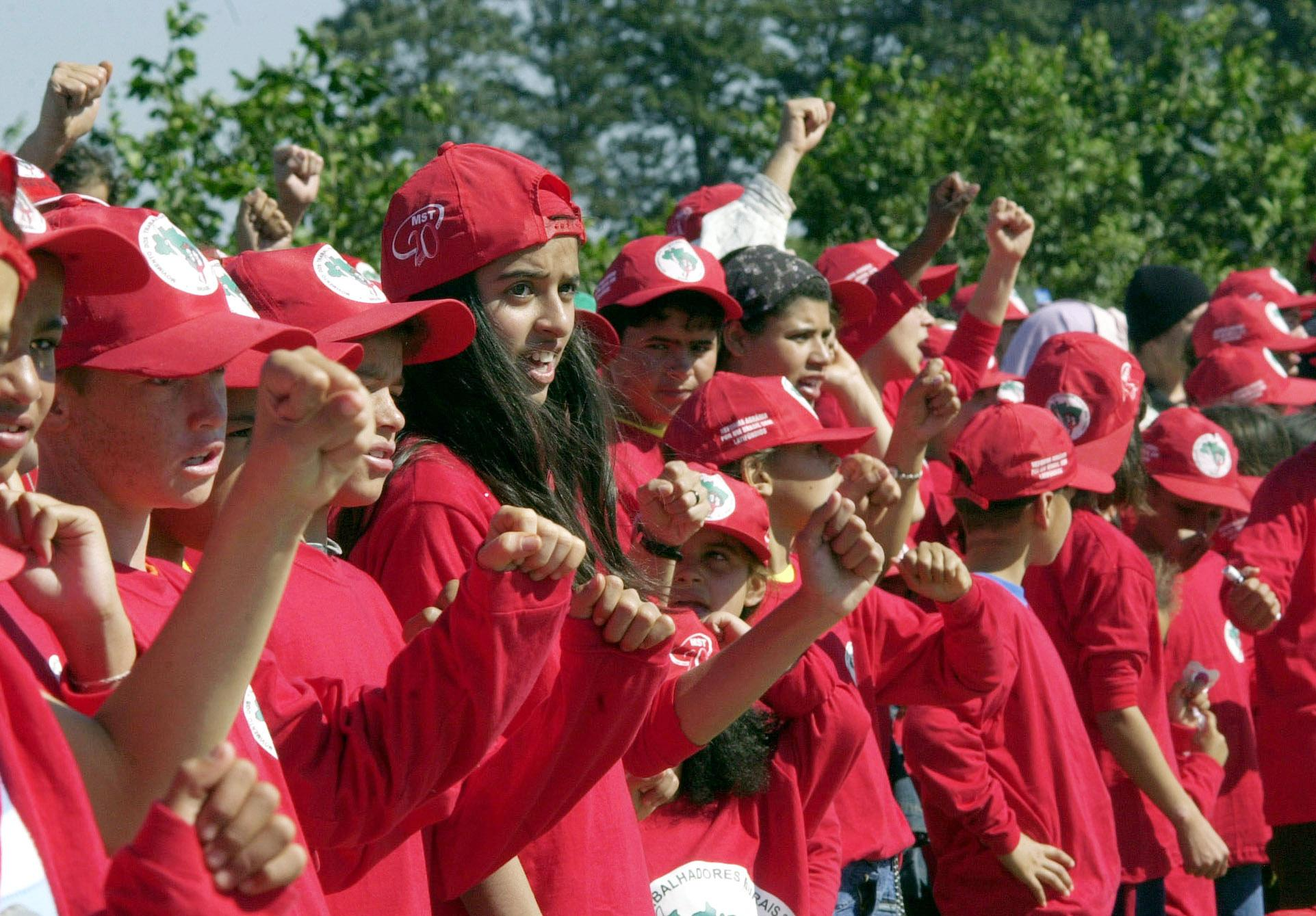
Activists of the Landless Workers' Movement, one of the main social movements linked to the Worker's Party

In 1994, Lula ran for the presidency again and during his campaign dismissed Fernando Henrique Cardoso's recently implemented Real Plan as an "electoral swindle". The resolutions from the 1994 National Meeting condemned the "control by the dominant classes over the means of production" and reaffirmed the party's "commitment to socialism". PT's Program of Government that year also committed the party to "anti-monopolist, anti-latifúndio, and anti-imperialist change [...] as part of a long-term strategy to construct an alternative to capitalism", statements that "sent shivers down the spine of the international financial community". Thus, as of 1995 "little or nothing" had changed in PT's official ideology since the early 1990s.

After Lula's 1994 loss, the party began a slow process of self-examination. The resolution adopted at its 10th National Meeting in 1995 stated that "our 1994 defeat invites a cruel reflection about our image in society, about the external impact of our internal battles, [and] about our ideological and political ambiguities". The move from self-examination did not involve a clean break with the past as in other socialist parties after the end of the Cold War. The process was gradual, full of contradictions and replete with intra-party tension. By 1997, the National Meeting resolution redefined PT's version of socialism as a "democratic revolution", emphasizing a political rather than economic vision of socialism that aimed to make the state "more transparent and socially accountable".

Lula's third presidential campaign platform in 1998 cut socialist proposals and even the mention of a transition to a socialist society, but the party's self-definition remained highly ambiguous as the resolution from the party's Meeting that year affirmed that Lula's platform "should not be confused with the socialist program of PT". Thus, while PT had begun to distance itself from its original socialist rhetoric and proposals by 1998, a clearer shift did not occur until after Lula lost again that year and after Lula and his group had more fully digested the impact of Brazil's changing political context and of Cardoso's economic reforms.

During Lula's fourth presidential run in 2002, the transition away from overt left-wing policies was fully cemented, and in a document known as the Letter to the Brazilian people, Lula committed himself and his party to the reform of taxes and pensions, and to promoting economic growth. He also accepted some of the liberal reforms from the Cardoso government, meaning that the party program was now de facto centre-left and social democratic in its ideology. Lula won the 2002 election in a landslide. However, some of the more left-wing factions of the party were critical of this turn toward the center and later left to form new left-wing parties like the Socialism and Liberty Party.

The party has a strong left-wing Catholic faction, and the Catholic left is considered the leading force behind the creation of the party, together with the Marxist left and 'new unionism'. Catholic grassroots communities known as CEBs became widespread in Brazil and became the backbone of organization development of the PT in rural peripheries and rural areas, where the party relied on its Catholic faction to provide structural network. Whereas the party was considered a 'vehicle' for social change, supportive Catholic communities were "gasoline stations". The socialism of PT appealed to the Brazilian Catholic left, who was heavily influenced by liberation theology and believed that Marxism and Political Catholicism complemented one another. One of pro-PT Catholic priests, Frei Betto, declared in 1986: "A real Christian is a communist, and a real communist a Christian."

Thanks to its large grassroots base, the Catholic left allowed PT to expand en masse and influenced the ideology of the party, as the Catholic factions provided meeting places for PT nuclei and engaged in "political consciousness-raising" amongst the rural population. Because of this, the pastoral work of the Catholic Church is considered to have been "fundamental for the PT's achieving a truly national character". One of the co-founders of PT, Hamilton Pereira, wrote that thanks to its Catholic origins, the party "became a party that [brought] along the various expressions of Brazil". Lula also stated several times that the Catholic left played a more important role in the PT than trade unions. The Workers' Party was the only party in Brazil able to develop such close relations with the Catholic Church.

The PT is also influenced by liberation theology, considered an important factor in the creation of the party. Peter Flynn in the Third World Quarterly wrote that the party is closely linked to liberation theology, and its liberation Catholic faction was an important contribution towards the party's victory in the 2002 Brazilian general election. The liberation theology faction of the party is also regularly included in the party's cabinet appointment. Liberationist bishop Mauro Morelli served as president of the National Council for Food Security, and later became a political advisor of Lula. The PT mayor and Catholic lawyer Patrus Ananias became famous through his administration in Belo Horizonte, which became distinguished for its church-coordinated work against hunger and poverty. Liberation theologist Frei Betto also served as Lula's special adviser, and the faction also played a crucial role in the education policy of the party and the 2010 anti-corruption "clean slate" law. Major liberation theology figures such as Leonardo Boff became supporters of the party. The PT's close relationship with Brazil's progressive Catholic Church continues to influence the rherotic of the party, with its politicians referring concepts from liberation theology.

== Election results ==
=== Presidential elections ===
| Election | Candidate | Running mate | Coalition | First round | | Second round | | Result |
| Election | Candidate | Running mate | Coalition | Votes | % | Votes | % | Result |
|---|---|---|---|---|---|---|---|---|
| 1989 | Luiz Inácio Lula da Silva (PT) | José Paulo Bisol (PSB) | PT; PSB; PCdoB | 11,622,673 | 17.19% (#2) | 31,076,364 | 46.97% (#2) | Lost ✗ |
| 1994 | Luiz Inácio Lula da Silva (PT) | Aloizio Mercadante (PT) | PT; PSB; PCdoB; PPS; PV; PSTU | 17,122,127 | 27.04% (#2) | – | – | Lost ✗ |
| 1998 | Luiz Inácio Lula da Silva (PT) | Leonel Brizola (PDT) | PT; PDT; PSB; PCdoB; PCB | 21,475,211 | 31.71% (#2) | – | – | Lost ✗ |
| 2002 | Luiz Inácio Lula da Silva (PT) | José Alencar (PL) | PT; PL; PCdoB; PMN; PCB | 39,455,233 | 46.44% (#1) | 52,793,364 | 61.27% (#1) | Elected ✓ |
| 2006 | Luiz Inácio Lula da Silva (PT) | José Alencar (PRB) | PT; PRB; PCdoB | 46,662,365 | 48.61% (#1) | 58,295,042 | 60.83% (#1) | Elected ✓ |
| 2010 | Dilma Rousseff (PT) | Michel Temer (PMDB) | PT; PMDB; PR; PSB; PDT; PCdoB; PSC; PRB; PTC; PTN | 47,651,434 | 46.91% (#1) | 55,752,529 | 56.05% (#1) | Elected ✓ |
| 2014 | Dilma Rousseff (PT) | Michel Temer (PMDB) | PT; PMDB; PSD; PP; PR; PDT; PRB; PROS; PCdoB | 43,267,668 | 41.59% (#1) | 54,501,118 | 51.64% (#1) | Elected ✓ |
| 2018 | Fernando Haddad (PT) | Manuela d'Ávila (PCdoB) | PT; PCdoB; PROS | 31,341,997 | 29.28% (#2) | 47,040,380 | 44.87% (#2) | Lost ✗ |
| 2022 | Luiz Inácio Lula da Silva (PT) | Geraldo Alckmin (PSB) | PT; PCdoB; PV; PSOL; REDE; PSB; Solidariedade; Avante; Agir | 57,259,405 | 48.43% (#1) | 60,325,504 | 50.90% (#1) | Elected ✓ |
| 2026 | Luiz Inácio Lula da Silva (PT) | Geraldo Alckmin (PSB) | PT; PCdoB; PV; PSB; PDT; PSOL; REDE | 53,879,538 | 45.16% (#2) | 64,256,232 | 51.79% (#1) | Elected ✓ |
Source: Election Resources: Federal Elections in Brazil – Results Lookup

=== Chamber of Deputies and Senate elections ===
| Election | Chamber of Deputies | | | | Federal Senate | | | | Status |
| Election | Votes | % | Seats | +/– | Votes | % | Seats | +/– | Status |
|---|---|---|---|---|---|---|---|---|---|
| 1982 | 1,458,719 | 3.5 | 8 / 479 | ▲8 | 1,538,786 | 3.6 | 0 / 25 | Steady | Opposition |
| 1986 | 3,253,999 | 6.9 | 16 / 487 | ▲8 | – | – | 0 / 49 | Steady | Opposition |
| 1990 | 4,128,052 | 10.2 | 35 / 502 | ▲19 | – | – | 1 / 31 | ▲1 | Opposition |
| 1994 | 5,959,854 | 13.1 | 49 / 513 | ▲14 | 13,198,319 | 13.8 | 4 / 54 | ▲3 | Opposition |
| 1998 | 8,786,528 | 13.2 | 58 / 513 | ▲9 | 11,392,662 | 18.4 | 7 / 81 | ▲3 | Opposition |
| 2002 | 16,094,080 | 18.4 | 91 / 513 | ▲33 | 32,739,665 | 21.3 | 14 / 81 | ▲7 | Coalition |
| 2006 | 13,989,859 | 15.1 | 83 / 513 | ▼8 | 16,222,159 | 19.2 | 10 / 81 | ▼4 | Coalition |
| 2010 | 16,289,199 | 16.9 | 88 / 513 | ▲5 | 39,410,141 | 23.1 | 15 / 81 | ▲5 | Coalition |
| 2014 | 13,554,166 | 14.0 | 68 / 513 | ▼20 | 15,155,818 | 17.0 | 12 / 81 | ▼3 | Coalition (2014–2016) |
| 2014 | 13,554,166 | 14.0 | 68 / 513 | ▼20 | 15,155,818 | 17.0 | 12 / 81 | ▼3 | Opposition (2016–2018) |
| 2018 | 10,126,611 | 10.3 | 56 / 513 | ▼12 | 24,785,670 | 14.5 | 6 / 81 | ▼6 | Opposition |
| 2022 | 15,354,125 (Note: Votes obtained as part of Brazil of Hope coalition.) | 13.9 | 69 / 513 | ▲13 | 12,456,553 | 12.2 | 9 / 81 | ▲3 | Coalition |
| 2026 | 14,793,128 | 13.0 | 70 / 513 | ▲1 | 27,306,998 | 13.16 | 9 / 81 | Steady | Coalition |
Sources: Georgetown University, Election Resources, Rio de Janeiro State University

== Voter base ==
Most of the Workers' Party votes in presidential elections since 2006 stems from the North and Northeast regions of Brazil. Nevertheless, the party has always won every presidential election in Rio de Janeiro from 1998 to 2014, the Federal District from 1989 to 2010 (with the exception in 1998 when Cardoso won there) and in Minas Gerais from 2002 to 2014 (these are two of the three largest states by number of voters and together they comprise 18.5% of voters). The party also maintains a stronghold in the southernmost state of Rio Grande do Sul, where it has won continuously since the second round of 1989 until 2002.

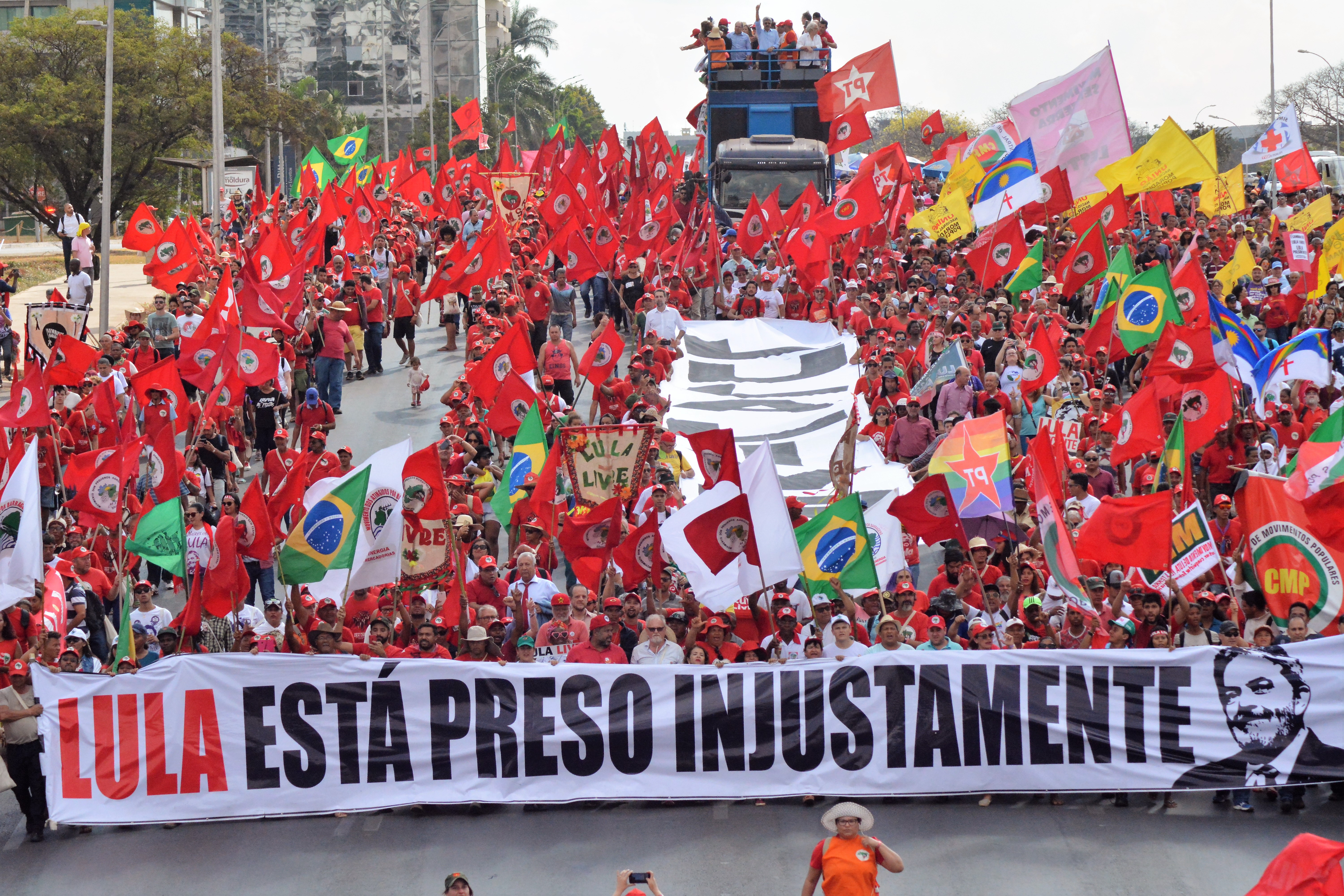
PT supporters in the 2018 election. The banner in the front says "Lula is arrested unfairly".

Most of PT's rejection comes from São Paulo as it has won elections there only once in 2002 (both rounds). The historical PT rejection in São Paulo was more widespread in interior than the capital as PT won the 1988, 2000 and 2012 São Paulo mayoral election and was a major force in his homeland, the Greater São Paulo. Despite this, the party lost its support even in the region and has not won any electoral zone in the capital in 2016 municipal elections. Fernando Haddad, the candidate seeking reelection, stayed in a distant second place, with 36 percentual points below the winner João Doria. PT managed to win in only one city of the region, the small and distant municipality of Franco da Rocha. PT is also strongly rejected in other states of the Center-South, such as Rio de Janeiro, which until 2018 had voted in the Workers Party presidential candidates in all new republic elections except 1994, the party shows strong difficulties to make representatives in federal, state and municipal levels. The party never elected a mayor in the capital of the state, never elected a governor (Benedita da Silva, the sole governor of the state from the party, took over because the resignation of the titular Anthony Garotinho in 2002, which her party had broken some years early, and was massive defeated in the same year's election by the Garotinho's wife Rosângela Matheus) and is often overturned in elections by left-wing parties with much less weight in national elections. The triumphs in the state were more associated with a strong rejection of PSDB in the state (which is even more weak and rejected despite his national strength) than a support of PT's program. In 2018 presidential elections, PT lost in Rio de Janeiro and São Paulo with similar percentages in both states, with a difference of only 0.02% less percent of valid votes to the party in São Paulo. Despite being a southeastern state, many regions of Minas Gerais, especially in the north region of the state, had strong economic, cultural and socially ties with the Northeast. São Francisco River, a symbol of the Northeast, has its source in a small city of Minas, Pirapora. With the exception of Rio Grande do Sul, Distrito Federal, and Espírito Santo PT never gets an elected governor in the Center-south until 2014, when Fernando Damata Pimentel was elected governor of Minas Gerais.

PT had a strong electoral stronghold in North Brazil and in the Amazonian region; The party triumphed in every state governorship in Acre from 1990 to 2018. However, the Acre section of the party is far more independent and moderate than the rest of the party and PT had only won the presidential election in the state twice in 2002 and 2006. PT also lost the governorship of Acre in 2018 to a candidate from right-wing Progressive Party. Roraima, which the impact of the controversy about the indigenous territory of Raposa Serra do Sol, which former President Lula gave strong support despite the opposition of the non-indigenous people; and Rondônia, which had a large population of evangelicals and south/southeastern migrants, also show reservations about the party. The electoral stronghold was also lost in 2018 elections; PT only triumphed in the states of Pará and Tocantins, the only states in the region which borders Brazilian Northeast and much of their culture is near from Northwest than the rest of Amazon. In Amazonas, the largest Brazilian states, PT lost in 2018 for the first time since 1998; PT lost in the capital of the state, Manaus, a free zone which concentrates more than the half of the population of the state; in the large, sparsely inhabited interior of the Amazonian state, PT win by a large margin but insufficient to guarantee the fifth triumph of the party in the state on presidential election.

PT, however, maintained and expanded his stronghold in Northeast Brazil, conquered in Lula first elections in 2002. Since 2002, the only time that a state other than these which did not vote in PT in a presidential election was Alagoas in both rounds of 2002 presidential elections. PT and its allies was able to make big gains in north and northeast regions of Brazil even in times which the party was in crisis, like in the last mayoral elections. PT's most loyal party PCdoB and former allies Brazilian Socialist Party (Partido Socialista Brasileiro − PSB) and Democratic Labour Party (Partido Democrático Trabalhista − PDT) made huge gains in region together with PT in the Lula−Rousseff era. PCdoB is now the strongest party in Maranhão state and was able to elect the mayor of Aracaju, Sergipe; PSB is now the strongest party in the states of Pernambuco and Paraíba; and PDT was able to triumph in three capitals of the northeastern. Despite losing all capitals in northwest, PT had the governorships of three northwestern states, Piauí, Bahia and Ceará. The governorship of Bahia, conquered in 2006, is symbolical. The party was a stronghold of Liberal Front Party (Partido da Frente Liberal − PFL), now Democrats (Democratas − DEM), the greatest ideological rival of PT in national level. PSDB is a strongest party and headed all presidential tickets which PFL/DEM participated since 1994, but the origin of PSDB resembling with the origins PT as a leftist opposition to the dictatorship, and the parties had strong links until PSDB broke with PT and join in a coalition with PFL, a right-wing party with strong fiscal conservative views, associated with the Brazilian military regime in 1993 and the homeland of Antônio Carlos Magalhães, the strongest leadership of PFL and a fierce foe of PT. Bahia is now the main stronghold of PT, the most reliable state for the Petismo and is considered a governance model to the party. Despite this, the state's capital Salvador is governed by ACM Neto, a leading member of DEM and grandson of Antonio Carlos Magalhães.

The party is often accused of exploiting the North–South divide in Brazil to gain votes in the northeast. The party denies the claims and accuses the opposition to do the same in the South and Southeast.

According to a poll conducted by IBOPE on October 31, 2010, during the second round voting PT's candidate Dilma Rousseff had an overwhelming majority of votes among the poorest Brazilians. Her lead was of 26% among those who earned a minimum wage or less per month. Rousseff also had the majority of votes among Catholics (58%), blacks (65%) and mixed-race Brazilians (60%). Amongst whites and Protestants, she was statistically tie to José Serra and her lead was of only 4% on both demographic groups. Even though she was the first female candidate in a major party, her votes amongst men was wider than amongst women.

== Controversies ==
=== 2003–2007 internal crisis and split ===
The changes in the political orientation of PT (from a left-wing socialist to a centre-left social-democratic party) after Lula was elected president were well received by many in the population, but as a historically more radical party, the PT has experienced a series of internal struggles with members who have refused to embrace the new political positions of the party. These struggles have fueled public debates, the worst of which had its climax in December 2003, when four dissident legislators were expelled from the party for voting against Social Insurance Reform. Among these members were congressman João Batista Oliveira de Araujo (known as Babá) and senator Heloísa Helena, who formed the Socialism and Liberty Party (Partido Socialismo e Liberdade − PSOL) in June 2004 and ran for president in 2006, becoming at the time the woman who had garnered the most votes in Brazilian history.

In another move, 112 members of the radical wing of the party announced they were abandoning PT in the World Social Forum in Porto Alegre on January 30, 2005. They also published a manifesto entitled Manifesto of the Rupture that states that PT "is no longer an instrument of social transformation, but only an instrument of the status quo", continuing with references to the International Monetary Fund and other economic and social issues.

=== BANCOOP scandal ===
This scandal, called the BANCOOP case, included João Vaccari Neto and four other directors of the housing cooperative. The cooperative received government contracts and had multi-million real revenue. The cooperative was found to have illegally padded the service contracts by 20%, with many of the contracts going unfulfilled. The cooperative eventually folded with a deficit of over R$100 million, requiring liquidation of assets to minimize the loss by members.

=== 2006 electoral scandal ===
This scandal unfolded around September 2006, just two weeks before general elections. As a result, Berzoini left the coordination of Lula's re-election after allegedly using PT's budget (which is partially state-funded through party allowances) to purchase, from a confessed fraudster, a dossier that would be used to attack political adversaries. On April 25, 2007, the Supreme Electoral Tribunal unanimously cleared Lula of any responsibility for this scandal.

=== Mensalão scandal ===
In July 2005, members of the party suffered a sequence of corruption accusations, started by a deputy of the Brazilian Labour Party (Partido Trabalhista Brasileiro – PTB), Roberto Jefferson. Serious evidence for slush funding and bribes-for-votes were presented, dragging PT to the most serious crisis in its history, known colloquially as the Mensalão. José Genoíno resigned as president of the party and was replaced by Tarso Genro, former mayor of Porto Alegre. A small minority of party members defected as a result of the crisis. Most of them went to PSOL.

=== Lava Jato scandal ===
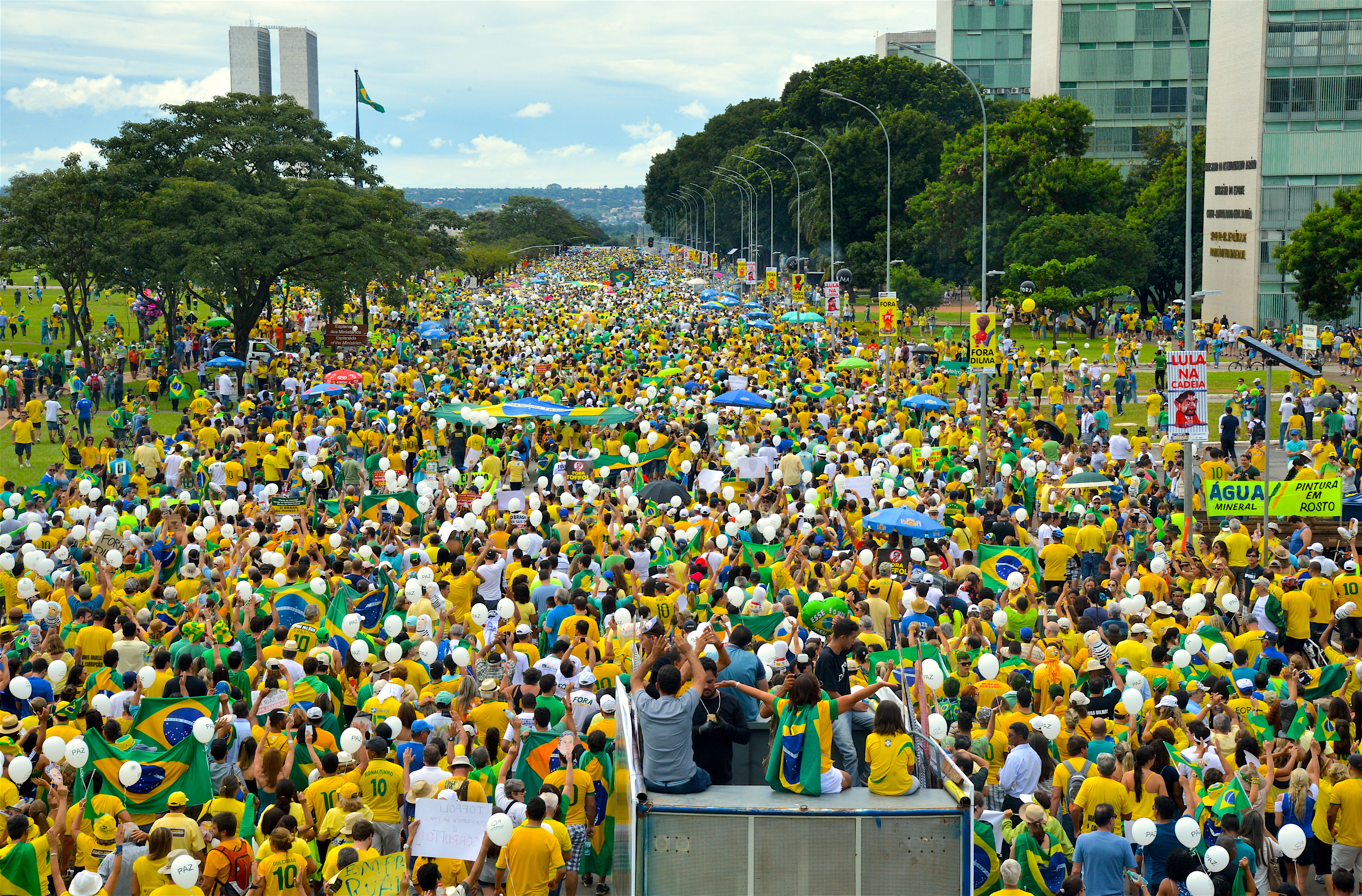
Thousands of protesters against the government of President Rousseff march en route to the National Congress in Brasília, March 13, 2016

The investigation of a series of crimes, such corruption and money laundering, led to the arrest of the party's treasurer João Vaccari Neto and his sister-in-law. José Genoino, José Dirceu, Delcídio do Amaral, André Vargas and Delúbio Soares were also arrested in the process. Between 2014 and February 2016, the Federal Public Prosecutor's Office (Portuguese: Ministério Público da União) filed 37 criminal charges against 179 people, mostly politicians and businessmen. Former President Luiz Inácio Lula da Silva and then President Dilma Rousseff were also implicated.

Most recently, former President Lula was arrested in April 2018. However, in March 2021, the Supreme Federal Court overturned all the convictions. This came after leaks which suggested that Judge Sérgio Moro had conspired with the prosecution.

== Organization ==
=== Presidents ===
Since its inception the party has been led by the following:

- Luiz Inácio Lula da Silva (February 10, 1980 – January 24, 1994)
- Rui Falcão (1994)
- José Dirceu (1995–2002)
- José Genoíno (2002–2005)
- Tarso Genro (2005) (interim)
- Ricardo Berzoini (2005–2006)
- Marco Aurélio Garcia (October 6, 2006 – January 2, 2007) (interim)
- Ricardo Berzoini (January 2, 2007 – February 19, 2010)
- José Eduardo Dutra (February 19, 2010 – April 29, 2011)
- Rui Falcão (April 29, 2011 – June 3, 2017)
- Gleisi Hoffmann (June 3, 2017 – March 7, 2025)
- Humberto Costa (March 7, 2025 – July 6, 2025) (interim)
- Edinho Silva (since July 6, 2025)

=== Structure ===
The party maintains directorates at the zonal, municipal, state and national levels, all elected directly by members of the party based on proportionality, gender parity, and both ethnic-racial and generational criteria. Each directorate elects an executive committee on the same basis to steer each directorate. All directorates of the party are required to meet every two years, at which 2/3 of party members or delegates may authorize a direct election process (processo de eleição direta, PED) to elect or re-elect party leaders. State meetings elect delegates to the National Meeting, who in turn elect the National Executive Committee. In addition, presidents at all levels are directly elected by party members in a two-round system.

The National Executive Committee maintains several national secretariats and sectoral committees (the latter operating under the National Secretariat for Popular Movements and Sectoral Policies) whose leaders act as spokespersons for the party by portfolio:

==== Secretariats ====
- General
- Women;
- Youth;
- Combating Racism
- Lesbians, Gays, Bisexuals, Transvestites and Transsexuals (LGBT)
- Environment and Development
- Agrarian
- Trade Unions
- Culture
- Finance and Planning
- Organization
- Communication
- Popular Movements and Sectoral Policies
- International Relations
- Political Education
- Mobilization
- Institutional Affairs
- Economic Development
- Regional Coordination
- Coordination of Public Policies
- Nucleation

==== Sectoral committees ====
- Social Assistance
- Elderly
- Public Security
- Indigenous Affairs
- Food Security
- Interreligious
- Animal Rights
- Human Rights
- Solidarity Economy
- People with Disabilities
- Education
- Science and Information Technology
- Community
- Health
- Sport and Leisure
- Logistics, Transport and Urban Mobility
- Housing

=== Party elections ===
Leaders of the party are elected through the

=== Factions ===
There are about thirty factions (tendências) within PT, ranging from Articulação, the centre-left group that Lula is a part of, to Marxists and Christian socialists.

==== Tendencies integrating the Building a New Brazil field ====
Considered the right wing of the party, i.e. going from centre to centre-left.

- Articulation - Unity on Struggle (AUNL)
- PT Movement
- Radical Democracy (DR)

==== Tendencies categorized as the left wing of the party ====
- The Work (O Trabalho, OT)
- Left-wing Articulation (AE)
- Socialist Democracy (DS)
- Socialist Brazil (BS)
- Democratic Left (ED)
- Popular Socialist Left (EPS)
- Socialist Resistance (RS)

==== Former factions ====
- Workers' Cause (CO) – seceded from the party in 1990 as the Workers' Cause Party (PCO)
- Socialist Convergence (CS) – seceded in 1993 as part of Unified Workers' Socialist Party (PSTU)
- Workers' Socialist Current (CST) – seceded in 2004 to form the Socialism and Liberty Party (PSOL)
- Socialist Left Movement (MES) – seceded in 2004 to form the Socialism and Liberty Party (PSOL)
- Popular Socialist Action (APS) – seceded in 2005 and joined the Socialism and Liberty Party (PSOL)
- Tendency for the Workers' Revolutionary Party (TPOR) – Trotskyist faction that seceded in 1990 as the Workers' Revolutionary Party (POR)
- Marxist Left (EM), the Brazilian section of the Trotskyist International Marxist Tendency. Marxist Left released a statement saying that "for the revolutionaries, there is no more room for the construction of socialist ideas within PT".

== Famous members ==
Its members are known as petistas, from the Portuguese acronym PT.

- Henos Amorina
- Alexandre Padilha
- Aloizio Mercadante
- Ana Julia Carepa
- Antônio Palocci
- Arlindo Chinaglia
- Benedita da Silva
- Binho Marques
- Cabo Almi
- Chico Buarque
- Chico Mendes
- Dilma Rousseff
- Eduardo Suplicy
- Fernando Haddad
- Fernando Pimentel
- Guido Mantega
- Jaques Wagner
- João Paulo Cunha
- João Vaccari Neto
- José Dirceu
- Luis Favre
- Luiz Gushiken
- Luiz Inácio Lula da Silva
- Luizianne Lins
- Marcelo Déda
- Marco Aurélio Garcia
- Marilena Chaui
- Juliana Prestes, niece of Luís Carlos Prestes
- Oriel Filho
- Olívio Dutra
- Paulo Delgado
- Paulo Freire
- Rodrigo Maroni
- Sérgio Buarque de Holanda
- Sócrates
- Tarso Genro
- Wellington Dias

== See also ==
- List of political parties in Brazil

| Preceded by 12 – DLP (PDT) | Numbers of Brazilian Official Political Parties; 13 – WP (PT) | Succeeded by 14 – Mission (Missão) |
