= Impeachment of Dilma Rousseff =

2015 Brazilian charging of president

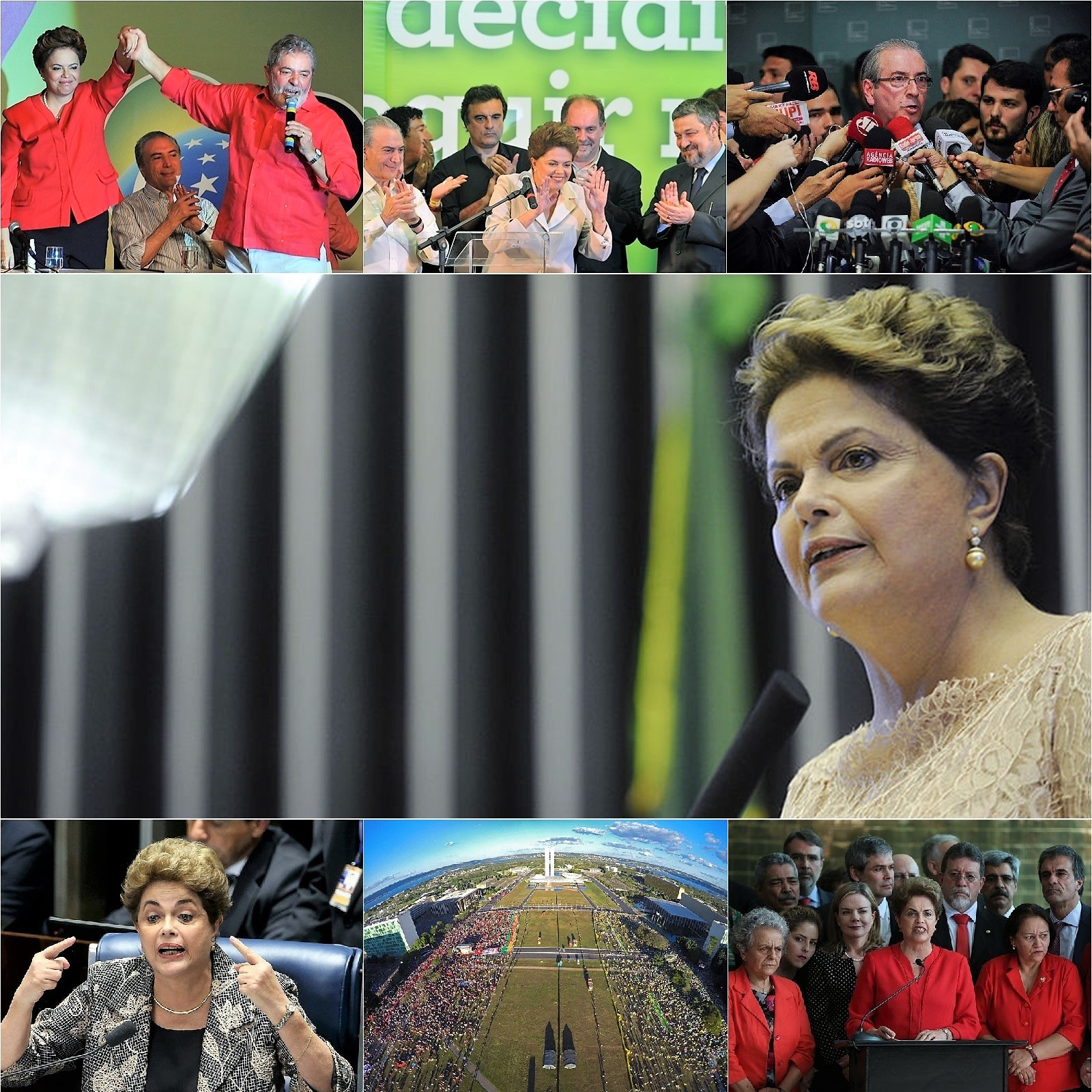
- From top, left to right: Rousseff is announced as the Workers' Party candidate for President; Rousseff is elected President in 2010; President of the Chamber, Eduardo Cunha, announces the opening of an impeachment process in December 2015; Rousseff gives a speech during her second inauguration in January 2015; Rousseff, as suspended President, during her trial in the Senate; Monumental Axis in Brasília at the day of the impeachment voting; Rousseff gives a speech after her removal from office.
- Accused: Dilma Rousseff, President of Brazil
- Proponents: Hélio Bicudo; Miguel Reale Júnior; Janaína Paschoal
- Date: 2 December 2015 – 31 August 2016 (8 months, 4 weeks and 1 day)
- Outcome: Convicted by the Federal Senate, removed from office
- Charges: Criminal administrative misconduct, disregarding the Brazilian federal budget
- Cause: Operation Car Wash; Responsibility crimes for "fiscal pedaling"; Opening of supplementary credits without Congress approval

Congressional votes

Voting in the Chamber of Deputies
- Accusation: Vote to open impeachment process
- Votes in favor: 367
- Votes against: 137
- Present: 7
- Not voting: 2
- Result: Approved

Voting in the Federal Senate
- Accusation: Vote to suspend Rousseff from the presidency
- Votes in favor: 55
- Votes against: 22
- Present: 2
- Not voting: 1
- Result: Rousseff suspended from office; Michel Temer becomes Acting President
- Accusation: Vote to remove Rousseff from office
- Votes in favor: 61 "guilty"
- Votes against: 20 "not guilty"
- Result: Convicted; Michel Temer becomes President
- Accusation: Vote to remove political rights
- Votes in favor: 42 "guilty"
- Votes against: 36 "not guilty"
- Present: 3
- Result: Acquitted (54 "guilty" votes necessary for a conviction)

The impeachment of Dilma Rousseff, the president of Brazil, began on 2 December 2015 with a petition for her impeachment being accepted by Eduardo Cunha, then president of the Chamber of Deputies, and continued into late 2016. Rousseff, then more than 12 months into her second four-year term, was charged with criminal administrative misconduct and disregard for the federal budget in violation of article 85, items V and VI, of the Constitution of Brazil and the Fiscal Responsibility Law, Article 36. The petition also accused Rousseff of criminal responsibility for failing to act on the scandal at the Brazilian national petroleum company, Petrobras, on account of allegations uncovered by the Operation Car Wash investigation, and for failing to distance herself from the suspects in that investigation.

Rousseff was president of the Petrobras board of directors during the period covered by the investigation, and approved Petrobras' controversial acquisition of the Pasadena Refining System. However, the Petrobras charges were not included in the impeachment because Prosecutor-General Rodrigo Janot, besides declaring that "there was no doubt that Dilma is not corrupt", successfully argued that a sitting president could not be investigated while in office for crimes committed prior to election.

Rousseff was formally impeached on 17 April 2016. On 12 May, the Senate voted to suspend Rousseff's powers for the duration of the trial, and Vice President Michel Temer became acting president. On 31 August 2016, the Senate removed President Rousseff from office by a 61–20 vote, finding her guilty of breaking Brazil's budget laws; however, she did not receive enough votes from the Senate to be disqualified from her political rights. Accordingly, Temer was sworn in as the 37th president of Brazil. Temer was accused by an Odebrecht executive of soliciting campaign donations in 2014 for his party. He faced trial along with Rousseff in the Superior Electoral Court (TSE) in a complaint filed by Aécio Neves, the candidate narrowly defeated by Rousseff in the 2014 presidential runoff, over irregularities in their campaign funds—Rousseff had shared the PT-PMDB coalition ticket with Temer.

On 9 June 2017, the court rejected, by a 4–3 vote, the allegations of campaign finance violations by the Rousseff-Temer ticket during the 2014 electoral campaign. As a result of that judgement, President Temer remained in office and both Rousseff and Temer have retained their political rights.

== Background ==
=== Petrobras and "fiscal pedalling" ===
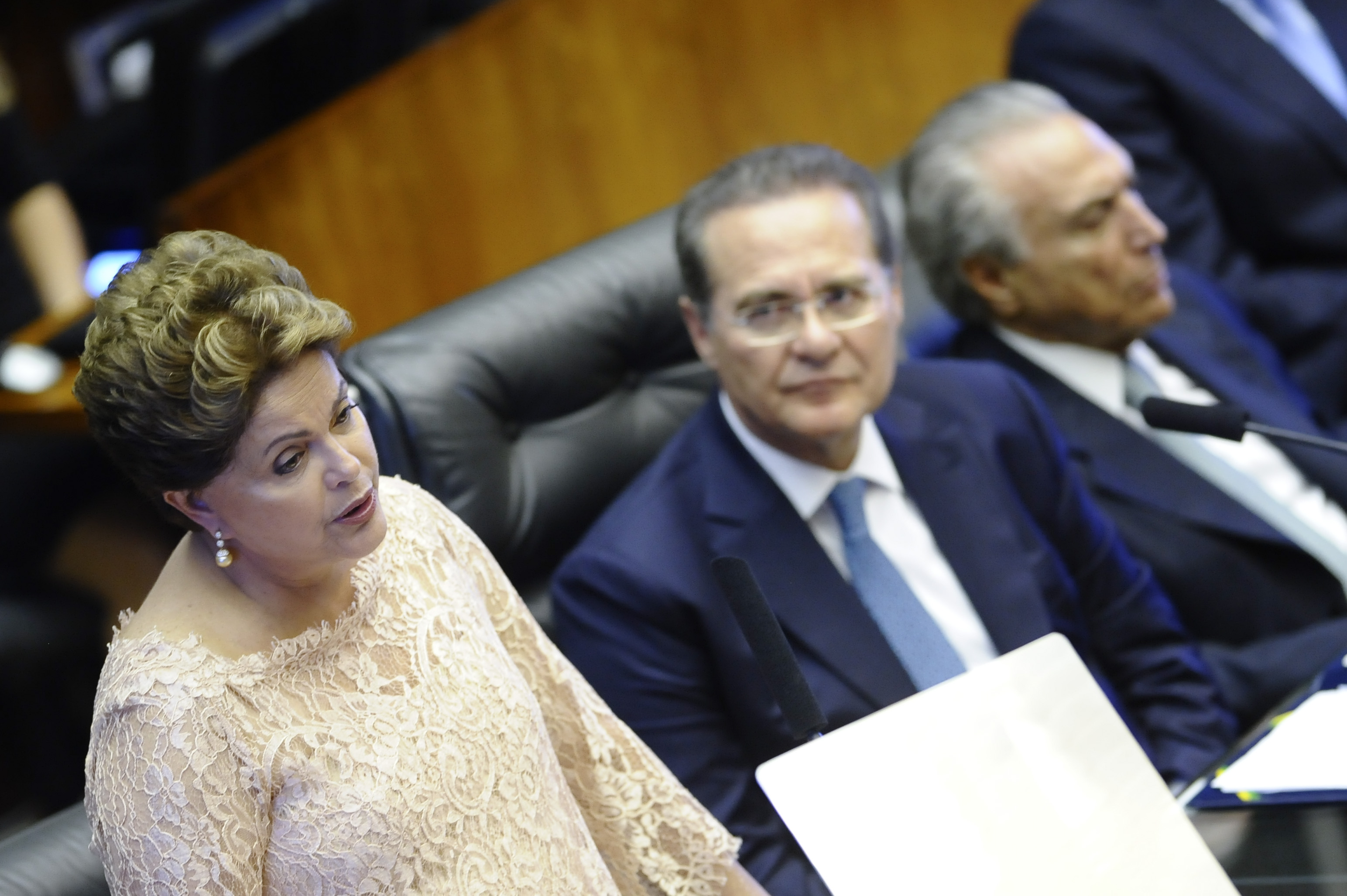
Rousseff speaking to a joint session of the National Congress at her presidential inauguration, 1 January 2015. Behind her are Senate president Renan Calheiros, and Vice President Michel Temer.

Graft allegedly occurred during Rousseff's term as chair of the board of directors of the state-owned energy company Petrobras between 2003 and 2010. In February 2014, an investigation by the Federal Police, codenamed Operation Car Wash, put Petrobras at the center of "what may be the largest corruption scandal in Brazil's history". On 14 November 2014, police raids in six Brazilian states brought in several prominent Brazilian politicians and businessmen, including some Petrobras directors, who were investigated for "suspicious" contracts worth $22 billion. Further investigation also found offshore accounts and art collections held by those involved in the controversy.

However, no evidence that Rousseff herself was involved in the Petrobras controversy has been found and she has denied any prior knowledge of the scandal. More than one million Brazilians protested in the streets in March 2015 calling for Rousseff's impeachment. On 5 May 2016, Supreme Court justice Teori Zavascki dismissed counts brought against Rousseff by Senator Delcídio do Amaral based on the Petrobras controversy, ruling that a sitting president could not be investigated for actions taken before assuming office as had been argued by Prosecutor-General Rodrigo Janot.

Rousseff was also accused of fiscal pedaling in her administration—an accounting maneuver to give the false impression that more money was received than was spent. The government allegedly failed to fund public and private banks that managed public payments, including social assistance programs like Bolsa Família, forcing the banks to finance the programs themselves without compensation. The Rousseff Administration's budgeting allegedly used this pedaling to improve its fiscal outcomes and make the surplus for the years 2012 to 2014 appear larger. The Tribunal de Contas da União (TCU), unanimously declared this maneuver a violation of fiscal responsibility. TCU, an auxiliary of the legislative body, has no legal power, but their decision put the National Congress under great pressure to begin impeachment proceedings.

=== Political context ===
Rousseff won the 2014 general election with 51.64% of the votes in one of the most contentious presidential elections in the country's history. Sworn in on 1 January 2015, Rousseff began her second term weakened by corruption allegations as well as the 2014–2016 Brazilian economic recession. On 15 March 2015, protests began, gathering millions of Brazilians across the country to demand among other things Rousseff's resignation or her impeachment. By June 2015 some polls reported her disapproval rating as high as 68%, the highest for any Brazilian president since the country's redemocratization, and by August 2015 this had risen to 71%.

Rousseff's government was accused by the TCU of misconduct in management of public accounts since 2012. The President of the Chamber of Deputies, Eduardo Cunha, was investigated in Operation Car Wash for allegedly receiving bribes and keeping secret Swiss bank accounts. The Council of Ethics and Parliamentary Decorum of the Chamber of Deputies of Brazil filed a complaint against him, putting him at risk of losing his seat. The council was responsible for judging and applying penalties to deputies in cases of non-compliance with norms. Rumors emerged about attempts between Cunha's party (PMDB) and Rousseff's party to reach an agreement: that she would archive the lawsuit against Cunha if he would refuse to accept the request for her impeachment. When the Workers' Party announced to the Council of Ethics its support for the lawsuit against Cunha, he accepted the impeachment request, allegedly in retaliation. Cunha dismissed that his decision was motivated by personal or political reasons.

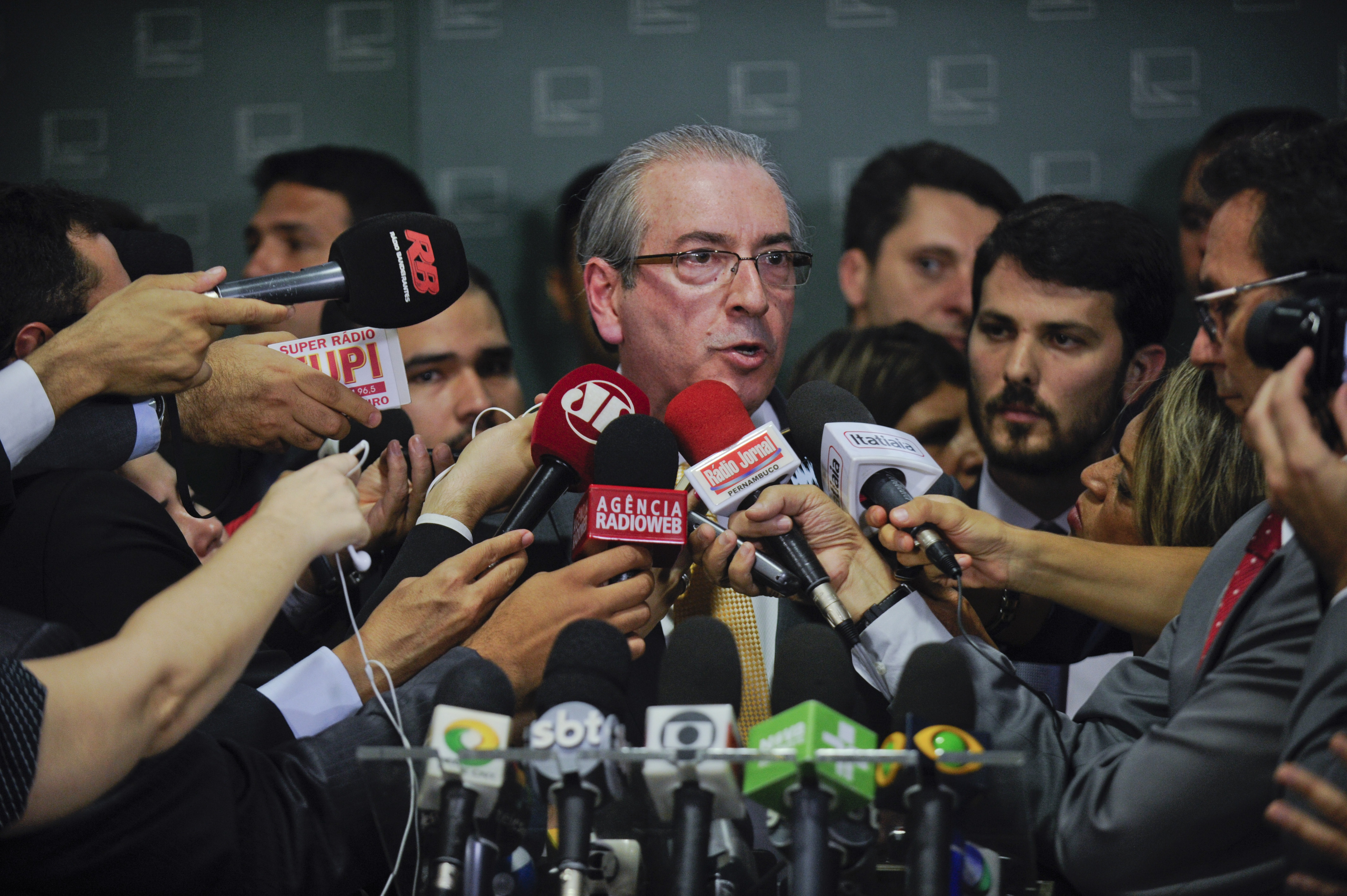
Eduardo Cunha stating that the Chamber of Deputies had agreed to open the proceedings, on 2 December 2015.

In his defence, Cunha said that opening the impeachment process was his constitutional duty as chamber president, and the decision to do so was based only on facts related to the budget laws. Cunha said further that he had no personal grievance against the Workers' Party and that Rousseff had signed six decrees for additional spending, which had increased the 2015 federal spending in non-compliance with the annual budget law and without approval of the Congress.

Rousseff denied any attempted deal to save Cunha in return for stopping her impeachment, and also denied agreements to interfere with the Council of Ethics in exchange for approval of the re-introduction of the CPMF tax (Provisional Tax on Financial Transactions), which was a wish from the government. At a news conference on 2 December 2015, she said that she would never accept or agree to any kind of corrupt bargain.

I have received with indignation the decision by the head of the lower chamber to [launch] the impeachment process. There is no wrongful act committed by me, nor are there any suspicions that I have misused public money [...] The reasons given for this request [of impeachment] are inconsistent and unfounded. I have not committed any illicit act. My government performed all acts according to the principle of responsibility towards the public property, [...] I've committed no illicit act, there is no suspicion hanging over me of any misuse of public money. I don't have any offshore bank accounts, I have no hidden assets. [...] I would never accept any kind of bargain, much less those that threaten the free functioning of democratic institutions in this country.

— Dilma Rousseff, television news 2 December 2015.

After this pronouncement by the president, Cunha said Rousseff had lied to the nation when she said she would not participate in any deal and that her government had much to explain to the country. Cunha claimed he was not aware of any negotiations and that he had never met Jaques Wagner, the supposed intermediary in the alleged negotiations with Rousseff. Declaring his opposition to the Workers' Party, he said he would rather forgo their three votes in the Council of Ethics.

She lied on national television network and this is very serious. If she had not participated directly I would not speak.

— Eduardo Cunha, News conference – 3 December 2015.

=== Comments by specialists and public opinion ===
Professor Leonardo Avritzer of Universidade Federal de Minas Gerais told Agência Brasil in December 2015 that the political crisis was tied to Rousseff's inability to negotiate with Congress, and that Brazil's fragmented political system (and many political parties) had created an ungovernable government. According to him, the opposition confronting Rousseff after the 2014 elections calling for a recount and her disputed campaign accounts, culminating in the impeachment process, had been other major factors in the destabilization of the government. However, political scientist Luciana Veiga stated that, at that time, the process was benefiting Rousseff, who was now free from blackmail and could potentially reorganize her government. Veiga believed that Cunha could be removed from office and that the opposition would try to push the impeachment process of Rousseff in Congress for 2016 in order to mitigate the "electoral ecstasy" and "act of revenge" that were said to be the cause of the impeachment attempt.

In CNT/MDA polls conducted in March 2015, only 10.8% of Brazilians approved of Rousseff's government and 59.7% wanted her impeached. By July 2015, the latter number had risen to 62.8%. Similar data were collected by the Datafolha Institute in April 2016, showing that 61% of Brazilians believed that Rousseff should be impeached.

== Request for impeachment ==
A total of 37 requests for the impeachment of Rousseff had been presented to the Chamber of Deputies from 2012 until her actual impeachment. Of these 23 were archived and did not proceed. The remaining 14 proceeded, but only one was accepted by Cunha. Submitted by former congressman and attorney Hélio Bicudo and attorneys Miguel Reale Júnior and Janaína Paschoal, it was based on allegations of omission concerning the Petrobras controversy, fiscal responsibility crimes, and budgetary mismanagement.

=== Omission ===
The illegal or suspicious transactions investigated by Operation Car Wash included the purchase of Pasadena Refinery by Petrobras, a deal that cost it R$792 million (US$362 million). Rousseff chaired the board of directors of Petrobras when the purchase was approved. She later said that a mistake had been made concerning a contractual clause and that "her decision was based on a technically and legally flawed summary" of the purchase document drawn up by Nestor Cerveró, the financial director of Petrobras Distribuidora (the fuel distribution and trading subsidiary of Petrobras). Petrobras paid Astra Oil, a wholly owned subsidiary of Astro Oil Trading NV, $360 million for 50% of Pasadena Refining System. A year later, Astra exercised a put option that required Petrobras to buy out the other half, then won the arbitration case over the deal. In May 2015, Cerveró was convicted of money laundering and sentenced to five years in jail. In April 2021, Rousseff was acquitted by the Brazilian Court of Accounts in a lawsuit over the purchase of the Pasadena refinery. The court considered that Rousseff had no responsibility in the purchase, as well as other former members of the board of directors.

According to the Request, the president called the allegations "a kind of coup and merely an attempt to weaken Petrobras". Emphasizing its expertise in the economy and energy sectors, the president stressed the company's financial health. She stepped down from the Petrobras board only in February 2015.

Some international companies were encouraged and, thereafter participated in unrealistic bids to drain the state-owned company, giving back much of the value through illicit contracts. According to the Request, a person with knowledge of the Petrobras accounts should to evaluate, as a company staff member, the overbilling in approved contracts. It was alleged that statements taken from the accused in Operation Car Wash suggested that Lula and Rousseff had known of the bribery scheme in Petrobras.

=== Fiscal responsibility crimes ===
Rousseff issued six unnumbered decrees in 2014 and 2015 that allocated funds to social programs, allegedly for political purposes, without authorization from Congress. These totaled R$18.5 billion (US$6.9 billion) and were contracted in official financial institutions with neither the necessary legislative authorization, nor targets which complied with the Lei de Responsabilidade Fiscal (Fiscal Responsibility Law) and the Annual Budgetary Law. To obtain these additional credits, the target of 2014 was reduced by the end of 2014 by R$67 billion (US$25 billion) at the request of the president. Rousseff allegedly committed similar crimes of fiscal irresponsibility in 2015. She further issued such decrees in the years 2014 and 2015 to authorize the opening credit precisely to, purportedly, allow the provision of additional resources despite it being known that the primary superavit target in the budget forecast was not being fulfilled, and would not be fulfilled, hence disregarding the Annual Budgetary Law and the Federal Constitution.

=== "Fiscal pedaling" ===
In 2011 and 2014, Rousseff's government is said to have held illegal credit operations, using funds from the state-owned banks Caixa Econômica Federal and Banco do Brasil to finance social programs without officially declaring loans from either of those banks, an example of fiscal pedaling. These transactions were reported in 2015 by the TCU and, according to the report, were undertaken in order to improve the government's chances of re-election.

Caixa Econômica Federal and Banco do Brasil operated federal social programs under a government contract at this time. The government would pass the funds necessary to finance the programs through the Secretariat of the National Treasury every month. They were obliged to transfer the equivalent values for the equalization of interest rates, expenditures and legal transfers covered under the contract. But the government had not made these reimbursements, and the contracted banks instead funded the programs using their own capital, capital that the government was obliged to reimburse them for, although no loans had been officially filed. The Fiscal Responsibility Law (Article 36) prohibits members of the federal government who control state financial institutions from borrowing from those institutions that they control. The total balance of these liabilities by the end of August 2014 was R$1.74 billion (US$740 million). Of the total R$7.8 billion (US$2.9 billion) spent on subsidies in these programs between 2009 and 2014, only R$1.6 billion (US$590 million) was transferred by the Government.

At the end of 2014, Rousseff sent the Congress PLN 362014, to change the Budgetary Directives Law in order to modify the rules of the primary superavit (surplus), and hence showing her knowledge of the fiscal pedaling by taking steps to normalize the accounts.

== Process in Congress ==
=== Request for impeachment ===
By September 2015, 37 requests for impeachment had been filed with the Chamber of Deputies against Rousseff, but Cunha did not accept any, except for that of Hélio Bicudo and lawyers Miguel Reale Júnior and Janaína Paschoal. Much of the pro-impeachment movement (including the Free Brazil group and Come to the Street Movement) joined Bicudo's request. Congressmen supportive of the impeachment also organized a petition in its favor, which garnered the signatures of two million Brazilians.

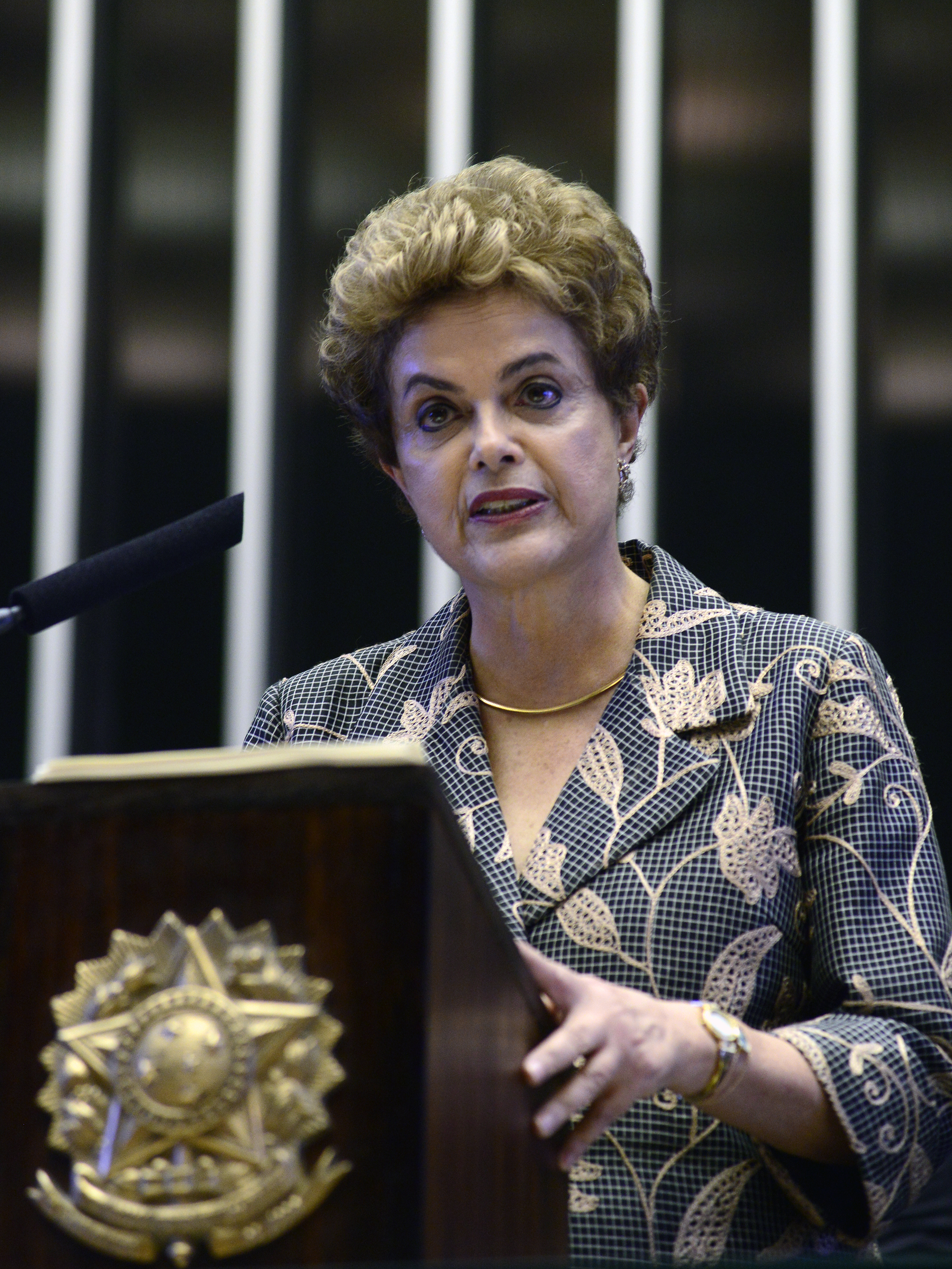
President Dilma Rousseff speaking before the Brazilian Congress on 2 February 2016.

Documents presented to the House attempted to implicate Rousseff in the controversy uncovered by Operation Car Wash, citing a failure to investigate corruption allegations against former President Luiz Lula da Silva, in addition to those and other allegations against herself. The six decrees which were the subject of many of those allegations of fiscal pedaling and which Rousseff had unilaterally pushed into law were also entered as evidence.

In the first day of the Brazilian legislative year 2016 (2 February), Rousseff spoke in Congress. That unusual personal attendment to Congress to inform her government's legislative agenda has served to mitigate the signs that 2016 should be, once again, a year of political battlefield.

The President discourse was marked by calls for support new taxes to overcome the crisis, boos from Rousseff opponents, as well as criticism even from her allies. Received by the then Presidents of Senate (Renan Calheiros), Supreme Federal Court (Ricardo Lewandowski), and Chamber of Deputies (Eduardo Cunha), Rousseff kissed the faces of the first two, and with Cunha - who accepted her impeachment request - only greeted with a quick handshake.

A banner held by deputies Eduardo Bolsonaro and Jair Bolsonaro (who would be elected President of Brazil in 2018) had written the phrase: "Brazil can't tolerate you anymore. Get out".

=== Voting in the Chamber committee ===
A special committee formed in the Chamber of Deputies voted on 11 April 2016 on the petition's admissibility, at the same time that 37 of the 65 committee members were also facing charges of corruption or other crimes. Testimony by the authors of the request was followed by Rousseff's defense. Meanwhile, street protests both for and against the impeachment occurred throughout the country. The committee eventually voted 38 to 27 for impeachment.

Chamber of Deputies special committee vote on report against President Dilma Rousseff.
Ballot	11 April 2016
Required majority	33 out of 65 (51%)
Yes	38 / 65
No	27 / 65
Abstentions	0 / 65
Absentees	0 / 65

Chamber of Deputies vote on initiating impeachment proceedings against President Dilma Rousseff.
Ballot	17 April 2016
Required majority	342 out of 513 (66.67%)
Yes	367 / 513
No	137 / 513
Abstentions	7 / 513
Absentees	2 / 513

Party	Votes	%	Seats	
Party	Votes	%	For	Against
Brazilian Democratic Movement Party	66	13.10	59	7
Workers' Party	60	11.90	0	60
Brazilian Social Democracy Party	52	10.32	52	0
Progressive Party	42	8.33	38	4
Party of the Republic	36	7.14	26	10
Social Democratic Party	37	7.34	29	8
Brazilian Socialist Party	32	6.35	29	3
Democrats	28	5.56	28	0
Brazilian Republican Party	22	4.37	22	0
Brazilian Labour Party	20	3.97	14	6
Democratic Labour Party	18	3.57	6	12
Solidariedade	14	2.78	14	0
National Labour Party	12	2.38	8	4
Communist Party of Brazil	10	1.98	0	10
Social Christian Party	10	1.98	10	0
Popular Socialist Party	8	1.59	8	0
Humanist Party of Solidarity	7	1.39	6	1
Green Party	6	1.19	6	0
Republican Party of the Social Order	6	1.19	4	2
Socialism and Liberty Party	6	1.19	0	6
Sustainability Network	4	0.79	2	2
Labour Party of Brazil	3	0.60	2	1
National Ecologic Party	2	0.40	1	1
Social Liberal Party	2	0.40	2	0
Brazilian Woman's Party	1	0.20	1	0
Total	504	100.00	367	137
Valid votes	504	98.63		
Invalid/blank votes	7	1.37		
Total votes	511	100.00		
Registered voters/turnout	513	99.61		
Source: O Globo

=== Senate vote on suspension ===
After it passed out of committee, the full lower house also voted in favor of impeachment, 367 for and 137 against, with 342 necessary for it to pass (7 abstaining, 2 absent). But similarly to the situation in committee, 303 of the 513 members of the lower house were facing criminal charges or investigation at the time of the vote. Cunha then referred the matter to the Senate which eventually, after a session of more than twenty hours on 12 May, resolved to suspend Rousseff's presidential powers and duties for up to 180 days, a motion which passed 55–22. During the judicial process leading up to the Senate vote on impeachment, then Vice President Michel Temer served as acting president. But before that, on 5 May 2016, Teori Zavascki, judge of the Supreme Federal Court ruled that Cunha must step down as president of the Chamber, because he faced a corruption trial. The decision was later endorsed by all eleven judges of the Court but nevertheless did not affect the process of impeachment.

On 12 September 2016, Cunha was finally ousted from the Chamber with his political rights suspended under accusation of lying in testimony to the committee investigating Operation Car Wash allegations, the culmination of an internal investigation that had lasted eleven months. On 19 October 2016, Cunha was arrested on charges of corruption and bribery related to a Petrobras drillship purchase.

Federal Senate vote on suspending President Dilma Rousseff.
Ballot	12 May 2016
Required majority	41 out of 81 (51%)
Yes	55 / 81
No	22 / 81
Not voting	1 / 81
Absentees	3 / 81

Party	Votes	%	Seats	
Party	Votes	%	For	Against
Brazilian Democratic Movement Party	15	19.48	13	2
Brazilian Social Democracy Party	11	14.29	11	0
Workers' Party	11	14.29	0	11
Brazilian Socialist Party	7	9.09	5	2
Progressive Party	6	7.79	6	0
Democrats	4	5.19	4	0
Party of the Republic	4	5.19	4	0
Social Democratic Party	4	5.19	3	1
Brazilian Labour Party	3	3.90	1	2
Democratic Labour Party	3	3.90	2	1
Brazilian Republican Party	1	1.30	1	0
Christian Labour Party	1	1.30	1	0
Communist Party of Brazil	1	1.30	0	1
Green Party	1	1.30	1	0
Social Christian Party	1	1.30	1	0
Sustainability Network	1	1.30	0	1
Popular Socialist Party	1	1.30	1	0
Independent	2	2.60	1	1
Total	77	100.00	55	22
Blank votes	1	1.28		
Registered voters/turnout	81	–		
Source: Correio do Lago

== Acting president ==
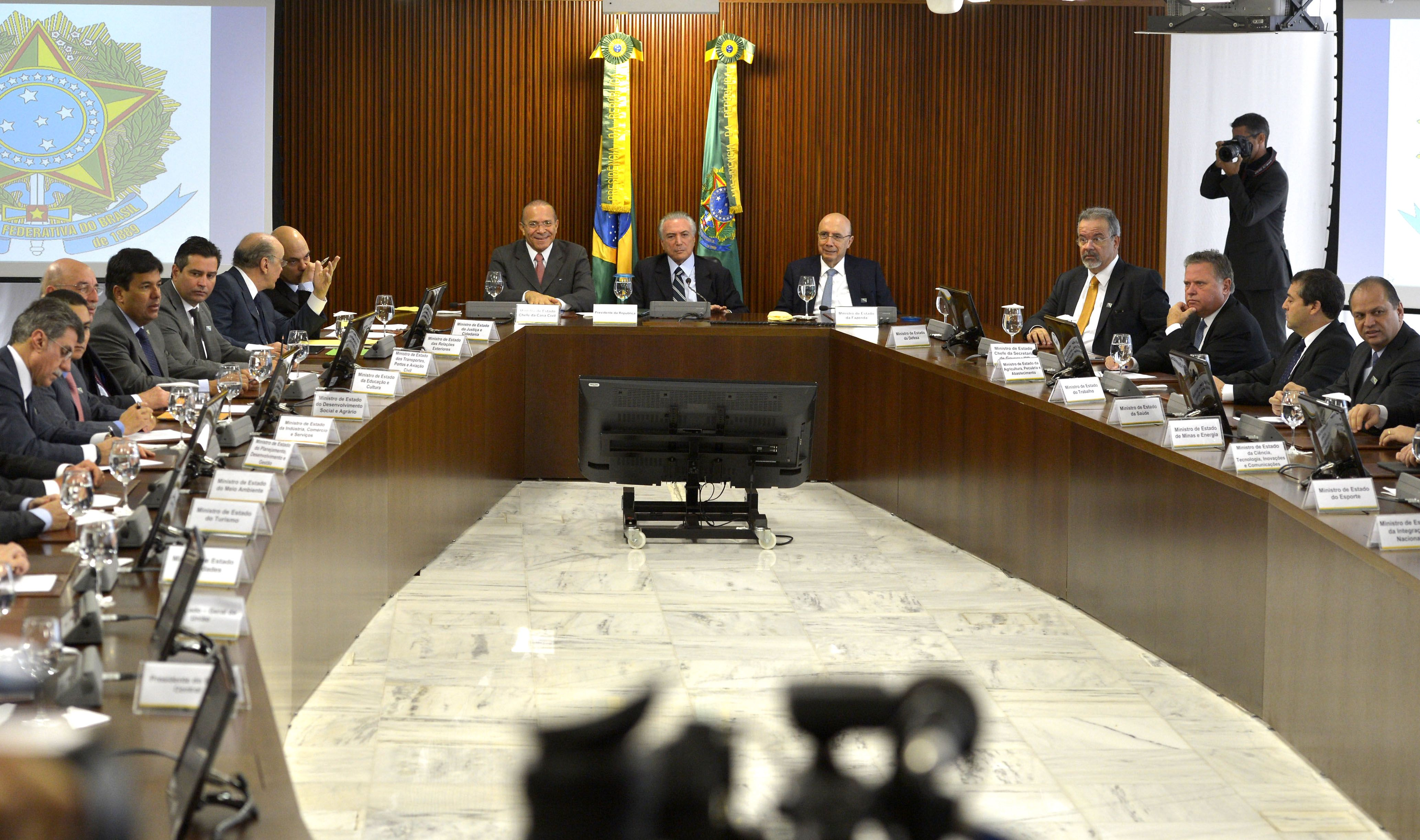
Michel Temer in his first ministerial meeting on 13 May 2016

In the Brazilian political system, the president and vice president run on the same ticket but have constitutionally separate terms. Michel Temer, who was president of the Chamber during the Fernando Henrique Cardoso presidency from 1995 to 2003, is a member of the Brazilian Democratic Movement Party (PMDB), which announced it was running against the Rousseff government in March 2016. According to the Guardian,

"...for those desperate for change, Temer represents salvation. Others, more concerned about the country's fragile democracy, believe he is the perpetrator of a coup."

A separate proposal sought to impeach Temer, the official process having started on 6 April 2016 when Cunha formed a commission to investigate one impeachment request among the five made against Temer.

In March 2017, former Odebrecht Group CEO Marcelo Odebrecht, as part of a plea bargain for leniency, said before the Superior Electoral Court Judge Herman Benjamin, that PMDB and PT slush funds received payments of R$150 million (US$48 million) from Odebrecht's construction conglomerate for the 2014 re-election campaign in 2014, and that at least a third of the money originated from corrupt practices. Odebrecht was jailed in June 2015 for corruption uncovered by Operation Car Wash.

=== Public opinion ===
A CNT/MDA poll published on 8 June 2016, indicated that only 11.3% of Brazilians approved while 28% disapproved of the acting government of President Temer. For 30.2% of respondents, Temer's government is ordinary, while 30.5% gave no answer. The survey also showed that 46.6% of Brazilians believed that the corruption in Temer's government could equal that in Rousseff's government. 28.3% believed that corruption could be less and the remaining 18.6% estimated that it could be even greater. Regarding the lawfulness of the process of impeachment, 61.5% agreed with the conduct of the process, 33.3% answered negatively and 5.2% didn't answer. CNT/MDA polled 2,002 people in 137 municipalities in 25 federative units between 2 and 5 June. CNT/MDA reported the poll as 95% reliable with a 2% margin of error.

An Ipsos poll in early July 2016 investigated what outcome most Brazilians were hoping for, with mixed results: 16% of Brazilians preferred Temer in office; 20% said that Rousseff should be acquitted and finish her four-year mandate; and 52% said that whoever assumed the presidency should call new elections for president. However, holding new elections would only be possible with a 3/5 majority in both houses of Congress. Alternatively, both could have been removed from office, depending on the outcome of a lawsuit filed in the Superior Electoral Court by the PSDB, party of Aécio Neves, the defeated candidate in the 2014 presidential elections, whose suit alleged electoral crime by the political alliance of Rousseff-Temer involving donations from the companies implicated in Operation Car Wash.

== Impeachment trial ==
After the Senate vote to suspend Rousseff's presidential powers and duties, subsequent procedure required new citations, new defense, appointing witnesses and producing evidence for preparation of the final report, which first of all had to be reviewed by a committee and then the entire Senate, each requiring a simple majority to confirm that the charges were well-founded. After that, the debate over conviction or acquittal began, requiring a two-thirds majority of the Senate, which proceedings were chaired by Ricardo Lewandowski. This eventually resulted in Rousseff's permanent removal, the appeal of which was denied by the court.

=== Rousseff's defense ===
Rousseff had 20 days to present a preliminary written defense for the trial in the Senate and Rousseff's lawyer José Eduardo Cardozo did so on 1 June 2016.

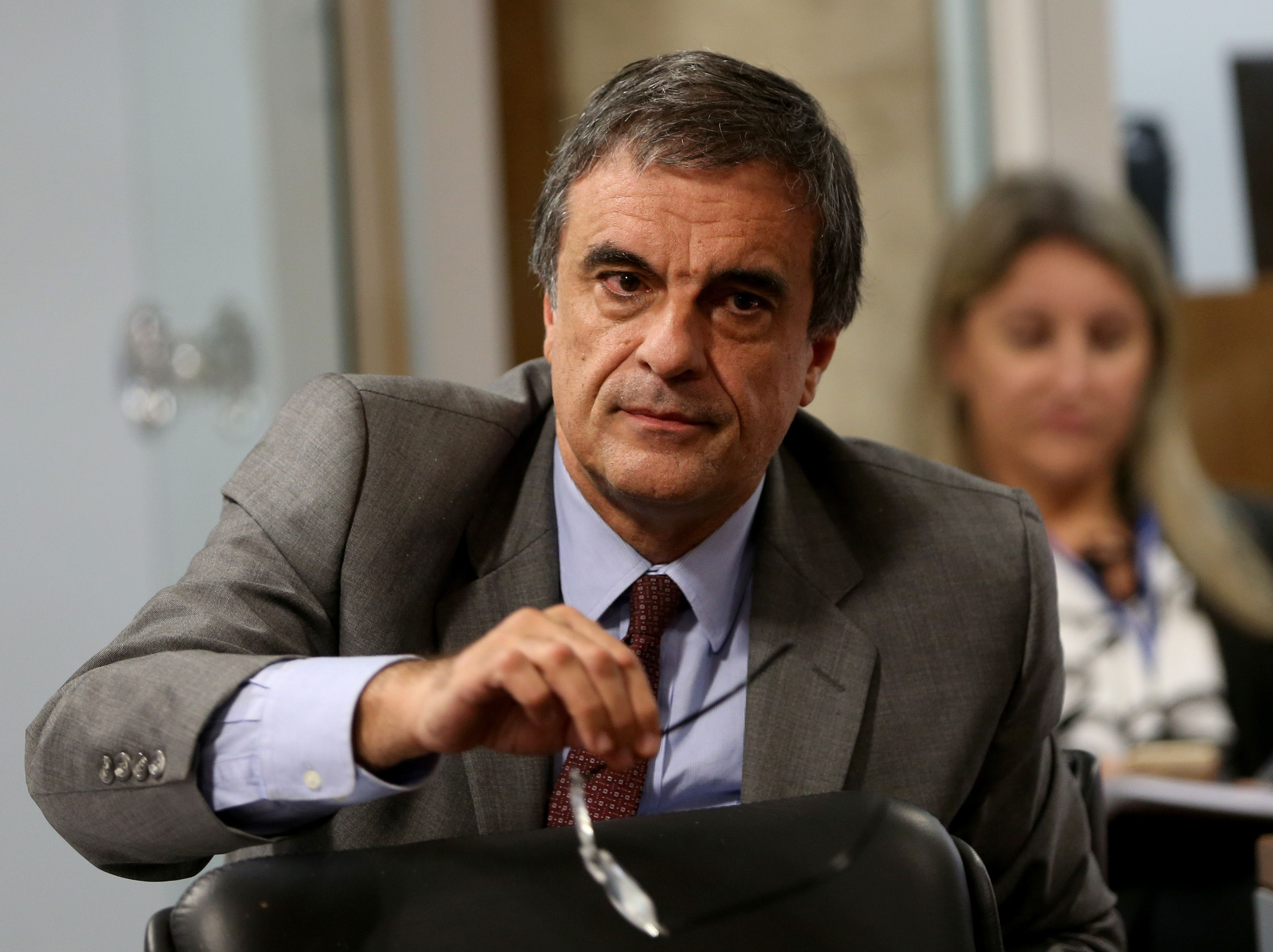
José Eduardo Cardozo, lawyer who represented Rousseff

His 370-page filing said that the president had not committed the alleged crimes and that Rousseff's impeachment "was solely and exclusively aimed at ending Operation Car Wash." Cardozo submitted as evidence transcripts of a recorded telephone conversation between José Sérgio Machado, former president of Petrobras subsidiary Transpetro, and Senator Romero Jucá, an influential politician in the PMDB. Published by the newspaper Folha de S. Paulo, the conversation convinced Cardozo that the two were trying to prevent the investigation from widening, due to the risk to both of being caught up in it, and suggested that Rousseff's impeachment could have been part of an agreement aimed at preventing (and possibly later stopping) the Operation Car Wash investigations. Jucá's lawyer said that his client never thought to interfere in Operation Car Wash and that the dialogue did not suggest that he did. Jucá, who had been appointed Planning Minister by Temer, also denied ever attempting to obstruct the investigation, and after speaking with Temer on 23 May, said that he had no intention of resigning. However, the next day Jucá stepped down after eleven days in office.

=== Committee meetings ===
==== Work plan and preliminary requests ====
On 25 May 2016, Senator Antônio Anastasia, rapporteur of the Special Committee of Impeachment 2016 (CEI 2016), presented a work plan for the trial. The next meeting was scheduled for 2 June, to analyze new deadlines.

The committee assessed Anastasia's report and work plan deadlines, and requests by senators, on 2 June 2016. in a session that lasted over nine hours. Anastasia proposed that final arguments be heard by 7 July. Anastasia ruled against recorded telephone conversation between Machado and Jucá being introduced into evidence, ruling it irrelevant since the charges against Rousseff were fiscal responsibility crimes and the recording was only an informal conversation and proved nothing in law. Cardozo protested that the facts cited in the recording were a primary question of the investigation, and announced on 3 June that he would appeal the decision to the president of the Supreme Court. The committee approved the work plan and deadlines on 6 June.

On 7 June, Lewandowski denied the appeal filed by Cardozo to append the recording of Sérgio Machado, citing a precedent that evidence of that type is confidential until the beginning of a formal investigation. Machado was arrested and introduced the recording of the conversation during his interrogation. The subject under appeal had been discussed in prior decisions of the Court. Lewandowski also denied an appeal by senator Aloysio Nunes, former member of the committee, to reduce the number of witnesses.

At 2 June meeting, the committee had established that eight witnesses would be heard for each of the six supplemental budget decrees against Rousseff, both for the prosecution and for the defense, i.e. a total of 48 witnesses for each side, with each decree considered separately. Nunes contended that the six decrees should be considered a single entity, to be added to the so-called "tax pedaling", so that the number of witnesses to be heard could be reduced to 16.

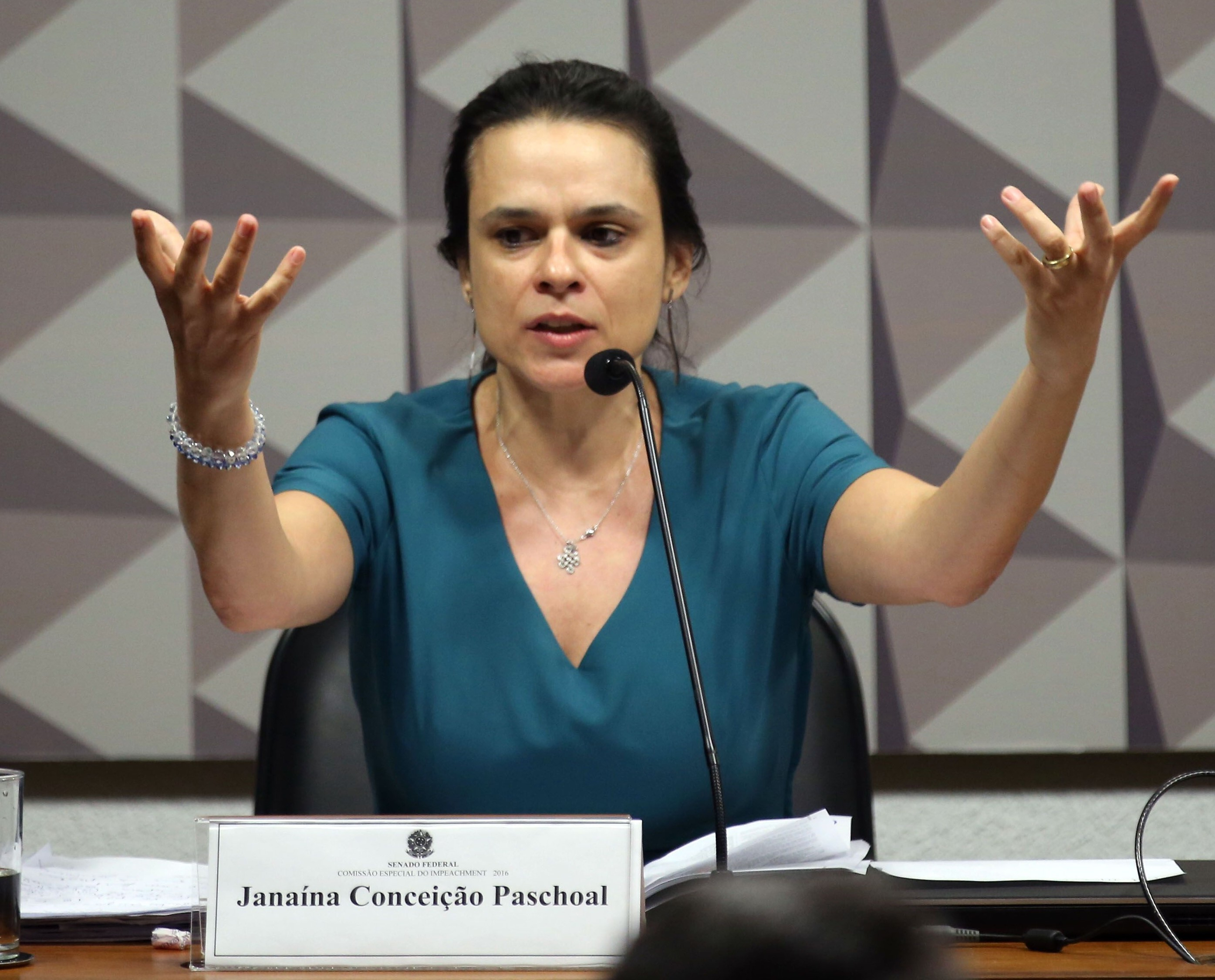
Janaína Conceição Paschoal, prosecutor

On 8 June, the committee accepted a request by both defense and prosecution reducing to four the number of supplemental budget decrees to be considered in the trial. Thus, the number of witnesses in the process was reduced to forty. Since each charge entitled eight witnesses, the defense of Rousseff could introduce up to 32 witnesses for the four decrees and eight for the "tax pedaling" charge. The prosecution would be entitled to the same number. The decision to reduce the charges was supported by a report produced at the House of Representatives, which considered that two decrees signed by Rousseff without approval of Congress were neutral from a fiscal perspective, once the primary sources and financial expenses listed in the documents were equivalent.

==== Witnesses ====
The hearings began on 8 June 2016 with four prosecution witnesses. The prosecutors were Janaína Paschoal and Miguel Reale Junior; Rousseff was represented by her lawyer, José Eduardo Cardozo.

Fraud is the will to, free and consciously, to practice the misconduct and get the result. And that's what the President did. She edited the decrees by a free and conscious mode to increase costs, that could not increased by a decree. She should send a bill.

— Julio Marcelo de Oliveira, Federal Court of Accounts (TCU), Agência Brasil.

Oliveira, procurator of the Federal Court of Accounts (TCU), said that in April 2015 TCU identified the recidivist fiscal misconduct, so-called "tax pedaling", immediately rejected. There was no previous understanding to modify the rules and the consensus, and every time that the TCU has ruled, it had disapproved the conduct adopted by Rousseff. He reiterated that the President acted intentionally to borrow from public banks, and acted "coercively" in these operations. This, in his opinion, was serious, and forbidden by the fiscal responsibility law. The practice, he said, went on for years, including throughout the year 2015.

Antonio Carlos Costa D'avila Carvalho, the auditor of TCU, said that the Rousseff's fiscal practices were unprecedented and caused serious outcomes. Adriano Pereira de Paula, credit operations manager of the National Treasury, and Otavio Ladeira de Medeiros, deputy secretary of the National Treasury, also testified during this session. Medeiros said that the delays of the federal government in the transfers to subsidize the loans of the Plan Safra were regularized throughout 2015 – thus confirmed what had been said before by de Paula – and as for the debt stock, the decision of the Federal Court of Accounts was awaited so that it could make the payment.

Prosecution witnesses Tiago Alves de Gouveia Lins Dutra and Leonardo Rodrigues Albernaz, both TCU auditors, testified on 13 June. Tiago Dutra said that Rousseff created overdrafts with public banks in 2015 that had already observed in 2014. A TCU report indicated a delay of eleven months in transferring to banks an amount of R$2.6 billion, and five months in transferring R$3 billion related to the operations. For principal and interest, until December 2015, the government have been paid R$15 billion, of which R$2 billion were related to interest. Albernaz said that more than fifty auditors had carried out an analysis of Rousseff accounts and concluded unanimously that her administration has made "the most reckless management" of public finances since the Fiscal Responsibility Law was enacted in May 2000.

Committee President Raimundo Lira announced the decision of the President of the Supreme Court, Ricardo Lewandowski, authorizing an audit requested by the defense. Lira designated a board consisting of three experts, granting to prosecution, defense and Senators 48 hours to formulate questions and indicate technical assistants, as well as 24 hours to refute the appointed experts, fixing also a ten-day deadline for the completion of the audit.

I don't understand that it was a credit operation, but a rendering of services. At no time that the Union [Government] pays to bank was directly related to what the producers has received. The producers received from the bank itself. The Union participation doesn't characterize a credit operation between the Union and public banks.

— Gilson Bittencourt, former National Secretary of Planning and Strategic Investment, Agência Brasil.

On 14 June, the first defense witnesses testified. They were former Secretary of Planning and Strategic Investment, Gilson Bittencourt, and former Secretary of Agricultural Policy of the Ministry of Agriculture, André Nassar. Bittencourt said that there was no credit operation between the Government and public banks and also denied that there was a delay in paying interest to public banks in 2015. According to him, the debit to be paid in 2016 came due only at the time of collection by the banks, every six months. Nassar said that the Bank of Brazil had an interest in "circulating money", by lending to producers, and even in getting the transfers delayed by the government. He also said that, as Secretary of Agricultural Policy and from the point of view of the agricultural sector, this was important to avoid a disruption that, had it occurred, would have generated serious outcomes to the sector.

On 15 June, former Deputy Secretary of the Federal Budget Office, Cilair Rodrigues de Abreu, former Secretary of Budget and Administration for the Ministry of Social Security, José Geraldo França Diniz, and Consultant for the Ministry of Planning, Budget, and Management, Walter Baere de Araújo Filho, all testified. Rodrigues said that the understanding of the TCU before 2015 had always been that the future target could be used by the budget secretary in the publication of their reports. This understanding did not change, he said, until 2015. Diniz testified that due to the complexity of supplemental budget decrees, the documents are reviewed by experts and that while Rousseff signed, it would have been impossible for herself to analyze in detail 200 pages of attachments, calculations and spreadsheets. Walter Baere said that the TCU had never issued a formal opinion concerning the illegality of supplemental budget decrees by the President, and that the TCU had the specific legal duty to raise an alert whenever there is a possibility of the non-attainment of fiscal targets.

Former Executive Secretary of the Ministry of Education, Luiz Cláudio Costa, former Assistant Executive Secretary of the Ministry of Education, Wagner Vilas Boas, Assistant Secretary of Planning and Budget of the Ministry of Education, Iara Ferreira Pinho, and Director of the Department of Economic Programs of the Secretary of Federal Budget, Clayton Luiz Montes, all testified on 16 June. According to Luiz Claudio Costa, the supplemental budget decree for the Ministry of Education was important for the management, enabling several sectors linked to the Ministry, such as universities, institutes and others, to ensure their budget met immediate needs. Vilas Boas explained that it was not appropriate for the Ministry of Education to evaluate the impact of the credit opening for obtaining the primary balance target. He said that the sectorial authority – in this case the agencies of the Ministry – makes a request for supplemental budget, but that this is subject to policy guidance and technical supervision by the budget agency. Both, Wagner Vilas Boas and Iara Pinho, said they could not give an opinion on the compatibility of the signed supplementary decrees and the current fiscal target since their functions don't allow them to conduct an analysis of the achievement of the target. Concerning these statements, the prosecution pointed out that the technicians were not able to explain specifically the possible crime of responsibility. "The witnesses left show that they are unaware the facts. Our claim is that the evidence shall be excused," said prosecution lawyer, Janaína Paschoal, after the testimony of Iara Pinho.

Clayton Luiz Montes said that "the government has followed the new understanding of the TCU by October 2015. Since that time, we were not sent any credit decrees". This, nevertheless, conflicted with the statements of TCU auditors—that there was no previous understanding to modify the rules.

On 17 June, former Minister of Planning, Budget and Management, Nelson Barbosa, former Minister of Education, José Henrique Paim, Director of the Department of Infrastructure Programs of the Federal Budget Secretary, Zarak de Oliveira Ferreira, Analyst of Planning and Budget of the Ministry of Planning, Budget and Management, Antonio José Chatack Carmelo, and Planning and Budget Analyst of the Federal Budget Office, Georgimar Martiniano de Sousa, testified. Nelson Barbosa said that the additional credit decrees issued by President Rousseff from June to August 2015 did not prevent the fulfillment of the fiscal target approved by Congress in early 2015 and, since it was a supplemental credit that had no impact on the target, was not considered a target of primary balance, but to give more autonomy to the allocation of a value already available. Henrique Paim said that the decrees were essential to the functioning of various sectors of Education, including scientific research and operation of universities. Moreover, according to the former minister, the additional credits are often edited based on revenue generation, provided by "budget units", linked to the Ministry. Also the technicians Zarak de Oliveira, Chatack Carmelo and Georgimar Martiniano, have not seen incompatibility of supplemental decrees with the fiscal target.

From 20 to 24 June, there were five meetings, with hearings of fifteen witnesses called by the defense.

On 20 June, former Deputy Chief for Legal Affairs of Staff of the Presidency Ivo da Motta Azevedo Correa, former Minister of Education Renato Janine Ribeiro Director of the Department of Social Programs of the Secretary of Federal Budget Felipe Daruich Neto, and former Deputy Executive Secretary of the Staff of the Presidency Bruno Moretti, all testified. Ivo Correa said that an alert of the TCU was not a decision of the Court, and thus, the government relied on previous jurisprudence to edit the decrees. Janine Ribeiro said that no alert was received from the TCU about irregularities in the supplemental budget decrees when Minister of Education. Daruich Neto said that, at no time was there any intentional misconduct and that it was impracticable for the President to evaluate all decrees before signing them.

Former Minister of the Secretary of Human Rights Pepe Vargas, former Minister of Planning, Budget and Management Miriam Belchior (who was also the former President of Caixa Econômica Federal), Planning and Budget Analyst Orlando Magalhães da Cunha, and Coordinator of Budget and Finance of the Ministry of Justice Marcelo Minghelli, testified on 21 June. The former Minister Pepe Vargas asserted that the supplemental credit to the Secretary of Human Rights was derived not just from treasury resources, but from surplus funds obtained through donations by individuals and corporations. Mirian Belchior said that the supplemental budget decrees, by which Rousseff was indicted were lawful and that it was impossible to increase the budgetary contingency that was made in 2015.

Planning and Budget Analyst and General Coordinator of Technology and Information of the Federal Budget Office Robson Azevedo Rung, Secretary of Institutional Organization of the Ministry of Defence Luiz Antonio de Souza Cordeiro, and Superior Labor Court representative Luciano Carlos de Almeida testified on 22 June. Azevedo Rung said that the Federal Budget Office received a new interpretation from TCU only in 2015, concerning the procedures that were ever well settled.

Also at this session, the Committee approved a new timetable for the trial – on 6 July, the testimony of Rousseff, who could be represented by her lawyer, José Eduardo Cardozo; from 7 to 12 July, final arguments of the prosecution; and from 13 to 27 July, final arguments of the defence. On 9 August, there was to be discussion and voting on the report in plenary; and 22 August was the estimated date for the final judgement.

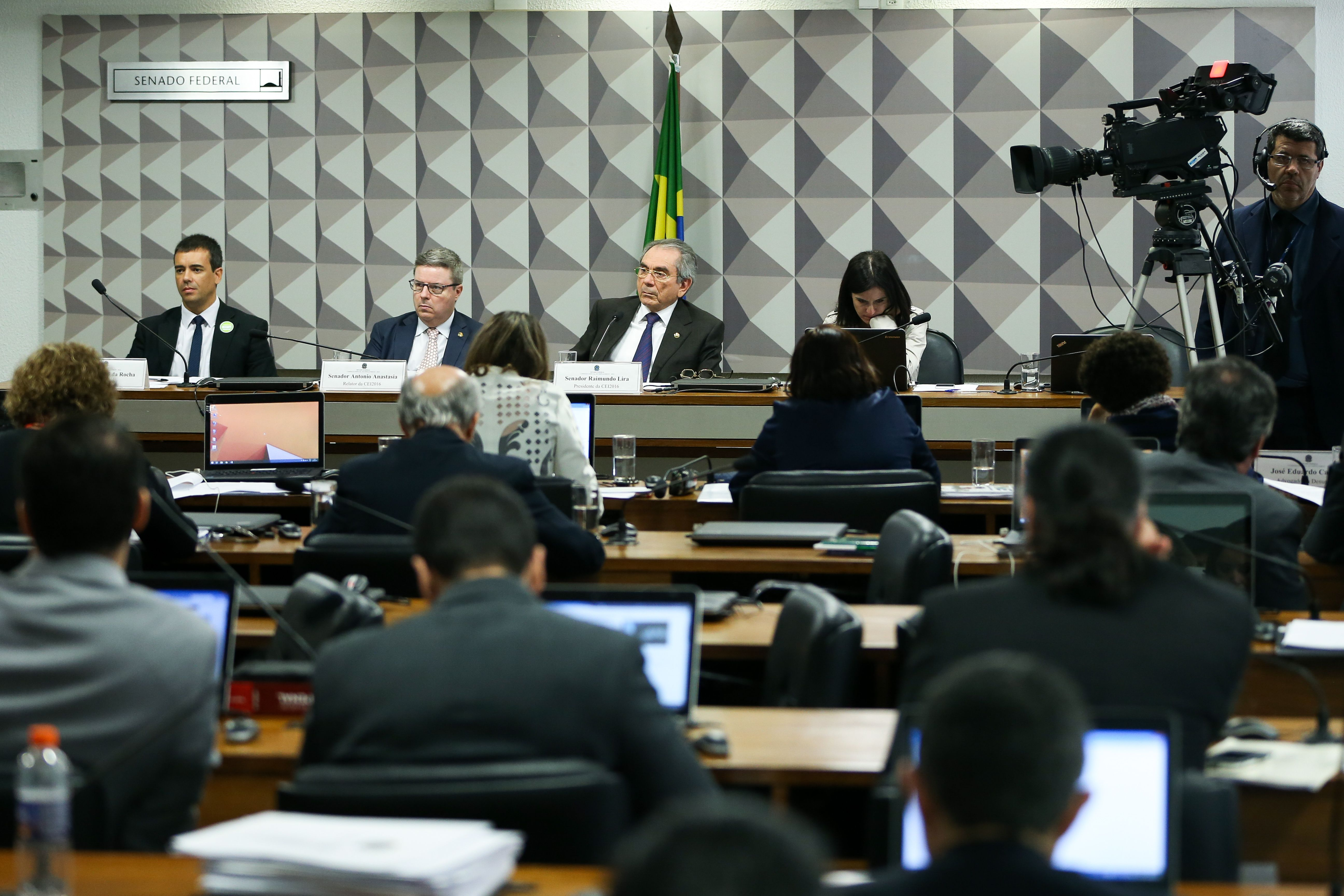
Committee meeting on 23 June 2016

The Deputy Secretary of Planning, Budget and Administration of the Ministry of Science, Technology and Innovation Anderson Lozi da Rocha and former Federal Budget Secretary Esther Dweck testified on 23 June. Dweck denied that the supplemental budget decrees in 2015 had contributed to the breach of the target for primary surplus for that year.

Two more witnesses (former Executive Secretary of the Ministry of Labor and Employment Francisco José Pontes Ibiapina and the Director of Special Programs of the Secretary of Federal Budget Marcos de Oliveira Ferreira) testified on 24 June. Pontes Ibiapina said that the supplemental budget decrees were published to aid programs such as the transfer of resources to States and Municipalities, by the National Employment System and other programs.

Former Ministry of Agrarian Development Patrus Ananias testified on 27 June. Ananias said that he did not acknowledge the "tax pedalling" and the resources were transferred from the Bank of Brazil directly to producers at subsidized interest rates, due to the attention that agriculture deserved.

On 28 June were heard Maria Fernanda Ramos Coelho, former Executive Secretary of the Ministry of Agrarian Development; Aldo Rebelo, former Ministry of Defence; Luís Inácio Adams, former General's Office attorney; and Antônio Carlos Stangherlin Rebelo, who was responsible for analysis of supplemental credits on the National Justice Council. Maria Fernanda said that the delay in the payment of interest rate equalization of the Plan Safra (government's plan to support agriculture) for 2015, did not configure a credit operation, since the non-compliance was not subject to penalty payment in the contract terms. According to former Secretary, the values were only monetarily adjusted. The prosecution lawyer Janaína Paschoal rejected the claims of Maria Fernanda and said that the remuneration per interest rate SELIC (a benchmark interest rate of the Brazilian economy) is a proof that there was a credit operation. The prosecution reiterated that this statement confirmed the infringement materially, she concluded. Aldo Rebelo rejected the accusations that the government spent wantonly in 2015, and that year was characterized by fiscal adjustments and efforts to reduce public spending.

On 29 June were heard João Luiz Guadagnin, Director of the Department of Finance and Production Protection of the Ministry of Agrarian Development; Marcel Mascarenhas dos Santos, Prosecutor of the Central Bank; Fernando Rocha, Deputy Head of the Economic Department of the Central Bank; and Paulo José dos Reis Souza, Finance and Control Analyst and Fiscal Policy Secretary on the National Treasury Secretary.

The witness hearings ended on 29 June. A total of 44 witnesses were heard, six convened by prosecution and 38 by the defense. At the end of the witnesses hearings phase, both the prosecution and the defense lawyers said they were confident of their respective theses. Prosecution lawyer Janaína Paschoal criticized the actions of Rousseff's defense because of the large number of witnesses called. Defense lawyer José Eduardo Cardozo also expressed confidence, but said that the process had political undertones and that this might interfere with the result. He also pointed out that some senators refused to question the witnesses because there was already a predetermined outcome prior to the completion of work.

==== Auditors' report ====
The board of experts designated at 13 June session, by committee president Raimundo Lira, was heard on 5 July. This board had audited the documents, as requested by the defense and authorized by Lewandowski. They found that the delays in the transfer of payments to the public banks did indeed constitute loans. However, they avoided considering whether the President intended this and said that this judgement should be made by the senators. Also heard were the assistant to the prosecution, Selene Péres Nunes and the assistant to the defense, Ricardo Lodi Ribeiro. Nunes said that there was willful misconduct by the President, since the operations had been concealed via the accounting and the fact that the government had later issued a provisional measure allowing payment of the debts. Ribeiro said that the supplemental budget decrees were submitted for her signature by the technical departments of the ministries, and her participation, as demonstrated in the report, was limited to signing them.

==== Rousseff interrogatory and final arguments ====
Rousseff was scheduled to be questioned on 6 July, but she declined to attend and sent a letter that was read by Cardozo. Rousseff defended herself, claiming that she was the victim of a conspiracy—that "a number of political forces" saw her as a risk and that those who "failed to acknowledge the opposition's defeat [in the 2014 elections]" wanted a different political party for the country. She also said she acted in bona fide and asked lawmakers to "get rid of personal bias". The final arguments were delivered on 12 July and 28 July respectively, for preparation of the final report by rapporteur Antonio Anastasia.

==== Final report: discussion and approval ====
Anastasia submitted the final report on 2 August, concluding that Rousseff was culpable. On 3 August, the document was discussed by the committee. João Correia Serra, prosecution lawyer in lieu, praised Anastasia's report and stressed the known "centralizing temperament" of Rousseff, making it seem unlikely Rousseff had been unaware of or had not directly ordered the actions of which she was accused. Countering, Cardozo said that he was sure that Anastasia's report did not evince that Rousseff had committed crimes, and accused the rapporteur, despite his aptitude and brilliance, of managing his actions within the opinion of his party. On 4 August, the report was voted on and approved by 14–5 votes – ending the work of the Committee – followed by voting on the Senate floor on 9 August, chaired by Supreme Federal Court president Ricardo Lewandowski.

=== Senate vote on the final report ===
At a long session of the Senate – from 9 to 10 August – Anastasia's final report was approved and by a 59–21 vote, the indictments against Rousseff were upheld. This marked the end of the penultimate phase of the impeachment process, called pronunciation, which would determine the final judgement in the Senate, beginning on 25 August. In this judgement, two-thirds of 81 senators were necessary to remove the President and make her ineligible for office for another eight years with effect from 1 January 2019, when her second term would have ended.

=== Deciding Senate vote ===
The last phase of the trial consisted of four steps:

1. Cross-examination of witnesses by Lewandowski and the senators (eight witnesses, two called by the prosecution and six by the defense), followed by cross-examination by prosecution and defense lawyers.
2. Cross-examination of Rousseff by senators,
3. Final arguments by prosecution and defense.
4. Vote by senators.

==== Cross-examination of witnesses ====
On 25 August, the prosecution called two witnesses, Julio Marcelo de Oliveira, procurator of the TCU, and author of the report recommending the rejection of the 2014 accounts, and Antonio Carlos Costa D'avila Carvalho Júnior, auditor of the TCU. Oliveira was questioned as an expert, not as an evidentiary, witness, as ruled by Lewandowski, after Cardozo accused Oliveira of making a report based on a biased understanding. He denied this, saying that he only fulfilled a recommendation to adopt a "less tolerant" rule that came from TCU. Oliveira asserted that Rousseff broke budget laws in 2014 and also in 2015. In his status as informant, his complaints could not be considered as evidence, but as technical information.

The next prosecution witness questioned, D'Avila Carvalho, asserted that Rousseff "disguised" the accounting and was responsible for delaying transfers to state banks. Cardozo tried to disqualify this witness, accusing him of bias because he had helped Oliveira to draft the TCU report, "clearly an unethical situation that violates the principle of impartiality." However, Lewandowski overruled this motion.

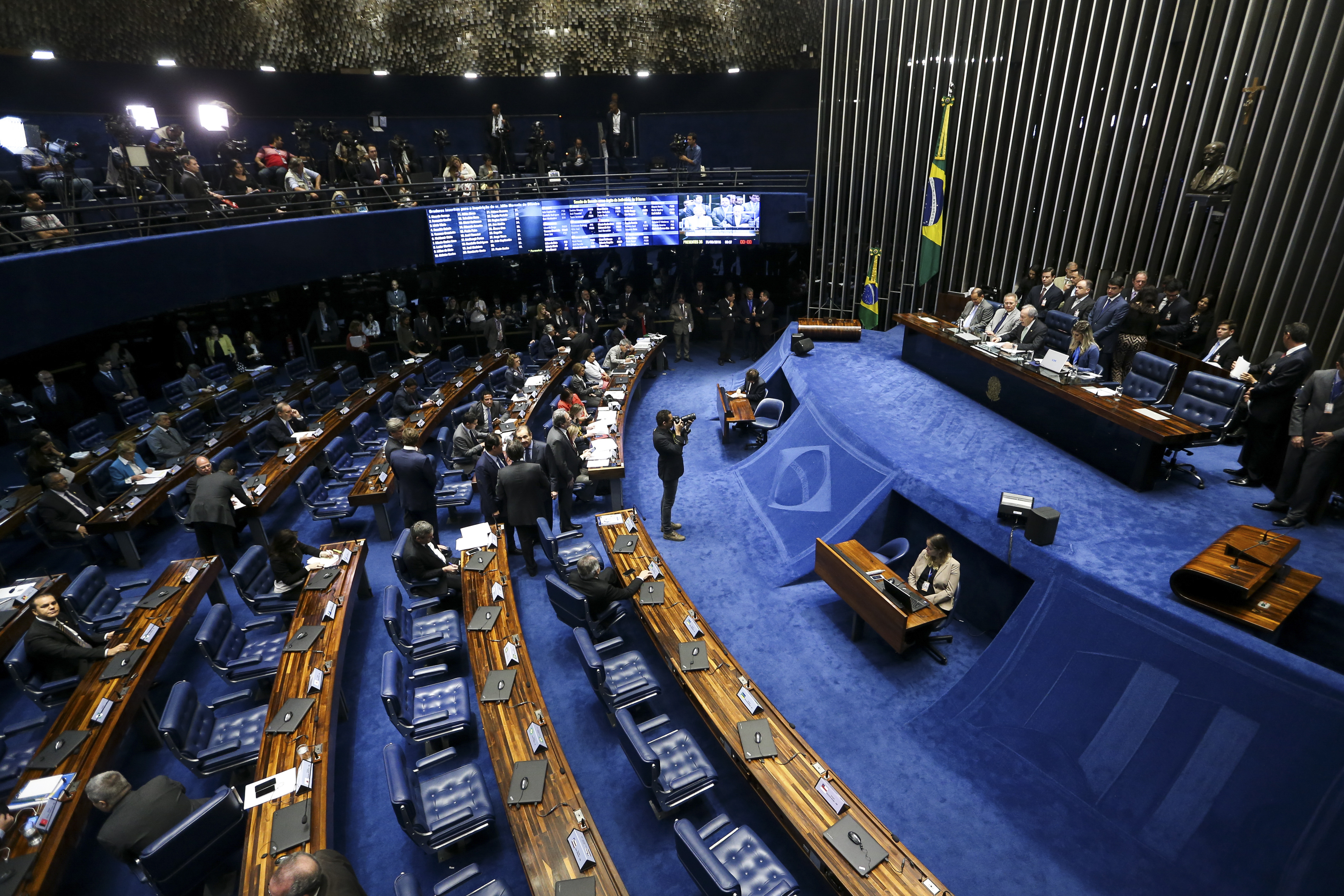
Impeachment trial begins on 25 August 2016

Cross-examination continued the next day when the defense called six witnesses:

- Luiz Gonzaga Belluzzo, economist,
- Geraldo Luiz Mascarenhas Prado, legal advisor,
- Luiz Cláudio Costa, former Secretary of the Ministry of Education,
- Nelson Barbosa, former Minister of Planning, Budget and Management
- Esther Dweck, former Secretary of Federal Budget
- Ricardo Ribeiro Lodi, Law professor at the State University of Rio de Janeiro.

Dweck was found by Lewandowski to have a conflict of interest, since she was being contracted for the office of Gleisi Hoffmann, one of the senators opposed to impeachment. Gonzaga Belluzzo and Ribeiro Lodi testified as expert witnesses.

Belluzo said that removal of an elected official should require very special care and could only be done in extreme situations, and that the trial wasn't facing one.

Mascarenhas Prado said that in signing decrees Rousseff had relied on subordinates who vouched for the signings' legality, adding that she "was dismissed for issuing a decree to follow a determination of the National Justice Council". Cláudio Costa said the supplementary credit decrees were used for educational programs. Senator Cássio Cunha Lima refuted this, stating that the crime was not in the expansion of universities and technical schools, but in the lack of congressional authorization for the decrees.

Barbosa said that decrees provide more leeway for the administration of funds when the budget is limited, and are used by experienced officials. Pro-impeachment senators insisted that the decrees had aggravated the economic crisis facing the country. Barbosa countered that the crisis was due to various internal and external factors. At last, Ribeiro Lodi stated that the decrees issued by the President in July and August 2015 were not, until the time of the trial, considered violations by TCU and that when they were issued, current understanding did not exist.

==== Cross-examination of Rousseff by senators and final arguments by lawyers ====
I know I will be judged, but my conscience is clear. I did not commit a crime.

— Dilma Rousseff,

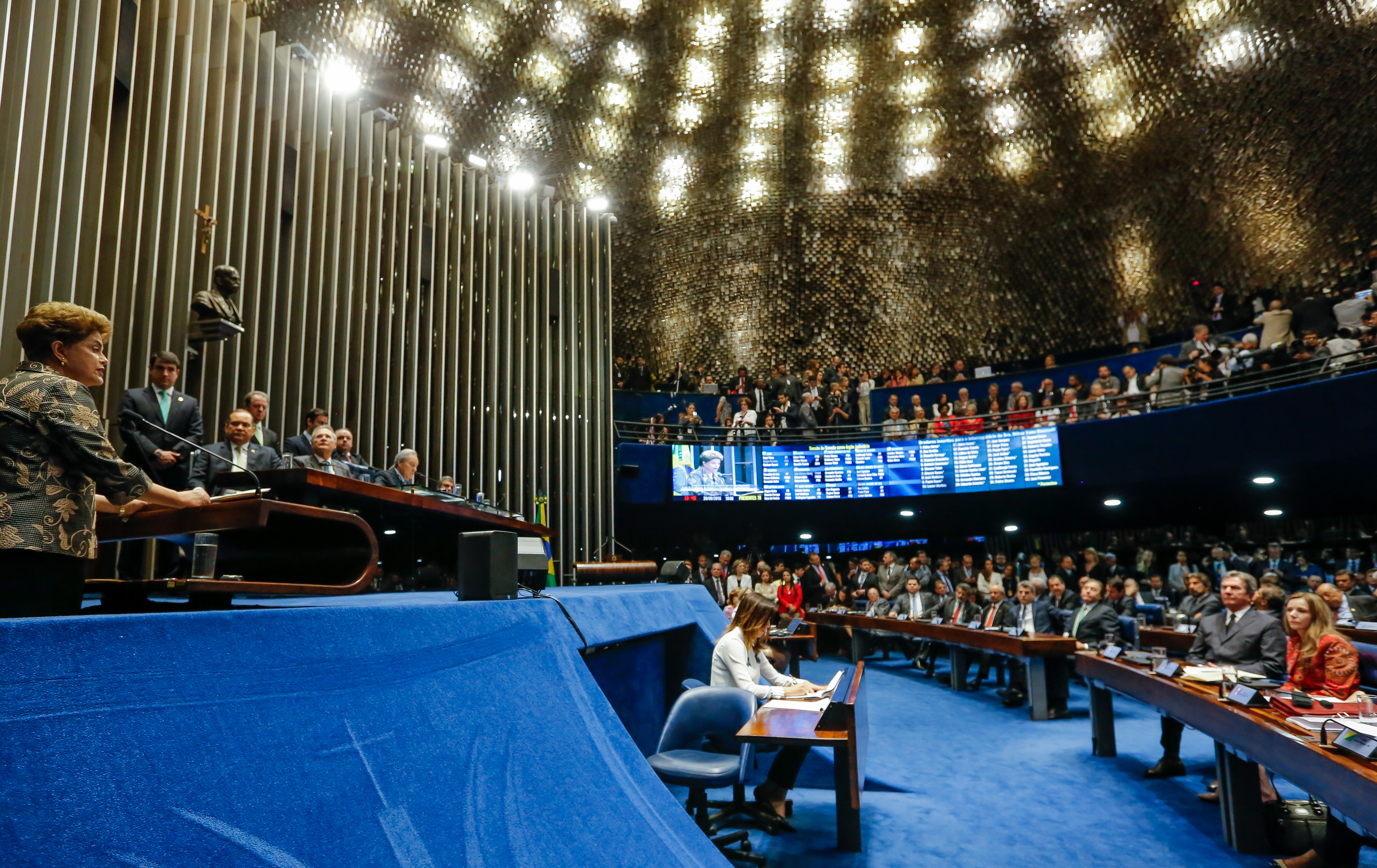
Dilma Rousseff at the Senate on 29 August 2016

Rousseff spoke in her own defense before the Senate on 29 August for 45 minutes, proclaiming her innocence and decrying the impeachment process, noting that many of her accusers faced worse charges than she. "Everybody knows this impeachment process opened with explicit blackmail by the former head of the lower house, Eduardo Cunha," she said. She then answered questions from senators for more than twelve hours. She explained that she had needed to make difficult choices on the budget, to address declining revenue and a refusal by opposition in Congress to work with her. She compared her situation with other Brazilian presidents pursued by their opponents, including João Goulart, a leftist ousted in a military coup in 1964, and replaced by a 21-year dictatorship.

She also compared the effort to impeach her to the torture she endured after agents of the military dictatorship arrested and jailed her as an urban guerrilla. Rousseff called the impeachment proceedings a new type of coup and evoked the breakdown of Brazilian democracy in the 1960s before the military coup. Senator Ana Amélia Lemos in reply expressed respect for her personal history but said that the senators were not there to judge her biography, but the actions of her government. She said Rousseff had broken the law by manipulating the budget to hide economic problems.

We are not dealing with a little accounting problem; we are dealing with fraud.

— Janaína Paschoal,

The proceedings resumed on 30 August with final arguments of the prosecution and defense, followed by speeches from the senators—the speeches lasted twelve hours, ending about 02:30 am on the 31st.

==== Senate vote ====
The Senate found President Dilma Rousseff guilty of responsibility crimes and administrative misconduct regarding the federal budget and removed her from office after a vote of 61–20 on 31 August 2016. In a separate vote on whether she should be barred from public office for eight years, senators voted 42–36 in favor. A two-thirds majority of the votes (54 of 81 senators) would have been needed, so she will be able to run for any public office again in the near future. She has vowed to do so.

Federal Senate vote on removing President Dilma Rousseff.
Ballot	31 August 2016
Required majority	54 out of 81 (66.67%)
Yes	61 / 81
No	20 / 81
Abstentions	0 / 81
Absentees	0 / 81

Federal Senate vote on turning President Dilma Rousseff ineligible for 8 years.
Ballot	31 August 2016
Required majority	54 out of 81 (66.67%)
Yes	42 / 81
No	36 / 81
Abstentions	3 / 81
Absentees	0 / 81

Party	Votes	%	Seats	
Party	Votes	%	For	Against
Brazilian Democratic Movement Party	19	23.46	17	2
Brazilian Social Democracy Party	11	13.58	11	0
Workers' Party	10	12.35	0	10
Brazilian Socialist Party	7	8.64	5	2
Progressive Party	7	8.64	6	1
Democrats	4	4.94	4	0
Party of the Republic	4	4.94	4	0
Social Democratic Party	4	4.94	3	1
Brazilian Labour Party	3	3.70	1	2
Democratic Labour Party	3	3.70	3	0
Social Christian Party	2	2.47	2	0
Brazilian Republican Party	1	1.23	1	0
Christian Labour Party	1	1.23	1	0
Communist Party of Brazil	1	1.23	0	1
Green Party	1	1.23	1	0
Popular Socialist Party	1	1.23	1	0
Sustainability Network	1	1.23	0	1
Independent	1	1.23	1	0
Total	81	100.00	61	20
Registered voters/turnout	81	–		
Source: Agência Brasil

Party	Votes	%	Seats	
Party	Votes	%	For	Against
Brazilian Democratic Movement Party	17	21.79	7	10
Brazilian Social Democracy Party	11	14.10	11	0
Workers' Party	10	12.82	0	10
Brazilian Socialist Party	7	8.97	3	4
Progressive Party	7	8.97	6	1
Democrats	3	3.85	3	0
Party of the Republic	4	5.13	1	3
Social Democratic Party	4	5.13	3	1
Brazilian Labour Party	3	3.85	1	2
Democratic Labour Party	3	3.85	1	2
Social Christian Party	2	2.56	2	0
Brazilian Republican Party	1	1.28	1	0
Christian Labour Party	1	1.28	1	0
Communist Party of Brazil	1	1.28	0	1
Green Party	1	1.28	1	0
Popular Socialist Party	1	1.28	0	1
Sustainability Network	1	1.28	0	1
Independent	1	1.28	1	0
Total	78	100.00	42	36
Blank votes	3	3.70		
Registered voters/turnout	81	–		
Source: O Globo

==== Lawsuits against the Senate judgment ====
Rousseff's defense on 1 September 2016 filed a writ of mandamus with the Supreme Court against the Senate decision to remove her from office, which the court rejected on 8 September. On 30 September, the defense filed a last appeal of the impeachment. A 493-page piece called for an annulment. "This petition is aimed at invalidating the decision-making legal act of the Senate that led to the conviction, on August 31 this year, for the crime of responsibility of Her Excellency President of the Republic, Dilma Rousseff", reads the text. The appeal, signed by José Eduardo Cardozo, was denied by the Supreme Court on 20 October.

On the other hand, the parties PSDB, DEM and PPS also decided to file a mandamus at the Supreme Court against the Senate's decision to vote separately on the loss of political rights during the impeachment trial, thereby allowing the former president to later run for public office, as opposed to the laws defining crimes of responsibility and regulating the respective trial process (impeachment law), that determines a concommitance of penalties.

== After impeachment ==
=== International reactions ===
In May 2016, just after Senate voted to suspend Rousseff's presidential powers, a New York Times editorial voiced support for Rousseff's concerns about the integrity and possible ulterior motives of the politicians who voted for her impeachment, although it considered her defense "debatable".

The South American countries of Ecuador, Bolivia and Venezuela reacted to the impeachment of the President by recalling their ambassadors. The government of Argentina declared neutrality, viewing the impeachment as an internal Brazilian affair; the Argentine Ministry of Foreign Affairs said that they recognized "the institutional process" that had taken place. Representatives from Bolivia, Costa Rica, Cuba, Ecuador, Nicaragua and Venezuela walked out during Temer's speech at the UN General Assembly on 20 September 2016. Temer defended the impeachment, and said that it occurred with "absolute respect for the constitutional order".

On 22 August, about a week before the impeachment vote, the Brazilian Senate submitted a letter to the Organization of American States (OAS) in response to a complaint from PT, that the impeachment process was an "institutional coup". OAS asked for information about this complaint and the Brazilian Senate stated in the letter that "the constitutional rules were strictly observed, objections raised, and appeals to the Supreme Court were accepted."

In a press release in early September, just after the final vote, the Inter-American Commission on Human Rights of OAS expressed concern about the impeachment procedure.

=== National reaction ===
The television coverage of the impeachment vote on 31 August 2016, was watched by 35.1 million viewers in Brazil, according to GfK research. Protests supporting the impeachment process and against Rousseff's government occurred on March 13 in all states of the country, in over 300 cities, gathering over 3.6 million people.

Rousseff's impeachment was supported by the Industrial Federation of the State of São Paulo, after internal opinion surveys. In December 2015, Rio de Janeiro's Industrial Federation also began supporting the impeachment. Moreover, the Order of Attorneys of Brazil (OAB), the Brazilian Medical Association (AMB), the General Central of Workers of Brazil (CGTB) and the Brazilian Integralist Front (FIB) positioned themselves favorable to the impeachment.

The Brazil's National Council of Christian Churches (CONIC), the Episcopal Conference (CNBB), the Landless Workers' Movement (MST), the Unified Workers' Central (CUT), the National Union of Students (UNE), the National Union of Secondary Students (UBES), the National Confederation of Agricultural Workers (CONTAG), the Homeless Workers' Movement (MTST), the Central of Workers of Brazil (CTB) and the Brazilian Gay, Lesbian, Bisexual, Travesti, Transsexual and Intersex Association (ABGLT) positioned themselves against the impeachment.

After the decision of the Senate to impeach Rousseff, protests organized by supporters of the former president took place in several Brazilian cities against the decision and calling for new elections.

=== Aftermath ===
==== Statements of Michel Temer ====
Amid the approach between the Brazilian Democratic Movement (MDB) wings and the presidential candidacy of Luiz Inácio Lula da Silva in 2022, Michel Temer statements on 21 July 2022 created a polemic. In an interview with Uol, he denied having participated in the impeachment of Dilma in 2016, saying that the president is "very honest".

There was no coup. I want to say that the former president is honest. I know, and I have been able to follow, that there is nothing that can call her corrupt. She is very honest. But there were political problems. She had difficulties in her relationship with society and with the National Congress. This set of factors took crowds to the streets

— Michel Temer,

In response, Rousseff released a note on her website accusing Temer of having articulated "one of the greatest political betrayals of recent times."

I would be grateful if Mr. Michel Temer would no longer seek to clean up his undisputed condition of coup plotter using my undisputed personal and political honesty. It is precisely this quality that despises, rejects, and repudiates an evaluation that comes from someone who articulated one of the greatest political betrayals of recent times.

— Dilma Rousseff,

According to her, her former vice president's betrayal was to the program they were elected under at the polls in 2014.

The material evidence of political betrayal is expressed in the Debt Limit Amendment, the so-called labor reform and the approval of the International Parity Price for which he had no mandate. None of these projects were in our electoral commitments, on the contrary, they were contradictory to them. It is, therefore, a betrayal of the popular vote that elected him twice.

— Dilma Rousseff,

These responses of Dilma Rousseff represented an obstacle to a potential alliance between the Brazilian Democratic Movement (MDB) and the Workers' Party (PT) into a coalition to support the candidacy of Luiz Inácio Lula da Silva, instead of Simone Tebet, in the 2022 general elections.

== In popular culture ==
A documentary released in 2019 by Netflix, titled The Edge of Democracy (Democracia em Vertigem, in Portuguese), makes a description of the impeachment of Dilma Rousseff, under the author perspective, describing the rise and fall of Presidents Lula and Dilma, the Workers' Party overthrow, and the aftermath sociopolitical crisis in country. It was produced by the Brazilian actress and filmmaker Petra Costa and was nominated for Best Documentary Feature at the 92nd Academy Awards.

Prior to this, 2018 saw the release of a documentary titled The Trial (originally titled 'O Processo') which was directed by prizewinning Brazilian/Dutch documentary maker Maria Ramos. The documentary is "wholly observational, without interviews and narrations" and "offers a behind-the-scenes inside look" in which Ramos "was granted unique access to the defence team, to left wing senators and to President Rousseff herself". According to Jay Weissberg of Variety, the documentary received an "electrified reaction amongst Brazilian expats" at the Berlin Film Festival 2018 and "serves as a crucial record of the travesty behind the impeachment hearings of Brazilian President Dilma Rousseff".

Also in 2018, Douglas Duarte released Lower House (Excelentíssimos in Portuguese) which similarly portrays the impeachment process through a fly-on-the-wall approach.

== See also ==
- 2014 Brazilian economic crisis
- Brazilian Anti-Corruption Act
- Corruption in Brazil
- Impeachment of Fernando Collor de Mello (Brazil)
- Impeachment of Fernando Lugo (Paraguay)
- Impeachment of Park Geun-hye (South Korea)
- Impeachment of Yoon Suk Yeol (South Korea)
- List of scandals in Brazil
- Mensalão scandal
- Presidency of Dilma Rousseff
