= Miguel Reale Júnior =

Brazilian jurist, politician, professor and lawyer

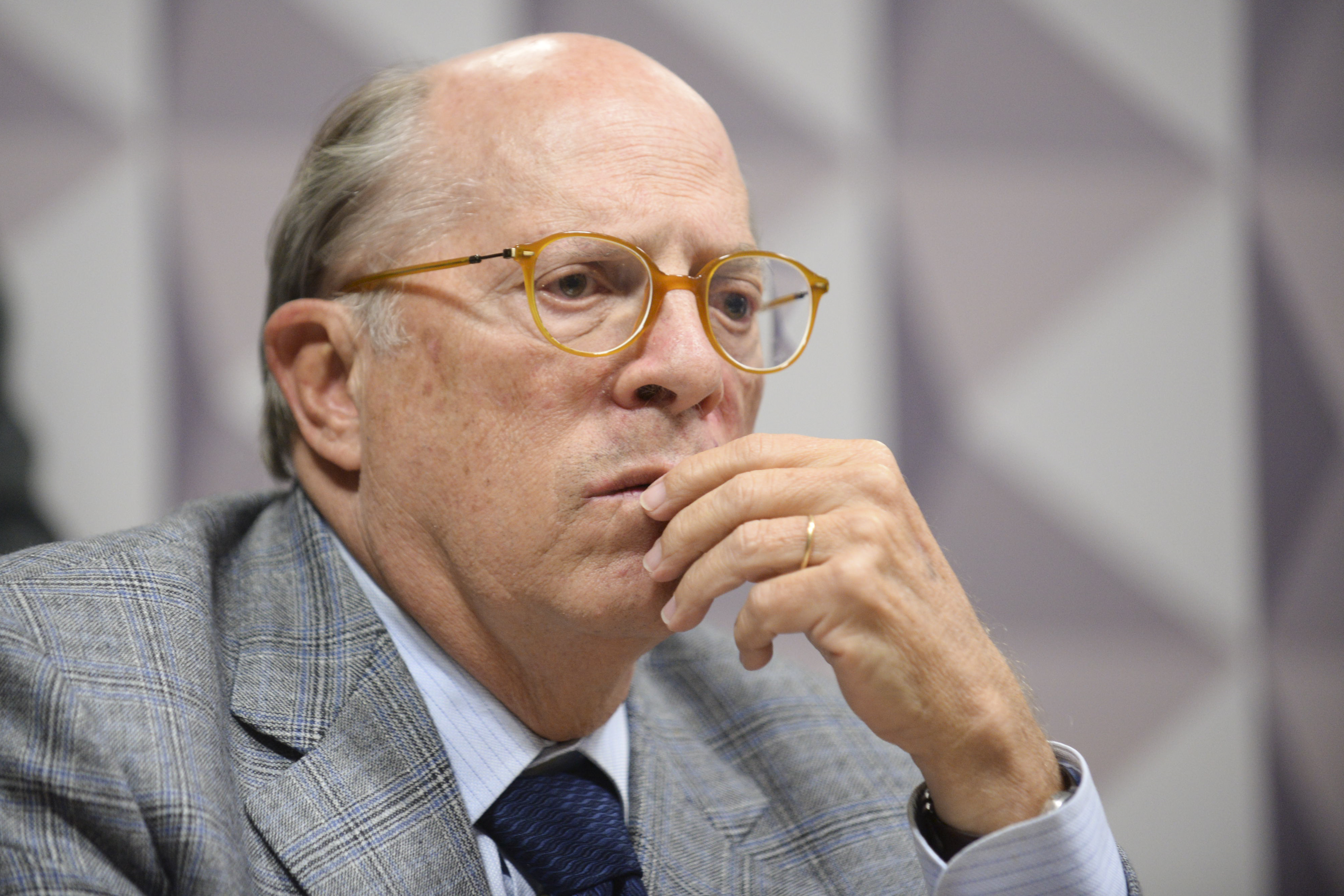

Minister of Justice
- In office 3 April 2002 – 10 July 2002
- President: Fernando Henrique Cardoso
- Preceded by: Aloysio Nunes
- Succeeded by: Paulo de Tarso Ramos Ribeiro

Secretary of Public Security of São Paulo
- In office 10 September 1983 – 31 January 1984
- Governor: Franco Montoro
- Preceded by: Manoel Pedro Pimentel
- Succeeded by: Michel Temer

Personal details
- Born: 18 April 1944 (age 82) São Paulo, Brazil
- Party: PSDB (1990–2017)
- Parent: Miguel Reale (father)
- Education: Law School, University of São Paulo (LL.B.)

Miguel Reale Júnior (born 18 April 1944) is a Brazilian jurist, politician, professor and lawyer. He was professor of Criminal Law at University of São Paulo (USP) and Minister of Justice in the government of Fernando Henrique Cardoso. Reale is son of the also jurist Miguel Reale and gained notoriety in 2015 when he proposed, along with jurists Hélio Bicudo and Janaína Paschoal, an impeachment request against president Dilma Rousseff.

== Career ==
Miguel Reale Júnior graduate in law in 1968 at the Law School of the University of São Paulo, where he also graduated with a Doctor's degree in 1971 with the thesis "Dos estados de necessidade" (English: "Of the states of necessity").

He was professor of the USP Law School from 1971 until his retirement in 2014, after becoming professor of Criminal Law in 1988. Reale is author of many articles published in many daily newspapers. He was member of the Reviewer Committee of the General Part of the Criminal Code and of the Criminal Execution Law between 1980 and 1984.

Miguel is also honorary member of the 2nd Chair of the Literature Academy of São Paulo, as of the Madrid Real Academia de Jurisprudencia y Legislación.

He was federal councillor of the Order of Attorneys of Brazil from 1974 to 1977. Was nominated as State Secretary of Public Security of São Paulo, from 1983 to 1984, in the government of André Franco Montoro. In 1987, Reale became president of the Narcotics Federal Council (COFEN), which was linked to the Ministry of Justice, being in office until 1988. In 1995, was State Secretary of Administration and Modernization of Public Service in Mário Covas administration.

In 2002, Miguel was nominated Minister of Justice by president Fernando Henrique Cardoso for a short time. Member of the Brazilian Social Democracy Party, Reale was also connected to politicians such as Franco Montoro, Mário Covas and Fernando Henrique Cardoso.

Member of the PSDB since 1990, he left the party in 2017, after it reaffirmned its support to Michel Temer's government, besides the scandals involving Temer and his allies.

== Impeachment process ==
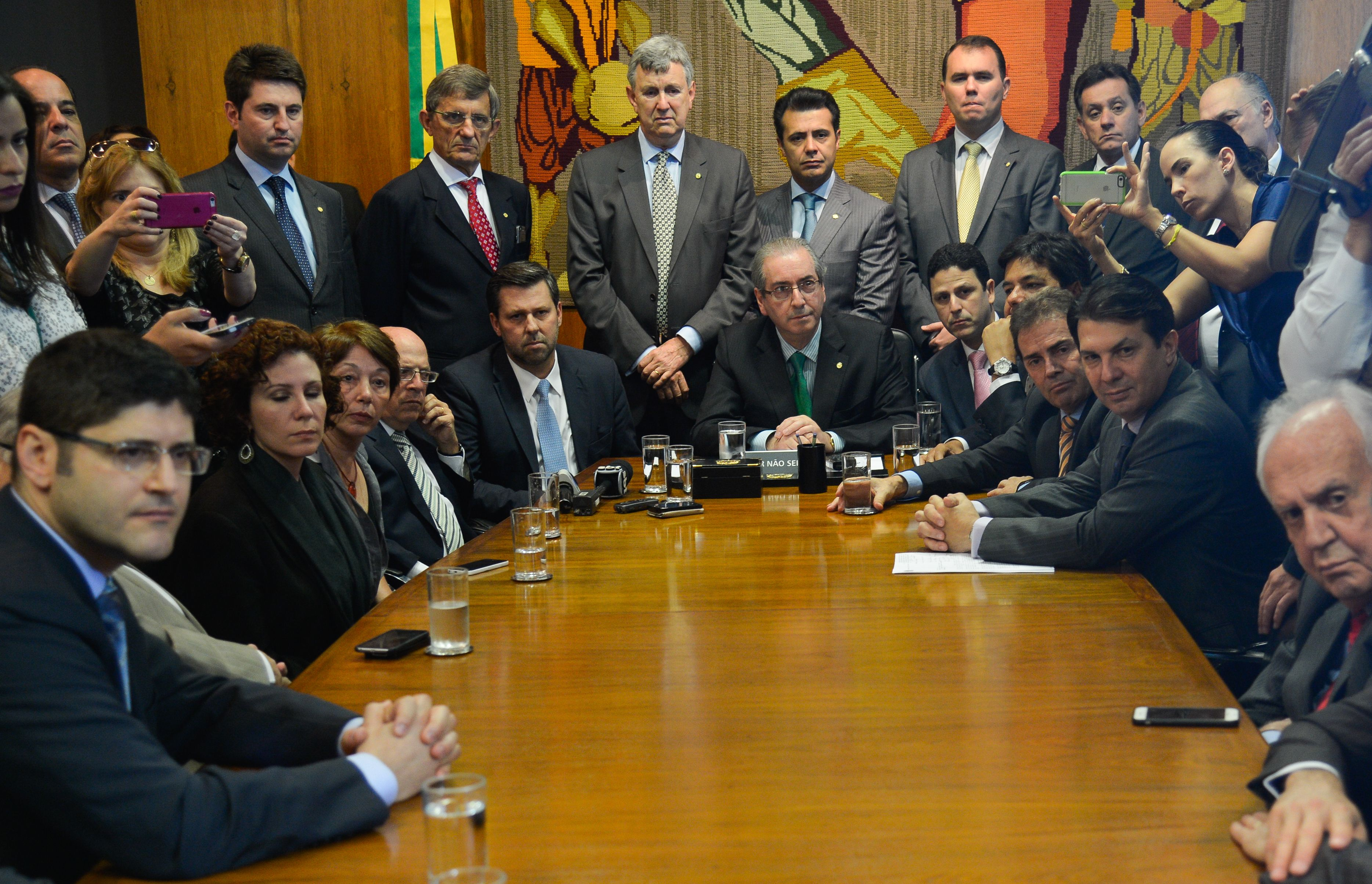
Jurist Miguel Reale Jr. and the daughter of Hélio Bicudo, Maria Bicudo, deliver the impeachment request against Dilma Rousseff to the then President of the Chamber of Deputies Eduardo Cunha.

In 2015, along with the jurists Hélio Bicudo and Janaína Paschoal, Reale filed an impeachment request against president Dilma Rousseff. The social movement pro-impeachment decided to join the request, which had the support of congressmen and part of the civil society, who filed a petition supporting the impeachment against the president. The request was voted on 17 April 2016 in an extraordinary session in the floor of the Chamber of Deputies, being approved with 367 votes of support, 137 against, 7 abstentions and 2 absences. On 31 August 2016, after three days of trial, the request was approved with 61 votes of support and 20 against, removing Rousseff from office.

== Books ==
- Reale Júnior, Miguel (2002). Instituições de Direito Penal: Parte Geral - Vol. 1 (in Portuguese). São Paulo: Forense. ISBN 9788530916800.
- Reale Júnior, Miguel (2003). InstituiçÕes de Direito Penal: Parte Geral - Vol. 2 (in Portuguese). São Paulo: Forense. ISBN 9788530919214.
- Reale Júnior, Miguel (1998). Teoria do Delito (in Portuguese). São Paulo: RT. ISBN 9788520318188.
- Reale Júnior, Miguel (1997). Problemas Penais Concretos (in Portuguese). São Paulo: Malheiros. ISBN 9788574204376.
- Reale, Miguel; Reale Júnior, Miguel (2000). Questões Atuais de Direito (in Portuguese). São Paulo: Del Rey. ISBN 9788573083231.

== See also ==
- Miguel Reale
- Hélio Bicudo
- Janaína Paschoal
- Impeachment of Dilma Rousseff

Honorary titles
Preceded by Miguel Reale	4th Academic of the 2nd Chair of the São Paulo Academy of Letters; 26 October 2006–present	Incumbent
Political offices
Preceded by Manoel Pedro Pimentel	State Secretary of Public Security of São Paulo; 1983–1984	Succeeded by Michel Temer
Preceded by Aloysio Nunes	Minister of Justice; 2002	Succeeded by Paulo de Tarso Ramos Ribeiro
