= Janaina Paschoal =

Brazilian jurist and politician (born 1974)

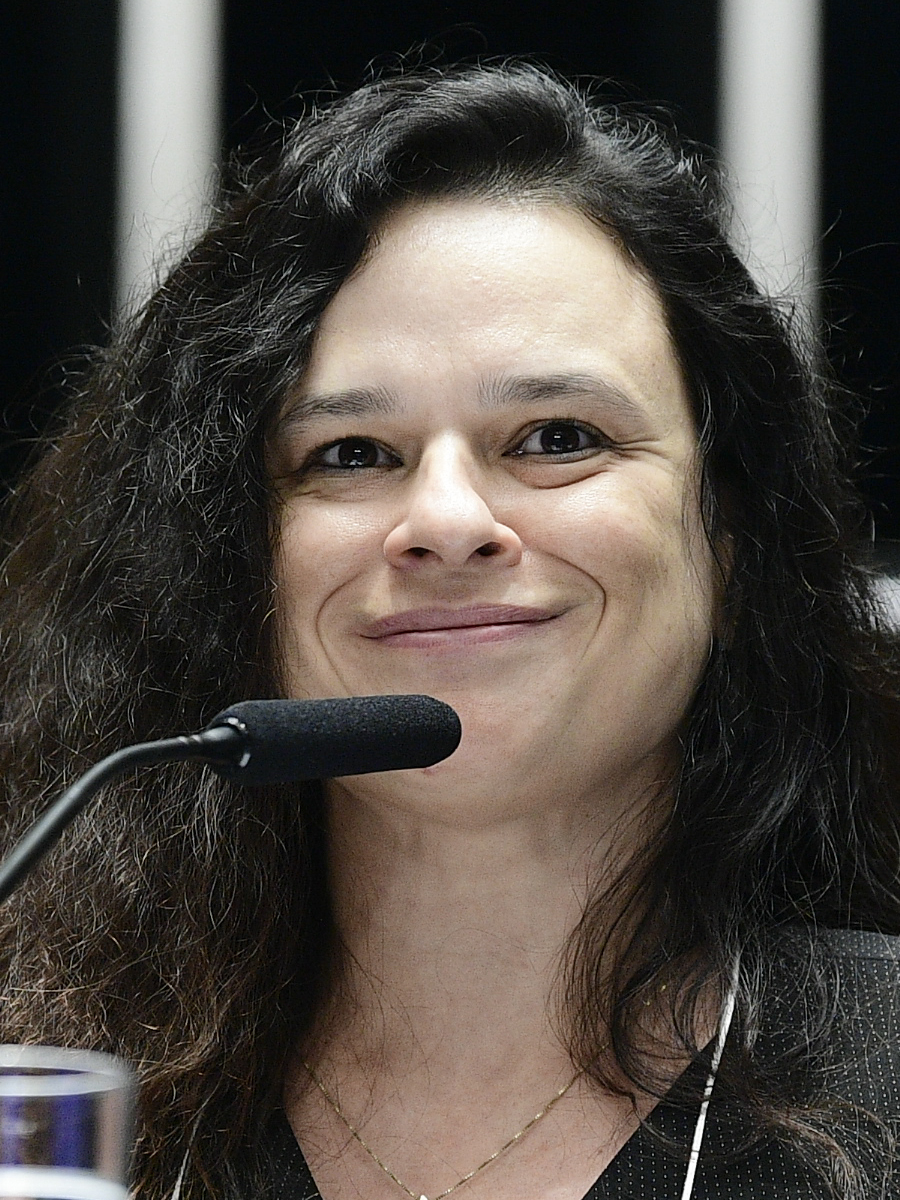
- Paschoal in 2022

Member of the Municipal Chamber of São Paulo
- Incumbent
- Assumed office 1 January 2025
- Constituency: At-large

Member of the Legislative Assembly of São Paulo
- In office 15 March 2019 – 15 March 2023
- Constituency: At-large

Personal details
- Born: Janaina Conceição Paschoal; 25 June 1974 (age 52) São Paulo, São Paulo, Brazil
- Party: PP (2024–present)
- Other political affiliations: PSL (2019–2022); UNIÃO (2022); PRTB (2022–2024)
- Education: University of São Paulo
- Occupation: Lawyer and law professor
- Known for: Impeachment of Dilma Rousseff
- Brazil, the United States: 2005 Diploma of Merit for Valorization of Life, SENAD – National Anti-Drug Secretariat; 2006 homage of the Secretariat of Justice and Citizenship, State Council of Narcotics

Janaina Conceição Paschoal (Portuguese pronunciation: [ʒɐnaˈinɐ kõsejˈsɐ̃w pa(j)s'kwaw], born 25 June 1974) is a Brazilian jurist and politician. She is a member of the Progressistas (PP) since 2024, having been elected state representative of the State of São Paulo by the Social Liberal Party (PSL) from 2019 to 2023. She is also a lawyer and a law professor at the University of São Paulo.

She obtained her doctorate in criminal law from the University of São Paulo in 2002, advised by Miguel Reale Júnior. Her thesis was entitled Constitution, Criminalization and Minimum Criminal Law. Paschoal played a major role in the impeachment of then Brazilian president Dilma Rousseff, alongside Miguel Reale Júnior, and Hélio Bicudo. She actively participated in the proceedings both in the Chamber of Deputies and the Brazilian Senate.

In the Brazilian general elections of 2018, Paschoal was elected state representative, receiving over 2 million votes, the most votes of any congressperson in the history of Brazil. In the 2022 São Paulo gubernatorial election, she decided to run for the Senate seat held by José Serra, being defeated after only achieving 447,550 votes and coming in fourth place, with 2.07% of the valid votes.

== Biography ==
Paschoal was born on 25 June 1974, in the Tatuapé neighborhood of São Paulo, daughter of Ricardo José de Gusmão Paschoal and Regina Célia Carvalho Paschoal. She has two younger sisters, Luana and Nohara, and a younger brother, Jorge, and has been married since the age of 26 to Laércio, an economist.

Paschoal began to work at the age of 13, selling jewelry, and bread and honey prepared by her mother.

She joined the Faculty of Law of the University of São Paulo in 1992, where she became director of the Academic Center XI de Agosto in Voice and Time management, graduating in 1996. During graduation, she also taught English at Fisk.

She was a trainee and, after graduation, a lawyer at the office of Ricardo Podval (who would, along with Jorge Paschoal, defend José Dirceu in Lava Jato), between 1995 and 2000, an adviser to the Secretariat of Public Security of the government Geraldo Alckmin in São Paulo from 2001 to 2002, the year in which she finished her doctorate and resigned to accompany its adviser, the then minister of justice Miguel Reale Júnior, like adviser.

In 2003, Paschoal became a professor at the University of São Paulo, where she teaches criminal law. In the same year, she and her sisters founded their own law firm, Paschoal Advogados, located in the region of Avenida Paulista and specializing in tax, financial and environmental law.

In 2015, Paschoal co-authored the petition for impeachment of President Dilma Rousseff, received the same year by Eduardo Cunha, and the following year, accepted by the Chamber of Deputies and judged by the Federal Senate, which forced the president out of office.

In 2016, in a case which attracted press attention, Paschoal defended then-procurator of the republic Douglas Kirchner, in an administrative proceeding after he was accused of physical and psychological aggression against his wife, Tamires de Souza Alexander. Paschoal claimed religious freedom for the aggressor, saying Kirchner had committed the acts under the influence of the pastor of the church to which he belonged, and was being tried for having believed. The National Council of the Public Prosecution, however, decided to fire the prosecutor.

== The impeachment of Dilma Rousseff ==
=== Protocol ===
On 1 September 2015, Paschoal filed a petition with the lawyers Hélio Bicudo and Miguel Reale Júnior in the Chamber of Deputies that initiated the process of impeaching Dilma Rousseff.

According to lawyers, Dilma committed crimes of responsibility under the Constitution and Fiscal Responsibility Law (LRF), including the following:

- Acts against probity in administration;
- Acts against the budget law;
- Acts against compliance with laws and judicial decisions;
- Crime against custody and legal employment of public money.

=== Answers ===
On 30 March 2016, in a statement to the special chamber committee analyzing the impeachment petition, Janaina Paschoal alleged that through BNDES the government sent money to countries such as Angola, Cuba, and others, which the bank contested in an official statement, saying it did not send funds abroad, nor did it carry out any confidential operations, countering the lawyer's charge that shipments would have been made in secrecy.

== Political career ==
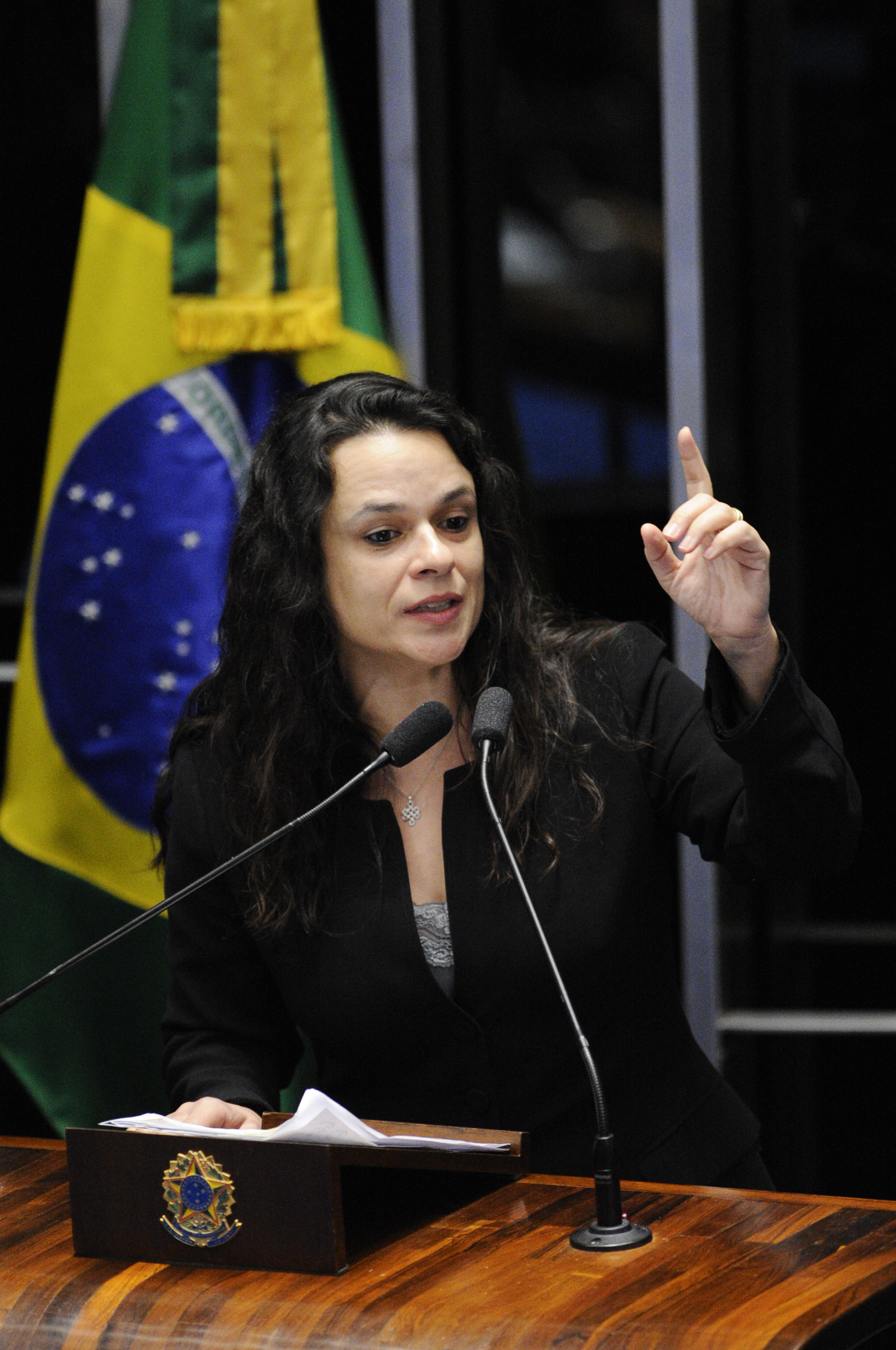
Paschoal in 2016

After working on the impeachment of Dilma Rousseff, reflecting on her future in politics and invitations from diverse parties, Paschoal joined the Liberal Social Party (PSL), the current party of Jair Bolsonaro.

"On the last day of the deadline, I joined the [PSL] party. Many people already linked to the acronym have recommended me, except for one point or another, the party's status confers on what I think. There are reports of corruption scandals involving the acronym, or its members, and I did not join in thinking about being a candidate for position A or B. I joined in order to have the possibility, a possible candidacy would not be possible," she said.

Initially, the leadership of the PSL in São Paulo invited her to join the governor's race for the party, but she rejected them. Other positions were also suggested to her, including the vice presidency, whose points were being clarified in talks with Bolsonaro. However, on 4 August 2018, she gave up for family reasons, since the family could not accompany her to Brasilia.

On 14 August 2018, she announced that she would be a candidate for a state deputy of São Paulo, having the electoral number 17317, with an education and public safety platform. She was elected with 2,060,786 votes, 9.88% of the valid votes, being the state deputy with the most votes in the state of São Paulo and the most in Brazil.

=== Positions ===
In June 2016, Paschoal said that "politicians will think more before committing crimes", in reference to Operation Lava Jato, and the 10 Anti-Corruption Measures on the grounds that it will give the Public Prosecutor greater power over other institutions. She also criticized the abuse of authority bill, also being discussed in Congress. In her words, the legislation was proposed with the aim of "embarrassing those who work in repression against corruption". The lawyer also opposed the bill restricting the Federal Supreme Court's (STF) judgments being broadcast live on TV Justice, stating that this is to silence them.

In November 2016, she voiced her opposition to the amnesty to Box 2. On 24 November 2016, she said that approving the amnesty is a breach of decorum. "The amnesty clause is an indication of what people have been looking for in the streets," Paschoal posted on Twitter. According to her, "to approve the amnesty is breach of propriety" of the parliamentarians and, even if the proposal were overturned by the STF in future, the deputies that benefited from the amnesty would not be punished. "If the accused had their punishment extinguished on the basis of the amnesty, any subsequent decision of the STF would not be retroactive", she added.

In May 2017, following the political upheaval surrounding JBS, she said that the audio of President Michel Temer had to be analyzed in conjunction with the purchase of dollars by JBS on the day before the scandal, which must also be investigated. Paschoal also said that Temer should resign.

== Electoral history ==
Election	Office	Party	Votes	%	
Election	Office	Party	Votes	%	Result
2018 São Paulo State Election	State deputy	Social Liberal Party	2,060,786	9,88%	Elected
2022 São Paulo Senate Election	Senator	Brazilian Labour Renewal Party	447,550	2,07%	Lost
2024 São Paulo municipal election	City council	Progressives	48,893	0.84%	Elected

== Publications ==
=== Books ===
- Criminal law: general part . Barueri: Manole, 2003.
- Constitution, criminalization and minimum criminal law . São Paulo: Journal of the Courts, 2003.
- Women and Criminal Law (organizer, together with Miguel Reale Júnior). Rio de Janeiro: Forensics, 2007.
- Undue interference: commissive crimes by omission and control by punishment of not doing. Porto Alegre: Sérgio Antonio Fabris, 2011.
- Tribute to Miguel Reale Júnior (organizer, with Renato Melo Jorge Silveira). Rio de Janeiro: GZ, 2014.

=== Articles ===
- "Internment as a last resort" – 17 July 2010
- "Accept Battisti is not a legal choice" – 13 September 2010
- "In defense of the Mayara student" – 11/12/10
- "Reflection on the legalization of abortion" – 04/03/11
- "There is no free public space in the world for consumption and sale of drugs" – 20 January 2012
- "Cuba is a great Guantánamo" – 14 February 2012
- "Is the Amnesty Law valid for crimes whose victims are still missing?" – 24 March 2012
- "Politically correct criminal law" – 6 October 2012
- "Trends / Debates – The law, for friends and foes" – 10 August 2012
- "Criminal Law Reform: who wins?" – 31 August 2012
- "Trends / Debates: It can not be crime to save a life" – 12 December 2012
- "The eternal illusion of control" – 6 February 2013
- "There are 12 Brazilians kidnapped!" – 23 March 2013
- "Political Surrealism" – 30 May 2013
- "A fact: several looks" – 21 July 2013
- "The STF was correct in determining the immediate arrest of the accused?" – 16 November 2013
- "First considerations on the latest version of the Draft Criminal Code, presented on 10/12/13" – 14 December 2013
- "Corruption Kills!" – 26 December 2013
- "The law that can increase corruption" – 4 February 2014
- "Analysis: 'Brazil needs to stop hiding behind alleged absence of legislation'"- 13 February 2014
- "Will it be a market reserve?" – 25 April 2014
- "The impacts of anti-corruption law" – 6 January 2014
- "The disease of this election" – 25 September 2014
- "When the rule is not clear" – 28 February 2015
- "Criminal Provisional Measure" – 26 August 2015
- "Dark law is the worst of standards" – 21 September 2015
- "We will not give up on Brazil" – 10 July 2015
- "Republic schizophrenic?" – 10 September 2015
- "From addiction to virtue" – 13 October 2015
- "The case law of the mensalão creates dangerous precedents in procedural security and the rights of the accused?" – 10/27/15
- "We only want to rescue morality and legality in Brazil" – 15 November 2015
- "Supreme Shield" – 23 December 2015
- "The Supreme has decided that the Senate is sovereign" – 18 April 2016
- "Our complaint can not be broken" – 23 April 2016
- "Short Notes Concerning the Institute of Plea Bargaining in American Law" – 17 November 2016
- "Drug and Crime: Some of the various interfaces" – 19 January 2017
- "Impeachment was the beginning of the cleaning process necessary for Brazil" – 17 April 2017
- "The meaning of absolution in the TSE" – 17 June 2017

== Political views ==
Decriminalization of Abortion	No
Reduction of Criminal Majority	No
Race quotas	Yes
Amnesty to Caixa Dois	No
Ten measures against corruption	Yes
Free press	Yes
Democracy	Yes
Support to Operation Car Wash	Yes

== See also ==
- Anti-corruption
- Corruption in Brazil
- Onyx Lorenzoni, Brazilian politician
- Women's rights in Brazil
- Operation Car Wash
