= Hélio Bicudo =

Brazilian jurist and politician

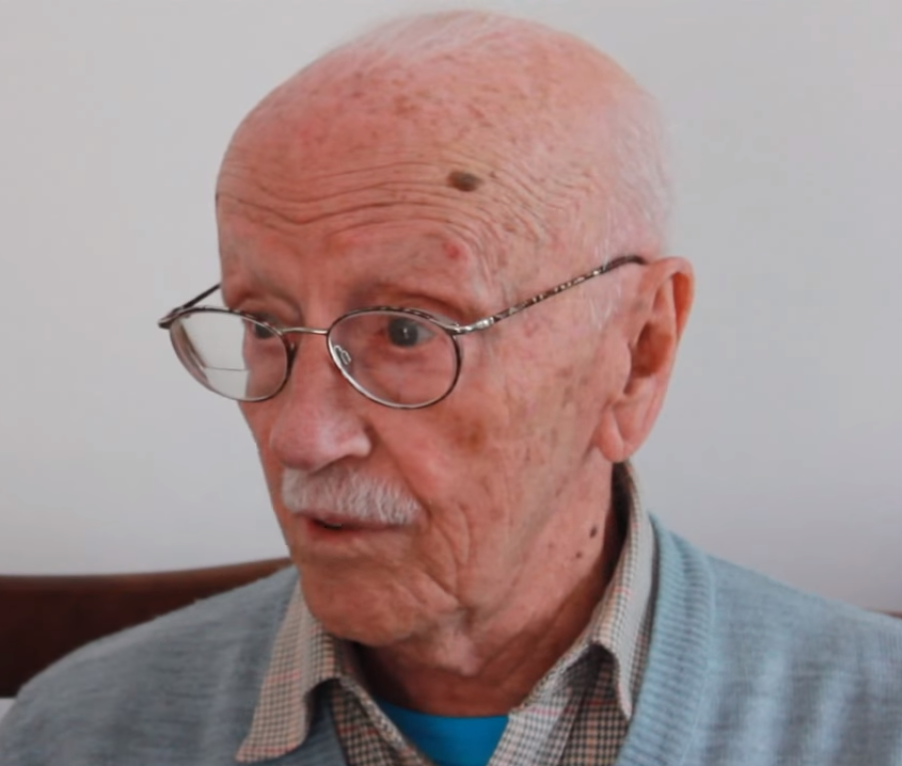

Deputy Mayor of São Paulo
- In office 1 January 2001 – 1 January 2005
- Mayor: Marta Suplicy
- Preceded by: Régis de Oliveira
- Succeeded by: Gilberto Kassab

Member of the Chamber of Deputies
- In office 1 February 1991 – 1 February 1999
- Constituency: São Paulo

Secretary of Legal Affairs of São Paulo
- In office 1 January 1989 – 31 December 1990
- Mayor: Luiza Erundina
- Preceded by: Cláudio Lembo
- Succeeded by: Dalmo Dallari

Personal details
- Born: Hélio Pereira Bicudo; 5 July 1922 São Paulo, Brazil
- Died: 31 July 2018 (aged 96) São Paulo, Brazil
- Party: PT (1980–2005)
- Education: University of São Paulo (LL.B.)
- Profession: Attorney

Hélio Pereira Bicudo (5 July 1922 – 31 July 2018) was a Brazilian jurist and politician.

== Biography ==
During the term of Carvalho Pinto as Governor of São Paulo, Bicudo was the first president of the Urubupungá Electric Centrals, builders of the Jupiá and Ilha Solteira power plants.

He was acting Minister of Finance, replacing Carvalho Pinto between 27 September and 4 October 1963.

As Justice Prosecutor of São Paulo, fought against the death squad, alongside the then Justice District Attorney Dirceu de Mello. Because of his participation in this case and other investigation of violation of human rights, he had his name included in the National Intelligence Service.

In 1981, became part of the 1st executive board of Directors of Wilson Pinheiro Foundation, foundation of partisan support instituted by the PT, predecessor of the Perseu Abramo Foundation.

In 1986, Bicudo was the Workers' Party candidate to the Senate, placing 3rd, after the elected Mário Covas and Fernando Henrique Cardoso, both from the Brazilian Democratic Movement Party.

He was Secretary of Legal Affairs of São Paulo during the administration of Luiza Erundina from 1989 to 1990, years which he was elected federal deputy.

In February 2000, he was sworn-in president of the Inter-American Commission on Human Rights, based in Washington. He was the third Brazilian to assume the presidency of the entity.

Hélio was Deputy Mayor of São Paulo from 2001 to 2005, during the administration of Marta Suplicy.

One of the approximately 100 professor that founded the then called Workers' Party in Education and then the Workers' Party in 1980, which he was member until 2005, following the Mensalão scandal.

In 2010, declared support to Marina Silva in the first round and to José Serra in the second round. In 2012, supported Serra one more time for Mayor of São Paulo.

Created and presided, between 2003 and 2013, the Inter-American Foundation of Defence of the Human Rights (FidDH), entity that acted alongside the Inter-American Commission on Human Rights, denouncing and following cases of disrespect of human rights in Brazil.

The complaints under his responsibility were transferred to the care of many other entities of the same objective. The closure of activities of the FidDH happened because of the lack of financial resources. Its library collection was donated to the Pontifical Catholic University of São Paulo in the same year in a solemn act.

In 2015, he filed in the Chamber of Deputies an impeachment request against president Dilma Rousseff. Jurist Miguel Reale Júnior and pro-impeachment social movements decided to support Bicudo's request, which got the support of parliamentaries in the Congress and the majority of the civil society, whom organized a petition requesting the impeachment of the President of the Republic, while other parliamentaries and member of the Workers' Party positioned themselves in the defence of the defendant President. Bicudo's request was, in the same year, accepted by the then President of the Chamber of Deputies Eduardo Cunha, after many meetings to instruct the claimants. On 31 August 2016, the impeachment request was approved by the Federal Senate in a voting 61–20, removing Rousseff from the Presidency and officializing Michel Temer as President of Brazil.

Bicudo died on 31 July 2018 in São Paulo from a stroke at age of 96.

Political offices
Preceded by Régis de Oliveira	Deputy Mayor of São Paulo; 2001–04	Succeeded by Gilberto Kassab
