= Fiscal pedaling =

Creative accounting technique

Fiscal pedaling (a calque from Brazilian Portuguese: pedalada fiscal, or simply pedaladas) is a governmental creative accounting technique involving the use of state-owned banks to front funds required for paying general government obligations without officially declaring a loan, thus hiding these transfers from public scrutiny and delaying repayment from the Treasury to these banks. As such it is a kind of "overdraft" implying a positive balance sheet that does not really exist. Sometimes the term fiscal backpedaling is used.

The term gained popularity with the Brazilian Presidential election of 2014, in which President Dilma Rousseff was reelected. She was later accused of fiscal pedaling during the campaign, for allowing this delay in repayment to government-owned banks by the Brazilian Treasury which is also the entity which oversees these banks. Her opponents argued that this amounted to undeclared loans by these banks to the Treasury, which is prohibited by the Brazilian Constitution and a violation of the Fiscal Responsibility Law. The Rousseff Administration allegedly used this pedaling to improve fiscal outcomes and make the budget surplus for the years 2012 to 2014 appear larger. The Tribunal de Contas da União (TCU), unanimously declared this maneuver a violation of fiscal responsibility. The decision of the TCU put the National Congress under great pressure to begin impeachment proceedings of Dilma Rousseff.

One possible motivation for fiscal pedaling is political advantage, in that it permits a government to conceal the true extent of its fiscal obligations during a political campaign. President Rousseff's government was accused of using these accounting techniques during the bitterly fought campaign of 2014, with the funding thus obtained allegedly used to support programs for the poor, credits to farmers, and subsidies for low-income housing. Supporters claimed this was standard practice in Brazil and had been engaged in by previous Presidents, and that the opposition to her was purely political.

== See also ==
- 2015–16 protests in Brazil
