= Jupiá =

Coordinates: 26°27′S 52°40′W

- Municipality
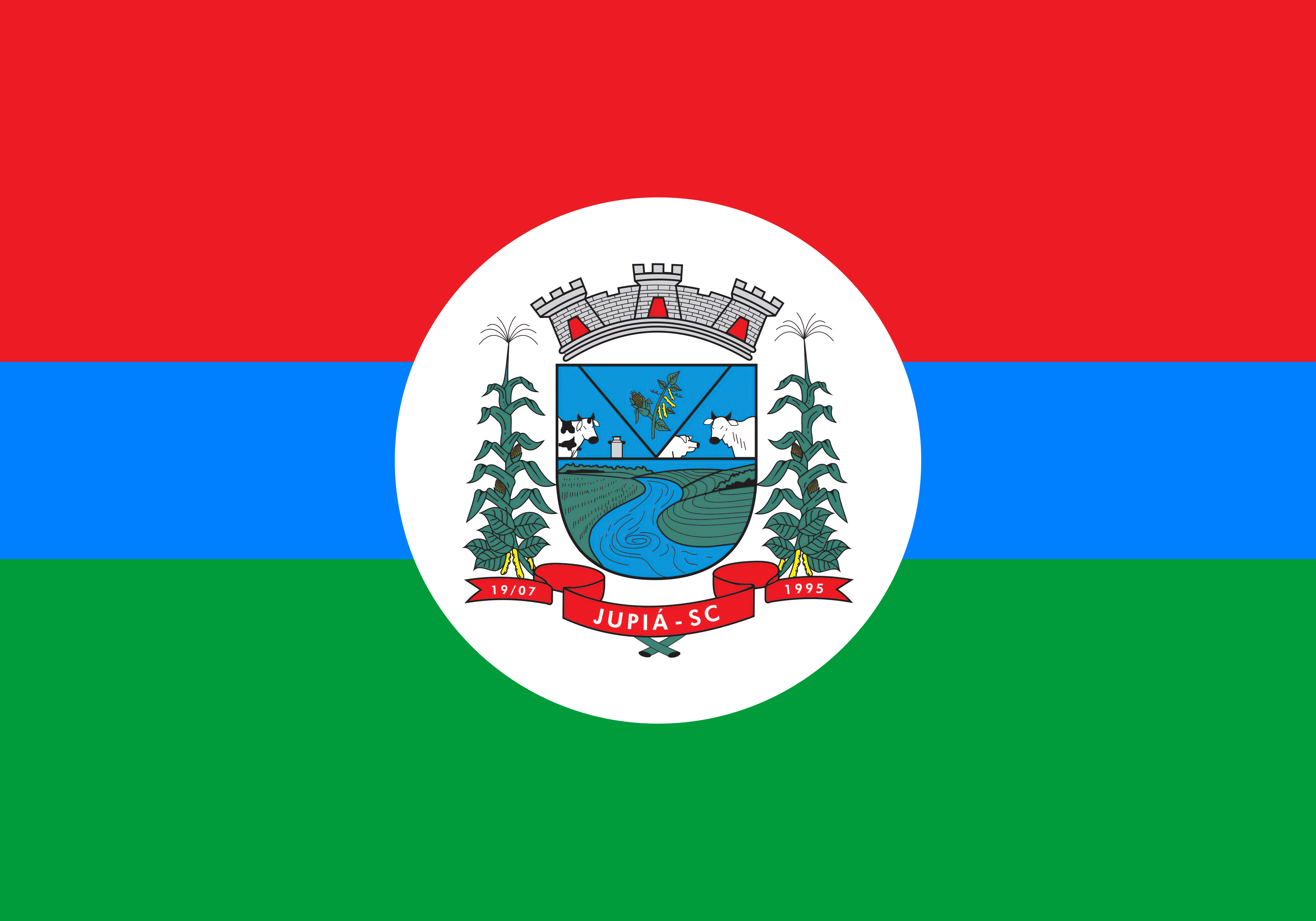
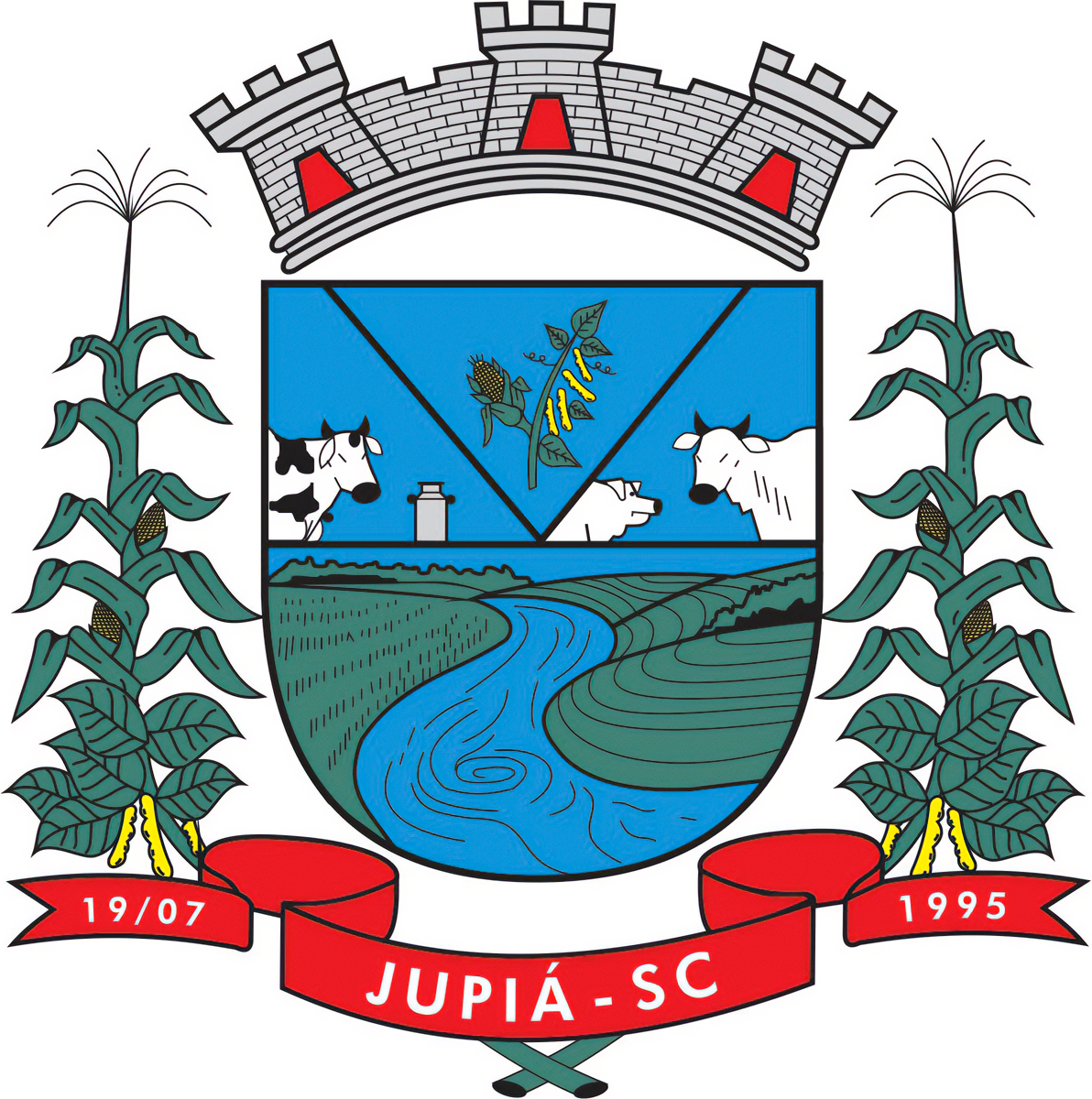
- Flag Coat of arms

- Country: Brazil
- Region: South
- State: Santa Catarina
- Mesoregion: Oeste Catarinense

Population (2020)
  - Total: 2,092
- Time zone: UTC -3
- Website: www.jupia.sc.gov.br

Jupiá is a municipality in the state of Santa Catarina in the South region of Brazil.

== See also ==
- List of municipalities in Santa Catarina
