= Raimundo Lira =

Brazilian politician

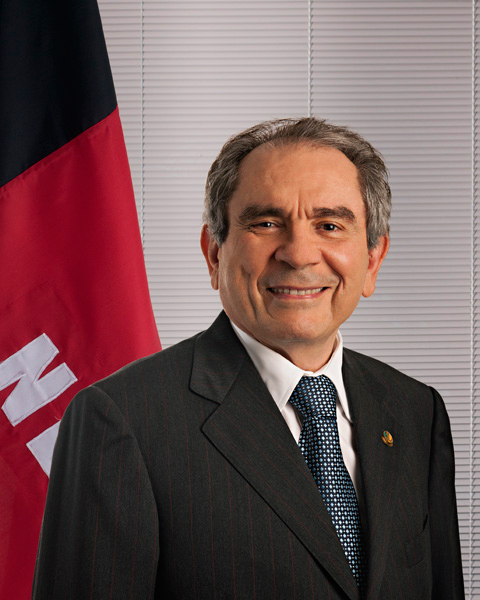

Senator from Paraíba
- Incumbent
- Assumed office December 22, 2014

Senator from Paraíba
- In office February 1, 1987 – January 30, 1995

Personal details
- Born: December 16, 1943 (age 82) Cajazeiras, Paraíba
- Party: Brazilian Democratic Movement Party
- Profession: Economist

Raimundo Lira (born December 16, 1943) is a Brazilian politician. He has represented Paraíba in the Federal Senate since 2014. Previously, he was a Paraíba senator from 1987 to 1995. He is a member of the Brazilian Democratic Movement Party.
