= 2026 Rio de Janeiro succession crisis =

2026 Rio de Janeiro gubernatorial special election
- Gubernatorial election (if indirect)
- TBD

70 members of the Legislative Assembly 36 electoral votes needed to win
Incumbent Governor
Ricardo Couto (acting)
independent
- Gubernatorial election (if direct)
- TBD
Incumbent Governor
Ricardo Couto (acting)
independent

The 2026 Rio de Janeiro succession crisis started due to the definitive vacancy of the offices of Governor and Vice-Governor of Rio de Janeiro, after the resignation of governor Cláudio Castro on 23 March 2026.

The Supreme Federal Court (STF) began deciding on 8 April whether the election will be indirect, in which only members of the Legislative Assembly of Rio de Janeiro (Alerj) vote, or direct, with all voters in the state participating. Following the Superior Electoral Court's (TSE) ruling clarifying the legal status of Cláudio Castro's resignation, the trial was scheduled to resume on 19 August 2026, but it has been postponed indefinitely.

On 4 October 2026, the regular gubernatorial election took place, with Douglas Ruas elected in the first round. It remains unclear whether the STF will rule that a special election should be held before Ruas takes office in January 2027.

== Background ==
The succession crisis in Rio de Janeiro reached a climax with the resignation of Cláudio Castro in March 2026. With the absence of a Vice-Governor in office (as it was already vacant), the state faced a "double vacancy", as the president of the Legislative Assembly (second in the line of succession) had been suspended since December 2025 by a ruling of the Supreme Federal Court. According to the line of succession, the President of the Court of Justice of Rio de Janeiro (TJ-RJ), Justice Ricardo Couto de Castro, took office as Acting Governor until the indirect election and the inauguration of a new Governor.

=== Resignation of Thiago Pampolha ===
The succession crisis in Rio de Janeiro began with the resignation of Thiago Pampolha (MDB), who had been elected Vice-Governor in 2022 on Cláudio Castro's ticket, in order to assume a position as a Justice (Conselheiro) of the State Court of Accounts (TCE-RJ). The vacancy arose following the retirement of José Maurício de Lima Nolasco, who had held the position since 1998 after being appointed by then-Governor Marcello Alencar.

Pampolha's appointment resulted from a political agreement between Castro and the then-President of the Legislative Assembly of Rio de Janeiro, Rodrigo Bacellar (UNIÃO). At the time, Bacellar was positioning himself as a potential candidate for governor and, as first in the line of succession in the absence of a Vice-Governor, stood to benefit politically from increased visibility. Pampolha resigned from office on 21 May 2025, the same day he was sworn in to the Court of Accounts.

=== Arrest of Rodrigo Bacellar ===
On 3 December 2025, Rodrigo Bacellar was placed in pre-trial detention by the Federal Police as part of Operation Unha e Carne, by order of Supreme Federal Court Justice Alexandre de Moraes. He was suspected of leaking confidential information from Operation Zargun, launched earlier that year, which led to the arrest of State Deputy TH Joias (MDB), allegedly linked to Comando Vermelho. Bacellar reportedly warned the Deputy in advance and advised him to destroy evidence.

Six days later, he was granted provisional release after the Legislative Assembly voted to revoke the detention, although he remained suspended from the Presidency and was required to wear an electronic ankle monitor. The Supreme Federal Court maintained precautionary measures, including a curfew, a ban on contacting other individuals under criminal investigation, and the surrender of his passports.

Due to his removal, the Acting President of the Assembly, Guilherme Delaroli (PL), could not assume the Governorship, as he held the position on an interim basis. As a result, the next in the line of succession became the President of the Court of Justice of Rio de Janeiro, Justice Ricardo Couto de Castro.

=== Resignation of Cláudio Castro ===
On 23 March 2026, Governor Cláudio Castro resigned from office, stating that he would run for the Federal Senate in the October election amid an ongoing case before the Superior Electoral Court (TSE) that could have led to his removal from office. The following day, on 24 March 2026, the TSE convicted Castro and Thiago Pampolha by a 5–2 vote, imposing an eight-year ban from holding public office on both. The Court also annulled Rodrigo Bacellar’s mandate as a state deputy on the same charges. Control of Guanabara Palace then passed to Ricardo Couto de Castro, then-President of the Court of Justice of Rio de Janeiro. He is required by law to call an indirect election to be held by the Legislative Assembly within 48 hours.

=== Alerj leadership crisis ===
On 26 March 2026, following the annulment of Rodrigo Bacellar’s mandate, the Legislative Assembly convened an extraordinary session to elect a new president. State deputy Douglas Ruas (PL), an ally of former governor Cláudio Castro and a candidate in the October gubernatorial election, was elected president of the Assembly by 45 votes to 0, as the opposition boycotted the vote. As a result, he was also tasked with assuming full control of the state government as governor, replacing Ricardo Couto, until the indirect election is held.

Later that same day, the Court of Justice of Rio de Janeiro annulled the session and ruled that the Legislative Assembly may only elect a new president after the state’s Regional Electoral Court (TRE-RJ) recalculates the distribution of seats to which each party is entitled, in light of the annulment of Bacellar’s votes. The recalculation was completed on 31 March, granting the Liberal Party one additional seat in the Assembly. Other parties could still challenge the procedure, and final ratification took place on 14 April.

On 17 April, Douglas Ruas was elected again as president of the Legislative Assembly by 44 votes to 0, with the opposition once again boycotting the vote. Ruas will not fully assume the government of Rio, as the Supreme Federal Court has determined that Ricardo Couto should remain in office at least until the Court decides whether the election will be direct or indirect.

On 24 April, Justice Cristiano Zanin rejected a request by Ruas for him to immediately assume the government of Rio de Janeiro and reiterated the decision that Ricardo Couto should remain as governor until the Supreme Court rules on the election. On 29 May, Justice Luiz Fux denied another request by Ruas to assume the state government.

== Electoral process ==
The election is ruled by procedures established by the Assembly, but the process was altered by legal rulings from the Supreme Federal Court before being held.

=== Supreme Federal Court decisions ===
Originally, Legislative Assembly rules established an open ballot, as well as short deadlines for resignation from executive public offices for candidates (24 hours). However, in an injunction ruled by Supreme Federal Court justice Luiz Fux, it was determined that the vote would be held by secret ballot and that the deadline for resignation for electoral eligibility would be 180 days, in accordance with federal legislation. On 25 March, Fux referred the case to the Court’s plenary and two divergences were opened. Justice Cármen Lúcia voted for the deadline for resignation for electoral eligibility to remain at 24 hours and was joined by four other justices. Meanwhile, Justice Alexandre de Moraes voted for the election to be direct, with all voters in Rio de Janeiro, rather than by the Legislative Assembly, and was joined by three other justices.

On 27 March, the Supreme Federal Court decided to maintain the indirect election (6 votes to 4); maintain the deadline for resignation for electoral eligibility at 24 hours after the double vacancy (9 votes to 1); and make the vote in the assembly by secret ballot (10 votes to 0). Four justices also voted to keep Ricardo Couto as acting governor until the election takes place, regardless of the election for the presidency of the Legislative Assembly, but this position did not form a majority.

On the evening of 27 March, Justice Cristiano Zanin granted a request filed by the Social Democratic Party (PSD) and suspended the holding of the indirect election until the Supreme Federal Court rules on the merits of the case. Zanin understood that the issue regarding the modality of the election had not yet been explicitly examined by all the justices. Three potential scenarios will be under discussion:

- An indirect election by the Legislative Assembly at the end of April;
- A direct election, in which all voters in the state participate, in June;
- A unification with the regular election in October, with the winner taking office early (in order to avoid two direct elections within such a short period).

The trial began on 8 April, with the votes of both rapporteurs, Justices Fux and Zanin, who voted in favor of indirect and direct elections, respectively. On 9 April, Justice Flávio Dino requested that the proceedings be suspended until the TSE publishes the ruling that rendered Cláudio Castro ineligible. Justices André Mendonça, Kassio Nunes Marques, and Cármen Lúcia have already indicated their votes in favor of an indirect election. The Court made it explicit that Ricardo Couto should remain as acting governor until a final decision is reached.

On 23 April, the TSE published the ruling of the judgment that rendered Cláudio Castro ineligible. The document states that Castro’s mandate was not revoked due to his resignation the day before the conviction. However, the ruling leaves open the question of what form the special election should take. On 5 May, the Electoral Public Prosecutor’s Office pointed to a contradiction in the ruling that rendered Claudio Castro ineligible, since, according to the Prosecutor’s Office, a majority of the justices voted in favor of annulling Castro’s electoral mandate, but this information was not included in the ruling published by the Court. In the appeal, Deputy Electoral Prosecutor-General Alexandre Espinosa requested that the ruling be corrected so that the annulment of the mandate would be expressly recorded. On 2 June, the TSE rejected, by a 5–2 vote, the Electoral Prosecutor’s appeal seeking the annulment of Castro’s mandate, since he had resigned one day before the conviction, maintaining only his ineligibility until 2030. The Court again did not address the merits of the format of the special election.

On 30 June, Justice Flávio Dino returned the case after his request for additional time to review it. The President of the Court, Justice Edson Fachin, scheduled the resumption of the trial for 19 August.

=== Rules decided ===
With the legislation approved by the Legislative Assembly and the provisional modifications made by the Supreme Federal Court, the rules of the indirect election are as follows:

- The ballot, which was originally supposed to be open, became secret.
- The deadline for candidates holding executive public offices to resign was maintained at 24 hours.
- Candidates' registration should occur up to 5 business days after the publishing of the application.
- The vote will be held in an extraordinary session of the Legislative Assembly.
- The ticket which garners an absolute majority (36 out of 70 votes) will be elected. If no candidates receives 36 votes, a second round will be held with the two most voted tickets.
- The winner must take office up to 48 hours after the results.

=== Calendar ===
In the event of an indirect election, it was expected to be held on 22 April 2026, a controversial date as it would fall between two national and local holidays: Tiradentes Day (21 April) and Saint George's Day (23 April). As the election did not take place by that date, a new date is yet to be determined. In the case of a direct election, the first round was expected to take place around 21 June, with the second round a few weeks later, right in the middle of the party conventions for the regular October elections.

== Candidacies ==
To run for office of Governor in an interim term (which ends on 5 January 2027), the candidates must follow the following requirements:

1. Be Brazilian;
2. Minimum age of 30;
3. Be registered in the State of Rio de Janeiro;
4. Be registered to a political party;
5. Register a complete ticket, with candidates for both Governor and Vice-Governor.
