= 2026 Rio de Janeiro general election =

- Gubernatorial election
- 4 October 2026
- Opinion polls
- Registered: 12,842,517
- Turnout: 76.67% (▼0.57 pp)

| Candidate | Douglas Ruas | Eduardo Paes |
| Party | PL | PSD |
| Alliance | Rio Real | Juntos para Mudar, Coragem para Reconstruir |
| Running mate | Fernanda Louback | Jane Reis (MDB) |
| Popular vote | 4,271,199 | 3,706,984 |
| Percentage | 50.88% | 44.16% |
Governor before election
Ricardo Couto (acting)
Independent
Elected Governor
Douglas Ruas
PL
- Senatorial election
- 4 October 2026
- Registered: 12,842,517
- Turnout: 76.67% (▼0.57 pp)

| Candidate | Carlos Portinho | Carlos Jordy | Benedita da Silva |
| Party | PL | PL | PT |
| Popular vote | 4,267,932 | 3,912,405 | 3,220,765 |
| Percentage | 26.77% | 24.56% | 20.22% |
Senators before election
Flávio Bolsonaro and Carlos Portinho
PL
Elected Senators
Carlos Jordy and Carlos Portinho
PL

The 2026 Rio de Janeiro general election were held on 4 October 2026 in the Brazilian state of Rio de Janeiro. Voters elected a Governor, a Vice-Governor, two Senators, 46 representatives for the Chamber of Deputies, and 70 Legislative Assembly members.

Following the Cláudio Castro electoral annulment case in March 2026, Rio de Janeiro entered a succession crisis. Castro resigned on the eve of the TSE ruling that made him ineligible, and with the vice-governorship already vacant and the Alerj president removed from office, the post fell to Ricardo Couto, president of the state Court of Justice, as interim Governor. Couto is not running for a full term. Flávio Bolsonaro (PL) and Carlos Portinho (PL) (who assumed the seat following the death of Arolde de Oliveira in 2020) are completing their eight-year terms as Senators. Flávio Bolsonaro is running for President. Carlos Portinho was for re-elected as Senator alongside federal deputy Carlos Jordy.

State deputy Douglas Ruas and former mayor Eduardo Paes initially advanced to a gubernatorial runoff, having received 49.27% and 42.76% of the vote, respectively. However, former governor Anthony Garotinho, whose candidacy had been rejected but remained sub judice and who received 3.17% of the vote, withdrew his appeal concerning his eligibility. On 8 October 2026, the Superior Electoral Court (TSE) ratified the withdrawal, invalidated Garotinho’s votes and ordered the results to be retabulated. As a result, Ruas was declared governor-elect in the first round with 50.88% of the valid votes.

== Background ==
=== Electoral calendar ===
Note: This section only presents the main dates of the 2026 electoral calendar, check the TSE official website (in Portuguese) and other official sources for detailed information.

Electoral calendar
| 15 May | Start of crowdfunding of candidates |
| 20 July to 5 August | Party conventions for choosing candidates and coalitions |
| 16 August to 1 October | Period of exhibition of free electoral propaganda on radio, television and on the internet related to the first round |
| 4 October | First round of 2026 elections |
| until 19 December | Delivery of electoral diplomas for those who were elected in the 2026 elections by the Brazilian Election Justice |

=== Governor ===
Incumbent Governor Cláudio Castro of the Liberal Party was elected in the first round of the 2022 election with 58.67% of the vote, defeating Marcelo Freixo of the Brazilian Socialist Party (PSB). Castro, who was originally elected as Vice-Governor in 2018 on the same ticket as Wilson Witzel, assumed the Governorship permanently in May 2021 following Witzel's impeachment and removal from office. Because he served the remainder of Witzel's term and was reelected for a full term in 2022, he is constitutionally barred from seeking a third consecutive period in executive office.

Castro's Vice-Governor after the 2022 election was Thiago Pampolha, who had also been the State Secretary of the Environment since 2021. In 2024, Thiago Pampolha switched from the Brazil Union (União) to the Brazilian Democratic Movement (MDB). This move caused significant political friction with Castro and led to Pampolha's dismissal from the State Secretariat of the Environment in March 2024. Pampolha was appointed to the Rio de Janeiro State Court of Accounts in May 2025, which caused him to resign as Vice-Governor.

Pampolha's resignation opened a path for the President of the Legislative Assembly, Rodrigo Bacellar (Brazil Union), to take over as Governor if Castro also resigned or was removed from office. However, Rodrigo Bacellar was arrested by the Federal Police in December 2025 on suspicion of leaking classified information about criminal investigations to the Comando Vermelho; He was also removed from office as President of the Legislative Assembly. Guilherme Delaroli (Liberal Party) took over as interim President of the Legislative Assembly following Bacellar's arrest.

On 23 March 2026, Governor Cláudio Castro resigned from office, stating that he would run for the Senate in that year's election amid an ongoing case before the Superior Electoral Court (TSE) that could have led to his removal from office. The following day, on 24 March 2026, the TSE convicted Castro and Thiago Pampolha by a 5–2 vote, imposing an eight-year ban from holding public office on both. The Court also annulled Rodrigo Bacellar’s mandate as a state deputy on the same charges. Control of Guanabara Palace then passed to Ricardo Couto de Castro, then-President of the Court of Justice of Rio de Janeiro.

Castro's resignation would, according to state law, ordinarily cause an indirect election to be held in the Legislative Assembly; However, were he to be removed from office by the Superior Electoral Court, there would instead be a direct election. Because he resigned the day before he was convicted, there was a legal impasse as to what form the special election would take. On 17 April 2026, Douglas Ruas (PL) was elected President of the Legislative Assembly, but Cristiano Zanin issued an injunction which kept Ricardo Couto in office as interim Governor until the Supreme Federal Court decided on which form the special election would take. Couto remains in office as interim Governor as of September 2026.

=== Legislative Assembly ===
The result of the 2022 election and the situation as of April 2026 in the Legislative Assembly of Rio de Janeiro is given below. The deadline for legislators to switch party affiliation before the 2026 election was on 4 April 2026.

| Party or alliance | | Votes | % | Seats | | |
| Party or alliance | | Votes | % | Seats won in the 2022 election | Seats held on 4 April 2026 | +/− |
|---|---|---|---|---|---|---|
| Liberal Party | | 1,828,019 | 21.53 | 17 | 23 | ▲6 |
| Brazil Union | | 896,410 | 10.56 | 8 | 5 | ▼3 |
| Brazil of Hope | Workers' Party | 743,051 | 8.75 | 7 | 5 | ▼2 |
| Brazil of Hope | Communist Party of Brazil | 112,005 | 1.32 | 1 | 2 | ▲1 |
| Brazil of Hope | Green Party | 20,480 | 0.24 | 0 | 0 | Steady |
| Social Democratic Party | | 645,331 | 7.60 | 6 | 9 | ▲3 |
| PSOL REDE Federation | Socialism and Liberty Party | 514,436 | 6.06 | 5 | 5 | Steady |
| PSOL REDE Federation | Sustainability Network | 13,656 | 0.16 | 0 | 0 | Steady |
| Progressistas | | 414,957 | 4.89 | 4 | 4 | Steady |
| Solidariedade (Note: The Republican Party of the Social Order was merged into Solidarity in 2023.) (Note: Solidarity formed an official alliance with the Democratic Renewal Party called the Solidary Renewal Federation in 2025.) | | 350,749 | 4.13 | 3 | 3 | Steady |
| Republicanos | | 322,674 | 3.80 | 3 | 3 | Steady |
| Podemos (Note: The Social Christian Party was merged into Podemos in 2023.) | | 306,085 | 3.60 | 2 | 1 | ▼1 |
| Brazilian Democratic Movement | | 295,846 | 3.48 | 2 | 2 | Steady |
| Democratic Labour Party | | 259,306 | 3.05 | 2 | 2 | Steady |
| Republican Party of the Social Order | | 240,658 | 2.83 | 2 | N/A | ▼2 |
| Brazilian Socialist Party | | 221,944 | 2.61 | 2 | 2 | Steady |
| Brazilian Labour Party (Note: The Brazilian Labour Party merged with Patriota in 2023 to form the Democratic Renewal Party.) | | 195,205 | 2.30 | 1 | N/A | ▼1 |
| Patriota | | 154,383 | 1.82 | 1 | N/A | ▼1 |
| Agir | | 144,381 | 1.70 | 1 | 1 | Steady |
| Social Christian Party | | 141,704 | 1.67 | 1 | N/A | ▼1 |
| Party of National Mobilization | | 121,456 | 1.43 | 1 | 0 | ▼1 |
| Avante | | 110,708 | 1.30 | 1 | 1 | Steady |
| Christian Democracy | | 92,745 | 1.09 | 0 | 0 | Steady |
| New Party | | 88,249 | 1.04 | 0 | 0 | Steady |
| Brazilian Labour Renewal Party | | 85,943 | 1.01 | 0 | 0 | Steady |
| Always Forward | Cidadania | 62,296 | 0.73 | 0 | 0 | Steady |
| Always Forward | Brazilian Social Democracy Party | 36,493 | 0.43 | 0 | 1 | ▲1 |
| Brazilian Woman's Party (Note: The Brazilian Woman's Party was renamed to Democrat in 2025.) | | 44,792 | 0.53 | 0 | 0 | Steady |
| Popular Unity | | 15,544 | 0.18 | 0 | 0 | Steady |
| Brazilian Communist Party | | 7,857 | 0.09 | 0 | 0 | Steady |
| United Socialist Workers' Party | | 3,899 | 0.05 | 0 | 0 | Steady |
| Workers' Cause Party | | 0 | 0.00 | 0 | 0 | Steady |
| Democratic Renewal Party | | 0 | 0.00 | New | 1 | ▲1 |
| Total | | 8,491,262 | 100.00 | 70 | 70 | – |
| Valid votes | | 8,491,262 | 87.10 | | | |
| Invalid votes | | 613,470 | 6.29 | | | |
| Blank votes | | 644,435 | 6.61 | | | |
| Total votes | | 9,749,167 | 100.00 | | | |
| Registered voters/turnout | | 12,809,126 | 76.11 | | | |

=== Senator ===
Senators in Brazil serve an 8-year term, meaning the incumbents were elected in 2018. The two Senatorial candidates with the most votes will become Senators, without the need for a majority or any possibility of a second round.

Flávio Bolsonaro, the eldest son of former President Jair Bolsonaro, was elected to the Senate in 2018. A prominent figure in the Liberal Party (PL), he was eligible for re-election. In December 2025, however, he was announced as his father's candidate in the 2026 presidential election.

Carlos Portinho (Liberal Party), a lawyer specializing in sports law, holds the second Senate seat as of March 2026. He was elected as the first alternate to Arolde de Oliveira (PSD) in 2018. Portinho assumed the office permanently in November 2020 after Oliveira died from complications of COVID-19. He is running for a full term.

== Gubernatorial candidates ==
| No. | Governor | | | Vice Governor | | | Coalition Parties |
| No. | Candidate | Party Federation | Relevant offices | Candidate | Party Federation | | Coalition Parties |
|---|---|---|---|---|---|---|---|
| 14 | Coronel Busnello; João Jacques Soares Busnello | MISSÃO | No previous office | Bombeiro Rafa Luz; Rafael Barros Silva da Luz | MISSÃO | No previous office | No coalition |
| 16 | Cyro Garcia; Cyro Garcia | PSTU | No previous office | Perciliana Rodrigues; Perciliana Costa Rodrigues | PSTU | No previous office | No coalition |
| 22 | Douglas Ruas; Douglas Ruas dos Santos | PL | Municipal Secretary of Integrated Management and Special Projects of São Gonçalo (2021–2022); State Secretary of Cities of Rio de Janeiro (2023–2026); State Deputy of Rio de Janeiro (2023–2026); President of the Legislative Assembly of Rio de Janeiro (2026). | Fernanda Louback; Fernanda Anchieta Louback Michelini | PL | Councillor of Niterói (2025–2026). | Rio Real (PL, Avante, PODE, Agir, MOBILIZA) |
| 29 | Luan Monteiro; Luan Monteiro Paschoal Pires | PCO | No previous office | Caetano Albuquerque; Caetano Sigiliano Albuquerque | PCO | No previous office | No coalition |
| 30 | André Marinho; André Bourguignon Marinho | NOVO | No previous office | Tenente Coronel Erigreyce; Erigreyce de Alcântara | NOVO | No previous office | No coalition |
| 50 | William Siri; William Carlos Brum Bispo | PSOL; PSOL REDE Fed. | Councillor of Rio de Janeiro (2021–2026). | Juliana Carvalho; Juliana Carvalho | PSOL; PSOL REDE Fed. | No previous office | PSOL REDE Federation (PSOL and REDE) |
| 55 | Eduardo Paes; Eduardo da Costa Paes | PSD | Sub-mayor of Barra da Tijuca and Jacarepaguá (1993–1996); Councillor of Rio de Janeiro (1997–1999); Federal Deputy for Rio de Janeiro (1999–2007); Municipal Secretary of Environment of Rio de Janeiro (2001–2002); State Secretary of Tourism, Sports and Leisure of Rio de Janeiro (2007–2008); Mayor of Rio de Janeiro (2009–2017; 2021–2026). | Jane Reis; Jeannie Mayr Reis de Oliveira | MDB | No previous office | Juntos para Mudar, Coragem para Reconstruir (PSD, MDB, FE Brasil (PT, PCdoB and PV), PDT, PSB, Solidary Renewal Fed. (PRD and Solidariedade), PSDB Cidadania Fed. (PSDB and Cidadania), Progressive Union Fed. (UNIÃO and PP) and DC) |
| 80 | Juliete Pantoja; Juliete Pantoja Alves | UP | No previous office | Bia Martins; Meiby Jeanine Martins Lima | UP | No previous office | No coalition |

=== Rejected ===
| No. | Governor | | | Vice Governor | | | Coalition Parties |
| No. | Candidate | Party Federation | Relevant offices | Candidate | Party Federation | | Coalition Parties |
|---|---|---|---|---|---|---|---|
| 10 | Anthony Garotinho; Anthony William Matheus de Oliveira | Republicanos | State Deputy of Rio de Janeiro (1987–1988); Mayor of Campos dos Goytacazes (1989–1992; 1997–1998); State Secretary of Agriculture and Interior of Rio de Janeiro (1992–1993); Governor of Rio de Janeiro (1999–2002); First Gentleman of Rio de Janeiro (2003–2006); State Secretary of Public Security of Rio de Janeiro (2003–2004); Federal Deputy for Rio de Janeiro (2011–2015). | André Monteiro; Luiz André de Moura Monteiro | Democrata | No previous office | Coragem para Mudar (Republicanos and Democrata) |

=== Declined or withdrew ===
- Flávio Bolsonaro (PL), lawyer, Senator (since 2019), former State Deputy (2003–2019), and candidate for Mayor of Rio de Janeiro in 2016.
- Washington Reis (MDB), businessman, former Secretary of Transport of Rio de Janeiro State (2023–2025), former Mayor of Duque de Caxias (2005-2008, 2017–2022), former Federal Deputy (2011–2017) and candidate for Vice-Governor of Rio de Janeiro in 2022.
- Ricardo Couto (Independent), judge, professor at Fundação Getulio Vargas and interim Governor of Rio de Janeiro since March 2026.

=== Ineligible ===
- Rodrigo Bacellar (União), lawyer, President of the Legislative Assembly of Rio de Janeiro (2023-2025), State Deputy (2019-2026) and former Secretary of Government of Rio de Janeiro State (2021–2022).

== Senatorial candidates ==
| No. | Senator | | | Substitute members | Coalition Parties |
| No. | Candidate | Party Federation | Relevant offices | Substitute members | Coalition Parties |
|---|---|---|---|---|---|
| 100 | Marcelo Crivella; Marcelo Bezerra Crivella | Republicanos | Senator for Rio de Janeiro (2003–2017); Minister of Fishing and Aquaculture (2012–2014); Mayor of Rio de Janeiro (2017–2021); Federal Deputy for Rio de Janeiro (2023–2026). | Tânia Bastos (Republicanos) Francisco Eugenio (Republicanos) | No coalition |
| 101 | Waguinho; Wagner dos Santos Carneiro | Republicanos | Councillor of Belford Roxo (2009–2011); State Deputy of Rio de Janeiro (2011–2017); Mayor of Belford Roxo (2017–2024). | André Soares (Republicanos) Dra. Renata (Republicanos) | No coalition |
| 131 | Benedita da Silva; Benedita Sousa da Silva Sampaio | PT; FE Brasil | Councillor of Rio de Janeiro (1983–1986); Senator for Rio de Janeiro (1995–1998); Vice Governor of Rio de Janeiro (1999–2002); Governor of Rio de Janeiro (2002); Minister of Social Assistance and Promotion (2003–2007); State Secretary of Social Assistance and Human Rights of Rio de Janeiro (2007–2010); Federal Deputy for Rio de Janeiro (1987–1995; 2011–2026). | Manoel Severino (PT) Kleber Lucas (PT) | Juntos para Mudar, Coragem para Reconstruir (PSD, MDB, FE Brasil (PT, PCdoB and PV), PDT, PSB, Solidary Renewal Fed. (PRD and Solidariedade), PSDB Cidadania Fed. (PSDB and Cidadania), Progressive Union Fed. (UNIÃO and PP) and DC) |
| 144 | Hélio Secco; Hélio Kinast Cruz Secco | MISSÃO | No previous office | Moisés Queiroz (MISSÃO) Ramon Batista (MISSÃO) | No coalition |
| 160 | Paula Falcão; Paula Andreia Almeida Falcão | PSTU | No previous office | (PSTU) (PSTU) | No coalition |
| 200 | Marcos Dias; Marcos Dias Pereira | PODE | Councillor of Rio de Janeiro (2025–2026). | Eliane Diniz (PODE) Rafael JJ (PODE) | No coalition |
| 221 | Carlos Jordy; Carlos Roberto Jordy Coelho de Mattos | PL | Councillor of Niterói (2017–2018); Federal Deputy for Rio de Janeiro (2019–2026). | Lucimar Ferreira (PL) Zé Augusto Nalin (PL) | No coalition |
| 222 | Carlos Portinho; Carlos Francisco Portinho | PL | Municipal Secretary of Housing of Rio de Janeiro (2015); Senator for Rio de Janeiro (2020–2026). | Samuel Malafaia (PL) Marcelinho (PL) | No coalition |
| 280 | Luciano Mattos; Luciano Oliveira Mattos de Souza | PRTB | No previous office | Murilo Romero (PRTB) Ricardo Fernandes (PRTB) | No coalition |
| 290 | Luiz Eugênio Honorato; Luiz Eugênio Honorato | PCO | No previous office | Antônio de Paula (PCO) Guilherme dos Santos (PCO) | No coalition |
| 355 | Ó Clemente; Clemente Sebastião de Almeida Campos | Democrata | No previous office | Alberto Barbosa (Democrata) Jorge Page (Democrata) | No coalition |
| 500 | Mônica Benício; Monica Tereza Azeredo Benicio | PSOL; PSOL REDE Fed. | Councillor of Rio de Janeiro (2021–2026). | Vanderlea Aguiar (PSOL) Maria dos Camelôs (PSOL) | PSOL REDE Federation (PSOL and REDE) |
| 555 | Pedro Paulo; Pedro Paulo | PSD | State Deputy of Rio de Janeiro (2007–2011); Federal Deputy for Rio de Janeiro (2011–2026); Municipal Secretary of Finance and Planning of Rio de Janeiro (2021–2022). | Miro Teixeira (PDT) Sávio Neves (PSDB) | Juntos para Mudar, Coragem para Reconstruir (PSD, MDB, FE Brasil (PT, PCdoB and PV), PDT, PSB, Solidary Renewal Fed. (PRD and Solidariedade), PSDB Cidadania Fed. (PSDB and Cidadania), Progressive Union Fed. (UNIÃO and PP) and DC) |
| 800 | Michelly Xavier; Michelly Xavier de Souza | UP | No previous office | Roberto Vasconcellos (UP) Elza do MLB (UP) | No coalition |
| 808 | Vinicius Benevides; Vinicius Benevides dos Santos Conceição | UP | No previous office | Gabriela Gonçalves (UP) George Thompson (UP) | No coalition |

=== Declined or withdrew ===
- Flávio Bolsonaro (PL), lawyer, current Senator (since 2019), former State Deputy (2003–2019), and candidate for Mayor of Rio de Janeiro in 2016.

=== Ineligible ===
- Cláudio Castro (PL), lawyer, former Governor of Rio de Janeiro (2021-2026), former Vice-Governor of Rio de Janeiro (2019-2021) and former City Councillor of Rio de Janeiro (2017-2019).

== Results ==
=== Governor ===
| Candidate | Running mate | Party | Votes | % |
|---|---|---|---|---|
| Douglas Ruas | Fernanda Louback | Liberal Party | 4,271,199 | 50.88 |
| Eduardo Paes | Jane Reis (MDB) | Social Democratic Party | 3,706,984 | 44.16 |
| Anthony Garotinho | André Monteiro (Democrata) | Republicanos | 274,411 | |
| William Siri | Juliana Carvalho | Socialism and Liberty Party | 235,347 | 2.80 |
| João Jacques Busnello | Rafael Luz | Mission Party | 84,889 | 1.01 |
| André Marinho | Erigreyce Monteiro | New Party | 45,359 | 0.54 |
| Juliete Pantoja | Bia Martins | Popular Unity | 33,430 | 0.40 |
| Cyro Garcia | Perciliana Rodrigues | United Socialist Workers' Party | 14,642 | 0.17 |
| Luan Monteiro | Caetano Albuquerque | Workers' Cause Party | 2,777 | 0.03 |
| Total | | | 8,394,627 | 100.00 |
| Valid votes | | | 8,394,627 | 85.26 |
| Invalid votes | | | 949,703 | 9.65 |
| Blank votes | | | 501,537 | 5.09 |
| Total votes | | | 9,845,867 | 100.00 |
| Registered voters/turnout | | | 12,842,517 | 76.67 |

Popular vote
| Ruas | 50.88% |
| Paes | 44.16% |
| Siri | 2.80% |
| Others | 2.15% |

=== Senator ===
| Candidate | Party | Votes | % |
|---|---|---|---|
| Carlos Portinho (incumbent) | PL | 4,264,932 | 26.77 |
| Carlos Jordy | PL | 3,912,405 | 24.56 |
| Benedita da Silva | PT | 3,220,765 | 20.22 |
| Pedro Paulo | PSD | 1,904,352 | 11.95 |
| Mônica Benício | PSOL | 1,538,444 | 9.66 |
| Marcelo Crivella | Republicanos | 539,598 | 3.39 |
| Marcos Dias | PODE | 194,605 | 1.22 |
| Helio Secco | MISSÃO | 131,065 | 0.82 |
| Waguinho | Republicanos | 116,453 | 0.73 |
| Michelly Xavier | UP | 31,492 | 0.20 |
| Paula Falcão | PSTU | 27,631 | 0.17 |
| Luciano Mattos | PRTB | 23,911 | 0.15 |
| Clemente Campos | Democrata | 9,176 | 0.06 |
| Vinicius Benevides | UP | 8,828 | 0.06 |
| Luiz Eugenio | PCO | 5,825 | 0.04 |
| Total | | 15,929,482 | 100.00 |
| Valid votes | | 15,929,482 | 80.89 |
| Invalid votes | | 2,061,486 | 10.47 |
| Blank votes | | 1,700,766 | 8.64 |
| Total votes | | 19,691,734 | 100.00 |
| Registered voters/turnout | | 12,842,517 | 76.67 |
| PL hold | | | |

Popular vote
| Portinho | 26.77% |
| Jordy | 24.56% |
| Benedita | 20.22% |
| Paulo | 11.95% |
| Benício | 9.66% |
| Others | 6.84% |

=== Chamber of Deputies ===
| Party or alliance | | Votes | % | Seats | +/– |
|---|---|---|---|---|---|
| Liberal Party | | 2,380,229 | 27.22 | 15 | ▲4 |
| Brazil of Hope | Workers' Party | 1,068,309 | 12.22 | 6 | ▲1 |
| Brazil of Hope | Communist Party of Brazil | 195,821 | 2.24 | 2 | ▲1 |
| Brazil of Hope | Green Party | 96,912 | 1.11 | 0 | Steady |
| PSDB Cidadania | Brazilian Social Democracy Party | 722,006 | 8.26 | 4 | ▲4 |
| PSDB Cidadania | Cidadania | 11,347 | 0.13 | 0 | Steady |
| Progressive Union | Progressistas | 687,160 | 7.86 | 5 | ▲2 |
| Progressive Union | Brazil Union | 380,456 | 4.35 | 1 | ▼5 |
| Social Democratic Party | | 685,212 | 7.84 | 4 | Steady |
| PSOL REDE | Socialism and Liberty Party | 637,110 | 7.29 | 4 | ▼1 |
| PSOL REDE | Sustainability Network | 19,208 | 0.22 | 0 | Steady |
| Brazilian Democratic Movement | | 315,595 | 3.61 | 1 | ▼1 |
| Republicanos | | 297,377 | 3.40 | 1 | ▼2 |
| Democratic Labour Party | | 228,883 | 2.62 | 1 | Steady |
| Solidary Renewal | Solidariedade | 226,778 | 2.59 | 1 | Steady |
| Solidary Renewal | Democratic Renewal Party | 66,502 | 0.76 | 0 | ▼1 |
| New Party | | 171,840 | 1.97 | 1 | Steady |
| Avante | | 159,772 | 1.83 | 0 | Steady |
| Brazilian Socialist Party | | 124,173 | 1.42 | 0 | ▼1 |
| Podemos | | 111,166 | 1.27 | 0 | ▼1 |
| Mission Party | | 75,096 | 0.86 | 0 | New |
| Christian Democracy | | 48,201 | 0.55 | 0 | Steady |
| National Mobilization | | 14,561 | 0.17 | 0 | Steady |
| Democrata | | 13,657 | 0.16 | 0 | Steady |
| Popular Unity | | 3,648 | 0.04 | 0 | Steady |
| United Socialist Workers' Party | | 2,067 | 0.02 | 0 | Steady |
| Workers' Cause Party | | 667 | 0.01 | 0 | Steady |
| Total | | 8,743,753 | 100.00 | 46 | – |
| Valid votes | | 8,743,753 | 88.81 | | |
| Invalid votes | | 583,717 | 5.93 | | |
| Blank votes | | 518,397 | 5.27 | | |
| Total votes | | 9,845,867 | 100.00 | | |
| Registered voters/turnout | | 12,842,517 | 76.67 | | |

=== Legislative Assembly ===
| Party or alliance | | Votes | % | Seats | +/– |
|---|---|---|---|---|---|
| Liberal Party | | 2,222,189 | 26.21 | 21 | ▼2 |
| Social Democratic Party | | 1,043,551 | 12.31 | 9 | Steady |
| Brazil of Hope | Workers' Party | 839,964 | 9.91 | 9 | ▲4 |
| Brazil of Hope | Communist Party of Brazil | 209,141 | 2.47 | 1 | ▼1 |
| Brazil of Hope | Green Party | 36,612 | 0.43 | 0 | Steady |
| PSOL REDE | Socialism and Liberty Party | 559,332 | 6.60 | 5 | Steady |
| PSOL REDE | Sustainability Network | 9,076 | 0.11 | 0 | Steady |
| Progressive Union | Brazil Union | 496,623 | 5.86 | 4 | ▼1 |
| Progressive Union | Progressistas | 488,908 | 5.77 | 5 | ▲1 |
| Republicanos | | 324,537 | 3.83 | 3 | Steady |
| Democratic Labour Party | | 300,658 | 3.55 | 2 | Steady |
| Brazilian Democratic Movement | | 299,878 | 3.54 | 2 | Steady |
| Brazilian Socialist Party | | 271,553 | 3.20 | 2 | Steady |
| Solidary Renewal | Solidariedade | 225,500 | 2.66 | 2 | ▼1 |
| Solidary Renewal | Democratic Renewal Party | 98,244 | 1.16 | 1 | – |
| PSDB Cidadania | Brazilian Social Democracy Party | 216,795 | 2.56 | 1 | Steady |
| PSDB Cidadania | Cidadania | 4,890 | 0.06 | 0 | Steady |
| New Party | | 205,035 | 2.42 | 1 | ▲1 |
| Agir | | 198,382 | 2.34 | 1 | Steady |
| Avante | | 120,161 | 1.42 | 0 | ▼1 |
| Christian Democracy | | 107,278 | 1.27 | 1 | ▲1 |
| Podemos | | 73,369 | 0.87 | 0 | ▼1 |
| Mission Party | | 59,730 | 0.70 | 0 | New |
| National Mobilization | | 42,062 | 0.50 | 0 | Steady |
| Democrata | | 16,488 | 0.19 | 0 | Steady |
| Popular Unity | | 6,348 | 0.07 | 0 | Steady |
| United Socialist Workers' Party | | 2,298 | 0.03 | 0 | Steady |
| Workers' Cause Party | | 903 | 0.01 | 0 | Steady |
| Total | | 8,479,505 | 100.00 | 70 | – |
| Valid votes | | 8,479,505 | 86.12 | | |
| Invalid votes | | 795,509 | 8.08 | | |
| Blank votes | | 570,853 | 5.80 | | |
| Total votes | | 9,845,867 | 100.00 | | |
| Registered voters/turnout | | 12,842,517 | 76.67 | | |
