= André Ceciliano =

Brazilian politician and lawyer

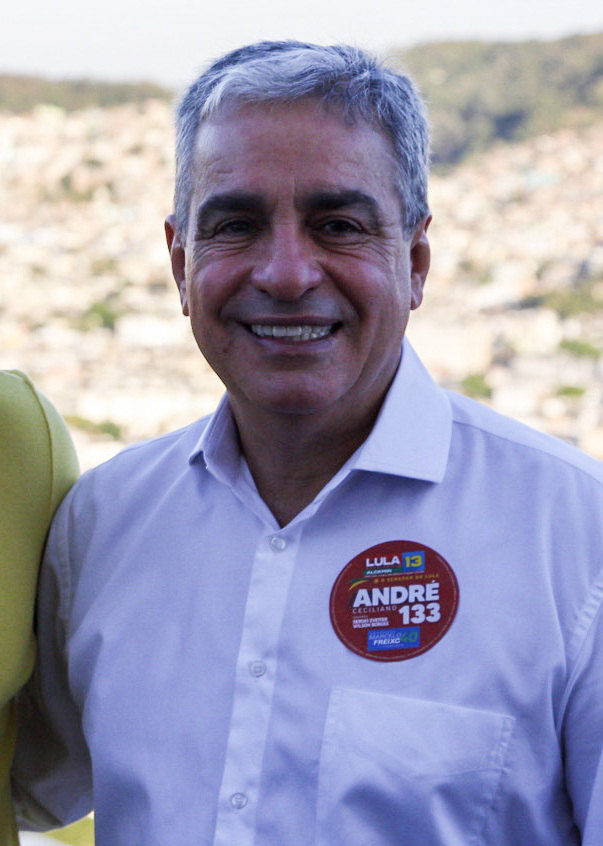

President of the Legislative Assembly of Rio de Janeiro
- In office February 1, 2019 – February 1, 2023
- Preceded by: Wagner Montes
- Succeeded by: Rodrigo Bacellar

Legislative Assembly of the State of Rio de Janeiro
- In office February 1, 1999 – December 31, 2000

Legislative Assembly of the State of Rio de Janeiro
- In office February 1, 2011 – February 1, 2023

Mayor of Paracambi
- In office January 1, 2001 – January 1, 2009

Personal details
- Born: February 28, 1968 (age 58) Nilópolis, Rio de Janeiro, Brazil
- Party: PT (1996–present)
- Profession: Lawyer, politician

André Luiz Ceciliano (born February 28, 1968) is a Brazilian lawyer and politician affiliated with the Workers' Party (PT). He served as mayor of Paracambi twice and was elected state deputy of Rio de Janeiro four times. Ceciliano was also the president of the Legislative Assembly of Rio de Janeiro (ALERJ). He ran for a seat in the Federal Senate of Brazil in the 2022 Rio de Janeiro state election, but was defeated by Romário.

== Biography ==
Born in Nilópolis to an Italian family (originally "Siciliano"), Ceciliano moved to Paracambi at the age of five. In 1996, at the age of 28, he entered politics, running for the first time for the office of mayor of Paracambi, but was not elected, losing by a margin of 97 votes.

Two years later, in 1998, he ran for state deputy and was elected with 19,122 votes. During his first term, he was elected third vice president of the Legislative Assembly of Rio de Janeiro (ALERJ) board of directors for the 1999–2000 biennium.

=== Mayor of Paracambi ===
In the bid for reelection as mayor in 2004, Ceciliano was defeated by a margin of 528 votes. His coalition appealed to the Regional Electoral Court of Rio de Janeiro (TRE-RJ), claiming to have provided evidence of vote buying. In a subsequent ruling, the TRE-RJ annulled the mandate of the then-inaugurated Flavio Campos Ferreira, restoring the control of Paracambi's city hall to André Ceciliano.

At the end of his term as mayor of Paracambi, Ceciliano ran for mayor in the neighboring municipality of Japeri, finishing in second place.

=== State representative ===
In 2011, he returned to the ALERJ, having been elected with 28,035 votes in the 2010 Rio de Janeiro state elections. He was re-elected in 2014 for the 2015–2019 term with 31,207 votes. He was elected Vice President of the ALERJ for the 2015–2016 term and again for the following biennium (2017–2018). In the 2018 elections, Ceciliano was re-elected state deputy for the 12th term (2019–2023) of ALERJ, with 46,893 votes.

He co-authored a law prohibiting strip searches during prison visits in the state. In April 2015, in a controversial vote, he was among the parliamentarians who voted in favor of appointing Domingos Brazão to the Tribunal de Contas do Estado do Rio de Janeiro, a nomination widely criticized at the time.

In February 2017, he was one of the 41 state deputies who voted in favor of the privatization of the State Water and Sewage Company of Rio de Janeiro popularly known as CEADE, with the aim of regularizing the state's payroll and ensuring its return to the Fiscal Recovery Regime (RRF); he was also one of the 45 deputies who voted in favor of removing this guarantee on September 18, 2018, when it was replaced by a claim receivable from the federal government, originating from a Supreme Court ruling. Later, in April, he proposed and voted in favor of a bill suspending the company's auction, arguing that the auction could not proceed before the RRF extension; after ALERJ approved the suspension, the state government maintained the CEDAE auction through a decree issued by Governor Cláudio Castro.

He authored a bill that reserves 10% of state public service positions across all three branches of government for economically disadvantaged populations.

=== President of ALERJ ===
On April 11, 2017, André Ceciliano temporarily assumed the presidency of the ALERJ due to the medical leave of the then-president Jorge Picciani. The first vice-president, Wagner Montes, was also unable to take the position for health reasons.

On November 17, 2017, Ceciliano voted for the revocation of the arrest of the deputies Jorge Picciani, Paulo Melo, and Edson Albertassi, who were accused in the Cadeia Velha operation of being part of a criminal scheme involving public officials from the executive and legislative branches, as well as the State Court of Auditors, along with major construction and transportation entrepreneurs.

Ceciliano was responsible for conducting the vote on the Fiscal Recovery Regime (RRF) bills in 2017. During the signing ceremony of the fiscal recovery agreement at the Guanabara Palace, he urged Finance Minister Henrique Meirelles to establish a new fiscal policy for relations between Petrobras and the state.

In December 2018, a 422-page report produced by the Conselho de Controle de Atividades Financeiras (Coaf) was released, which had been submitted by the Ministério Público Federal to the investigation originating from Furna da Onça operation. The report gained significant national attention as it involved a former parliamentary aide to Flávio Bolsonaro, son of President Jair Bolsonaro. The document details information on the banking operations of 75 employees and former staffers of the ALERJ, cited in reports of suspicious financial transactions. The suspicious operations, involving individuals working or having worked in 20 offices of state deputies from various political backgrounds, amounted to over R$207 million.

The Coaf report showed that employees in André Ceciliano's ALERJ office moved a total of R$49.3 million between January 2016 and January 2017, the highest value noted in the document. According to the report, the suspicious transactions were conducted by four of Ceciliano's staffers: Elisangela Barbieri, Carlos Alberto Dolavale, Benjamim Barbieri, and Ana Paula Pereira Alves.

In a statement, Ceciliano's office clarified that of the aides named in the Coaf report for suspected transactions, Elisangela and Ana Paula were still working for the deputy as of December 2018, Carlos Alberto served as a parliamentary aide from February 2011 to March 2012, and Benjamim, Elisangela's father, never worked for his office. The Ministério Público Federal, in a separate note, clarified that not all the suspicious activities mentioned in the document were necessarily illicit. In February 2021, the Tribunal de Justiça do Estado do Rio de Janeiro found no evidence of Ceciliano's involvement in a "kickback" scheme with his staffers, and the case was downgraded to lower courts, continuing only against Ceciliano's former aide, Carlos Dolavale.

In February 2019, Ceciliano was elected president of the ALERJ, being the only candidate in the race, with 49 votes. In February 2021, also in a single slate, he was re-elected president of the ALERJ with 64 votes.

On March 9, 2021, the ALERJ approved Bill 3,489/21, authored by Ceciliano, which changed the name of the Maracanã stadium, officially named Estádio Jornalista Mário Filho, to "Edson Arantes do Nascimento - King Pelé Stadium," with the intention of honoring Pelé during his lifetime by naming Brazil's most important football venue after him. The change elicited negative reactions from the general public, the press, the journalist's family, and historians who questioned the appropriateness of the name change. Governor Cláudio Castro vetoed the project, responding to a request from ALERJ amid the backlash against the renaming.

=== Candidate for the Senate in 2022 ===
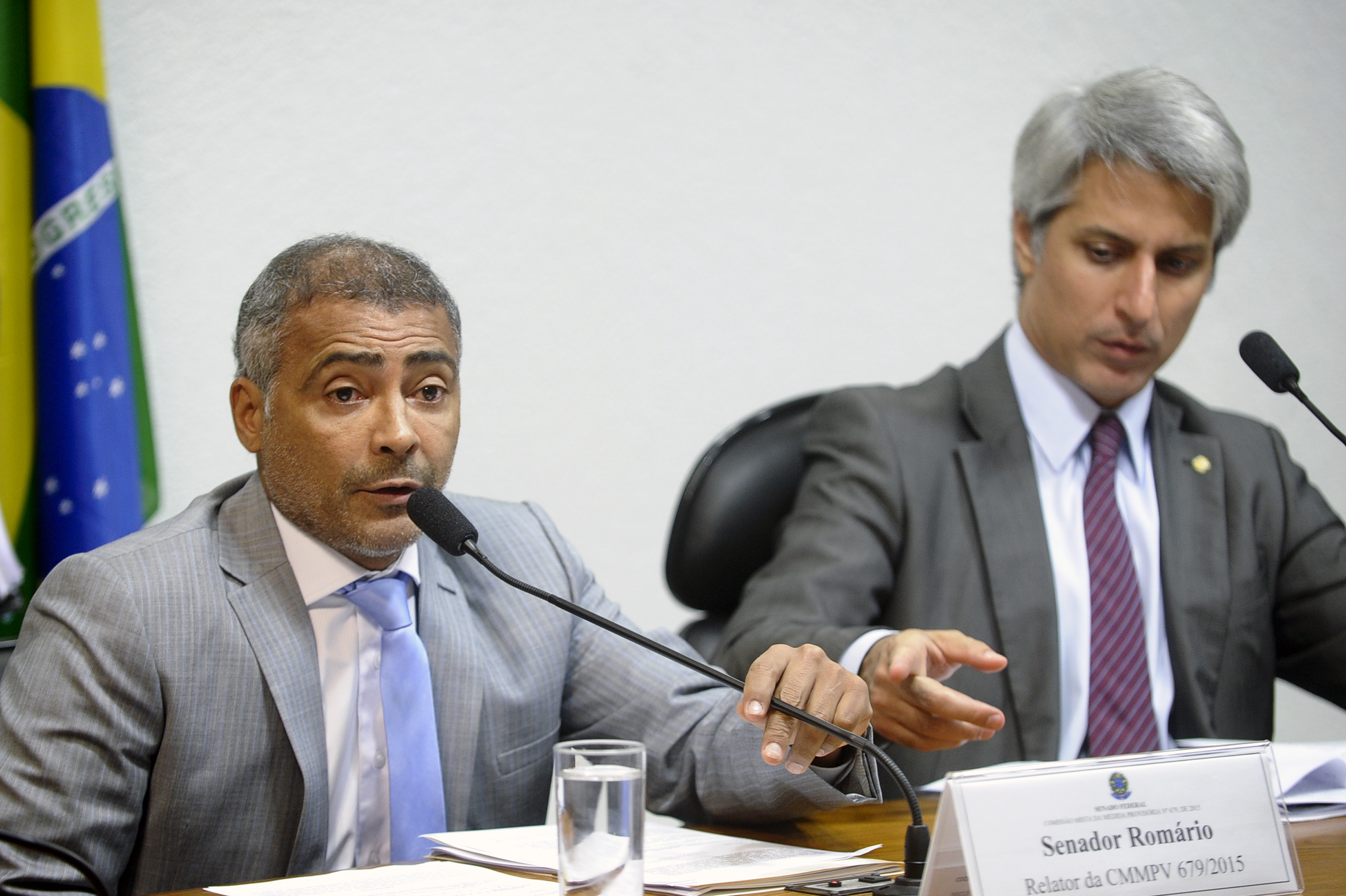
Romário and Alessandro Molon were Ceciliano's competitors for the Senate seat in 2022

Ceciliano was confirmed as a candidate for the Federal Senate by the PT in the 2022 elections at the state convention of the FE Brazil of Hope, which PT is part of, supporting the candidacies of Marcelo Freixo for the state government and Luiz Inácio Lula da Silva for the presidency. He received support from the other parties of FE Brasil (PCdoB and PV) and from the Solidarity.

Criticized by members of the PSB, PSOL, and other left-wing groups such as artists and influencers, due to his closeness to Governor Cláudio Castro and other bolsonarist politicians; and for pressuring Alessandro Molon, the PSB federal deputy, to withdraw from the Senate race, despite Molon leading Ceciliano in the polls and being closer to surpassing Romário, the re-election candidate from the PL. Ceciliano and his allies, including other artists and intellectuals, argued that the PSB had broken an agreement to support Ceciliano as the coalition's Senate candidate, which Molon denied having made. Ceciliano and Molon continued their campaigns separately, both supporting Freixo and Lula.

Ceciliano finished fifth in the election, with 986,676 votes (12.08% of the valid votes), losing to Romário, who was re-elected with 2,384,331 votes (29.19% of the valid votes). His son, Andrezinho Ceciliano, was elected to the ALERJ with 54,851 votes.

=== Return to Alerj ===
After losing his bid for the Senate in 2022, André Ceciliano returned to run for a seat in the Alerj. In the 2026 election, he was elected after receiving just over 70,000 votes, ranking as the 21st-highest vote-getter in the state for that office overall, and the third-highest vote-getter from the PT.
