= Picciani =

Picciani is a surname. Notable people with the surname include:

- Jorge Picciani (1955–2021), Brazilian cattle rancher and politician
- Leonardo Picciani (born 1979), Brazilian lawyer and politician
- Rafael Picciani (born 1986), Brazilian politician

== See also ==
- Piccinni
