= Murder of Ana Clara Machado =

2021 murder in Niterói, Brazil

- Location: Cantagalo, Pendotiba, Niterói, Rio de Janeiro
- Date: 2 February 2021
- Attack type: Murder
- Weapon: Firearm
- Victim: Ana Clara Machado
- Perpetrator: Bruno Dias Delaroli

On February 2, 2021, five-year-old Ana Clara Gomes Machado was killed by a rifle shot allegedly fired from the weapon of military police officer Bruno Dias Delaroli, according to the indictment filed by the Rio de Janeiro State Public Prosecutor’s Office (MPRJ). Machado was playing outside her home in Cantagalo, in the Pendotiba area of Niterói, when she was struck by two shots fired from a police vehicle conducting a routine patrol, and she died instantly. Her two-year-old brother witnesed the shooting. The case returned to the spotlight in 2026, during the 2026 presidential election campaign, due to candidate Flávio Bolsonaro’s (PL) involvement in defending Delaroli.

Petition to the Superior Court of Justice filed by Flávio Bolsonaro, acting as defense counsel for the police officer accused of murdering Ana Clara

Machado was buried at the São Francisco Xavier Cemetery in São Francisco. Family members held a march carrying signs calling for peace and demanding an end to police violence against children. Two days after the crime, Delaroli was ordered to be held in pretrial detention and was arrested. At the time, he was already facing charges for another homicide; he had previously been convicted in the lower court for the 2014 killing of a motorcyclist, who was shot three times in the back—a crime that the court ruled in 2018 was committed “for a trivial reason”—and was awaiting trial while out on bail.

According to the report from the Niterói Homicide Division, 7.62mm rifle cartridges—the same type used by the Military Police—were recovered, and “no pistol cartridge casings were found, the type of firearm allegedly used by the criminals at the scene,” and the police officers’ testimony was inconsistent with the witnesses’ accounts. Judge Monique Brandão dos Santos Moreira’s ruling also highlighted the account of a witness who accused the police officers of returning to the crime scene to collect the rifle shell casings.

According to a statement Cristiane Gomes, the girl's mother, gave to UOL, she said she had to beg the police officers to come to the girl's aid.

I had to beg and insist that they help my daughter. She was in agony. The police officer didn't want to pick her up. She had lost a lot of blood. After a few minutes, the other police officer said to his colleague, “Pick up the girl—you messed up.” We lost a few minutes because of that.

— Cristiane Gomes,

Machado was taken to Azevedo Lima State Hospital, where she received medical care, but died there.

Delaroli was reportedly released in late 2021 and has been out on bail ever since.

The case—yet another in a series of deaths during police operations—gained greater media attention in 2024. After a court ruled that Military Police Corporal Bruno Delaroli would face a jury trial, Senator and attorney Flávio Bolsonaro joined his defense team, filing a petition with the Superior Court of Justice to delay the trial. The court denied the appeal. The case has raised questions among opposition politicians, such as Marcelo Freixo, who questions why a senator would use his political influence to defend a police officer accused of murdering a five-year-old girl.

On September 30, 2026, the case was featured in the third episode of the series Revelando, titled “The Trial That Never Happened,” hosted by actress Camila Pitanga. The episode covered news reports on the case and included a statement from the girl’s mother, drawing parallels between this case and other murders committed by police officers honored by Flávio Bolsonaro, such as Adriano da Nóbrega.

Throughout the election campaign, the issue came up, with Lula’s 2026 presidential campaign addressing the case during political advertising slots and with candidate Flávio Bolsonaro being questioned during the debate hosted by Band on October 18, 2026. The mention led to an explosive surge in online searches, with the term “flavio bolsonaro caso ana clara” rising to the top of users' search interests, showing a more than 1,000% increase in the following 24 hours.

== See also ==
- Guilherme Delaroli
- Marcelo Delaroli
