= Andrezinho Ceciliano =

Brazilian politician

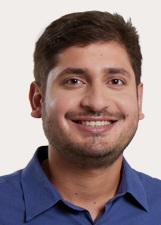
- Andrezinho Ceciliano, 2024

Assembly Member for Legislative Assembly of Rio de Janeiro
- In office 1 February 2023 – present

Personal details
- Born: André Luiz Ramalho Ceciliano; August 1, 1998 (age 28) Paracambi, Rio de Janeiro, Brazil
- Party: PT (2021–present)
- Profession: politician
- Known for: Member of the Legislative Assembly of Rio de Janeiro

André Luiz Ramalho Ceciliano, better known as Andrezinho Ceciliano (August 1, 1998) is a Brazilian law student and politician affiliated with the Workers' Party.

== Biography ==
=== First years and education ===
The son of politician and Rio de Janeiro state deputy André Ceciliano and physician Ludimilla Ramalho, André was born in the town of Paracambi, in the interior of the state of Rio de Janeiro, in 1998. He has been involved in politics since he was a child, influenced by his father, who was mayor of the city at the time.

He is currently a law student.

=== Political ===
Affiliated to the Workers' Party, in 2022 he stood for election in the state of Rio de Janeiro, seeking a seat in the state's Legislative Assembly, a position his father held for four terms. He was elected with 54,851 votes, making him the youngest person ever to occupy a seat in the Legislative Assembly.

In February 2024, he voted in favor of maintaining the mandate of congresswoman Lucinha, who had been removed from office by the Court of Justice of the State of Rio de Janeiro, accused of having links with militia members.

In 2024, he was elected mayor of Paracambi after receiving 64% of the votes.

==== Electoral performance ====
Year	Election	Party	Position	Votes	%	Result	Ref
2022	2022 Rio de Janeiro gubernatorial election	PT	State deputy	54.851	0,64	Elected	
2024	2024 Pacarambi municipal election	PT	Mayor	16.401	64,11	Elected	
