= Rafael Picciani =

Brazilian politician (born 1986)

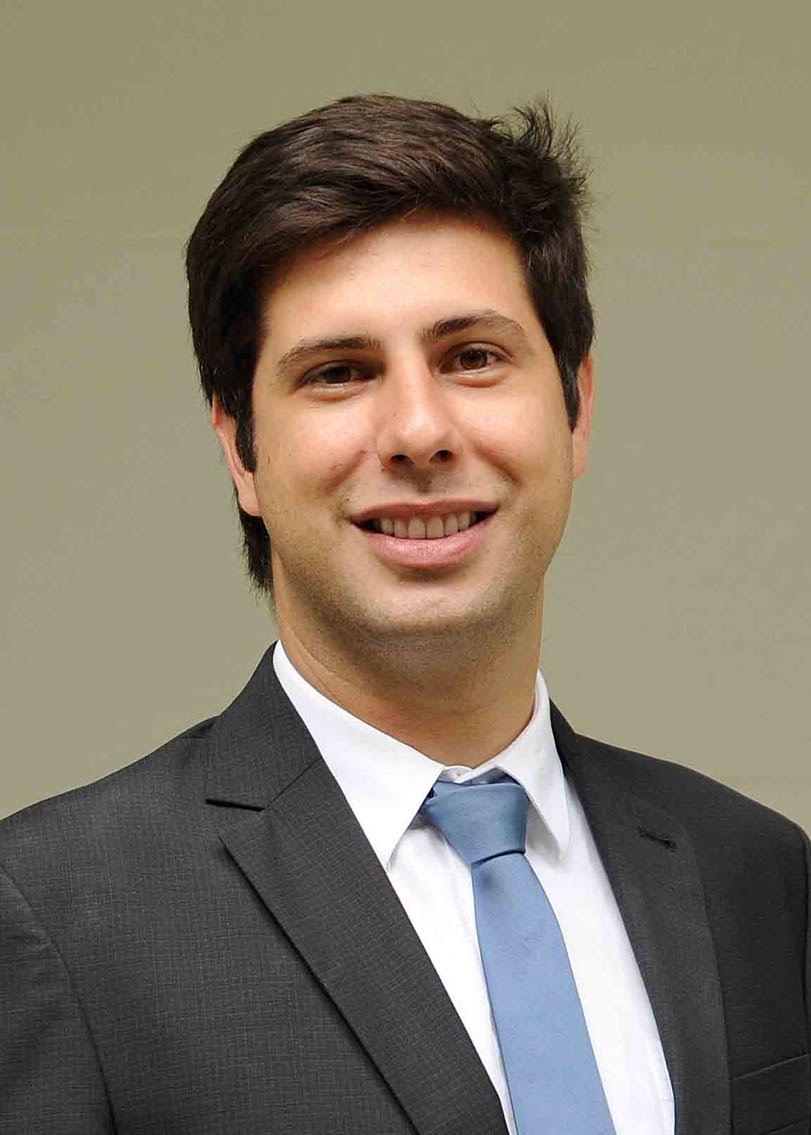
- Picciani in 2016

Member of the Legislative Assembly of Rio de Janeiro
- Incumbent
- Assumed office from June 3, 2024 to July 5, 2024 and again from September 3, 2025
- Preceded by: Otoni de Paula Pai (2023–2024) - TH Joias (2024–2025)
- In office 1 February 2011 – 31 January 2019

Personal details
- Born: 2 April 1986 (age 40)
- Party: Brazil Union (Union)
- Parent: Jorge Picciani (father)
- Relatives: Leonardo Picciani (brother)

Rafael Carneiro Monteiro Picciani (born 2 April 1986) is a Brazilian politician. He has been a State representative of the Legislative Assembly of Rio de Janeiro since 2025, having previously served from 2011 to 2019 and June–July 2024: On leave to serve as the Rio de Janeiro State Secretary for Sports and Leisure. He is the son of Jorge Picciani and the brother of Leonardo Picciani.
