= Rodrigo Bacellar =

Brazilian politician (born 1980)

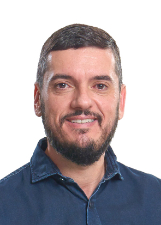
- Bacellar in 2022

President of the Legislative Assembly of Rio de Janeiro
- In office 2 February 2023 – 24 March 2026; Suspended: 3 December 2025 – 24 March 2026
- Preceded by: André Ceciliano
- Succeeded by: Guilherme Delaroli (acting)

Secretary of Government of Rio de Janeiro
- In office 7 October 2022 – 2 February 2023
- Governor: Cláudio Castro
- Preceded by: Rafael Thompson
- Succeeded by: André Moura
- In office 28 May 2021 – 1 April 2022
- Governor: Cláudio Castro
- Preceded by: André Lazaroni
- Succeeded by: Rafael Thompson

Member of the Legislative Assembly of Rio de Janeiro
- In office 1 February 2023 – 24 March 2026; Suspended: 3 December 2025 – 24 March 2026
- Constituency: At-large
- In office 1 April 2022 – 7 October 2022
- Constituency: At-large
- In office 1 February 2019 – 28 May 2021
- Constituency: At-large

Personal details
- Born: 5 April 1980 (age 46) Campos dos Goytacazes, Rio de Janeiro, Brazil
- Party: UNIÃO (since 2024)
- Other political affiliations: PT (2001–2005); PTB (2005–2009); PTdoB (2009–2011); PDT (2011–2013); Solidariedade (2013–2016); PMDB (2016–2018); Solidariedade (2018–2022); PL (2022–2024)
- Spouse: Manoella Duarte
- Education: Estácio de Sá University

Rodrigo da Silva Bacellar (born 5 April 1980) is a Brazilian politician. He has been a former member of the Legislative Assembly of Rio de Janeiro from 2019 to 2026 When was the mandate of the state representative terminated by the Superior Electoral Court of Brazil and has served as president of the assembly from 2023 to 2025. From 2021 to 2022, he served as secretary of government of Rio de Janeiro.

On December 3, 2025, Rodrigo Bacellar was arrested by the Brazilian Federal Police during Operation Unha e Carne, suspected of leaking confidential information about another police operation that led to the arrest of then-state deputy TH Joias, associated with the Comando Vermelho.

The Federal Police indicated that Bacellar had instructed TH Joias to destroy evidence. Five days later, the ALERJ (State Legislative Assembly of Rio de Janeiro) revoked his arrest by a vote of 42 to 21.
