= Leonardo Picciani =

Brazilian lawyer and politician

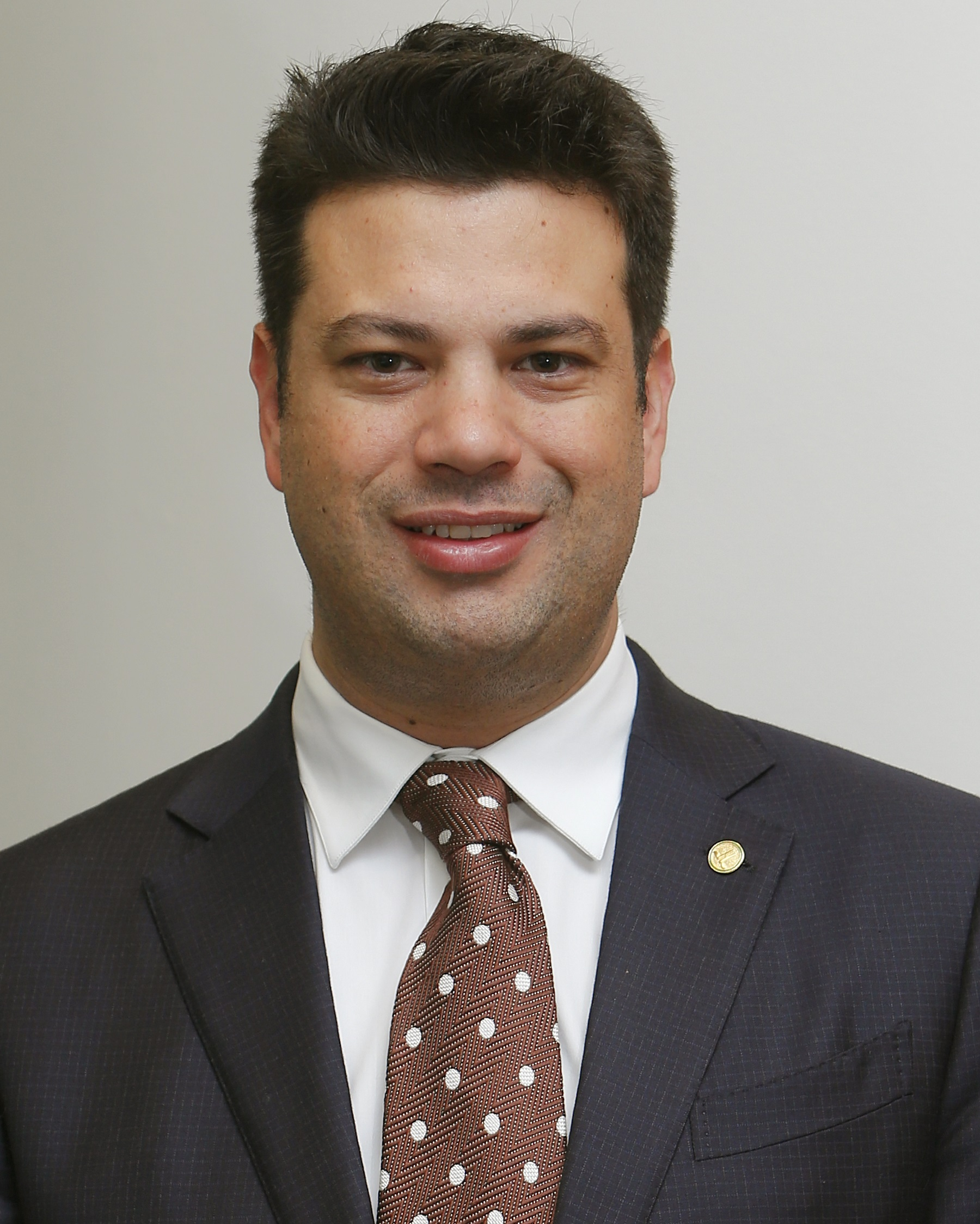

Federal Deputy
- In office 25 June 2021 – 1 April 2022
- Constituency: Rio de Janeiro
- In office 1 February 2003 – 1 February 2019
- Constituency: Rio de Janeiro

Minister of Sports
- In office 12 May 2016 – 6 April 2018
- President: Michel Temer
- Preceded by: Ricardo Leyser
- Succeeded by: Leandro Cruz

Personal details
- Born: Leonardo Carneiro Monteiro Picciani; 6 November 1979 (age 46) Nilópolis, Rio de Janeiro, Brazil
- Party: MDB (2000–present)
- Spouse(s): Gisele Novaes (m. 2000; div. 2011) Janine Salles (m. 2012)
- Children: 3
- Parent: Jorge Picciani (father)
- Education: Candido Mendes University
- Occupation: Lawyer, agriculturalist

Leonardo Carneiro Monteiro Picciani (born 6 November 1979 in Nilópolis) is a Brazilian lawyer and politician affiliated to the Brazilian Democratic Movement (MDB), and former minister of Sports appoint by president Michel Temer. Is son of the former state deputy and former president of the Legislative Assembly of Rio de Janeiro, Jorge Picciani, and Rafael Picciani's brother.

Political offices
Preceded by Ricardo Leyser	Minister of Sports; 2016–2018	Succeeded by Leandro Cruz
