= Otoni de Paula Pai =

Brazilian pastor and politician (1953–2024)

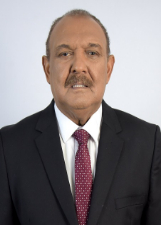
- Otoni de Paula Pai in 2022

Member of the Legislative Assembly of Rio de Janeiro
- In office 1 February 2023 – 27 May 2024
- Succeeded by: Rafael Picciani

Personal details
- Born: Otoni Moura de Paula; 3 January 1953 Magé, Rio de Janeiro, Brazil
- Died: 27 May 2024 (aged 71) Rio de Janeiro, Rio de Janeiro, Brazil
- Party: MDB
- Occupation: Pastor

Otoni Moura de Paula (3 January 1953 – 27 May 2024), best known as Otoni de Paula Pai or Otoni de Paula, Sr., was a Brazilian pastor and politician. A member of the Brazilian Democratic Movement (MDB), he served in the Legislative Assembly of Rio de Janeiro (Alerj) from 2023 to 2024.

De Paula died of liver cancer in Rio de Janeiro, on 27 May 2024, at the age of 71. He was father of the also politician Otoni de Paula.
