= Revelando =

- Genre: documentary
- Country of origin: Brazil
- Language: Brazilian Portuguese

Creative team
- Directed by: Alessandra Orofino

Cast and voices
- Starring: Samara Felippo; Fábio Porchat; Camila Pitanga; Luana Piovani; Juliette; Wagner Moura; MC Cabelinho; Alessandra Orofino

Production
- Length: approx. 30 minutes

Publication
- No. of seasons: 1
- No. of episodes: 9
- Original release: September 14 – October 24, 2026
- Provider: YouTube

Related
- Website: revelando.com

Revelando ("Unveiling" in Portuguese) is a Brazilian series of journalistic documentaries. The first season was shared on YouTube between September and October 2026. It is produced by Calma Urgente, with support from Instituto Conhecimento Liberta, Mídia Ninja, 342 Artes and Intercept Brasil.

On September 23, 2026 its second episode reached Top 1 on YouTube's "Hype" rank. On the same day, Meta Platforms took down the documentary profile, saying that it "doesn't follow platform standards", without, however, specifying which rule might have been violated. According to the documentary producers, it had already accumulated six million views. By the end of the day, Meta took back the page. Contacted by newspaper O Globo, a Meta representative said that "following an internal review, we have restored the account mentioned in the report. We apologize for the inconvenience."

== Episodes ==
=== Can poor women have children? Eugenics in Brazil ===
The first episode, titled "Can Poor Women Have Children? Eugenics in Brazil", ("Mulheres pobres podem ter filhos? Eugenia no Brasil") discusses the large number of female sterilization surgeries (tubal ligations) performed on women in Brazil throughout the 1970s, 1980s, and 1990s. There was a high incidence among poor, Black women—with many procedures carried out without consent—reaching a sterilization rate of 80% in states such as Maranhão. This issue was the subject of a Joint Parliamentary Inquiry Commission on the Mass Sterilization of Women, held at the Brazilian National Congress in 1992 and 1993. Hosted by actress Samara Felippo, the episode was released on September 14, 2026.

Regarding the project, in a statement sent to Folha de S.Paulo, Samara declared: "Motherhood should be a choice—neither an imposition nor a form of castration. This eugenic sterilization project was one of the cruelest things I have ever learned about. I fear that, even today, many women are still being deceived due to a lack of information."

=== Megachurches, Master Business ===
The second episode, titled "Megachurches, Master Business" ("Grandes Igrejas, Master Negócios"), addresses the link between the Lagoinha Church and the Banco Master scandal, detailing the connections that André Valadão, Flávio Bolsonaro, Nikolas Ferreira, and Viviane Barsi de Moraes (wife of Supreme Federal Court Justice Alexandre de Moraes) have with Daniel Vorcaro, Banco Master owner. It is hosted by actor Fábio Porchat and was made available on September 21, 2026.

After his Instagram profile was restored, Fábio Porchat posted a video in which he states: "The video was not a campaign, nor was it slander or racism; it was a list of facts—all of them widely reported by the press—explained in a way that is accessible to everyone. We highlighted the close ties that exist between figures such as Flávio Bolsonaro, Nikolas Ferreira, the Lagoinha Church, Daniel Vorcaro, and the Supreme Federal Court (STF). Following significant pressure, the page is back online, though we don’t know for how long."

=== The trial that never happened ===
Petition to the Superior Court of Justice (STJ) filed by Flávio Bolsonaro, acting in the defense of the military police officer accused of murdering Ana Clara

The third episode, titled "The Trial That Never Happened" ("O julgamento que nunca aconteceu"), covers the case of Ana Clara Machado, a five-year-old girl murdered outside her home by two rifle shots fired from the weapon of a military police officer, according to the charges brought by the Public Prosecutor's Office. Senator and lawyer Flávio Bolsonaro intervened on behalf of the officer, signing a petition to the Superior Court of Justice (STJ) aimed at delaying his trial by a jury.

The program explores the senator’s connection to other police officers who received honors—such as Adriano da Nóbrega—as well as to individuals murdered by police officers linked to him, such as Patricia Acioli and Marielle Franco. It was presented by actress Camila Pitanga, and released on September 30, 2026.

=== Who wants to steal your beach? ===
The fourth episode, titled "Who Wants to Steal Your Beach?" ("Quem quer roubar a sua praia?"), addresses the "Beach Constitutional Amendment Proposal" (PEC das Praias) — officially Constitutional Amendment Proposal No. 3 of 2022 — for which Senator Flávio Bolsonaro served as rapporteur. The proposal seeks to limit public access to beaches along the Brazilian coastline. It is presented by actress Luana Piovani and was released on October 7, 2026.

The program stems from the mobilization led by the actress in 2024, when she spoke out against a development project associated with the football player Neymar and raised concerns regarding the risk of beach privatization.

My mistake wasn’t fighting with him. It was fighting only with him.

— Luana Piovani, on

The actress also expresses concern that, should the constitutional amendment (PEC) be approved, beaches could be created that are inaccessible to Brazilians:

This project could change the beach you frequent, preventing you from reaching the sand or taking a dip in the sea—and stopping you from posting that perfect photo. It could even turn the beach into a place with a VIP area and a guest list at the entrance. Can you imagine that?

— Luana Piovani, on

The proposed constitutional amendment (PEC) primarily benefits hotels, clubs, and luxury condominium developments, as well as foreign business owners—individuals and companies that, by virtue of owning beachfront land, could prevent the public from reaching the sand.

— Luana Piovani, on

=== The War Against the Saint ===
On October 12, the feast day of Our Lady of Aparecida, patroness of Brazil, the fifth episode of the series—titled "The War Against the Saint" ("A Guerra à Santa") and hosted by the actress and singer Juliette was released. Posing the question, "Why does a saint stir up so much hatred in those who seek to rule the country?", the episode references the "kicking of the saint" incident. It also draws a connection between Bishop JB Carvalho—who labeled Our Lady of Aparecida the "right-hand woman of Satan" and called for her to be stripped of her status as the patron saint of Brazil—and Flávio Bolsonaro, who chose that same bishop’s church for his own baptism. Juliette further asks, "Among so many pastors, why surround oneself with someone who spreads hatred against people's faith?"

Flávio Bolsonaro commented on the Instagram post for the episode, accusing Juliette of spreading fake news and of using a saint for electoral purposes. Nikolas Ferreira also posted a video criticizing the content, labeling it as "desperation on the part of the left": "Between us—what kind of desperation is this from the left, using Juliette to sway votes toward the left and to appeal to Christians?" He went on to criticize the former Big Brother Brasil contestant, as well as the nature of the music associated with her: "Absolutely bottom-of-the-barrel stuff—this crowd that loves promiscuity, that loves a bit of pornographic music."

Juliette responded to the accusations on her Instagram, stating that she had been very respectful and asking people not to trust edited clips found online. "Watch the entire video. There isn’t a SINGLE comma in that video that hasn’t been verified—everything in it is true."

=== Submissive Homeland ===
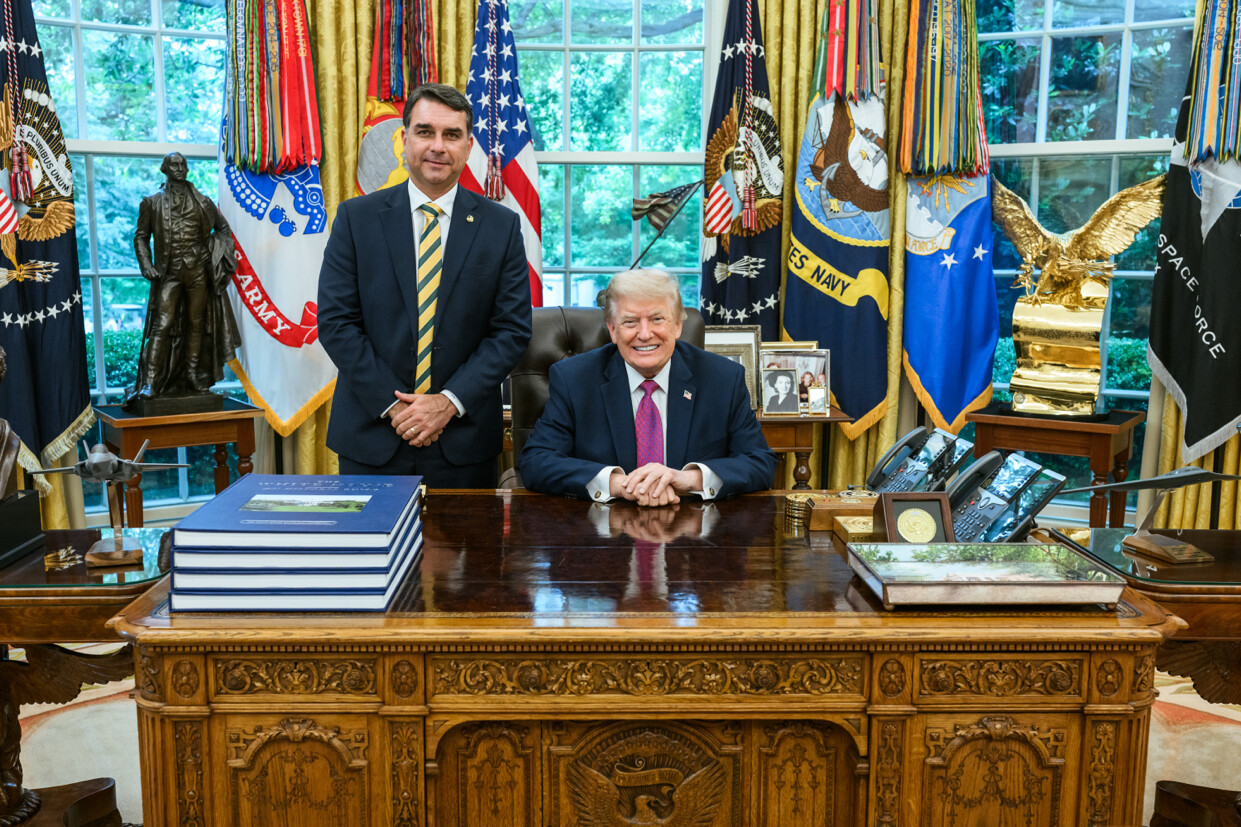
Donald Trump receives Flávio Bolsonaro in the Oval Office of the White House, in May 2026

On October 16, a new episode titled "Submissive Homeland" ("Pátria Submissa") aired, focusing on American interest in Brazil's rare-earth elements and a proposal by candidate Flávio Bolsonaro to hand them over to Trump. Hosted by Wagner Moura, the episode features an interview with retired Divisional General Santos Cruz—a former minister in the Jair Bolsonaro administration—who states, "This is not being patriotic; it is complete submission."

The interview with the general was made available in its entirety, in a video lasting about 40 minutes. In it, the general—among other criticisms—characterizes the photograph released by Donald Trump, showing him seated while Flávio Bolsonaro stands, as a "submissive posture."

Seeking external support, in the way it was done, is absurd—it is truly an attack on Brazil’s sovereignty; I have no doubt about that. It is voluntary submission. The United States also benefits from this "volunteering"—they didn’t even have to do any recruiting. A former Brazilian congressman—who traveled there while still holding office—went to negotiate sanctions against Brazil. Seeking such interference is treason. I’m not even sure if there is a specific legal provision for this.

I consider myself right-wing. But what we’re seeing now—this extremism—that isn’t "right-wing." That’s just fraud.General Santos Cruz, former minister under Jair Bolsonaro administration

—

=== Republic of Proxies ===
Connections between Flávio Bolsonaro, Willer Tomaz, Daniel Vorcaro, Kássio Nunes Marques, and "Bald Guy of INSS"

The seventh episode of Revelando, titled "Republic of Proxies" ("República dos Laranjas"), is hosted by Fábio Porchat and presents new developments regarding the allegation that lawyer Willer Tomaz de Souza acted as a "proxy" ("laranja") for Flávio Bolsonaro, as well as the connections between them and both Daniel Vorcaro and Supreme Court judge Nunes Marques. Willer is identified as the "financial, asset, and logistical hub" for money laundering in the National Social Security Institute (INSS) fraud scheme, with alleged connections to Antônio Carlos Camilo Antunes, known as the "Bald Guy of INSS" ("Careca do INSS").

The episode also mentions the case of Richarlison’s island, in which the player allegedly lost ownership of an island in Angra dos Reis, on the southern coast of Rio de Janeiro, to Willer Tomaz and Flávio Bolsonaro through a legal maneuver.

=== Daddy’s Little Flávio ===
The eighth episode of "Revelando," titled "Daddy’s Little Flávio" ("Flavinho de Papai"), is presented by MC Cabelinho and explores the professional life of Flávio Bolsonaro through the lens of meritocracy. The episode was released on YouTube on October 22, 2026.

The program covers his professional experience, beginning with his first role—a political appointment (cargo comissionado) as an aide to the Brazilian Progressive Party (PPB), now known as Progressistas, in Brasília. He held this position from December 2000 to June 2002, a period during which he was also attending daily in-person university classes and completing an internship twice a week in Rio de Janeiro—a situation suggesting he may have been a "ghost employee". According to his 2001 income tax return, his salary was R$ 4,712—equivalent to approximately R$ 13,500 when adjusted for inflation up to 2019, as calculated by BBC News Brasil—a position he reportedly secured through a recommendation from his father, an instance of nepotism.

Meta removed the content shortly after it was posted, citing a Superior Electoral Court (TSE) rule regarding the use of artificial intelligence in electoral content—though it failed to specify which part of the material allegedly violated the regulation. The content remains available on YouTube. The Lula campaign brought the matter to the TSE, filing a request for an investigation into the PL candidate—Senator Flávio Bolsonaro—and citing the incident as an example of abuse and unequal treatment by the platform during the election race. According to the campaign, there has been an abuse of economic power and the improper use of media channels, with digital platforms allegedly favoring the opposing ticket; they also pointed to restrictions on the reach of content favorable to Lula, as well as flaws in the distribution of electoral advertising. Justice Villas Bôas Cueva of the Superior Electoral Court (TSE) ordered Meta to conduct a human review of the content within 24 hours. The content was back online a few hours later.

The video received comments from supporters of Flávio Bolsonaro, including Pablo Marçal and Neymar—the latter commenting, "That said, 22." (Note: Bolsonaro's party number.)

=== A Familiar Pain ===
The final episode of the first season, "A Familiar Pain" ("Uma Dor Familiar") is presented by the program’s general director, Alessandra Orofino, and addresses the escalation of firearm proliferation during the Jair Bolsonaro administration—a trend that candidate Flávio Bolsonaro promises to continue. Alessandra demonstrates how the easing of access to weapons has served to supply organized crime and put women and children at risk. It was made available on YouTube on October 24, 2026.

Orofino also provides context regarding legislative bills linked to Flávio’s past voting record—for instance, a 2009 vote he cast while serving as a state deputy in the Legislative Assembly of Rio de Janeiro (Alerj). He was the sole member to vote against a bill—introduced by deputy Inês Pandeló of the Workers' Party (PT)—that sought to suspend the right to carry firearms for police officers who had committed acts of domestic violence. The bill was passed by the legislature and subsequently signed into law by then-governor Sérgio Cabral as Law No. 5402/2009.
