= TH Joias =

Brazilian jeweler and politician

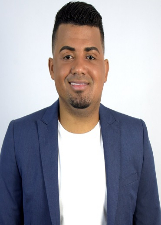
- TH Joias in 2022

Legislative Assembly of Rio de Janeiro
- Incumbent
- Assumed office July 5, 2024 – September 3, 2025
- Preceded by: Otoni de Paula Pai
- Succeeded by: Rafael Picciani

Personal details
- Born: Thiego Raimundo dos Santos Silva; December 27, 1988 (age 37) Rio de Janeiro, Rio de Janeiro, Brazil
- Party: MDB
- Occupation: Jewelry designer politician

Thiego Raimundo dos Santos Silva, better known as TH Joias, (December 27, 1988), is a Brazilian jeweler and politician. He was a state deputy for Rio de Janeiro between 2024 and 2025, after taking a seat as an alternate in Legislative Assembly of Rio de Janeiro (ALERJ).

== Biography ==
=== First years and career ===
Tiego was born in Morro do Fubá, in the northern part of Rio de Janeiro, in 1988, the son of goldsmith Juberto. After leaving school, he frequented his family's store in the Madureira neighborhood, where he learned the trade from his father. At the age of 19, he inherited the family business and began selling jewelry. TH also supported projects in the favelas and sponsored parties in the Honório Gurgel neighborhood. His client list includes athletes such as Neymar, Vinícius Júnior, and Adriano, as well as artists such as L7nnon, Ludmilla, Dennis DJ, and MC Poze do Rodo.

In his application form, validated by the Brazilian Election Justice, he stated that he had incomplete basic education.

=== Politics ===
Affiliated with the Brazilian Democratic Movement (MDB), he ran for elected office for the first time in 2022, as one of the party's candidates for state deputy of Rio de Janeiro. In the election, he received 15,105 votes, becoming an alternate. In 2024, with the death of Otoni de Paula Pai and Rafael Picciani's leave of absence to take over Cláudio Castro's (PL) State Secretariat of Sports and Leisure within the state government, Thiego took over the position of State Representative on July 5, 2024.

During his term, he chaired the Civil Defense Commission of Legislative Assembly of Rio de Janeiro (ALERJ), responsible for coordinating disaster prevention actions in the cities of Rio de Janeiro. He participated in public events with the Military Police of Rio de Janeiro State (PMERJ), such as the delivery of armored vehicles, alongside Governor Cláudio Castro, and sent letters to the PMERJ requesting police reinforcement in neighborhoods in the northern part of the city, in addition to participating in a public hearing on the use of drones by criminals.

On September 3, 2025, he was arrested for drug trafficking, corruption, and money laundering. Civil police investigations also indicate that Thiego allegedly negotiated arms deals with the Comando Vermelho (CV), a criminal organization founded in Rio de Janeiro. The Federal Police (PF) found the photos, including one of TH Joias in bed next to 5 million reais inside a house. Thiego had already been arrested on another occasion, when he was sentenced to 14 years, eleven months, and 22 days in prison by the Rio de Janeiro Court in 2022 for drug trafficking. He served almost ten months in prison between 2017 and 2018, and can only take office as a congressman thanks to a writ of habeas corpus that allows him to appeal the sentence while remaining free.

After his arrest, the MDB announced TH Joias' expulsion from the party. On September 8, 2025, the Federal Regional Court of the 2nd Region (TRF-2) voted to uphold Thiego's preventive detention. Claudio Castro dismissed Rafael Picciani from the position of Secretary of State, which led to Picciani returning to Alerj. As an alternate, Thiego lost his seat in the State Assembly.

==== Electoral performance ====
Year	Position	Party	Votes	Result	Ref.
2022	State deputy of Rio de Janeiro	Brazilian Democratic Movement	15 105	Alternate	
