= Douglas Ruas =

Brazilian politician (born 1989)

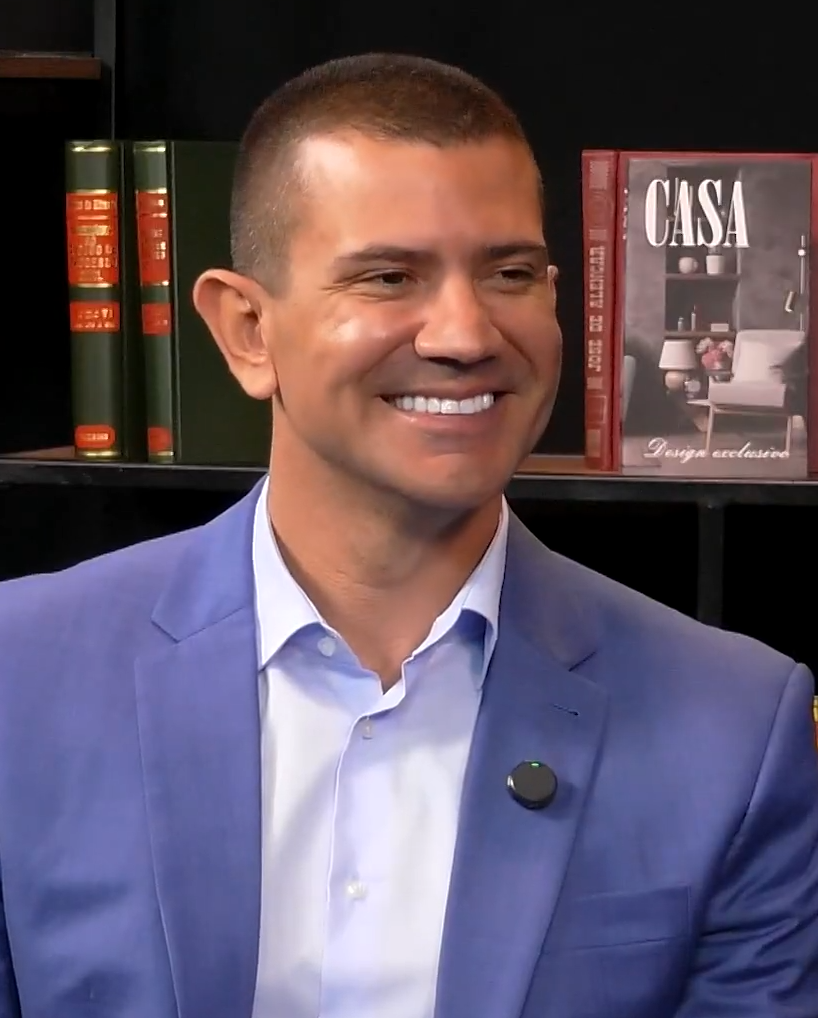
- Ruas in 2025

Governor-elect of Rio de Janeiro
- Assuming office 6 January 2027
- Lieutenant: Fernanda Louback (elect)
- Succeeding: Ricardo Couto (acting)

President of the Legislative Assembly of Rio de Janeiro
- Incumbent
- Assumed office 17 April 2026
- Preceded by: Guilherme Delaroli (acting)

State Deputy of Rio de Janeiro
- Incumbent
- Assumed office 1 February 2023 (Note: He took a leave of absence between 2023 and 2026 to serve in the cabinet of Cláudio Castro.)
- Constituency: At-large
Executive offices
Secretary of Cities of Rio de Janeiro
In office 27 September 2023 – 20 March 2026
Governor	Cláudio Castro
Preceded by	Uruan Andrade
Succeeded by	Maria Gabriela Bessa
Secretary of Integrated Management and Special Projects of São Gonçalo
In office 1 January 2021 – 3 April 2022
Mayor	Nelson Ruas
Preceded by	Office established
Succeeded by	Maria Gabriela Bessa

Personal details
- Born: 17 January 1989 (age 37) São Gonçalo, Rio de Janeiro, Brazil
- Party: PL (2021–present)
- Other political affiliations: Avante (2017–2021)
- Spouse: Mariana Barbosa (m. 2018)
- Children: 1
- Parent: Nelson Ruas (father)
- Education: Estácio de Sá University (LLB)

Douglas Ruas dos Santos (born 17 January 1989) is a Brazilian politician who has served as President of the Legislative Assembly of Rio de Janeiro since 2026. He also served as secretary of cities of Rio de Janeiro from 2023 to 2026 under Governor Cláudio Castro. In 2022, he was elected a member of the Legislative Assembly of Rio de Janeiro, as State Deputy starting on february, 2023. He is the son of Capitão Nelson, current mayor of São Gonçalo. He has a state carrer on the Civil Police of Rio de Janeiro, and has a law degree.

Ruas was the Liberal Party candidate in the Rio de Janeiro gubernatorial election. He defeated Eduardo Paes, the former mayor of Rio de Janeiro, in the first round, securing 50.8% of the vote. Ruas is currently under investigation by the Public Prosecutor's Office for embezzlement, money laundering, and criminal organization.

== Notes ==
Political offices
Preceded by Guilherme Delaroli (acting)	President of the Legislative Assembly of Rio de Janeiro; 2026–present	Incumbent
Preceded by Ricardo Couto (acting)	Governor of Rio de Janeiro; Taking office 2027	Elect
