= Carlos Portinho =

Brazilian politician and lawyer

Senator for Rio de Janeiro
- Incumbent
- Assumed office 3 November 2020
- Preceded by: Arolde de Oliveira

Personal details
- Born: Carlos Francisco Portinho; 2 July 1973 (age 53) Rio de Janeiro, Guanabara, Brazil
- Party: PL (2020–present)
- Other political affiliations: PSD (2011–2020)
- Profession: Lawyer

Carlos Francisco Portinho, also known as Portinho (born 2 July 1973), is a Brazilian politician and lawyer. In 2018, he was elected first substitute for senator in Rio de Janeiro.

Portinho took office in the Senate on 3 November 2020 as Senator for Rio de Janeiro, due to the passing of Arolde de Oliveira, at the age of 83, victim of COVID-19, who had organ failure caused by the disease.

In the public service, Portinho had served as Municipal Secretary of Housing during Eduardo Paes administration in Rio de Janeiro, State Secretary of Environment in the Luiz Fernando Pezão administration and Municipal Subsecretary of Housing in Marcelo Crivella administration.

In the private sector, as lawyer specialized in sports law, Portinho was juridical Vice President of Flamengo.

As a senator representing Rio de Janeiro, Portinho notably reported Bill 14193/2021 to the Senate, which eventually saw the creation of the Sociedade Anônima do Futebol public limited company model for football clubs.

Federal Senate
Preceded by Jorginho Mello	Senate PL Leader; 2021–2022	Succeeded by Flávio Bolsonaro
Vacant Title last held by Fernando Bezerra Coelho	Senate Government Leader; 2022–present	Incumbent
