= Marcelo Delaroli =

Brazilian politician (born 1980)

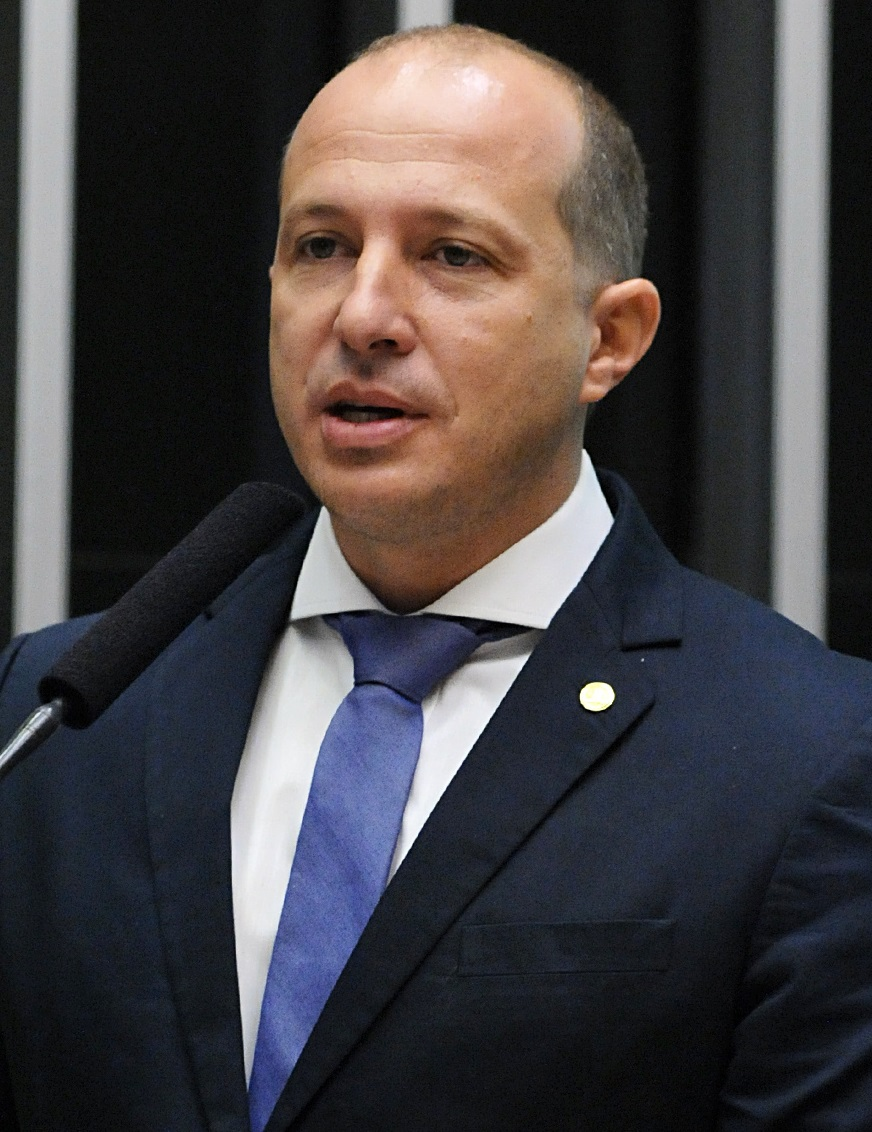
- Delaroli in 2017

Mayor of Itaboraí
- Incumbent
- Assumed office 1 January 2021
- Deputy: Lourival Casula (2021–25); Elber Corrêa (2025–)
- Preceded by: Sadinoel Souza

Member of the Chamber of Deputies
- In office 2 January 2017 – 1 February 2019
- Preceded by: João Ferreira Neto
- Constituency: Rio de Janeiro

Personal details
- Born: 10 July 1980 (age 46)
- Party: Liberal Party (since 2016)
- Relatives: Guilherme Delaroli (brother)

Marcelo Jandre Delaroli (born 10 July 1980) is a Brazilian politician serving as mayor of Itaboraí since 2021. From 2017 to 2019, he was a member of the Chamber of Deputies.
