= Carlos Jordy =

Brazilian politician (born 1982)

Senator-elect for Rio de Janeiro
- Assuming office 1 February 2027
- Succeeding: Flávio Bolsonaro

Member of the Chamber of Deputies
- Incumbent
- Assumed office 1 February 2019
- Constituency: Rio de Janeiro

Councillor of Niterói
- In office 1 January 2017 – 1 February 2019
- Constituency: At-large

Personal details
- Born: Carlos Roberto Jordy Coelho de Mattos; 8 February 1982 (age 44) Niterói, Rio de Janeiro, Brazil
- Party: PL (2022–present)
- Other political affiliations: PROS (2016); PSC (2016–18); PSL (2018–22); UNIÃO (2022)
- Website: www.carlosjordy.com.br

Carlos Roberto Jordy Coelho de Mattos (born 8 February 1982), or simply Carlos Jordy, is a Brazilian deputy for the state of Rio de Janeiro. He was elected in 2018.

Born in Niterói, he is affiliated to the Liberal Party (PL).

He is anti-communist and an ally of conservative former president Jair Bolsonaro.

Chamber of Deputies (Brazil)
Preceded by Wolney Queiroz	Chamber Opposition Leader; 2023–2024	Succeeded by Filipe Barros
