= Fernanda Louback =

Brazilian politician (born 1980)

- Louback in 2026

Vice Governor-elect of Rio de Janeiro
- Assuming office 6 January 2027
- Governor: Douglas Ruas (elect)
- Succeeding: Thiago Pampolha

Councillor of Niterói
- Incumbent
- Assumed office 1 January 2025

Personal details
- Born: Fernanda Anchieta Louback Michelini; 10 June 1980 (age 46) Niterói, Rio de Janeiro, Brazil
- Party: PL
- Children: 2

Fernanda Anchieta Louback Michelini (born 10 June 1980) is a Brazilian politician who was elected lieutenant governor of Rio de Janeiro in 2026. She has been a member of the municipal chamber of Niterói since 2025. She previously served as chairwoman of the women's wing of the Liberal Party in Niterói.

Political offices
Vacant Title last held by Thiago Pampolha	Vice Governor of Rio de Janeiro; Taking office 2027	Elect
