= Guilherme Delaroli =

Brazilian politician (born 1975)

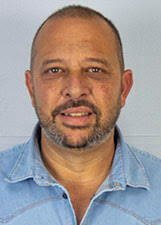
- Delaroli in 2022

Acting President of the Legislative Assembly of Rio de Janeiro
- In office 3 December 2025 – 17 April 2026
- Preceded by: Rodrigo Bacellar
- Succeeded by: Douglas Ruas

First Vice President of the Legislative Assembly of Rio de Janeiro
- Incumbent
- Assumed office 3 February 2023

Member of the Legislative Assembly of Rio de Janeiro
- Incumbent
- Assumed office 1 February 2023

Personal details
- Born: 1 December 1975 (age 50)
- Party: Liberal Party (since 2022)
- Relatives: Marcelo Delaroli (brother)

Guilherme Jandre Delaroli (born 1 December 1975) is a Brazilian politician serving as a member of the Legislative Assembly of Rio de Janeiro since 2023. He has served as the first vice president of the assembly since 2025.and is currently the acting President of ALERJ since 2025. He is the brother of Mayor Marcelo Delaroli.
