= Paracambi =

- Municipality
- The Municipality of Paracambi
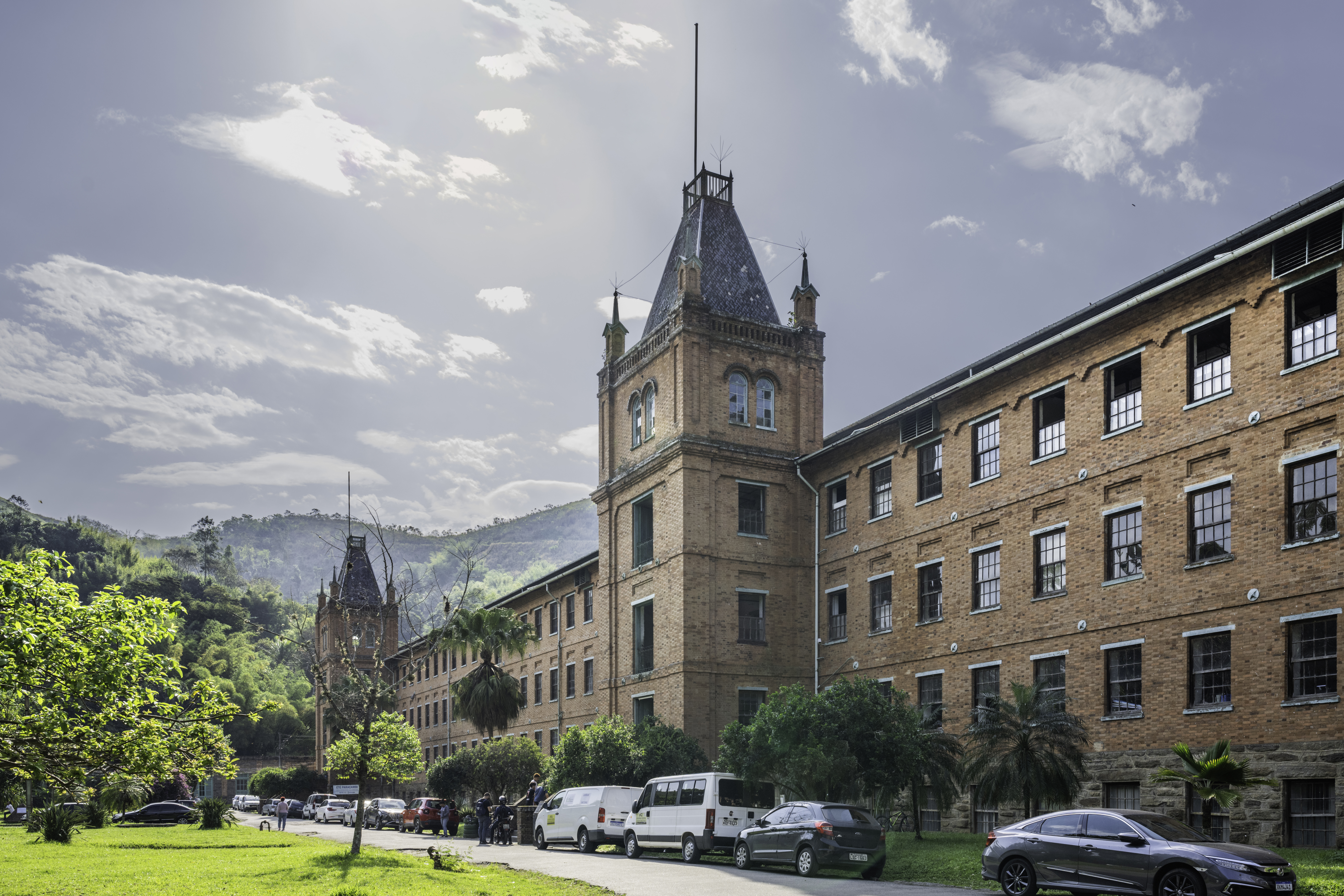
- A factory located in Paracambi.

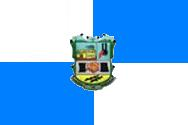
- Flag Coat of arms

- Location in Rio de Janeiro

- Location in Brazil
- Coordinates: 22°36′39″S 43°42′32″W
- Country: Brazil
- Region: Southeast
- State: Rio de Janeiro
- Founded: 1960

Government
  - Mayor: Lucimar (PL)

Area
  - Total: 179,374 km^{2} (69,257 sq mi)
- Elevation: 50 m (160 ft)

Population (2020)
  - Total: 52,683
  - Demonym: Paracambiense
  - Summer (DST): UTC−3 (BRT)

Paracambi (Portuguese pronunciation: [paɾakɐ̃ˈbi]) is a municipality located in the Brazilian state of Rio de Janeiro. Its population was 52,683 (2020) and its area is 179 km^{2}.

== Notable births ==
- Maicon Santos, professional football player
- Karin Hils, actress, singer-songwriter
