= Jorge Picciani =

Brazilian politician (1955–2021)

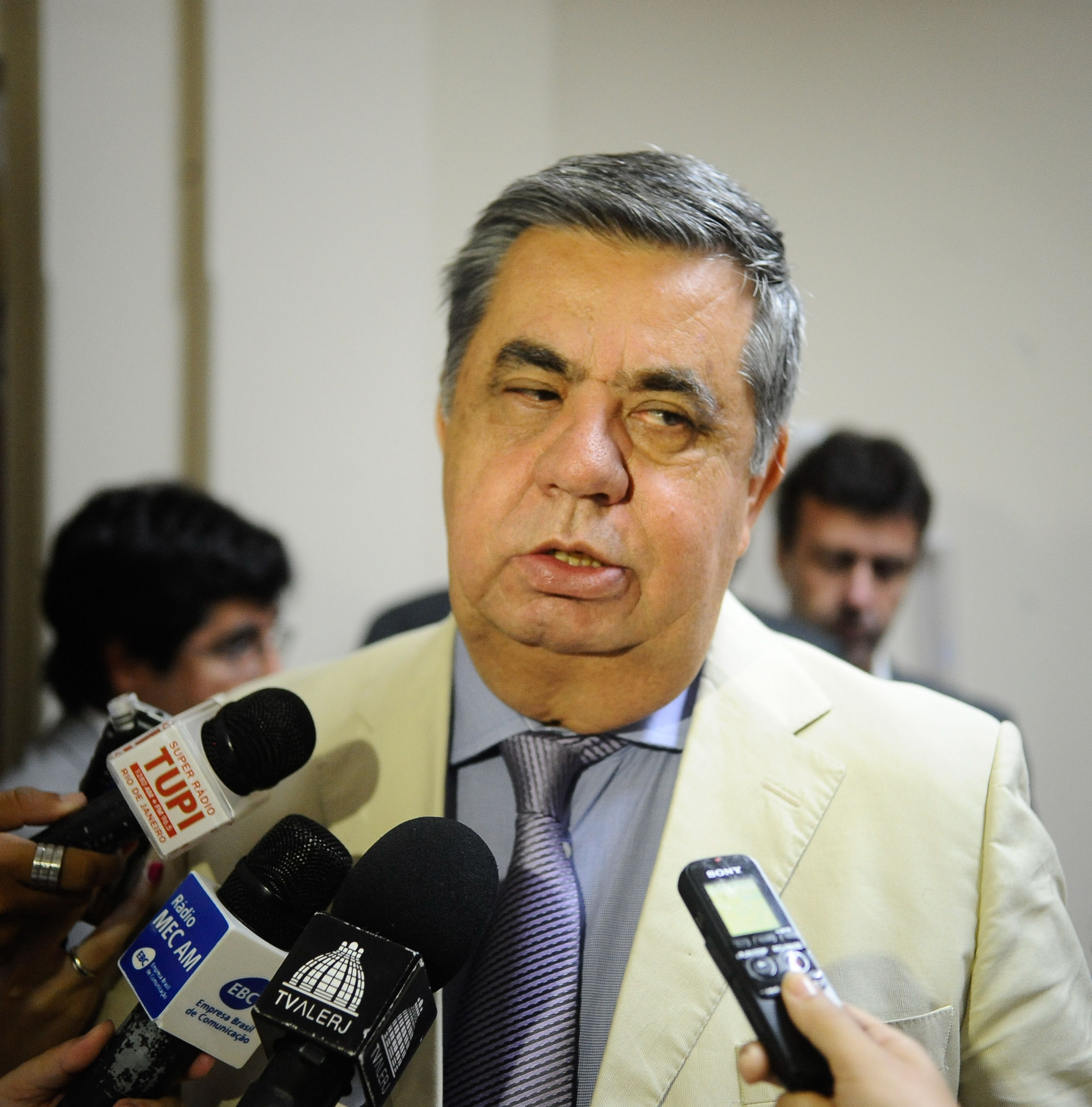
Jorge Picciani

Jorge Sayed Picciani (March 25, 1955 – May 14, 2021) was a Brazilian cattle rancher and politician, affiliated with the Brazilian Democratic Movement (MDB). He was preventively arrested at the José Frederico Marques Public Prison, in Benfica, where he was later released by the Federal Supreme Court for house arrest.

Having passed through the Democratic Labor Party (PDT), and affiliated with the Brazilian Democratic Movement (MDB) since 1995, he was president of the Legislative Assembly of state of Rio de Janeiro (Alerj) from 2003 to 2010, when he left office to run for the Senate. Before that, he was, for six years, first secretary of Alerj, in the period when the now ex-governor Sérgio Cabral Filho presided over the house (1995–2002). In the Leonel Brizola government, he was Secretary of Sports and President of the Superintendence of Sports of the State of Rio de Janeiro (SUDERJ).

Jorge Picciani was born in Rio de Janeiro on 25 March 1955. He was married and father of 5 sons, including politician Leonardo Picciani. He died on 14 May 2021 of prostate and bladder cancer in São Paulo.
