= Guanabara Palace =

- Palácio Guanabara
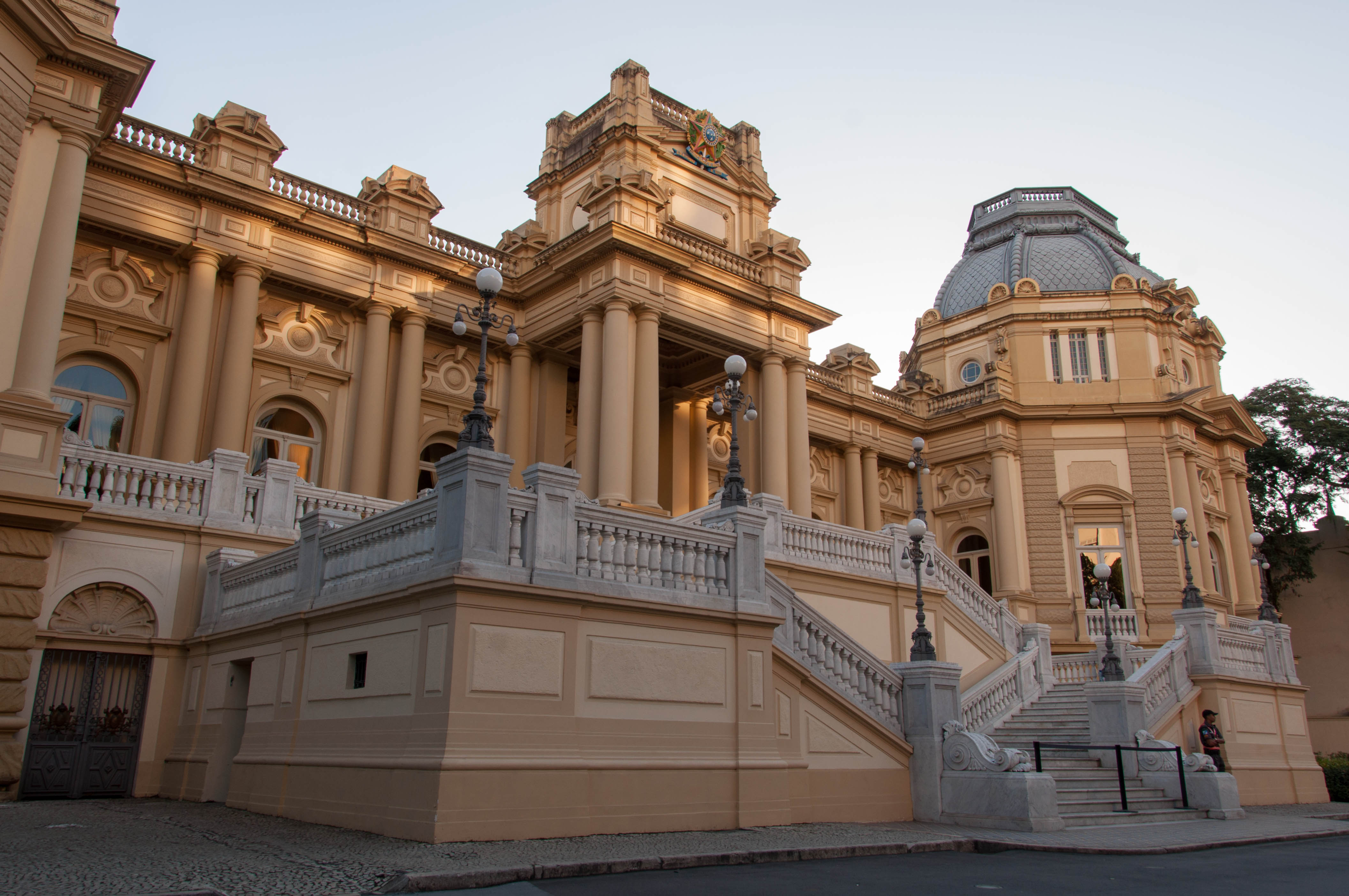

- Location within Rio de Janeiro
- Former names: Paço Isabel

General information
- Status: Seat of government
- Architectural style: Eclecticism
- Location: Rio de Janeiro, Rua Pinheiro Machado, Brazil
- Coordinates: 22°56′15″S 43°11′02″W
- Construction started: 1853
- Renovated: 1865; 1908; 1920; 2012
- Client: José Machado Coelho
- Owner: Rio de Janeiro state government

Website
- palaciosdopovo.rj.gov.br

The Guanabara Palace (Portuguese: Palácio Guanabara, formerly known as Paço Isabel) is the official seat of the government of Rio de Janeiro state. It is located on Pinheiro Machado Street (formerly Guanabara Street), in the Laranjeiras neighborhood (bairro), in the south zone of Rio de Janeiro, capital of the homonymous state. The Guanabara Palace should not be confused with Laranjeiras Palace, located in the same neighborhood (at Paulo Cesar Andrade Street, 407), which is the official residence of the Governor of the State of Rio de Janeiro.

== History ==
Originally built with neoclassical characteristics, its construction was started by Portuguese José Machado Coelho in 1853, having been used as a private residence until the 1860s. It was bought by the Brazilian imperial family in 1864 and then renovated by architect José Maria Jacinto Rebelo, becoming the residence of Princess Isabel and her husband, the Count of Eu, being then known as Paço Isabel. The building belonged to the princes until the proclamation of the Republic, in 1889, when it was confiscated by the republican military government and transferred to the Union, gaining its current name.

In 1908, a new renovation, led by Francisco Marcelino de Souza Aguiar, gave the façade of the palace eclectic features. It was reformed again in 1920 for the occasion of the visit of King Albert of Belgium and his wife Elisabeth.

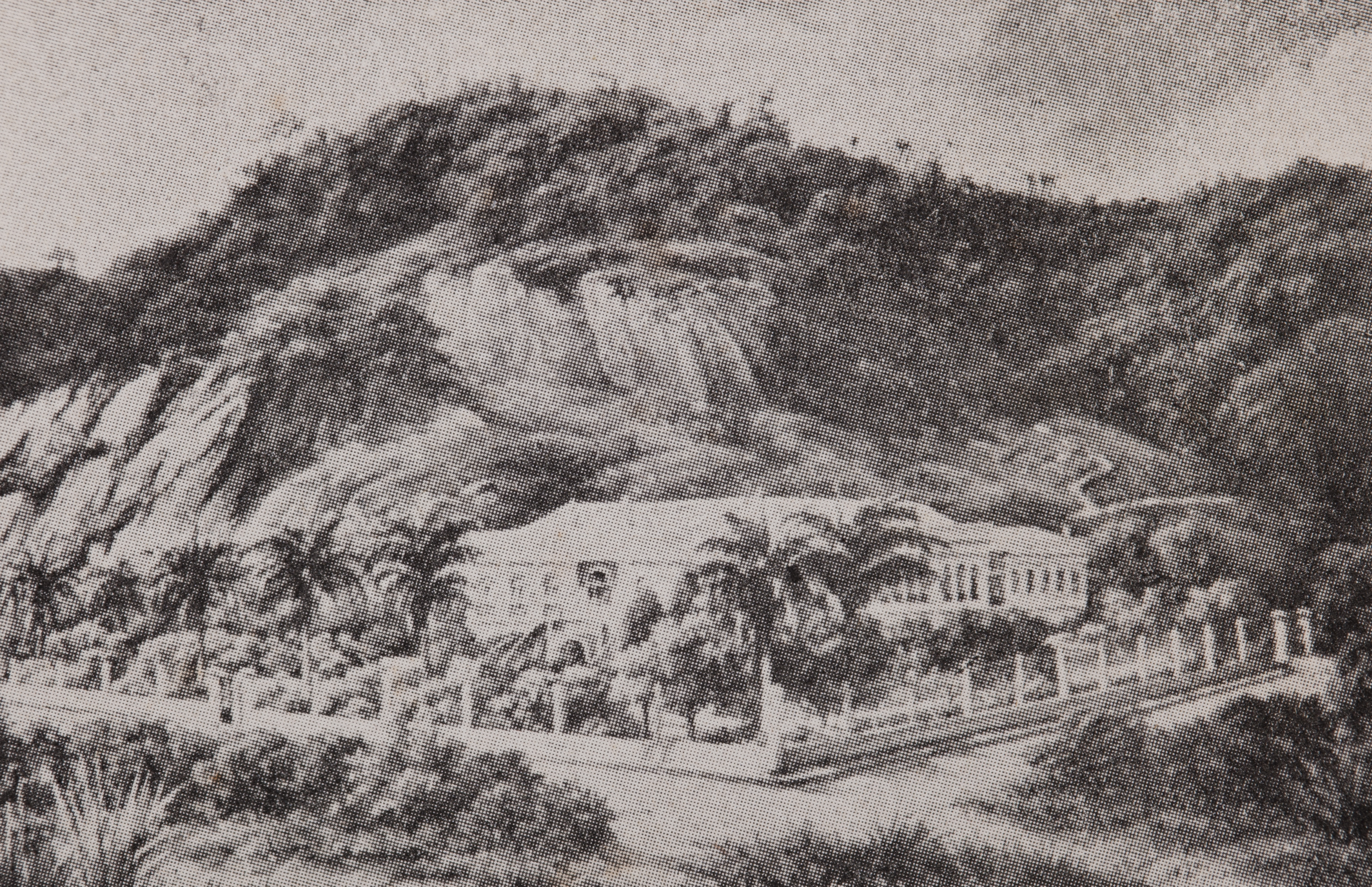
Paço Isabel in 1870

The palace was used as official residence by various presidents of Brazil, including president Getúlio Vargas during the Estado Novo (1937–1945). It was attacked during the putsch carried out by the Brazilian Integralist Action in 1938; the attackers were repelled by the Special Police (a division of the Civil Police of the Federal District), a reaction later reinforced by the Army.

In 1946, the Guanabara Palace became the seat of the Federal District's City Hall, ceasing to be the official residence of the presidency, until 1960, when president Juscelino Kubitschek transferred Brazil's capital to Brasília. In 1960, when the city of Rio de Janeiro ceased to be the capital of Brazil, the territory of the former Federal District became the state of Guanabara, at that moment, the palace became the seat of the Government of the State of Guanabara, a role it would maintain after the merger of the State of Guanabara with the State of Rio de Janeiro, in 1975, during the government of president Ernesto Geisel. At the same time, the Guanabara Palace was donated by the Union to the State of Rio de Janeiro and the Ingá Palace, in Niterói, ceased to host the state government.

== Brazilian Imperial Family v. Union ==
In December 1889, when the palace was confiscated by the military government and transferred to the Union, decree 78-A formally banished the imperial family and forced Emperor Pedro II to liquidate his assets in Brazilian territory within two years. A new decree of the then-provisional government, in 1890, determined that the imperial family's assets were incorporated into the Union.

A third decree in the following year, already under the 1891 Republican Constitution, again determined the transfer of possession of the palace to the Union, but a court decision at the time in favor of the legal representative of the imperial family in Brazil stopped the execution of the order of president Deodoro da Fonseca. The basic argument was that, as much as the Imperial Family had lost its political rights and privileges, the "political revolution" of 1889, consolidated with the Constitution of 1891, did not affect the private property rights of the former dynasty. Thus, until 1894 the Imperial Family's possession of the palace was not disturbed.

In 1894, the palace was confiscated by military forces and incorporated into the Union's assets. The following year, princess Isabel and her husband filed a lawsuit for possession of the palace. In the process, princess Isabel's successors asked for the restitution of the Guanabara Palace and recognition of ownership of the property, so that the palace could be considered part of the Royal Family's estate.

In 1955, Isabel's eight grandchildren filed a new lawsuit, this time claiming ownership of the palace — which made this one differ from the first, since the original was a repossession lawsuit.

In 1967, the first case was considered time-barred by Brazilian courts due to prescription, but the heirs appealed the decision.

In 1969, the two cases were in the former Regional Federal Court of Rio de Janeiro. They go hand in hand through the intricate mesh of the courts. And that started a new discussion about whether or not the lawsuits were time-barred. Nine years later, the court was abolished by the 1988 Constitution.

On 6 December 2018, between decisions and appeals of the lawsuit filed in 1895, brought by Princess Isabel, the Superior Court of Justice judged the oldest case appeal in progress in the country. In the decision, the court decided that the Guanabara Palace belonged to the Union, and not to the imperial family. The case was closed by the Supreme Federal Court on 28 August 2020, after 125 years, in favor of the Union.

== Gallery ==
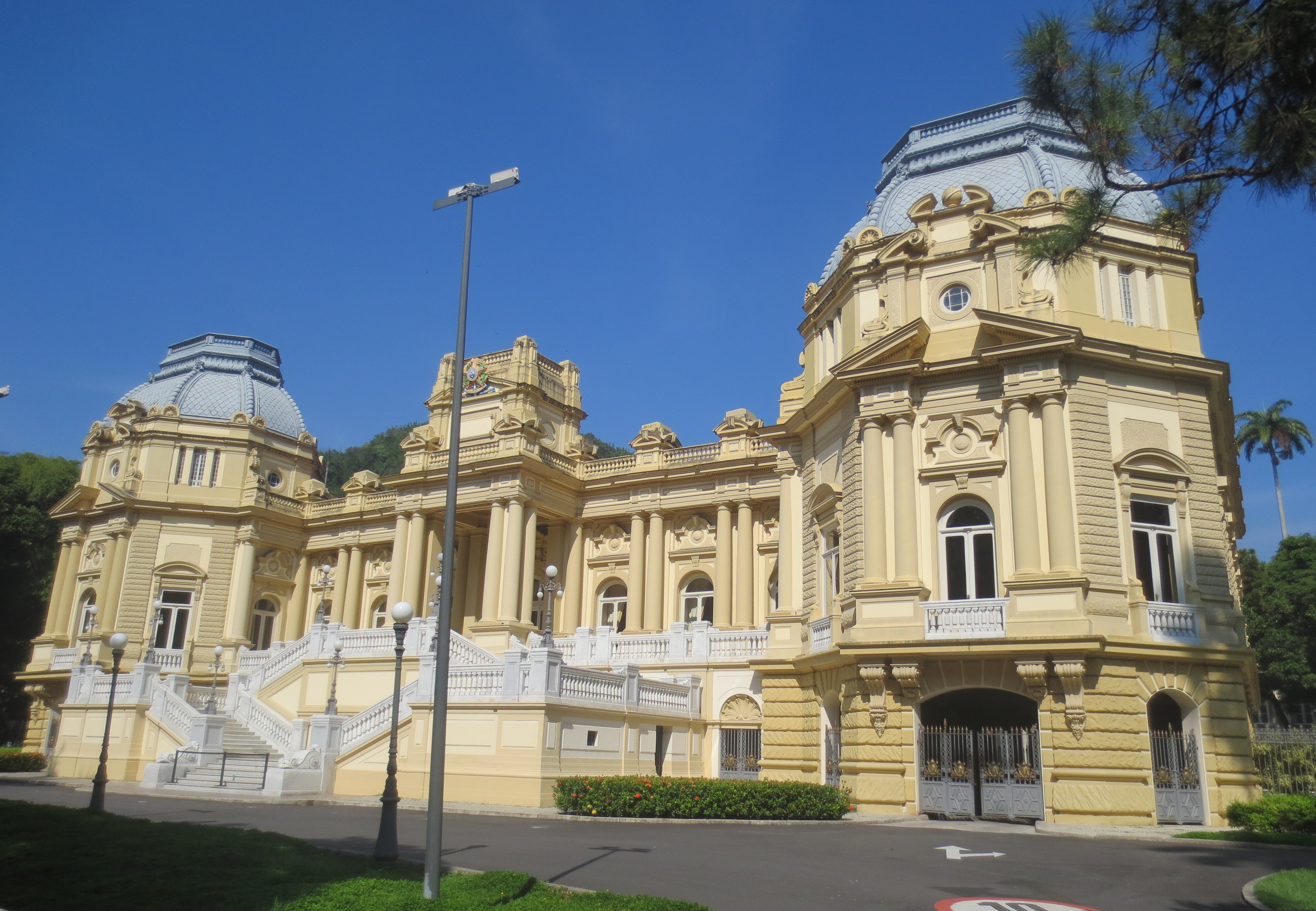
Façade

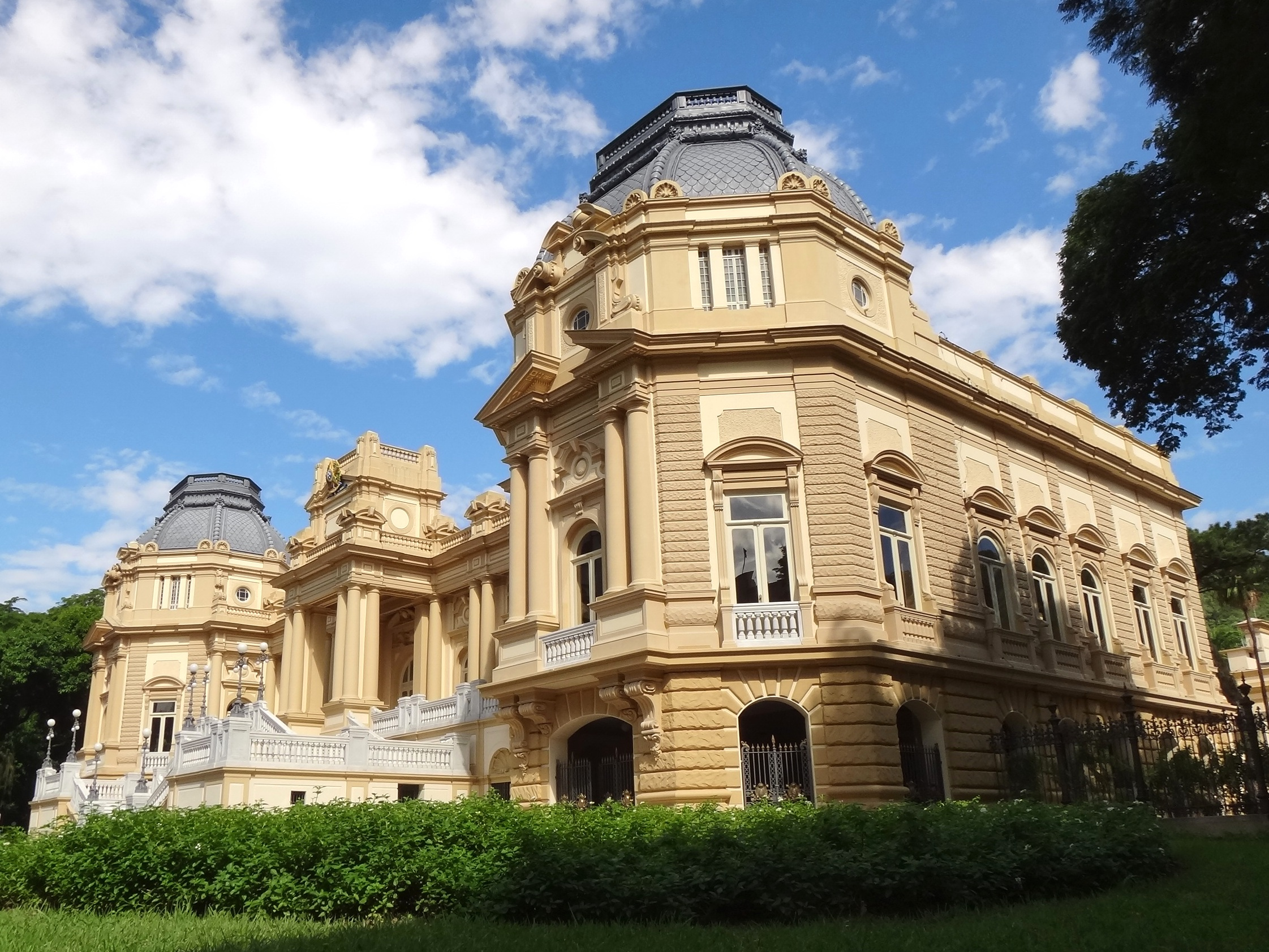

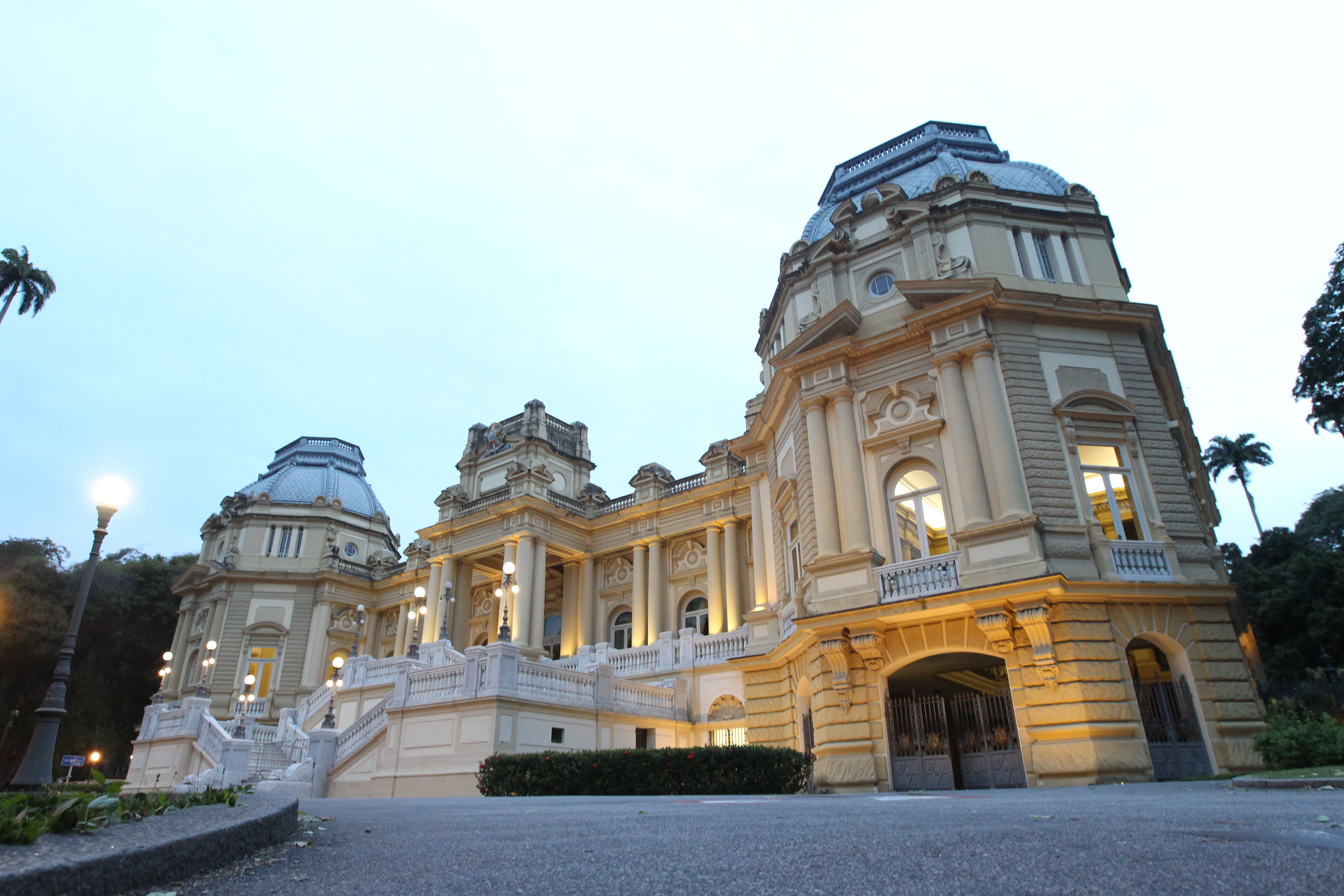

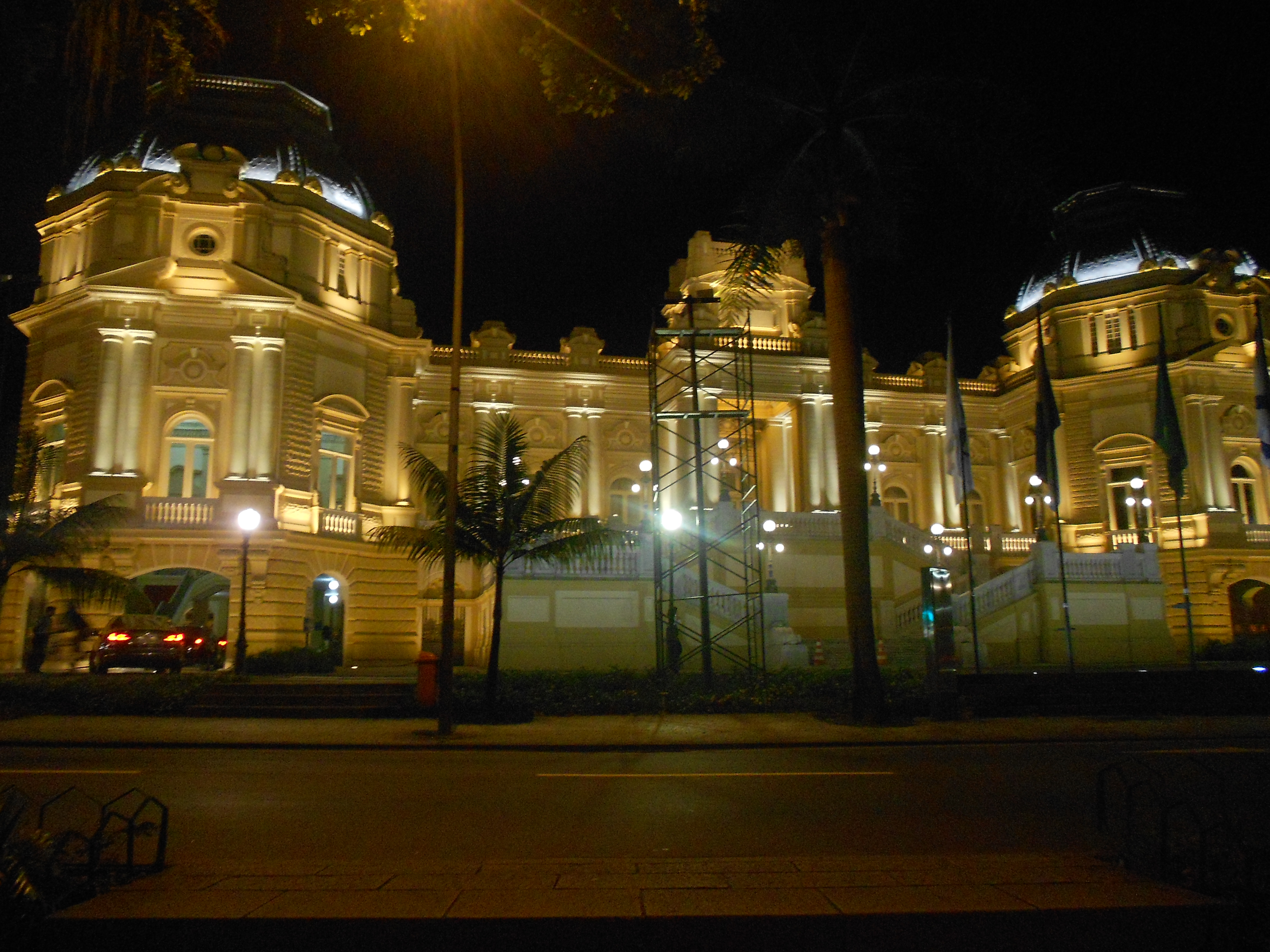
At night

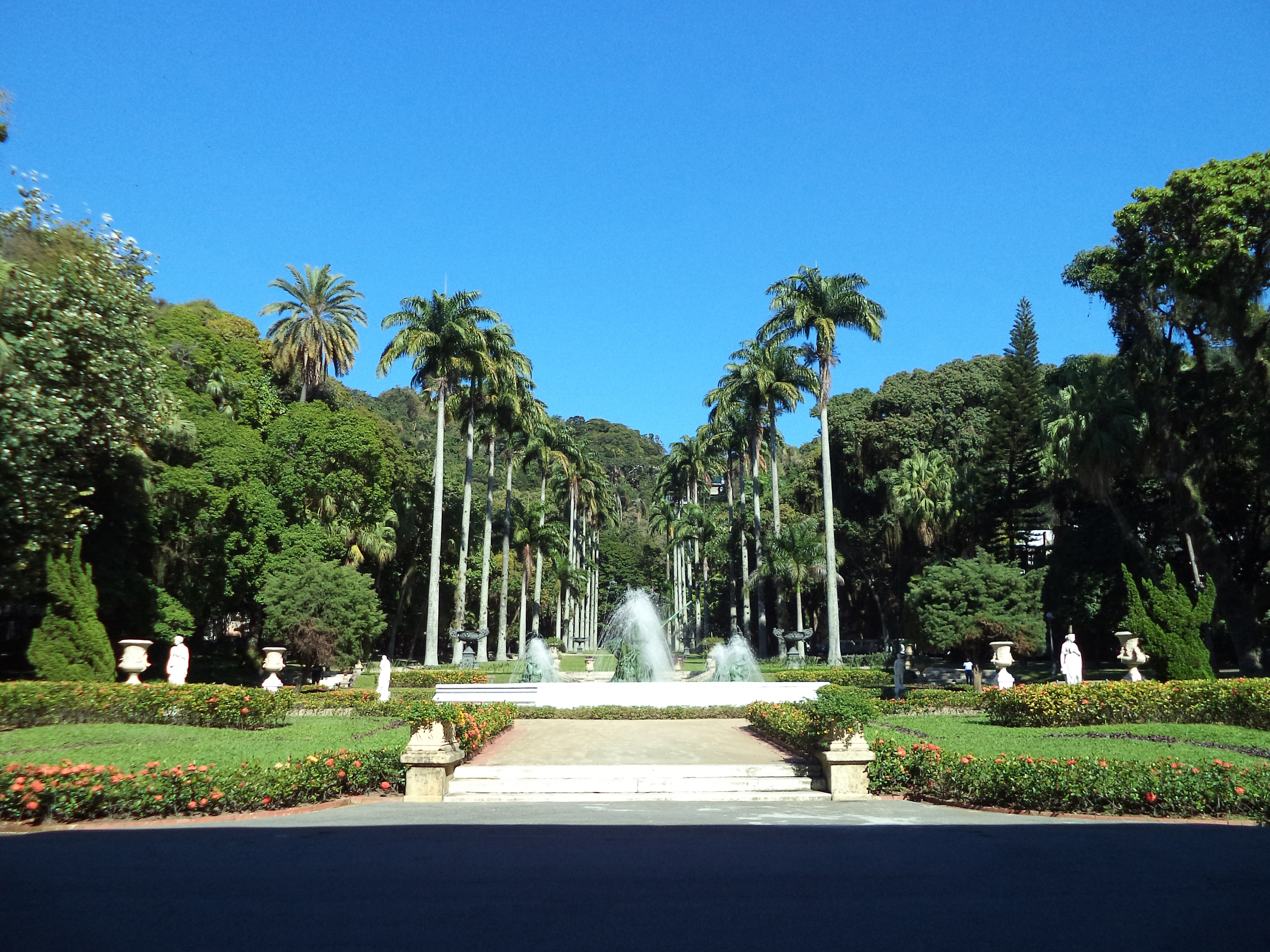
The symmetrical gardens designed by Paul Villon

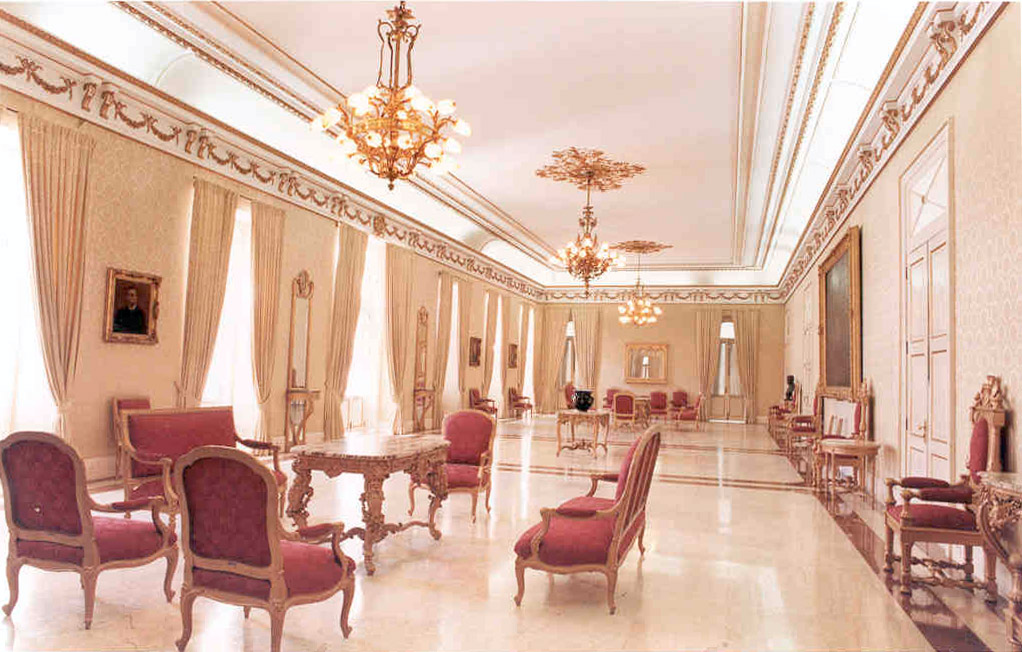
Interior
