= Legislative Assembly of Rio de Janeiro =

Legislative assembly in Brazil

Coordinates: 22°54′14″S 43°10′26″W

Legislative Assembly of Rio de Janeiro Assembleia Legislativa do Rio de Janeiro
- 13th Legislature of the Legislative Assembly

Type
- Type: Unicameral
- Term limits: None

History
- Founded: March 1975
- New session started: 1 February 2023

Leadership
- President: Douglas Ruas, PL since 17 April 2026
- Government Leader: Rodrigo Amorim, PL

Structure
- Seats: 70
- Political groups: Government (48) PL (17) UNIÃO (8) PSD (6) PP (5) Republicanos (3) PODE (3) MDB (2) PRD (2) PMN (1) Agir (1) Opposition (17) FE Brasil (8) PSOL (5) PSB (2) PDT (2) Independent (5) Solidariedade (4) AVANTE (1)
- Length of term: 4 years

Elections
- Voting system: Open list proportional representation
- Last election: 4 October 2026
- Next election: 2030

Meeting place
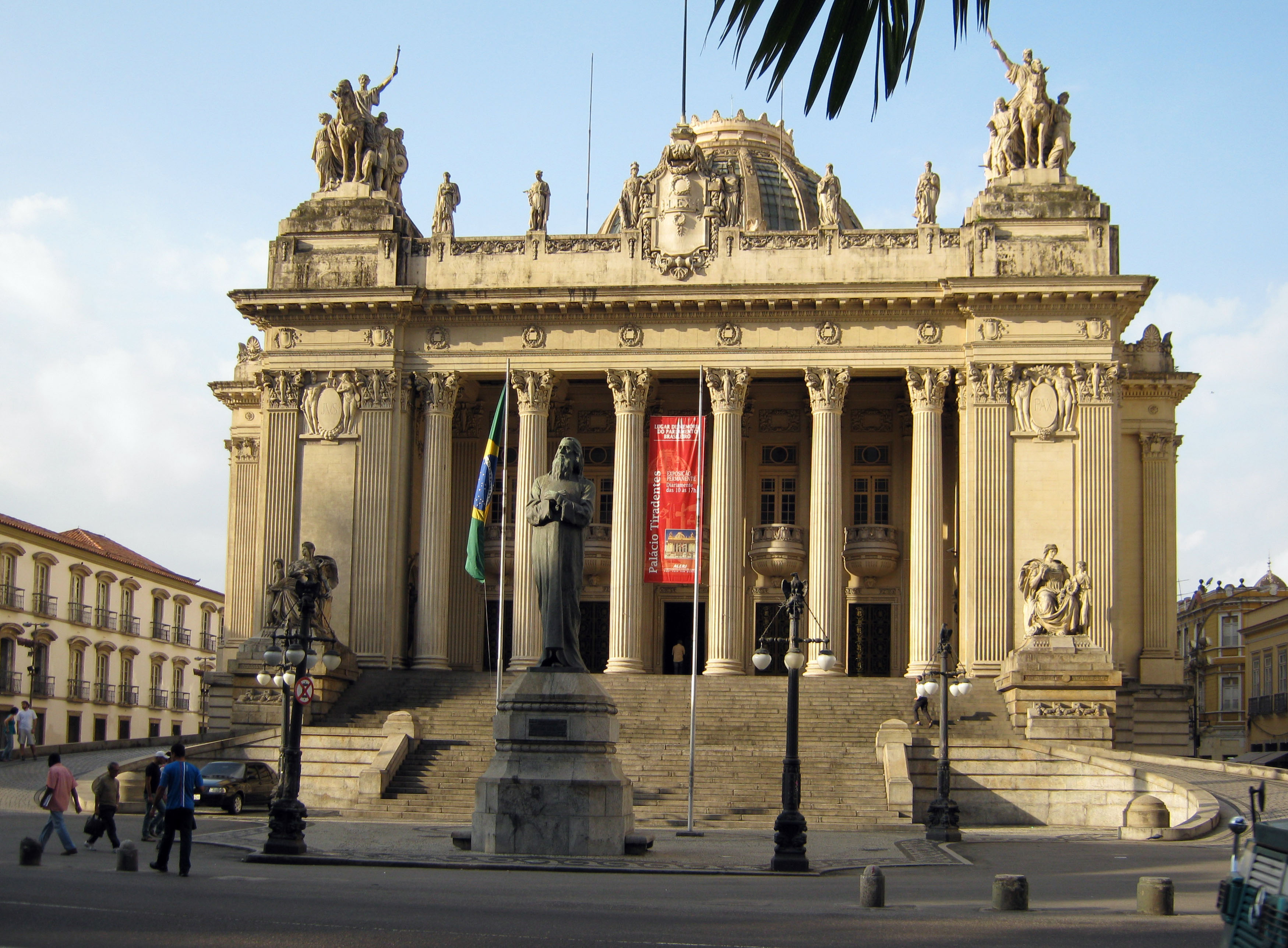
- Tiradentes Palace, Rio de Janeiro

Website
- www.alerj.rj.gov.br

The Legislative Assembly of Rio de Janeiro (Portuguese: Assembleia Legislativa do Estado do Rio de Janeiro or ALERJ) is the unicameral legislature of the state of Rio de Janeiro in Brazil. It has 70 state deputies elected by proportional representation.

After the 1834 Additional Act, the Provincial Assembly was founded in the city of Vila Real de Praia Grande (now Niterói), after the unification of the states of Guanabara and Rio de Janeiro on March 15, 1975 the assembly was moved to the Tiradentes Palace in the city of Rio de Janeiro (site of the Chamber of Deputies of Brazil until 1960).
