= 2022 Rio de Janeiro general election =

Brazilian state election

2022 Rio de Janeiro state election
- 2 October 2022
- Opinion polls
- Turnout: 77.24%
- Gubernatorial election
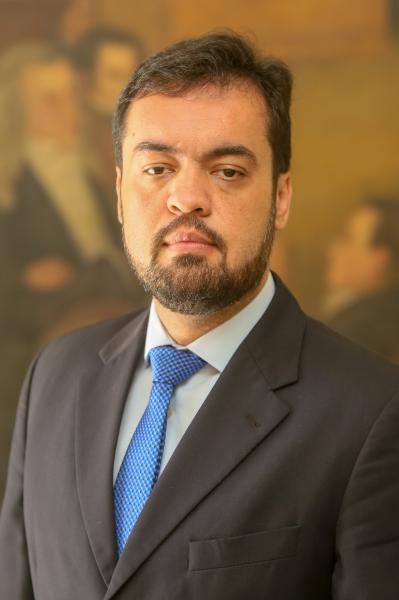

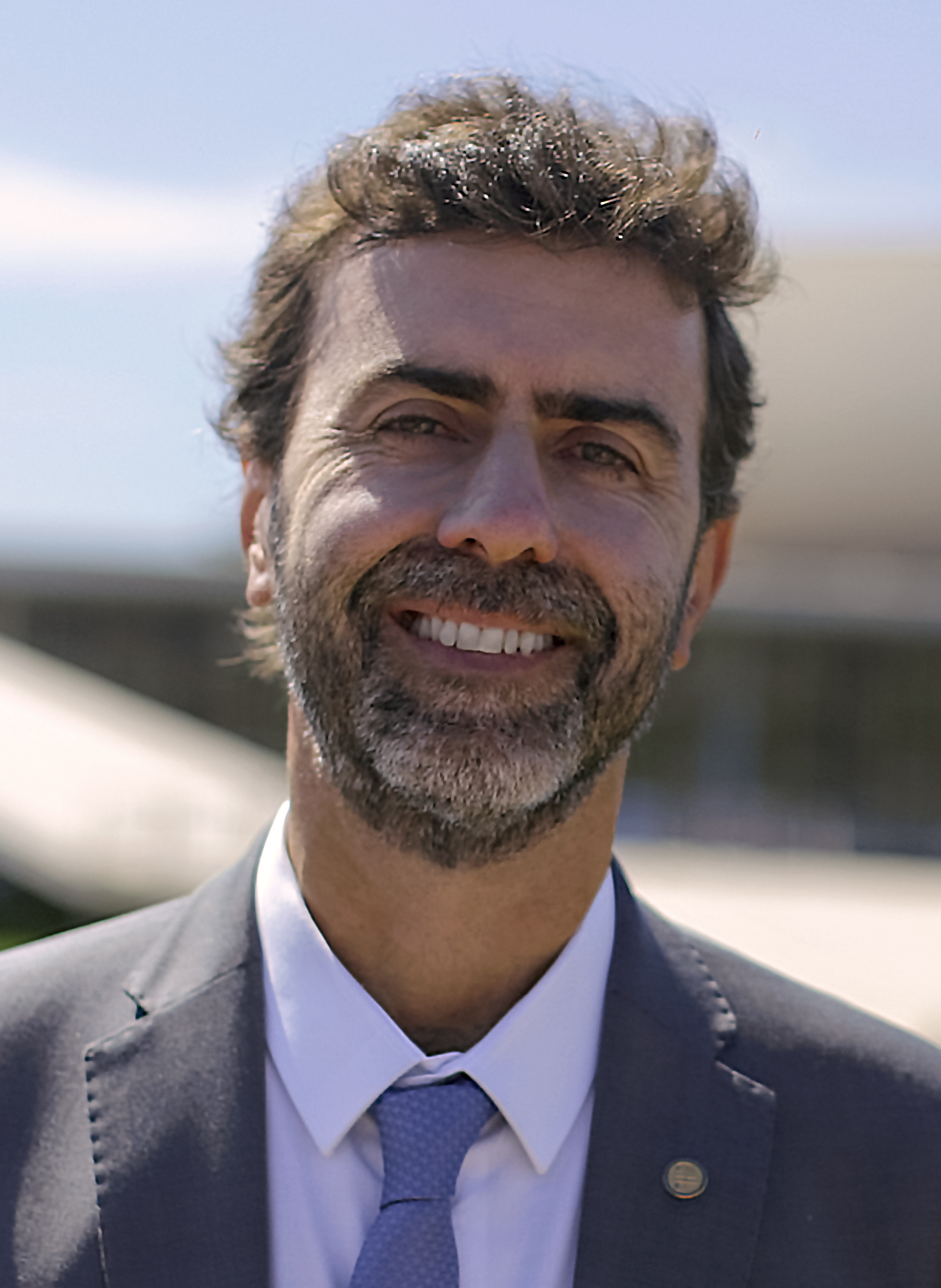

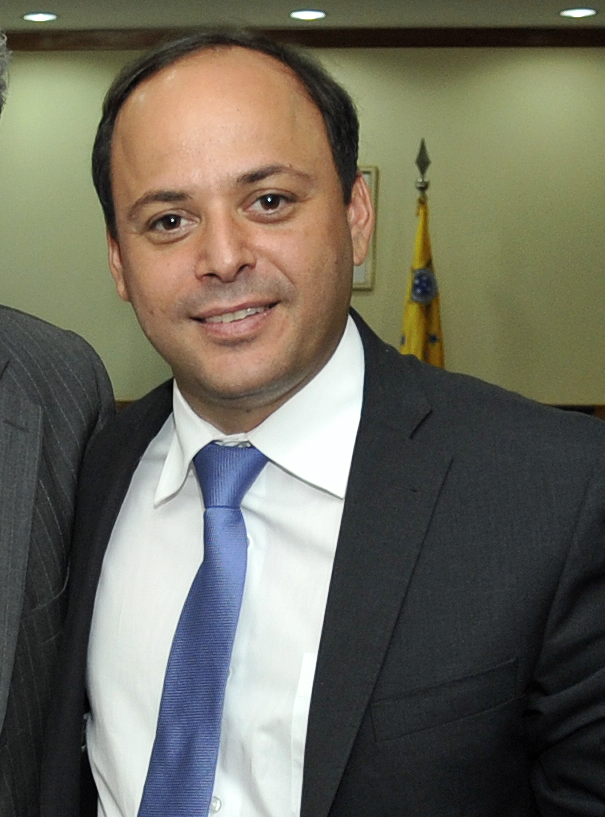
Candidate	Cláudio Castro	Marcelo Freixo	Rodrigo Neves
Party	PL	PSB	PDT
Alliance	Rio United and Stronger	Life Will Get Better	Changing With Who Governs
Running mate	Thiago Pampolha	César Maia	Felipe Santa Cruz
Popular vote	4,930,288	2,294,196	669,812
Percentage	58.69%	27.39%	8.00%
- Cláudio Castro Rodrigo Neves
Governor before election
Cláudio Castro
PL
Elected Governor
Cláudio Castro
PL
- Legislative election
- All 70 seats of the Legislative Assembly
Party	Leader	Seats	+/–
Legislative Assembly
PL	Filippe Poubel	17	+4
UNIÃO	Charlles Batista	8	−3
PT	Zeidan	7	+5
PSD	Luiz Paulo	6	+1
PSOL	Renata Souza	5	+1
PP	Dionisio Lins	4	+1
Solidarity	None	3	−3
Republicanos	Carlos Macedo	3	0
PODE	Alexandre Freitas	2	0
MDB	Rosenverg Reis	2	+1
PDT	Martha Rocha	2	+1
PROS	None	2	0
PSB	Carlos Minc	2	−1
PTB	Marcus Vinícius	1	−2
Patriota	Val Ceasa	1	0
Agir	None	1	+1
PSC	None	1	−2
MOBILIZA	None	1	+1
PCdoB	Enfermeira Rejane	1	0
Avante	Marcos Abrahão	1	−2
This lists parties that won seats. See the complete results below.
- Senatorial election
- 2 October 2022 (one-only round)
- Opinion polls
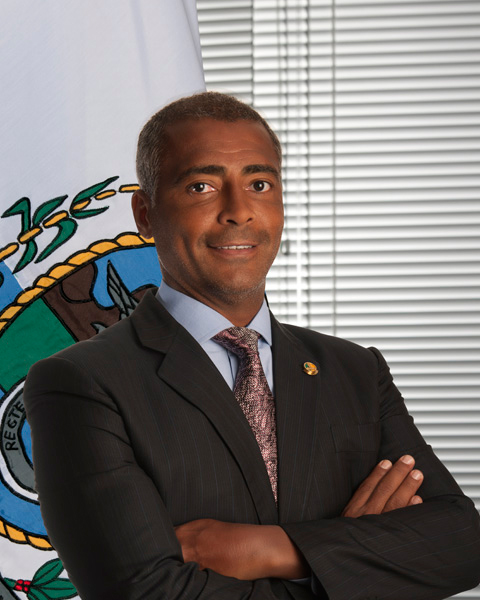

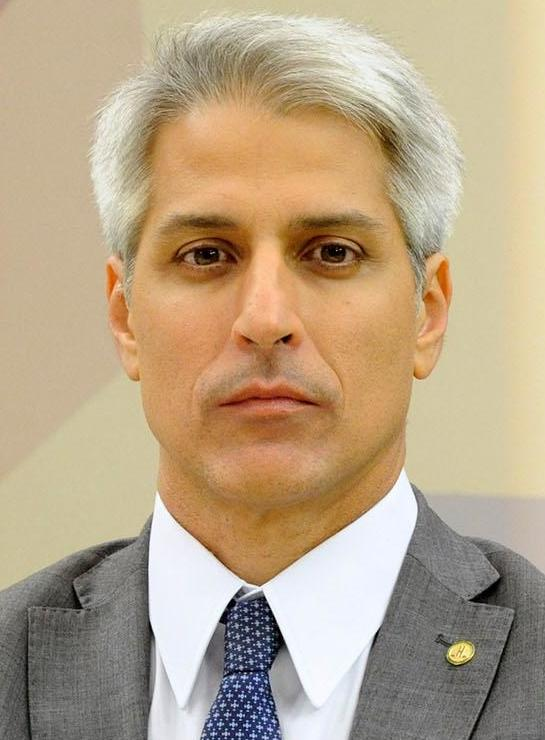

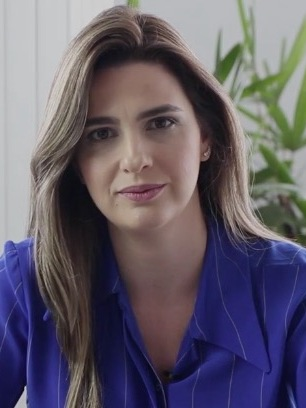
Candidate	Romário Faria	Alessandro Molon	Clarissa Garotinho
Party	PL	PSB	UNIÃO
Popular vote	2,384,331	1,731,786	1,145,413
Percentage	29.17%	26.26%	17.37%
- Romário Faria André Ceciliano; Clarissa Garotinho Alessandro Molon
Senator before election
Romário Faria
PL
Elected Senator
Romário Faria
PL

The 2022 Rio de Janeiro state election took place in the state of Rio de Janeiro, Brazil on 2 October 2022. Voters elected a governor, vice governor, one senator, two alternate senator, 46 representatives for the Chamber of Deputies, and 70 Legislative Assembly members, with a possible second round to be held on 30 October 2022. Under the Constitution of Brazil, the governor would be elected for a four-year term starting 1 January 2023, which, with the approval of Constitutional Amendment No. 111, will end on 6 January 2027.

The incumbent governor, Cláudio Castro, a member of the Liberal Party, was eligible for a second term, and intended to run for reelection. He was the vice governor of Rio de Janeiro until Wilson Witzel was convicted and removed from office on 30 April 2021 as a result of his impeachment trial. Castro beat his opponent Marcelo Freixo in the first round.

For the election to the Federal Senate, the seat occupied by Romário (PL), elected in 2014 by the Brazilian Socialist Party (PSB), was in dispute. Romário won reelection against a disparate field of candidates including Alessandro Molon, Clarissa Garotinho, and Daniel Silveira, whose candidacy was disqualified after the election.

== Electoral calendar ==
Note: This section only presents the main dates of the 2022 electoral calendar; check the TSE official website (in Portuguese) and other official sources for detailed information.

Electoral calendar
15 May	Start of crowdfunding of candidates
20 July to 5 August	Party conventions for choosing candidates and coalitions
16 August to 30 September	Period of exhibition of free electoral propaganda on radio, television and on the internet related to the first round
2 October	First round of 2022 elections
7 October to 28 October	Period of exhibition of free electoral propaganda on radio, television and on the internet related to a possible second round
30 October	Possible second round of 2022 elections
until 19 December	Delivery of electoral diplomas for those who were elected in the 2022 elections by the Brazilian Election Justice

== Legislative Assembly ==
The following table shows the result of the 2018 election and the composition of the Legislative Assembly as of 4 April 2022:

Party	Votes	%	Seats		
Party	Votes	%	Seats won in the 2018 election	Seats held on 4 April 2022	+/−
Social Liberal Party (Note: The Democrats and Social Liberal Party merged in February 2022 to form the Brazil Union.)	1,204,808	15.62	13	N/A	▼13
Democrats	546,433	7.09	6	N/A	▼6
Brazilian Democratic Movement	515,469	6.68	5	1	▼4
Socialism and Liberty Party	489,151	6.34	5	4	▼1
Social Democratic Party	361,440	4.69	3	5	▲2
Democratic Labour Party	349,499	4.53	3	1	▼2
Workers' Party	349,202	4.53	3	2	▼1
Republicanos (Note: Until 2019, Republicanos was called the Brazilian Republican Party (PRB).)	333,668	4.33	3	3	Steady
Solidariedade	301,583	3.91	3	6	▲3
Progressistas	242,374	3.14	2	3	▲1
Brazilian Social Democracy Party	230,882	2.99	2	0	▼2
Progressive Republican Party (Note: The Progressive Republican Party (PRP) was merged into Patriota in 2019.)	215,894	2.80	2	N/A	▼2
Humanist Party of Solidarity (Note: The Humanist Party of Solidarity (PHS) was merged into Podemos in 2019)	211,225	2.74	2	N/A	▼2
New Party	208,572	2.70	2	0	▼2
Social Christian Party	187,775	2.44	2	3	▲1
Brazilian Labour Renewal Party	180,198	2.34	1	1	Steady
Avante	173,006	2.24	1	3	▲2
Brazilian Socialist Party	165,872	2.15	1	3	▲2
Agir (Note: Until March 2022, Agir was called the Christian Labour Party (PTC).)	151,657	1.97	1	0	▼1
Patriota	142,300	1.85	1	1	Steady
Communist Party of Brazil (Note: The Free Fatherland Party (PPL) merged into the Communist Party of Brazil (PCdoB) in 2019.)	140,369	1.82	1	1	Steady
Christian Democracy	132,788	1.72	2	1	▼1
Liberal Party (Note: Until 2019, the Liberal Party was called the Party of the Republic)	130,382	1.69	1	13	▲12
Brazilian Woman's Party	130,331	1.69	1	0	▼1
Republican Party of the Social Order	123,819	1.61	1	2	▲1
Cidadania (Note: Until 2019, Cidadania was called the Popular Socialist Party (PPS).)	112,517	1.46	1	0	▼1
Brazilian Labour Party	109,698	1.42	1	3	▲2
Podemos	106,514	1.38	1	2	▲1
Party of National Mobilization	57,252	0.74	0	0	Steady
Green Party	52,770	0.68	0	1	▲1
Sustainability Network	27,223	0.35	0	0	Steady
Free Fatherland Party	16,734	0.22	0	N/A	Steady
Brazilian Communist Party	6,382	0.08	0	0	Steady
United Socialist Workers' Party	3,426	0.04	0	0	Steady
Brazil Union	0	0.00	New	11	▲11
Total	7,711,213	100.00	70	70	–
Valid votes	7,711,213	81.39			
Invalid votes	1,134,456	11.97			
Blank votes	628,772	6.64			
Total votes	9,474,441	100.00			
Registered voters/turnout	12,401,199	76.40			

== Gubernatorial candidates ==
The party conventions began on 20 July and continued until 5 August. The following political parties had confirmed their candidacies. Political parties had until 15 August 2022 to formally register their candidates.

=== Confirmed candidates ===
Party	Candidate	Most relevant political office or occupation	Party	Running mate	Coalition	Electoral number	TV time per party/coalition	Refs.
Liberal Party (PL)	Cláudio Castro	Governor of Rio de Janeiro (since 2021)	Brazil Union (UNIÃO)	Thiago Pampolha	Rio United and Stronger: Liberal Party (PL); Brazilian Democratic Movement (MDB); Progressistas (PP); Brazil Union (UNIÃO); Republicans; Solidariedade; Social Christian Party (PSC); Brazilian Labour Party (PTB); Avante; Podemos (PODE); Brazilian Labour Renewal Party (PRTB); Republican Party of the Social Order (PROS); Party of National Mobilization (PMN); Christian Democracy (DC)	22	4min and 51sec	
Brazilian Socialist Party (PSB)	Marcelo Freixo	Federal Deputy from Rio de Janeiro (since 2019)	Brazilian Social Democracy Party (PSDB)	Cesar Maia	Life Will Get Better: Brazilian Socialist Party (PSB); Brazil of Hope; Workers' Party (PT); Communist Party of Brazil (PCdoB); Green Party (PV); PSOL REDE; Socialism and Liberty Party (PSOL); Sustainability Network (REDE); Always Forward; Brazilian Social Democracy Party (PSDB); Cidadania	40	3min and 04sec	
Democratic Labour Party (PDT)	Rodrigo Neves	Mayor of Niterói (2013–2020)	Social Democratic Party (PSD)	Felipe Santa Cruz	To Change With Those Who Know How To Govern: Democratic Labour Party (PDT); Social Democratic Party (PSD); Patriota; Act (AGIR)	12	1min and 40sec	
New Party (NOVO)	Paulo Ganime	Federal Deputy from Rio de Janeiro (since 2019)	New Party (NOVO)	Helio Secco	—N/a	30	24sec	
United Socialist Workers' Party (PSTU)	Cyro Garcia	Federal Deputy from Rio de Janeiro (1992–1993)	United Socialist Workers' Party (PSTU)	Samantha Guedes	—N/a	16	—N/a	
Brazilian Communist Party (PCB)	Eduardo Serra	Teacher at the Institute of International Relations and Defense of Federal University of Rio de Janeiro (UFRJ).	Brazilian Communist Party (PCB)	Bianca Novaes	—N/a	21	—N/a	
Popular Unity (UP)	Juliete	National coordinator of the MLB (Movement of the Struggle in the Neighbourhoods, Villages and Favelas).	Popular Unity (UP)	Juliana Alves	—N/a	80	—N/a	
Workers' Cause Party (PCO)	Luiz Eugênio Honorato	Retired steelworker.	Workers' Cause Party (PCO)	Guilherme de Lima	—N/a	29	—N/a	
Brazilian Woman's Party (PMB)	Wilson Witzel	Governor of Rio de Janeiro (2019–2021)	Brazilian Woman's Party (PMB)	Sidclei Bernardo	—N/a	35	—N/a	
The television time reserved for political propaganda for each election was distributed among all parties and coalitions that had a candidate and representation in the Chamber of Deputies.							Total: 10 minutes	

=== Withdrawn candidates ===
- Felipe Santa Cruz (PSD) - president of the Order of Attorneys of Brazil (Brazilian Bar Association - OAB) (2019–2022). The announcement was made by the mayor of Rio de Janeiro, Eduardo Paes, a political ally of Cruz. According to Paes, the Social Democratic Party decided to support the candidacy of Rodrigo Neves for the government. The agreement defined that Santa Cruz would be Neves' running mate.
- Roberto Jefferson (PTB) - federal deputy from Rio de Janeiro (1983–2005). Jefferson was on house arrest since August 2021. His candidacy was announced by his daughter, Cristiane Brasil, in June 2022. However, in July, the party decided not to announce a candidacy for the state election, and they opted instead for candidates for the Legislative Assembly of Rio de Janeiro and the Chamber of Deputies.
- Anthony Garotinho (UNIÃO) - governor of Rio de Janeiro (1999–2002). He announced his candidacy in May 2022. However, in July, the Regional Electoral Court of Rio de Janeiro ratified his criminal conviction for vote buying, making him ineligible by the electoral law again. The party decided to not launch his candidacy. Later, Garotinho announced his candidacy for the Chamber of Deputies.
- Colonel Emir Larangeira (PMB) - state deputy of Rio de Janeiro (1991–1995). He was announced as a candidate in May 2022, but was defeated in the party primaries in July by the former governor of Rio de Janeiro, Wilson Witzel.
- Washington Reis (MDB) - mayor of Duque de Caxias for two periods: 2005–2008 and 2017–2022, federal deputy from Rio de Janeiro (2011–2016). Brazilian businessman and politician. Reis resigned from the position as candidate for vice governor on Cláudio Castro's ticket due to Electoral Justice's decision on not allowing Reis to run as candidate. Due the limited time to seek Justice's approval on his name, Reis resigned.
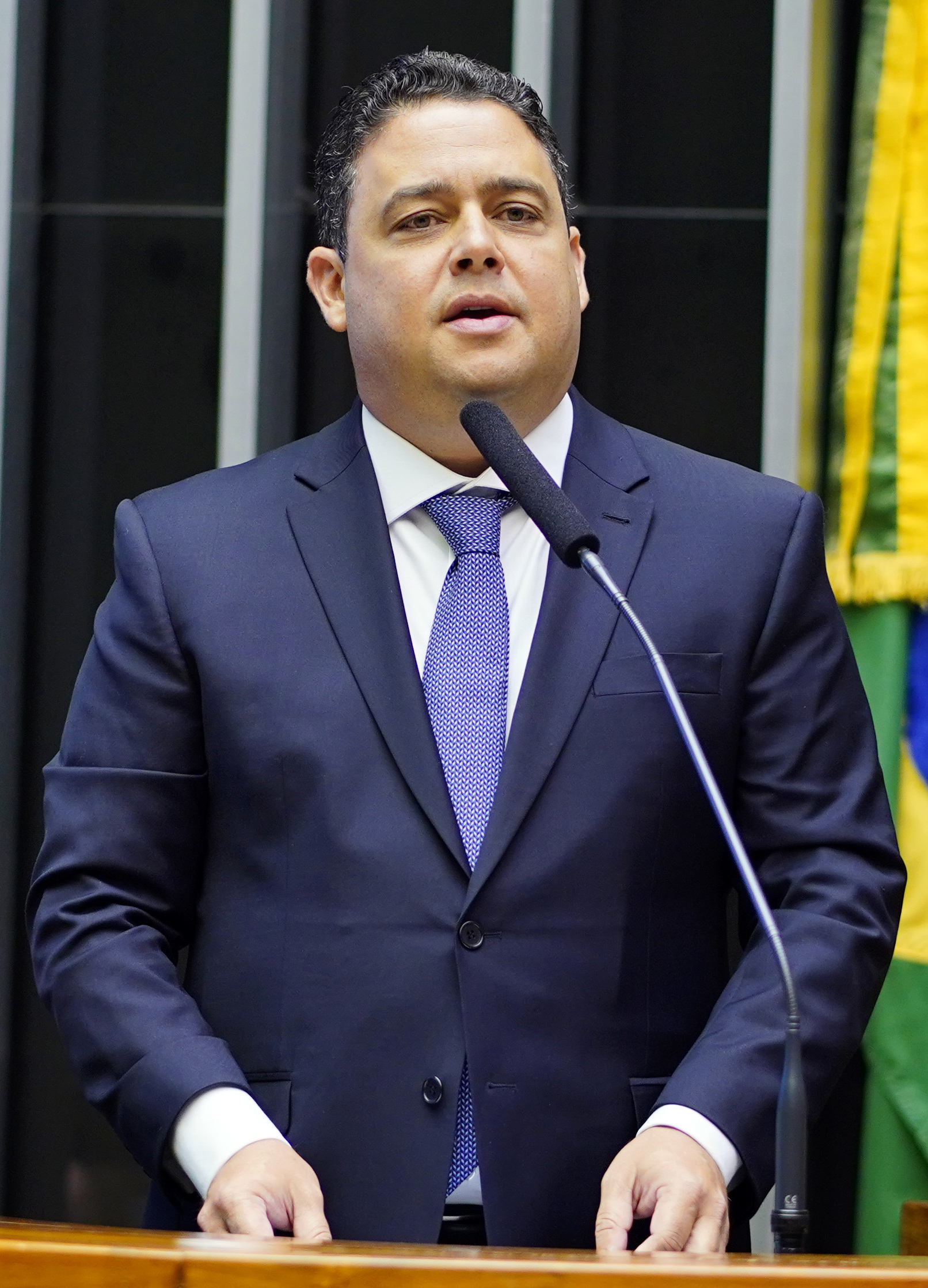
President of the Order of Attorneys of Brazil (OAB)
Felipe Santa Cruz (PSD)
(2019–2022)

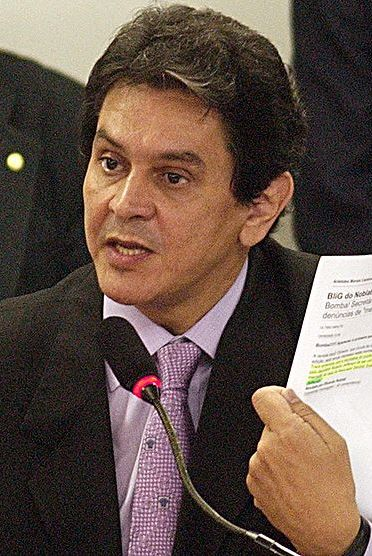
Federal deputy from Rio de Janeiro
Roberto Jefferson (PTB)
(1983–2005)

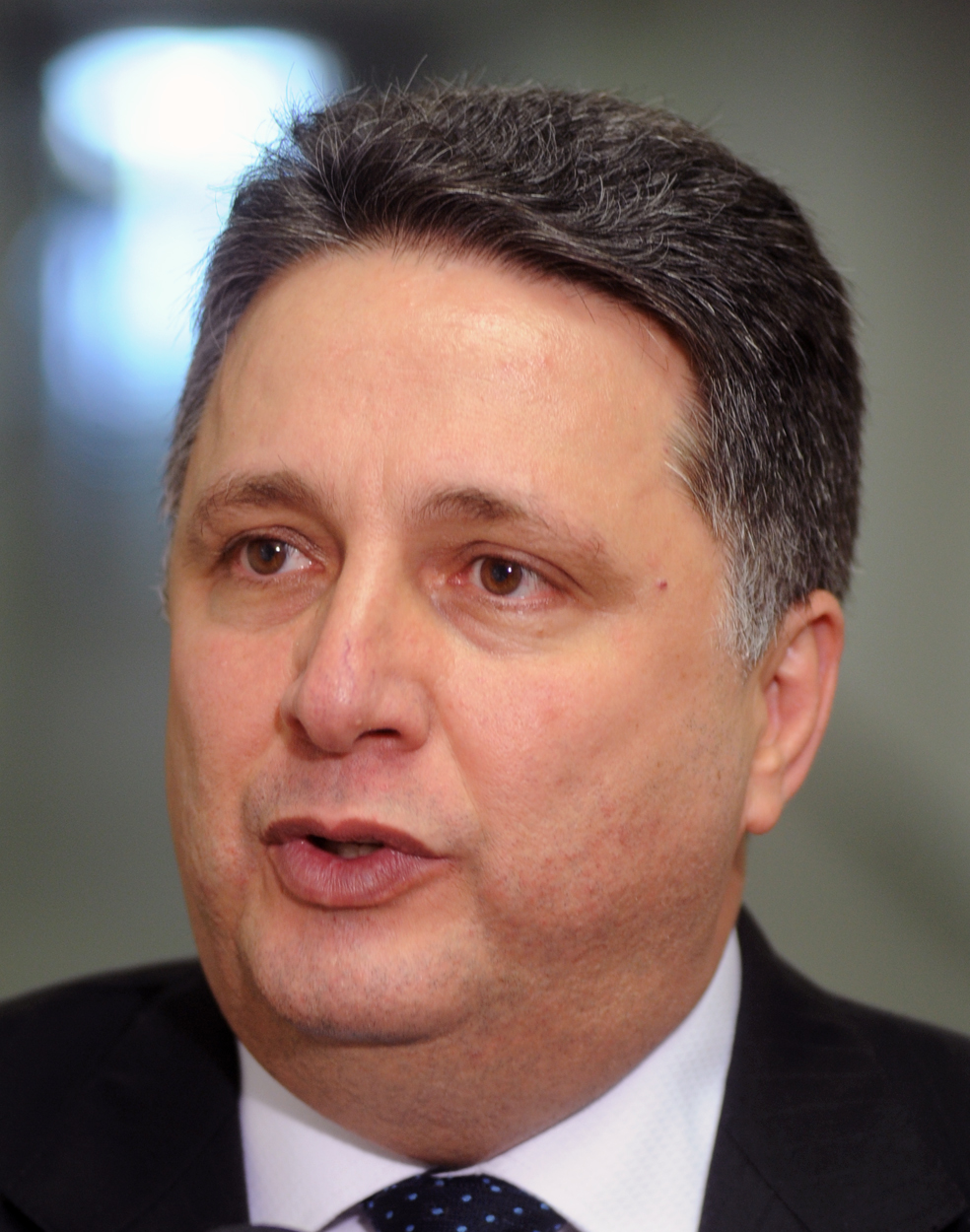
Governor of Rio de Janeiro
Anthony Garotinho (UNIÃO)
(1999–2002)

== Senatorial candidates ==
The party conventions began on 20 July and continued until 5 August. The following political parties had confirmed their candidacies. Political parties had until 15 August 2022 to formally register their candidates.

=== Confirmed candidates ===
Party	Candidate	Most relevant political office or occupation	Party	Candidates for alternate senators	Coalition	Electoral number	TV time per party/coalition	Ref.
Liberal Party (PL)	Romário	Senator for Rio de Janeiro (since 2015)	Liberal Party (PL)	1st alternate senator: Bruno Bonetti	—N/a	222	TBD	
Liberal Party (PL)	Romário	Senator for Rio de Janeiro (since 2015)	Liberal Party (PL)	2nd alternate senator: Andrea Fontes	—N/a	222	TBD	
Brazilian Socialist Party (PSB)	Alessandro Molon	Federal Deputy from Rio de Janeiro (since 2011)	Brazilian Socialist Party (PSB)	1st alternate senator: Anderson Quack	—N/a	400	TBD	
Brazilian Socialist Party (PSB)	Alessandro Molon	Federal Deputy from Rio de Janeiro (since 2011)	Brazilian Socialist Party (PSB)	2nd alternate senator: Uiara Martins	—N/a	400	TBD	
Brazil Union (UNIÃO)	Clarissa	Federal Deputy from Rio de Janeiro (since 2015)	Brazil Union (UNIÃO)	1st alternate senator: Algacir Moulin	—N/a	444	TBD	
Brazil Union (UNIÃO)	Clarissa	Federal Deputy from Rio de Janeiro (since 2015)	Brazil Union (UNIÃO)	2nd alternate senator: Dudu Canella	—N/a	444	TBD	
Brazilian Labour Party (PTB)	Daniel Silveira	Federal Deputy from Rio de Janeiro (since 2019)	Brazilian Labour Party (PTB)	1st alternate senator: André Monteiro	—N/a	142	TBD	
Brazilian Labour Party (PTB)	Daniel Silveira	Federal Deputy from Rio de Janeiro (since 2019)	Brazilian Labour Party (PTB)	2nd alternate senator: Marão Lilinho	—N/a	142	TBD	
Workers' Party (PT)	André Ceciliano	President of the Legislative Assembly of Rio de Janeiro (since 2019)	Green Party (PV)	1st alternate senator: Sergio Zveiter	Brazil of Hope: Workers' Party (PT); Communist Party of Brazil (PCdoB); Green Party (PV)	133	TBD	
Workers' Party (PT)	André Ceciliano	President of the Legislative Assembly of Rio de Janeiro (since 2019)	Green Party (PV)	2nd alternate senator: Wilson Borges	Brazil of Hope: Workers' Party (PT); Communist Party of Brazil (PCdoB); Green Party (PV)	133	TBD	
Democratic Labour Party (PDT)	Cabo Daciolo	Federal Deputy from Rio de Janeiro (2015–2019)	Democratic Labour Party (PDT)	1st alternate senator: Negrogun	—N/a	120	TBD	
Democratic Labour Party (PDT)	Cabo Daciolo	Federal Deputy from Rio de Janeiro (2015–2019)	Democratic Labour Party (PDT)	2nd alternate senator: Mara Hofans	—N/a	120	TBD	
Forward (AVANTE)	Itagiba	Federal Deputy from Rio de Janeiro (2007–2011)	Forward (AVANTE)	1st alternate senator: Amato	—N/a	700	TBD	
Forward (AVANTE)	Itagiba	Federal Deputy from Rio de Janeiro (2007–2011)	Forward (AVANTE)	2nd alternate senator: Anderson Claudino	—N/a	700	TBD	
United Socialist Workers' Party (PSTU)	Bárbara Sinedino	Teacher	United Socialist Workers' Party (PSTU)	1st alternate senator: Sérgio Perdigão	—N/a	160	TBD	
United Socialist Workers' Party (PSTU)	Bárbara Sinedino	Teacher	United Socialist Workers' Party (PSTU)	2nd alternate senator: Rodrigo da Silva	—N/a	160	TBD	
Popular Unity (UP)	Raul	Civil servant	Popular Unity (UP)	1st alternate senator: Gabriela Gonçalves	—N/a	800	TBD	
Popular Unity (UP)	Raul	Civil servant	Popular Unity (UP)	2nd alternate senator: Formigão	—N/a	800	TBD	
Brazilian Woman's Party (PMB)	Dr. Paulo Marcelo	Medical doctor	Brazilian Woman's Party (PMB)	1st alternate senator: Alexandre Cardoso	—N/a	355	TBD	
Brazilian Woman's Party (PMB)	Dr. Paulo Marcelo	Medical doctor	Brazilian Woman's Party (PMB)	2nd alternate senator: Marlucia Cruz	—N/a	355	TBD	
Workers' Cause Party (PCO)	Antonio Hermano	n/a	Workers' Cause Party (PCO)	1st alternate senator: Aloizio Lamy	—N/a	290	TBD	
Workers' Cause Party (PCO)	Antonio Hermano	n/a	Workers' Cause Party (PCO)	2nd alternate senator: Bruno Maia de Sá	—N/a	290	TBD	
Brazilian Communist Party (PCB)	Hiran Roedel	Retired civil servant	Brazilian Communist Party (PCB)	1st alternate senator: Marta Barçante	—N/a	211	TBD	
Brazilian Communist Party (PCB)	Hiran Roedel	Retired civil servant	Brazilian Communist Party (PCB)	2nd alternate senator: Bruno Maia de Sá	—N/a	211	TBD	
Christian Democracy (DC)	Prof. Helvio Costa	Accountant	Christian Democracy (DC)	1st alternate senator: Pastor Antônio Carlos	—N/a	277	TBD	
Christian Democracy (DC)	Prof. Helvio Costa	Accountant	Christian Democracy (DC)	2nd alternate senator: Mister	—N/a	277	TBD	
The television time reserved for political propaganda for each election was distributed among all parties and coalitions that had a candidate and representation in the Chamber of Deputies.							Total: 5 minutes	

=== Withdrawn candidates ===
- Washington Reis (MDB) - mayor of Duque de Caxias for two periods: 2005–2008 and 2017–2022, federal deputy from Rio de Janeiro (2011–2016). Brazilian businessman and politician. Reis resigned from the mayoralty of Duque de Caxias in early April to run for the Senate, but withdrew from the race in June after being confirmed as a candidate for vice governor on Cláudio Castro's ticket.
- Luciana Boiteux (PSOL) - candidate for vice-mayor of Rio de Janeiro in 2016. Brazilian teacher, lawyer and politician. Boiteux withdrew her candidacy on 27 May 2022, after the Socialism and Liberty Party's decision to support Alessandro Molon's candidacy for the Senate.
- Carlos Fidalgo (Solidariedade) - president of Força Sindical of Rio de Janeiro since 2016. His candidacy was withdrawn on 7 June after the party declared support for André Ceciliano's candidacy for the Senate.
- Marcelo Crivella (Republicanos) - mayor of Rio de Janeiro (2017–2021) and senator for Rio de Janeiro (2003–2017). He withdrew his candidacy to run for a seat in the Chamber of Deputies.
- Ivanir dos Santos (PDT) - babalawo and professor. He was announced as a candidate in June 2022 after Cabo Daciolo's initial withdrawal from the Senate race, but Daciolo decided to announce his candidacy again some weeks later, just before the deadline for political parties to define their candidacies. Daciolo ended up being the nominee on the Rodrigo Neves' ticket for the Senate race, and Ivanir refused to be nominated as an alternate senator on the ticket or to run for the Chamber of Deputies.
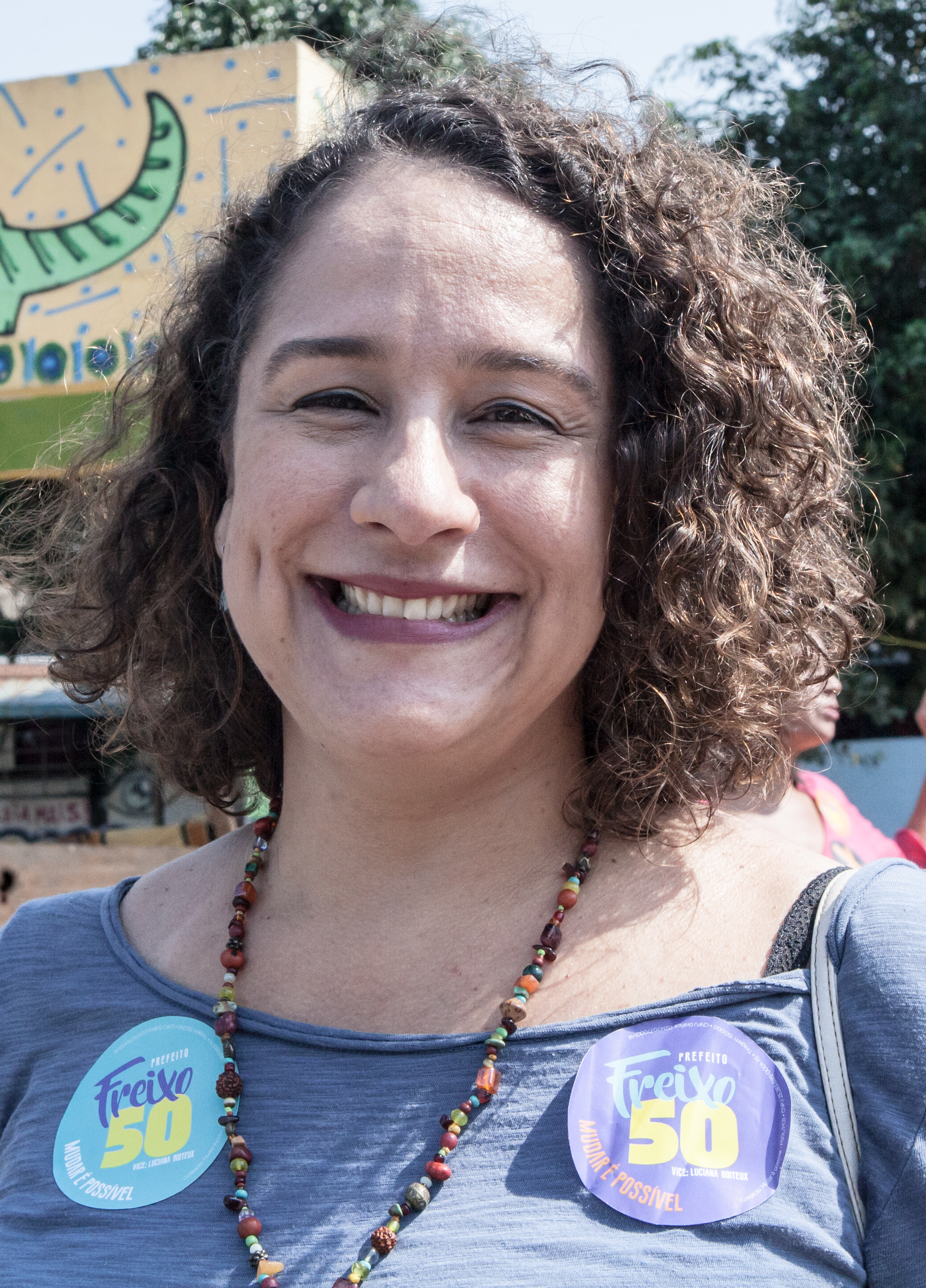
Teacher and lawyer
Luciana Boiteux (PSOL)

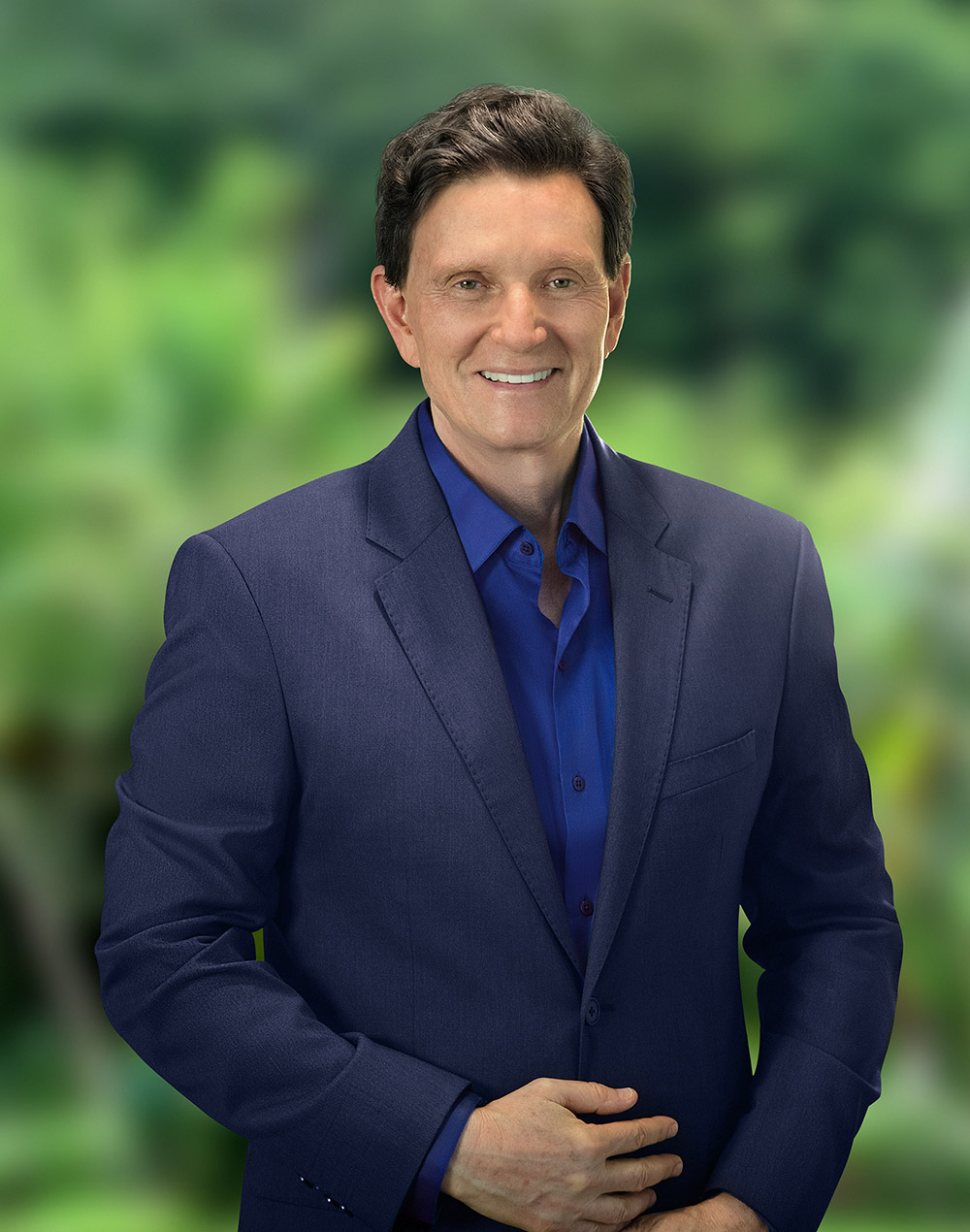
Mayor of Rio de Janeiro
Marcelo Crivella (Republicanos)
(2017–2021)

== Opinion polls ==
=== First round ===
The first round was scheduled to take place on 2 October 2022.

Pollster/client(s)	Date(s) conducted	Sample size	Freixo PSB	Castro PL	Neves PDT	Ganime NOVO	Cyro PSTU	Serra PCB	Pantoja UP	Others	Abst. Undec.	Lead
Datafolha	16–18 Aug 2022	1.204	23%	26%	5%	1%	4%	5%	2%	5% (Note: Wilson Witzel (PMB) with 4%; Milton Temer (PSOL) with 1% and Luiz Eugênio (PCO) with 0,3%)	29%	3%
Genial/Quaest	12–15 Aug 2022	1.500	19%	25%	6%	2%	4%	2%	2%	2% (Note: Wilson Witzel (PMB) with 2%)	37%	6%
Genial/Quaest	12–15 Aug 2022	1.500	19%	25%	7%	2%	4%	3%	2%	0% (Note: Luiz Eugênio (PCO) with 0%)	38%	6%
ModalMais/Futura	11–15 Aug 2022	800	17,1%	28,3%	5,4%	1,3%	2,8%	2,9%	1,5%	5,3% (Note: Wilson Witzel (PMB) with 5% and Luiz Eugênio (PCO) with 0,3%)	35,4%	11,2%
Globo/IPEC	12–14 Aug 2022	1.200	17%	21%	5%	1%	3%	3%	–	5% (Note: Wilson Witzel (PMB) with 4%; Milton Temer (PSOL) with 1% and Luiz Eugênio (PCO) with 0%)	39%	4%
Prefab Future	6–10 Aug 2022	2.000	9,6%	22,8%	4,7%	0,6%	1,6%	1%	–	1,2% (Note: Wilson Witzel (PMB) with 1%)	58,5%	13,2%
30–31 Jul 2022	Marcelo Crivella withdrawns his candidacy to run for Federal Deputy. Wilson Witzel is announced as a candidate by the Brazilian Woman's Party.											
Pollster/client(s)	Date(s) conducted	Sample size	Freixo PSB	Castro PL	Neves PDT	Ganime NOVO	Crivella Republicanos	Serra PCB	Cyro PSTU	Others	Abst. Undec.	Lead
Real Time Big Data	25–26 Jul 2022	1.500	24%	30%	9%	1%	–	0%	1%	2% (Note: Cel. Emir Larangeira (PMB) with 1% and Felipe Santa Cruz (PSD) with 1%)	23%	6%
Real Time Big Data	25–26 Jul 2022	1.500	24%	31%	9%	1%	–	0%	1%	1% (Note: Cel. Emir Larangeira (PMB) with 1%)	23%	7%
Instituto GERP	19–22 Jul 2022	1.020	20%	28%	11%	1%	–	2%	2%	2% (Note: Cel. Emir Larangeira (PMB) with 2%)	34%	8%
IPEC	16–19 Jul 2022	1.008	13%	19%	5%	1%	10%	3%	4%	9% (Note: Anthony Garotinho (UNIÃO) with 6%; Cel. Emir Larangeira (PMB) with 2% and Milton Temer (PSOL) with 1%)	37%	6%
IPEC	16–19 Jul 2022	1.008	14%	20%	6%	1%	–	4%	4%	12% (Note: Anthony Garotinho (UNIÃO) with 9%; Cel. Emir Larangeira (PMB) with 2% and Milton Temer (PSOL) with 1%)	39%	6%
13 Jul 2022	Felipe Santa Cruz withdraws his candidacy to be the running mate on Rodrigo Neves' ticket.											
Pollster/client(s)	Date(s) conducted	Sample size	Freixo PSB	Castro PL	Neves PDT	Ganime NOVO	Cruz PSD	Serra PCB	Cyro PSTU	Others	Abst. Undec.	Lead
Instituto GERP	8–12 Jul 2022	1.500	23%	27%	11%	1%	2%	1%	1%	1% (Note: Cel. Emir Larangeira (PMB) with 1%)	33%	4%
Genial/Quaest	8–11 Jul 2022	1.200	22%	24%	6%	1%	2%	2%	2%	7% (Note: Anthony Garotinho (UNIÃO) with 6% and Cel. Emir Larangeira (PMB) with 1%)	34%	2%
Datafolha	29 Jun–1 Jul 2022	1.218	22%	23%	7%	2%	2%	6%	5%	2% (Note: Cel. Emir Larangeira (PMB) with 2%)	32%	1%
Datafolha	29 Jun–1 Jul 2022	1.218	22%	21%	6%	2%	2%	5%	4%	9% (Note: Anthony Garotinho (UNIÃO) with 7% and Cel. Emir Larangeira (PMB) with 2%)	30%	1%
Real Time Big Data	27–28 Jun 2022	1.500	23%	26%	10%	1%	1%	1%	2%	(Note: Cel. Emir Larangeira (PMB) did not score in this opinion poll.)	36%	3%
Real Time Big Data	27–28 Jun 2022	1.500	23%	27%	10%	1%	–	–	2%	(Note: Cel. Emir Larangeira (PMB) did not score in this opinion poll.)	36%	4%
EXAME/IDEIA	10–15 Jun 2022	1.000	23%	24%	8%	2%	3%	1%	2%	13% (Note: Marcelo Crivella (Republicanos) with 10%; Cel. Emir Larangeira (PMB) with 2% and Milton Temer (PSOL) with 1%)	25%	1%
EXAME/IDEIA	10–15 Jun 2022	1.000	25%	29%	10%	2%	3%	1%	2%	3% (Note: Cel. Emir Larangeira (PMB) with 2% and Milton Temer (PSOL) with 1%)	25%	4%
Paraná Pesquisas	30 May–2 Jun 2022	1.540	21,4%	23,2%	8%	1%	2,3%	1,8%	1,7%	2,6% (Note: Cel. Emir Larangeira (PMB) with 2,6%)	37,9%	1,8%
Paraná Pesquisas	30 May–2 Jun 2022	1.540	22,4%	24,4%	9,4%	1,3%	–	2,1%	–	–	40,5%	2%
Prefab Future	27–31 May 2022	1.600	11%	15,1%	2,6%	0,7%	0,5%	1%	1,9%	10,9% (Note: Anthony Garotinho (UNIÃO) with 10,1%; Milton Temer (PSOL) with 0,4% and Ronaldo Gomlevsky (PL) with 0,4%)	56,3%	4,1%
IPEC	19–22 May 2022	1.008	15%	16%	6%	1%	2%	3%	5%	16% (Note: Marcelo Crivella (Republicanos) with 16%)	37%	Tie
IPEC	19–22 May 2022	1.008	17%	18%	8%	1%	2%	6%	5%	–	43%	1%
Instituto GERP	16–20 May 2022	1.020	21%	22%	10%	1%	2%	2%	1%	1% (Note: Cel. Emir Larangeira (PMB) with 1%)	40%	1%
Quaest/Genial	12–15 May 2022	1.200	18%	25%	8%	2%	1%	–	–	2% (Note: André Ceciliano (PT) with 2%)	43%	7%
Quaest/Genial	12–15 May 2022	1.200	19%	26%	8%	2%	2%	–	–	–	44%	7%
Quaest/Genial	12–15 May 2022	1.200	19%	27%	9%	3%	–	–	–	–	43%	8%
Datafolha	5–7 Apr 2022	1.200	22%	18%	7%	2%	3%	5%	4%	–	40%	4%
Datafolha	5–7 Apr 2022	1.200	18%	14%	5%	1%	2%	4%	3%	13% (Note: Anthony Garotinho (UNIÃO) with 7%; General Santos Cruz (PODE) with 4% and André Ceciliano (PT) with 2%)	39%	4%
Instituto GERP	21–24 Mar 2022	1.500	24%	21%	14%	1%	1%	–	–	–	39%	3%
Prefab Future	17–20 Mar 2022	1,243	15,4%	11%	4,3%	0,3%	0,6%	–	–	13,4% (Note: Anthony Garotinho (UNIÃO) with 12,5%; Milton Temer (PSOL) with 0,5% and Ronaldo Gomlevsky (PL) with 0,4%)	55%	2%
16 March 2022 – 6 April 2022	Hamilton Mourão joins Republicanos and confirms his candidacy for the Senate seat of Rio Grande do Sul. Rodrigo Maia gives up on his reelection bid.											
Pollster/client(s)	Date(s) conducted	Sample size	Castro PL	Freixo PSB	Neves PDT	Ganime NOVO	Cruz Ind.	Rocha PDT	Mourão PRTB	Others	Abst. Undec.	Lead
Quaest/Genial	15–18 Mar 2022	1.200	21%	17%	9%	1%	3%	–	–	4% (Note: André Ceciliano (PT) with 4%)	45%	4%
Quaest/Genial	15–18 Mar 2022	1.200	22%	18%	10%	2%	3%	–	–	–	46%	4%
Quaest/Genial	15–18 Mar 2022	1.200	24%	20%	–	4%	4%	–	–	–	48%	4%
Quaest/Genial	15–18 Mar 2022	1.200	23%	18%	10%	2%	–	–	–	–	46%	5%
Real Time Big Data	12–15 Mar 2022	1.500	23%	24%	10%	1%	2%	–	–	2% (Note: André Ceciliano (PT) with 2%)	38%	1%
Real Time Big Data	12–15 Mar 2022	1.500	25%	25%	11%	1%	–	–	–	–	38%	Tie
Quaest Pesquisa	22–26 Oct 2021	1.804	14%	19%	4%	–	–	–	–	26% (Note: Eduardo Paes (PSD) with 26%)	38%	7%
Quaest Pesquisa	22–26 Oct 2021	1.804	16%	25%	7%	–	3%	–	–	–	49%	9%
Quaest Pesquisa	22–26 Oct 2021	1.804	12%	23%	6%	–	3%	–	17%	–	39%	6%
Real Time Big Data	28–29 Sep 2021	1.200	18%	25%	9%	–	2%	–	–	–	46%	7%
Real Time Big Data	28–29 Sep 2021	1.200	18%	25%	10%	–	–	–	–	–	47%	7%
EXAME/IDEIA	23–26 Aug 2021	2.000	21%	22%	7%	–	–	–	–	16% (Note: Eduardo Paes (PSD) with 16%)	33%	1%
Instituto GERP	10–17 Aug 2021	1.200	6%	12%	7%	–	–	–	18%	15% (Note: Eduardo Paes (PSD) with 15%)	42%	3%
Instituto GERP	10–17 Aug 2021	1.200	11%	17%	12%	–	–	–	–	–	60%	5%
Atlas Intel	18–22 June 2021	807	20,2%	33%	4,4%	3,4%	2,2%	–	–	–	36,8%	12,8%
Atlas Intel	18–22 June 2021	807	19,1%	31,8%	–	3,5%	4%	1,8%	–	–	39,9%	12,7%
Paraná Pesquisas	28 May–1 June 2021	1.530	16,3%	23,8%	–	–	2,1%	23,1%	–	–	34,7%	0,7%
Paraná Pesquisas	28 May–1 June 2021	1.530	15,6%	23,5%	–	–	–	–	–	26,4% (Note: Washington Reis (MDB) with 8%; Bernardinho (NOVO) with 5,6% and Rodrigo Maia (Ind.) with 12,8%)	34,5%	2,9%
Paraná Pesquisas	28 May–1 June 2021	1.530	16,7%	25,2%	7%	–	–	–	–	14,8% (Note: Washington Reis (MDB) with 8.8%; Bernardinho (NOVO) with 6%)	36,3%	8,5%
Paraná Pesquisas	28 May–1 June 2021	1.530	13%	20,5%	1,3%	–	–	14,7%	–	21,3% (Note: Luciano Huck (Ind.) with 21.3%)	29,2%	0,8%

=== Second round ===
The second round (if necessary) was scheduled to take place on 30 October 2022.

Castro vs. Freixo

Pollster/client(s)	Date(s) conducted	Sample size	Castro PL	Freixo PSB	Abst. Undec.	Lead
Datafolha	16–18 Aug 2022	1.204	38%	39%	23%	1%
Genial/Quaest	12–15 Aug 2022	1.500	36%	32%	32%	4%
ModalMais/Futura	11–15 Aug 2022	800	40,3%	33,1%	26,6%	7,2%
Real Time Big Data	25–26 Jul 2022	1.500	40%	31%	29%	9%
IPEC	16–19 Jul 2022	1.008	34%	33%	33%	1%
Genial/Quaest	8 Jul–11 Jul 2022	1.200	36%	31%	33%	5%
Real Time Big Data	27–28 Jun 2022	1.500	37%	30%	33%	7%
EXAME/IDEIA	10–15 Jun 2022	1.000	38%	32%	30%	6%
Quaest/Genial	12–15 May 2022	1.200	38%	27%	35%	11%
Quaest/Genial (Note: Possible electoral scenario where the presidential candidate Lula (PT) supports Marcelo Freixo (PSB) for the government of Rio de Janeiro and Jair Bolsonaro (PL) supports Cláudio Castro (PL).)	12–15 May 2022	1.200	37%	40%	22%	3%
Quaest/Genial	15–18 Mar 2022	1.200	34%	30%	37%	4%
Quaest/Genial (Note: Possible electoral scenario where the presidential candidate Lula (PT) supports Marcelo Freixo (PSB) for the government of Rio de Janeiro and Jair Bolsonaro (PL) supports Cláudio Castro (PL).)	12–15 May 2022	1.200	36%	41%	23%	5%
Atlas Intel	18–22 June 2021	807	31%	37,3%	31.7%	6,3%

Neves vs. Freixo

Pollster/client(s)	Date(s) conducted	Sample size	Freixo PSB	Neves PDT	Abst. Undec.	Lead
Datafolha	16–18 Aug 2022	1.204	30%	28%	42%	2%
Real Time Big Data	25–26 Jul 2022	1.500	34%	31%	35%	3%
Genial/Quaest	8 Jul–11 Jul 2022	1.200	31%	24%	45%	7%
Real Time Big Data	27–28 Jun 2022	1.500	34%	29%	37%	5%
Quaest/Genial	12–15 May 2022	1.200	31%	27%	44%	4%
Quaest/Genial	15–18 Mar 2022	1.200	29%	24%	47%	5%
Atlas Intel	18–22 June 2021	807	34,6%	14,4%	51%	20,2%

Rocha vs. Freixo

Pollster/client(s)	Date(s) conducted	Sample size	Freixo PSB	Rocha PDT	Abst. Undec.	Lead
Atlas Intel	18–22 June 2021	807	36,2%	14,1%	49,7%	22,1%

Castro vs. Santa Cruz

Pollster/client(s)	Date(s) conducted	Sample size	Castro PL	Santa Cruz PSD	Abst. Undec.	Lead
EXAME/IDEIA	10–15 Jun 2022	1.000	46%	21%	33%	25%
Quaest/Genial	15–18 Mar 2022	1.200	39%	15%	47%	24%

Castro vs. Ganime

Pollster/client(s)	Date(s) conducted	Sample size	Castro PL	Ganime NOVO	Abst. Undec.	Lead
Quaest/Genial	15–18 Mar 2022	1.200	40%	11%	49%	29%

Castro vs. Neves

Pollster/client(s)	Date(s) conducted	Sample size	Castro PL	Neves PDT	Abst. Undec.	Lead
Genial/Quaest	12–15 Aug 2022	1.500	37%	24%	39%	13%
Real Time Big Data	25–26 Jul 2022	1.500	42%	27%	31%	15%
Genial/Quaest	8 Jul–11 Jul 2022	1.200	37%	21%	41%	16%
Real Time Big Data	27–28 Jun 2022	1.500	38%	26%	36%	12%
EXAME/IDEIA	10–15 Jun 2022	1.000	40%	26%	34%	14%
Quaest/Genial	12–15 May 2022	1.200	38%	24%	38%	14%
Quaest/Genial	15–18 Mar 2022	1.200	36%	20%	44%	16%

=== Senator ===
Pollster/client(s)	Date(s) conducted	Sample size	Romário PL	Daciolo PDT	Clarissa UNIÃO	Molon PSB	Silveira PTB	Ceciliano PT	Itagiba AVANTE	Sinedino PSTU	Others	Abst. Undec.	Lead
Datafolha	16–18 Aug 2022	1.204	31%	11%	4%	12%	7%	3%	1%	2%	1% (Note: Raul (UP) with 1% and Hiran Roedel (PCB) with 0%)	29%	19%
Genial/Quaest	12–15 Aug 2022	1.500	30%	10%	8%	10%	7%	4%	1%	1%	1% (Note: Raul (UP) with 1% and Hiran Roedel (PCB) with 0%)	28%	20%
ModalMais/Futura	11–15 Aug 2022	800	26,2%	–	7,9%	10,3%	5,2%	2,6%	0,9%	0,3%	4,1% (Note: Otoni de Paula (MDB) with 2,8%; Teacher Helvio Costa (DC) with 0,9%; Raul (UP) with 0,3% and Hiran Roedel (PCB) with 0,1%)	26,8%	15,9%
Globo/IPEC	12–14 Aug 2022	1.200	27%	8%	7%	7%	6%	4%	1%	2%	1% (Note: Raul (UP) with 1% and Hiran Roedel (PCB) with 0%)	38%	19%
Prefab Future	6–10 Aug 2022	2.000	18,4%	6,1%	6,2%	3,9%	5,8%	1,9%	–	–	–	57,7%	12,2%
31 Jul 2022	Marcelo Crivella withdrawns his candidacy to run for Federal Deputy.												
Pollster/client(s)	Date(s) conducted	Sample size	Romário PL	Crivella Republicanos	Clarissa UNIÃO	Molon PSB	Silveira PTB	Daciolo PDT	Itagiba AVANTE	Ceciliano PT	Others	Abst. Undec.	Lead
Real Time Big Data	25–26 Jul 2022	1.500	16%	12%	4%	17%	9%	–	0%	5%	3% (Note: Washington Reis (MDB) with 2%; Luciana Boiteux (PSOL) with 1% and Ivanir dos Santos (PDT) with 0%)	34%	1%
Instituto GERP	19–22 Jul 2022	1.020	26%	22%	–	16%	–	–	–	8%	–	28%	4%
IPEC	16–19 Jul 2022	1.008	30%	11%	6%	9%	6%	–	0%	4%	1% (Note: Ivanir dos Santos (PDT) with 1%)	32%	19%
IPEC	16–19 Jul 2022	1.008	39%	–	–	10%	8%	–	1%	5%	1% (Note: Ivanir dos Santos (PDT) with 1%)	36%	29%
IPEC	16–19 Jul 2022	1.008	41%	–	–	–	9%	–	2%	7%	3% (Note: Ivanir dos Santos (PDT) with 3%)	39%	32%
IPEC	16–19 Jul 2022	1.008	45%	–	–	10%	–	–	–	6%	3% (Note: Ivanir dos Santos (PDT) with 3%)	36%	35%
IPEC	16–19 Jul 2022	1.008	41%	–	–	–	–	–	–	35%	(Note: Possible electoral scenario where the presidential candidate Lula (PT) supports André Ceciliano (PT) for the Federal Senate and Jair Bolsonaro (PL) supports Romário (PL).)	25%	6%
Instituto GERP	8 Jul–12 Jul 2022	1.500	25%	17%	5%	15%	–	8%	–	4%	–	26%	8%
Genial/Quaest	8 Jul–11 Jul 2022	1.200	32%	–	9%	11%	7%	–	1%	5%	4% (Note: Otoni de Paula (MDB) with 4%)	33%	21%
29 June 2022	Cláudio Castro announces Washington Reis as his running mate.												
Pollster/client(s)	Date(s) conducted	Sample size	Romário PL	Crivella Republicanos	Clarissa UNIÃO	Molon PSB	Silveira PTB	Daciolo PDT	Reis MDB	Ceciliano PT	Others	Abst. Undec.	Lead
Real Time Big Data	27–28 Jun 2022	1.500	19%	–	–	14%	8%	–	4%	–	3% (Note: Luciana Boiteux (PSOL) with 2%, Marcelo Itagiba (AVANTE) with 1% and Ivanir dos Santos (PDT) with 0%)	47%	5%
EXAME/IDEIA	10–15 Jun 2022	1.000	23%	15%	4%	10%	7%	12%	3%	5%	8% (Note: Luciana Boiteux (PSOL) with 3%, Otoni de Paula (MDB) with 3% and Marcelo Itagiba (AVANTE) with 2%)	13%	6%
Paraná Pesquisas	30 May–2 Jun 2022	1.540	14,9%	10,3%	–	11,3%	8,1%	12,5%	3,1%	3,2%	2,7% (Note: Otoni de Paula (MDB) with 2,7%)	34%	2,4%
Prefab Future	27–31 May 2022	1.600	19,7%	10,4%	4,2%	4,4%	3,7%	6,7%	4,5%	1,7%	–	44,7%	9,3%
27 May 2022	Luciana Boiteux's candidacy is withdrawn by the Socialism and Liberty Party (PSOL), which decides to support Alessandro Molon.												
Pollster/client(s)	Date(s) conducted	Sample size	Romário PL	Crivella Republicanos	Clarissa UNIÃO	Molon PSB	Silveira PTB	Boiteux PSOL	Reis MDB	Ceciliano PT	Others	Abst. Undec.	Lead
IPEC	19–22 May 2022	1.008	29%	–	–	8%	8%	4%	–	6%	10% (Note: Cabo Daciolo (PDT) with 10%)	35%	19%
IPEC	19–22 May 2022	1.008	39%	–	–	–	–	7%	–	11%	–	43%	28%
IPEC	19–22 May 2022	1.008	34%	–	–	–	–	–	–	40%	(Note: Possible electoral scenario where the presidential candidate Lula (PT) supports André Ceciliano (PT) for the Federal Senate and Jair Bolsonaro (PL) supports Romário (PL))	25%	6%
Quaest/Genial	12–15 May 2022	1.200	19%	11%	6%	10%	4%	–	3%	2%	3% (Note: Otoni de Paula (MDB) with 3%)	41%	8%
Quaest/Genial	12–15 May 2022	1.200	25%	16%	–	11%	–	–	5%	4%	–	39%	9%
Quaest/Genial	12–15 May 2022	1.200	–	–	11%	14%	8%	–	13%	–	7% (Note: Otoni de Paula (MDB) with 7%)	46%	1%
Quaest/Genial	12–15 May 2022	1.200	27%	–	10%	–	–	–	11%	6%	8% (Note: Otoni de Paula (MDB) with 8%)	38%	16%
Instituto GERP	21–24 Mar 2022	1.500	18%	9%	6%	18%	–	–	7%	1%	4% (Note: Felipe Santa Cruz (PSD) with 4%)	37%	Tie
Prefab Future	17–20 Mar 2022	1.243	21,4%	11,4%	7,2%	5,5%	–	–	3,9%	2,2%	–	48,4%	10%
16 March 2022	Hamilton Mourão joins Republicanos and confirms his candidacy for the Senate seat of Rio Grande do Sul.												
Pollster/client(s)	Date(s) conducted	Sample size	Romário PL	Crivella Republicanos	Molon PSB	Otoni PSC	Silveira PTB	Clarissa PROS	Reis MDB	D'Ângelo PDT	Others	Abst. Undec.	Lead
Quaest/Genial	15–18 Mar 2022	1.200	25%	14%	7%	4%	3%	7%	6%	–	4% (Note: André Ceciliano (PT) with 4%)	31%	11%
Quaest/Genial	15–18 Mar 2022	1.200	29%	16%	8%	–	–	–	7%	–	5% (Note: André Ceciliano (PT) with 5%)	34%	13%
Quaest/Genial	15–18 Mar 2022	1.200	–	–	11%	7%	6%	13%	13%	–	–	51%	Tie
Quaest/Genial	15–18 Mar 2022	1.200	29%	–	–	7%	–	10%	10%	–	5% (Note: André Ceciliano (PT) with 5%)	39%	19%
Quaest Pesquisa	22–26 Oct 2021	1.804	19%	12%	12%	5%	–	8%	6%	–	2% (Note: André Ceciliano (PT) with 2%)	29%	7%
Quaest Pesquisa	22–26 Oct 2021	1.804	20%	12%	10%	4%	–	8%	5%	–	14% (Note: Hamilton Mourão (PRTB) with 12% and André Ceciliano (PT) with 2%)	21%	6%
Instituto GERP	10–17 Aug 2021	1.200	10%	9%	10%	–	–	–	4%	–	26% (Note: Jandira Feghali (PCdoB) and Benedita da Silva (PT) with 8%; Anthony Garotinho (PROS) and Rodrigo Maia with 4%; Felipe Santa Cruz and André Ceciliano (PT) with 1%)	41%	16%
Instituto GERP	10–17 Aug 2021	1.200	–	11%	11%	–	–	–	5%	–	26% (Note: Jandira Feghali (PCdoB) with 10%; Rodrigo Maia (Ind.) with 6%; Anthony Garotinho (PROS) with 5%; Felipe Santa Cruz (Ind.) with 3% and André Ceciliano (PT) with 2%)	47%	15%
Paraná Pesquisas	28 May–1 June 2021	1.530	14,6%	13,9%	8,5%	4,4%	–	–	4,4%	1,2%	24,3% (Note: Benedita da Silva (PT) with 18,7% and Eduardo Pazuello (Ind.) with 5,6%)	22,5%	9,7%
Paraná Pesquisas	28 May–1 June 2021	1.530	19,6%	16,1%	13,8%	6,1%	–	–	7,1%	1,8%	–	27,5%	3,5%

== Results ==
=== Governor ===
Candidate	Running mate	Party	Votes	%
Cláudio Castro (incumbent)	Thiago Pampolha (UNIÃO)	PL	4,930,288	58.69
Marcelo Freixo	César Maia (PSDB)	PSB	2,300,980	27.39
Rodrigo Neves	Felipe Santa Cruz (PSD)	PDT	672,291	8.00
Paulo Ganime	Hélio Secco	NOVO	446,580	5.32
Juliete Pantoja	Juliana Alves	UP	27,344	0.33
Cyro Garcia	Samantha Guedes	PSTU	12,627	0.15
Eduardo Serra	Bianca Novaes	PCB	10,852	0.13
Luiz Eugênio	Guilherme de Lima	PCO	1,844	
Total			8,400,962	100.00
Valid votes			8,400,962	84.91
Invalid votes			901,120	9.11
Blank votes			591,576	5.98
Total votes			9,893,658	100.00
Registered voters/turnout			12,809,126	77.24
PL hold				
Source: Superior Electoral Court

Popular vote
Castro	58.67%
Freixo	27.38%
Neves	8.00%
Others	5.94%

=== Senator ===
Candidate	Party	Votes	%
Romário Faria (incumbent)	PL	2,384,331	36.16
Alessandro Molon	PSB	1,731,786	26.26
Daniel Silveira	PTB	1,566,352	
Clarissa Garotinho	UNIÃO	1,145,413	17.37
André Ceciliano	PT	986,676	14.96
Cabo Daciolo	PDT	285,037	4.32
Marcelo Itagiba	Avante	18,224	0.28
Bárbara Sinedino	PSTU	18,222	0.28
Sued Haidar	PMB	11,933	0.18
Raul Pedreira	UP	7,299	0.11
Helvio Costa	DC	7,036	
Hiran Roedel	PCB	5,120	0.08
Antonio Hermano	PCO	1,198	
Total		6,594,041	100.00
Valid votes		6,594,041	66.66
Invalid votes		2,545,555	25.73
Blank votes		752,864	7.61
Total votes		9,892,460	100.00
Registered voters/turnout		12,809,126	77.23
PL hold			
Source: Superior Electoral Court

Popular vote
Romário	29.19%
Molon	21.20%
~~Silveira~~	19.18%
Clarissa	14.02%
Ceciliano	12.08%
Others	4.33%

=== Chamber of Deputies ===
Party or alliance		Votes	%	Seats	+/–
Liberal Party		1,717,302	20.03	11	▲9
Brazil Union		967,553	11.29	6	New
Brazil of Hope	Workers' Party	734,512	8.57	5	▲4
Brazil of Hope	Communist Party of Brazil	125,298	1.46	1	Steady
Brazil of Hope	Green Party	29,750	0.35	0	Steady
PSOL REDE Federation	Socialism and Liberty Party	697,920	8.14	5	▲1
PSOL REDE Federation	Sustainability Network	40,411	0.47	0	Steady
Social Democratic Party		689,255	8.04	4	▲1
Progressistas		569,050	6.64	3	▲1
Republicanos		494,330	5.77	3	▲1
Brazilian Democratic Movement		414,506	4.84	2	▼1
Podemos		267,667	3.12	1	▲1
Republican Party of the Social Order		243,889	2.85	1	Steady
Democratic Labour Party		232,718	2.71	1	▼1
Brazilian Socialist Party		214,135	2.50	1	Steady
Solidariedade		209,242	2.44	1	Steady
Brazilian Labour Party		177,247	2.07	1	▲1
Avante		132,568	1.55	0	▼1
Party of National Mobilization		95,910	1.12	0	Steady
Patriota		91,410	1.07	0	Steady
Always Forward	Cidadania	87,734	1.02	0	▼1
Always Forward	Brazilian Social Democracy Party	79,306	0.93	0	Steady
New Party		81,735	0.95	0	▼1
Agir		53,854	0.63	0	Steady
Social Christian Party		38,214	0.45	0	▼1
Brazilian Labour Renewal Party		36,225	0.42	0	Steady
Brazilian Woman's Party		21,964	0.26	0	Steady
Christian Democracy		17,465	0.20	0	▼1
Brazilian Communist Party		8,196	0.10	0	Steady
United Socialist Workers' Party		2,206	0.03	0	Steady
Workers' Cause Party		0	0.00	0	Steady
Total		8,571,572	100.00	46	–
Valid votes		8,575,988	86.68		
Invalid votes		701,290	7.09		
Blank votes		616,380	6.23		
Total votes		9,893,658	100.00		
Registered voters/turnout		12,809,126	77.24		

=== Legislative Assembly ===
Party or alliance		Votes	%	Seats	+/–
Liberal Party		1,828,019	21.53	17	▲16
Brazil Union		896,410	10.56	8	New
Brazil of Hope	Workers' Party	743,051	8.75	7	▲4
Brazil of Hope	Communist Party of Brazil	112,005	1.32	1	Steady
Brazil of Hope	Green Party	20,480	0.24	0	Steady
Social Democratic Party		645,331	7.60	6	▲2
PSOL REDE Federation	Socialism and Liberty Party	514,436	6.06	5	Steady
PSOL REDE Federation	Sustainability Network	13,656	0.16	0	Steady
Progressistas		414,957	4.89	4	▲2
Solidariedade		350,749	4.13	3	Steady
Republicanos		322,674	3.80	3	Steady
Podemos		306,085	3.60	2	▲2
Brazilian Democratic Movement		295,846	3.48	2	▼3
Democratic Labour Party		259,306	3.05	2	▼1
Republican Party of the Social Order		240,658	2.83	2	▲1
Brazilian Socialist Party		221,944	2.61	2	Steady
Brazilian Labour Party		195,205	2.30	1	Steady
Patriota		154,383	1.82	1	Steady
Agir		144,381	1.70	1	Steady
Social Christian Party		141,704	1.67	1	▼1
Party of National Mobilization		121,456	1.43	1	▲1
Avante		110,708	1.30	1	Steady
Christian Democracy		92,745	1.09	0	▼2
New Party		88,249	1.04	0	▼2
Brazilian Labour Renewal Party		85,943	1.01	0	▼1
Always Forward	Cidadania	62,296	0.73	0	▼1
Always Forward	Brazilian Social Democracy Party	36,493	0.43	0	▼2
Brazilian Woman's Party		44,792	0.53	0	▼1
Popular Unity		15,544	0.18	0	New
Brazilian Communist Party		7,857	0.09	0	Steady
United Socialist Workers' Party		3,899	0.05	0	Steady
Workers' Cause Party		0	0.00	0	Steady
Total		8,491,262	100.00	70	–
Valid votes		8,491,262	87.10		
Invalid votes		613,470	6.29		
Blank votes		644,435	6.61		
Total votes		9,749,167	100.00		
Registered voters/turnout		12,809,126	76.11		
