= Tarcísio Motta =

Brazilian teacher and politician

- Motta in 2023

Member of the Chamber of Deputies
- Incumbent
- Assumed office 1 February 2023
- Constituency: Rio de Janeiro

Councillor of Rio de Janeiro
- In office 1 January 2017 – 31 January 2023
- Succeeded by: Luciana Boiteux
- Constituency: At-large

Personal details
- Born: Tarcísio Motta de Carvalho; 28 January 1975 (age 51) Petrópolis, Rio de Janeiro, Brazil
- Party: PSOL (2005–present)
- Education: Fluminense Federal University

Tarcísio Motta de Carvalho (born 28 January 1975) is a Brazilian teacher and politician, who is affiliated with the Socialism and Liberty Party (PSOL). He is currently a federal deputy from the state of Rio de Janeiro, elected with around 160,000 votes. He had previously been a councillor in the city of Rio de Janeiro for two terms.

== Early life and career ==
Born in Petrópolis, Motta began his political career in political activism with Pastoral da Juventude, a Catholic social service organization. In 1998, he graduated with a history degree from Fluminense Federal University (UFF), having afterwards also completing masters and doctorate degrees at the same institution.

He was a teacher at a public municipal school in Duque de Caxias, having also taught at a state school. He was the director of the Duque de Caxias Center of the State Union of Educational Professionals (Sepe), and afterwards came to be the state director of the union between 2006 and 2012. He went on to be a teacher at a private school and a substitute professor at the Fluminense Federal University. In the years after, he became a teacher at Colégio Pedro II.

Motta helped to establish and would remain with PSOL. With the party, he ran to be governor in both 2014 and 2018, reaching 5th and 3rd place respectively. In the 2016 municipal elections in Rio de Janeiro, he was elected as a councilman, being the most voted candidate. In 2020, he was reelected councilman with 86,243 votes, the most voted candidate. From 2016 to 2018, he was the president of the state's PSOL branch, and was the municipal director of the party in Rio de Janeiro.

Motta is married and has 3 children.

== Councilman in Rio de Janeiro ==
A critic of Marcelo Crivella's administration during his time as mayor, Motta integrated the CPI of the bus system, and consistently criticized Crivella for his lack of interest in correcting system irregularities due to the government and other council members. Motta also led the CPI on the subject of floods, where he criticized the lack of investment by the municipal government towards preventing flood damage. With this second CPI, he denounced the cartel-like practice of contracting out projects by the city. In the CPI's conclusions, it proposed the indictment of Crivella and of municipal secretaries.

He had attempted to start a CPI into the Porto Maravilha project, to potentially find complaints of corruption in completed projects in the city's port zone and opened what he called the "black box" of Porto Maravilha, but with little success. In the Municipal Chamber, Motta was a defender of the impeachment of Crivella, commencing in 2019 due to an accusation of administrative impropriety, including signing an alternative report in favor of Crivella's impeachment, after the recommendation of the commission responsible for analyzing the petition rejected it.

He was able to pass a law he proposed that created Espaço Coruja, a reception program for children with the installation of a night space for infants for families who work or have classes at night. Motta has been a critic of the Bolsonaro administration, which led to Jair Bolsonaro's son Carlos Bolsonaro calling him "fofinho" in a pejorative manner in the Council Chamber.

As a party colleague in the Chamber of Councillors, Motta was responsible for reading in the plenary a text written by Marielle Franco, 13 days after her assassination, relating to the municipal education plan. Motta also provided three hours of testimony about the case to the police, referring to Marielle's interactions with various councillors during her final days. As the first anniversary of her assassination drew near in 2019, Motta marched in the Sambadrome with Mangueira samba school, whose march was made as a homage to Franco. The march won that year's samba school competition.

He was one of the strongest critics of the attempt by the municipality of Rio de Janeiro to remove books that were considered inappropriate for minors from the Bienal do Livro book fair for having allegedly promoted a scene with a same-sex kiss. Motta filed a case requiring an investigation into administrative impropriety, previous censorship and violations of freedom of expression. Attending the presenting of the filings made by Motta and fellow council member Renato Cinco, the public minister of the state of Rio de Janeiro opened an inquiry to investigate if there had been censorship at the Bienal by the municipality and by mayor Crivella.

== Controversies ==
In 2017, despite being licensed as a professor at a federal-level institution, Colégio Pedro II, his connection to the institution was criticized for supposedly having committed "political indoctrination" with "left-wing" bias at the institution. He was also accused of using the public institution as an informal base of operations for PSOL and running campaigns for candidates from the party at the school, as well as doing so during school hours. This principally occurred during the campaign of Marcelo Freixo during his run for mayor of Rio de Janeiro in 2016. Due to the federal connections of the school, an administrative impropriety suit made by the Public Prosecutor's Office against Motta moved forward, along with the Sindicato dos Servidores do Colégio Pedro II (Sindscope), the then-rector of the school, Oscar Halac, three other professors, and two employees of the school. PSOL was also a target of the suit, which had national repercussions due to its federal character. Motta commented that the filing of the suit was being based on "just political-ideological prejudices". The accusation was based on complaints made by relatives and students and, according to the federal prosecutors, proven by visits to the institution and depositions. In 2017, however, a federal judge threw out the complaint, alleging that, among other things, that the use of campaign stickers during school hours and in the school did not constitute administrative impropriety.

== Electoral results ==
Motta's electoral results are the following:

Year	Election	Position	Party	Coalition	Substitutes/Vice	Votes	Result
2014	Rio de Janeiro state elections	Governor	PSOL	No coalition	Renatão do Quilombo (PSOL)	712,734 (8.92%)	Not elected
2016	Rio de Janeiro municipal elections	Councillor	PSOL	Mudar É Possível (PSOL, PCB)	N/A	90,473 (3.10%)	Elected
2018	Rio de Janeiro state elections	Governor	PSOL	Mudar É Possível (PSOL, PCB)	Ivanete Silva (PSOL)	819,248 (10.72%)	Not elected
2020	Rio de Janeiro municipal elections	Councillor	PSOL	no coalition	N/A	86,243 (3.27%)	Elected
2022	Rio de Janeiro state elections	Federal deputy	PSOL	PSOL REDE Federation	N/A	159,928 (1.85%)	Elected
