= Luciana Boiteux =

Brazilian lawyer

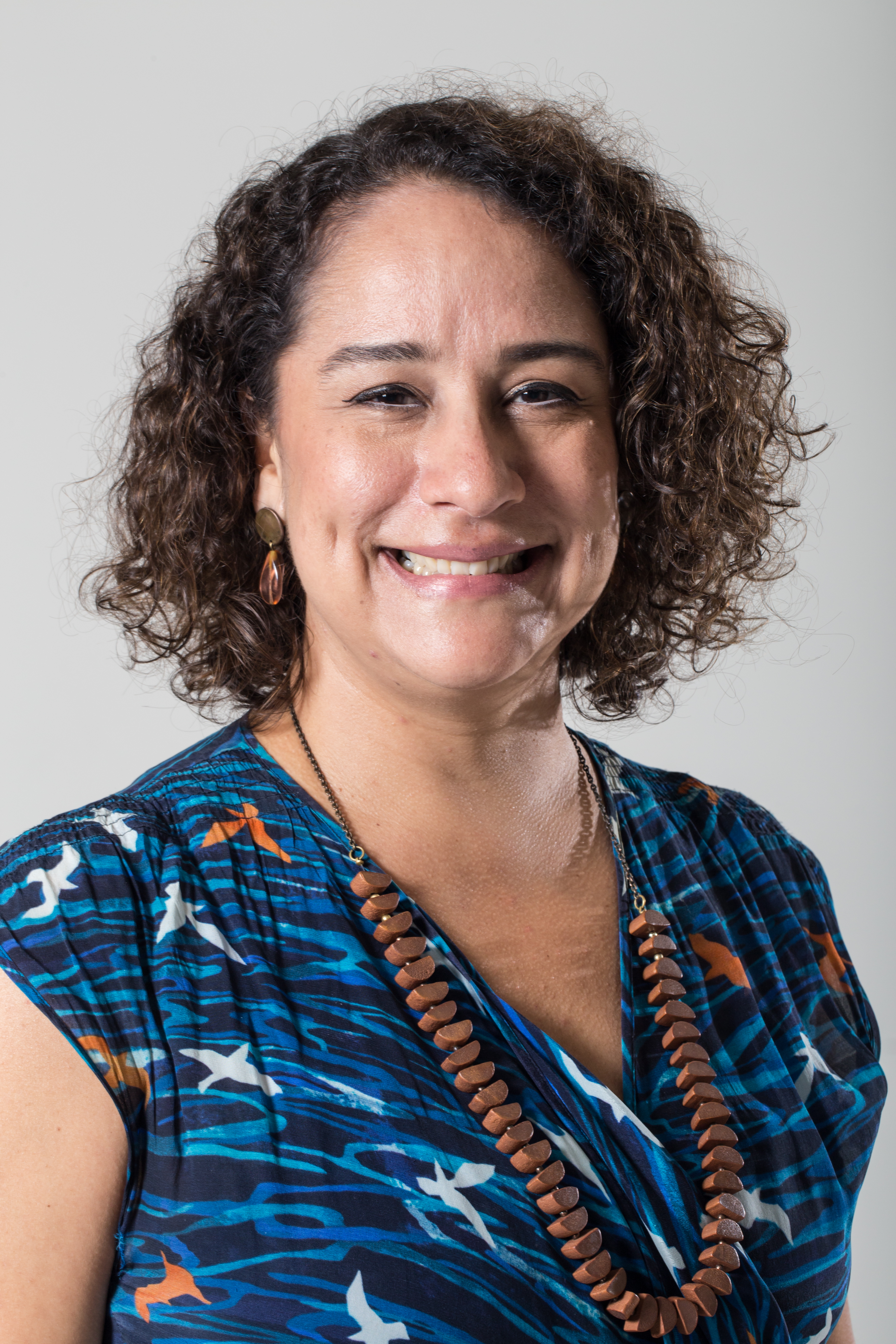

Councilwoman for Rio de Janeiro
- Incumbent
- Assumed office 1 February 2023
- Preceded by: Tarcísio Motta

Personal details
- Born: Luciana Boiteux de Figueiredo Rodrigues; 20 November 1972 (age 53) Rio de Janeiro, Brazil
- Party: PSOL (2016–present)

Luciana Boiteux de Figueiredo Rodrigues (born 20 November 1972) is a Brazilian lawyer, professor of criminal law and criminology at the Federal University of Rio de Janeiro (URFJ), researcher, feminist, and human rights activist. She is currently a councilwoman for the city of Rio de Janeiro, affiliated with the Socialism and Liberty Party (PSOL).

== Biography ==
Boiteux graduated with a bachelor's degree in law from Rio de Janeiro State University (UERJ). She did specialized research in economic criminal law with the University of Coimbra law school, as well as in international criminal law and international juridical cooperation with the Siracusa International Institute for Criminal Justice and Human Rights. She graduated with a master's degree in municipal law at UERJ, with her dissertation being The reverted panopticon: a history of prison and the vision of the imprisoned in Brazil. She furthered her studies and graduated with a doctorate in criminal law from the University of São Paulo with the thesis Penal control over illicit drugs: the impact of prohibitionism on the justice system and society. She has done research on topics such as the intersection of gender and incarceration, the politics of drugs and socioeducative systems, and the impact of drug laws on the penitentiary system and on minorities. She is often a go-to academic reference on the debate of cannabis legalization in Brazil. In her capacity as a lawyer, she assisted PSOL with bringing arguments to the Supreme Federal Court (STF) that intended to decriminalize abortion in Brazil up to the 10th week of gestation.

In 2016, Boiteux affiliated herself with PSOL and became a candidate for vice-mayor of Rio de Janeiro that year, with Marcelo Freixo being the candidate for mayor. They advanced to the run-off with 553,424 votes, or 18.26% of the vote. They faced off against Marcelo Crivella and Fernando Mac Dowell in the run-off, where they lost with 1,163,662 votes, or 40.67% of the vote. In 2018, she ran to become a federal deputy for PSOL, and received 15,839 votes, becoming a substitute for her party's coalition. In 2020, she ran to become a councilwoman for the city of Rio de Janeiro and received 8,909 votes, again becoming a substitute for her party. She assumed the mandate of councilwoman on 1 February 2023 after then-councilman and fellow PSOL member Tarcísio Motta resigned to become a federal deputy.
