= Cabo Daciolo =

Brazilian politician (born 1976)

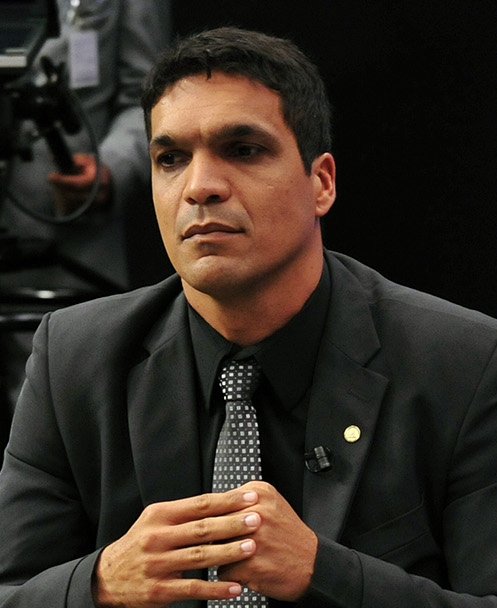

Federal Deputy
- In office 1 February 2015 – 1 February 2019
- Constituency: Rio de Janeiro

Personal details
- Born: Benevenuto Daciolo Fonseca dos Santos; 30 March 1976 (age 50) Florianópolis, Santa Catarina, Brazil
- Party: Mobiliza (2026–present)
- Other political affiliations: See list: PSOL (2014–2015); Avante (2015–2018); Patriota (2018–2019); PODE (2019–2020); PL (2020); PTB (2021); PROS (2022); PMB (2021–2022); PDT (2022–2024); Republicanos (2024–2026)
- Spouse: Cristiane Daciolo (died 2023)
- Profession: Military firefighter

Military service
- Allegiance: Rio de Janeiro
- Branch/service: Military Firefighters Corps
- Rank: 3rd Sergeant

Benevenuto Daciolo Fonseca dos Santos (born 30 March 1976), known as Cabo Daciolo (Corporal Daciolo in English), is a Brazilian military firefighter, pastor and politician affiliated to Republicans. In 2014, he was elected federal deputy. He was expelled from the Socialism and Liberty Party (PSOL) in 2015 and later affiliated to the Labour Party of Brazil (later Avante), Patriota, Podemos (PODE), Liberal Party and the Brazilian Woman's Party (PMB).

Daciolo gained notoriety in 2011, when he was one of the leaders of the firefighters' strike in Rio de Janeiro. The strikes occupied the headquarters of the corporation and camped in the staircases of the Legislative Assembly of Rio de Janeiro (ALERJ). Daciolo was arrested and detained for nine days in the Gericinó Penitentiary Complex. He became nationally known for being candidate on the 2018 Brazilian general election. With 1,348,323 votes (1.26% of the valid votes), he placed 6th. While he is widely known as Corporal Daciolo, in 2014 he was promoted by Rio de Janeiro Military Firefighters Corps to the rank of 3rd Sergeant, retiring at the end of the year.

== Personal life ==
Benevenuto Daciolo was born in Florianópolis and was married to journalist Cristiane Daciolo, deceased on 29 August 2023 due to complications of a leukemia diagnosed in 2018, whom they had 3 children. Graduated in tourism, Daciolo became known in 2011, when he was one of the leaders of the firefighters' strike in Rio de Janeiro. In the occasion, the strikers occupied the staircase of the Legislative Assembly of Rio de Janeiro. Daciolo was arrested for 9 days at the Bangu I penitentiary. Daciolo attended Bola de Neve Church and later became member of the Assembly of God Evangelical Church.

== Political career ==
Member of the Socialism and Liberty Party, he was elected federal representative for Rio de Janeiro at the 2014 state elections. In March 2015, Daciolo got into a controversy with his party after supporting the release of 12 police officers accused of participation in the torture and murder of bricklayer Amarildo Dias de Souza in 2013. In May of the same year, PSOL national directory voted, 53 to 1, to expel Daciolo from the party after he proposed a constitutional amendment to change the first paragraph of the Constitution of Brazil from "all the power comes from the people" to "all the power comes from God", which, according to the party, harms the secular state. In the same meeting, PSOL also voted, 31 to 24, to not recall his term to the Superior Electoral Court.

During the voting of the impeachment of Dilma Rousseff, Daciolo not only supported the removal of the president, but also of the vice president, Michel Temer, criticized the President of the Chamber, Eduardo Cunha, Rede Globo, and his state's governor and vice governor Luiz Fernando Pezão and Francisco Dornelles, respectively.

In December 2017, Daciolo was acquitted by the Supreme Federal Court based on a bill proposed by him when he was already the subject of a lawsuit. Daciolo was a defendant in a criminal lawsuit for criminal association (Article 288 of the Penal Code of Brazil) and for many articles of the National Security Law, but he was benefited by a bill proposed by himself which gave amnesty to military firefighters and police officers from many states who participated in strikes from 2011 to 2015. On 28 March 2018, he was launched by Patriota as candidate for President of Brazil.

In July 2018, in a session of the Chamber of Deputies, Daciolo "profetized" the cure of a fellow lawmaker, Mara Gabrilli, who is disabled. Daciolo spent most part of his electoral campaign at Monte das Oliveiras, a mount in the neighbourhood of Campo Grande, Rio de Janeiro.

For the 2022 presidential elections, Daciolo endorsed Ciro Gomes and almost got affiliated to the Democratic Labour Party (PDT). On 15 March 2022, he announced his pre-candidacy for governor of Rio de Janeiro for the Republican Party of the Social Order (PROS), but later the party's national executive rejected his candidacy. On 2 April 2022, he joined PDT to run for senator.

=== Candidate for President ===
In the 2018 presidential election, Daciolo was a candidate for Patriota party, finishing as the 6th most voted candidate with 1,348,323 votes, ahead of candidates such as Henrique Meirelles and Marina Silva. As the final results were released, Daciolo contested the numbers, criticizing the voting by DRE voting machines. In a suit filed to the Superior Electoral Court, he called for annulment of the voting, alleging fraud. The court stated that his suspicion was unfounded and that there were no confirmation of any fraud related to electronic voting machines, which were initially used in 1996.

During the campaign, he made controversial and irreverent statements, such as the "prophecy" that he would be elected president:

...I'm prophesying for the Brazilian nation, I will be the next President of the Republic, for the honor and glory of Lord Jesus, in the first round with 51% of the votes...

His statements made him a meme in the internet and a popular figure at the time, due to his statements remarked by religious citations and that mix messianism, theocracy, Christian fundamentalism and conspiracy theories. His way to speak made him very known by the Brazilian people in general and especially the Evangelical ones, who voted or supported him.

During a debate with other candidates, promoted by Rede Bandeirantes, Daciolo affirmed that the PDT candidate, Ciro Gomes, was one of the founders of São Paulo Forum and questioned him about his participation in the creation of a supposed Union of Socialist Republics of Latin America, the URSAL. Gomes, on the other hand, answered he's not the founder of the Forum and he didn't know anything about the hypothetical Union, causing laughter in the audience. The fact went viral on social media the following day, which treated the subject with humor.

== Electoral history ==
Year	Election	Party	Office	Coalition	Partners	Party	Votes	Percent	Result
2006	State Elections of Rio de Janeiro	PRTB	State Deputy	Growing with Rio (PRB, PRTB, PTN)	—N/a		2,976	0.04%	Surrogate
2008	Municipal Election of Rio de Janeiro	Republicanos	Councillor	Let's Fix Rio (PRB, PRTB, PR, PSDC)	—N/a		2,097	—N/a	Surrogate
2014	State Elections of Rio de Janeiro	PSOL	Federal Deputy	—N/a			49,831	0.65%	Elected
2018	Presidential election	Patriota	President	—N/a	Suelene Balduino	Patriota	1,348,323	1.26%	Not elected
2022	State Elections of Rio de Janeiro	PDT	Senator	—N/a	Luiz Eduardo Alves	PDT	285,037	3.49%	Not elected
2022	State Elections of Rio de Janeiro	PDT	Senator	—N/a	Mara Hofans	PDT	285,037	3.49%	Not elected
2026	State Elections of Amazonas	MOBILIZA	Governor	—N/a	Igor Bezerra	MOBILIZA	36,176	1.75%	Not elected

Party political offices
New political party	PATRI nominee for President of Brazil; 2018	Most recent
