= Clarissa Garotinho =

Brazilian politician (born 1982)

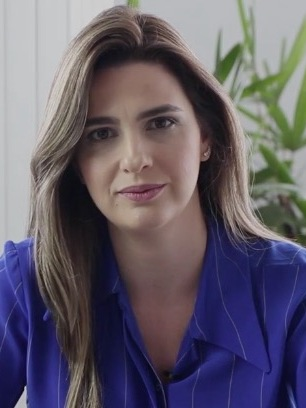
- Garotinho in 2022

Member of the Chamber of Deputies
- In office 1 February 2015 – 1 February 2023
- Constituency: Rio de Janeiro

Secretary for Development, Employment and Innovation for Rio de Janeiro
- In office 1 January 2017 – 12 April 2018
- Mayor: Marcelo Crivella

State Deputy of Rio de Janeiro
- In office 1 February 2011 – 31 January 2015
- Constituency: At-large

Councillor of Rio de Janeiro
- In office 1 February 2009 – 31 January 2011
- Constituency: At-large

Personal details
- Born: 2 July 1982 (age 44) Campos dos Goytacazes, RJ, Brazil
- Party: UNIÃO (2022-present)
- Other political affiliations: PROS (2018-2022); PRP (2016-2018); PL (2009-2016); MDB (2003-2009); PSB (2001-2003); PDT (1999-2000)

Clarissa Barros Assed Matheus de Oliveira (born 2 July 1982) more commonly known as Clarissa Garotinho is a Brazilian politician and journalist. She has spent her political career representing Rio de Janeiro, having served as state representative since 2015.

== Personal life ==
She is the daughter of Anthony Garotinho and Rosinha Garotinho. Garotinho comes from a political family, with both her parents serving as governors of the state of Rio de Janeiro. She is one of Anthony and Rosinha's nine children, with three being biological and five being adopted by her parents. In her youth she studied journalism at the Faculdades Integradas Hélio Alonso. As with the rest of her family Garotinho is a devout Presbyterian and a member of the Evangelical Caucus.

In January 2016 Garotinho announced that she was engaged to businessman Marcos Altive, and that the couple was expecting their first child.

== Political career ==
In 2009 due to controversy surrounding alleged partisan infidelity, Garotinho left the Brazilian Democratic Movement and joined the Party of the Republic. She was later acquitted of the charges, with her new party claiming that she was being "discriminated against" by the Brazilian Democratic Movement. That same year Garotinho was elected to the city council of Rio de Janeiro.

In 2012 the Garotinho and Maia political families joined to form what was considered by the Brazilian media an unexpected alliance to defeat the then-mayor of Rio de Janeiro, Eduardo Paes, who was running for reelection. The coalition between the two families and the PR/DEM parties was headed by Rodrigo Maia, son of former Rio mayor Cesar Maia, and had Clarissa as his vice mayoral candidate. This was considered controversial as Cesar Maia and Anthony Garotinho had been political rivals. However, the campaign was a failure as Eduardo Paes was comfortably reelected with more than 2 million votes or 64% of the ballot, while Maia and Garotinho obtained only 95,328 votes (3% of the ballot).

In the 2014 Brazilian general election Garotinho was elected to the Federal Chamber of Deputies, receiving 335,061.

Garotinho did not vote in the impeachment of then-president Dilma Rousseff, as she said she was unable to make it due to her pregnancy. Because of the way absentee ballots were counted, Garotinho's absence actually counted as a vote in favor of Rousseff. This was considered ironic as Garotinho's party and her own parents had been advocating for Rousseff's impeachment.

Garotinho voted against the 2016 and 2017 tax reforms.

In November 2016 Garotinho was once again expelled from a political party for partisan infidelity, as she was released from the Party of the Republic for collaborating with politicians from a rival faction in the legislature. She subsequently joined the Brazilian Republican Party or PRB on the invitation of Marcelo Crivella. Two years later Garotinho as well as her mother Rosinha were expelled from the PRB due to being investigated for corruption. Garotinho was still reelected in the 2018 Brazilian general election.

In February 2019 Garotinho announced that she would be running in the 2020 Rio de Janeiro mayoral election. In March 2022, she decided to join Brazil Union (UNIÃO).
