= Daniel Silveira =

Brazilian politician

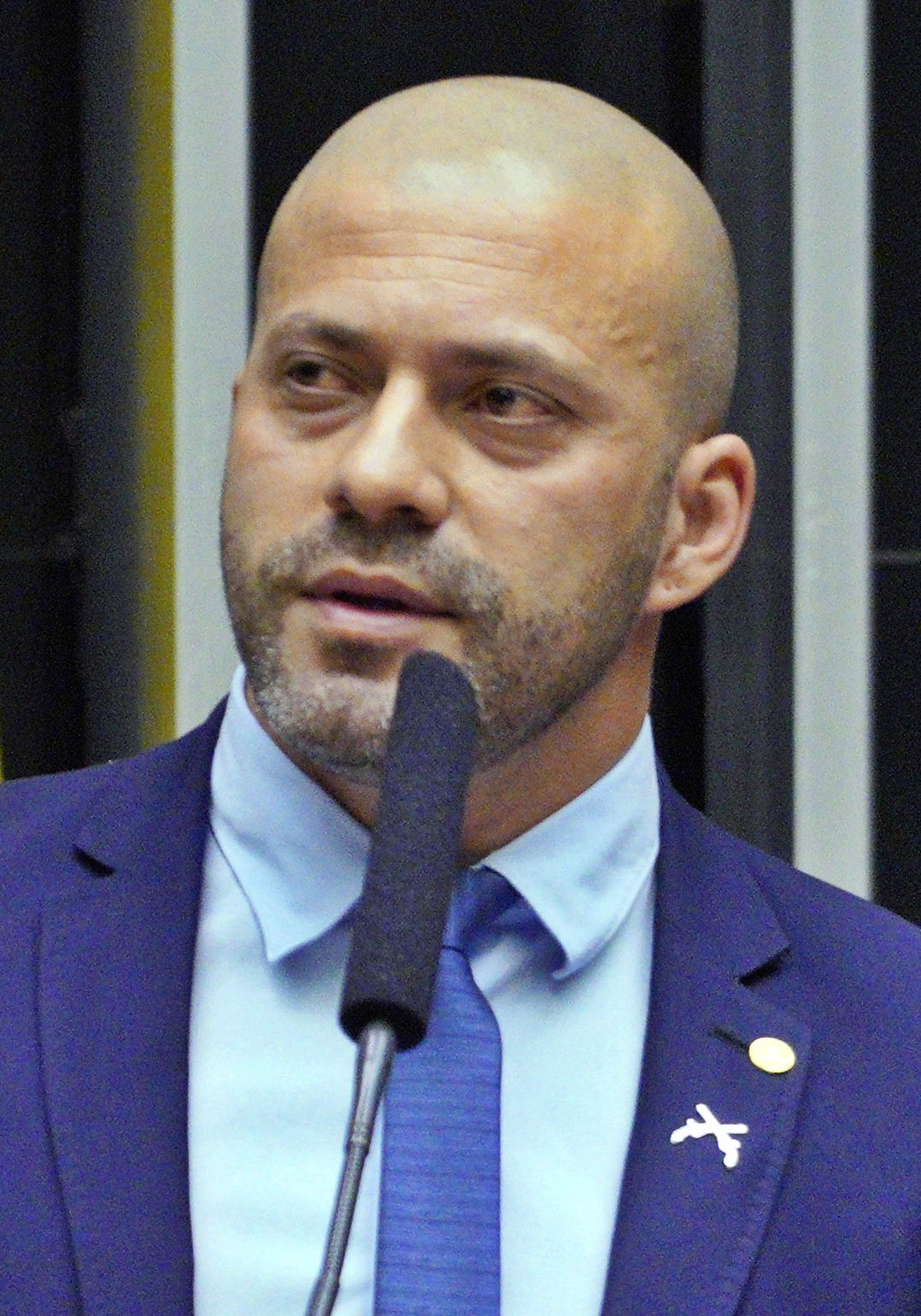

Member of the Chamber of Deputies
- In office 1 February 2019 – 1 February 2023
- Constituency: Rio de Janeiro

Personal details
- Born: Daniel Lucio da Silveira; 25 November 1982 (age 43) Petrópolis, Rio de Janeiro, Brazil
- Party: No party (2023–present)
- Other political affiliations: PSL (2018–2022); UNIÃO (2022); PTB (2022–2023)
- Occupation: Military police officer, politician, and lawyer

Military service
- Allegiance: Brazil
- Branch/service: Military Police of Rio de Janeiro State
- Years of service: 2012–2018
- Rank: Corporal
- Criminal information
- Status: In prison
- Convictions: Coercion in the course of the lawsuit; Violent abolition of the Democratic state; Prevent the free exercise of the Judiciary
- Penalty: 8 years and 9 months

Daniel Lucio da Silveira (born 25 November 1982) is a former Rio de Janeiro Military Police officer and Brazilian politician, previously affiliated with the PSL, UNIÃO, and PTB parties. He was a federal deputy for the state of Rio de Janeiro from 2019 to 2023.

Silveira was arrested on 16 February 2021 after publishing a video defending the extra-legal military act AI-5 and insulting and threatening ministers of the Federal Supreme Court.

== Career ==
Daniel Silveira was born in Petrópolis, Brazil, on 25 November 1982. While working as a bus conductor between 23 December 2006 and 17 January 2007, he obtained false certificates to justify work absences and was later prosecuted for fraud. Shortly thereafter, he took the exam to join the Military Police of Rio de Janeiro State, but due to the prior fraud allegations, Silveira was rejected in 2011. In 2012, he was allowed to join the police force after appealing in court, and in 2016 the fraud charges expired and the case was closed.

Silveira worked for Rio de Janeiro's military police between 2012 and 2018. While serving as an officer policing a protest against Jair Bolsonaro, he once stated he would like to shoot a demonstrator in the chest. His police record indicated further malpractice, with Silveira receiving 60 disciplinary sanctions, 14 reprimands and two warnings during his service, in addition to spending 26 days in prison and 54 in detention. A later police report considered him unsuitable for service in the military police. During his time as a police officer, he studied law at the Estácio de Sá University and completed his program in 2019. He is also a teacher of muay thai and self-defense.

He was elected in the 2018 elections as a federal deputy for Rio de Janeiro for the 56th legislature of the Chamber of Deputies, through the PSL, with 31,789 votes (0.41% of all valid votes).

Silveira became a notable figure prior to the 2018 elections due to a viral video on social media which showed Silveira and fellow candidate Rodrigo Amorim dismantling a plaque honoring Marielle Franco, a councilwoman murdered on 14 March 2018 in Rio de Janeiro. Silveira defended himself, claiming that the he helped remove the plaque because it covered signs for Praça Floriano Peixoto square, and because he wanted to send a message to criminals and gang members that they could not take over territory through ostentatious vandalism.

During sessions of Congress, Silveira voted in favor of the following notable bills and agendas: MP 867 (which, according to environmentalists, would amend the Forest Code and provide amnesty for deforesters); MP 910 (known as MP da Grilagem); PL 3723, which regulates hunting; the New Sanitation Legal Framework; church debt amnesty; Sergio Moro's "Anti-Crime Package"; Social Security Reform PEC; the freezing of public servants' salaries; and the convening of an Inter-American Convention Against Racism.

Silveira voted against the following proposals: the further criminalization of dam destruction; the exemption of teachers from new pension reforms; increases in the Party Fund; and alterations or decreases in the Electoral Fund.

During the floor vote regarding the FUNDEB funds supporting basic education, Silveira was absent for the first vote, and voted against the fund going only to public education in the second vote.

In February 2021, after his arrest was decreed by the Federal Supreme Court and confirmed by the Chamber of Deputies, Silveira left the PSL and joined the Brazilian Labor Party (PTB). He signed his party membership card from inside prison alongside the party's president, Roberto Jefferson.

== Controversies ==
=== Pedro II School ===
On 11 October 2019, Rodrigo Amorim and Daniel Silveira, both members of the PSL, went to the university Colégio Pedro II in São Cristóvão to conduct an inspection for their "Education Crusade". Oscar Halac, the dean of the institution, tried to prevent the entrance of the parliamentarians because they lacked proper authorization. Halac later said the incident demonstrated the two parliamentarians' lack of knowledge surrounding the institution's entry and exit rules. The dean also questioned Amorim and Silveira's motives, claiming their actions were driven by political interests. The dean reported the event to the Federal Police, asking them to investigate into potential abuses of authority by the parliamentarians. Rodrigo Amorim said that the "Education Crusade" had no "ideological scope" and claimed to have found evidence "strong indoctrination" in the places he visited. On 18 October 2019, the newspaper O Globo reported that the board of Colégio Pedro II filed an incident report with the Federal Police. Later that same month, it was announced that Daniel Silveira would have to respond to the case at the Federal Supreme Court (STF).

=== Journalist assault ===
In October 2019, Daniel Silveira was recorded on video antagonizing journalist Guga Noblat. Silveira threw the journalist's cell phone on the floor, saying: "I threw it. What's up, brother? I hit you, asshole. Go to the STF [Supreme Court] and sue me. You're an asshole, boy."

The Brazilian Association of Investigative Journalism (Abraji) later released a note criticizing the deputy's actions, stressing that they were not an isolated case. As evidence, they pointed to an incident on 20 September 2019, when Silveira amplified pieces of misinformation about the magazine AzMina online and criticized the work of its journalists. Abraji expressed solidarity with Guga Noblat and condemned Silveira's actions. The association also urged the Chamber of Deputies to take steps to determine whether a breach of parliamentary decorum occurred and, if so, to apply appropriate sanctions.

=== PL on victims of Communism in Brazil ===
In October 2019, Daniel Silveira filed a Bill (PL) aiming to institute a National Day of Remembrance for the Victims of Communism in Brazil. The deputy did not mention exact specifics surrounding "genocides" in the country. He also proposed the creation of campaigns that would "make Brazilians aware" of the "communist threat". Political scientist Eduardo Grin, of the Getúlio Vargas Foundation (FGV), called the PSL deputy's proposal "absurd" and denied the politician's claims about communism's history. (Note: The speech given by the deputy is part of a falsifiable speech already questioned by the scientific academy. There is consensus among scholars in the field regarding the false "communist threat" assigned to Brazil in the mid-twentieth century. It is noteworthy that the year 1964 marked "a clear division between two projects for the country: on one side was the national-developmentalism of Jango and, on the other," the associated-dependent developmentalism, whose main agent was foreign capital for the construction of capitalism in Brazil ". In view of this, the “communist threat” was a decisive political argument to justify the respective political coups, as well as to convince part of the society about the necessity of repressive measures against the left.)

=== Threats to the STF and TSE ===
In November 2019, after a Federal Supreme Court (STF) ruling annulled the arrest of former Brazilian President Lula da Silva, Daniel Silveira posted on Twitter: "If you need a corporal, I am available". His post referenced a prior statement by Eduardo Bolsonaro (PSL-SP), who said during his political campaign in 2018: "If you want to close the STF, do you know what you do? You don't even send a Jeep. Send a soldier and a corporal (…) Take the power of the pen from the hand of an STF minister, what is he on the street?"

According to an investigation by Aos Fatos in May 2020 on fake news, Daniel Silveira and a group of seven deputies published an average of two social network posts per day that contained misinformation or criticism targeting the STF, throughout a three-month period.

In December 2020, Silveira again threatened the STF in addition to the Superior Electoral Court (TSE) by defending the printed vote: "The printed vote will happen, or else the STF and the Electoral Justice will no longer exist, because we will not allow it". The deputy called the STF ministers 'marginals', and referred to Luís Roberto Barroso, the president of the TSE, as a "kid".

=== Prison sentences and releases from jail ===
On 16 February 2021, Daniel Silveira was arrested by the Federal Police after publishing a video defending the extra-legal military act AI-5 and insulting and threatening ministers of the Federal Supreme Court. The arrest warrant was issued by Minister Alexandre de Moraes. The following day, a STF plenary session voted unanimously, 11–0, to keep the congressman in prison.

On 19 February, the Chamber of Deputies decided to maintain Silveira's prison sentence in a 364–130 vote. Silveira left prison on 14 March 2021, intending to serve the remainder of his sentence at home while being monitored via an electronic anklet. However, on June 24, he was arrested again for repeated violations of the terms of his house arrest. He was released in November 2021.

== Electoral history ==
Year	Election	Party	Office	Votes	%	Result
2018	State of Rio de Janeiro	PSL	Congressman	31,789	0.41	Elected
2022	State of Rio de Janeiro	PTB	Senator	1,566,352	19.18	Not elected

== Bibliography ==
- Amado, Guilherme; Matsui, Naomi (2019). "Vídeo: Deputado do PSL arremessa celular de repórter no chão". Época. Rede Globo.
- Amorim, Paulo Henrique (2019). "Deputado do PSL quer criar o "Dia Nacional em memória das vitimas do Comunismo no Brasil"". Conversa Afiada.
- Andrada, Alexandre (2018). "O Golpe de 64 não salvou o país da ameaça comunista porque nunca houve ameaça nenhuma". The Intercept.
- Barreiros, Isabela (2019). "Existiu uma ameaça comunista em 1964?". Aventuras na História. Archived from the original on 3 January 2020.
- Bilenky, Thais (2019). "O deputado marombado". piaui.
- "Biografia Daniel Silveira". Câmara dos Deputados. 2020.
- Diretoria da Abraji (2019). "Deputado federal ataca jornalista na Câmara dos Deputados". Abraji.
- "Candidato: Daniel Silveira". Gazeta do Povo. 2018.
- Horta, Maurício (2018). "Mito: os militares impediram um golpe comunista em 1964". Super Abril.
- Lorran, Tácio (2019). "Deputado quer Dia das Vítimas do Comunismo no Brasil. Tem lógica?". Metrópoles.
- Marques, João Vítor (2018). "Candidatos do partido de Bolsonaro quebram placa que homenageava Marielle no Rio". Estado de Minas. O Globo.
- Motta, Rodrigo Patto Sá (2000). Em guarda contra o perigo vermelho: o anticomunismo no Brasil (1917–1964) (Thesis). Universidade de São Paulo.
- "Diretoria do Colégio Pedro II faz registro de ocorrência na PF contra deputados do PSL por abuso de autoridade". O Globo. Rede Globo. 2019.
- Romano, Giovanna (2019). "Deputado do PSL ameaça STF: 'Se precisar de um cabo, estou à disposição'". Veja.
- Sartori, Caio (2019). "Deputado que "inspecionou" escola no Rio responderá no STF". Terra.
- "Ex-CQC relata agressão de deputado que quebrou placa de Marielle". UOL. 2019.
- Vianna, Luiz Fernando (2019). "Daniel Silveira, o infiltrado, vive seus dias de glória". Época. Rede Globo.
- Werneck, Antônio; Leal, Arthur; Rodrigues, Renan (12 October 2019). "Deputados do PSL entram no Colégio Pedro II para 'vistoria' e provocam confusão". O Globo. Rede Globo.
