= Lagoa–Barra Highway =

Highway in Brazil

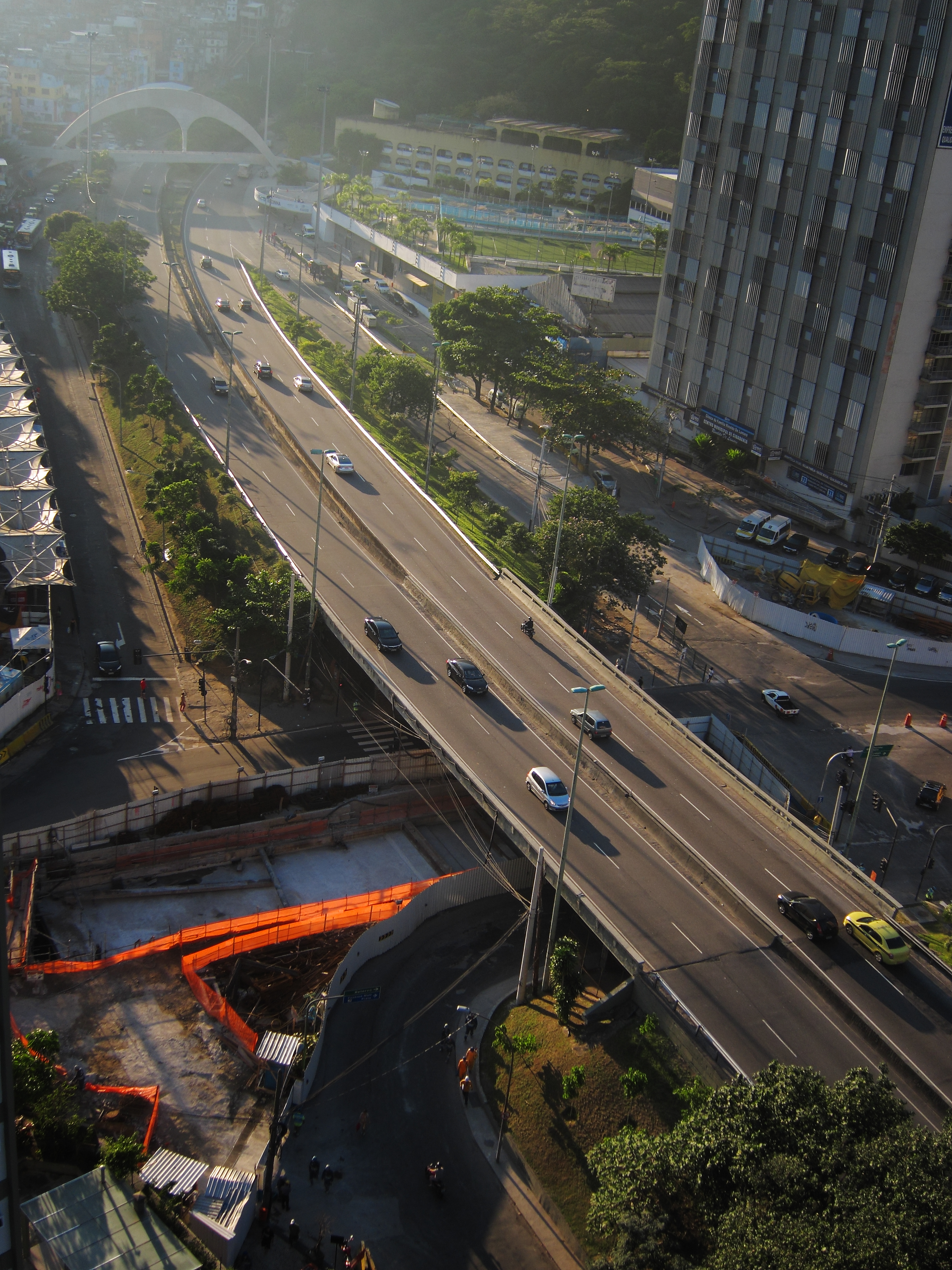
Lagoa-Barra Highway in Rio de Janeiro

The Lagoa–Barra Highway (Portuguese:Autoestrada Lagoa–Barra), officially named Engenheiro Fernando Mac Dowell Highway in honour of Fernando Mac Dowell, is a highway linking Gávea and Barra da Tijuca in Rio de Janeiro, Brazil. The highway was opened in 1971.
