= Poubel Filho =

Brazilian politician (born 2003)

Member of the Legislative Assembly of Rio de Janeiro
- Incumbent
- Assumed office 1 February 2027

Personal details
- Born: 11 August 2003 (age 23)
- Party: Liberal Party
- Parent: Filippe Poubel (father)

Kauan de Abreu Medeiros Poubel (born 11 August 2003), better known as Poubel Filho, is a Brazilian politician who was elected member of the Legislative Assembly of Rio de Janeiro in 2026. He is the son of Filippe Poubel.
