= Bola de Neve Church =

Evangelical Christian denomination founded in 1999

- Classification: Evangelical Protestant
- Orientation: Neo-charismatic
- Theology: Neo-charismatic theology
- Headquarters: Rua Clélia, 1517 – Lapa, São Paulo, Brazil
- Founder: Apóstolo Rina
- Origin: 1999; Rua 21 de Abril – Brás, São Paulo, Brazil
- Official website: www.boladeneve.com

Bola de Neve Church (Note: Literally Snowball Church) is a neopentecostal church founded in São Paulo, Brazil in 1999 by pastor, writer and former surfer Rinaldo Luiz de Seixas Pereira (April 15, 1972 – November 17, 2024), colloquially known as "Apóstolo (Note: Or, in English, Apostle) Rina" or "AP", who also served as the church's president from its inception until his controversial suspension in June 2024 due to accusations of domestic violence.

Unlike most churches, its initial goal was to appeal to a young, informal audience, focusing on (but not limited to) enthusiasts of the surf culture. The church also seeks to maintain its image associated with the practice of extreme sports such as surfing, skateboarding, running and cycling, among others, and many of its temples have decorations inspired by such sports. As of 2024, Bola de Neve has over 560 temples and cells both in Brazil and in other 34 countries around the world, and has attracted celebrities such as surfer Gabriel Medina, actors Fernanda Vasconcellos, Guilherme Berenguer and Monique Evans, politicians Alexandre Frota and Cabo Daciolo, gymnast Diego Hypólito, former Charlie Brown Jr. drummer Renato Pelado, and television presenter Yudi Tamashiro.

== History ==
Bola de Neve's founder, Rinaldo Luiz de Seixas Pereira, better known as Apóstolo Rina, was born in São Paulo on April 15, 1972, to Lídia Colomietz and Rinaldo "Bolinha" Pereira. The oldest son of two sisters, he hailed from an Evangelical family and studied at the Colégio Batista Brasileiro in the bairro of Perdizes.

In 1993, after being diagnosed with a life-threatening case of hepatitis, he claimed to have had a "supernatural experience" with God, subsequently dedicating himself to the teachings of Jesus and becoming a helper at a Reborn in Christ Church site. By the next year, he began promoting small reunions at his house, what later influenced him to open his own church he would name "Bola de Neve", or "Snowball" – according to him, the name came to him in a dream and symbolizes a metaphor alluding to a snowball growing bigger and bigger until becoming an avalanche.

Bola de Neve as a stand-alone church wouldn't be officially formed until 1999, with its first meetings happening at a surfshop in Brás. Without any table or pulpit available to support the Bible, however, Rina was forced to use a surfboard, what would become Bola de Neve's trademark. By January 2000 they had acquired their own building at Rua Marco Aurélio in Lapa; in 2004 they moved to a larger site at Rua Turiassu, in Perdizes, and in 2010 their most recent headquarters was inaugurated at Rua Clélia, once again in Lapa.

From June 2024 Rina had been away from his duties as Bola de Neve's leader due to allegations of domestic violence by his stepson, Nathan Gouvêa, and his wife, gospel singer and the church's vice president Denise Seixas, who later obtained a restraining order against him. A court order also forced Rina to deliver any firearms in his possession to the police. On November 17, 2024, while returning from an event in São João da Boa Vista, Rina, aged 52, died in a traffic collision near Campinas after losing control of his motorcycle. Shortly after his death, Fábio Santos took Rina's place as the church's interim president, leading Denise to sue Santos over the church's leadership due to supposed irregularities in the succession process. She eventually took over Bola de Neve's leadership on December 18, 2024.
