= Marcelo Freixo =

Brazilian politician and teacher

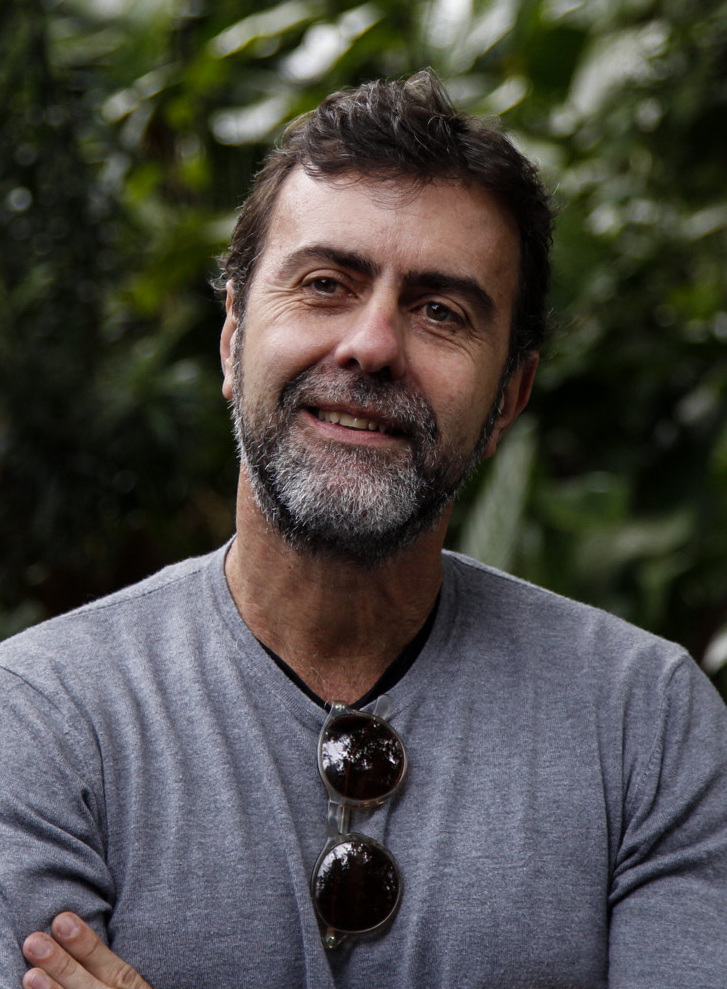
- Freixo in 2022

Chair of the Brazilian Tourist Board
- In office 12 January 2023 – 31 March 2026
- President: Luiz Inácio Lula da Silva
- Minister: Daniela Carneiro; Celso Sabino; Gustavo Feliciano
- Preceded by: Gilson Machado Neto
- Succeeded by: Bruno Reis

Member-elect of the Chamber of Deputies
- Assuming office 1 February 2027
- Constituency: Rio de Janeiro
- In office 1 February 2019 – 12 January 2023
- Constituency: Rio de Janeiro

Member of the Legislative Assembly of Rio de Janeiro
- In office 1 January 2007 – 1 January 2019
- Constituency: At-large

Personal details
- Born: Marcelo Ribeiro Freixo; 12 April 1967 (age 59) São Gonçalo, Rio de Janeiro, Brazil
- Party: PT (1986–2005, 2023–present)
- Other political affiliations: PSOL (2005–2021); PSB (2021–2023)
- Spouse: Antonia Pellegrino (m. 2019)
- Children: 2
- Education: Fluminense Federal University (BA)
- Profession: Historian; politician; teacher; television presenter

Marcelo Ribeiro Freixo ([maʁˈsɛlu ʁiˈbejɾu ˈfɾejʃu]) is a Brazilian politician and teacher affiliated to the Workers' Party (PT). He had served as a federal deputy for the Brazilian Socialist Party (PSB), and was formerly chairman of the Defence of Human Rights and Citizenship Commission on the Rio de Janeiro Legislative Assembly.

Freixo gained national attention when he presided over a parliamentary inquiry commission on police militias in Rio de Janeiro, having a character inspired on him in the Brazilian film Elite Squad: The Enemy Within, directed by José Padilha.

He ran for mayor of Rio de Janeiro twice, in 2012 and 2016, having as vice-mayor candidate on the ticket in 2016 the lawyer and professor at UFRJ Luciana Boiteux. He ended in second in both the run-offs, losing the first to Eduardo Paes from PMDB, and the second to the PRB candidate Marcelo Crivella.

On 16 June 2021, Freixo left PSOL for PSB, in preparation for the 2022 Rio de Janeiro gubernatorial election. He left the Brazilian Socialist Party (PSB) and joined the Workers' Party (PT) in January 2023.

Government offices
Preceded by Gilson Machado Neto	Chair of the Brazilian Tourist Board; 2023–2026	Succeeded by Bruno Reis
