= Fernando Mac Dowell =

Brazilian engineer and politician (1945–2018)

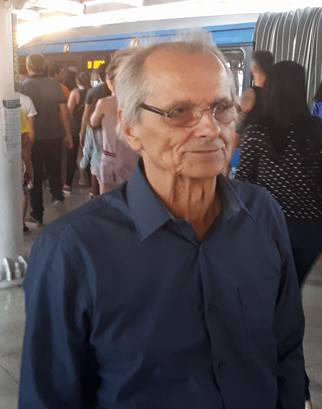

Vice Mayor of Rio de Janeiro
- In office 1 January 2017 – 20 May 2018
- Mayor: Marcelo Crivella
- Preceded by: Adilson Pires
- Succeeded by: Nilton Caldeira

Personal details
- Born: Fernando Luiz Cumplido Mac Dowell da Costa; 7 July 1945 Rio de Janeiro, Brazil
- Died: 20 May 2018 (aged 72) Hospital Vitória, Barra da Tijuca, Brazil
- Party: PR (2010–18)
- Profession: Engineer

Fernando Luiz Cumplido Mac Dowell da Costa (July 7, 1945 – May 20, 2018) was a Brazilian engineer and politician. He worked for several governments in Brazil and advocated for urbanism in Rio de Janeiro. He was critical of Rio de Janeiro's transport system during the government of Sérgio Cabral.

== Career ==
Mac Dowell worked at GEIPOT, a transportation company founded in 1965. He graduated with an engineering degree from the University of the State of Rio de Janeiro (UERJ) in 1969 and subsequently became a professor there. In the 1980s, he was director of the Carioca subway when the first line began running during the term of governor Chagas Freitas. He was the president of Empresa de Obras Públicas/Emop during the government of Moreira Franco and was considered a potential candidate to succeed Franco. However, he claimed to have broken with Franco because the government allegedly attempted to prematurely inaugurate the Viaduto do Joa.

From 1991 to 1994, he participated in the second government of Leonel Brizola as a defender of the subway system. During this time, he participated in the construction of the Red Line. He critiqued Brazil's subway systems, stating in 2009 that "metro in Brazil only exists in São Paulo, Rio and Distrito Federal." He also criticized the expansion of the subway during the government of Sérgio Cabral. In 2015, he visited "ghost stations" that had been ready since the 1980s but were never inaugurated.

Mac Dowell joined the Liberal Party (PL) in the 2010s and was elected as the vice mayor of Rio de Janeiro in the 2016 elections, as the running mate of Marcelo Crivella.

== Death ==
Mac Dowell died on May 20, 2018, at the age of 72, from a heart attack and complications resulting from an extensive acute myocardial infarction. The mayor of Rio de Janeiro decreed an official mourning period of three days after his death. The Lagoa–Barra Highway in Rio de Janeiro was renamed the Engenheiro Fernando Mac Dowell Highway ("engenheiro" is the Portuguese word for "engineer").

Political offices
Preceded by Adilson Pires	Vice Mayor of Rio de Janeiro; 2017–2018	Vacant Title next held by Nilton Caldeira
