= Marcelo Itagiba =

Brazilian politician (born 1956)

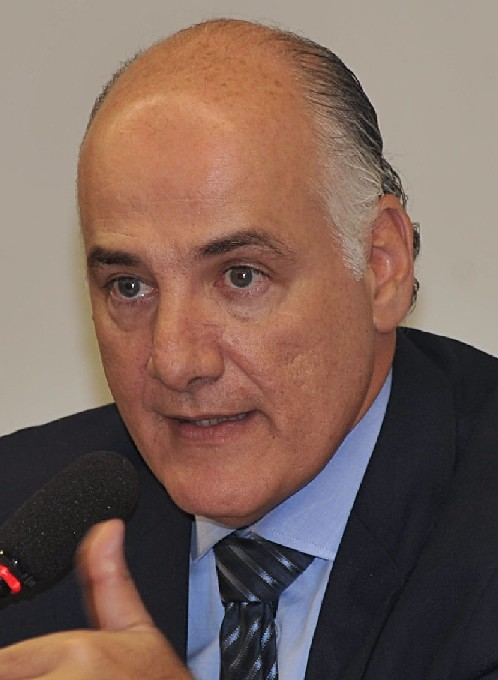

Member of the Chamber of Deputies
- In office 1 February 2007 – 1 February 2011
- Constituency: Rio de Janeiro

State Secretary of Public Security of Rio de Janeiro
- In office 3 December 2004 – 30 March 2006
- Governor: Rosinha Garotinho
- Preceded by: Anthony Garotinho
- Succeeded by: Roberto Precioso Júnior

Personal details
- Born: 20 March 1956 (age 70) Rio de Janeiro, DF, Brazil
- Party: Avante (2022–present)
- Other political affiliations: MDB (2003–09); PSDB (2009–18); Cidadania (2018–22)

Marcelo Zaturansky Nogueira Itagiba (born 20 March 1956) is a Brazilian politician.

Itagiba was the Brazilian Federal Police superintendent, secretary of public security of the Rio de Janeiro State during Rosinha Matheus' government in that State. In 2006, he was elected as a Federal Deputy, representing the State of Rio de Janeiro at the Chamber of Deputies of Brazil.
