= Filippe Poubel =

Brazilian politician (born 1981)

- Poubel in 2022

Member-elect of the Chamber of Deputies
- Assuming office 1 February 2027
- Constituency: Rio de Janeiro

Member of the Legislative Assembly of Rio de Janeiro
- Incumbent
- Assumed office 1 February 2019
- Constituency: At-large

Councillor of Maricá
- In office 1 January 2017 – 1 February 2019
- Constituency: At-large

Personal details
- Born: Filippe Medeiros Poubel; 26 April 1981 (age 45) Niterói, Rio de Janeiro, Brazil
- Party: Liberal Party (2013–2016, 2022–present)
- Other political affiliations: PTN (2011); PSD (2011–2013); DEM (2016–2018); PSL (2018–2022); UNIÃO (2022)
- Children: Poubel Filho

Filippe Medeiros Poubel (born 26 April 1981) is a Brazilian politician who was elected member of the Chamber of Deputies in 2026. He has been a member of the Legislative Assembly of Rio de Janeiro since 2019, and has served as group leader of the Liberal Party since 2024. He is the father of Poubel Filho.
