= Marcelo Crivella =

Brazilian politician and pentecostal leader

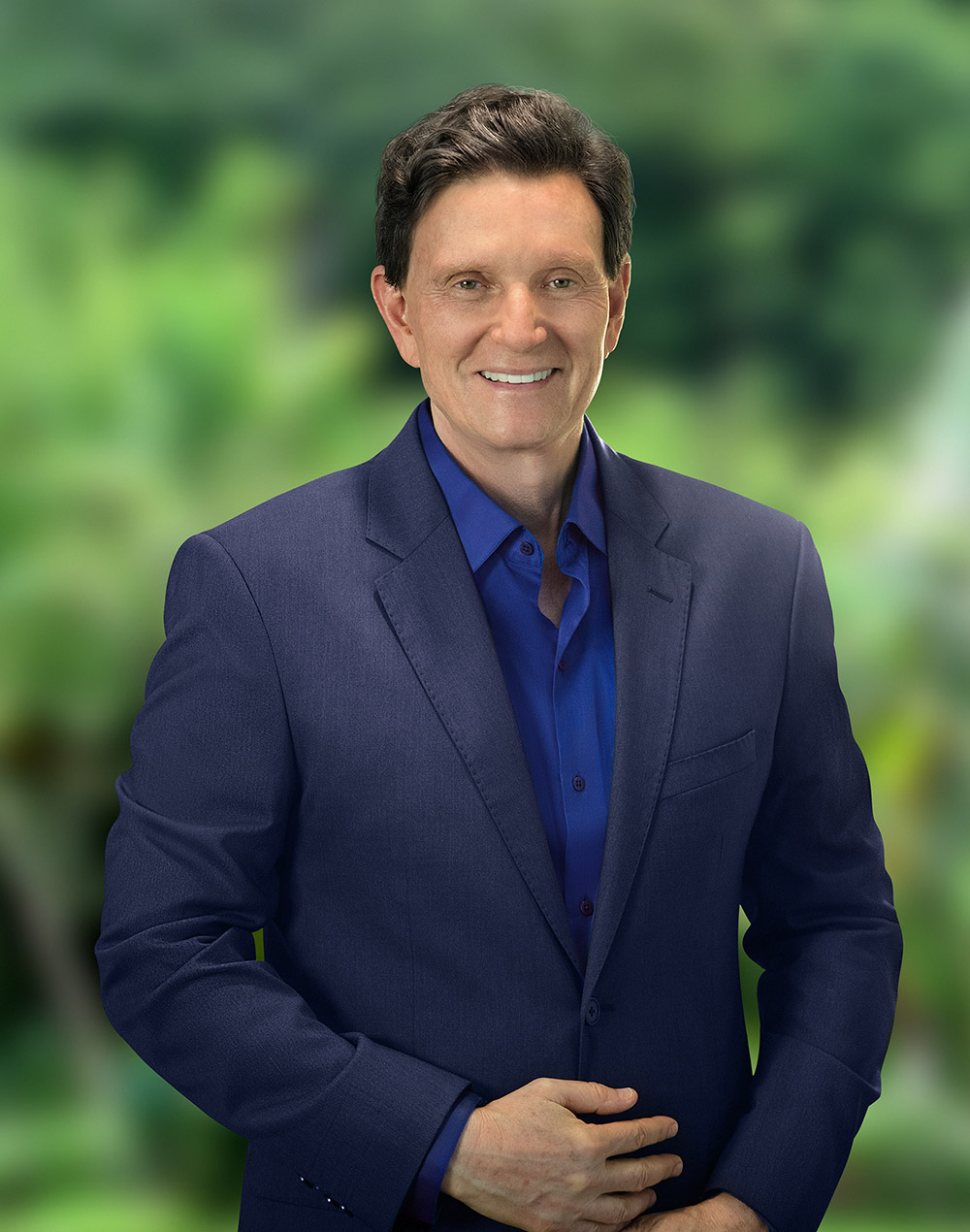
- Crivella in 2017

Federal Deputy
- Incumbent
- Assumed office 1 February 2023
- Constituency: Rio de Janeiro

Mayor of Rio de Janeiro
- In office 1 January 2017 – 31 December 2020 (Note: Suspended from office from 22 December 2020 to 31 December 2020. As consequence, the President of the Municipal Chamber took office as interim Mayor until the inauguration of Mayor-elect Eduardo Paes.)
- Vice Mayor: Fernando Mac Dowell (2017–2018); Vacant (2018–2021)
- Preceded by: Eduardo Paes
- Succeeded by: Eduardo Paes

Senator for Rio de Janeiro
- In office 1 February 2003 – 31 December 2016

Minister of Fishing and Aquaculture
- In office 2 March 2012 – 17 March 2014
- President: Dilma Rousseff
- Preceded by: Nóbrega de Oliveira
- Succeeded by: Eduardo Lopes

Personal details
- Born: Marcelo Bezerra Crivella; 9 October 1957 (age 69) Rio de Janeiro, Federal District, Brazil
- Party: Republicanos (2005–present)
- Other political affiliations: PL (2002–2005)
- Spouse: Sylvia Jane Hodge (m. 1980)
- Children: 3
- Education: Santa Ursula University (B.E.)
- Occupation: Pentecostal pastor, politician
- Profession: Engineer
- Website: www.marcelocrivella.com.br

Religious life
- Religion: Christian
- Denomination: Neopentecostal
- Church: Universal Church of the Kingdom of God

Marcelo Bezerra Crivella (Portuguese pronunciation: [maʁˈsɛlu biˈzeʁɐ kɾiˈvɛlɐ]; born 9 October 1957) is a Brazilian Evangelical pastor, gospel singer and politician. He served as the mayor of the city of Rio de Janeiro from 1 January 2017 until 31 December 2020. In the 2020 election, Crivella ran for a second term but lost to Eduardo Paes in each of the city's 49 constituencies.

In 2002, Crivella was elected as a federal Senator of Brazil from the state of Rio de Janeiro on the Liberal Party ticket. He has since helped found the Brazilian Republican Party (PRB) which has been allied with President Luiz Inácio Lula da Silva.

With a Civil Engineering degree from Universidade Santa Ursula, Crivella became known for planning and execution of the Projeto Nordeste, a charitable project to redevelop lands abandoned by the Brazilian federal government in the city of Irecê. The project was developed to use Israeli irrigation practices, which Crivella has observed in his several trips to Israel. It has led to the renewal of agriculture and livestock raising there.

He is a bishop of the Universal Church of the Kingdom of God (UCKG), an international evangelical church founded by his uncle Edir Macedo in 1977.

== Early life ==
Born in Rio de Janeiro to Catholic parents, Crivella attended the Methodist Church in his youth. His connection with his uncle, Edir Macedo, made them try an unsuccessful commercial partnership, before he was invited in 1977 to work in Macedo's newly founded UCKG. He studied at Santa Ursula University in Civil Engineering and obtained a Bachelor of Science in 1984. Soon Crivella became a pastor.

== Religious career ==
In 1992, he became a missionary pastor in South Africa for the universal Church, until 2002. He became pastor and bishop, having worked ten years diffusing the Universal Church in the African continent.

In 1999 he was part of an event at the Maracana sports stadium in Rio de Janeiro.

By 1999, he had signed a contract with Sony Records. His religious preaching is broadcast by radio. Crivella has recorded as a singer, often using his own songs. He has released 14 disks, selling more than 5 million copies. His biggest success was his first album, O Mensageiro da Solidariedade (The Messenger of Solidarity). The albums were recorded by Line Records and by Sony Music.

Crivella is the author of the books Histórias de Sabedoria e Humildade, a collection of moral and religious tales, Um Sonho que se Tornou Realidade, which is about the Projeto Nordeste, and “Evangelizando a África,” a book he wrote during his 10 years he spent in Africa as a missionary. He is considered a preacher of the prosperity gospel.

== Political career ==
Marcelo Crivella entered political life, being a founder of the Brazilian Republican Party (PRB), and ran successfully for the position of Senator in the 2002 elections. In 2003, he became senator for the State of Rio de Janeiro until 2017.

In 2006 Crivella ran for governor of Rio de Janeiro state. He ran for mayor of the capital in 2004 and 2008, but was unsuccessful in the three races. In 2004 he came in second in the disputed Rio de Janeiro municipal election, but he did not succeed to go to the second round against César Maia. He complained about negative coverage by O Globo newspaper, owned by the second-largest media conglomerate in the country, which published several articles accusing him of fraud.

In 2006, he was gubernatorial candidate for the state of Rio de Janeiro, and was supported by the President Luiz Inácio Lula da Silva. Polls put him in second place, but he was beaten by Denise Frossard, the candidate of the PPS, and Crivella declined to participate in the runoff election.

In 2008, he ran for mayor of the state capital, but came in 3rd place in the first round and was eliminated.

Crivella reached the second round but was defeated on his running for Governor of Rio de Janeiro in 2014 by Luiz Fernando Pezão.

=== Mayor of Rio de Janeiro ===
In 2016, Marcelo Crivella won the election for Rio de Janeiro Mayor beating left-wing candidate Marcelo Freixo by about 20 percentage points. He is the first Pentecostal to govern a big Brazilian city.

As mayor of Rio de Janeiro, Crivella called the Carnival of Rio de Janeiro, which is rooted in the afro-Brazilian religions, an "unchristian excess" and ordered severe financial cuts for the organizers.

=== Arrest ===
On 22 December 2020, just nine days before the end of his term as mayor, Crivella was arrested at his home in Rio de Janeiro, after investigations on a kickback corruption scheme during his administration. Because his vice mayor, Fernando Mac Dowell, died in 2018, the president of the Municipal Chamber of Rio de Janeiro, Jorge Felippe, became interim mayor.

== Parliamentary conduct ==
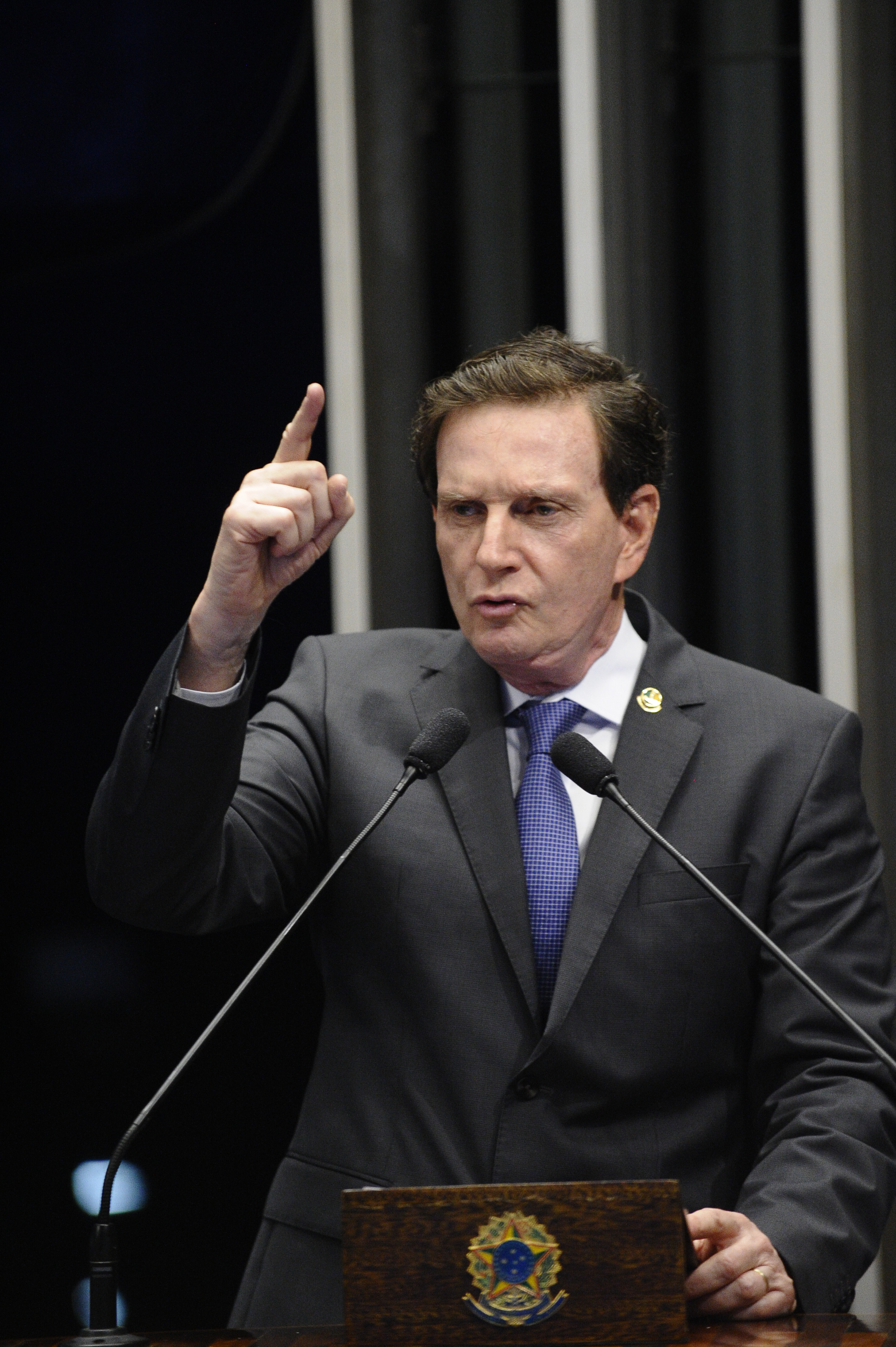
Senator Crivella speaks in the Federal Senate in May 2015

In the Brazilian Senate, Crivella established himself as a representative of the Brazilian diaspora, as many citizens are working abroad. He was president of the Subcomissão Permanente de Proteção dos Cidadãos Brasileiros no Exterior (Permanent Subcommittee on Protection of Brazilian Citizens Abroad), subject to the Comissão de Relações Exteriores e Defesa Nacional (Committee on Foreign Relations and National Defense), of which Crivella was vice president. As an example, he led efforts to gain better treatment of Brazilians picked up in the United States as illegal immigrants. As policy, they are detained while their cases are being reviewed, which can be lengthy.

=== Personal views ===
Crivella identifies as a conservative politician but he has been a great ally of President Lula. His party supports the government. Crivella opposes the legalization of abortion. Crivella favors public policies for family planning through sex education and sterilization, and the Law on Biosafety, which regulates research with stem cells.

He opposes civil unions for homosexuals and the codification of homophobia. After protests by activists, he explained that he feared unintended consequences of a proposed law against homophobia, but certainly wants protections and equal rights for homosexuals.

Veja magazine had a cover story about the influence of Charles Darwin, who developed the theory of evolution. In an interview, Crivella said that he is a creationist and rejects this theory. The Senator said "there is no conclusive proofs that [...] one species could generate another species".

In September 2019, the mayor of Rio de Janeiro, Marcelo Crivella, sparked controversy by ordering the organizers of the Book Biennial to remove the 2010 work Avengers: The Children's Crusade from the shelves. According to him, the Marvel comic book offered "sexual content for minors," referring to a single illustration of a kiss between the male characters Wiccan and Hulkling. As a result, the comic book in question sold out at all stands the following morning in less than forty minutes after the Biennial opened, and the illustration targeted by the attacks became the cover of the newspaper Folha de S.Paulo in its very edition of September 7th. Also in response to the mayor's action, YouTuber Felipe Neto bought the complete stock of all LGBT+-themed titles available at the event (about fourteen thousand copies) and used a sales promoter to distribute them for free to the public present in the Biennial's central square, also on the 7th.

== Criticism ==
He has been criticized for his 1999 book Evangelizing Africa in which he said that homosexuality was a "terrible evil", that Catholics were demonic, that African religions were based on "evil spirits", and that Hindus drank their children's blood. He has since tried to distance himself from the book, saying that it was the work of a young, immature missionary.

== Notes ==
Political offices
Preceded by Nóbrega de Oliveira	Minister of Fishing and Aquaculture; 2012–2014	Succeeded by Eduardo Lopes
Preceded by Eduardo Paes	Mayor of Rio de Janeiro; 2017–2020	Succeeded by Jorge Felippe (interim)
