= 2014 Rio de Janeiro gubernatorial election =

Brazilian state election

- October 26, 2014 (second round)
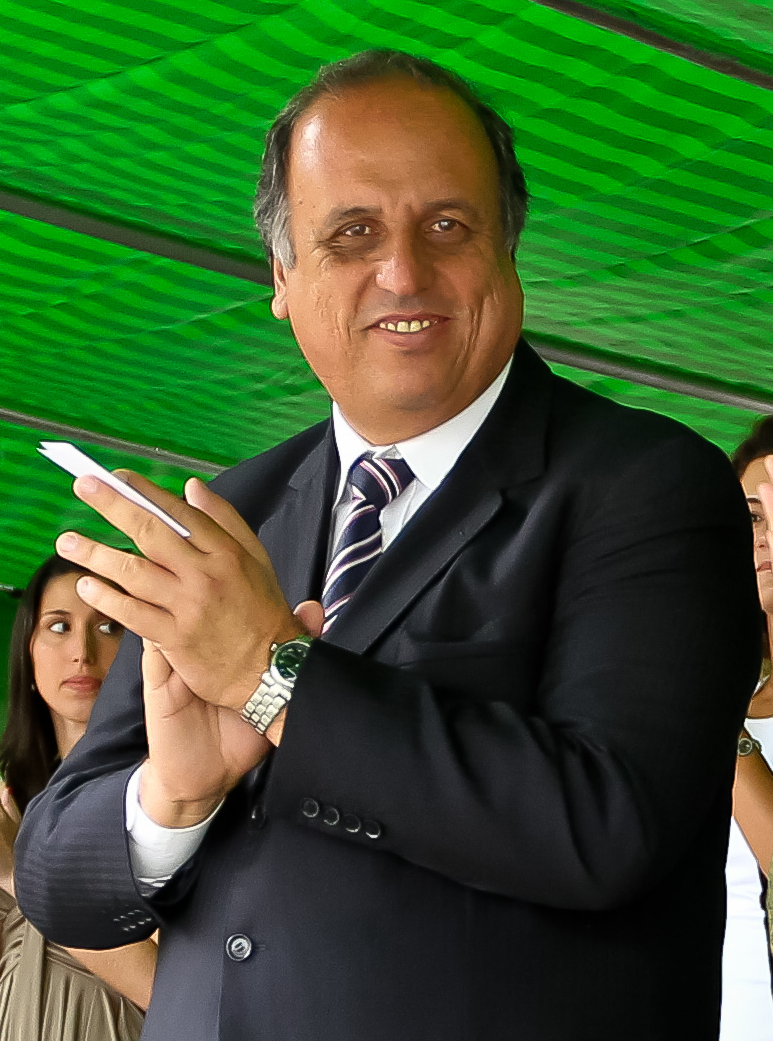

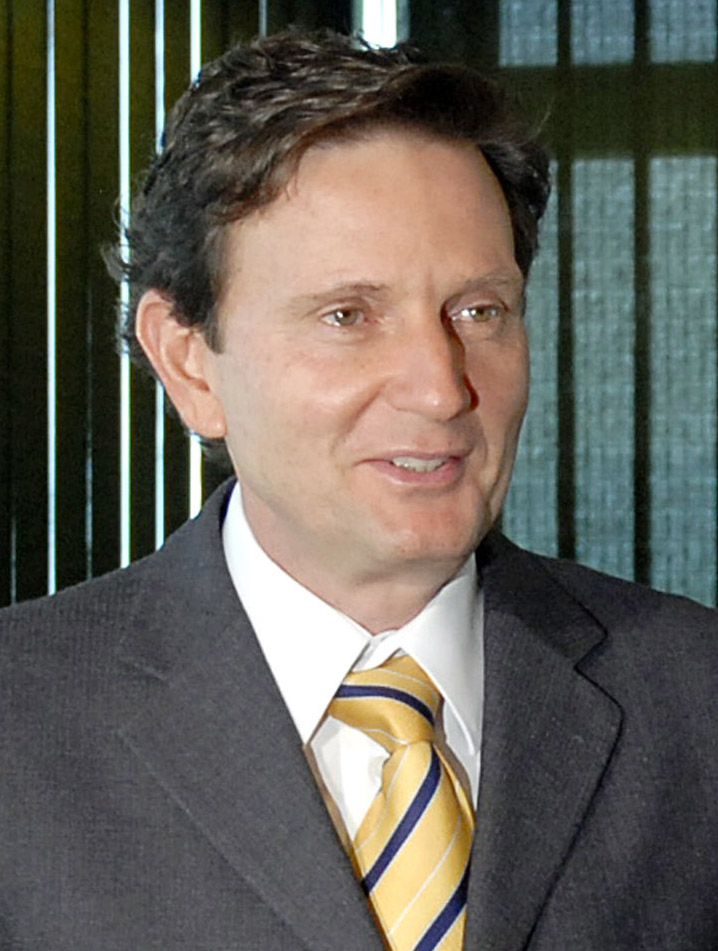
Nominee	Luiz Fernando Pezão	Marcelo Crivella
Party	PMDB	Republicanos
Running mate	Francisco Dornelles	General Abreu
Popular vote	4,343,298	3,442,713
Percentage	55.78%	44.22%
Governor before election
Luiz Fernando Pezão
MDB
Elected Governor
Luiz Fernando Pezão
MDB

2014 Rio de Janeiro senate election
- October 5, 2014
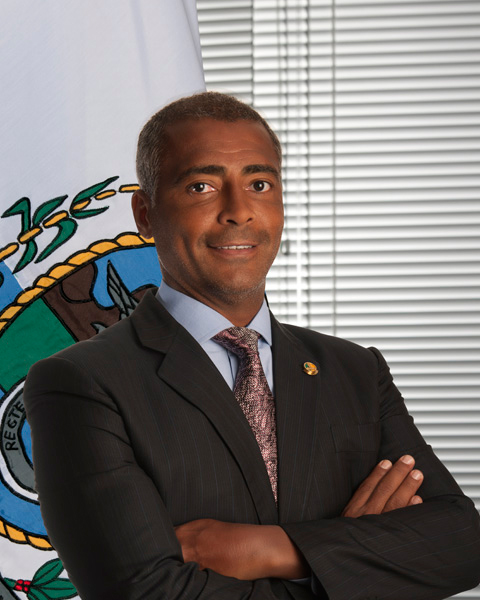

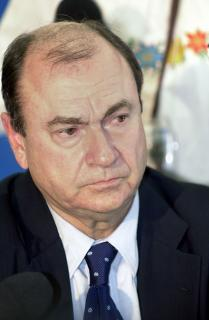
Nominee	Romário Faria	César Maia
Party	PSB	DEM
Popular vote	4,683,963	1,514,737
Percentage	64.43%	20.51%
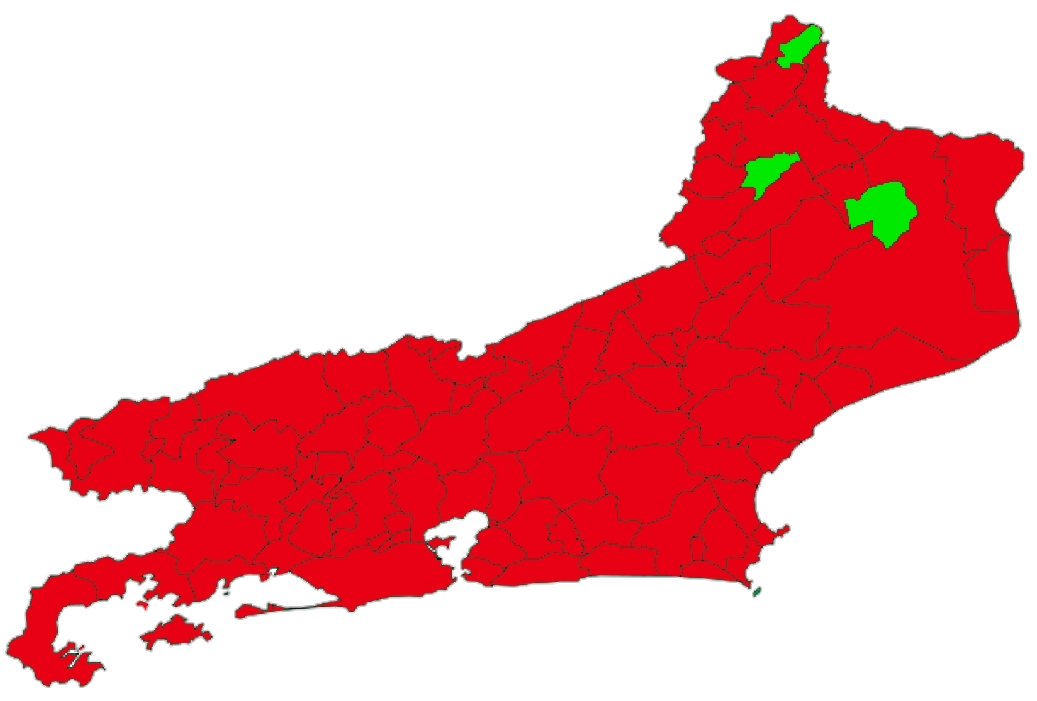
Senator before election
Francisco Dornelles
MDB
Elected Senator
Romário Faria
PSB

The Rio de Janeiro gubernatorial election was held on 5 October 2014 to elect the next governor of the state of Rio de Janeiro. Since no candidate received more than 50% of the vote, a second-round runoff election was held on the 26th of October. Incumbent Governor Luiz Fernando Pezão, who was running for his first full term, was forced into the runoff against Marcelo Crivella but ultimately won.

== Campaign ==
On December 2, 2013, Governor Sergio Cabral Filho announced he would be stepping down as Governor on March 31, 2014 in order to pursue an ultimately-unlaunched bid for the Brazilian Senate. With his election in 2010, Cabral enjoyed high approval ratings until the 2013 protests in Brazil severely damaged his popularity. Following Cabral's resignation, Vice Governor Luiz Fernando Pezão succeeded him and announced his intent to run in the 2014 election.

Other candidates had launched their candidacies prior to Cabral's resignation: former Governor Anthony Garotinho of the Republic Party in April 2012 and Senator Lindberg Farias of the PT in November 2012.

=== Runoff endorsements ===
On October 7, Marcelo Crivella received an endorsement from third place candidate Anthony Garotinho. He also received endorsements from fourth place finisher Lindberg Farias and the state branch of the Workers Party (PT) in an announcement made by state party president Washington Quaquá. The PT, however is divided in this decision. Nine of the ten PT mayors in the state are supporting Pezão, the exception being Quaquá (Mayor of Maricá). PT supporters of Pezão include Niterói Mayor Rodrigo Neves and State Deputy Carlos Minc.

On October 12, Luiz Fernando Pezão received the endorsement of newly elected Senator Romário, while the state branch of the PSB decided to not endorse either candidate.

== Candidates ==
=== Governor ===
No.	Governor	Vice-governor	Coalition
10	Marcelo Crivella (PRB)	General Abreu (PRB)	-
13	Lindbergh Farias (PT)	Roberto Rocco (PV)	"Popular Front"; PT, PV, PSB, PCdoB
15	Luiz Fernando Pezão (PMDB)	Francisco Dornelles (PP)	"Rio in First Place"; PMDB, PP, DEM, PSD, PSC, PSDB, PPS, PSL, SD, PHS, PTN, PSDC, PMN, PTC, PRP, PRTB, PPL, PEN, PTB
16	Dayse Oliveira (PSTU)	Marília Macedo (PSTU)	-
21	Ney Nunes (PCB)	Heitor César (PCB)	-
22	Anthony Garotinho (PR)	Márcio Garcia (PR)	"Republican and Labor Alliance"; PR, PROS, PTdoB
50	Tarcísio Motta (PSOL)	Renatão do Quilombo (PSOL)	-

=== Senator ===
No.	Senator	Coalition
100	Diplomat Sebastião Neves (PRB)	-
123	Carlos Lupi (PDT)	-
161	Heitor Fernandes (PSTU)	-
211	Eduardo Serra (PCB)	-
255	César Maia (DEM)	"Rio in First Place"; PMDB, PP, DEM, PSD, PSC, PSDB, PPS, PSL, SD, PHS, PTN, PSDC, PMN, PTC, PRP, PRTB, PPL, PEN, PTB
400	Romário Faria (PSB)	"Popular Front"; PT, PV, PSB, PCdoB
500	Pedro Rosa (PSOL)	-
901	Líliam Sá (PROS)	"Republican and Labor Alliance"; PR, PROS, PTdoB

== Opinion polling ==
Date	Institute	Candidate							Blank/Null/Undecided
Date	Institute	Luiz Fernando Pezão (PMDB)	Anthony Garotinho (PR)	Marcelo Crivella (PRB)	Lindbergh Farias (PT)	Tarcisio Motta (PSOL)	Dayse Oliveira (PSTU)	Ney Nunes (PCB)	Blank/Null/Undecided
September 25–26, 2014	Datafolha	31%	23%	17%	12%	2%	1%	-	14%
September 20–22, 2014	Ibope	29%	26%	17%	8%	2%	1%	-	17%
September 8–9, 2014	Datafolha	25%	25%	19%	12%	2%	1%	0%	16%
September 5–8, 2014	Ibope	25%	26%	17%	9%	2%	0%	0%	20%
September 2–3, 2014	Datafolha	23%	28%	18%	11%	3%	1%	0%	16%
August 30–September 1, 2014	Ibope	19%	27%	17%	11%	3%	1%	0%	22%
August 23–25, 2014	Ibope	18%	28%	16%	12%	3%	1%	1%	21%
August 12–13, 2014	Datafolha	16%	25%	18%	12%	1%	1%	1%	27%
July 26–August 2, 2014	Gerp	13%	25%	23%	11%	1%	1%	1%	25%
July 26–28, 2014	Ibope	15%	21%	16%	11%	1%	2%	1%	33%
July 15–16, 2014	Datafolha	14%	24%	24%	12%	2%	1%	-	23%

== Results ==
=== Governor ===
Candidate	Running mate	Total	Percentage
Luiz Fernando Pezão (PMDB)	Francisco Dornelles (PP)	3,242,513	40.57%
Marcelo Crivella (PRB)	General Abreu (PRB)	1,619,165	20.26%
Anthony Garotinho (PR)	Márcio Garcia (PR)	1,576,511	19.73%
Lindbergh Farias (PT)	Roberto Rocco (PV)	798,897	10,00%
Tarcísio Motta (PSOL)	Renatão do Quilombo (PSOL)	712,734	8.92%
Dayse Oliveira (PSTU)	Marília Macedo (PSTU)	33,442	0.42%
Ney Nunes (PCB)	Heitor César (PCB)	8,950	0.11%
Valid votes		7,992,212	82.45%
Blank votes		592,999	6.12%
Null votes		1,108,651	11.44%
Turnout		9,693,862	79.89%
Abstention		2,440,581	20.11%

Second round

Candidate	Running mate	Total	Percentage
Luiz Fernando Pezão (PMDB)	Francisco Dornelles (PP)	4,343,298	55.78%
Marcelo Crivella (PRB)	General Abreu (PRB)	3,442,713	44.22%
Valid votes		7,786,011	82.64%
Blank votes		319,823	3.39%
Null votes		1,315,356	13.97%
Turnout		9,421,190	77.64%
Abstention		2,713,771	22.36%

Elected

=== Senator ===
Candidate	Total	Percentage
Romário Faria (PSB)	4,683,963	63.43%
César Maia (DEM)	1,514,727	20.51%
Liliam Sá (PROS)	507,872	6.88%
Diplomat Sebastião Neves (PRB)	301,162	4.08%
Carlos Lupi (PDT)	228,086	3.09%
Pedro Rosa (PSOL)	137,652	1.86%
Eduardo Serra (PCB)	39,201	0.53%
Heitor Fernandes (PSTU)	11,444	0.15%
Valid votes	7,992,212	82.45%
Blank votes	592,999	6.12%
Null votes	1,108,651	11.43%
Turnout	9,693,862	79.89%
Abstention	2,440,581	20.11%

Elected

=== Elected Federal Deputies ===
A total of forty-six (46) Federal Deputies were elected from the state of Rio de Janeiro.

Candidate	Votes
Jair Bolsonaro (PP)	464,572
Clarissa Garotinho (PR)	335,061
Eduardo Cunha (PMDB)	232,708
Chico Alencar (PSOL)	195,964
Leonardo Picciani (PMDB)	180,741
Pedro Paulo (PMDB)	162,403
Jean Wyllys (PSOL)	144,770
Roberto Sales (PRB)	124,087
Marco Antônio Cabral (PMDB)	119,584
Otavio Leite (PSDB)	106,398
Felipe Bornier (PSD)	105,517
Sóstenes Cavalcante (PSD)	104,697
Washington Reis (PMDB)	103,190
Rosângela Gomes (PRB)	101,686
Júlio Lopes (PP)	96,796
Índio da Costa (PSD)	91,523
Alessandro Molon (PT)	87,003
Hugo Leal (PROS)	85,449
Glauber Braga (PSB)	82,236
Cristiane Brasil (PTB)	81,617
Jandira Feghali (PCdoB)	68,531
Dr. João (PR)	65,624
Simão Sessim (PP)	58,825
Celso Pansera (PMDB)	58,534
Miro Teixeira (PROS)	58,409
Aureo (SD)	58,117
Sergio Zveiter (PSD)	57,587
Arolde de Oliveira (PSD)	55,380
Rodrigo Maia (DEM)	53,167
Chico d'Ângelo (PT)	52,809
Cabo Daciolo (PSOL)	49,831
Luiz Sérgio (PT)	48,903
Alexandre Serfiotis (PSD)	48,879
Deley (PTB)	48,874
Soraya Santos (PMDB)	48,204
Benedita da Silva (PT)	48,163
Paulo Feijó (PR)	48,058
Marcelo Matos (PDT)	47,370
Fernando Jordão (PMDB)	47,188
Francisco Floriano (PR)	47,157
Marcos Soares (PR)	44,440
Altineu Cortes (PR)	40,593
Fabiano Horta (PT)	37,989
Ezequiel Teixeira (SD)	35,701
Luiz Carlos Ramos do Chapéu (PSDC)	33,221
Alexandre Valle (PRP)	26,526

=== Elected State Deputies ===
A total of seventy (70) state deputies were elected from the state of Rio de Janeiro.

Candidate	Votes
Marcelo Freixo _{(PSOL)}	350,408
Wagner Montes _{(PSD)}	208,814
Flávio Bolsonaro _{(PP)}	160,359
Samuel Malafaia _{(PSD)}	140,148
Paulo Melo _{(PMDB)}	125,391
Nivaldo Mulim _{(PR)}	93,192
Fábio Silva _{(PMDB)}	82,168
André Corrêa _{(PSD)}	81,364
Jorge Picciani _{(PMDB)}	76,590
Cidinha Campos _{(PDT)}	75,492
Dionísio Lins _{(PP)}	75,405
Pedro Fernandes Neto _{(SD)}	75,366
Tia Ju _{(PRB)}	74,803
Carlos Osorio _{(PMDB)}	70,835
Domingos Brazão _{(PMDB)}	70,314
Lucinha _{(PSDB)}	65,760
Gustavo Tutuca _{(PMDB)}	64,248
Rafael Picciani _{(PMDB)}	63,073
Carlos Macedo _{(PRB)}	62,088
Edson Albertassi _{(PMDB)}	61,549
Bebeto _{(SD)}	61,082
Zeidan _{(PT)}	60,810
Bernardo Rossi _{(PMDB)}	56,806
Daniele Guerreiro _{(PMDB)}	55,821
Waguinho _{(PMDB)}	53,835
Martha Rocha _{(PSD)}	52,698
Márcio Pacheco _{(PSC)}	50,344
Christino Áureo _{(PSD)}	50,168
Doutor Deodalto _{(PTN)}	48,496
Pedro Augusto _{(PMDB)}	48,345
André Lazaroni _{(PMDB)}	44,473
Benedito Alves _{(PMDB)}	44,381
Rosenverg Reis _{(PMDB)}	43,045
Thiago Pampolha _{(PTC)}	41,897
Luiz Paulo _{(PSDB)}	39,992
Carlos Minc _{(PT)}	39,865
Luiz Martins _{(PDT)}	39,309
Marcus Vinícius Neskau _{(PTB)}	39,192
Filipe Soares _{(PR)}	39,058
Carlos Alberto Lavrado Cupello _{(SD)}	38,851
Farid Abrahão David _{(PTB)}	38,342
Iranildo Campos _{(PSD)}	36,914
Waldeck _{(PT)}	36,755
José Luiz Nanci _{(PPS)}	36,356
Comte Bittencourt _{(PPS)}	36,155
Bruno Dauaire _{(PR)}	35,645
Marcia Jeovani _{(PR)}	34,870
Márcio Canella _{(PSL)}	34,495
Rogério Lisboa _{(PR)}	34,030
Nurse Rejane _{(PCdoB)}	33,990
Jorge Felippe Neto _{(PSD)}	32,066
João Peixoto _{(PSDC)}	31,243
André Ceciliano _{(PT)}	31,207
Doctor Sadinoel _{(PT)}	30,504
Zaqueu _{(PT)}	30,304
Milton Rangel _{(PSD)}	28,957
Marcos Abrahão _{(PTdoB)}	28,777
Jair Bittencourt _{(PR)}	28,133
Jânio Mendes _{(PDT)}	28,012
Renato Cozzolino _{(PR)}	26,697
Átila Nunes Filho _{(PSL)}	25,042
Zito _{(PP)}	24,491
Wanderson Nogueira _{(PSB)}	20,073
Paulo Ramos _{(PSOL)}	18,732
José Luiz Anchite _{(PP)}	17,401
Graça Pereira _{(PRTB)}	16,876
Flávio Serafini _{(PSOL)}	16,117
Eliomar Coelho _{(PSOL)}	14,144
Marcos Miller _{(PHS)}	12,929
Doctor Julianelli _{(PSOL)}	11,805
