= Marco Antônio Cabral =

Brazilian lawyer and politician

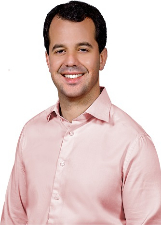
- Marco in 2022.

Federal Deputy for Rio de Janeiro
- In office February 1, 2015 – February 1, 2019

Personal details
- Born: Marco Antônio Neves Cabral; 7 May 1991 (age 35) Rio de Janeiro, Brazil
- Party: Solidarity (2026–present)
- Other political affiliations: Brazilian Democratic Movement (1999–2026)
- Spouse: Jessica Gargioni Cabral
- Parents: Sérgio Cabral Filho (father); Susana Neves (mother)
- Education: Pontifical Catholic University of Rio de Janeiro

Marco Antônio Neves Cabral (born May 7, 1991) is a Brazilian lawyer and politician affiliated to the Brazilian Democratic Movement (MDB). He was a federal deputy for Rio de Janeiro between 2015 and 2019.

== Early life and education ==
The grandson of journalist and music researcher Sérgio Cabral, Marco is the fruit of a relationship between politician Sérgio Cabral Filho and Susana Neves, a cousin of fellow politician Aécio Neves. Born in Rio de Janeiro, he studied at the traditional Catholic St. Ignatius College, in the Botafogo neighborhood, where he became a student leader.

At school, he met his classmate Mariana Noleto at the age of 13 and they began dating. After finishing school, the couple stayed together. Mariana was studying psychology and died at the age of 20 in a helicopter crash off the coast of Bahia. Marco studied law at Pontifical Catholic University of Rio de Janeiro (PUC-Rio).

== Politics ==
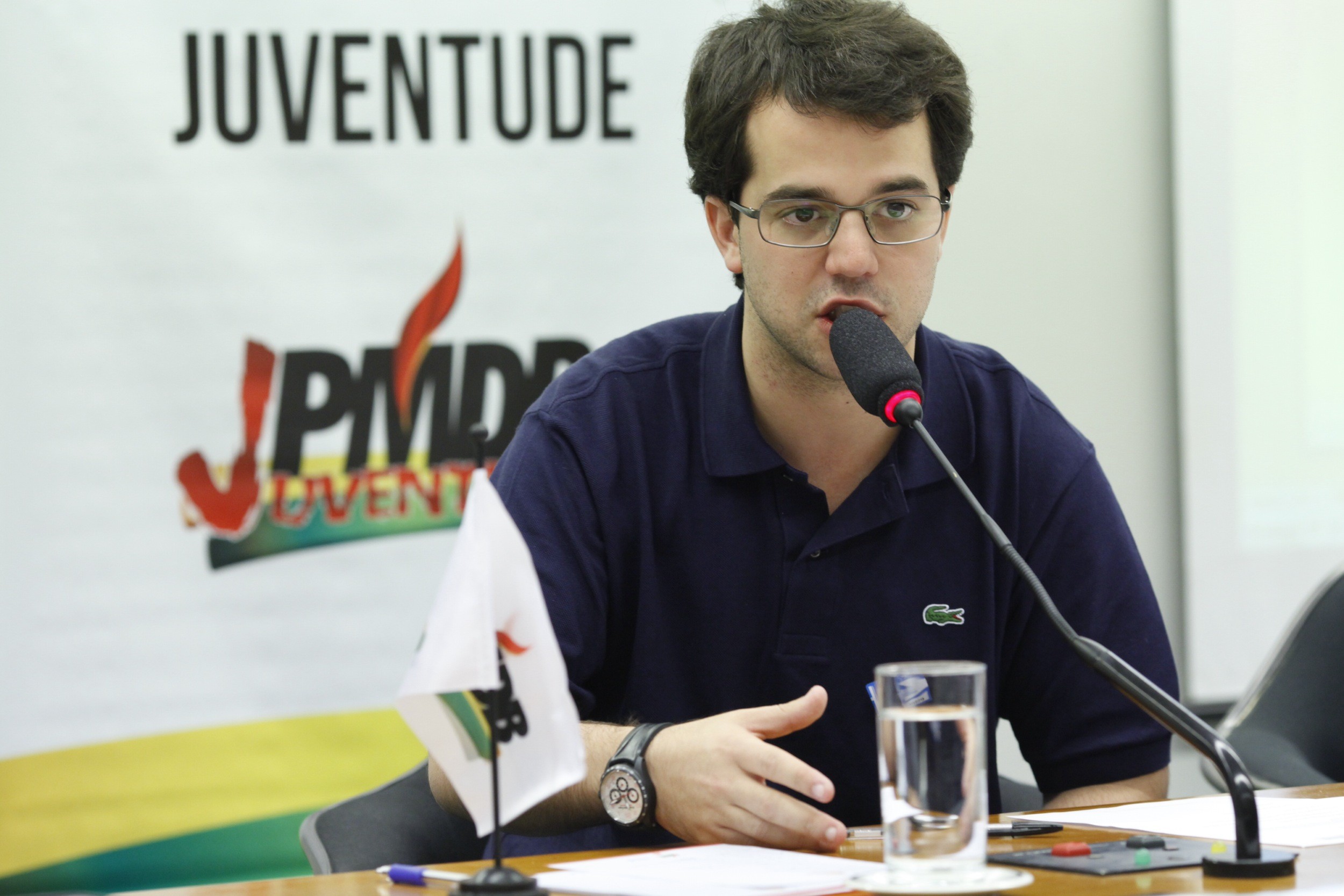
Marco Antônio Cabral at MDB youth event.

Marco Antônio Cabral began his political career very early, at the age of eleven, accompanying his father, Sérgio Cabral Filho, who was then running for the Senate in 2002. He was president of the Student Guild at Colégio Santo Inácio and was very active in youth activism. In 2009 he was elected State Youth President of the Brazilian Democratic Movement Party (PMDB) in Rio de Janeiro and in 2011 he was elected National Youth President of the same party.

In 2012, despite his low grades at university, he got a job on the 13th floor of Rio's City Hall. He got the job through “his father's friends”. In 2013, he was accused by the Superior Electoral Court (TSE) of anticipating electoral propaganda through social networks, and was forced to delete his Facebook account. The following year, he was fined 10,000 reais by the Regional Electoral Court of Rio de Janeiro (TRE-RJ) for anticipated electoral propaganda.

In the 2014 elections, he was elected federal deputy for Rio de Janeiro with 119,584 votes, ranking among the ten most voted for in the state. In December 2014, he was appointed Secretary of Sport, Leisure and Youth of the State of Rio de Janeiro by Governor Luiz Fernando Pezão, his father's successor, and was dismissed on January 19, 2017. He was responsible for bringing the WSL World Surfing Championship back to Saquarema, in the interior of the state.

In January 2016, Marco Antônio and Pedro Paulo were sent back to Brasília by the PMDB, leaving the secretariat, to vote in favor of Dilma Rouseff's impeachment process.

During his campaign for federal deputy for Rio de Janeiro, he received almost 7 million reais in donations, including half a million from the construction company Queiroz Galvão. In 2015, this same construction company had more than 160 million reais frozen by the Federal Court because of its links to the Petrobras money laundering scheme uncovered by Operation Car Wash. In August 2017, he voted in favor of President Michel Temer, in the process in which an investigation was being requested, which could remove him from the presidency of the republic. During his term in office, he missed two important votes, the PEC on the public spending ceiling and the labor reform, both under the Temer government.

In October 2017, the Federal Public Prosecutor's Office (MPF) filed a lawsuit against Marco Antônio for administrative improbity. The prosecutors' request points to irregularities in his visits to his father, former governor Sérgio Cabral Filho, arrested in 2016 in Operation Calicute, an offshoot of Car Wash.

In the 2018 elections, he obtained less than 20,000 votes and failed to be re-elected to the position of federal deputy. In 2022, he ran for federal deputy and helped organize Claudio Castro's gubernatorial campaign that same year. He declared his vote for President Luiz Inácio Lula da Silva. Once again, he was not elected to office, after receiving more than 20,000 votes.

After 18 years as a member of the MDB, he left the party in April 2026. After receiving an invitation from Áureo Lídio Moreira Ribeiro, he joined the Solidarity party with the aim of running for a seat in the Legislative Assembly of Rio de Janeiro (Alerj) in the October 2026 elections. As a candidate for the Rio de Janeiro State Legislative Assembly (Alerj), he received only 20,000 votes, finishing in 127th place in the vote count and failing to win a seat.

== Electoral performance ==
Year	Position	Party	Votes	Result	Ref.
2014	Federal deputy for Rio de Janeiro	MDB	119.58	Elected	
2018	Federal deputy for Rio de Janeiro	MDB	19.659	Not elected	
2022	Federal deputy for Rio de Janeiro	MDB	23.806	Not elected	
2026	State representative from Rio de Janeiro	Solidarity	20.433	Not elected	

== Personal life ==
He is married to Jessica Gargioni, with whom he has two children.
