= Impeachment of Wilson Witzel =

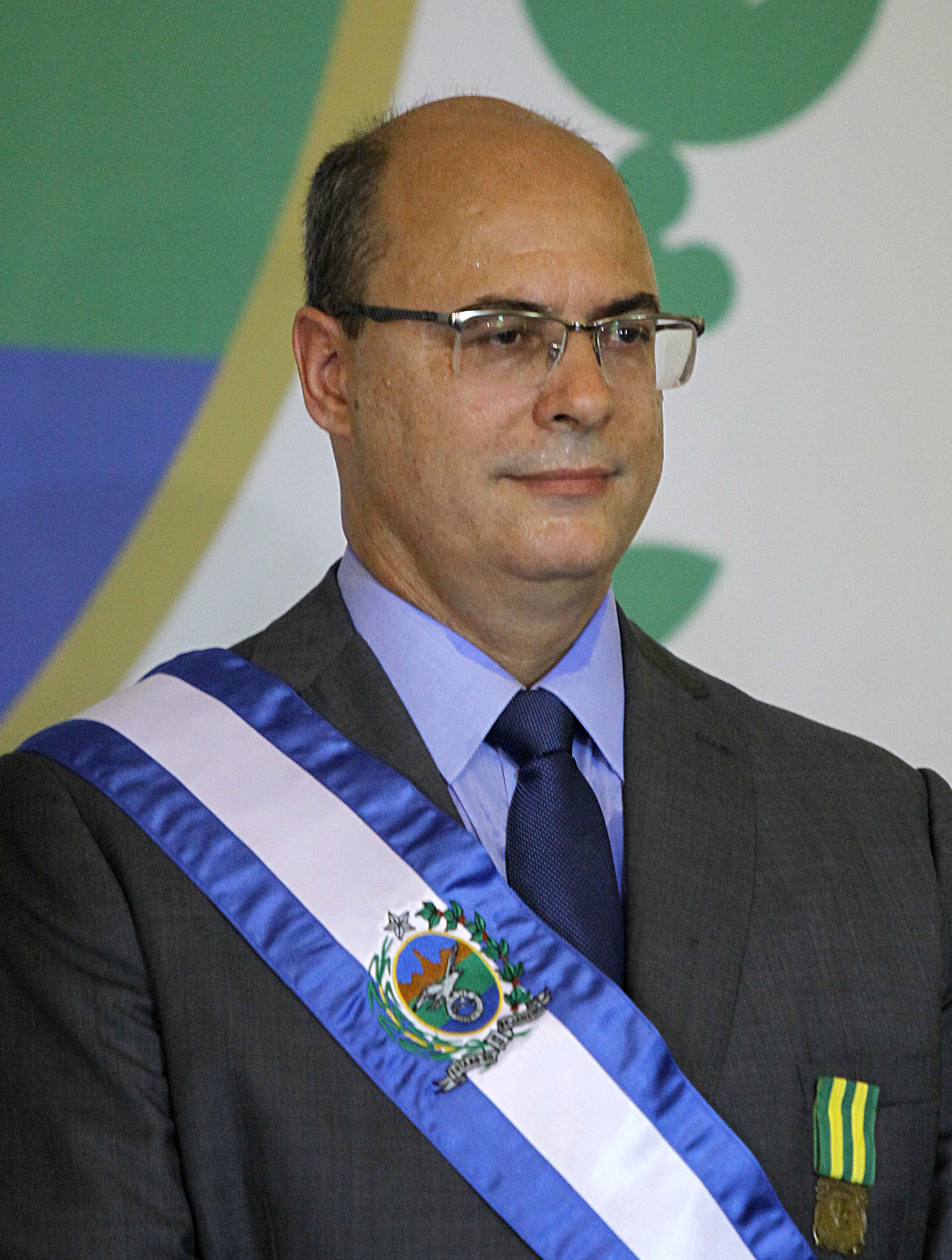
- Witzel wearing the gubernatorial sash
- Accused: Wilson Witzel, Governor of Rio de Janeiro (Note: Suspended from office and duties from 28 August 2020 until his removal on 30 April 2021.)
- Proponents: Lúcia Helena, State Deputy (PSDB); Luiz Paulo Correa, State Deputy (PSDB)
- Date: 10 June 2020 – 30 April 2021 (10 months, 2 weeks and 6 days)
- Outcome: Convicted by the Mixed Court, removed from office
- Charges: Bidding fraud in the acquisition of respirators and construction of provisory hospitals
- Cause: COVID-19 pandemic in Brazil

Votes

Voting in the Legislative Assembly
- Accusation: Vote to open impeachment process
- Votes in favor: 69
- Votes against: 0
- Not voting: 1
- Result: Approved
- Accusation: Vote to proceed with impeachment process
- Votes in favor: 69
- Votes against: 0
- Not voting: 1
- Result: Approved; sent to Mixed Court

Voting in the Mixed Court
- Accusation: Vote to begin trial
- Votes in favor: 10
- Votes against: 0
- Result: Witzel suspended from office; Cláudio Castro becomes Acting Governor
- Accusation: Vote to remove Witzel from office
- Votes in favor: 10 "guilty"
- Votes against: 0 "not guilty"
- Result: Convicted; Cláudio Castro becomes Governor; Witzel has political rights suspended for 5 years

The impeachment of Wilson Witzel, the 63rd Governor of Rio de Janeiro, occurred on 10 June 2020, when a petition for his impeachment was accepted by André Ceciliano, President of the Legislative Assembly after a symbolic voting in the virtual floor of the house. State Deputies Lúcia Helena and Luiz Paulo Correa filed a petition accusing governor Witzel of the following crimes: acquisition of overpriced respirators; suspect bidding for the construction of temporary hospitals; linking with the arrested entrepreneur Mário Peixoto; rejection of the 2019 budget by the state Court of Accounts. Once approved, the process moves to a special committee, where each one of the 29 parties in the Assembly choose representatives to make an impeachment committee. The report, authorizing the impeachment process, was approved by the special committee on 17 September. If the state assembly passes the request (36 of the 70 deputies must approve), the governor is suspended from his duties (besides his suspension from 28 August-30 April, which was authorized by the Superior Court of Justice on 28 August) and Witzel's trial began through a mixed court. On 30 April 2021, by a vote of 10–0, Witzel was convicted and removed from office, his political rights suspended for five years, with Cláudio Castro becoming the 64th governor of Rio de Janeiro.

== Context ==
At least 10 impeachment requests had been presented against Governor Wilson Witzel, elect in 2018 based in the Bolsonarism, severing ties with it later, besides not having any history with politics. A series of accusations of embezzlement of public money rose during the COVID-19 pandemic in Rio de Janeiro, with Operations Placebo and Favorite putting in doubt the suitability of the own governor and some of his state secretaries in relation to the management and acquisition of health supplies. The accounts of the state government of 2019 were also reject by the state Court of Accounts.

=== Precedents ===
The last four governors elect of Rio de Janeiro (Anthony Garotinho, Rosinha Matheus, Sérgio Cabral and Luiz Fernando Pezão) were arrested for corruption. Besides the former commanders of the state government, a series of former State Deputies, such as former presidents of the Legislative Assembly, Jorge Picciani and Paulo Melo, were also arrested. All of them were part of a group which dominated Rio for about 15 years. This caused a hard financial crisis, as one of the reflexes being the regression of the rating of many municipalities, including the capital, in the FIRJAN Index of Municipal Development (IFDM) of 2018, as well as the federal intervention in public security. All of these circumstances helped decrease trust in the political class - not only in Rio, but also in the federal scope - making this scenario a fertile territory for polarizations and for fake news.

== COVID-19 pandemic ==
After the declaration of coronavirus pandemic, lots of other accusations of embezzlement of public money had surged involving state secretaries in relation to the fight against the pandemic, and the own governor was target of Operation Placebo, of the Federal Police. With the aggravating of having a weak government support in the Legislative Assembly, representatives criticized the governor for keeping people investigated by the state Public Prosecutor's Office and Police in his staff.

== Process in the Legislative Assembly ==
The impeachment process signed by deputies Luiz Paulo Correa and Lúcia Helena was unanimously accepted on 10 June 2020 by the Legislative Assembly of Rio de Janeiro. Among the items covered in the request, it includes the suspect of overpricing and delay in the construction of campaign hospitals, as well as the rejection of the governor accounts of 2019 by the state Court of Accounts. Once approved, the process moved to a special committee, where each one of the 29 parties in the Assembly delegated representatives to create the impeachment committee. As the request was accepted by the Assembly floor (69 out of 70 deputies voted to accept it), the head of the executive branch was suspended from his duties and a mixed court was formed by:

- 5 deputies chosen by ALERJ;
  - Alexandre Freitas (NOVO);
  - Carlos Macedo (REP);
  - Chico Machado (PSD);
  - Dani Monteiro (PSOL);
  - Waldeck Carneiro (PT);
- 5 judges drawn by the state Justice Court;
  - Fernando Foch;
  - Inês Trindade Chaves de Melo;
  - José Carlos Maldonado de Carvalho;
  - Maria da Gloria Bandeira de Mello;
  - Teresa de Andrade Castro Neves;
- the President of the Justice Court, Claudio de Mello Tavares, who will vote only in case of draw.

=== The request ===
The impeachment request enumerate the following suspects:

- Acquisition of ventilators in the fight against coronavirus with suspect of overpricing;
- Construction of campaign hospitals, which bidding is under investigation;
- Supposed link between Witzel with businessman Mário Peixoto;
- Decision of the state Court of Accounts to reject the 2019 accounts of Witzel administration;
- Revoking of disqualification of OS Unir Saúde, which would be connected to Mário Peixoto and is under suspect by the federal Public Prosecutor's Office.

== See also ==
- Wilson Witzel
- COVID-19 pandemic in Brazil
