= Netinho Reis =

Brazilian politician (born 1993)

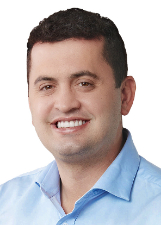
- Reis in 2024

Mayor of Duque de Caxias
- Incumbent
- Assumed office 1 January 2025
- Preceded by: Wilson Reis

Personal details
- Born: 23 June 1993 (age 33)
- Party: Brazilian Democratic Movement
- Relatives: Washington Reis (uncle); Rosenverg Reis (uncle); Gutemberg Reis (uncle)

Jonathas Rego Monteiro Porto Neto, better known as Netinho Reis (born 23 June 1993), is a Brazilian politician serving as mayor of Duque de Caxias since 2025. He is the nephew of Washington Reis, Rosenverg Reis and Gutemberg Reis.
