= Monumento Rodoviário da Rodovia Presidente Dutra =

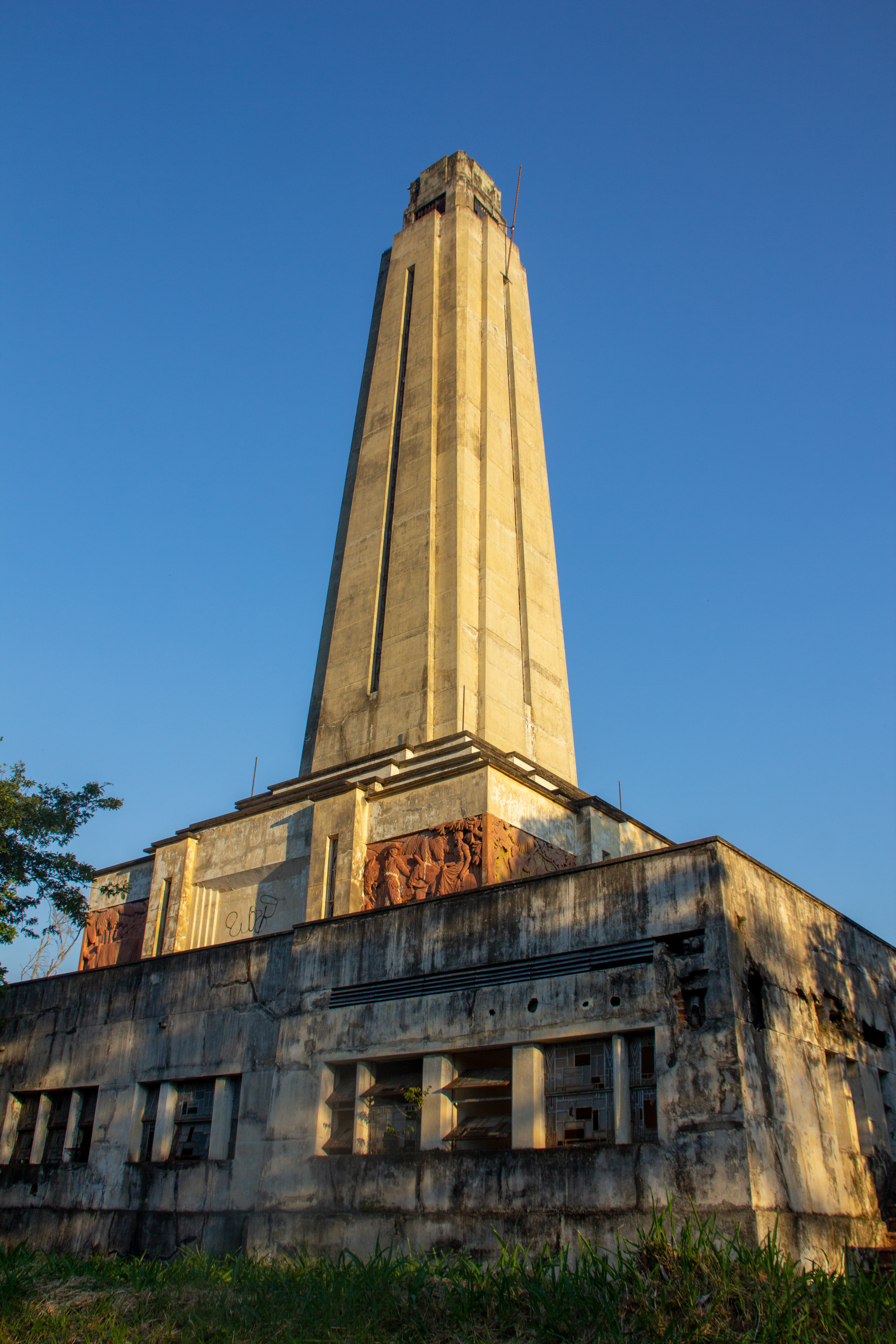
- The building in 2019
- Interactive map of the Monumento Rodoviário da Rodovia Presidente Dutra area

General information
- Status: Abandoned
- Type: Monument and rest area
- Architectural style: Art deco
- Location: Piraí, Rio de Janeiro, Brazil
- Coordinates: 22°40′23″S 43°49′57″W
- Construction started: 8 May 1926
- Inaugurated: 13 May 1938

Design and construction
- Architect: Raphael Galvão
- Civil engineer: Mario Chagas Doria; Christiani & Nielsen

The Monumento Rodoviário da Rodovia Presidente Dutra is a monument and former rest area on the Rodovia Presidente Dutra section of the BR-116, at Kilometer 226 of the Serra das Araras in Piraí, Rio de Janeiro, Brazil.

== Construction ==
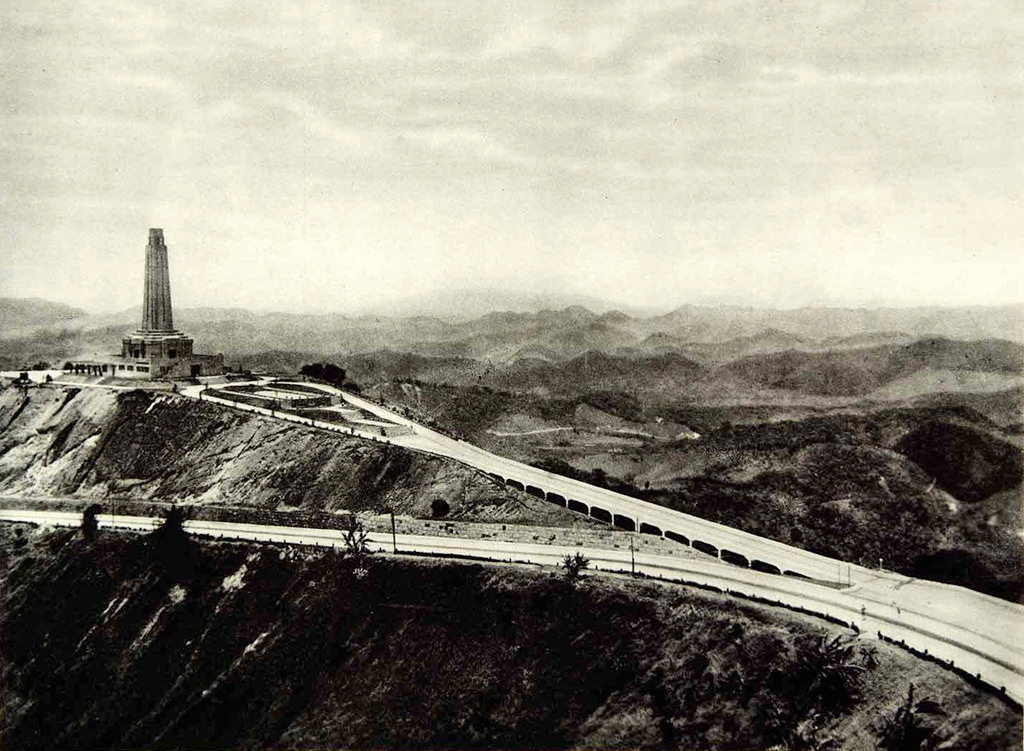
The monument in 1939

Construction of the monument started on 18 May 1926, with the foundation stone laid in 1928 by Washington Luiz, and it was inaugurated on 13 May 1938. It was created as a highway rest area and tourist observation point, and had a large restaurant and leisure area. It comprises 54,000 square metres (580,000 sq ft) of construction adjacent to the highway, with a garden area including a pond, and an art deco building, 46 metres (151 ft) tall, with two floors under a 35-metre (115 ft) tall tower that has an aerial lighthouse at the top.

It was conceived by the Touring Club do Brasil, designed by Raphael Galvão, and engineered by Mario Chagas Doria and Christiani & Nielsen. Its interior featured four panels by Candido Portinari, measuring 0.96 by 7.68 metres (3.1 ft × 25.2 ft), with the theme of "Building a highway". The exterior has eight bas-relief panels by Albert Freyhoffer showing the change in transport over time, from a litter to a carriage and ox cart up to the car in the 1930s.

== Closure ==
The monument was closed in 1978, and has been decaying ever since, with significant vandalism. It was registered as cultural heritage on 27 August 1990. The Portinari panels were removed in October 2000, restored in 2001, and are now on display at the Museu Nacional de Belas Artes.

A public civil action to restore the structure was filed by the Federal Public Ministry of Volta Redonda in October 2015. The concessionary that runs the highway past the monument says that the concessionary contract does not cover the maintenance of the monument, although it presented a plan to restore the monument that was approved with reservations before 2016, with no further progress.
