= Dornelles =

Dornelles is a surname. Notable people with the surname include:

- Francisco Dornelles (1935–2023), Brazilian lawyer, economist, and politician
- Getúlio Dornelles Vargas (1882–1954), Brazilian lawyer and politician
