= Denley =

Denley is both a surname and a given name. Notable people with the name include:

== People with the surname ==
- Jim Denley (born 1957) Australian improviser of new musics
- Michael Denley (born 1931), British athlete
- Peter Denley, New Democratic Party candidate in Ontario, Canada
- Randall Denley, Canadian journalist, author and politician

== People with the given name ==
- Denley Loge, American politician

== See also ==
- Denley Limestone, geologic formation in New York
- Re Denley's Trust Deed, an English trusts law case
- Deley
