= Cláudio Castro electoral annulment case =

Court case in Brazil, decided in 2026

- Court: Superior Electoral Court
- Started: 4 November 2025
- Decided: 24 March 2026

Court membership
- Judges sitting: President: Cármen Lúcia; Justices: Nunes Marques; André Mendonça; Isabel Gallotti (rapporteur); Antonio Carlos Ferreira; Floriano de Azevedo; Estela Aranha

Case opinions
- Decision by: Gallotti
- Concurrence: Ferreira, Azevedo, Aranha, Lúcia
- Dissent: Marques, Mendonça

Keywords
- Abuse of power

The Cláudio Castro electoral annulment case was a legal proceeding before Brazil's Superior Electoral Court (Brazilian Portuguese: Tribunal Superior Eleitoral, TSE) concerning the 2022 gubernatorial election in the state of Rio de Janeiro, in which the winning ticket headed by governor Cláudio Castro and vice governor Thiago Pampolha was accused of abuse of political and economic power during the campaign. The case centers on allegations of irregular hiring practices and misuse of public funds through foundations and social organizations linked to the state administration, which prosecutors argued benefited Castro's re-election bid.

The case was initially tried by the Regional Electoral Court of Rio de Janeiro (TRE-RJ), which on 9 May 2024 acquitted Castro and the other defendants by a vote of 4–3, concluding that the evidence presented was insufficient to characterize abuse of power. The decision was appealed by the Electoral Public Prosecutor's Office, leading to the case being brought before the TSE.

The trial at the Superior Electoral Court began in November 2025 under the rapporteurship of Justice Isabel Gallotti, who voted in favor of annulment of the ticket and the declaration of Castro's ineligibility. The proceedings were first suspended by a request for review (pedido de vista) by Justice Antonio Carlos Ferreira. The trial resumed on 10 March 2026, when Ferreira cast his vote in favor of conviction, following the rapporteur. The judgment was then suspended once again after a new request for review by Justice Kassio Nunes Marques, vice president of the Court, and was scheduled to resume on 24 March 2026.

On 23 March 2026, on the eve of the resumption of the trial, Castro announced his resignation as governor. His departure, combined with the prior vacancy of the office of Vice-Governor, resulted in a situation of double vacancy (dupla vacância) in the executive branch of the State of Rio de Janeiro. Under Brazilian law, Castro's resignation would trigger an indirect election by the Legislative Assembly of Rio de Janeiro for a new interim governor to hold office until January 2027; However, had he been removed from office by the courts, his removal from office would instead trigger a direct election for a new interim governor. The fact that he resigned during the trial left the form of the 2026 Rio de Janeiro gubernatorial special election ambiguous.

The trial was resumed and concluded on 24 March 2026, resulting in the conviction of Cláudio Castro and Thiago Pampolha by a 5–2 vote and the imposition of an eight-year ban from holding public office on both. Justices Floriano de Azevedo, Estela Aranha, and Cármen Lúcia voted to convict, while Justices Nunes Marques and André Mendonça voted for acquittal. On 23 April, the TSE published the final version of the ruling in the judgment. The document states that Castro’s mandate was not revoked due to his resignation the day before the conviction. However, the ruling leaves open the question of what form the special election should take.

On 5 May, the Electoral Public Prosecutor’s Office pointed to a contradiction in the ruling that rendered Claudio Castro ineligible, since, according to the Prosecutor’s Office, a majority of the justices voted in favor of retroactively annulling Castro's electoral mandate, but this information was not included in the ruling published by the Court. In the appeal, Deputy Electoral Prosecutor-General Alexandre Espinosa requested that the ruling be corrected so that the retroactive annulment of the mandate would be expressly recorded. On 2 June, the TSE rejected, by a 5–2 vote, the Electoral Prosecutor's appeal seeking the retroactive annulment of Castro’s mandate, since he had resigned one day before the conviction, maintaining only his ineligibility until 2030. The Court again did not address the merits of the format of the special election. The format of the special election remains undecided as of August 2026.
