= Ezequiel Teixeira =

Brazilian politician

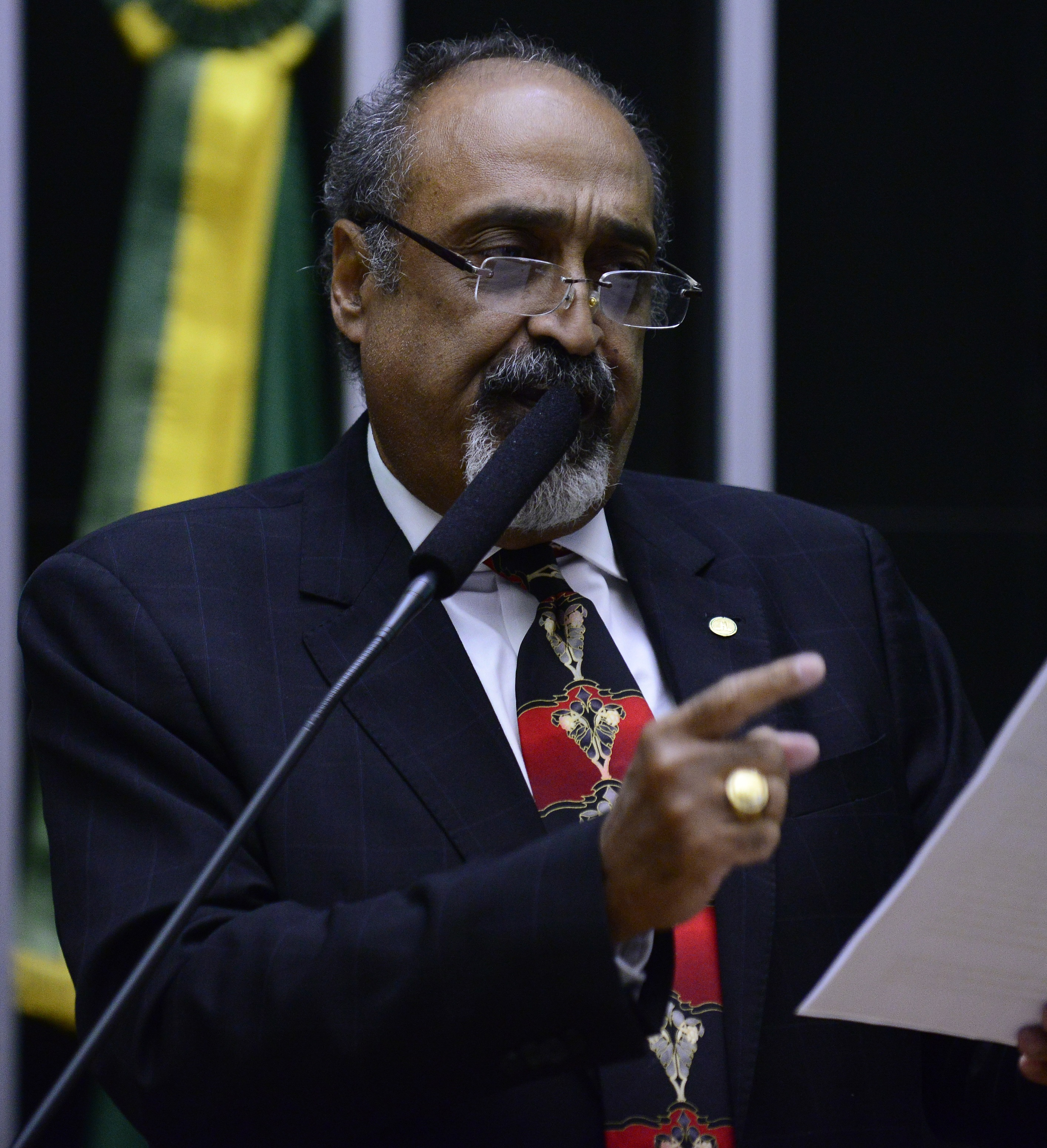
- Teixeira in April 2016

Federal Deputy for Rio de Janeiro
- In office 1 February 2015 – 31 January 2019

Personal details
- Born: 25 May 1955 (age 71) Rio de Janeiro, Brazil
- Party: SP
- Profession: pastor, lawyer

Ezequiel Teixeira (born 25 February 1955) is a Brazilian politician as well as a lawyer and pastor. He has spent his political career representing Rio de Janeiro, having been a state representative from 2015 to 2019.

== Personal life ==
Teixeira is the son of João de Lourdes Teixeira and Maria Cortaz Teixeira. He is married to Márcia Teixeira and has a daughter named Tatiana Teixeira. He is one of the pastors of an evangelical Christian church Projeto Vida Nova in Nilópolis.

== Political career ==
Teixeira voted in favor of the impeachment of then-president Dilma Rousseff. Teixeira voted in favor of the 2017 Brazilian labor reform, and voted against a corruption investigation into Rousseff's successor, Michel Temer.

There was some controversy when then governor of Rio de Janeiro Luiz Fernando Pezão nominated Teixeira as Secretariat of Human Rights in 2016. LGBT rights groups such as Rio Sem Homofobia protested against the decision as Teixeira hasd supported conversion therapy in his church.
