= Chico Machado =

Brazilian politician (born 1975)

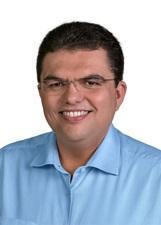
- Machado in 2022

Member of the Legislative Assembly of Rio de Janeiro
- Incumbent
- Assumed office 8 August 2017
- Preceded by: Gustavo Tutuca

Personal details
- Born: 10 December 1975 (age 50)
- Party: Solidarity

Francisco Alves Machado Neto (born 10 December 1975), better known as Chico Machado, is a Brazilian politician serving as a member of the Legislative Assembly of Rio de Janeiro since 2017. He was a municipal councillor of Macaé from 1997 to 2000 and from 2005 to 2014.
