= Thiago Pampolha =

Brazilian politician (born 1987)

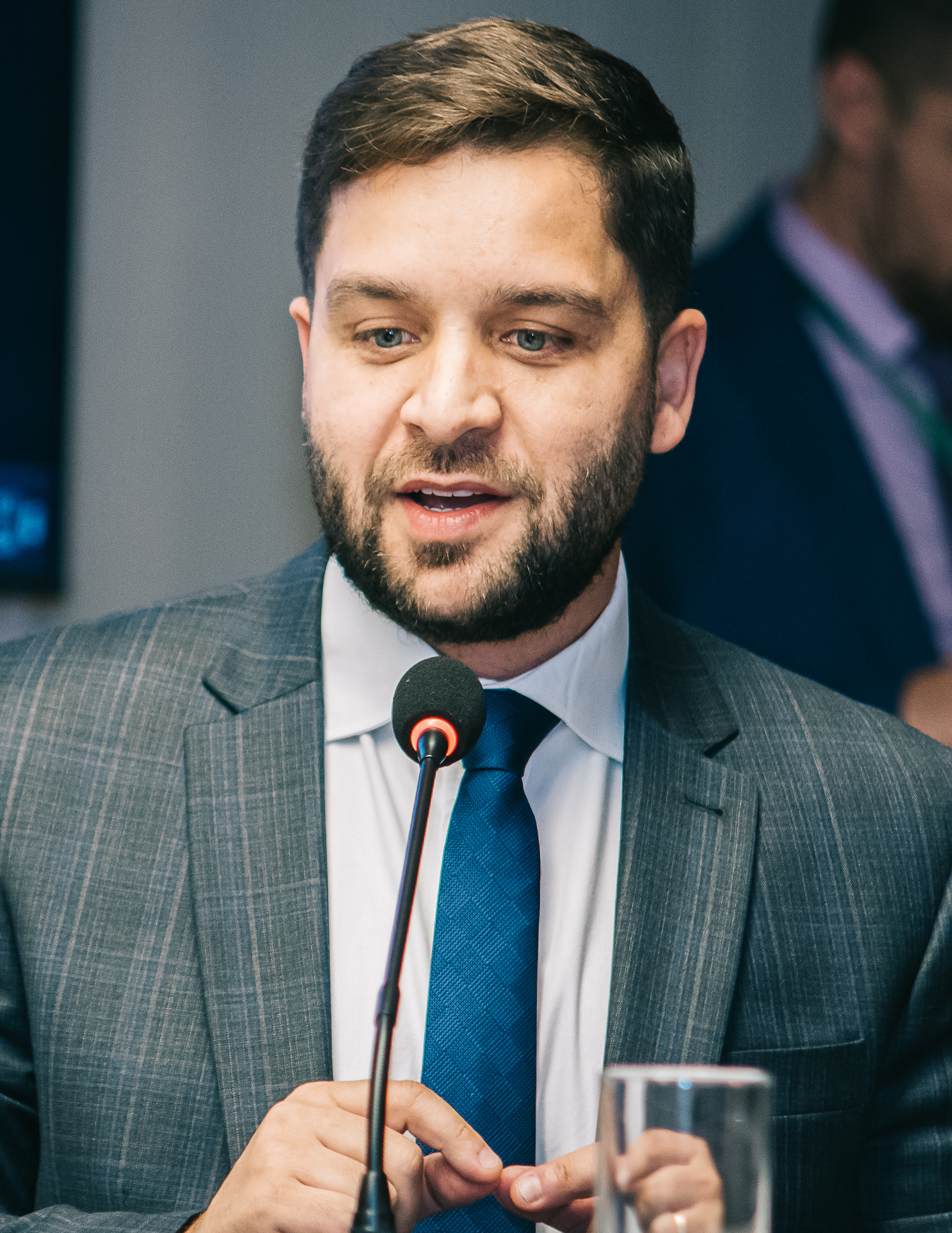
- Pampolha in 2024

Councillor of the Court of Accounts of the State of Rio de Janeiro
- Incumbent
- Assumed office 21 May 2025
- Nominated by: Cláudio Castro
- Preceded by: José Maurício Nolasco

Vice Governor of Rio de Janeiro
- In office 1 January 2023 – 21 May 2025
- Governor: Cláudio Castro
- Preceded by: Cláudio Castro
- Succeeded by: Vacant

Personal details
- Born: Thiago Pampolha Gonçalves; 13 April 1987 (age 39) Rio de Janeiro, Brazil
- Party: Independent (since 2025)
- Other political affiliations: PTC (2007–2009); PRP (2009–2011); PSD (2011–2013); PTC (2013–2016); PDT (2016–2022); UNIÃO (2022–2024); MDB (2024–2025)

Thiago Pampolha Gonçalves (born 13 April 1987) is a Brazilian politician he served as Vice Governor of Rio de Janeiro from 2023 until his resignation in 2025 to assume the position of Councilor at the State Court of Accounts of Rio de Janeiro. From 2011 to 2023, he was a member of the Legislative Assembly of Rio de Janeiro. From 2017 to 2018, he served as secretary of sports of Rio de Janeiro. From 2020 to 2022 and from 2023 to 2024, he served as secretary of the environment of Rio de Janeiro.

== Electoral history ==
Year	Election	Party	Office	Coalition	Partners	Party	Votes	Percent	Result
2010	State Elections of Rio de Janeiro	PRP	State Deputy	—N/a			19,329	0.23%	Elected
2014	State Elections of Rio de Janeiro	PTC	State Deputy	In Defense of the Family (PSC, PTC)	—N/a		41,897	0.54%	Elected
2018	State Elections of Rio de Janeiro	PDT	State Deputy	—N/a			46,137	0.60%	Elected
2022	State Elections of Rio de Janeiro	UNIÃO	Vice Governor	Stronger and United Rio (PL, MDB, Avante, DC, PMN, PODE, PP, PROS, PRTB, PSC, PTB, Republicanos, Solidariedade, UNIÃO)	Cláudio Castro	PL	4,940,288	58.67%	Elected

Political offices
Vacant Title last held by Cláudio Castro	Vice Governor of Rio de Janeiro; 2023–2025	Vacant
Preceded by José Maurício Nolasco	Councillor of the State Court of Accounts of Rio de Janeiro; 2025–present	Incumbent
