= Ricardo Couto =

Brazilian lawyer (born 1964)

- Couto in 2026

Acting Governor of Rio de Janeiro
- Incumbent
- Assumed office 23 March 2026
- Preceded by: Cláudio Castro

President of the Court of Justice of Rio de Janeiro
- Incumbent
- Assumed office 7 February 2025
- Preceded by: Ricardo Rodrigues Cardozo

Desembargador of the Court of Justice of Rio de Janeiro
- Incumbent
- Assumed office 14 February 2008

Personal details
- Born: Ricardo Couto de Castro; 7 June 1964 (age 62) Rio de Janeiro, Brazil
- Party: Independent
- Education: Rio de Janeiro State University (LLB)
- Profession: Magistrate and professor

Ricardo Couto de Castro (born 7 June 1964) is a Brazilian Judge of the Court of Appeals who was serving as president of the court of justice of Rio de Janeiro since 2025. He has served as acting governor of Rio de Janeiro since 2026.

Political offices
Preceded by Cláudio Castro	Acting Governor of Rio de Janeiro; 2026–present	Incumbent
