= 2010 Rio de Janeiro gubernatorial election =

Brazilian state election

- October 3, 2010
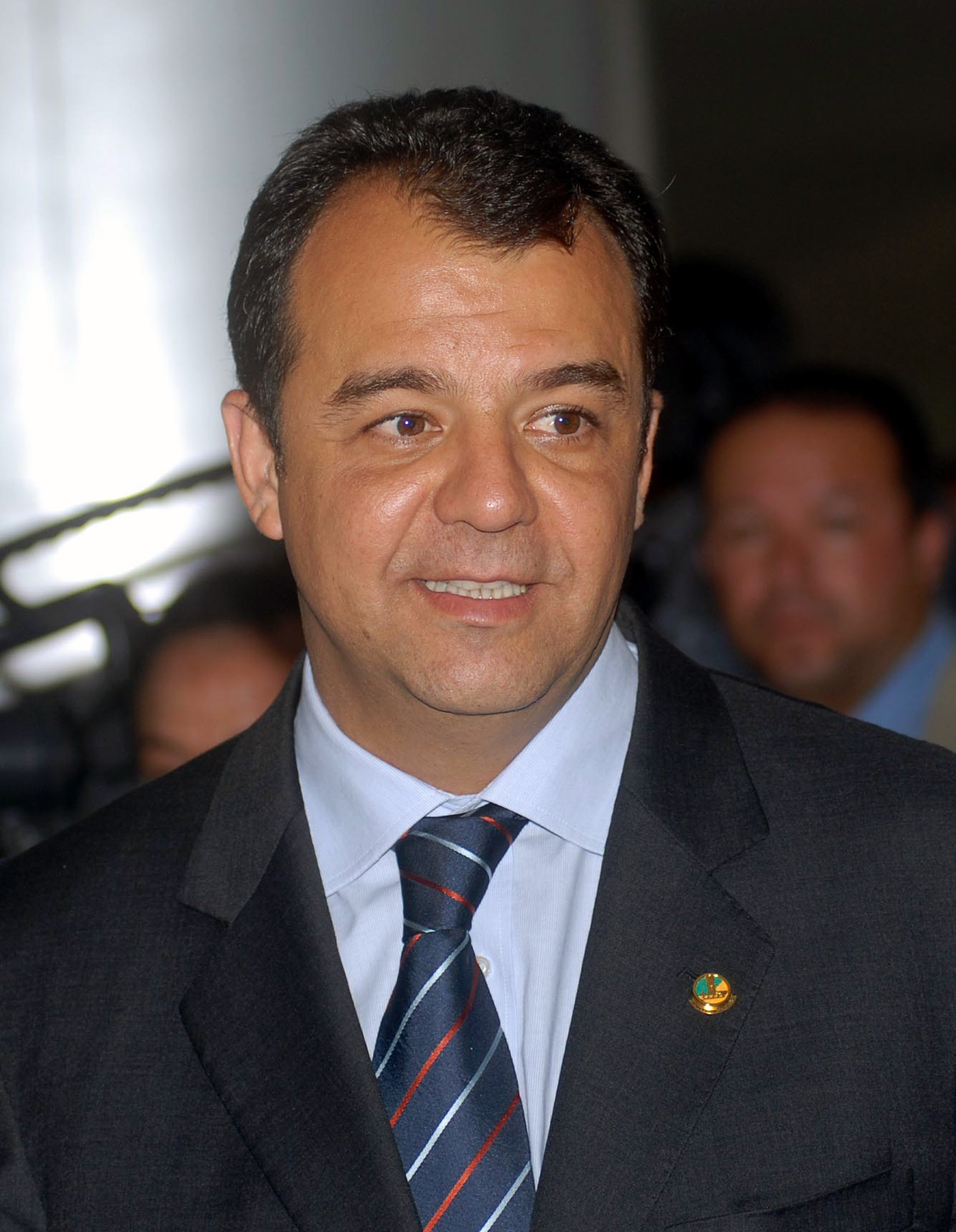

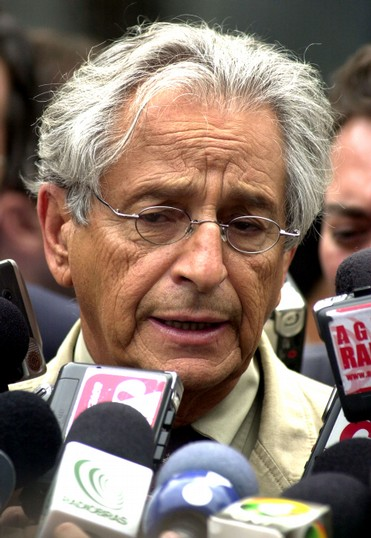
Nominee	Sérgio Cabral Filho	Fernando Gabeira
Party	PMDB	PV
Running mate	Luiz Fernando Pezão	Márcio Fortes
Popular vote	5,217,972	1,632,671
Percentage	66.08%	20.68%
Governor before election
Sérgio Cabral Filho
MDB
Elected Governor
Sérgio Cabral Filho
MDB

The Rio de Janeiro gubernatorial election was held on October 3, 2010 to elect the next governor of Rio de Janeiro. With high approval ratings, the PMDB's Sérgio Cabral Filho was easily re-elected without the need for a runoff.

== Candidates ==
=== Governor ===
No.	Governor	Vice-governor	Coalition
15	Sérgio Cabral Filho (PMDB)	Luiz Fernando Pezão (PMDB)	"Together for Rio"; PMDB, PP, PDT, PT, PTB, PSL, PTN, PSC, PSDC, PRTB, PHS, PMN, PTC, PSB, PRP, PCdoB
16	Cyro Garcia (PSTU)	Miguel Malheiros (PSTU)	–
21	Eduardo Serra (PCB)	Paulo Oliveira (PCB)	–
22	Fernando Peregrino (PR)	David Cabral (PR)	"The Strength of the People"; PR, PTdoB
43	Fernando Gabeira (PV)	Márcio Fontes (PSDB)	"Rio Hope"; PV, DEM, PSDB, PPS
50	Jefferson Moura (PSOL)	Flávio Serafini (PSOL)	–

== Election results ==
2010 Rio de Janeiro gubernatorial election
Party	Candidate	Votes	%	±%
MDB	Sérgio Cabral Filho (incumbent)	5,217,972	66.08%	
PV	Fernando Gabeira	1,632,671	20.68%	
PR	Fernando Peregrino	853,220	10.81%	
PSOL	Jefferson Moura	131,980	1.67%	
PSTU	Cyro Garcia	48,793	0.62%	
PCB	Eduardo Serra	11,299	0.14%	
Majority		3,585,301	45.40%	
MDB hold		Swing		
