= St. Ignatius College, Rio de Janeiro =

Private school in Rio de Janeiro, Brazil

St. Ignatius School, Rio de Janeiro
- Portuguese: Colégio de Santo Inácio, Rio de Janeiro

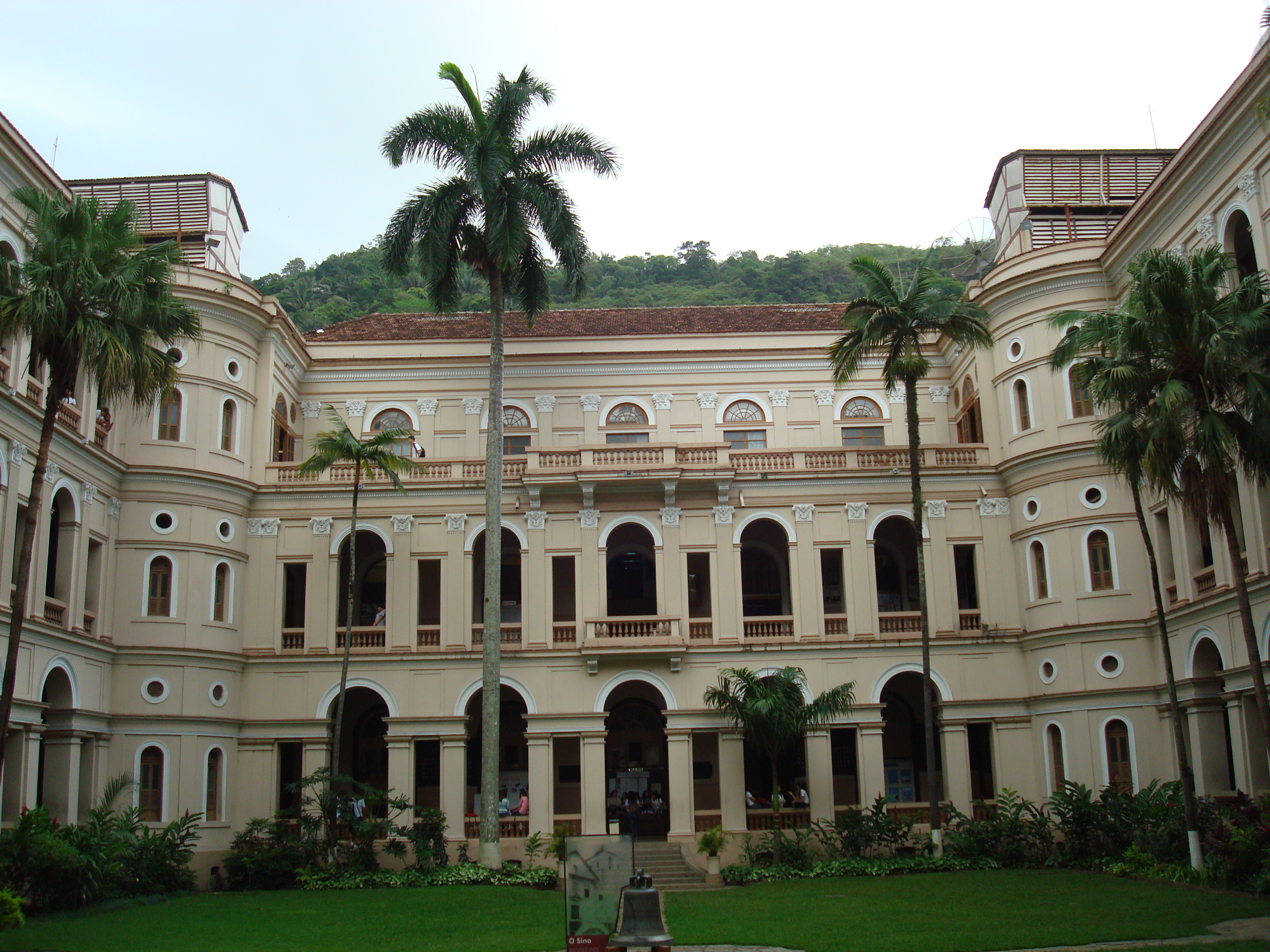

Location
- Rua São Clemente; Botafogo, Rio de Janeiro, Rio de Janeiro; Brazil
- Coordinates: 22°56′58″S 43°11′24″W

Information
- Former name: Externato St. Ignatius
- Type: Private primary and secondary school
- Religious affiliation: Catholic
- Denomination: Jesuit
- Established: 1903 (123 years ago)
- Gender: Boys' (until early 1970s); Coeducational (since early 1970s)
- Website: santoinacio-rio.com.br (in Portuguese)

St. Ignatius School, Rio de Janeiro (Portuguese: Colégio de Santo Inácio, Rio de Janeiro), is a Brazilian private, Catholic school, located in the neighborhood of Botafogo in the South Zone of the city of Rio de Janeiro. It serves students from kindergarten through secondary school, and includes also a night school for youth and adults.

The school was founded in 1903 by the Society of Jesus.

The architectural ensemble of the institution, which includes the original school building, the Church of Our Lady of Victories, the Anchieta House, and the headquarters of the Marian Congregation Our Lady of Victories, was listed as an historical site by the city of Rio de Janeiro in 2007.

== History ==
In 1567, with the expulsion of the French, the city of Rio de Janeiro was transferred to Castle Hill where in the same year a Jesuit school was founded, the first school in the city, with Father Manuel da Nobrega as the first dean.

In 1922, the hill was removed and the church and the old school building demolished. The original bell and a set of Baroque sculptures from Morro Castle church were preserved and now adorn the main courtyard and the lobby of St. Ignatius School. The columns and the front of the Church of St. Ignatius at the school's present site on Rua São Clemente were originally intended for the church attached to the school at Castle Hill which was never completed. The painting of Ignatius Loyola on his altar at the present church.

In 1900, the residence of Jesuit priests in Rio was at 35 Senador Vergueiro, in the Flamengo neighborhood. It remained there until 1902, with a small primary school where Father Alexandre Diomedi taught some boys music and prepared them for first communion. In July 1903, the priests moved to #132 Sao Clemente Avenue in Botafogo, and later to #226. They rented a house for 500 escudos, after attempts to decades of Jesuit reopen a school in Rio, began operating the Externato St. Ignatius. The first rector was Domingos de Meis, a priest. It was renamed to St. Ignatius School in 1942. He is currently held by the Brazilian Society of Education.

== Notable alumni ==
- João Amoêdo
- Eduardo Viveiros de Castro
- Cazuza
- Paulo Coelho
- Arminio Fraga
- Moreira Franco
- Arnaldo Jabor
- Prince Luiz of Orléans-Braganza
- Pedro Malan
- Vinicius de Moraes
- Marco Antônio Cabral

== See also ==
- Catholic Church in Brazil
- Education in Brazil
- List of Jesuit schools
- List of schools in Brazil
