= Bruno Dauaire =

Brazilian politician (born 1985)

Secretary of Housing of Rio de Janeiro
- Incumbent
- Assumed office 2 January 2023
- Governor: Cláudio Castro
- Preceded by: Rogério Lopes Brandi

Secretary of Social Development and Human Rights of Rio de Janeiro
- In office 4 December 2020 – 9 June 2021
- Governor: Cláudio Castro
- Preceded by: Cristiane Lamarão
- Succeeded by: Matheus Quintal

Personal details
- Born: 20 February 1985 (age 41)
- Party: Brazil Union (since 2022)

Bruno Felgueira Dauaire (born 20 February 1985) is a Brazilian politician serving as secretary of housing of Rio de Janeiro since 2023. From 2020 to 2021, he served as secretary of social development and human rights.
