= André Corrêa =

Brazilian politician (born 1964)

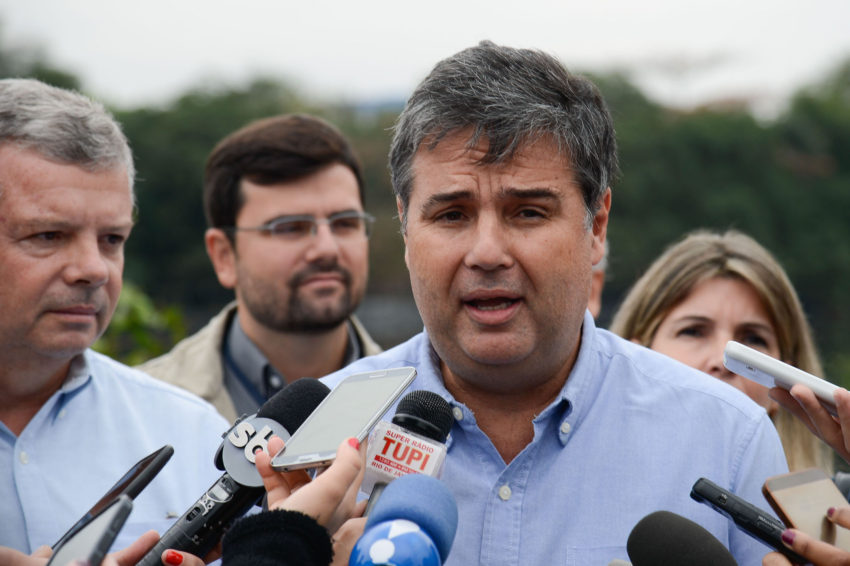
- Corrêa in 2016

Member of the Legislative Assembly of Rio de Janeiro
- Incumbent
- Assumed office 1 February 1999

Personal details
- Born: 2 January 1964 (age 62)
- Party: Progressistas (since 2022)

André Gustavo Pereira Corrêa da Silva (born 2 January 1964) is a Brazilian politician serving as a member of the Legislative Assembly of Rio de Janeiro since 1999. He has served as chairman of the budget committee since 2023.
