= Rosenverg Reis =

Brazilian politician (born 1977)

Member of the Legislative Assembly of Rio de Janeiro
- Incumbent
- Assumed office 1 February 2015

Personal details
- Born: 26 October 1977 (age 48)
- Party: Brazilian Democratic Movement (since 1995)
- Relatives: Washington Reis (brother); Gutemberg Reis (brother)

Rosenverg Reis de Oliveira (born 26 October 1977) is a Brazilian politician serving as a member of the Legislative Assembly of Rio de Janeiro since 2015. He is the brother of Washington Reis and Gutemberg Reis.
