= Gericinó =

- Neighborhood
- Location in Rio de Janeiro Gericinó (Brazil)
- Coordinates: 22°51′04″S 43°28′51″W
- Country: Brazil
- State: Rio de Janeiro (RJ)
- Municipality/City: Rio de Janeiro
- Zone: West Zone

Gericinó is a neighborhood in the West Zone of Rio de Janeiro, Brazil. It is home to a large landfill and a prison system.
