= Chico d'Ângelo =

Brazilian politician (born 1953)

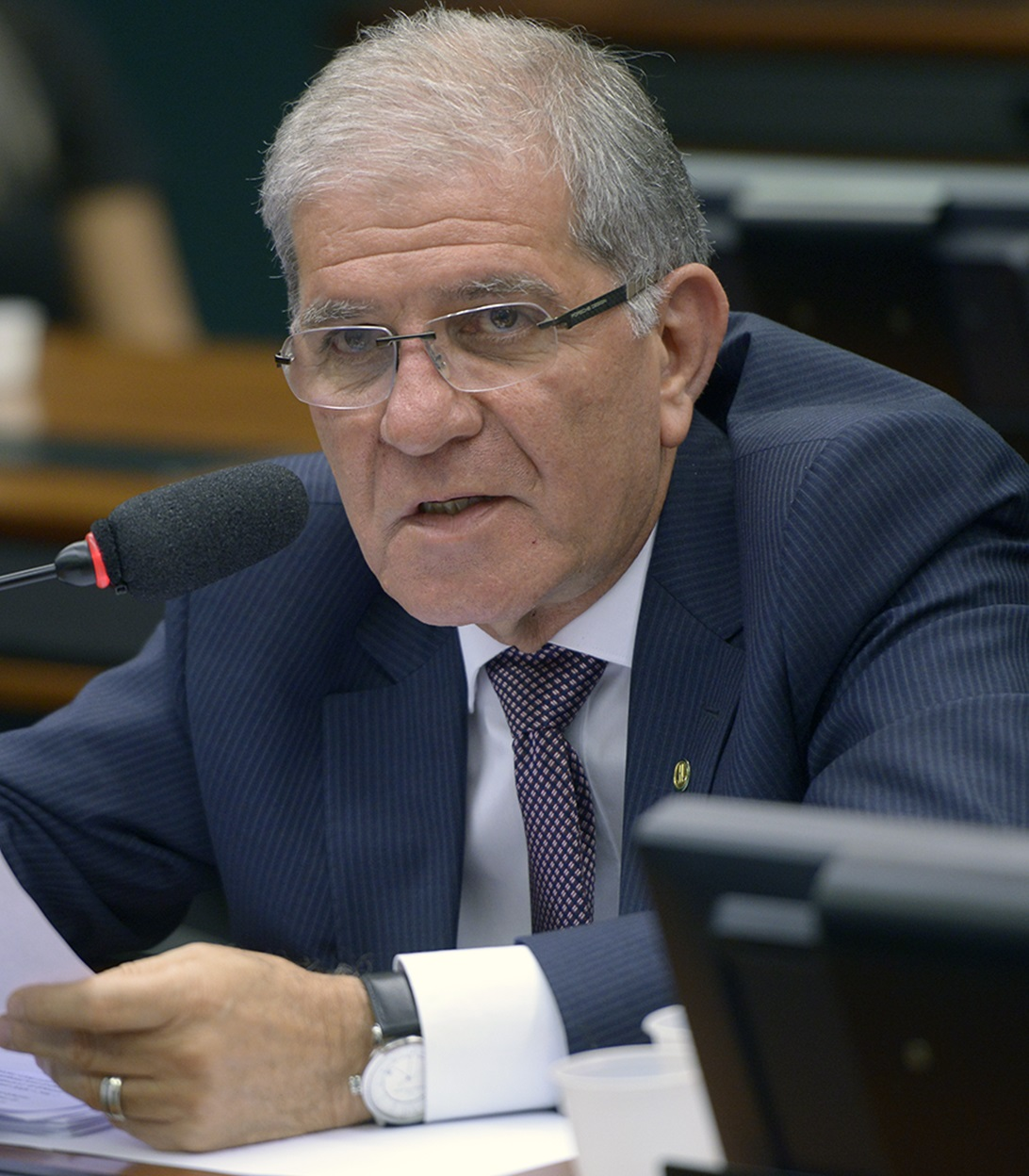
- d'Ângelo in October 2016

Federal Deputy for Rio de Janeiro
- Incumbent
- Assumed office 1 February 2007

Personal details
- Born: 11 February 1953 (age 73) Campos dos Goytacazes, RJ, Brazil
- Party: PDT

Francisco José D'Ângelo Pinto (born 11 February 1953), more commonly known as Chico d'Ângelo, is a Brazilian politician as well as a medic and professor. He has spent his political career representing Rio de Janeiro, having served as state representative since 2007.

== Personal life ==
D'Ângelo was born to Francisco José Pinto Filho and Hélia Maciel D'Angelo Pinto. Before he became a politician, D'Ângelo worked as a medic and professor.

== Political career ==
D'Ângelo voted against of the impeachment motion of then-president Dilma Rousseff. D'Ângelo voted in favor of a corruption investigation into then speaker of the house Eduardo Cunha. He voted in opposition to the 2017 Brazilian labor reforms.
