= André Lazaroni =

Brazilian politician (born 1976)

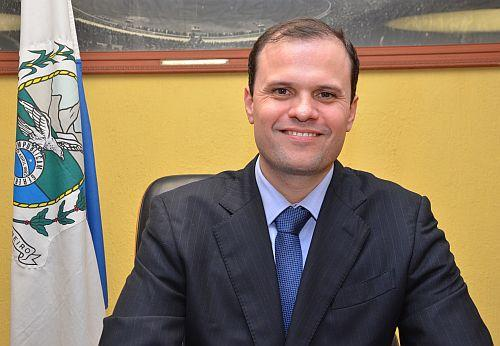
- Lazaroni in 2014

Member of the Legislative Assembly of Rio de Janeiro
- In office 1 February 2003 – 31 December 2018

Personal details
- Born: 3 December 1976 (age 49)
- Party: Cidadania (since 2025)
- Parent: Dalva Lazaroni (mother)

André Luiz Lazaroni de Moraes (born 3 December 1976) is a Brazilian politician. From 2003 to 2018, he was a member of the Legislative Assembly of Rio de Janeiro. He is the son of Dalva Lazaroni.
