= Gustavo Tutuca =

Brazilian politician (born 1979)

Member of the Legislative Assembly of Rio de Janeiro
- Incumbent
- Assumed office 1 February 2011

Personal details
- Born: 13 June 1979 (age 46)
- Party: Progressistas (since 2022)

Gustavo Reis Ferreira, better known as Gustavo Tutuca (born 13 June 1979), is a Brazilian politician. He has served as secretary of tourism of Rio de Janeiro since 2023, having previously served from 2020 to 2022. In 2013, 2015 and 2017, he served as secretary of science, technology, innovation and social development of Rio de Janeiro. From 2005 to 2010, he served as secretary of government and sports of Piraí. He has been a member of the Legislative Assembly of Rio de Janeiro since 2011.
