= Alexandre Serfiotis =

Brazilian politician and medic (born 1962)

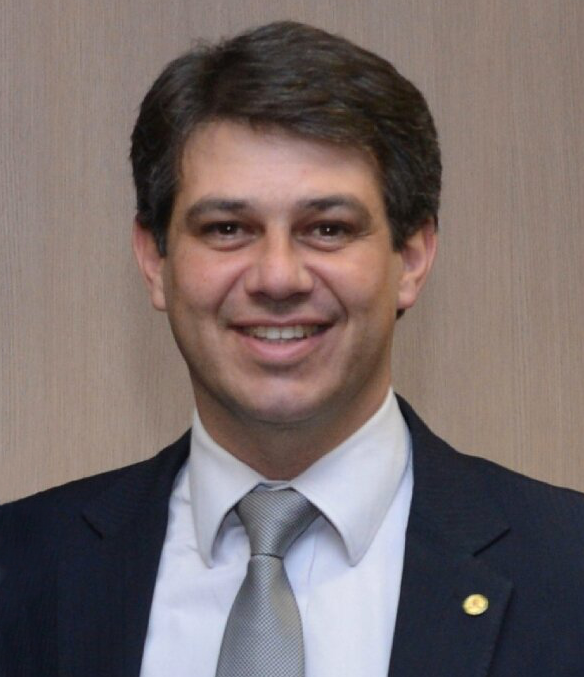
- Serfiotis in July 2016

Federal Deputy for Rio de Janeiro
- Incumbent
- Assumed office 1 February 2015

Personal details
- Born: 29 November 1975 (age 50) Porto Real, RJ, Brazil
- Party: MDB (2014–); PSD (2007–2014)

Alexandre Augustus Serfiotis (born 22 October 1962) is a Brazilian politician and medic. He has spent his political career representing Rio de Janeiro, having served as state representative since 2015.

== Personal life ==
Coutinho was born to Jorge Serfiotis and Katia Aparecida Valladares Serfiotis. Before he became a politician Sergiotis worked as a medic. Serfiotis is a graduate of the Federal University of the State of Rio de Janeiro with a post-graduate degree in cardiology. Serfiotis is an Evangelical Christian and belongs to the Fazei Discípulos Apostolic Church.

== Political career ==
Serfiotis voted in favor of the impeachment motion of then-president Dilma Rousseff. He was absent for the vote for corruption investigation into Rousseff's successor Michel Temer, but he was present for and voted in favor of the 2017 Brazilian labor reforms.

Although elected in 2014 under the banner of the PSD party, Serfiotis switched shortly after taking office to the PMDM.
