= Rosângela Gomes =

Brazilian politician (born 1966)

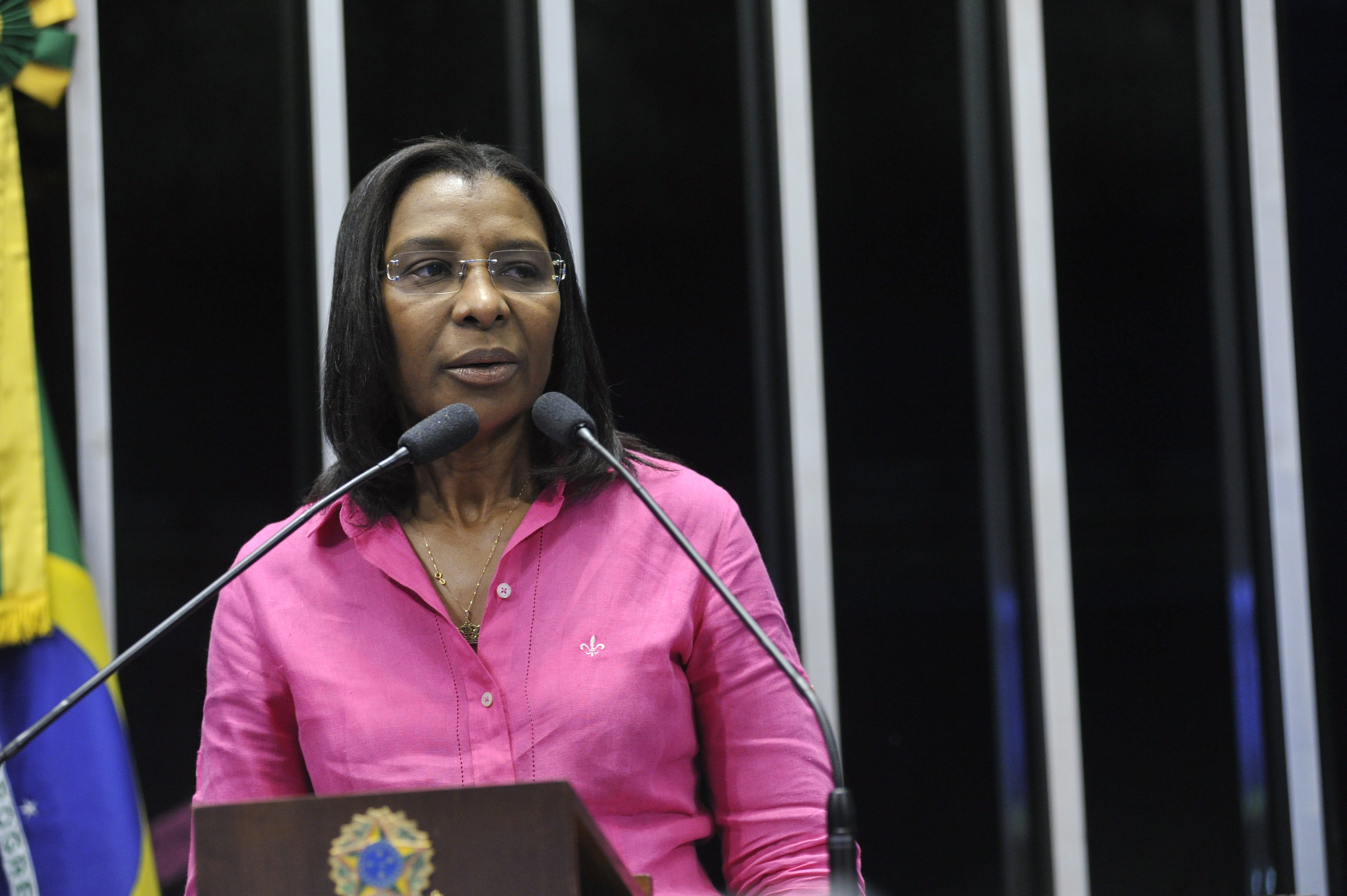
- Gomes in October 2015

Federal Deputy for Rio de Janeiro
- Incumbent
- Assumed office 1 February 2015

State Deputy for Rio de Janeiro
- In office 1 February 2011 – 30 December 2014

Vereador of Nova Iguaçu
- In office 2000–2010

Personal details
- Born: 27 December 1966 (age 59) Nova Iguaçu, Rio de Janeiro, Brazil
- Party: PRB (2005–); PL (1985–2005)

Rosângela de Souza Gomes (born 27 December 1966) is a Brazilian politician. She has spent her political career representing Rio de Janeiro, having served as state representative since 2015.

== Personal life ==
She is the daughter of Althair Costa Souza and Sulamite Souza. Gomes is a member of the Universal Church of the Kingdom of God (IURD), and the endorsement by the church's leader Edir Macedo played a big role in her getting elected to the federal chamber of deputies in the 2014 election.

== Political career ==
Before being elected to the federal chamber of deputies, Gomes served as a vereador in her hometown of Nova Iguaçu for a decade, as well as serving in the state legislature from 2011 to 2014.

In the aftermath of the 2014 election, Gomes, three other members of the IURD, and two politicians from the Assembleias de Deus church were accused by Rio de Janeiro prosecutors of violating Brazil's campaign laws by campaigning in places of worship. If convicted, the five politicians would have been suspended for eight years, but the charges were dropped.

Gomes voted in favor of the impeachment of then-president Dilma Rousseff. Gomes voted in favor of the 2017 Brazilian labor reform, and would vote against a corruption investigation into Rousseff's successor Michel Temer.
