= Washington Reis =

Brazilian politician (born 1967)

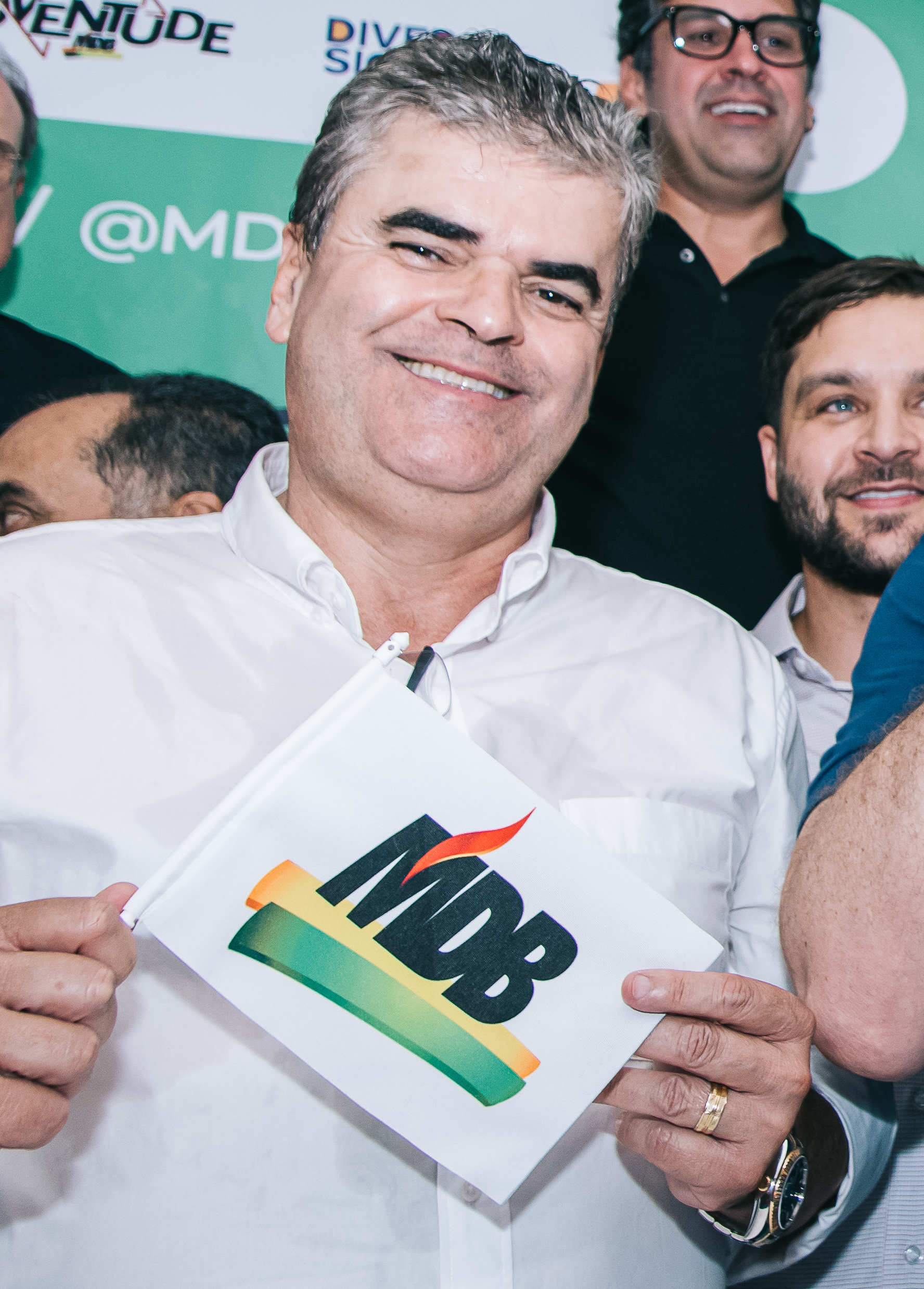
- Reis in 2024

Member of the Chamber of Deputies
- In office 1 February 2011 – 1 January 2017
- Constituency: Rio de Janeiro

Personal details
- Born: 5 April 1967 (age 59)
- Party: Brazilian Democratic Movement (since 1999)
- Relatives: Rosenverg Reis (brother); Gutemberg Reis (brother); Netinho Reis (nephew)

Washington Reis de Oliveira (born 5 April 1967) is a Brazilian politician serving as secretary of transport and urban mobility of Rio de Janeiro since 2023. He served as mayor of Duque de Caxias from 2005 to 2008 and from 2017 to 2022. From 2011 to 2017, he was a member of the Chamber of Deputies.
