= Jorge Felippe Neto =

Brazilian politician (born 1992)

Member of the Legislative Assembly of Rio de Janeiro
- Incumbent
- Assumed office 1 January 2015

Personal details
- Born: 8 January 1992 (age 34)
- Party: Avante (since 2022)
- Parent: Vanessa Felippe (mother)
- Relatives: Rodrigo Bethlem (ex-stepfather)

Jorge Felippe Neto (born 8 January 1992) is a Brazilian politician serving as a member of the Legislative Assembly of Rio de Janeiro since 2015. He is the son of Vanessa Felippe and the former stepson of Rodrigo Bethlem.
