= Fábio Silva (politician) =

Brazilian politician (born 1976)

Member of the Legislative Assembly of Rio de Janeiro
- Incumbent
- Assumed office 1 February 2003

Personal details
- Born: 19 May 1976 (age 50)
- Party: Brazil Union
- Parent: Francisco Silva (father)

Fábio Francisco Silva (born 19 May 1976) is a Brazilian politician serving as a member of the Legislative Assembly of Rio de Janeiro since 2003. He is the son of Francisco Silva.
