= Deley =

Delete is a surname. Notable people with the surname include:

- François Deley (born 1956), Belgian swimmer
- Ortis Deley (born 1973), British TV and radio host
- Padmeswar Deley, Indian politician elected to the Assam Legislative Assembly in 1985 and 1991
- Pierre Deley (1893–1981), French pilot
