= Áureo Lídio Moreira Ribeiro =

Brazilian politician and businessman

Áureo Ribeiro
- Ribeiro in 2018

Member of the Chamber of Deputies
- Incumbent
- Assumed office 1 February 2011
- Constituency: Rio de Janeiro

Personal details
- Born: Aureo Lídio Moreira Ribeiro; 17 February 1979 (age 47) Duque de Caxias, Rio de Janeiro, Brazil
- Party: Solidariedade (since 2013)
- Other political affiliations: PRTB (2009–2013)
- Profession: Businessman

Áureo Lídio Moreira Ribeiro (born 17 February 1979) often simply known as Áureo is a Brazilian politician and a businessman. Born in Rio de Janeiro, he has served as a state representative since 2015.

== Personal life ==
Áureo is married to Aline and has two children: Gabriel and Alice. He is a member of the Methodist Church.

== Political career ==
Áureo has been the head of the Solidariedade party in the Brazilian chamber of deputies since September 2017.

Áureo voted in favor of the impeachment against then-president Dilma Rousseff. Áureo opposed the Brazil labor reform (2017), and would later also vote in favor of a corruption investigation into Rousseff's successor Michel Temer and a similar impeachment motion.
