= Sérgio Cabral Filho =

Brazilian politician

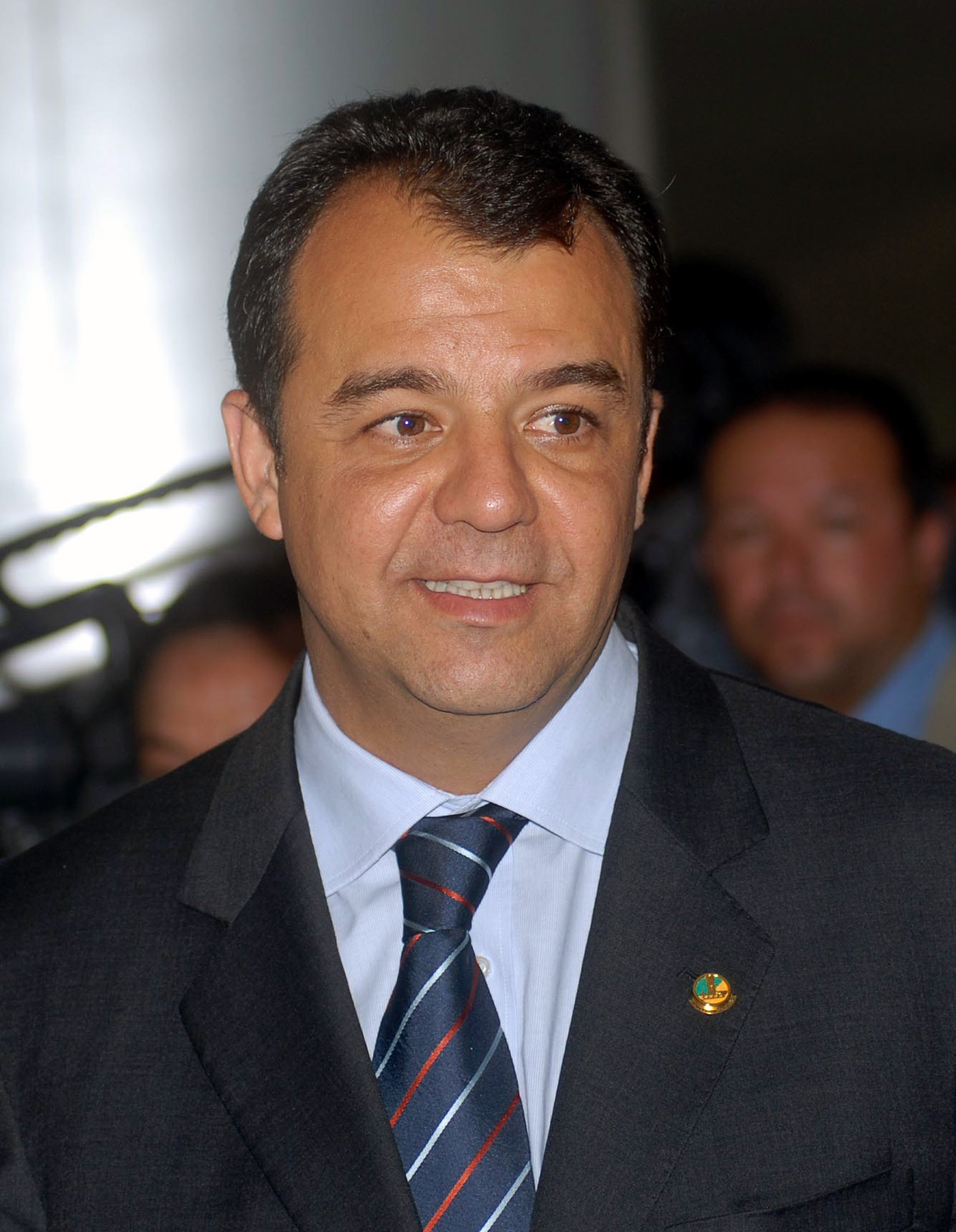
- Cabral in 2006

Governor of Rio de Janeiro
- In office January 1, 2007 – April 3, 2014
- Lieutenant: Luiz Fernando Pezão
- Preceded by: Rosinha Garotinho
- Succeeded by: Luiz Fernando Pezão

Senator for Rio de Janeiro
- In office February 1, 2003 – January 1, 2007

President of the Legislative Assembly of Rio de Janeiro
- In office January 1, 1995 – January 1, 2003
- Preceded by: José Nader
- Succeeded by: Jorge Picciani

Member of the Legislative Assembly of Rio de Janeiro
- In office January 1, 1991 – January 1, 2003

Personal details
- Born: Sérgio de Oliveira Cabral Santos Filho; January 27, 1963 (age 63) Rio de Janeiro, Brazil
- Party: MDB (1980–1992; 1999–present)
- Other political affiliations: PSDB (1992–1999)
- Spouse: Adriana de Lourdes Ancelmo (2004–2011; separated)
- Children: Marco Antônio Cabral

Sérgio de Oliveira Cabral Santos Filho (born January 27, 1963) is a Brazilian politician and journalist who served as the governor of Rio de Janeiro from 2007 to 2014. A member of MDB, he previously served as the president of the Legislative Assembly of Rio de Janeiro from 1995 to 2003, and was a senator for Rio de Janeiro from 2003 to 2007. Cabral was convicted on charges of corruption and money laundering as part of Operation Car Wash in 2017.

The son of journalist Sérgio Cabral and a graduate of Centro Universitário da Cidade do Rio de Janeiro, he successfully ran for Rio de Janeiro's state assembly in 1990. Cabral served as a representative from 1991 to 2003, having served as its president from 1995 to 2003. He unsuccessfully ran for Mayor of Rio de Janeiro in the elections of 1992 and 1996.

In the 2002 general elections, he was elected senator for the state of Rio de Janeiro, a position he occupied from January 2003 until December 2006, when he resigned to run in the Rio de Janeiro gubernatorial elections, having been replaced in Brazilian Senate by Regis Fichtner Velasco. He was elected governor of the state of Rio de Janeiro in the 2006 Brazilian general election and sworn into office on January 1, 2007.

Cabral became widely known for his implication in Operation Car Wash, having accepted bribes in exchange for construction contracts and paid members of the International Olympic Committee to vote in favor of bringing the 2016 Summer Olympics to Rio de Janeiro. He was arrested on charges of corruption in 2016, charged with corruption and money laundering, and received multiple sentences totaling over 400 years. In 2024, some of his charges were annulled.

== Tenure as governor ==
Cabral became governor at a time of uncertain economic prospects and serious security challenges in his state of Rio de Janeiro. During the election campaign for governor in 2006, he had praised the "zero tolerance" security model touted by New York City Mayor Rudy Giuliani and pledged to root out police corruption and improve services in Rio's favelas.

After visiting Colombia in 2007 to observe that country's success in the realm of public safety, Cabral secured additional funding for the police and tasked Public Security Secretary, José Mariano Beltrame with spearheading a plan to improve security. In 2008, the state and city governments launched a community policing program called Pacifying Police Units, or UPPs, in Rio. In contrast to previous police practices, UPPs created a sustained, long-term police presence in favelas, including the Cidade de Deus, Complexo do Alemão and Santa Marta. Their operations made use of Rio military police's BOPE units in fighting urban crime and also use their Police Pacification Units for extended policing. These methods led to decreased homicide rates in the favelas where UPPs were set up.

The magazine Brasil de Fato described him in 2007 as a political figure who " relentlessly justifies police violence in poor areas of the city. His latest statement was to claim that people living in the favelas are being paid by drug traffickers to complain about police raids."

In healthcare, Cabral launched a mobile health unit that travels around the state giving free tests to the public in local areas.

Cabral also streamlined management of the state's finances through tax adjustments and adoption of strict modern management techniques such as electronic bidding. These measures led Rio de Janeiro to become the first Brazilian state to be ranked as "investment grade", by the world's most important risk rating agency, Standard & Poor's. At the time, the agency announced that "the strong management that has prevailed in the State over the past three years" and the fact that the state was "backed by a strong and diverse economy with an estimated GDP per capita of around 25% above the average in Brazil" made it achieve a global rating of "BBB−" and a "brAAA" credit rating on national scale.

His first tenure as governor was also marked by achievements for the LGBT community, especially the creation of Rio Sem Homofobia (Rio Without Homophobia), a program that aims to combat homophobia in public policies in the state. Cabral was also the first governor of Rio de Janeiro to participate in an LGBT parade.

In transportation, Cabral renovated the fleet of SuperVia trains, which had only ten trains in 2007 with air conditioning. Today, all 100 trains have air conditioning. He was also the governor who built most kilometers of underground metro lines since the subway began operation in the 1970s.

Security improvements, economic growth and Rio winning the bid for the 2016 Summer Olympics helped to increase Cabral's popularity and led him to an easy re-election victory in the 2010 Rio de Janeiro gubernatorial election, with more than 66% of the vote. He was seen as a key ally to Presidents Lula and Dilma and was regarded as potential vice presidential candidate.

== Awards ==
On September 14, 2009, Sérgio Cabral received the Légion d'honneur (National Order of the Legion of Honor), the highest award of the French government. The medal ceremony took place in Paris in the French Senate.

On May 8, 2008, Cabral received an award as the 2008 Personalidade Cidadania, or Good Citizen Award, for the roster of his political and social achievements during his tenure in the legislative and executive branches of government. He was selected by 4,327 representatives from various segments of civil society, by direct voting. The prize is an initiative of Unesco, Folha Dirigida and Associação Brasileira de Imprensa (ABI).

In 2013, Cabral received the Brazilian Person of the Year award from the Spain-Brazil Chamber of Commerce for his contribution to health and public safety in state of Rio through the projects of the public health assistance units and UPPs.

== Corruption charges and arrest ==
Recently, he was accused of charging 5% on every contract awarded to Odebrecht, including those for restoring the Maracanã stadium and the Coperj railroad. According to the Folha de S.Paulo newspaper, he was implicated in Operation Car Wash by Benedicto Barbosa da Silva Júnior, the companies' director.

On November 17, 2016, the Federal Police of Brazil arrested Sérgio Cabral and seven other persons (including former secretaries of his government), as part of Operation Car Wash.

He was accused of embezzling 224 million Brazilian reals, more than $80 million US. On December 6, 2016, the court heard charges filed by the Federal Public Prosecutor's Office (MPF), then charged Sérgio Cabral with corruption, racketeering and money laundering. On the same day, Adriana Ancelmo, Cabral's wife, was also arrested.

In February 2017, the MPF-RJ accused Cabral as part of Operation Efficiency, another operation connected to Operation Car Wash.

On 13 June 2017, he was sentenced to 14 years and two months of imprisonment for passive corruption and money laundering. On 20 September 2017 he was sentenced to an additional 45 years imprisonment for embezzlement.

On July 3, 2018, within the scope of the Carwash probe; failed Brazilian businessman Eike Batista was convicted of bribing Cabral for state government contracts, paying him US$16.6 million. Held at the Gericinó penitentiary in Bangu, Rio de Janeiro, Brazil, Batista was sentenced to 30 year imprisonment; Brazilian law limits sentences to 30 years served.

Preceded by Rosinha Garotinho	Governor of Rio de Janeiro; 2007–2014	Succeeded by Luiz Fernando Pezão
