= Gutemberg Reis =

Brazilian politician (born 1979)

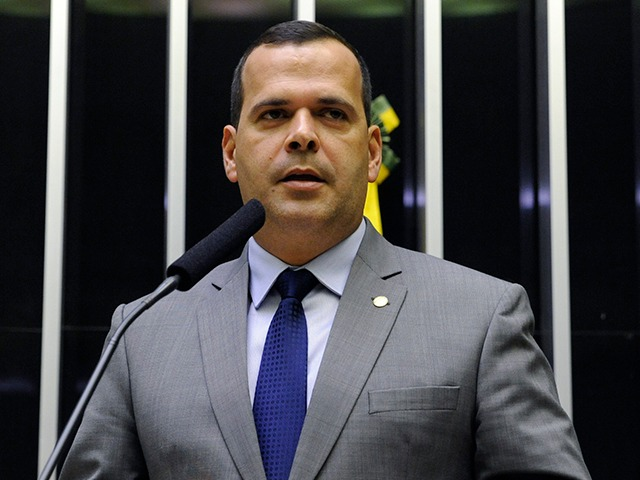
- Reis in 2019

Member of the Chamber of Deputies
- Incumbent
- Assumed office 1 February 2019
- Constituency: Rio de Janeiro

Personal details
- Born: Gutemberg Reis de Oliveira; 9 September 1979 (age 47) Duque de Caxias, Rio de Janeiro, Brazil
- Party: MDB (since 2005)
- Relatives: Washington Reis (brother)

Gutemberg Reis de Oliveira (born 9 September 1979) is a Brazilian politician serving as a member of the Chamber of Deputies since 2019. He is the brother of Washington Reis.
