= Francisco Dornelles =

Brazilian lawyer, economist and politician (1935–2023)

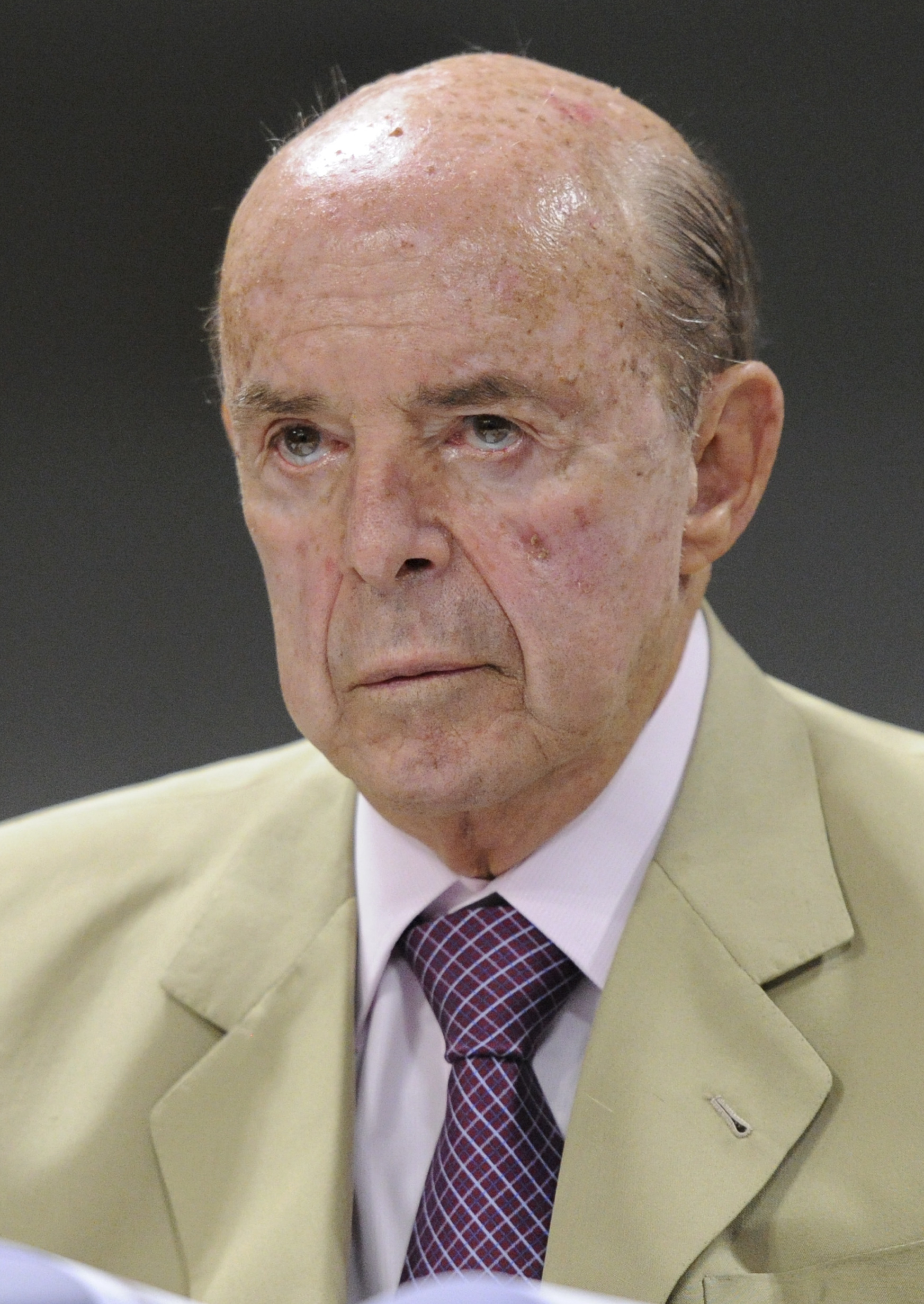
- Dornelles in 2014

Acting Governor of Rio de Janeiro
- In office 29 November 2018 – 31 December 2018
- Preceded by: Luiz Fernando Pezão
- Succeeded by: Wilson Witzel
- In office 28 March 2016 – 31 October 2016
- Preceded by: Luiz Fernando Pezão
- Succeeded by: Luiz Fernando Pezão

Lieutenant Governor of Rio de Janeiro
- In office 1 January 2015 – 31 December 2018
- Governor: Luiz Fernando Pezão
- Preceded by: Luiz Fernando Pezão
- Succeeded by: Cláudio Castro

Senator for Rio de Janeiro
- In office 1 February 2007 – 1 January 2015
- Preceded by: Saturnino Braga
- Succeeded by: Romário

Member of the Chamber of Deputies
- In office 3 April 2002 – 1 February 2007
- Constituency: Rio de Janeiro
- In office 31 March 1998 – 1 January 1999
- Constituency: Rio de Janeiro
- In office 1 February 1987 – 7 May 1996
- Constituency: Rio de Janeiro

Minister of Labor
- In office 1 January 1999 – 8 April 2002
- President: Fernando Henrique Cardoso
- Preceded by: Edward Amadeo
- Succeeded by: Paulo Jobim Filho

Minister of Development, Industry and Foreign Trade
- In office 6 May 1996 – 30 March 1998
- President: Fernando Henrique Cardoso
- Preceded by: Dorothea Werneck
- Succeeded by: José Botafogo Gonçalves

Minister of Finance
- In office 15 March 1985 – 26 August 1985
- President: José Sarney
- Preceded by: Carlos Viacava
- Succeeded by: Dilson Funaro

Personal details
- Born: 7 January 1935 Belo Horizonte, Minas Gerais, Brazil
- Died: 23 August 2023 (aged 88) Rio de Janeiro, Brazil
- Party: PP (2003–2023)
- Other political affiliations: PTB (1959–1964); ARENA (1972–1980); PDS (1980–1984; 1993); PMDB (1984–1986); PFL (1986–1993); PPR (1993–1995); PPB (1995–2003)
- Spouse: Cecília Andrade
- Children: Mariana; Luciana
- Education: Federal University of Rio de Janeiro (LLB); Harvard University (BEc)
- Profession: Economist

Francisco Dornelles (7 January 1935 – 23 August 2023) was a Brazilian lawyer, economist, and politician. He was the vice governor of Rio de Janeiro from 2015 to 2019 and was the interim Governor during March and October 2016 following the illness of governor Luiz Fernando Pezão. He represented Rio de Janeiro in the Federal Senate from 2007 to 2015, until he resigned from the post to take office as vice governor. Previously, he served as a deputy from Rio de Janeiro and several positions in presidents José Sarney and Fernando Henrique Cardoso's cabinets from 1987 to 2007. He was a member of the Progressistas.

Dornelles assumed office as acting governor twice: on 28 March 2016, when Governor Pezão left office to treat a lymphoma, and on 29 November 2018, when the Governor was arrested by the Federal Police in a new phase of Operation Car Wash.

Francisco Dornelles died on 23 August 2023, at the age of 88.

Political offices
Preceded by Carlos Viacava	Minister of Finance; 1985	Succeeded by Dilson Funaro
Preceded by Dorothea Werneck	Minister of Development, Industry and Foreign Trade; 1996–1998	Succeeded by José Botafogo Gonçalves
Preceded by Edward Amadeo	Minister of Labor; 1999–2002	Succeeded by Paulo Jobim Filho
Vacant Title last held by Luiz Fernando Pezão	Vice Governor of Rio de Janeiro; 2015–2018	Vacant Title next held by Claudio Castro
Preceded by Luiz Fernando Pezão	Acting Governor of Rio de Janeiro; 2018	Succeeded by Wilson Witzel
