= Cláudio Castro =

Brazilian lawyer and politician (born 1979)

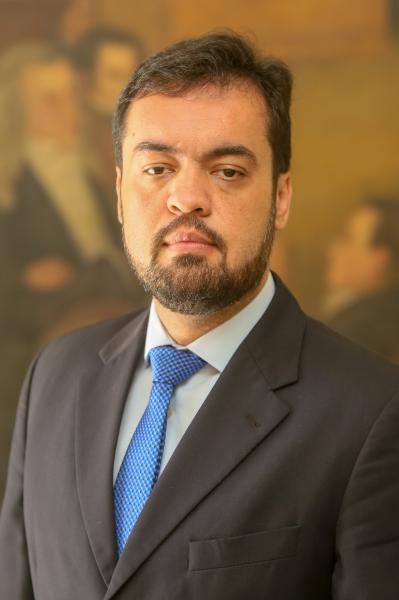
- Castro in 2019

Governor of Rio de Janeiro
- In office 1 May 2021 – 23 March 2026; Acting: 28 August 2020 – 1 May 2021
- Lieutenant: Vacant (2021–2022); Thiago Pampolha (2023–2025); Vacant (2025–2026)
- Preceded by: Wilson Witzel
- Succeeded by: Ricardo Couto (acting)

Lieutenant Governor of Rio de Janeiro
- In office 1 January 2019 – 1 May 2021
- Governor: Wilson Witzel
- Preceded by: Francisco Dornelles
- Succeeded by: Thiago Pampolha

Councillor of Rio de Janeiro
- In office 1 January 2017 – 1 January 2019
- Constituency: At-large

Personal details
- Born: Cláudio Bomfim de Castro e Silva; 29 March 1979 (age 47) Santos, São Paulo, Brazil
- Party: PL (2021–present)
- Other political affiliations: PSC (2002–2021)
- Spouse: Analine Costa (m. 2006)
- Children: 2
- Parents: Clerto de Castro e Silva (father); Lúcia de Fátima Bomfim (mother)
- Education: Federal University of Rio de Janeiro (LLB); University of Salamanca (LLM, LLD)

Cláudio Bomfim de Castro e Silva (born 29 March 1979) is a Brazilian lawyer and politician who has served as governor of Rio de Janeiro from 2020 to 2026. A member of the Liberal Party (PL), he was previously the vice governor of the state, under Governor Wilson Witzel, and acceded to the governorship after Witzel's impeachment and removal from office for corruption. He was re-elected in 2022 in the first round.

On 23 March 2026, Castro resigned from the governorship in order to run for the Federal Senate, amid an ongoing trial before the Superior Electoral Court (TSE) that could have led to his removal from office. The following day, on 24 March 2026, the TSE convicted him by a 5–2 vote for abuse of political and economic power in the 2022 election and imposed an eight-year ban from holding public office.

== Biography ==
He moved to Rio de Janeiro as a child. In 2005, Castro graduated in Law at Federal University of Rio de Janeiro (UFRJ). He is married and father of two children. Castro is a Roman Catholic singer and musician.

=== Political experience ===
In 2004, he began his political history as chief of staff of former City Councillor Márcio Pacheco, who he followed to the Legislative Assembly of Rio de Janeiro until 2016, also as chief of staff.

Cláudio Castro was also special advisor of the Municipal Secretariat of People with Disabilities. In 2013, worked as special advisor in the Chamber of Deputies, in Brasília.

In 2016, Castro was elected to the Municipal Chamber with 10,262 votes, being the 56th most voted candidate. It came after a first unsuccessful try in 2012, when he received 8,298 votes.

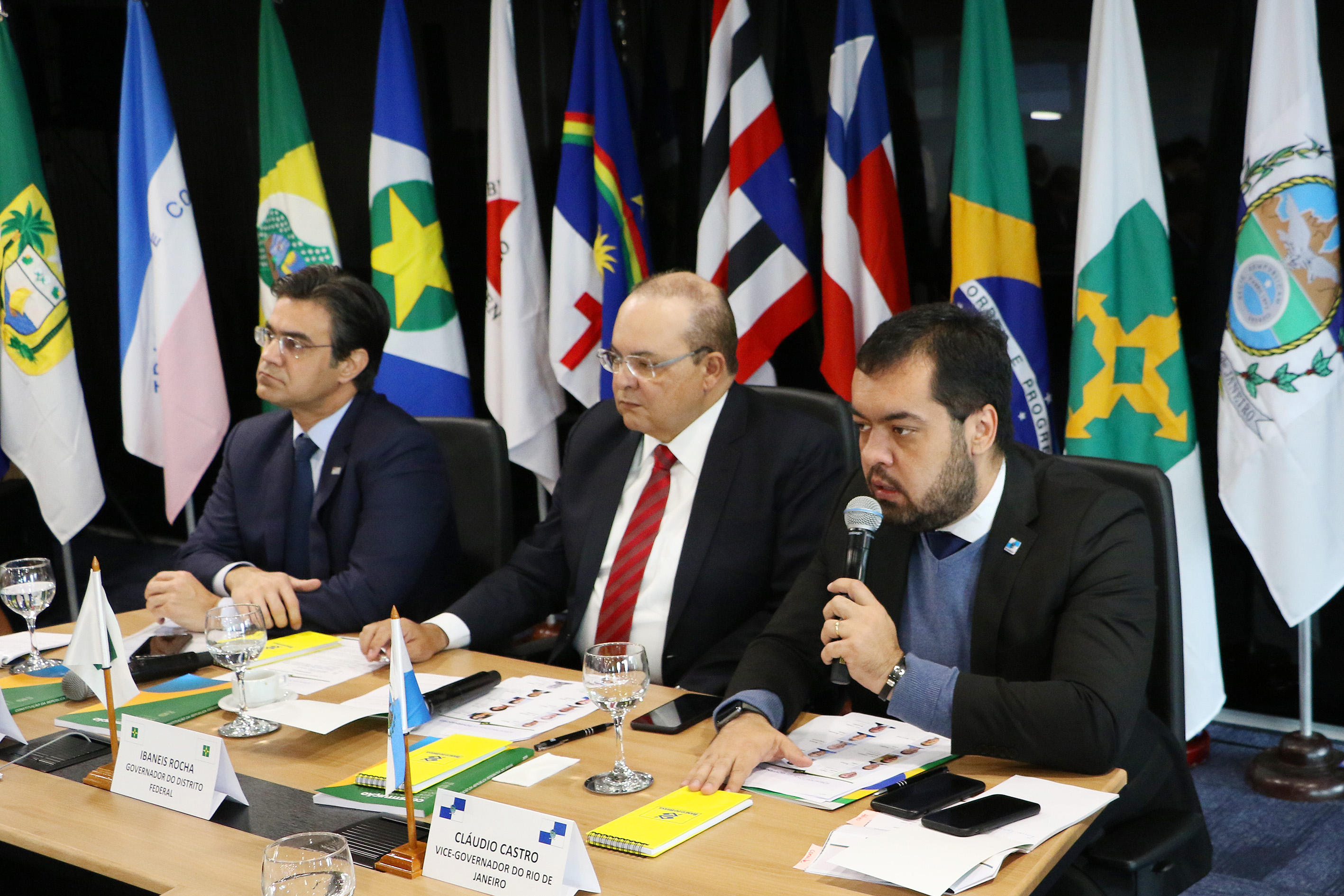
VI Governors National Forum

On 6 August 2018, the Social Christian Party (PSC) confirmed that City Councillor Cláudio Castro would be a candidate for Vice Governor of Rio de Janeiro along with federal judge Wilson Witzel, and that the party would not form any coalition.

With 59.87% (4,675,355) of the valid votes, Witzel and Castro were elected on 28 October 2018 for a four-year term, which began on 1 January 2019.

Castro was sworn in as Governor of Rio de Janeiro, after Wilson Witzel's impeachment on May 1, 2021. On 26 May 2021, Castro joined the Liberal Party. Considered a “connected man,” he changed political parties seven times.

Under his authority, the police of Rio de Janeiro is one of the most lethal police forces in the country, responsible for the deaths of 703 people in 2024, according to the Brazilian Public Security Forum. In October 2025, he ordered Operation Containment: 2,500 military and civil police officers stormed the Penha and Alemao favelas against suspected members of the Comando Vermelho, killing 120 people.

=== Accusations of corruption ===
Cláudio Castro has several times been suspected of corruption. In 2024, a federal police investigation accused him of having received 326,000 reais and 20,000 dollars in bribes in cash between 2017 and 2019. The procedure is bogged down at the Supreme Court, which ordered its suspension for judicial irregularities.

=== Electoral history ===
Year	Election	Party	Office	Coalition	Partners	Party	Votes	Percent	Result
2016	Municipal Election of Rio de Janeiro	PSC	Councillor	—N/a			10,262	0.35%	Elected
2018	State Elections of Rio de Janeiro	PSC	Vice Governor	More Order, More Progress (PSC, PROS)	Wilson Witzel	PSC	3,154,771	41.28%	Runoff
2018	State Elections of Rio de Janeiro	PSC	Vice Governor	More Order, More Progress (PSC, PROS)	Wilson Witzel	PSC	4,675,355	59.87%	Elected
2022	State Elections of Rio de Janeiro	PL	Governor	United and Stronger Rio (PL, MDB, Avante, DC, PMN, PODE, PP, PROS, PRTB, PSC, PTB, Republicanos, Solidariedade, UNIÃO)	Thiago Pampolha	UNIÃO	4,930,288	58.67%	Elected

== Notes ==
Political offices
Vacant Title last held by Francisco Dornelles	Vice Governor of Rio de Janeiro; 2019–2021; Acting Governor; 2020–2021	Vacant Title next held by Thiago Pampolha
Preceded by Wilson Witzel	Governor of Rio de Janeiro; 2021–2026	Succeeded by Ricardo Couto de Castro (interim)
