= Piraí =

Municipality in Rio de Janeiro, Brazil

- Municipality
- Município de Piraí
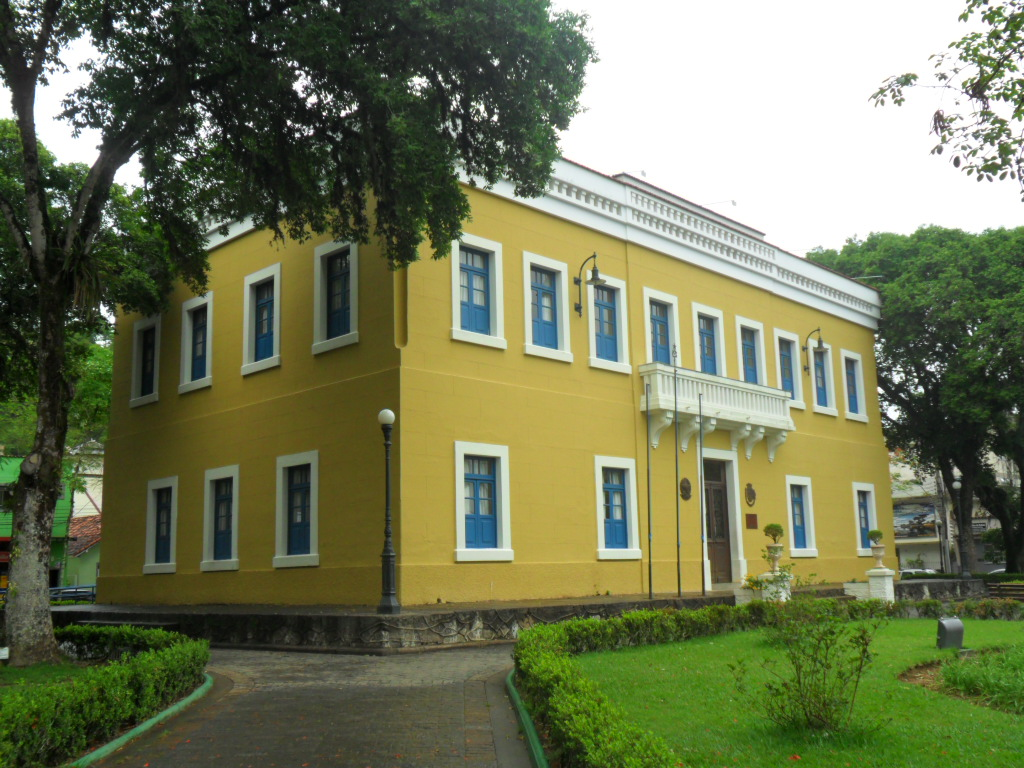
- City Hall

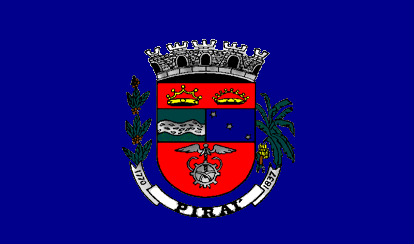
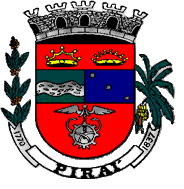
- Flag Coat of arms

- Location of Piraí in the state of Rio de Janeiro

- Location of Piraí in Brazil
- Coordinates: 22°37′44″S 43°53′52″W
- Country: Brazil
- Region: Southeast
- State: Rio de Janeiro

Government
  - Prefeito: Luiz Antônio da Silva Neves (PDT)

Area
  - Total: 505.466 km^{2} (195.162 sq mi)
- Elevation: 387 m (1,270 ft)

Population (2020)
  - Total: 29,545
- Time zone: UTC−3 (BRT)

Piraí (Portuguese pronunciation: [piɾɐˈi]) is a municipality located in the Brazilian state of Rio de Janeiro. Its population was 29,545 (2020) and its area is 505 km^{2} (195 sq mi).

== Climate ==
Climate data for Piraí (1981–2010)
Month	Jan	Feb	Mar	Apr	May	Jun	Jul	Aug	Sep	Oct	Nov	Dec	Year
Mean daily maximum °C (°F)	31.4 (88.5)	31.2 (88.2)	30.7 (87.3)	29.4 (84.9)	26.3 (79.3)	25.6 (78.1)	24.9 (76.8)	26.7 (80.1)	26.2 (79.2)	27.8 (82.0)	29.0 (84.2)	30.0 (86.0)	28.3 (82.9)
Mean daily minimum °C (°F)	19.8 (67.6)	19.8 (67.6)	19.5 (67.1)	18.0 (64.4)	15.0 (59.0)	13.1 (55.6)	12.5 (54.5)	13.3 (55.9)	15.1 (59.2)	16.5 (61.7)	17.9 (64.2)	19.4 (66.9)	16.7 (62.1)
Source: Instituto Nacional de Meteorologia
