= Luiz Fernando Pezão =

Brazilian politician

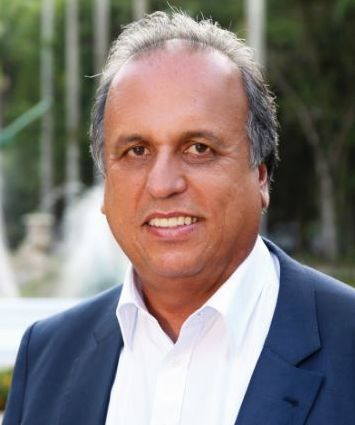

Governor of Rio de Janeiro
- In office 4 April 2014 – 1 January 2019; Suspended: 29 November 2018 – 1 January 2019
- Lieutenant: Francisco Dornelles
- Preceded by: Sérgio Cabral Filho
- Succeeded by: Francisco Dornelles (acting)

Lieutenant Governor of Rio de Janeiro
- In office 1 January 2007 – 3 April 2014
- Governor: Sérgio Cabral Filho
- Preceded by: Luiz Paulo Conde
- Succeeded by: Francisco Dornelles

Mayor of Piraí
- In office 1 January 1997 – 1 January 2005
- Preceded by: Arthur Henrique Tutuca
- Succeeded by: Arthur Henrique Tutuca

Personal details
- Born: 29 March 1958 (age 68) Piraí, Rio de Janeiro, Brazil
- Party: MDB
- Spouse: Maria Lúcia Jardim

Luiz Fernando de Souza, commonly known as Luiz Fernando Pezão or even Pezão (English: Bigfoot) (born 29 March 1958) is an entrepreneur, politician and former governor of the state of Rio de Janeiro. He was succeeded by acting Governor Francisco Dornelles from 28 March 2016 to 31 October 2016.

== Biography ==
Pezão has a degree in Administration and became a politician in the 1980s, as councillor of Piraí, Rio de Janeiro. He then served two times as mayor of the town.

In 2006, Pezão was chosen by Sérgio Cabral Filho, then candidate to the governorship of Rio de Janeiro, to be his running mate. They won the election and Pezão took office as Vice Governor and State Secretary of Public Works simultaneously.

In 2014, he assumed the office of governor due to the resignation of Sérgio Cabral Filho, that at the time had plans to run for the senate.

Pezão is a member of the Brazilian Democratic Movement, one of the most powerful political parties of the country.

He was reelected governor in the 2014 gubernatorial election, running against former governor Anthony Garotinho, and senators Lindberg Farias and Marcelo Crivella.

== Corruption arrest ==
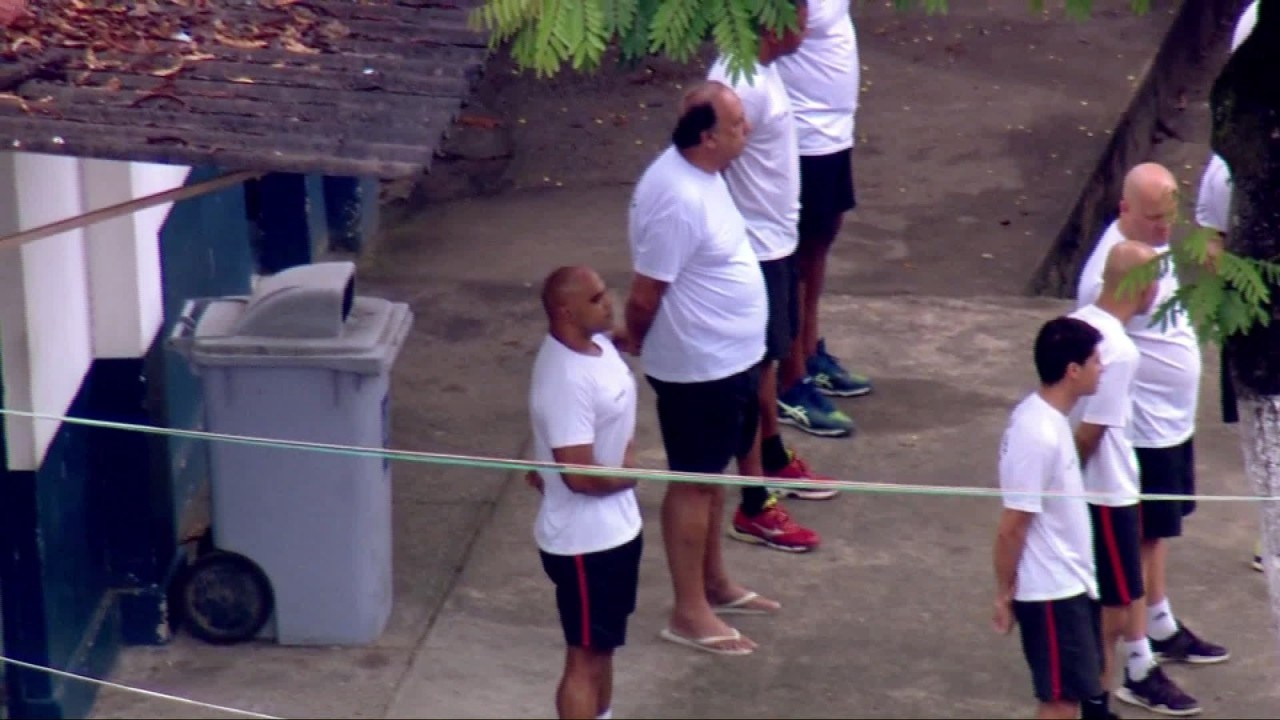
Governor Luiz Fernando Pezão, from Rio de Janeiro (Brazil), attends a flag raising ceremony while he is in jail for corruption charges.

On 29 November 2018, after a request of the Prosecutor General of the Republic Raquel Dodge, accepted by the Justice of the Superior Court of Justice Felix Fischer, Pezão was arrested by the Federal Police in a new phase of Operation Car Wash, named Operation Werewolf (Operação Boca de Lobo).

Pezão is accused of proceeding with corruption schemes that began during the government of Sérgio Cabral Filho. As his term ends on 31 December 2018, Vice Governor Francisco Dornelles took office as Acting Governor.

Political offices
Preceded by Luiz Paulo Conde	Vice Governor of Rio de Janeiro; 2007–2014	Vacant Title next held by Francisco Dornelles
Preceded by Sérgio Cabral Filho	Governor of Rio de Janeiro; 2014–2018	Succeeded by Francisco Dornelles; Acting
