= 53rd Chamber of Deputies of Brazil =

Deputies elected to the 53rd legislature (February 1, 2007 – February 1, 2010), according to the results of Brazilian general elections, 2006

State	Party	Member
Acre	PCdoB	Perpétua
Acre	PMDB	Flaviano Melo
Acre	PMN	Petecão
Acre	PP	Gladson Cameli
Acre	PPS	Ilderlei Cordeiro
Acre	PT	Fernando Melo
Acre	PT	Henrique Afonso
Acre	PT	Nilson Mourão
Alagoas	PDT	Maurício Quintela Lessa
Alagoas	PFL	Cristiano Matheus
Alagoas	PFL	Gerônimo da ADEFAL
Alagoas	PMDB	Carlos Alberto Canuto
Alagoas	PMDB	Joaquim Beltrão
Alagoas	PMDB	Olavo Calheiros
Alagoas	PMN	Francisco Tenório
Alagoas	PP	Benedito de Lira
Alagoas	PSB	Givaldo Carimbão
Amazonas	PCdoB	Vanessa Grazziotin
Amazonas	PFL	Sabino Castelo Branco
Amazonas	PMDB	Átila Lins
Amazonas	PP	Carlos Souza
Amazonas	PP	Rebecca Garcia
Amazonas	PSB	Marcelo Serafim
Amazonas	PT	Praciano
Amazonas	PTB	Silas Camara
Amapá	PCdoB	Milhomen
Amapá	PDT	Bala
Amapá	PFL	Davi Alcolumbre
Amapá	PMDB	Fátima Pelaes
Amapá	PMDB	Jurandil Juarez
Amapá	PPS	Lucenira Pimentel
Amapá	PSB	Janete 4040
Amapá	PT	Professora Dalva
Bahia	PCdoB	Alice Portugal
Bahia	PCdoB	Daniel Almeida
Bahia	PDT	Marcos Medrado
Bahia	PDT	Sérgio Brito
Bahia	PDT	Severiano Alves
Bahia	PFL	Antônio Carlos Magalhães Neto
Bahia	PFL	Cláudio Cajado
Bahia	PFL	Fábio Souto
Bahia	PFL	Félix Mendonça
Bahia	PFL	Fernando de Fabinho
Bahia	PFL	Jorge Khoury
Bahia	PFL	José Carlos Aleluia
Bahia	PFL	José Rocha
Bahia	PFL	Jusmari Oliveira
Bahia	PFL	Luiz Carreira
Bahia	PFL	Marcelo Guimarães Filho
Bahia	PFL	Paulo Magalhães
Bahia	PFL	Tonha Magalhães
Bahia	PMDB	Geddel Vieira Lima
Bahia	PP	João Leão
Bahia	PP	Mário Negromonte
Bahia	PP	Roberto Britto
Bahia	PPS	Colbert Martins
Bahia	PPS	Veloso
Bahia	PR	João Bacelar
Bahia	PR	José Carlos Araújo
Bahia	PR	Maurício Trindade
Bahia	PSB	Lídice da Mata
Bahia	PSDB	João Almeida
Bahia	PSDB	Jutahy Júnior
Bahia	PT	Geraldo Simões
Bahia	PT	Guilherme Menezes
Bahia	PT	Luiz Alberto
Bahia	PT	Luiz Bassuma
Bahia	PT	Nelson Pelegrino
Bahia	PT	Sérgio Barradas Carneiro
Bahia	PT	Walter Pinheiro
Bahia	PT	Zezéu Ribeiro
Bahia	PV	Edson Duarte
Ceará	PCdoB	Chico Lopes
Ceará	PMDB	Aníbal
Ceará	PMDB	Eunício
Ceará	PMDB	Flávio Bezerra
Ceará	PMDB	Mauro Benevides
Ceará	PMDB	Paulo Henrique Lustosa
Ceará	PMDB	Zé Gerardo
Ceará	PP	Eugênio Rabelo
Ceará	PP	Padre Zé
Ceará	PR	Gorete Pereira
Ceará	PSB	Ariosto Holanda
Ceará	PSB	Ciro Gomes
Ceará	PSDB	Leo Alcântara
Ceará	PSDB	Manoel Salviano
Ceará	PSDB	Marcelo
Ceará	PSDB	Raimundo Gomes de Matos
Ceará	PSDB	Vicente Arruda
Ceará	PT	Eudes Xavier
Ceará	PT	José Airton
Ceará	PT	Guimarães
Ceará	PT	Pimentel
Ceará	PTB	Arnon Bezerra
Distrito Federal	PMDB	Laerte Bessa
Distrito Federal	PMDB	Tadeu Filippelli
Distrito Federal	PFL	Alberto Fraga
Distrito Federal	PFL	Bispo Rodovalho
Distrito Federal	PPS	Augusto Carvalho
Distrito Federal	PR	Jofran Frejat
Distrito Federal	PSB	Rodrigo Rollemberg
Distrito Federal	PT	Geraldo Magela
Espírito Santo	PDT	Manato
Espírito Santo	PDT	Sueli Vidigal
Espírito Santo	PMDB	Camilo Cola
Espírito Santo	PMDB	Lelo Coimbra
Espírito Santo	PMDB	Rita Camata
Espírito Santo	PMDB	Rose de Freitas
Espírito Santo	PR	Neucimar Fraga
Espírito Santo	PSC	Jurandyr Loureiro
Espírito Santo	PSDB	Luiz Paulo
Espírito Santo	PT	Iriny Lopes
Goiás	PFL	Ronaldo Caiado
Goiás	PMDB	Bittencourt
Goiás	PMDB	Dona Iris
Goiás	PMDB	Leandro Vilela
Goiás	PMDB	Marcelo Melo
Goiás	PMDB	Pedro Chaves
Goiás	PP	Roberto Balestra
Goiás	PP	Sandes Júnior
Goiás	PR	Sandro Mabel
Goiás	PSDB	Carlos Alberto Leréia
Goiás	PSDB	João Campos
Goiás	PSDB	Leonardo Vilela
Goiás	PSDB	Professora Raquel Teixeira
Goiás	PT	Pedro Wilson
Goiás	PT	Rubens Otoni
Goiás	PTB	Jovair Arantes
Goiás	PTB	Tatico
Maranhão	PCdoB	Flávio Dino
Maranhão	PDT	Davi Alves Silva Júnior
Maranhão	PDT	Julião Amin
Maranhão	PFL	Clovis Fecury
Maranhão	PFL	Nice Lobão
Maranhão	PMDB	Gastão Vieira
Maranhão	PMDB	Pedro Novais
Maranhão	PMDB	Professor Sétimo Waquim
Maranhão	PSB	Dr. Ribamar Alves
Maranhão	PSB	Waldir Maranhão
Maranhão	PSDB	Carlos Brandão
Maranhão	PSDB	Pinto da Itamaraty
Maranhão	PSDB	Roberto Rocha
Maranhão	PSDB	Sebastião Madeira
Maranhão	PT	Dutra
Maranhão	PTB	Cléber Verde
Maranhão	PTB	Pedro Fernandes
Maranhão	PV	Sarney Filho
Mato Grosso	PMDB	Carlos Bezerra
Mato Grosso	PP	Eliene Lima
Mato Grosso	PP	Pedro Henry
Mato Grosso	PPS	Homero Pereira
Mato Grosso	PR	Welinton
Mato Grosso	PSB	Valtenir Pereira
Mato Grosso	PSDB	Thelma de Oliveira
Mato Grosso	PT	Carlos Abicalil
Mato Grosso do Sul	PDT	Dagoberto Nogueira
Mato Grosso do Sul	PMDB	Moka
Mato Grosso do Sul	PMDB	Nelson Trad
Mato Grosso do Sul	PP	Dr. Antonio Cruz
Mato Grosso do Sul	PPS	Geraldo Resende
Mato Grosso do Sul	PSDB	Waldir Neves
Mato Grosso do Sul	PT	Biffi
Mato Grosso do Sul	PT	Vander Loubet
Minas Gerais	PCdoB	Jô Moraes
Minas Gerais	PDT	Ademir Camilo
Minas Gerais	PDT	Mário Heringer
Minas Gerais	PFL	Carlos Melles
Minas Gerais	PFL	Edmar Moreira
Minas Gerais	PFL	Jairo Ataide
Minas Gerais	PFL	João Bittar
Minas Gerais	PFL	Lael Varella
Minas Gerais	PFL	Marcos Montes
Minas Gerais	PFL	Vitor Penido
Minas Gerais	PHS	Miguel Martini
Minas Gerais	PMDB	Antônio Andrade
Minas Gerais	PMDB	Fernando Diniz
Minas Gerais	PMDB	João Magalhães
Minas Gerais	PMDB	Leonardo Quintão
Minas Gerais	PMDB	Maria Lúcia Cardoso
Minas Gerais	PMDB	Mauro Lopes
Minas Gerais	PMDB	Saraiva Felipe
Minas Gerais	PP	George Hilton
Minas Gerais	PP	Luiz Fernando Faria
Minas Gerais	PP	Márcio Reinaldo Moreira
Minas Gerais	PR	Aelton Freitas
Minas Gerais	PR	Aracely de Paula
Minas Gerais	PR	Bilac Pinto
Minas Gerais	PR	Jaime Martins
Minas Gerais	PR	José Santana de Vasconcelos
Minas Gerais	PR	Lincoln Portela
Minas Gerais	PPS	Alexandre Silveira
Minas Gerais	PPS	Geraldo Thadeu
Minas Gerais	PPS	Humberto Souto
Minas Gerais	PPS	Paulo Piau
Minas Gerais	PSB	Júlio Delgado
Minas Gerais	PSC	Mário de Oliveira
Minas Gerais	PSDB	Bonifácio de Andrada
Minas Gerais	PSDB	Eduardo Barbosa
Minas Gerais	PSDB	Narcio Rodrigues
Minas Gerais	PSDB	Paulo Abi-Ackel
Minas Gerais	PSDB	Rafael Guerra
Minas Gerais	PSDB	Rodrigo de Castro
Minas Gerais	PT	Elismar Prado
Minas Gerais	PT	Gilmar Machado
Minas Gerais	PT	Juvenil Alves
Minas Gerais	PT	Leonardo Monteiro
Minas Gerais	PT	Maria do Carmo Lara
Minas Gerais	PT	Miguel Côrrea Jr
Minas Gerais	PT	Odair Cunha
Minas Gerais	PT	Reginaldo Lopes
Minas Gerais	PT	Virgílio Guimarães
Minas Gerais	PTC	Carlos Willian
Minas Gerais	PV	Antônio Roberto
Minas Gerais	PV	Ciro Pedrosa
Minas Gerais	PV	Fábio Ramalho
Minas Gerais	PV	José Fernando Aparecido de Oliveira
Pará	PDT	Giovanni Queiroz
Pará	PFL	Lira Maia
Pará	PFL	Vic Pires Franco
Pará	PMDB	Asdrubal Bentes
Pará	PMDB	Bel Mesquita
Pará	PMDB	Elcione Barbalho
Pará	PMDB	Jader Barbalho
Pará	PMDB	Lúcio Vale
Pará	PMDB	Wladimir Costa
Pará	PP	Gerson Peres
Pará	PSC	Zequinha Marinho
Pará	PSDB	Nilson Pinto
Pará	PSDB	Wandenkolk (Vandinho) Gonçalves
Pará	PSDB	Zenaldo Coutinho
Pará	PT	Beto
Pará	PT	Paulo Rocha
Pará	PT	Zé Geraldo
Paraíba	PFL	Efraim Filho
Paraíba	PMDB	Vitalzinho
Paraíba	PMDB	Wilson Braga
Paraíba	PMDB	Wilson Santiago
Paraíba	PR	Dr. Damião
Paraíba	PR	Wellington Roberto
Paraíba	PSB	Manoel Júnior
Paraíba	PSB	Marcondes Gadelha
Paraíba	PSDB	Armando Abílio
Paraíba	PSDB	Rômulo Gouveia
Paraíba	PSDB	Ronaldo Cunha Lima
Paraíba	PT	Luiz Couto

Preceded by 52nd	53rd Chamber of Deputies of Brazil; February 1, 2007	Succeeded by 54th
