= Evangelical Parliamentary Front =

Brazilian loose political grouping

Evangelical Parliamentary Front Frente Parlamentar Evangélica
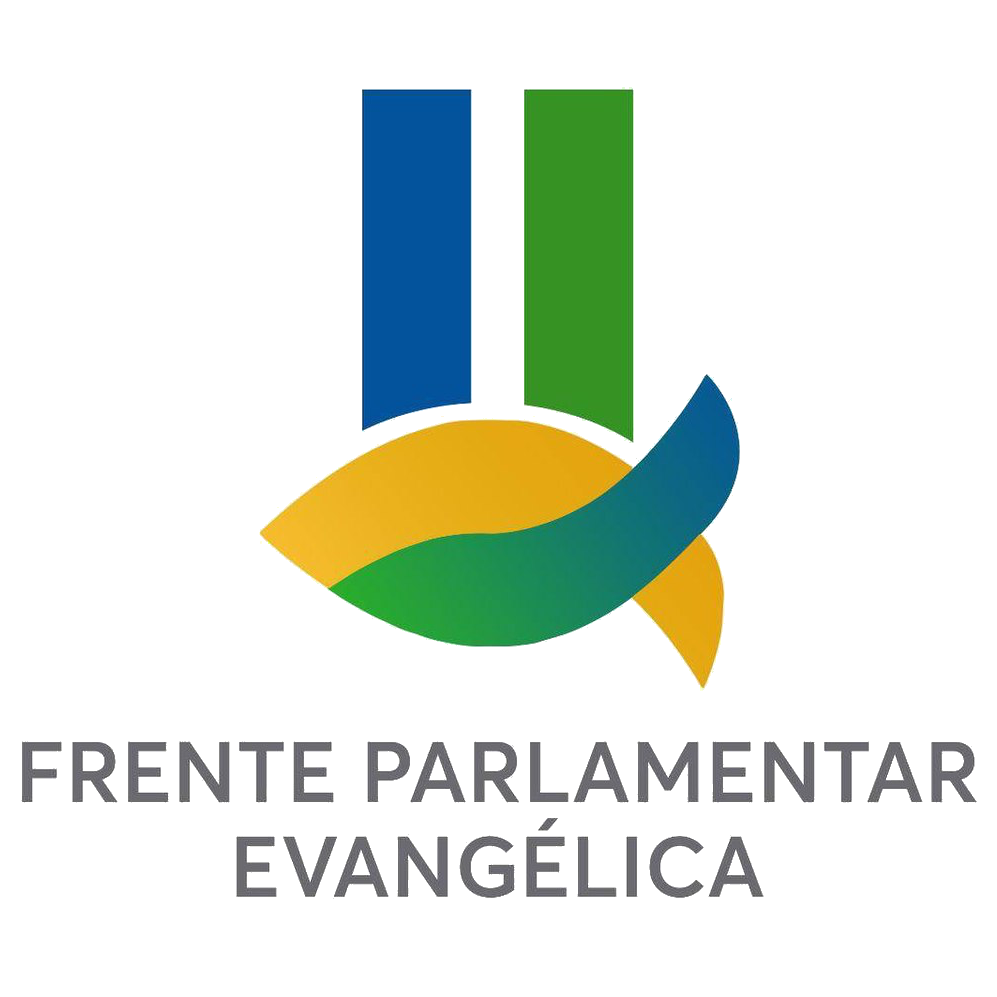
- President: Gilberto Nascimento (PSD)
- Registered: 9 September 2015
- Ideology: Social conservatism Christian right
- Political position: Right-wing
- Federal Senate: 26 / 81
- Chamber of Deputies: 213 / 513

The Evangelical Parliamentary Front or the Evangelical Caucus (known in Portuguese as Frente Parlamentar Evangélica and Bancada Evangélica respectively) is a loosely organized group of Evangelical lawmakers in the Brazilian government and legislature.

If considered a political party, the Evangelical Caucus would be the third largest in the Brazilian government, surpassed only by the Brazilian Democratic Movement and the Workers' Party. It is a prominent feature of Conservatism in Brazil.

== History ==
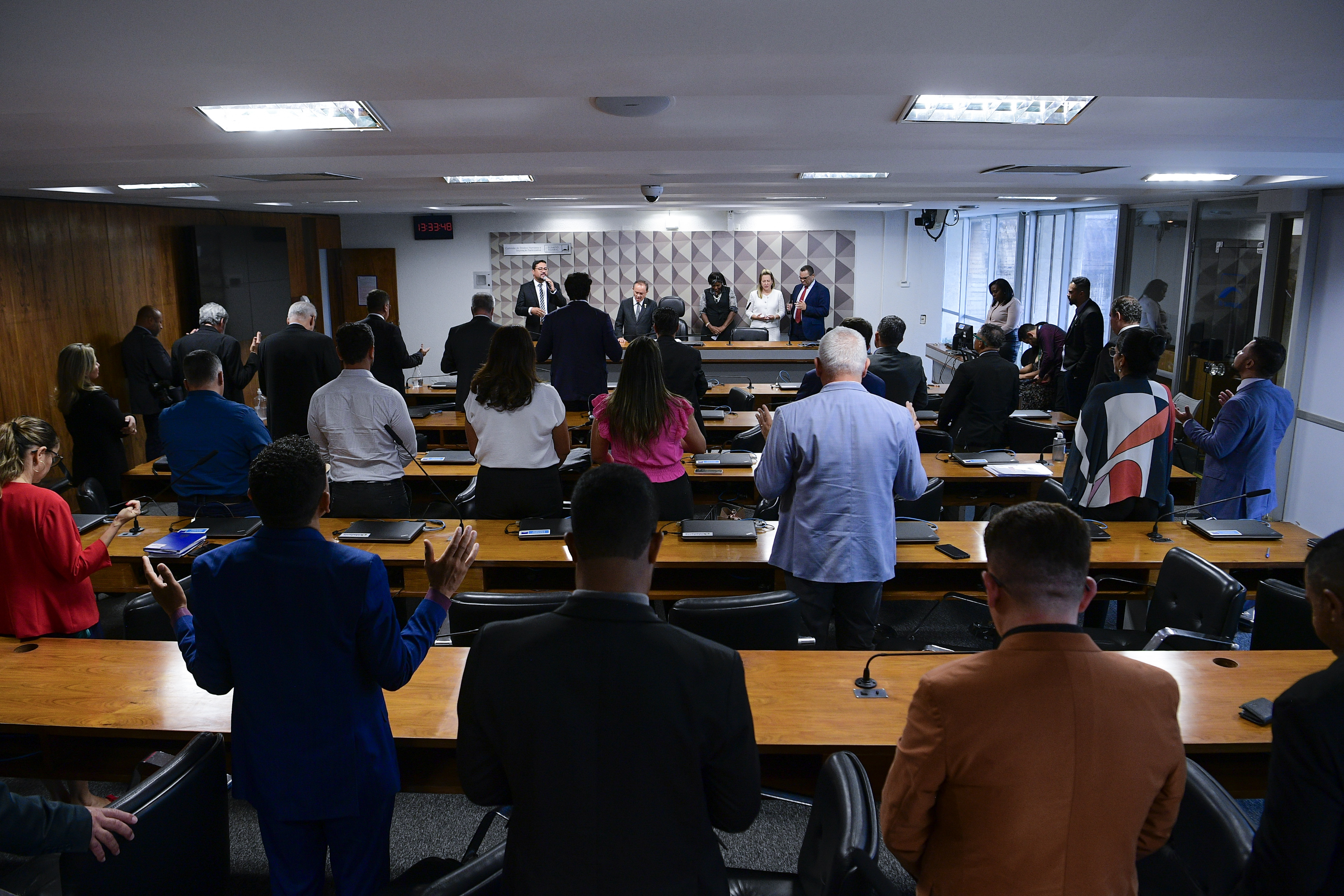
Meeting of the Evangelical Parliamentary Front at the National Congress Palace in Brasília, Brazil, 2023

The Evangelical Parliamentary Front was founded in 2003 to bring together Evangelical parliamentarians, from all political parties, at the National Congress Palace in Brasília, Brazil.

The regularization of the FPE on the board of directors of the Chamber of Deputies only occurred on November 9, 2015, motivated by the exponential growth of the bench, a process that began with the significant election of 60 federal deputies who declared themselves evangelicals in the 2002 election.

== Leadership ==
The evangelical caucus has no formalized leadership; however João Campos de Araújo, Anthony Garotinho, Eduardo Cunha, Lincoln Portela, and Magno Malta were considered the unofficial leaders of the caucus in 2013.

== Membership ==
The Evangelical Caucus of Brazil has no defined standard of membership but is generally open to all Protestant lawmakers in the Brazilian legislature, including mainline denominations as well as members of evangelical and Pentecostal movements.

The caucus was formed especially because Brazil's fast growing Protestant population was underrepresented in government, and as is the norm Catholic and non-religious politicians are not allowed to be members. Converative Catholic politicians are usually not considered to be part of the evangelical caucus, certain politicians such as Hugo Leal and Jair Bolsonaro often collaborate with the caucus.

Although the Evangelical Caucus is often perceived by the media, its members, and supporters to be conservative/right wing, it is worth noting that a few members are affiliated with left-wing politics in Brazil, such as Benedita da Silva, Marina Silva, and Walter Pinheiro.

== Influence on politics ==
The evangelical front is often seen as part of the rising Evangelical influence in politics in Latin America. The evangelical vote was seen as key in the Impeachment of Dilma Rousseff and the election of Jair Bolsonaro in the 2018 election.

== Prominent members ==
=== Senate of Brazil ===
The following past and present members of the Brazilian Senate that are/were affiliated with the Evangelical caucus

image	Name	term	state	party	denomination	reference
	Marina Silva	1995–2003; 2008–2011	Acre	PT; PV	Assembleias de Deus	
	Benedita da Silva	1995–1998	Rio de Janeiro	PT	Assembleias de Deus	
	Magno Malta	2003–2019	Espírito Santo	PR	non-denominational Evangelical	
	Marcelo Crivella	2003–2018	Rio de Janeiro	PRB	Universal Church of the Kingdom of God	
	Walter Pinheiro	2011–2016	Bahia	PT	Baptists	
	Eduardo Lopes	2012–2014; 2016–2019	Rio de Janeiro	PRB	Universal Church of the Kingdom of God	
	Guaracy Silveira	2018–2019	Tocantins	PSL	International Church of the Foursquare Gospel	
	Zequinha Marinho	2019–	Pará	PSC	Assembleias de Deus	
	Marcos Rogério	2019–	Rondônia	DEM	Assembleias de Deus	
	Eliziane Gama	2019–	Maranhão	PPS	Assembleias de Deus	
	Arolde de Oliveira	2019–2020	Rio de Janeiro	PSD	Baptists	
	Flávio Bolsonaro	2019–	Rio de Janeiro	PSL	Baptists	
	Mecias de Jesus	2019–	Roraima	PRB	Nova Vida Baptist church	
	Luis Carlos Heinze	2019–	Rio Grande do Sul	PP	Evangelical Lutheran Church of Brazil	

=== Chamber of Deputies ===
The following past and present members of the Chamber of Deputies that are/were affiliated with the Evangelical caucus

image	Name	term	state	party	denomination	reference
	Arolde de Oliveira	1984–2019	Rio de Janeiro	PSD	Baptists	
	Flávio Rocha	1984–1995	Rio Grande do Norte	PTC	Comunidade Evangélica Sara Nossa Terra	
	Benedita da Silva	1987–1995; 2011–	Rio de Janeiro	PT	Assembleias de Deus	
	Marina Silva	1991–1995	Acre	PT	Assembleias de Deus	
	Moroni Torgan	1991–1995; 2015–2019	Ceará	DEM	The Church of Jesus Christ of Latter-day Saints	
	Edson Coelho Araújo	1995–2001; 2011–2017	São Paulo	PDMB	Presbyterian Church of Brazil	
	Walter Pinheiro	1997–2011	Bahia	PT	Baptists	
	Magno Malta	1999–2003	Espírito Santo	PR	non-denominational Evangelical	
	Luis Carlos Heinze	1999–2018	Rio Grande do Sul	PP	Evangelical Lutheran Church of Brazil	
	Silas Câmara	1999–	Amazonas	various	Assembleias de Deus	
	Lincoln Portela	1999–	Minas Gerais	PRB	Solidarity Baptist Church	
	Josué Bengtson	1999–2007	Pará	PTB	International Church of the Foursquare Gospel	
	Carlos Manato	2001–2019	Espírito Santo	PDT	Igreja Cristã Maranata	
	Jefferson Alves de Campos	2002–2006; 2008–	São Paulo	PSD; PSB	International Church of the Foursquare Gospel	
	Zequinha Marinho	2003–2015	Pará	PSC	Assembleias de Deus	
	Onyx Lorenzoni	2003–2019	Rio Grande do Sul	DEM	Evangelical Lutheran Church of Brazil	
	Jorge Tadeu Mudalen	2003–2019	São Paulo	DEM; PMDB	International Grace of God Church	
	Eduardo Cunha	2003–2019	Rio de Janeiro	PMDB	Comunidade Evangélica Sara Nossa Terra	
	Gilberto Nascimento	2003–2007; 2015–	São Paulo	PSC	Assembleias de Deus	
	João Campos de Araújo	2003–	Goiás	PRB	Assembleias de Deus	
	Hidekazu Takayama	2003–	Paraná	PSC	Assembleias de Deus	
	Antonio Bulhões	2007–	São Paulo	PRB	Universal Church of the Kingdom of God	
	Vinicius Carvalho	2007–2011; 2014–	São Paulo	PRB	Universal Church of the Kingdom of God	
	Cléber Verde	2008–	Maranhão	PRB	Assembleias de Deus	
	Paulo Freire Costa	2008–	São Paulo	PR	Assembleias de Deus	
	Márcio Marinho	2008–	Bahia	PRB	Universal Church of the Kingdom of God	
	Marco Feliciano	2011–	Rio de Janeiro	PODE; PSC	Assembleias de Deus; Cathedral of Avivamento/Gideões Missionários da Última Hora	
	Pastor Eurico	2011–	Pernambuco	PATRI; PHS	Assembleias de Deus	
	Aguinaldo Ribeiro	2011–	Paraíba	PP	Brazilian Baptist Convention	
	João Henrique Caldas	2011–	Alagoas	PSB	International Grace of God Church	
	Laercio Oliveira	2011–	Sergipe	PP	Presbyterian Church of Brazil	
	Ronaldo Fonseca	2011–2018	Distrito Federal	PODE; PROS; PR	Assembleias de Deus	
	Edmar Arruda	2011–2019	Paraná	PSD; PSC	Independent Presbyterian Church of Brazil	
	Francisco Floriano	2011–2015	Rio de Janeiro	DEM; PR	Universal Church of God's Power	
	Anthony Garotinho	2011–2015	Rio de Janeiro	PR; PRB	Presbyterian	
	Missionário José Olimpio	2011–2018	São Paulo	DEM; PR	Universal Church of God's Power	
	Fernando Francischini	2011–2019	Paraná	SD; PSL	Assembleias de Deus	
	Bruna Furlan	2011–	São Paulo	PSDB	Christian Congregation in Brazil	
	Clarissa Garotinho	2015–	Rio de Janeiro	PR; PRB; PROS	Presbyterian	
	Ronaldo Nogueira	2015–	Rio Grande do Sul	PTB	Assembleias de Deus	
	Alexandre Serfiotis	2015–	Rio de Janeiro	PMDB	Fazei Discípulos Apostolic Church	
	Áureo Lídio Moreira Ribeiro	2015–	Rio de Janeiro	SD	Methodist Church in Brazil	
	Ezequiel Teixeira	2015–2019	Rio de Janeiro	SD	Projeto Vida Nova	
	Tia Eron	2015–2017	Bahia	PRB	Universal Church of the Kingdom of God	
	Rosângela Gomes	2015–	Rio de Janeiro	PRB	Universal Church of the Kingdom of God	
	Sóstenes Cavalcante	2015–	Rio de Janeiro	DEM	Assembleias de Deus	
	Johnathan de Jesus	2015–	Roraima	PRB	Nova Vida Baptist church	
	Geovânia de Sá	2015–	Santa Catarina	PSDB	Assembleias de Deus	
	Stefano Aguiar	2015–	Minas Gerais	PSD	International Church of the Foursquare Gospel	
	Jony Marcos	2015–	Sergipe	PRB	Universal Church of the Kingdom of God	
	Alan Rick Miranda	2015–	Acre	DEM; PRB	Forest Evangelical Baptist Church	
	Lucio Mosquini	2015–	Rondônia	MDB	Brazilian Baptist Convention	
	Toninho Wandscheer	2015–	Paraná	PROS	Assembleias de Deus	
	Antônio Jácome	2015–2018	Rio Grande do Norte	PODE; PMN	Assembleias de Deus	
	Lindomar Garçon	2015–2019	Rondônia	PRB; MDB	Assembleias de Deus	
	Franklin Lima	2015–2019	Minas Gerais	PP	Universal Church of God's Power	
	Fábio Fernandes de Sousa	2015–	Goiás	PSDB	Igreja Fonte da Vida	
	Christiane Yared	2015–	Paraná	PR	Catedral do Reino de Deus	
	Altineu Côrtes	2015–	Rio de Janeiro	PR	Assembleias de Deus	
	Fausto Pinato	2015–	São Paulo	PP; PRB	Christian Congregation in Brazil	
	Liziane Bayer	2019–	Rio Grande do Sul	PSB	International Grace of God Church	
	Manuel Marcos	2019–	Acre	PRB	Universal Church of the Kingdom of God	
	Marcos Pereira	2019–	São Paulo	PRB	Universal Church of the Kingdom of God	
	Felipe Francischini	2019–	Paraná	PSL	Assembleias de Deus	
	Otoni de Paula	2019–	Rio de Janeiro	PSC	Assembleias de Deus	

== See also ==
- Conservatism in Brazil
- Evangelical political parties in Latin America
