= Evandro =

Evandro is a male given name.

It originates from the Latin Evander, from Ancient Greek Εὔανδρος (Eúandros, literally “good man”).

Notable people with the name include:

- Evandro Agazzi (born 1934), Italian philosopher
- Evandro Chagas (1905–1940), Brazilian physician and biomedical scientist specializing in tropical medicine
- Evandro Garla (born 1978), Brazilian politician
- Evandro Soldati (born 1985), Brazilian male model
- Evandro (footballer, born 1974), Evandro Carlos Escardalete, Brazilian football forward
- Evandro Gama do Nascimento Alexandre (born 1970), Brazilian football attacking midfielder
- Evandro Adauto da Silva (born 1980), Brazilian footballer
- Evandro (footballer, born 1985), Evandro Russo Ramos, Brazilian football forward
- Evandro Roncatto (born 1986), Brazilian footballer
- Evandro (footballer, born 1986), Evandro Goebel, Brazilian football attacking midfielder
- Evandro (footballer, born May 1986), Evandro Silva Resende, Brazilian football striker
- Evandro Teixeira Magalhães (born 1986), Brazilian footballer
- Evandro Silva do Nascimento (born 1987), Brazilian footballer known as "Evandro Paulista"
- Evandro Oliveira (born 1990), Brazilian beach volleyball player
- Evandro (footballer, born 1993), Evandro Rodrigues Florêncio, Brazilian football midfielder
- Evandro (footballer, born 1997), Evandro da Silva, Brazilian football forward
- Evandro Cardoso Almeida Filho (born 1983), Evandro Almeida, Brazilian American, Oregon Army National Guard Veteran

== See also ==
- Evandro Almeida Stadium, usually known as Baenão, a multi-use stadium in Belém, Pará, Brazil
- Rocca d'Evandro, a comune in Italy
