= Rebecca Garcia =

Rebecca Garcia may refer to:

- Rebecca Garcia (computer programmer), American computer programmer
- Rebecca Garcia (politician) (born 1973), Brazilian economist and politician
