= Jony Marcos =

Brazilian politician

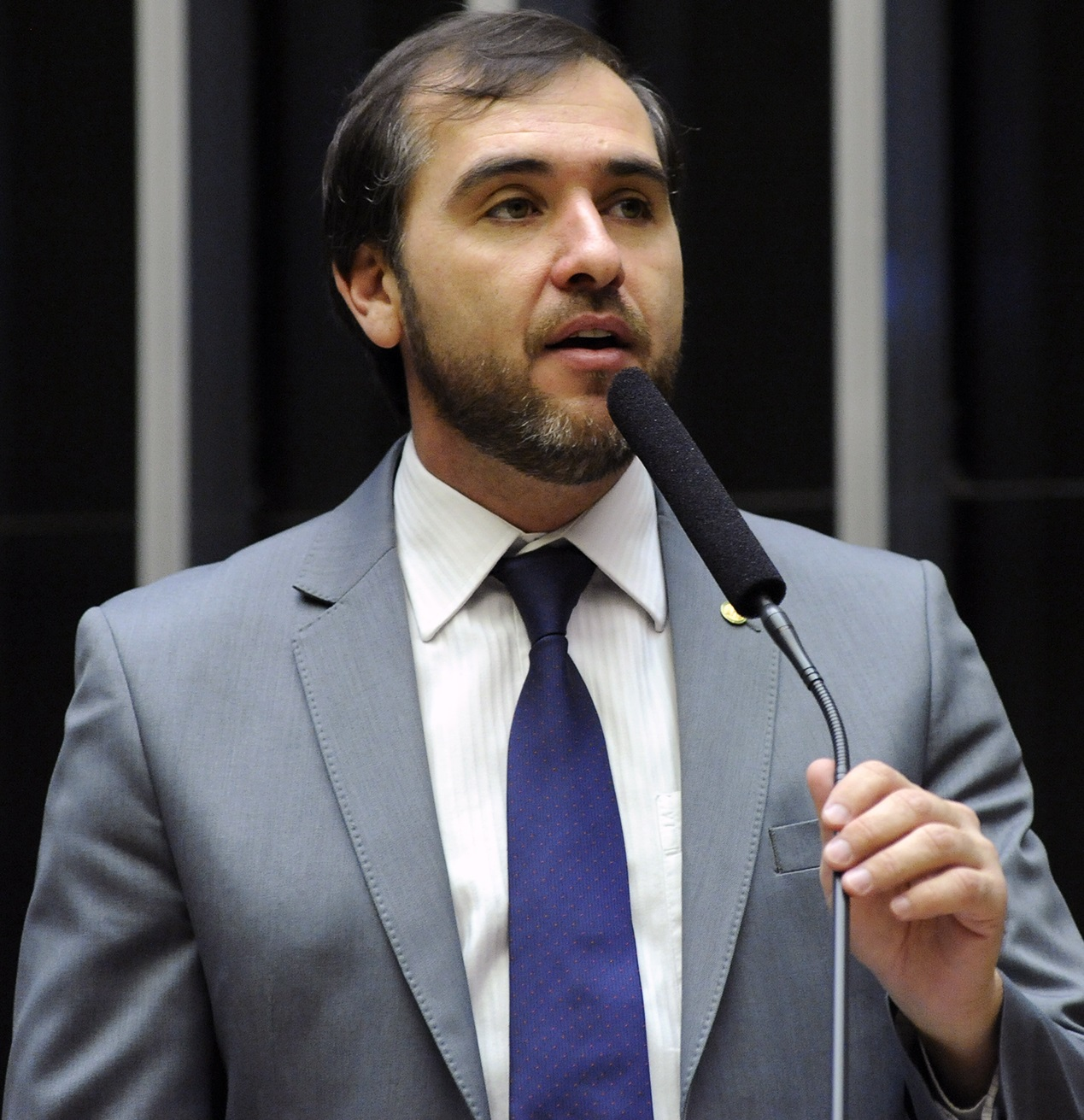
- Jony Marcos in June 2017

Federal Deputy for Sergipe
- Incumbent
- Assumed office 1 February 2015

Vereador of Aracaju
- In office 2002–2014

Personal details
- Born: 30 September 1970 (age 56) Ponta Porã, Brazil
- Party: PRB

Jony Marcos de Souza Araujo (born 30 September 1977) more commonly known as Jony Marcos and Pastor Jony is a Brazilian politician and pastor. Although born in Mato Grosso do Sul, he has spent his political career representing Sergipe, having served as state representative since 2015.

== Personal life ==
Jony Marcos was born to João Feliciano Rodrigues de Araújo and Eva de Souza Araújo. Prior to becoming a politician Jony Marcos worked as a radio personality, and he still maintains a radio talk show. He is a pastor of the Universal Church of the Kingdom of God. He is a member of the evangelical caucus in the legislature.

== Political career ==
Jony Marcos voted in favor of the impeachment motion of then-president Dilma Rousseff. He would later vote in favor of opening a similar corruption investigation against Rousseff's successor Michel Temer, and voted against the 2017 Brazilian labor reforms.
