= Franciane Bayer =

Brazilian politician (born 1987)

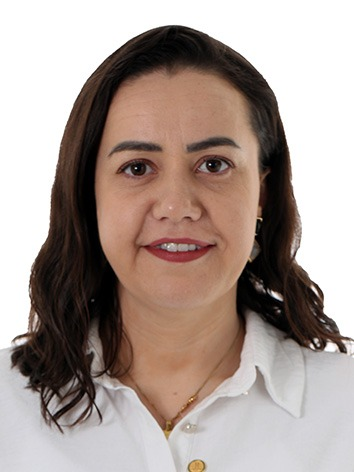
- Franciane Bayer

Member of the Chamber of Deputies
- Incumbent
- Assumed office 1 February 2023
- Constituency: Rio Grande do Sul

Personal details
- Born: 9 October 1987 (age 38)
- Party: Republicans (since 2022)
- Relatives: Liziane Bayer (sister)

Franciane Abade Bayer Muller (born 9 October 1987) is a Brazilian politician serving as a member of the Chamber of Deputies since 2023. From 2019 to 2022, she was a member of the Legislative Assembly of Rio Grande do Sul. She is the sister of Liziane Bayer.

Currently she is serving her first term as a federal deputy for Rio Grande do Sul.
