= Paulo Bauer =

Brazilian politician and lawyer

Paulo Roberto Bauer
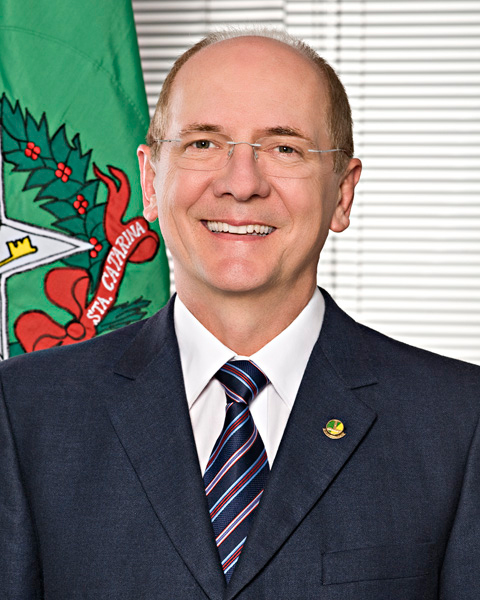

Senator for Santa Catarina
- In office February 1, 2011 – February 1, 2019

Vice-President of PSDB
- Incumbent
- Assumed office 9 December 2017 Serving with Marconi Perillo, Ricardo Tripoli, Flexa Ribeiro, Shéridan Oliveira, Carlos Sampaio, Aloysio Nunes
- President: Geraldo Alckmin

Deputy from Santa Catarina
- In office February 1, 2003 – January 31, 2007

Vice-Governor of Santa Catarina
- In office January 1, 1999 – January 1, 2003

Deputy from Santa Catarina
- In office February 1, 1991 – January 1, 1999

Personal details
- Born: March 20, 1957 (age 69) Blumenau, Santa Catarina
- Party: PSDB
- Children: 5
- Profession: Lawyer

Paulo Roberto Bauer (born March 20, 1957) is a Brazilian politician. He has represented Santa Catarina in the Federal Senate since 2011. Previously he was a deputy from Santa Catarina from 1991 to 1999 and from 2003 to 2007. He was vice-governor of Santa Catarina from 1999 to 2003. He is a member of the Brazilian Social Democracy Party.
