= Zequinha (disambiguation) =

Zequinha (1935-2009), born Jose Ferreira Franco, was a Brazilian football midfielder

Zequinha may also refer to:

- Zequinha de Abreu (1880-1935), Brazilian musician and composer
- Zequinha (footballer, born 1948), born José Márcio Pereira da Silva, Brazilian football forward
- Zequinha Marinho (born 1959), Brazilian politician
- Zequinha (footballer, born 1987), born José Egas dos Santos Branco, Portuguese football forward
