= Antônia Lúcia =

Brazilian politician (born 1970)

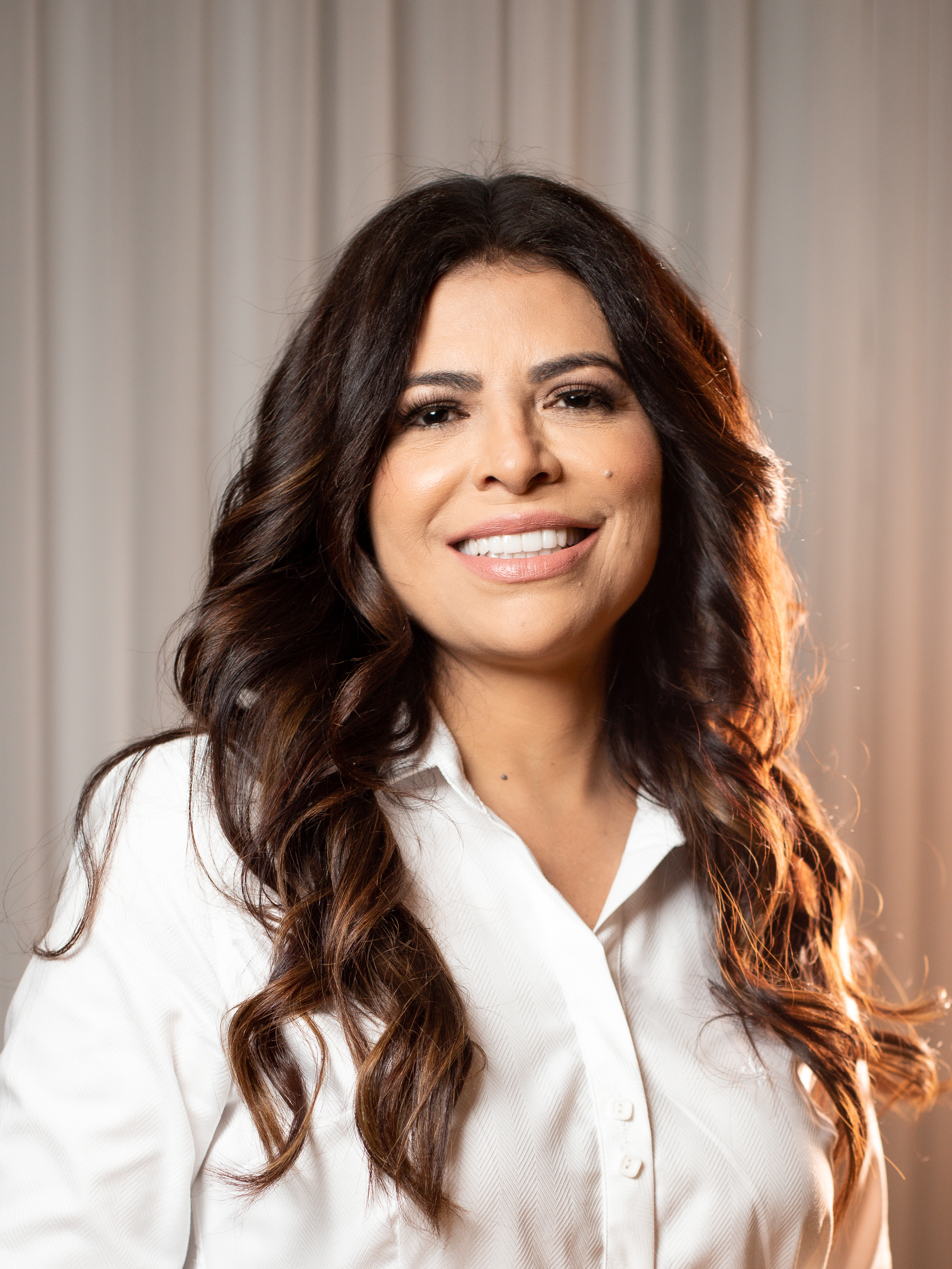
- Lúcia in 2022

Member of the Chamber of Deputies
- Incumbent
- Assumed office 1 February 2023
- Constituency: Acre
- In office 1 February 2011 – 31 January 2015
- Constituency: Acre

Personal details
- Born: 17 July 1970 (age 56)
- Party: Republicans (since 2022)
- Spouse: Silas Câmara

Antônia Luciléia Cruz Ramos Câmara, better known as Antônia Lúcia (born 17 July 1970), is a Brazilian politician. She has been a member of the Chamber of Deputies since 2023, having previously served from 2011 to 2015. She is married to Silas Câmara.
