= Rebeca Garcia (disambiguation) =

Rebecca Garcia (politician), sometimes mis-spelled Rebeca, is a Brazilian economist and politician.

Rebeca Garcia may also refer to:

- Rebeca Garcia (figure skater), Spanish competitor in the 2002 World Junior Figure Skating Championships
- Rebeca Garcia (gymnast), Spanish gymnast in the 2008 Rhythmic Gymnastics European Championships
- Rebeca García (swimmer), Mexican competitor in the 1959 Central American and Caribbean Games
