= Geovânia de Sá =

Brazilian politician

Geovania de Sá
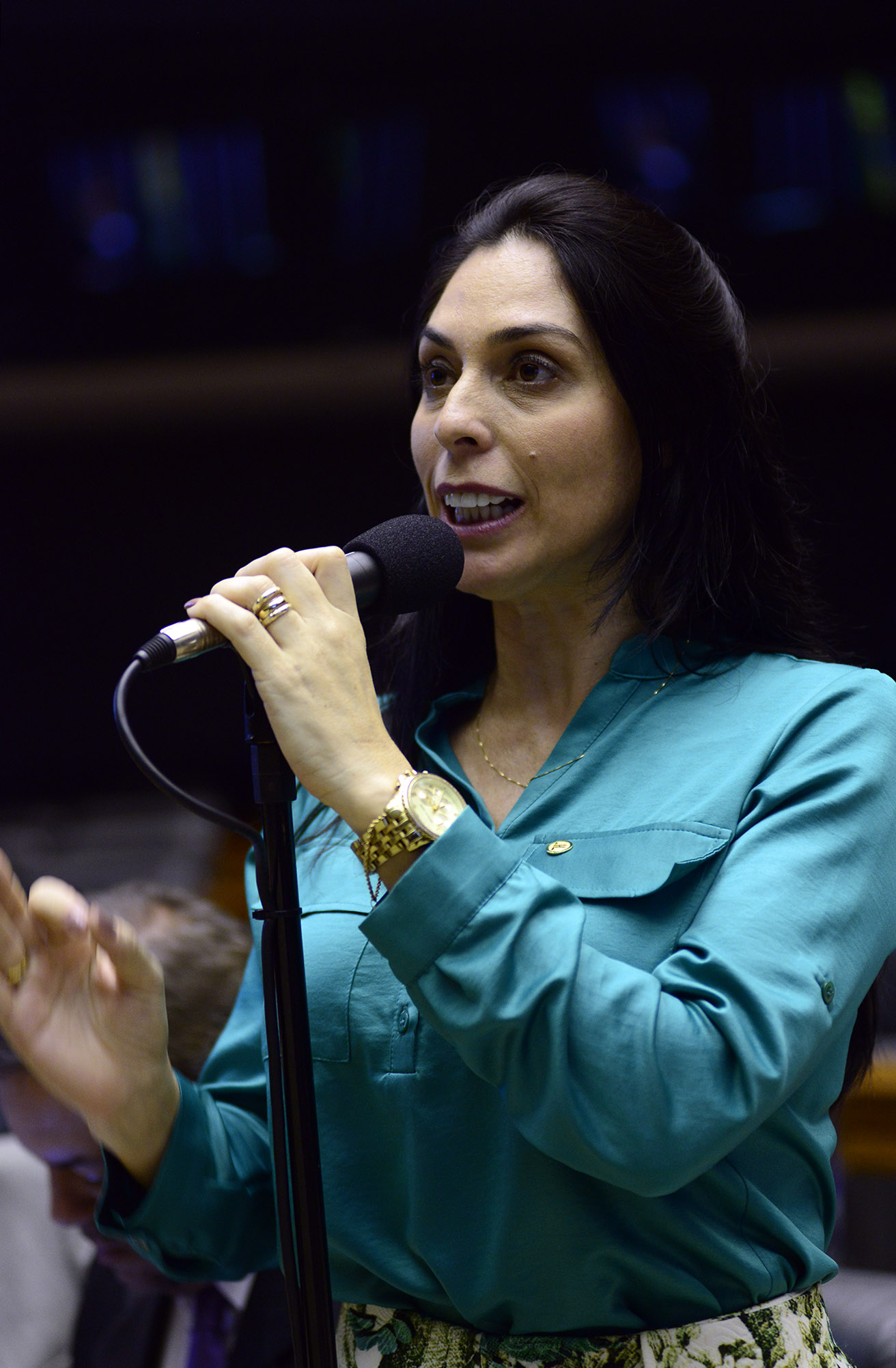
- De Sá in October 2015

Member of the Chamber of Deputies
- Incumbent
- Assumed office 1 February 2015
- Constituency: Santa Catarina

Personal details
- Born: 30 March 1972 (age 54) Criciúma, Santa Catarina, Brazil
- Party: Republicanos (2026–present)
- Other political affiliations: PSC (2000–2011); PSDB (2011–2026)

Geovânia de Sá (born 30 March 1972) is a Brazilian politician and business administrator. She has spent her political career representing Santa Catarina, having served as state representative since 2015.

== Personal life ==
She is the daughter of Itaci de Sá and Maria Elena Gonçalves. de Sá is a member of the Pentecostal church Assembleias de Deus, and is a member of the evangelical caucus in the legislature.

== Political career ==
de Sá voted in favor of the impeachment motion of then-president Dilma Rousseff. de Sá would vote in favor of a similar corruption investigation into Rousseff's successor Michel Temer, and although she voted in favor of tax reforms she opposed the 2017 Brazilian labor reforms.
