= Toninho Wandscheer =

Brazilian politician

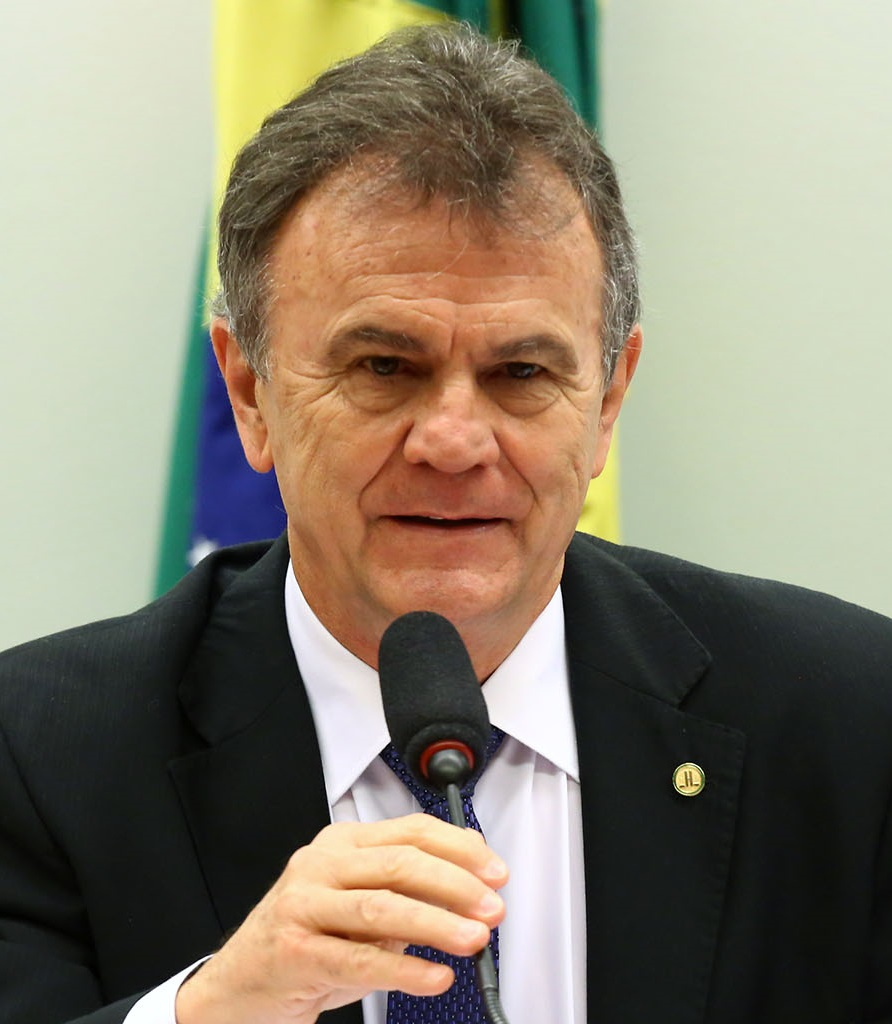
- Wandscheer in December 2017

Federal Deputy for Paraná
- Incumbent
- Assumed office 1 February 2015

State representative for Paraná
- In office 1 February 2011 – 31 January 2015

Mayor of Fazenda Rio Grande
- In office 1 January 2001 – 1 January 2008

Personal details
- Born: 31 August 1950 (age 75) Foz do Iguaçu, Brazil
- Party: PP

Antonio Wandscheer (born 31 August 1950) more commonly known as Toninho or Toninho Wandscheer is a Brazilian politician and engineer. He has spent his political career representing Paraná, having served as state representative since 2015.

== Personal life ==
Wandscheer was born to Paulo Wandscheer and Maria Koupaka. Prior to becoming a politician Wandscheer worked as an engineer. He is married to Angela Wandscheer and has three sons: Alisson, Marcos, and Tiago. Wandscheer is a Protestant Christian and a member of the evangelical caucus in the legislature, having a strong relationship with the Assembleias de Deus church.

== Political career ==
Wandscheer voted in favor of the impeachment motion of then-president Dilma Rousseff. He would later vote against opening a similar corruption investigation against Rousseff's successor Michel Temer, and voted in favor of the 2017 Brazilian labor reforms.

In 2019 Wandscheer was re-elected the coordinator of the representatives from Paraná in the chamber of deputies.
