= Flexa Ribeiro =

Brazilian politician

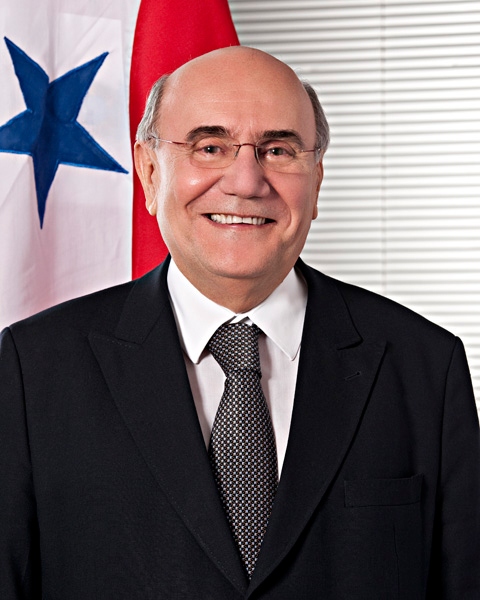

Senator from Pará
- Incumbent
- Assumed office 1 February 2003

Vice-President of PSDB
- Incumbent
- Assumed office 9 December 2017 Serving with Marconi Perillo, Ricardo Tripoli, Paulo Bauer, Shéridan Oliveira, Carlos Sampaio, Aloysio Nunes
- President: Geraldo Alckmin

Personal details
- Born: 12 September 1945 (age 80) Terra Alta, PA, Brazil
- Party: PP
- Profession: Engineer

Fernando de Souza Flexa Ribeiro (born September 12, 1945) is a Brazilian politician. He has represented Pará in the Federal Senate since 2005. He is a member of the Progressistas.
