= Mecias de Jesus =

Brazilian senator

- Official portrait

Senator for Roraima
- Incumbent
- Assumed office 1 February 2019

State Deputy for Roraima
- In office 1 February 1995 – 31 January 2019

Personal details
- Born: 8 February 1962 (age 64) Graça Aranha, Maranhão, Brazil
- Party: PRB (2006–)

Antonio Mecias Pereira de Jesus (born 8 February 1962) more commonly known as Mecias de Jesus is a federal senator of Brazil representing the state of Roraima. He previously served in the state legislature from 1995 to 2019.

== Personal life ==
de Jesus was born in Graça Aranha. Prior to becoming a politician, Marcos Rogério worked as a financial adviser. In his youth he also worked as a shoeshine, farmer, waiter and gardener. His son Johnathan de Jesus is also a politician, being elected to the federal chamber of deputies in 2010. Unlike most PRB politicians who belong to the Universal Church of the Kingdom of God, de Jesus and his family belong to the Nova Vida Baptist church.

== Political career ==
In 2017 de Jesus proposed a bill that would exempt churches from paying water, electricity, and telephone taxes in Roraima. The bill caused some controversy as Brazil is officially a secular state and was eventually not passed.

de Jesus is the president of the PRB party in the state of Roraima.

In the 2018 Brazilian general election de Jesus was elected to the federal senate with 85,366 votes. He was one of six new Evangelical members elected to the federal senate in that election.
