= Manuel Marcos =

Brazilian politician

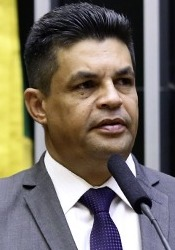
- Marcos in 2019

Member of the Chamber of Deputies
- In office 1 February 2019 – 5 November 2020
- Constituency: Acre

Alderman of Rio Branco
- In office 1 January 2013 – 1 February 2019
- Constituency: At-large

Personal details
- Born: Manuel Marcos Carvalho de Mesquita; 7 May 1972 (age 54) Tianguá, Ceará, Brazil
- Party: Republicanos (since 2007)

Manuel Marcos Carvalho de Mesquita (born 7 May 1972) is a Brazilian politician and pastor. Although born in Ceará, he has spent his political career representing the state of Acre, having served as state representative since 2019.

== Personal life ==
Marcos is a pastor of the neo-Pentecostal Universal Church of the Kingdom of God. Marcos married Regilene Mesquita in 1991 in the city of Manaus, with whom he has two children. He moved to in Acre with his family in August 2005.

== Political career ==
Marcos was elected to the city council of Rio Branco in 2012, and was re-elected in 2016. He has been the leader of the Brazilian Republican Party in the state of Acre since 2008.

In the 2018 Brazilian general election Marcos was elected to the federal chamber of deputies with 7,489 votes.

Marcos is considered a strong supporter of welfare projects, having invested in education and the sewage system while in the city council. Owing to his evangelical beliefs he is considered conservative when it comes to social issues such as family values, same-sex-marriage, and abortion.
