= Tia Eron =

Brazilian politician

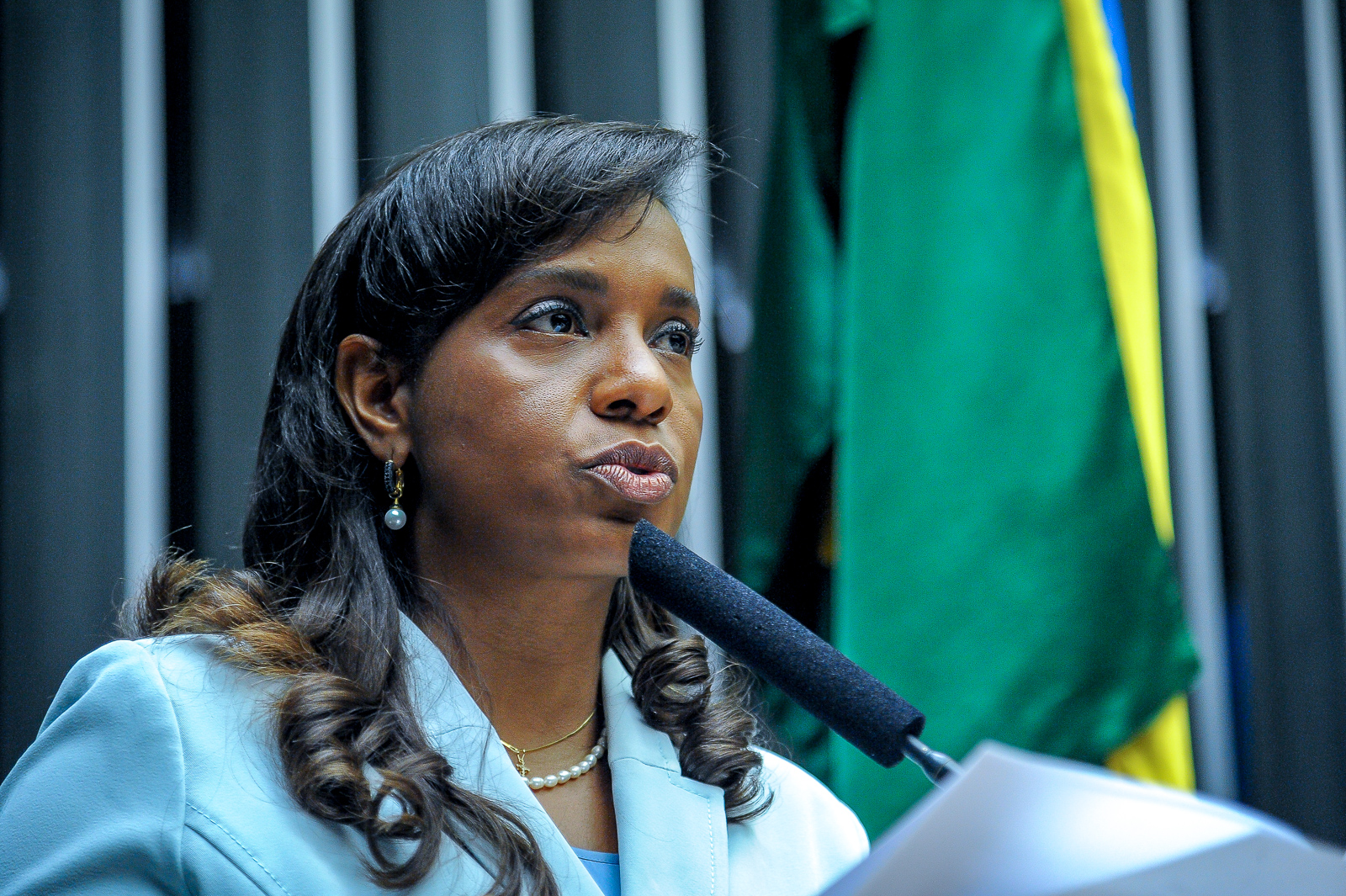
- Tia Eron in May 2016

Secretary of Social Promotion to Combat Poverty of Salvador
- Incumbent
- Assumed office 13 January 2017

Federal Deputy for Bahia
- In office 1 February 2015 – 12 January 2017

Vereador of Salvador
- In office 1 February 2001 – 31 January 2015

Personal details
- Born: 2 June 1972 (age 54) Salvador, Bahia, Brazil
- Party: PRB (2012-); DEM (2007-2012); PFL (2000-2007)

Eronildes Vasconcelos Carvalho (born 2 June 1972) more commonly known as Tia Eron is a Brazilian politician. She has spent her political career representing Bahia, having served as state representative from 2015 to 2017.

== Personal life ==
She is the daughter of José Alexandrino Vasconcelos and Eronilia França Lima. She is a member of the Igreja Universal do Reino de Deus, and while working in elementary schools run by the church is where her nickname "Tia Eron" of "Aunt Eron" originated, given to her by the students.

== Political career ==
Before being elected to the federal chamber of deputies, Tia Eron served as a vereador in her hometown of Salvador for more than a decade, from 2001 to 2015.

In the 2014 election Tia Eron was elected from the state of Bahia with 116,912 being one of the most voted deputies in her state. She is also the first Afro-Brazilian woman elected to the chamber of deputies from Bahia.

Tia Eron voted in favor of the impeachment of then-president Dilma Rousseff. She would provide the decisive vote for a corruption investigation into Eduardo Cunha which would result in his eventual removal from office.

In January 2017 Tia Eron left her position as federal deputy after being appointed secretary of social promotion to combat poverty by mayor of Salvador Antônio Carlos Magalhães Neto.
