= Rodrigo de Castro (politician) =

Brazilian politician (born 1971)

Member of the Chamber of Deputies
- Incumbent
- Assumed office 1 February 2007
- Constituency: Minas Gerais

Personal details
- Born: 15 July 1971 (age 55)
- Party: Brazil Union (since 2022)
- Parent: Danilo de Castro (father)

Rodrigo Batista de Castro (born 15 July 1971) is a Brazilian politician serving as a member of the Chamber of Deputies since 2007. He is the son of Danilo de Castro.
