= Perpétua Almeida =

Brazilian politician

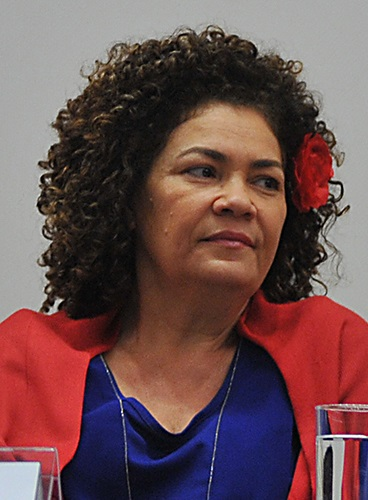
- Almeida in May 2014

Member-elect of the Chamber of Deputies
- Assuming office 1 February 2027
- Constituency: Acre
- In office 1 February 2019 – 1 February 2023
- Constituency: Acre
- In office 1 February 2003 – 31 January 2015
- Constituency: Acre

Councillor of Rio Branco
- In office 1 January 2001 – 1 February 2003
- Constituency: At-large

Personal details
- Born: Maria Perpétua de Almeida; 28 December 1964 (age 61) Cruzeiro do Sul, Acre, Brazil
- Party: PCdoB (since 1987)
- Profession: Teacher, bank clerk, trade unionist
- Website: www.perpetuafederal.com

Maria Perpétua de Almeida (born 28 December 1964), more commonly known as Perpétua Almeida, is a Brazilian politician as well as a banker and teacher. She has spent her political career representing the state of Acre, having served as state representative from 2003 to 2015 and since 2019.

== Personal life ==
Almeida is the daughter of Francisco Batista de Almeida and Maria de Lourdes. She grew up in a poor family of rubber tappers, and she is the youngest of 15 children. Almeida spent five years studying to be a Dominican nun in a convent in Cruzeiro do Sul, but later left the religious life for social activism, later writing on her social media that "I believe we can serve God wherever we are."

She is married to Edvaldo Magalhães, whom she met at a communist party meeting in Rio Branco. Almeida and Magalhães have two children. Prior to becoming a politician, Almeida worked as a banker and as a teacher. Almeida is of Afro-Brazilian descent.

== Political career ==
In the 2002 Brazilian general election, Almeida was the most voted for federal deputy in the state of Acre with 34,730 votes, and her husband was the most voted member of the state legislature. In the 2014 Brazilian general election, Almeida contested the seat in the Federal Senate against Gladson Cameli. Cameli received 58% of the votes and was elected, while Almedia finished in second place with 36% of the votes and, as a consequence, did not hold public office for the next four years. In the 2018 Brazilian general election, Almeida returned to the federal chamber of deputies after being elected with 18,374 votes.

Together with other politicians in Acre, Almeida and her husband have campaigned for access to clean water, and indigenous rights such as the land rights of the Puyanawa tribe.
