= Odair Cunha =

Brazilian politician (born 1976)

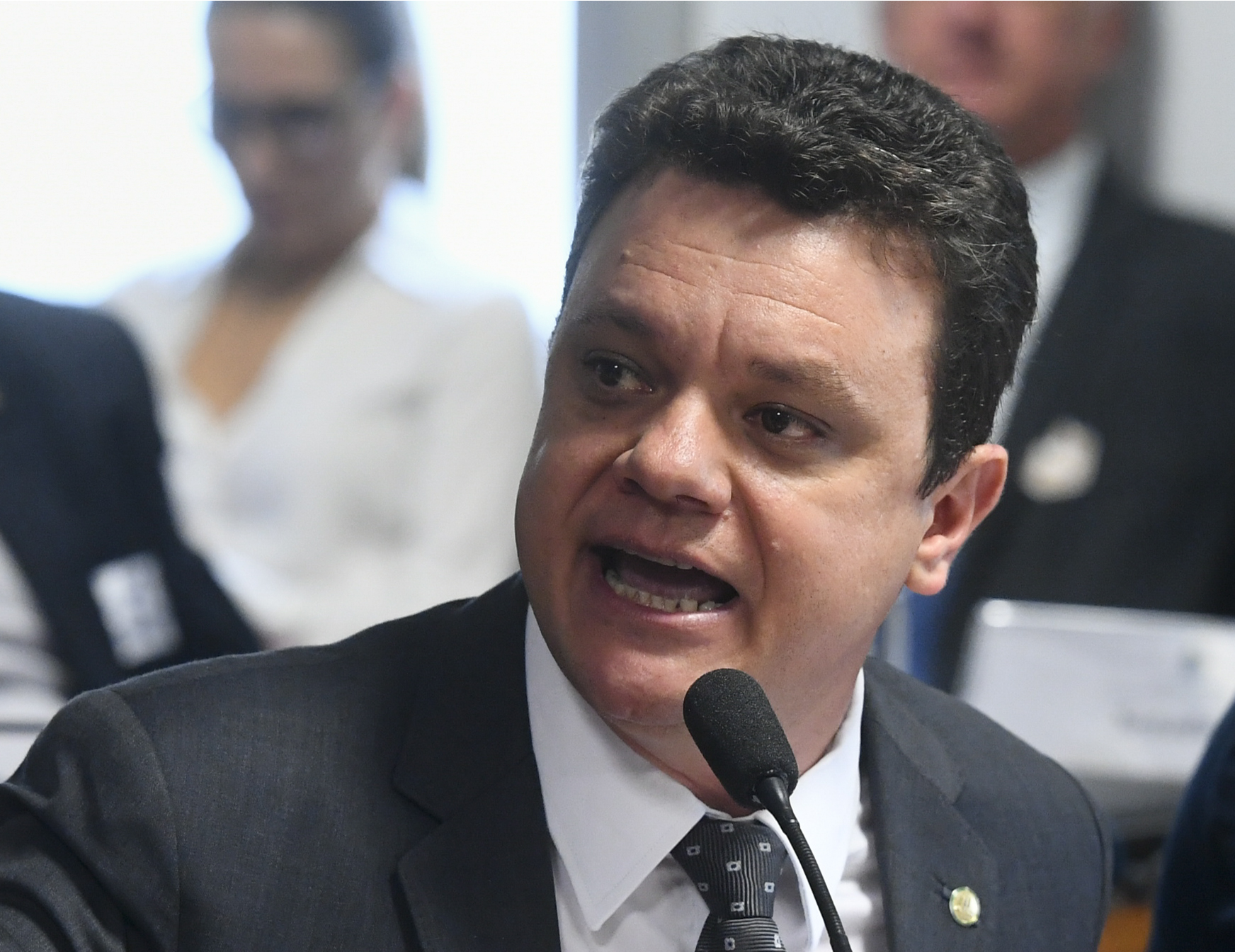
- Cunha in 2020

Member of the Chamber of Deputies
- Incumbent
- Assumed office 1 February 2003
- Constituency: Minas Gerais

Personal details
- Born: 18 June 1976 (age 49)
- Party: Workers' Party (since 1999)

Odair José da Cunha (born 18 June 1976) is a Brazilian politician, serving as a member of the Chamber of Deputies since 2003. From 2024 to 2025, he served as group leader of the Workers' Party.
