= Guaracy Silveira =

Brazilian politician (born 1951)

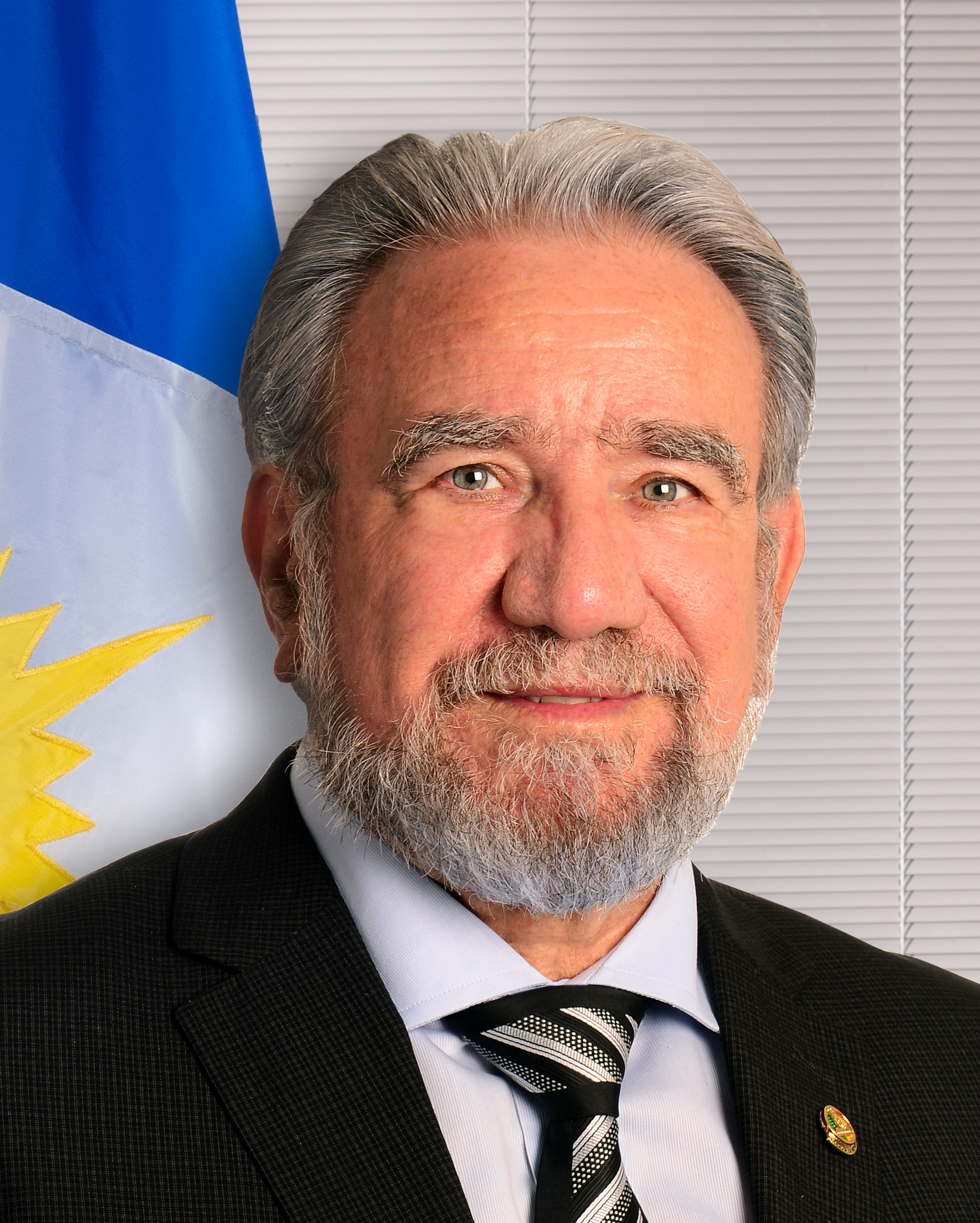
- Silveira in 2017

Senator for Tocantins
- Incumbent
- Assumed office 4 August 2022
- In office 31 October 2018 – 31 January 2019

Personal details
- Born: Guaracy Batista da Silveira; 2 January 1951 (age 75) Capão Bonito, São Paulo, Brazil
- Party: Avante (2022–present
- Other political affiliations: PSD (2009–13); DC (2018); PSL (2018–22)
- Occupation: Religious bishop

Guaracy Batista da Silveira (born 2 January 1951) is a Brazilian politician and pastor. Although born in São Paulo, he has spent his political career representing Tocantins, having served as national senator from 2018 to 2019.

== Personal life ==
Silveria was born in Capão Bonito. He is a bishop in the International Church of the Foursquare Gospel.

== Political career ==
In the 2014 Brazilian general election Silveria was elected as an alternate to Kátia Abreu for the state of Tocantins. During the 2018 Brazilian general election Abreu ran for vice-president for Ciro Gomes' campaign, leaving her post which Silvira served as her replacement in the Brazilian senate. While in the senate Silveria was criticized by media in Brazil for accumulating over R$ 1 million in dept, mostly in overspending of his salary on hotels.
