= João Bacelar =

Brazilian politician (born 1972)

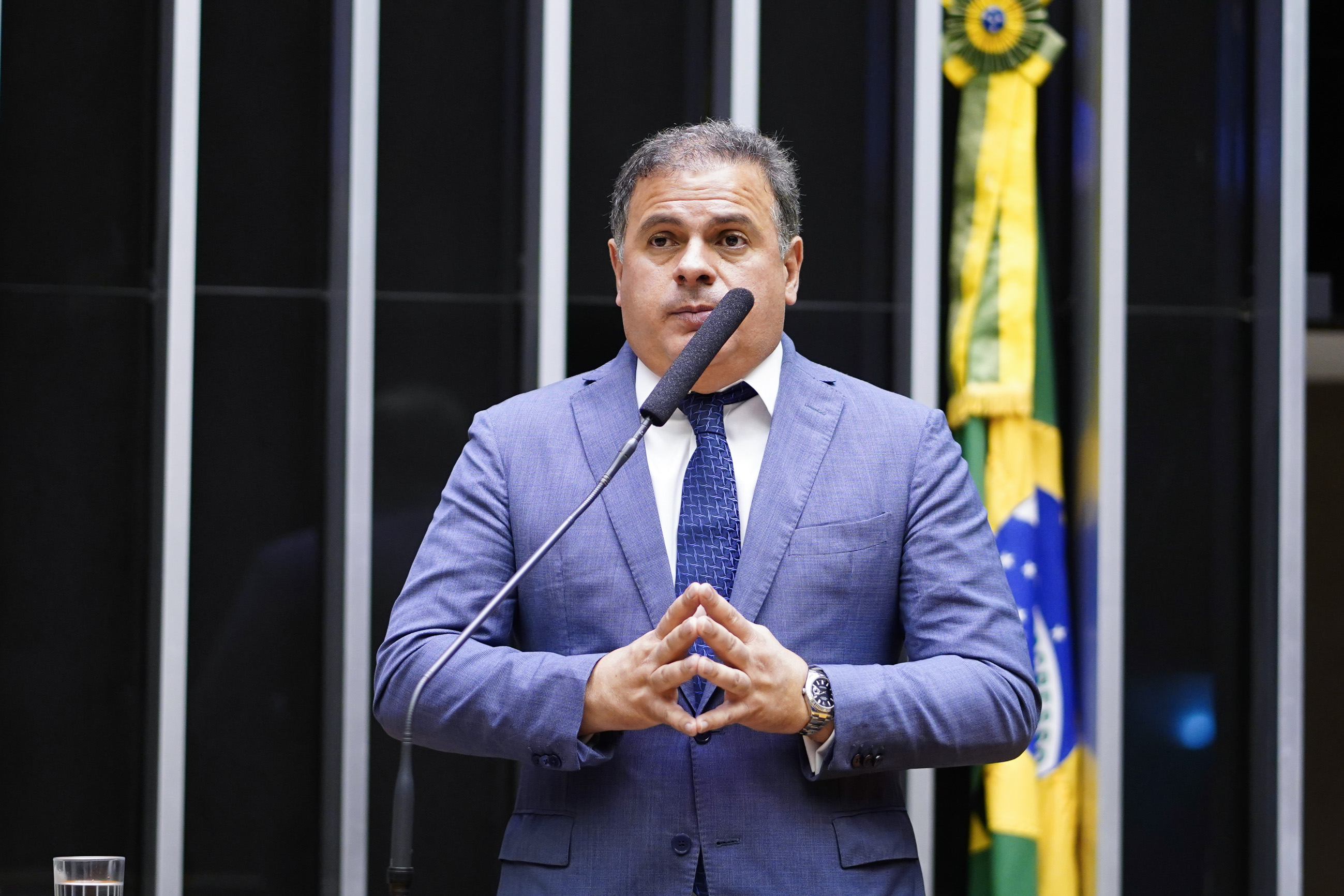
- Bacelar in 2023

Member of the Chamber of Deputies
- Incumbent
- Assumed office 1 February 2007
- Constituency: Bahia

Personal details
- Born: João Carlos Paolilo Bacelar Filho; 8 October 1972 (age 54) Salvador, Bahia, Brazil
- Party: PL (since 2006)
- Other political affiliations: PL (2002–2006)
- Parent: João Carlos Bacelar (father)
- Relatives: Ruy Bacelar (uncle)

João Carlos Paolilo Bacelar Filho (born 8 October 1972) is a Brazilian politician serving as a member of the Chamber of Deputies since 2007. He is the son of João Carlos Bacelar and the nephew of Ruy Bacelar.
