= Gilberto Nascimento =

Brazilian politician (born 1956)

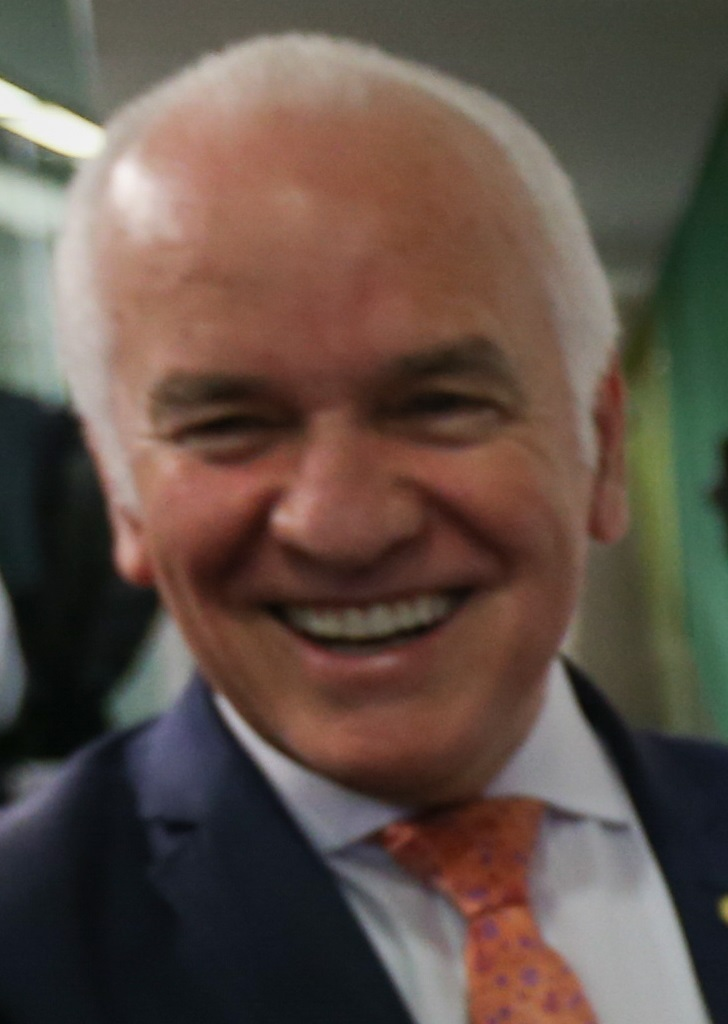
- Nascimento in 2016

Federal Deputy for São Paulo
- Incumbent
- Assumed office 1 February 2015

Federal Deputy for São Paulo
- In office 1 February 2003 – 31 January 2007

State deputy for São Paulo
- In office 15 March 1995 – 31 January 2003

Alderman for São Paulo
- In office 1 February 1983 – 31 December 1994

Personal details
- Born: 9 July 1956 (age 70) São Paulo, Brazil
- Party: PSC

Gilberto Nascimento Silva (born 9 July 1956) is a Brazilian politician and lawyer. He has spent his political career representing São Paulo (state), having served as state representative since 2015.

== Personal life ==
Prior to becoming a politician Nascimento worked as a lawyer. He is a member of the Assembleias de Deus church. Nascimento has been at times been criticized as an apologists of Silas Malafaia.

== Political career ==
Nascimento voted in favor of the impeachment against then-president Dilma Rousseff and political reformation. He would later back Rousseff's successor Michel Temer against a similar impeachment motion, and also voted in favor of the Brazil labor reform (2017).
