= Graça Aranha, Maranhão =

Graça Aranha
- Municipality
- Location in Maranhão state

- Location in Brazil
- Coordinates: 5°24′36″S 44°20′02″W
- Country: Brazil
- Region: Northeast
- State: Maranhão

Area
  - Total: 271 km^{2} (105 sq mi)

Population (2020)
  - Total: 6,261
  - Density: 23.1/km^{2} (59.8/sq mi)
- Time zone: UTC−3 (BRT)

Graça Aranha is a municipality in the state of Maranhão, Brazil, founded in 1959.

- Altitude: 192m.
- Population: 6,261 inhabitants (2020)
- Area: 271 km^{2}
- Demographic density: 16.82 inhabitants/km^{2}
- Postal code: 65785-000
- Microregion: Presidente Dutra
