= Jofran Frejat =

Brazilian politician (1937–2020)

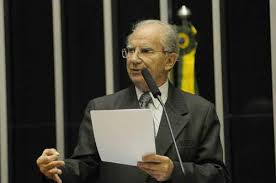
Jofran Frejat

Jofran Frejat (1937 – 23 November 2020) was a Brazilian politician who served as a Deputy.
