= Alice Portugal =

Brazilian politician (born 1959)

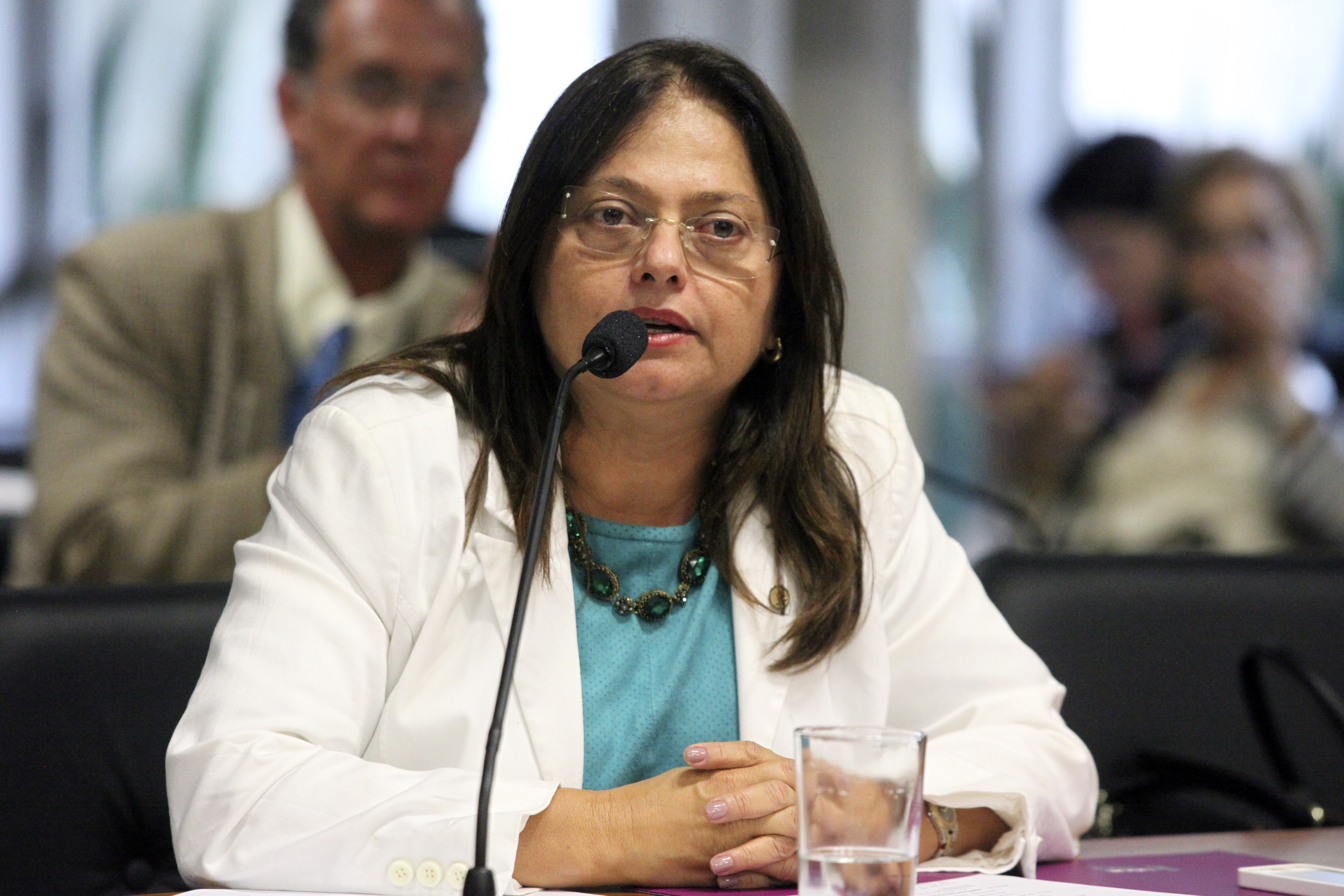

Member of the Chamber of Deputies
- Incumbent
- Assumed office 1 February 2003
- Constituency: Bahia

Member of the Legislative Assembly of Bahia
- In office 1 February 1995 – 1 February 2003
- Constituency: At-large

Personal details
- Born: Alice Mazzuco Portugal; 16 May 1959 (age 67) Salvador, Bahia, Brazil
- Party: PCdoB (since 1978)
- Education: Federal University of Bahia (PharmB)
- Profession: Biochemical pharmacist

Alice Mazzuco Portugal (born 16 May 1959) is a Brazilian biochemical pharmacist and politician.

Born in Salvador, she was active in the student movement and technical workers' unions at the Federal University of Bahia, where she graduated in pharmacy-biochemistry in 1981. Portugal is affiliated to the Communist Party of Brazil since 1979; she was elected state representative of Bahia from 1995 to 2003, when she was elected to the federal Chamber of Deputies, having been reelected in 2006, 2010 and 2014.

== Political career ==
In April 2017 she voted against the labor reform. In August of the same year, she voted for a corruption investigation of the then President Michel Temer.
