= Evandro Garla =

Brazilian politician (born 1978)

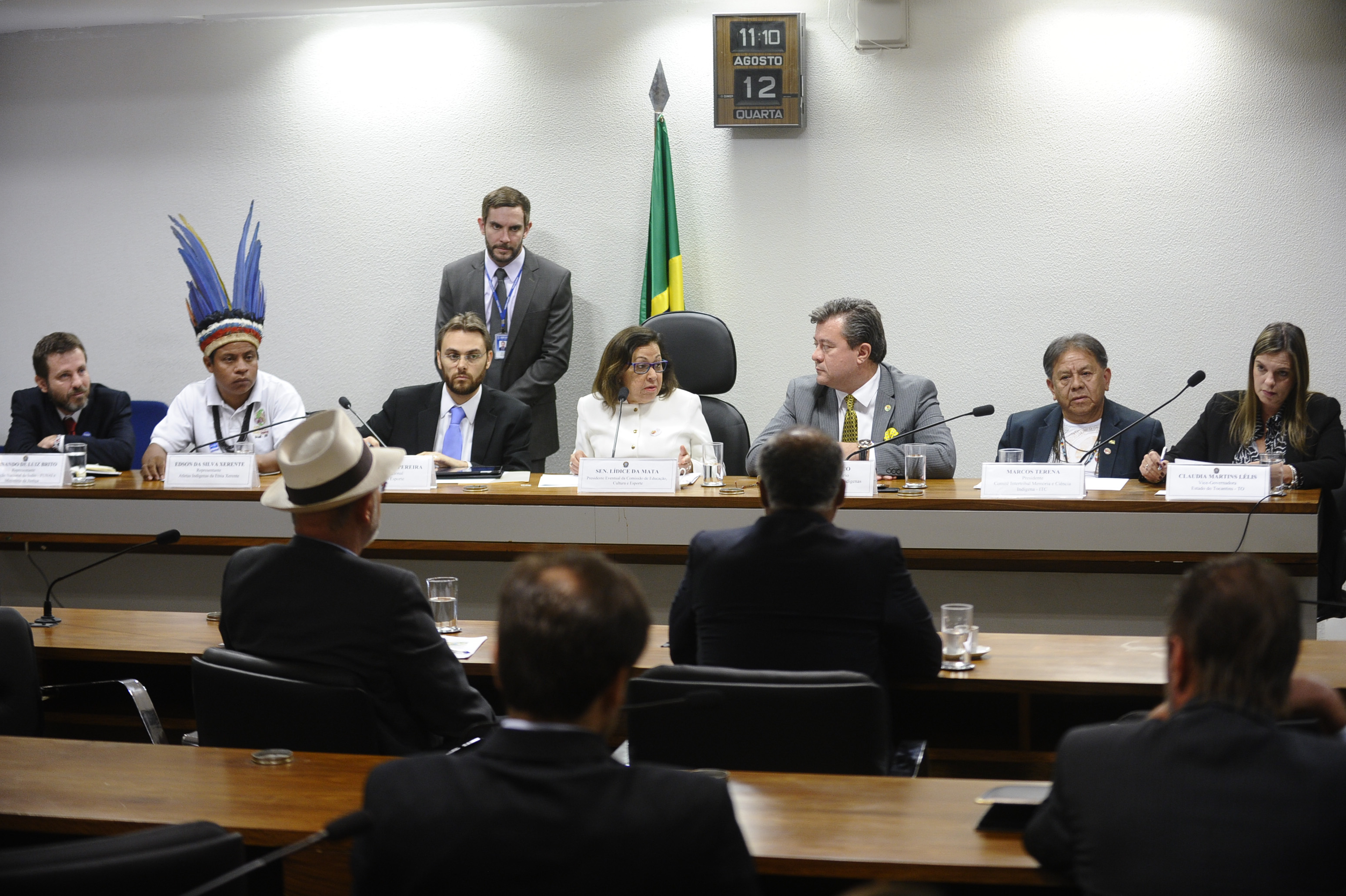
- Garla in 2015

Secretary of Justice and Human Rights of Pará
- Incumbent
- Assumed office 1 February 2023
- Governor: Helder Barbalho
- Preceded by: Valbetanio Barbosa Milhomem

Personal details
- Born: 9 May 1978 (age 48)
- Party: Republicans (since 2007)

Evandro Garla Pereira da Silva (born 9 May 1978) is a Brazilian politician serving as secretary of justice of Pará since 2023. From 2009 to 2023, he served as secretary general of the Republicans. From 2011 to 2014, he was a member of the Legislative Chamber of the Federal District. From 2015 to 2016, he served as national secretary of sports, leisure and social inclusion.
