= Luiz Couto =

Brazilian politician (born 1945)

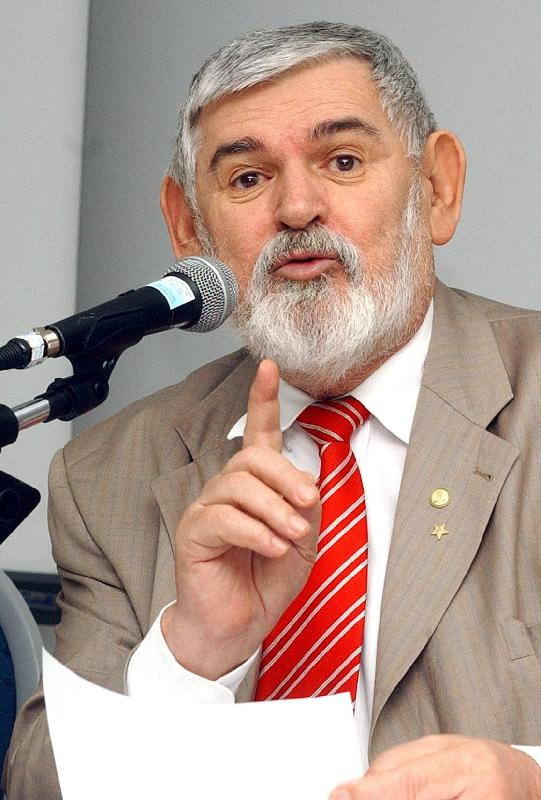
- Couto in October 2012

Federal Deputy for the Paraíba
- In office 1 February 2003 – 31 January 2019

State representative for Paraíba
- In office 1 February 1995 – 31 January 2003

Personal details
- Born: 13 February 1945 (age 81) Soledade, Paraíba, Brazil
- Party: PT

Luiz Albuquerque Couto (born 13 February 1945) is a Brazilian politician as well as a university professor and Catholic priest. He has spent his political career representing his home state of Paraíba, having served as state representative from 2003 to 2019.

== Personal life ==
Couto was born to Antônio Joaquim de Couto and Elisa Leopoldina de Albuquerque. His parents were landless farmers and Couto grew up in a poor environment. He is an alumnus of the Federal University of Paraíba. Couto attended seminary from 1974 to 1978, and on 19 December 1978 Couto was ordained to the Catholic priesthood. Couto has also worked as a professor, teaching theology, anthropology, and philosophy at various universities in Paraíba. On 22 December 2018 Couto celebrated mass commemorating 40 years of him being a priest. Couto is a proponent of Liberation theology.

Despite the Catholic church's teachings regarding homosexuality, Couto has spoken against the discrimination of LGBTQ individuals in Brazil and has also encouraged the use of condoms as a way to prevent HIV/AIDs. Because of his defense of the usage of condoms, Couto was suspended from the duties of the priesthood in 2009.

== Political career ==
Couto voted against the impeachment motion of then-president Dilma Rousseff. Couto voted against the 2017 Brazilian labor reform, and he would vote in favor of a corruption investigation into Rousseff's successor Michel Temer.

Couto was investigated in December 2018 for alleged irregularities in campaign finance during the 2018 Brazilian general election.
