= Evandro (footballer, born 1985) =

Brazilian footballer

Personal information
- Full name: Evandro Russo Ramos
- Date of birth: 22 July 1985 (age 41)
- Place of birth: Campinas, Brazil
- Height: 1.69 m (5 ft 7 in)
- Position: Forward

Senior career*
Years	Team	Apps	(Gls)
- Castelletto
- Seefeld Zürich
2005–2006	APEP	22	(2)
2006	Ayia Napa	11	(1)
2007	Al-Nejmeh		
2008–2009	Mogi Mirim	1	(0)
2009	→ Red Bull Brasil (loan)	0	(0)
2009	Linense	0	(0)
2009–2010	Poços de Caldas	0	(0)
2010	Uberaba	7	(0)
2011	Tupi	8	(0)
2012	Brasiliense	1	(0)
2015	Rio Branco	9	(4)
- * Club domestic league appearances and goals

Evandro Russo Ramos (born 22 July 1985), known as just Evandro, is a Brazilian footballer.

His given name is also misspelt as Ivandro.

== Biography ==
Evandro started his career at Italy, then played for Swiss side Seefeld Zürich and Cyprus.

Evandro joined Al-Nejmeh on 6 February 2007. In December 2007 he signed a 1 1/2-year contract with Mogi Mirim of Campeonato Paulista Série A2, which he left for another São Paulo side Red Bull Brasil in June 2008. After playing for Mogi Mirim at the 2009 Campeonato Paulista, in March 2009 he signed a contract until the end of Campeonato Paulista Série A2 with Linense. In August 2009, he left for Poços de Caldas for the 2009 Taça Minas Gerais and 2010 Campeonato Mineiro Módulo II.

In July 2010 he was signed by Uberaba. He played 7 games at 2010 Campeonato Brasileiro Série D.

In December 2010 he was signed by Tupi after passed the trail.
