= Liziane Bayer =

Brazilian politician

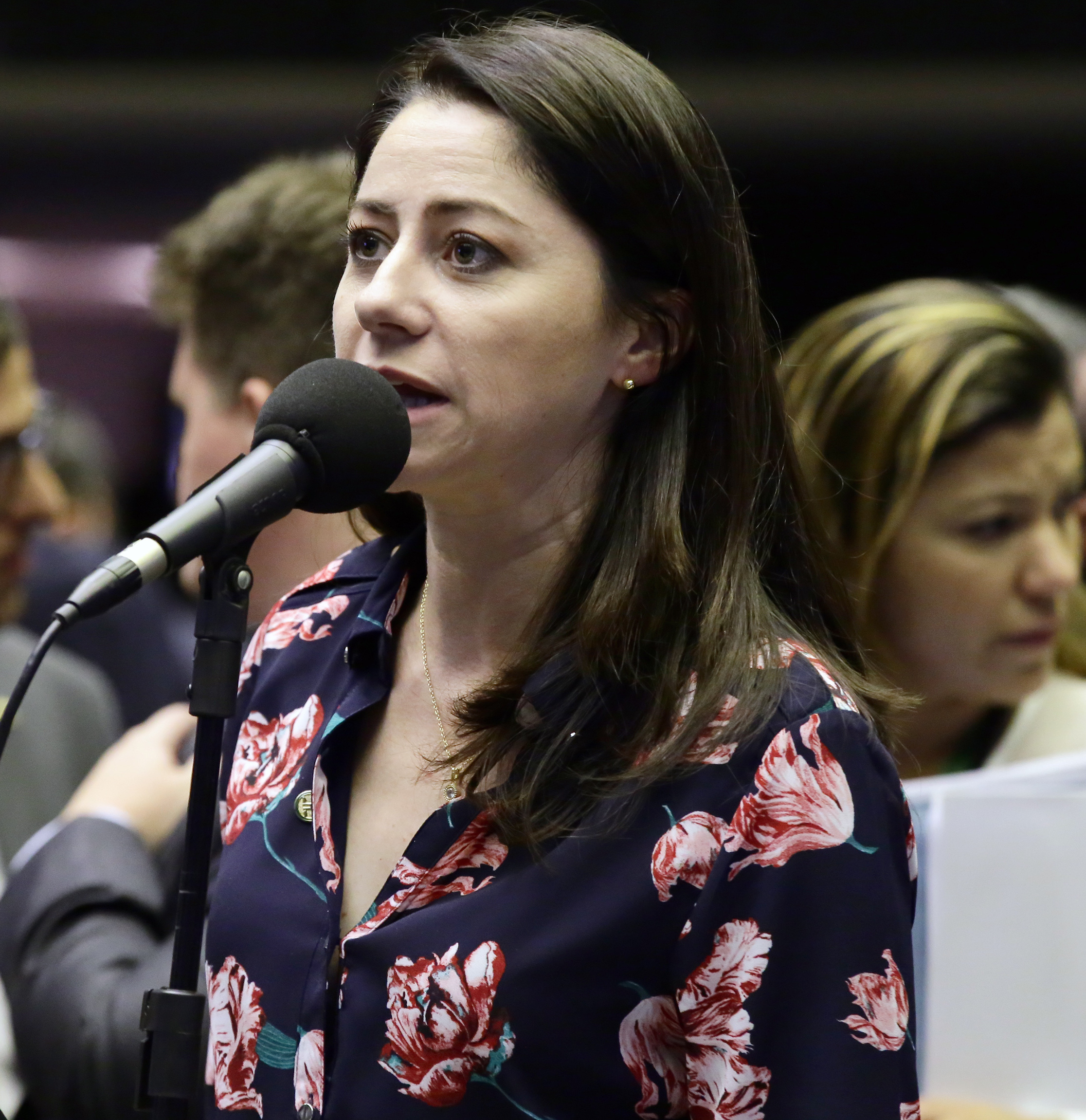
- Bayer in March 2019

Federal Deputy for Rio Grande do Sul
- Incumbent
- Assumed office 1 February 2019

State Deputy for Rio Grande do Sul
- In office 1 February 2015 – 31 January 2019

Personal details
- Born: 24 January 1981 (age 45) Porto Alegre, Rio Grande do Sul, Brazil
- Party: PSB
- Relatives: Franciane Bayer (sister)

Liziane Bayer da Costa (born 24 January 1981) is a Brazilian politician and pastor. She has spent her political career representing her home state of Rio Grande do Sul, having served as state representative since 2019.

== Personal life ==
Bayer is a pastor of the Pentecostal church Igreja Internacional da Graça de Deus.

== Political career ==
Bayer was elected to the Legislative Assembly of Rio Grande do Sul in 2015. In the 2018 Brazilian general election Bayer was elected to the federal chamber of deputies from her state.
