= Evandro (footballer, born May 1986) =

Brazilian footballer

Personal information
- Full name: Evandro Silva Resende
- Date of birth: May 10, 1986 (age 40)
- Place of birth: Brazil
- Height: 1.79 m (5 ft 10 in)
- Position: Striker

Team information
- Current team: Americano Futebol Clube

Senior career*
| Years | Team | Apps | (Gls) |
| 2007–2008 | Saipa | | |
| 2008–2010 | Rio Branco Atlético Clube | | |
| 2010–2011 | Americano Futebol Clube | | |
| 2011–2012 | Vitória-ES | | |
| 2012–2013 | Desportiva Ferroviária | | |
| 2013–2014 | Francana | | |
- * Club domestic league appearances and goals as of 3 August 2015

Evandro Silva Resende (or simply Evandro, born May 10, 1986, in Brazil) is a Brazilian football who plays as a striker for Francana.

== Club career ==
He joined Saipa in 2007. In 2008, he returned to Brazil and signed for Rio Branco Atlético Clube. He later played for Americano Futebol Clube.
