= Rebecca Garcia (computer programmer) =

American computer programmer

Rebecca Garcia is an American computer programmer from New York City, who co-founded CoderDojo NYC, a network of programming clubs for young people in Long Island, New York.

== Career ==
Garcia worked as a developer at Do Something, a US-based non-profit youth organization for social change. She was later the chief technical officer of Greatist, a health fitness and wellness media startup, where she was an advocate for Girls Who Code and Iridescent. Garcia currently works as the program manager for Microsoft's Tech Jobs Academy, where she works to help underrepresented New Yorkers get into the information technology field.

== Honors and awards ==
In 2013, Garcia received a White House Champion of Change award for Tech Inclusion. in 2016, she was named as Hispanicize's STEM Star.
