= Humberto Souto =

Brazilian politician (1934–2025)

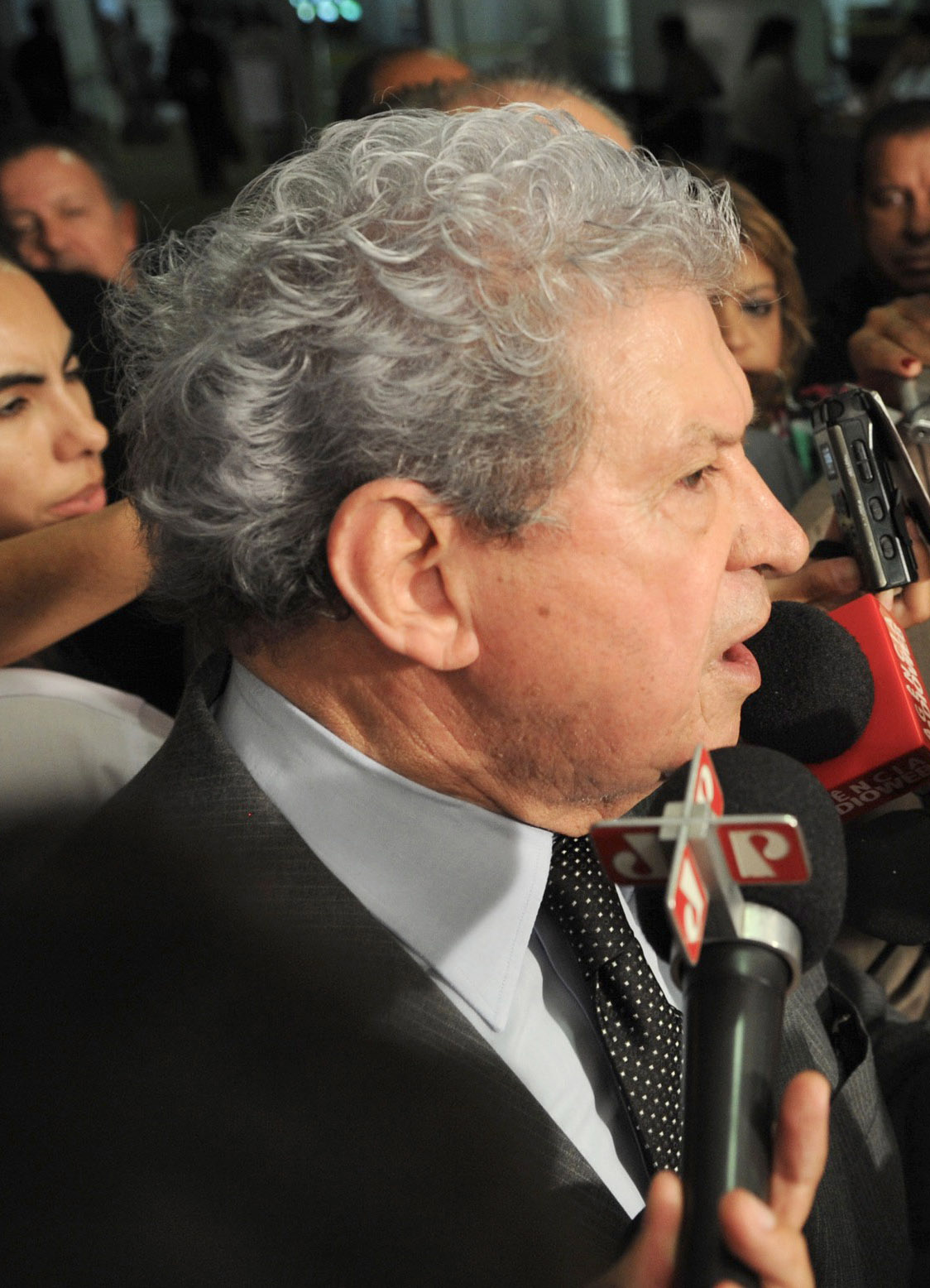
- Souto in 2010

President of the Tribunal de Contas da União
- In office 1 January 2001 – 31 December 2002
- Preceded by: Iram Saraiva
- Succeeded by: Valmir Campelo

Member of the Chamber of Deputies of Brazil for Minas Gerais
- In office 19 December 2012 – 1 February 2015
- In office 1 February 2007 – 31 January 2011
- In office 1 February 1975 – 31 January 1995

Personal details
- Born: Humberto Guimarães Souto; 3 June 1934; Montes Claros, Minas Gerais, Brazil
- Died: 4 February 2025 (aged 90); Brasília, Brazil
- Political party: ARENA (1966–1979); PDS (1980–1985); PFL (1985–1995); PPS/Cidadania (1995–2025)
- Occupation: Lawyer

Humberto Guimarães Souto (3 June 1934 – 4 February 2025) was a Brazilian politician. A member of multiple political parties, he served three terms in the Chamber of Deputies and was president of the Tribunal de Contas da União from 2001 to 2002.

Souto died in Brasília on 4 February 2025, at the age of 90.
