= Evandro (footballer, born 1993) =

Brazilian footballer

Personal information
- Full name: Evandro Rodrigues Florêncio
- Date of birth: 13 January 1993 (age 33)
- Place of birth: São Paulo, Brazil
- Height: 1.78 m (5 ft 10 in)
- Position: Midfielder

Team information
- Current team: Paraná (on loan from Concórdia)

Youth career
- Juventude
- Portuguesa
- Grêmio Prudente
- Grêmio Mauaense

Senior career*
Years	Team	Apps	(Gls)
2016	Toledo	13	(0)
2016–2017	Guarani	61	(2)
2018	Bragantino	9	(0)
2019	Botafogo SP	9	(0)
2019	Luverdense	13	(0)
2020–2021	São Bento	27	(0)
2021	Barra-SC	18	(0)
2021	Brusque	7	(0)
2022–	Concórdia	9	(0)
2022-	→ Paraná (loan)	0	(0)
- * Club domestic league appearances and goals as of 17:44, 11 May 2022 (UTC)

Evandro Rodrigues Florêncio (born 13 January 1993), simply known as Evandro, is a Brazilian footballer who plays as a midfielder for Paraná, on loan from Concórdia.

== Club career ==
Born in São Paulo, Evandro represented Juventude, Portuguesa, Grêmio Prudente and Mauaense as a youth. He started his senior professional career in 2016 with Toledo. An undisputed starter, he contributed with 13 matches in the Campeonato Paranaense with his side being eliminated in the semifinals.

On 21 April 2016, Evandro signed with third-tier club Guarani. On 16 June 2017, he scored his first goal for the club in a 3–2 defeat against Criciúma. With his contract expiring at the end of 2017, on 6 December he announced that he would leave the club at the end of the season.

On 12 December 2017, Evandro signed with Bragantino for the 2018 Campeonato Paulista. In mid December 2018, he then joined Botafogo-SP for the 2019 Campeonato Paulista. The club announced in April 2019, that he had left the club after not getting his contract extended. Evandro played 9 games for the club.

In June 2019, Evandro joined Luverdense. He then moved to São Bento in January 2020.

== Personal life ==
Evandro is a cousin of Tchê Tchê who is also a footballer. They used to live in the same neighbourhood of São Paulo.
