= Carlos Sampaio =

Brazilian politician (born 1963)

- Sampaio in 2015

Member of the Chamber of Deputies
- Incumbent
- Assumed office 1 February 2003
- Constituency: São Paulo

Member of the Legislative Assembly of São Paulo
- In office 15 March 1999 – 1 February 2003
- Constituency: At-large

Personal details
- Born: Carlos Henrique Focesi Sampaio; 31 March 1963 (age 63) Campinas, São Paulo, Brazil
- Party: PSD (since 2024)
- Other political affiliations: PSDB (1992–2024)

Carlos Henrique Focesi Sampaio (born 31 March 1963) is a Brazilian politician serving as a member of the Chamber of Deputies since 2003. From 1999 to 2002, he was a member of the Legislative Assembly of São Paulo.
