= Silas Câmara =

Brazilian politician

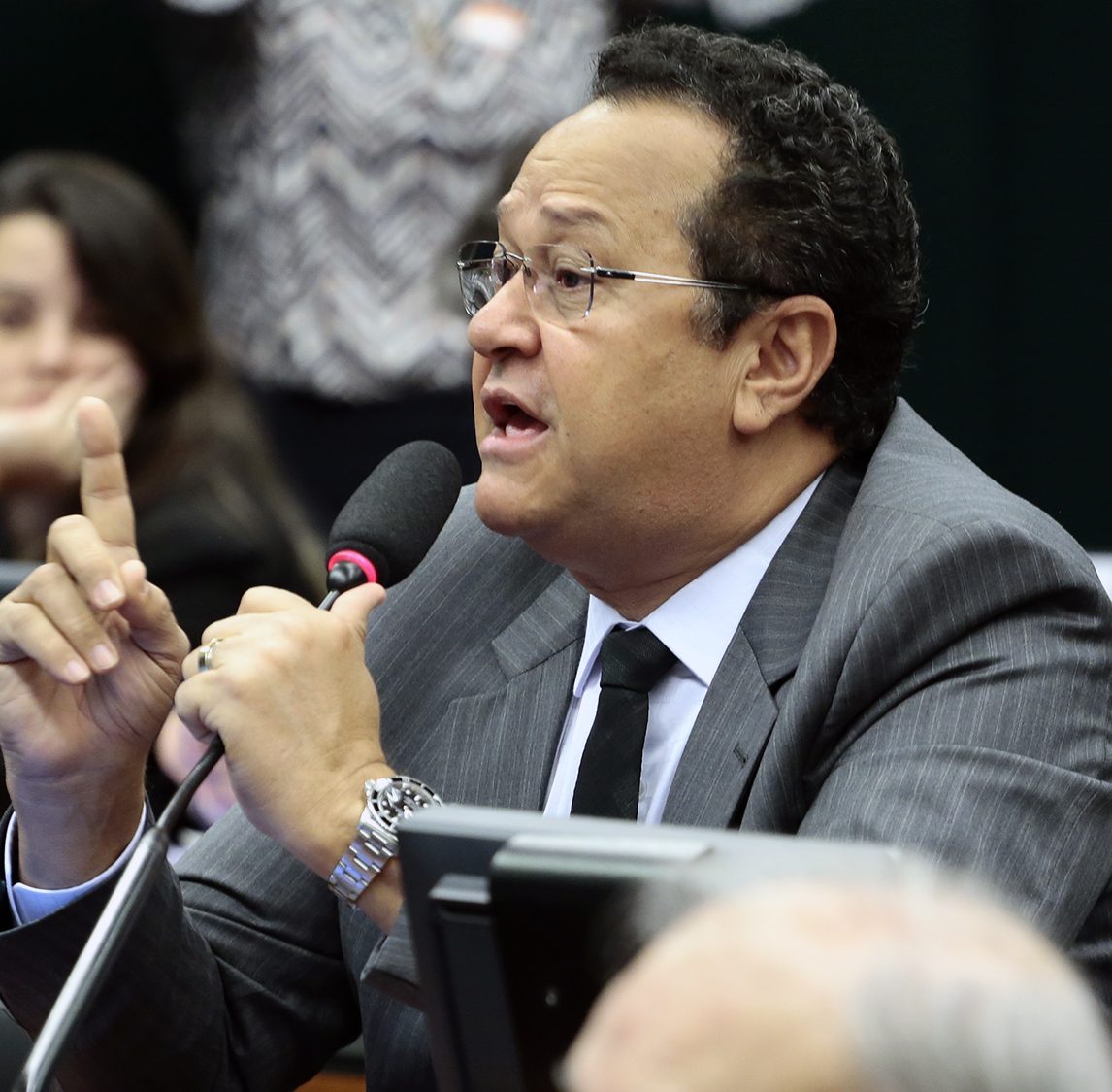
- Câmara in 2017

Member of the Chamber of Deputies
- Incumbent
- Assumed office 1 February 1999
- Constituency: Amazonas

Personal details
- Born: 15 December 1962 (age 63) Rio Branco, Acre, Brazil
- Party: Republicanos (since 2016)
- Other political affiliations: PMDB (1989–1997); PL (1997–1999); PFL (1999); PTB (1999–2007); PAN (2007); PSC (2007–2011); PSD (2011–2016)
- Spouse: Antônia Lúcia
- Occupation: Businessman and evangelical pastor

Silas Câmara (born 15 December 1962), is a Brazilian politician and pastor. Although born in Acre, he has spent his political career representing Amazonas, having served as state representative since 1999 for various political parties.

== Personal life ==
Câmara is a pastor and elder in the Assembleias de Deus church. Câmara has his own radio show and is married to Antônia Lúcia, an economist and Pentecostal missionary. His wife often appears with him on his radio show and at his political event.

== Political career ==
Câmara voted in favor of the impeachment against then-president Dilma Rousseff and political reformation. Câmara would later back Rousseff's successor Michel Temer against a similar impeachment motion.
