= Rebecca Garcia (politician) =

Brazilian economist

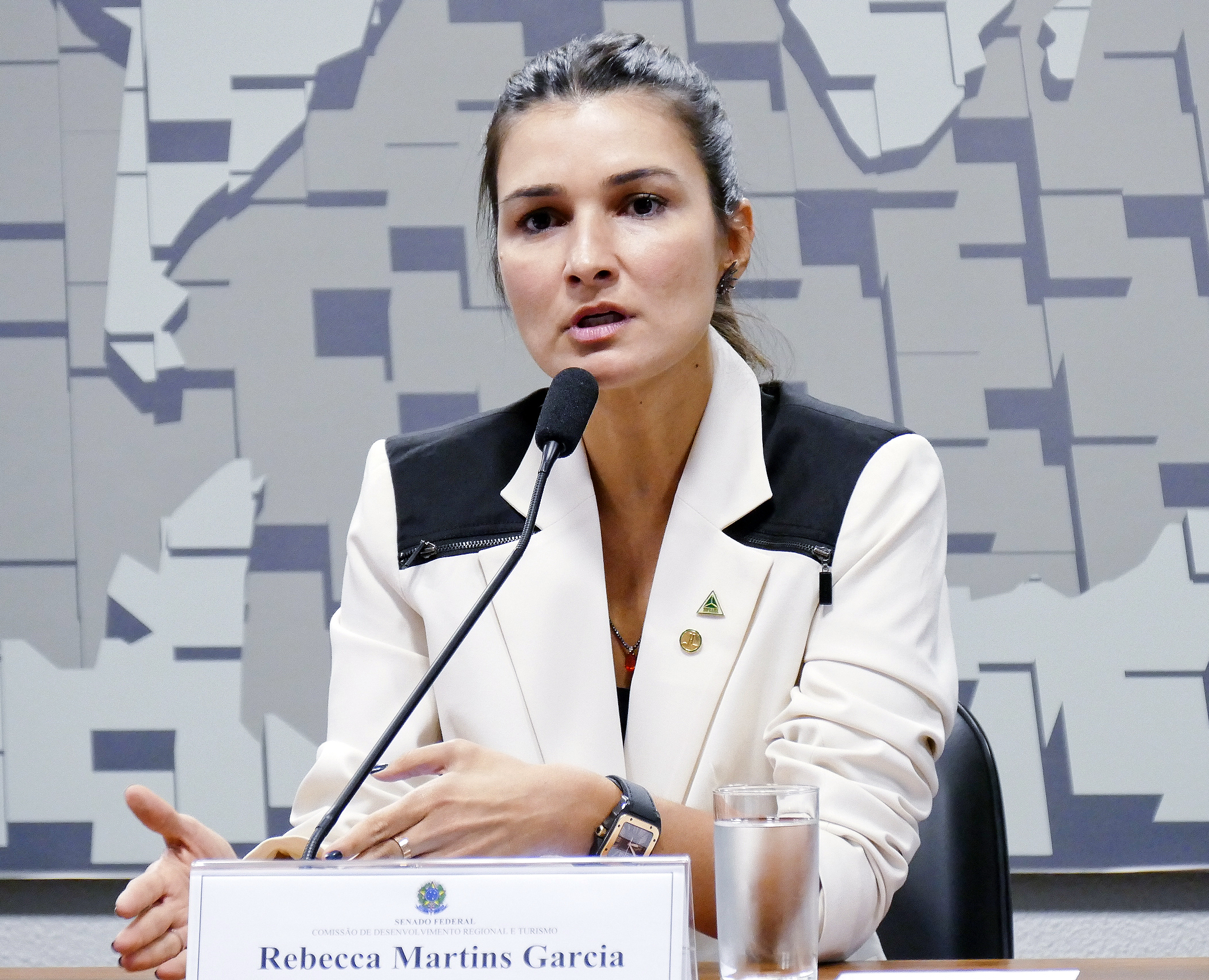
Garcia in 2016

Rebecca or Rebeca Martins Garcia (born 1973) is a Brazilian economist and politician. She represented Amazonas for the Progressistas party in the 53rd Chamber of Deputies of Brazil (2007-2011) and the 54th Chamber of Deputies of Brazil (2011-2014).

She studied economics at Boston University from 1993 to 1996.
