= Cléber Verde =

Brazilian politician (born 1972)

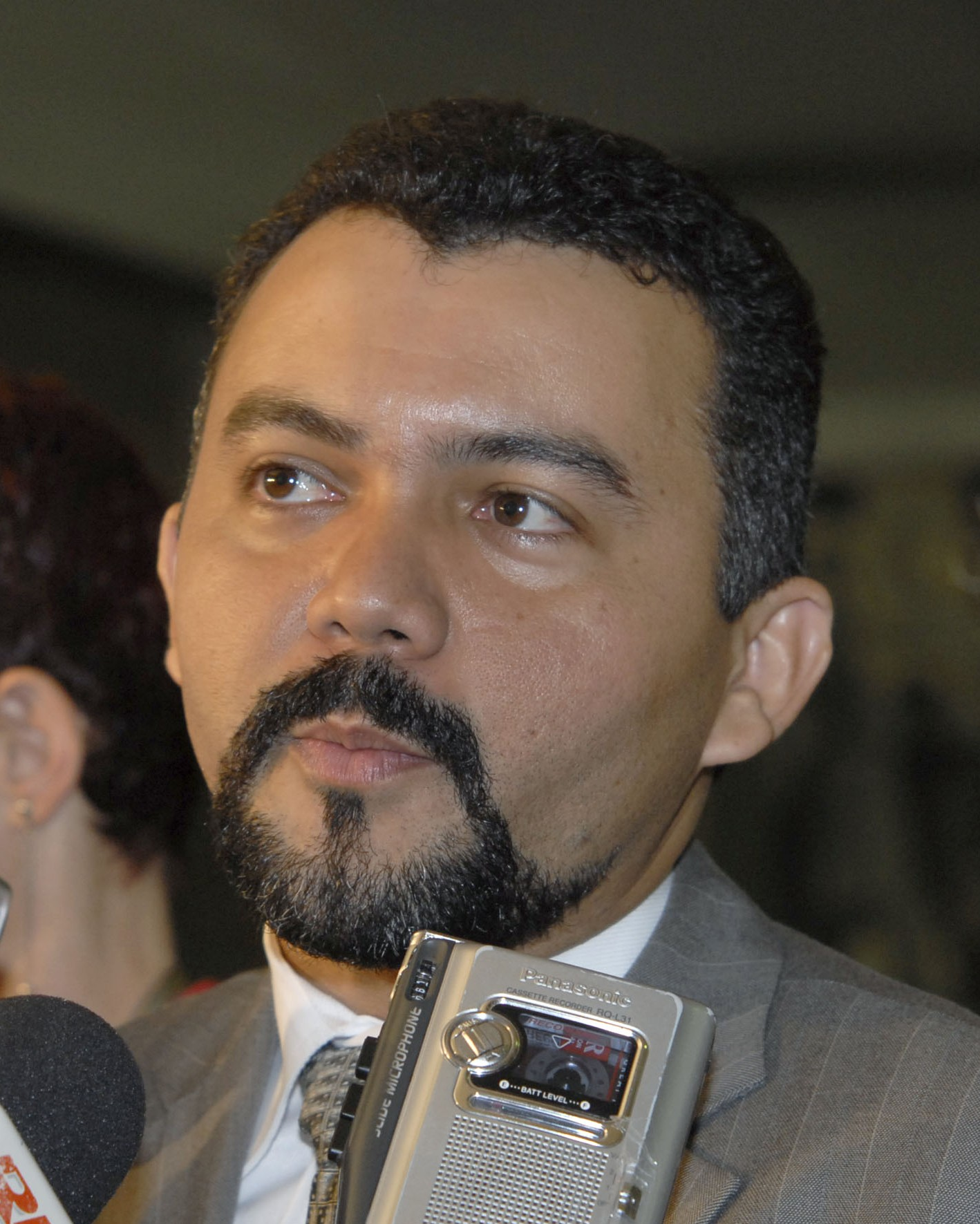
- Verde in 2007

Member of the Chamber of Deputies
- Incumbent
- Assumed office 1 February 2007
- Constituency: Maranhão

City Councillor of Maranhão
- In office 1 January 2001 – 1 February 2007
- Constituency: At-large

Personal details
- Born: Cléber Verde Cordeiro Mendes; 10 May 1972 (age 54) Santa Luzia, Maranhão, Brazil
- Party: MDB (since 2023)
- Other political affiliations: PT (1989–1995); PV (1995–1997); PST (1997–1998); PAN (1998–2007); PTB (2007); Republicanos (2007–2023)
- Profession: Lawyer, writer, teacher

Cléber Verde Cordeiro Mendes (born 10 May 1972), more commonly known as Cléber Verde, is a Brazilian politician. He has spent his political career representing Maranhão, having served as state representative since 2007.

== Personal life ==
Verde is the son of Jesuino Cordeiro Mendes and Maria da Graça Cordeiro Mendes. Aside from being a politician Verde has worked as a college professor, lawyer, writer, and civil servant. Verde is a member of the Assembleias de Deus, one of the few members of the church in the IURD dominated republican party.

== Political career ==
After having represented mostly left-wing parties throughout his political career, Verde joined the religious right-wing Brazilian Republican Party in 2007.

Verde voted in favor of the impeachment of then-president Dilma Rousseff. Verde voted in favor of the 2017 Brazilian labor reform, and would vote against a corruption investigation into Rousseff's successor Michel Temer.
