= Walter Pinheiro =

Brazilian politician

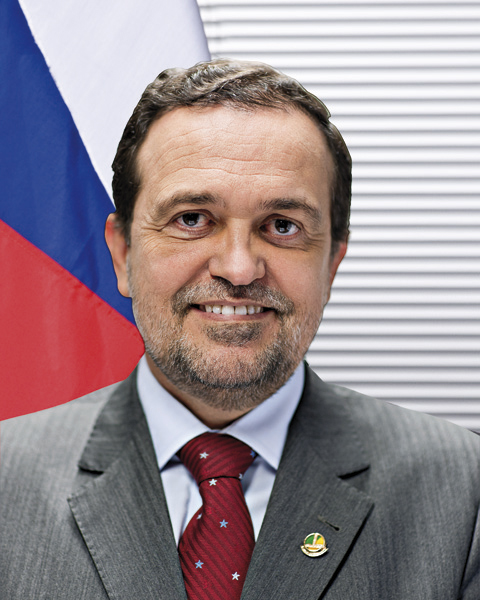

Senator from Bahia
- In office February 1, 2011 – June 7, 2016

Deputy from Bahia
- In office February 1, 1997 – February 1, 2011

Personal details
- Born: May 25, 1959 (age 66) Salvador, Bahia
- Party: Workers' Party

Walter Pinheiro (born May 25, 1959) is a Brazilian politician. He represented Bahia in the Federal Senate from 2011 to 2016. Previously, he was a deputy from Bahia from 1997 to 2011. He is a member of the Workers' Party.

== Personal life ==
Pinheiro is a practicing Baptist, yet despite his religion he stated that faith was a personal matter for him and he did not allow his beliefs to influence politics and vice versa.
