= Zequinha Marinho =

Brazilian politician

- Official portrait

Senator for Pará
- Incumbent
- Assumed office 1 February 2019
- Preceded by: Flexa Ribeiro

Vice Governor of Pará
- In office 1 January 2015 – 31 December 2018
- Governor: Simão Jatene
- Preceded by: Helenilson Pontes
- Succeeded by: Lúcio Vale

Federal Deputy from Pará
- In office 1 January 2003 – 1 January 2015

State Deputy of Pará
- In office 1 January 1997 – 1 January 2003

Personal details
- Born: José da Cruz Marinho; September 18, 1959 (age 67) Araguacema, Tocantins, Brazil
- Party: PODE (2023–present)
- Other political affiliations: PDT (1992–2003); PTB (2003); PSC (2003–05; 2006; 2009–21); PMDB (2005; 2006–09); PL (2022–2023)
- Spouse: Júlia Marinho
- Profession: Pedagogist, Accounting technician, Pastor

José da Cruz Marinho (born 18 September 1959) more commonly known as Zequinha Marinho is a Brazilian politician, as well as a pedagogist, accounting technician, and pastor. Although born in Tocantins, he has spent his political career representing Pará, having served as federal deputy from 2003 to 2015 and senator of republic since 2019.

== Personal life ==
Marinho graduated from Universidade do Estado do Pará and has worked is a pedagogist and an accounting technician prior to entering politics. He is married to Júlia Marinho, who herself is a politician. Marinho is a pastor of the Assembleias de Deus church.

== Political career ==
Marinho voted in favor of the impeachment against then-president Dilma Rousseff. He voted in favor of the Brazil labor reform (2017), and would later back Rousseff's successor Michel Temer against a similar impeachment motion.

In the 2018 election, Marinho was one of 6 new evangelical politicians elected to the federal senate.
