= 2024 Curitiba mayoral election =

2024 Curitiba municipal election
- 6 October 2024 (first round); 27 October 2024 (second round)
- Mayoral election
- Opinion polls
- Turnout: 72.26% (first round); 69.63% (second round)
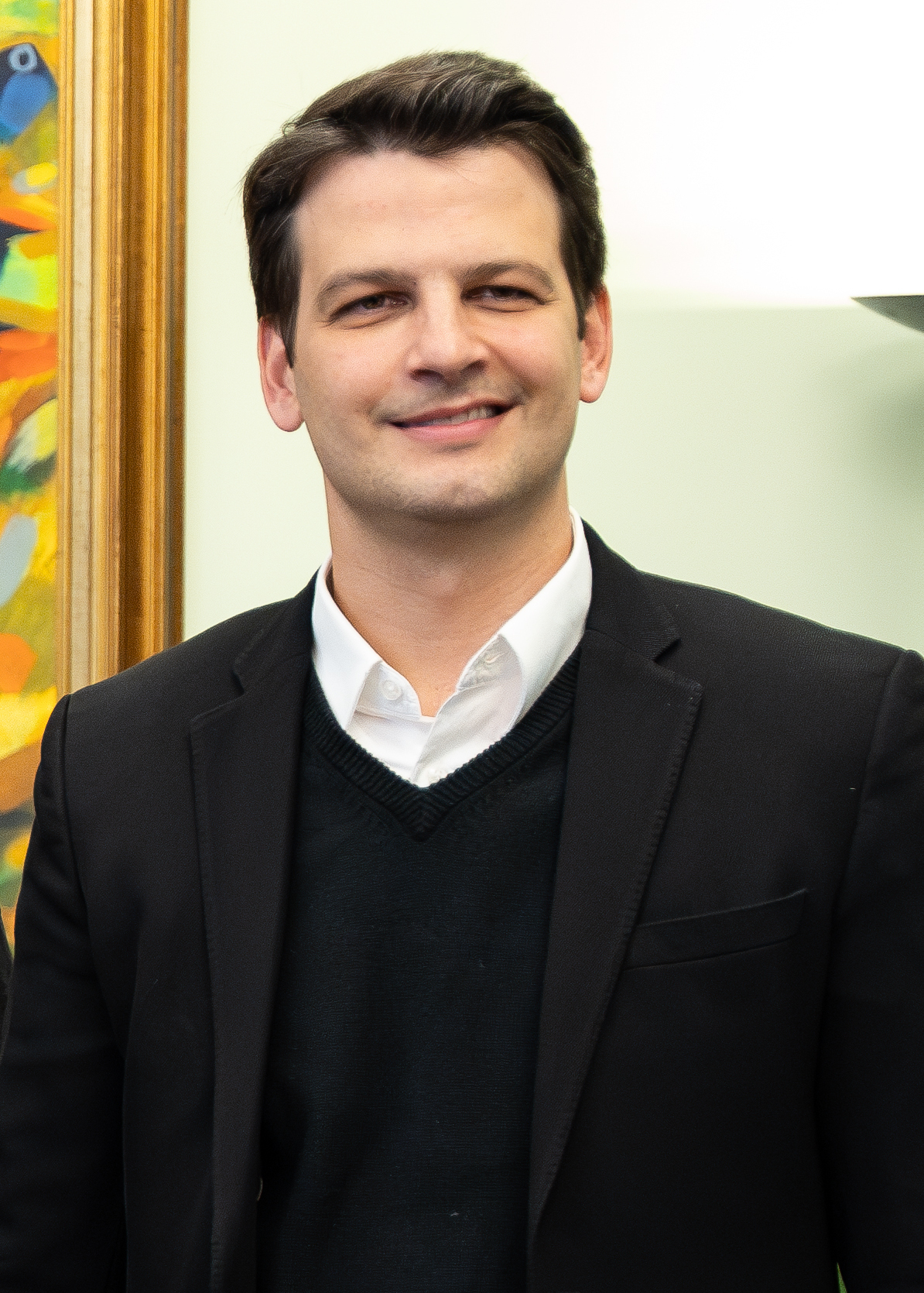

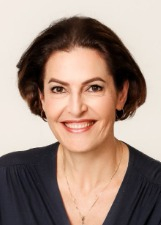
Candidate	Eduardo Pimentel	Cristina Graeml
Party	PSD	DEMOCRATA
Running mate	Paulo Martins	Jairo Ferreira Filho
Popular vote	531,029	390,254
Percentage	57.64%	42.36%
Mayor before election
Rafael Greca
PSD
Elected mayor
Eduardo Pimentel
PSD
- Municipal Chamber
- All 38 seats in the Municipal Chamber of Curitiba; 20 seats needed for a majority
Party	Leader	Vote %	Seats	+/–
PSD	Beto Moraes	11.16	6	+2
PL	Eder Borges	8.75	4	+4
UNIÃO	Alexandre Leprevost	8.64	4	+4
FE Brasil	Maria Letícia	9.54	3	−1
PP	Oscalino do Povo	7.88	3	+1
Republicanos	Pastor Marciano Alves	7.03	3	+1
PODE	Bruno Pessuti	6.20	3	+1
NOVO	Amália Tortato	5.92	3	+1
MDB	Noemia Rocha	5.19	2	+1
DEMOCRATA	None	4.79	1	+1
PDT	Marcos Vieira	4.14	2	−1
PSB	None	3.43	1	+1
PSOL-REDE	None	3.27	1	+1
Agir	None	2.81	1	+1
PRD	Ezequias Barros	2.70	1	+1
This lists parties that won seats. See the complete results below.

The 2024 Curitiba mayoral election was held in Curitiba on 6 October 2024 to elect the mayor, vice mayor, and 38 councillors of the Municipal Chamber of Curitiba. Incumbent mayor Rafael Greca (PSD) was not eligible to run for a third consecutive term, having been elected in 2016 and re-elected in 2020.

As no mayoral candidate received more than half of the valid votes in the first round, a runoff election was held on 27 October 2024. Eduardo Pimentel won the majority of the votes in the second round and was elected mayor of Curitiba for the 2025–2029 term. At least seven of the elected councillors are aligned with right-wing or far-right politics and have a strong presence on Instagram and YouTube.

== Background ==
=== 2020 election ===
The last mayoral election in Curitiba resulted in the victory of incumbent Rafael Greca, from the extinct party Democrats (DEM), in the first round. Greca obtained 499,821 votes or 59.74% of the valid votes. In the second place, the state deputy Goura Nataraj, from the Democratic Labour Party (PDT), only obtained 110,977 or around 13.26% of the valid votes and the other candidates did not reach double digits in vote percentages.

Greca's victory in the first round is linked to the enormous popularity he had and still has in the city. In December 2023, the mayor's management was approved by around 73% of Curitiba's inhabitants. As he was in his second consecutive term, Greca couldn't run for a third term, due to limitations imposed by the Federal Constitution. Eduardo Pimentel, the Vice Mayor of Curitiba, was chosen as his successor.

=== Electorate ===
In February 2024, Curitiba had around 1,419,395 people eligible to vote, an increase of 5% in the electorate compared to the last election and around 80% of the city's population eligible to vote (1,773,718), according to the 2022 Brazilian Demographic Census. The city is divided into ten electoral zones (1st, 2nd, 3rd, 4th, 145th, 174th, 175th, 176th, 177th and 178th). Voters had until 8 May 2024 to register for the first time or regularize their electoral status, including biometric registration.

== Electoral calendar ==
Electoral calendar announced by the Superior Electoral Court (TSE) on 3 January 2024
7 March – 5 April	Period of the 'party window' for councillors. During this period, the councillors are able to move to other political parties in order to run for election while not losing their respective political terms.
6 April	Deadline for all parties and party federations to obtain the registration of their statutes at the Superior Electoral Court and for all candidates to have their electoral domicile in the constituency in which they wish to contest the elections with the affiliation granted by the party.
15 May	Start of the preliminary fundraising campaign in the form of collective financing for potential candidates. During this period, candidates are not allowed to ask for votes and are still subjected to obey the rules regarding electoral propaganda on the Internet.
20 July – 5 August	On this date, party conventions begin to deliberate on coalitions and choose candidates for mayors and councillors tickets. Parties have until 15 August to register their names with the Brazilian Election Justice.
16 August	Beginning of electoral campaigns on an equal basis, with any advertising or demonstration explicitly requesting for votes before the date being considered irregular and subject to fines.
30 August –3 October	Broadcasting of free electoral propaganda on radio and television.
6 October	Date of mayoral elections.
27 October	Date of a possible second round in cities with more than 200,000 voters in which the most voted candidate for mayor has not reached 50% of the valid votes.

== Candidates ==
=== Confirmed candidates ===
Party	Mayoral candidate	Running mate		Coalition	Broadcast time allocation per party/coalition
Progressistas (PP 11)	Maria Victoria Barros: State Deputy of Paraná (2015–present)	Progressistas (PP)	Walter Petruzziello: Lawyer; Candidate for Second Alternate of the senatorial candidate Alex Canziani (PTB) in the 2018 Paraná senatorial election.	Curitiba Better for Everyone: Progressistas (PP); Democratic Renewal Party (PRD)	1 minute and 7 seconds
United Socialist Workers' Party (PSTU 16)	Samuel Mattos: Mailman and mathematician; Candidate for Vice Mayor in the 2020 Curitiba mayoral election	United Socialist Workers' Party (PSTU)	Leonardo Martinez: Rideshare driver	—N/a	—N/a
Workers' Cause Party (PCO 29)	Felipe Bombardelli: Engineer of Development at Siemens AG	Workers' Cause Party (PCO)	Paulo Costycha: Mailman	—N/a	—N/a
National Mobilization (MOBILIZA 33)	Roberto Requião: Senator for Paraná (1995–2003; 2011–2019); Governor of Paraná (1991–1994; 2003–2010); Mayor of Curitiba (1986–1989); State Deputy of Paraná (1983–1986)	National Mobilization (MOBILIZA)	Marcelo Henrique Pinto: Parliamentary Advisor in the Chamber of Deputies of Brazil (2018–2022); Company administrator	—N/a	—N/a
Brazilian Woman's Party (PMB 35)	Cristina Graeml: Journalist at Gazeta do Povo (2020–2024)	Brazilian Woman's Party (PMB)	Jairo Ferreira Filho: Lawyer	—N/a	—N/a
Brazilian Socialist Party (PSB 40)	Luciano Ducci: Federal Deputy from Paraná (2015–present); Mayor of Curitiba (2010–2013); Vice Mayor of Curitiba (2005–2010); State Deputy of Paraná (2003–2004)	Democratic Labour Party (PDT)	Goura Nataraj: State Deputy of Paraná (2019–present); Councillor of Curitiba (2017–2019)	A More Social and Human Curitiba: Brazilian Socialist Party (PSB); Democratic Labour Party (PDT); Brazil of Hope (PT, PCdoB, PV)	2 minutes and 12 seconds
Brazil Union (UNIÃO 44)	Ney Leprevost: State Deputy of Paraná (2007–2018; 2023–present); Federal Deputy from Paraná (2019–2023); Councillor of Curitiba (1997–2006)	Brazil Union (UNIÃO)	Rosangela Moro: Federal Deputy from São Paulo (2023–present)	Curitiba Can Achieve More: Brazil Union (UNIÃO); Christian Democracy (DC); Act (AGIR)	1 minute and 14 seconds
Socialism and Liberty Party (PSOL 50)	Andrea Caldas: University professor at the Federal University of Paraná (UFPR)	Socialism and Liberty Party (PSOL)	Letícia Faria: Nurse	PSOL REDE Federation (PSOL, REDE)	25 seconds
Social Democratic Party (PSD 55)	Eduardo Pimentel: Vice Mayor of Curitiba (2017–2025)	Liberal Party (PL)	Paulo Martins: Federal Deputy from Paraná (2019–2023)	Curitiba Love and Innovation: Social Democratic Party (PSD); Liberal Party (PL); Podemos (PODE); Republicanos; New Party (NOVO); Brazilian Democratic Movement (MDB); Avante	4 minutes and 42 seconds
Solidarity (Solidariedade 77)	Luizão Goulart: Federal Deputy from Paraná (2019–2023); Mayor of Pinhais (2009–2017); Councillor of Pinhais (1997–2005); President of the Municipal Chamber of Pinhais (2001–2002)	Solidarity (Solidariedade)	Tiago Chico: Technological Director of the Curitiba Development and Innovation Agency (2017–2018); Civil engineer	—N/a	17 seconds

=== Declined to run ===
- Bruno Meirinho (PSOL) – Candidate for mayor of Curitiba in the 2008 elections and in the 2012 elections. Lawyer. The Socialism and Liberty Party, in a board meeting, decided on 13 April 2024 to officially support the potential candidacy of Andrea Caldas, thus removing the possibility of Meirinho becoming the party's nominee in the election.
- Deltan Dallagnol (NOVO) – Member of the Chamber of Deputies from Paraná (2023) and retired federal prosecutor. The former Lava Jato prosecutor announced the withdrawal of his potential candidacy on 3 May 2024. He states that he will dedicate himself to campaigns and the training of his own party's politicians throughout Brazil. He announced his support to Pimentel's candidacy.
- Carol Dartora (PT) – Councillor of Curitiba (2021–2023) and member of the Chamber of Deputies from Paraná (2023–present).
- Zeca Dirceu (PT) – Mayor of Cruzeiro do Oeste (2005–2010), member of the Chamber of Deputies from Paraná (2011–present) and businessman.
- Felipe Mongruel (PT) – Lawyer.
- Paulo Martins (PL) – Member of the Chamber of Deputies from Paraná (2016; 2019–2023) and journalist. The Liberal Party nominated Martins as the running mate of Pimentel on 25 May 2024.
- Ricardo Arruda (PL) – Member of the Chamber of Deputies from Paraná (2013) and member of the Legislative Assembly of Paraná (2015–present).
- David Antunes (Cidadania) – Coordinator of Casa LGBT CWB and candidate for state deputy in the 2022 Paraná state elections.
- Goura Nataraj (PDT) – Councillor of Curitiba (2017–2019), member of the Legislative Assembly of Paraná (2019–present), candidate in the 2020 Curitiba mayoral election and philosopher.
- Beto Richa (PSDB) – Member of the Legislative Assembly of Paraná (1995–2001), Vice Mayor of Curitiba (2001–2005), Mayor of Curitiba (2005–2010), Governor of Paraná (2011–2018), member of the Chamber of Deputies from Paraná (2023–present) and engineer.

The Workers' Party, through its National Executive, announced its support for the potential candidacy of former mayor Luciano Ducci on 27 May 2024. As a result of this decision, none of the party’s potential candidates at the time were able to secure their candidacies. The Workers' Party National Directorate also signaled support for candidates from other parties aligned with the federal government in Congress, such as the Brazilian Socialist Party itself. Dartora and Mongruel chose not to appeal the decision made by the National Executive, thereby ending their intentions to run; only Zeca Dirceu opted to appeal to the National Directorate, which ultimately confirmed its support for Ducci. Alongside with the Workers' Party, the other parties that make up the Brazil of Hope alliance (FE Brasil), such as PCdoB and PV, also endorsed Ducci’s candidacy. Goura Nataraj was confirmed as Luciano Ducci’s running mate on 24 July 2024, following a decision of the National Executive of the Democratic Labour Party.

According to journalist Esmael Morais, the Liberal Party decided to support the potential candidacy of Eduardo Pimentel and nominated Paulo Eduardo Martins to be his running mate on the mayoral election. As a result, the state deputy Ricardo Arruda— another potential candidate from the party—will no longer be in the race. In Morais’s analysis, Martins' nomination also represented a political setback for the incumbent mayor Rafael Greca. Greca had intended to nominate either his Secretary of Government, Luís Fernando Jamur, or the Secretary of the Environment, Marilza Dias, for the spot. However, both names were rejected by political groups aligned with former President Jair Bolsonaro and Paraná’s governor Ratinho Júnior. After Rafael Greca publicly criticized Jair Bolsonaro on 21 July 2024, the former president took a photo with Cristina Graeml near the party convention period—and stated that his party might take a different path, possibly endorsing her candidacy instead. Nevertheless, after Brazil Union refused to withdraw Leprevost’s candidacy and to nominate a running mate on Pimentel’s ticket, Martins’s nomination was announced on 25 July 2024.

David Antunes withdrew his candidacy for mayor on 25 July 2024 in order to build a strong ticket, with strong candidates for the Municipal Chamber of Curitiba in the October elections. At the same meeting, the party declared its support for Eduardo Pimentel's candidacy. On 5 August 2024, Beto Richa withdrew his candidacy. The reasons that led him to make this decision were: a lack of party political broadcast time to present his proposals and a disagreement between some groups of Cidadania with a possible support for his candidacy. Cidadania is a party that has a national alliance (Always Forward – PSDB/Cidadania) with the Brazilian Social Democracy Party. Richa defends the neutrality of his party in the election.

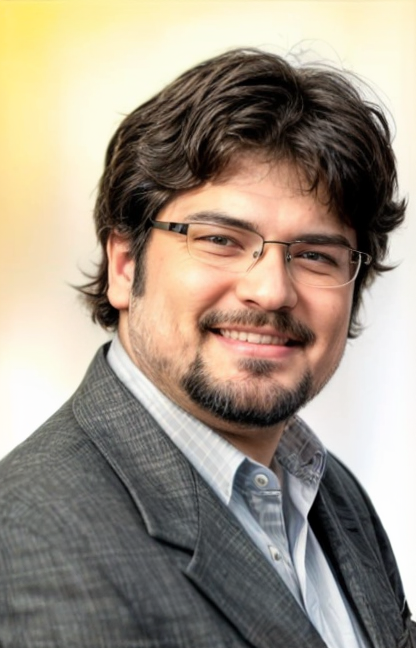
Lawyer
Bruno Meirinho (PSOL)
from Curitiba

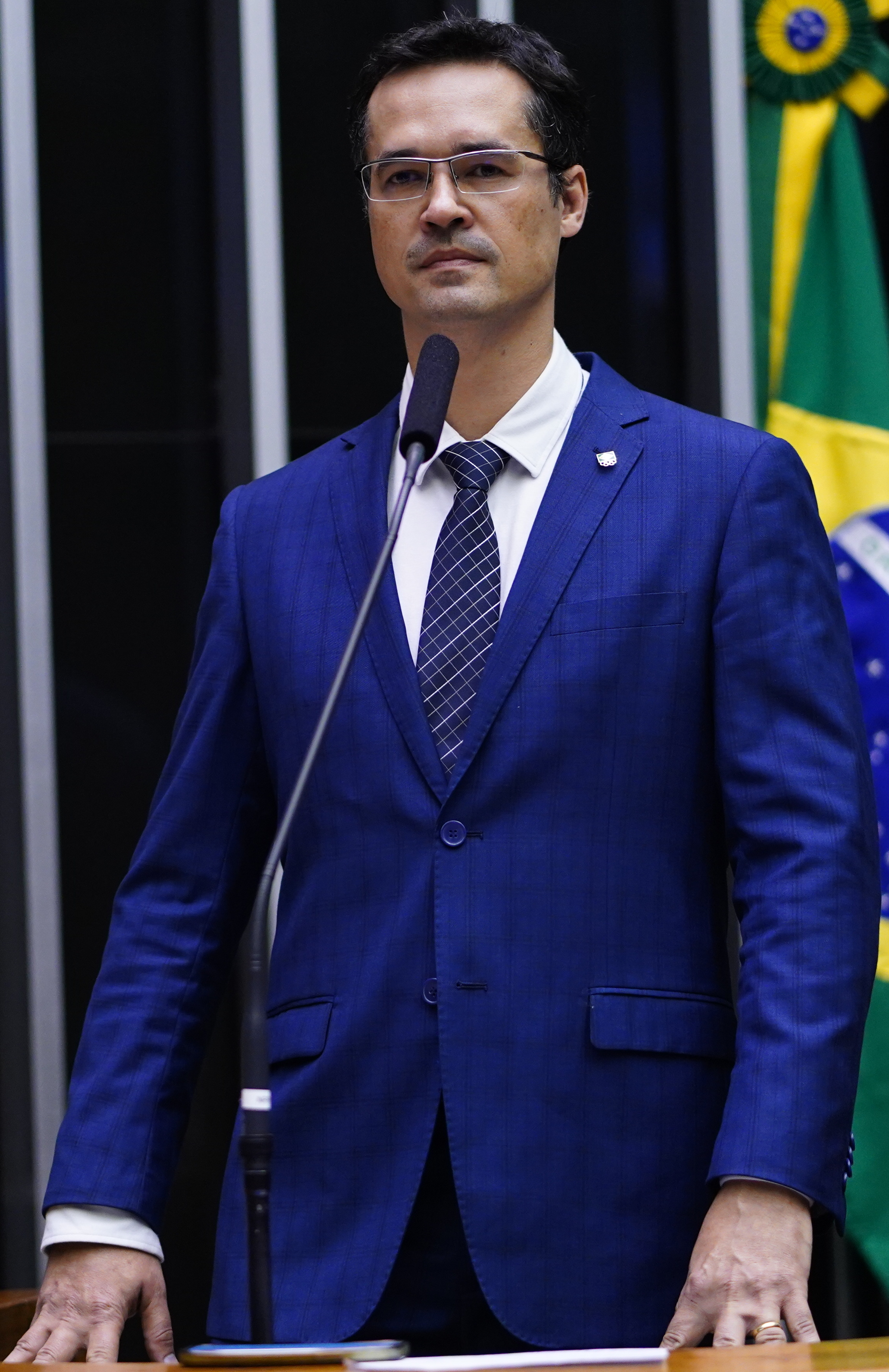
Federal Deputy
Deltan Dallagnol (NOVO)
from Pato Branco

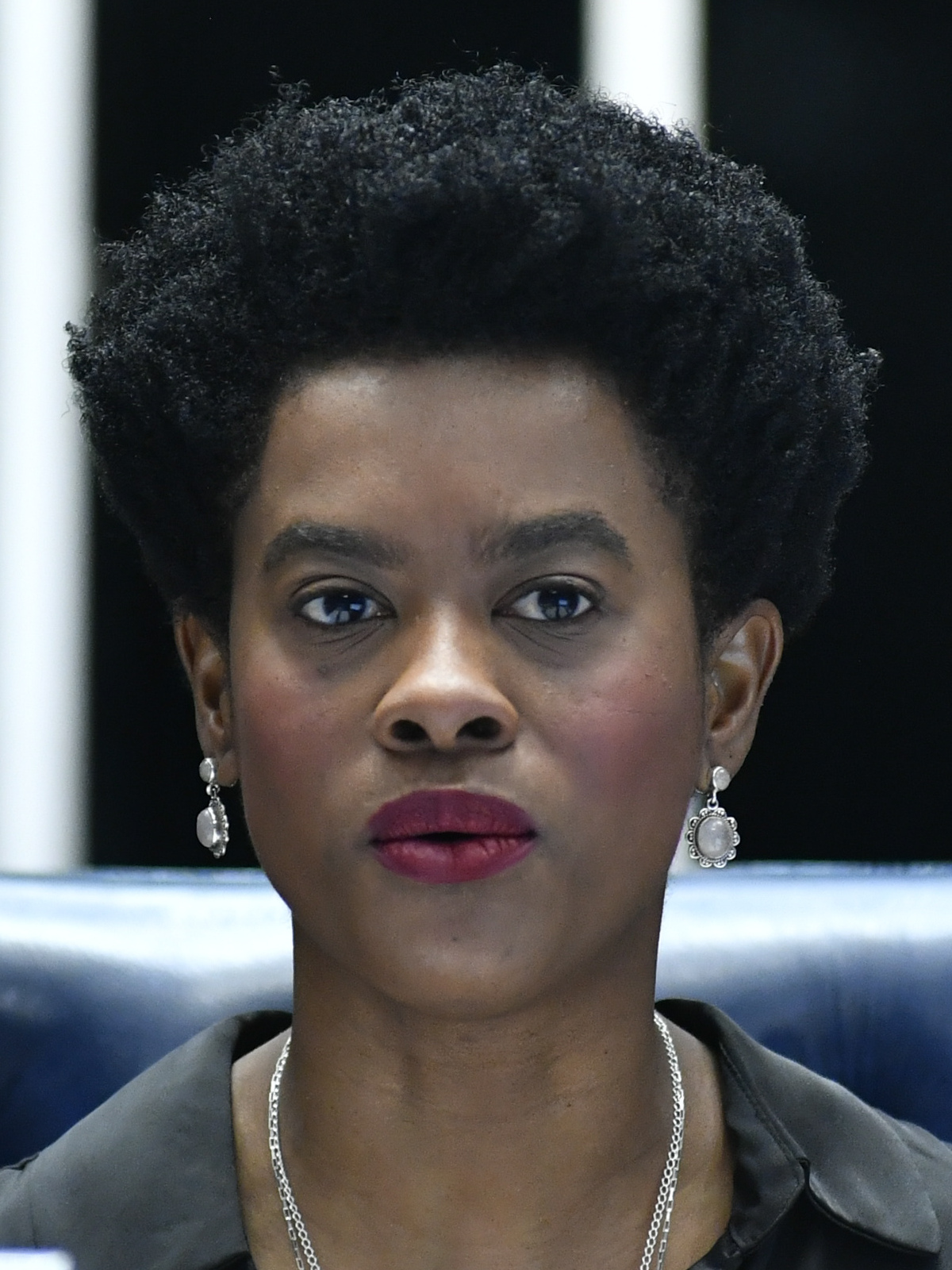
Federal Deputy
Carol Dartora (PT)
from Curitiba

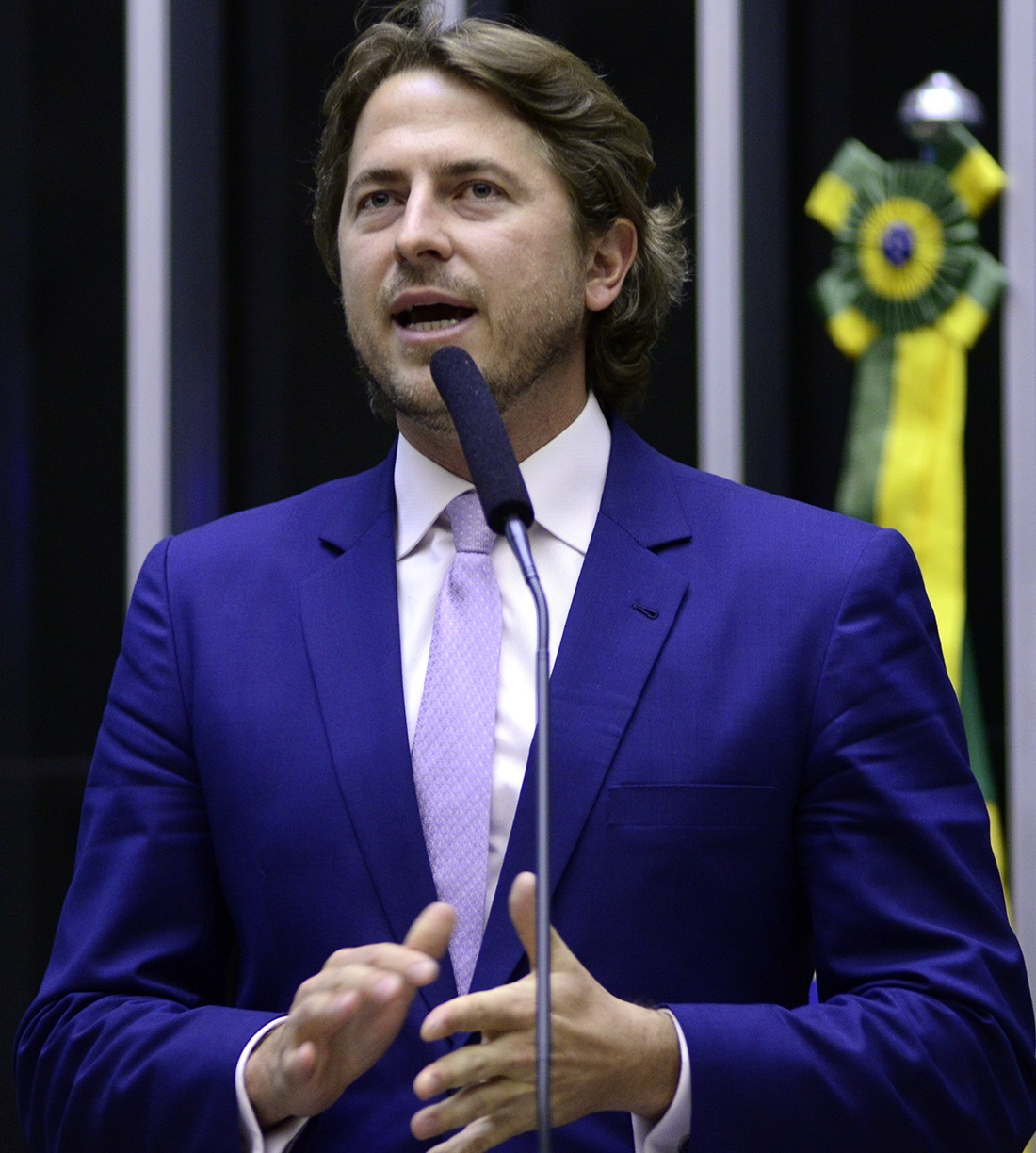
Federal Deputy
Zeca Dirceu (PT)
from Umuarama

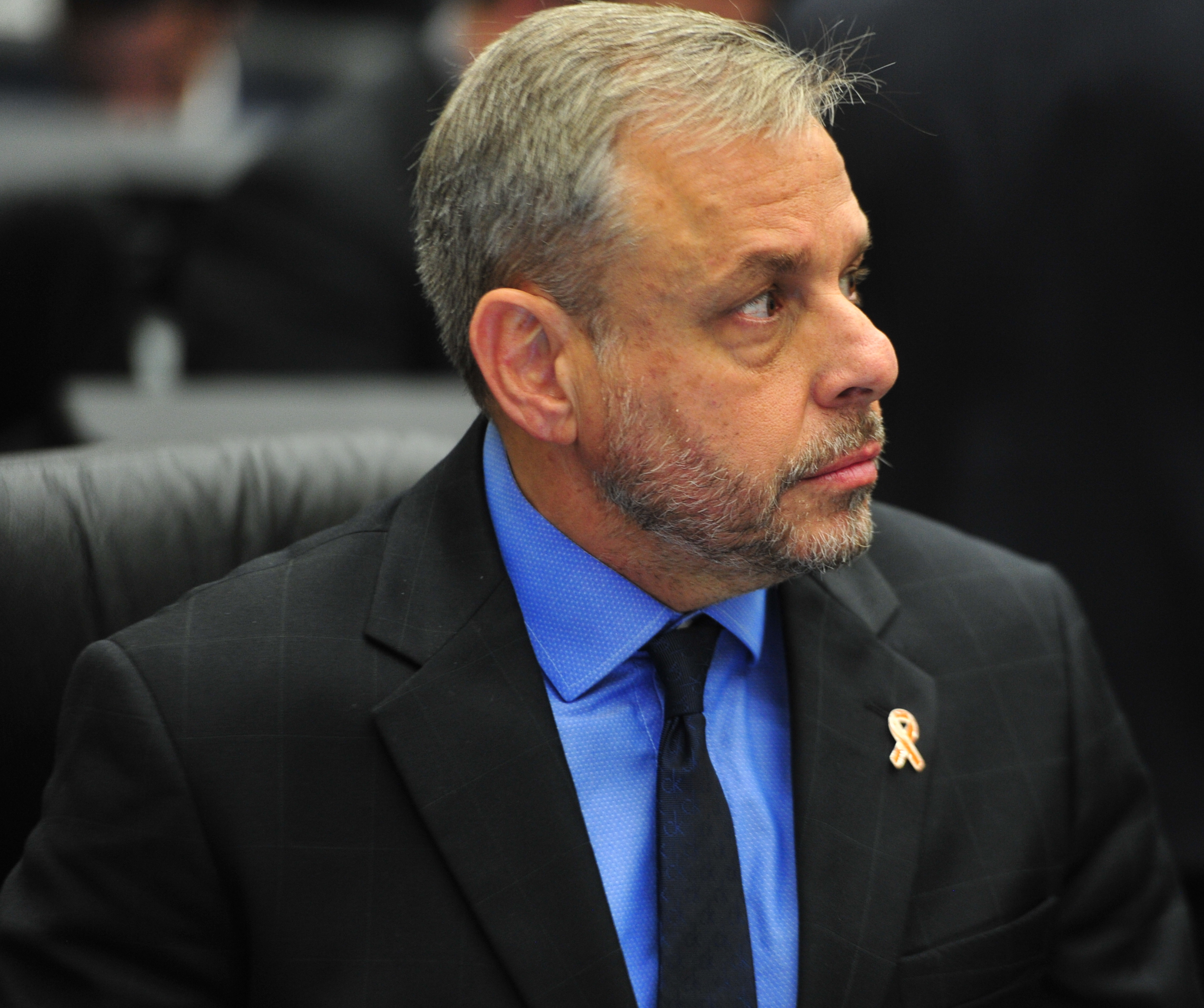
State Deputy
Ricardo Arruda (PL)
from São Paulo

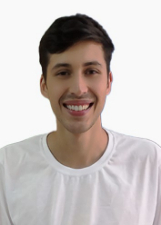
Coordinator of Casa LGBT CWB
David Antunes (Cidadania)
from Piraquara

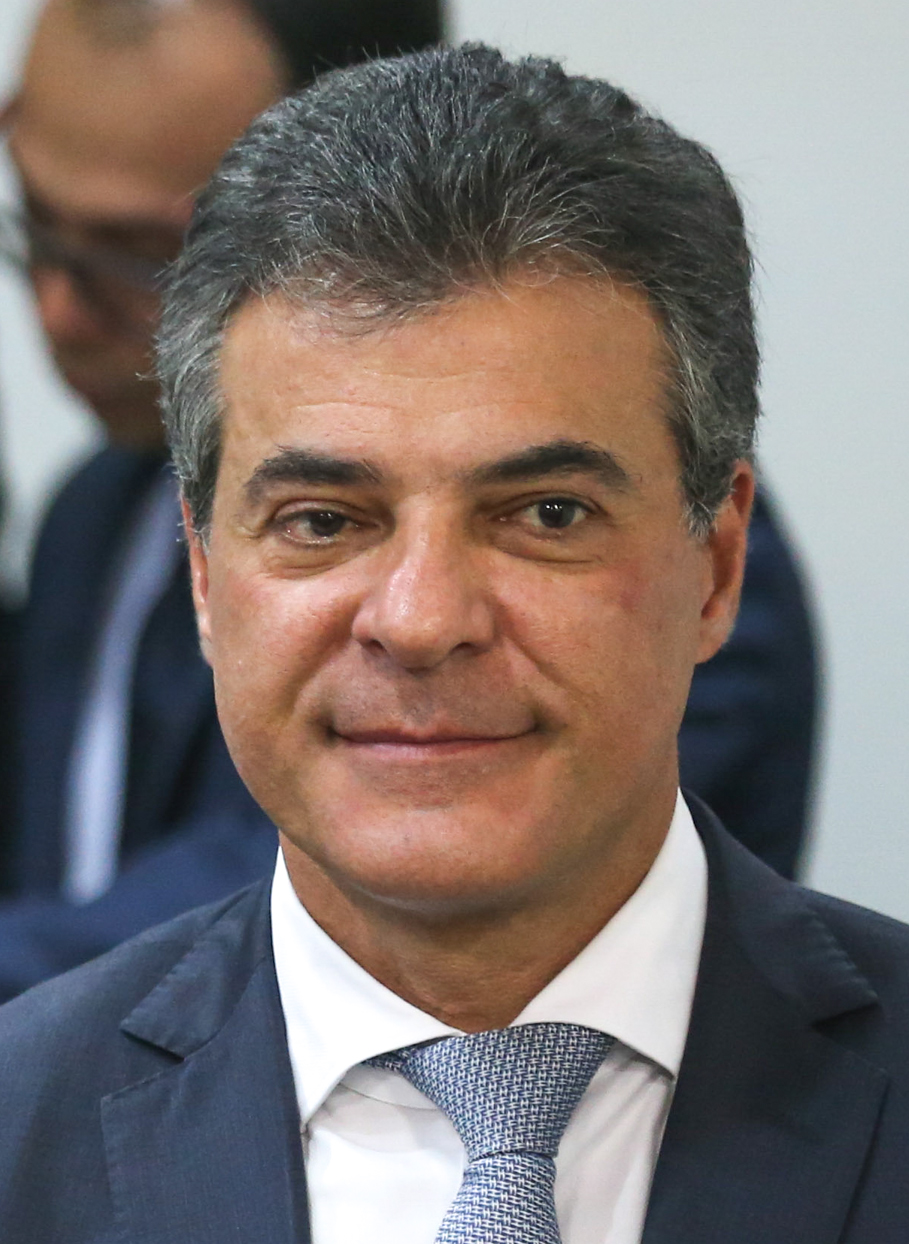
Federal Deputy
Beto Richa (PSDB)
from Londrina

=== Candidacy under legal review ===
On 26 January 2024, the Brazilian Woman's Party (PMB) announced journalist Cristina Graeml as a potential candidate for the Curitiba City Hall. She left Gazeta do Povo, where she worked as a columnist from January 2020 to April 2024, to run for the position. However, there was uncertainty regarding the party convention that would officially confirm her candidacy in August due to a legal dispute involving the PMB's National President, Suêd Haidar, and the party's local executives in Paraná. On 3 August, Haidar decided to dissolve the local PMB executives and removed Geonísio Marinho from his position as the municipal president of PMB Curitiba to prevent the convention that would officially confirm Graeml’s candidacy. Despite this, the convention was confirmed by the state president of the PMB Paraná Executive Committee, Fabiano dos Santos, and took place as scheduled on the evening of 5 August. Cristina Graeml’s candidacy was officially confirmed, and the slate of candidates for the Municipal Chamber of Curitiba by the PMB was also formalized at the same event.

The legal dispute continued, and on the last day of the convention, the local PMB executives in Paraná and Curitiba filed a writ of mandamus with the Regional Electoral Court of Paraná (TRE-PR) to challenge the legal effects of the intervention by the National Executive. On 7 August, the electoral judge Cláudia Cristina Cristofani ruled that the state electoral court did not have authority to judge the case. She argued that, since this was a decision by the National Executive of the Brazilian Woman's Party, the Superior Electoral Court (TSE) would be the appropriate instance to decide on this legal matter and only it could decide on the maintenance of Cristina Graeml’s candidacy. On 23 August, the Superior Electoral Court, through a preliminary injunction issued by Floriano de Azevedo Marques Neto, reversed the dissolution of the PMB Executive in Curitiba—this decision came after the convention had already taken place. In early September of the same year, Cristina Graeml’s candidacy was approved by the Electoral Court.

== Outgoing Municipal Chamber ==
The result of the last municipal election and the current situation in the Municipal Chamber is given below:

Affiliation	Members		+/–
Affiliation	Elected	April 2024 (Note: Between March and April 2024, councilors were able to change parties during the so-called "party window" without losing their respective terms.)	+/–
PSD	4	8 (Note: Mauro Ignácio, Sabino Picolo, Serginho do Posto, Toninho da Farmácia and Zezinho Sabará, all previously affiliated with the Brazil Union (UNIÃO) are the four councillors who joined the Social Democratic Party (PSD) during the "party window".)	▲4
MDB	1	4 (Note: Tito Zeglin, previously affiliated with the Democratic Labour Party (PDT) and João da 5 Irmãos (previously affiliated with the Brazil Union (UNIÃO) joined the Brazilian Democratic Movement (MDB) during the party window.)	▲3
PP	2	4 (Note: Mauro Bobato, previously affiliated with Podemos (PODE) joined Progressistas (PP) during the party window, and in the same period, Eder Borges left the party.)	▲2
PODE	2	4 (Note: Leonidas Dias, previously affiliated with Solidariedade and Sargento Tânia Guerreiro, previously affiliated with the Brazil Union (UNIÃO) joined Podemos during the party window, and in the same period, Mauro Bobato left the party.)	▲2
PT	3	3	Steady
PL	0	2 (Note: Eder Borges, previously affiliated with Progressistas (PP) and Rodrigo Reis (previously affiliated with the Brazil Union (UNIÃO) are the two councillors who joined PL during the party window.)	▲2
PRD	didn't exist	2 (Note: Ezequias Barros, previously affiliated with the Brazilian Woman's Party (PMB), joined the Democratic Renewal Party (PRD) during the party window.)	▲2
NOVO	2	2	Steady
Republicanos	2	2 (Note: Hernani, previously affiliated with the Brazilian Socialist Party (PSB) and Pastor Marciano Alves (previously affiliated with Solidariedade) joined the Republicans during the party window, and in the same period, Osias Moraes left the party.)	Steady
UNIÃO	didn't exist	1 (Note: All the eight councillors affiliated with UNIÃO (Mauro Ignácio, Sabino Picolo, Serginho do Posto, Toninho da Farmácia, Zezinho Sabará, Rodrigo Reis, Sargento Tânia Guerreiro and João da 5 Irmãos) left the party in April 2024, during the so-called "party window". As a result, the UNIÃO bench was emptied until Alexandre Leprevost (previously affiliated with Solidariedade) joined the party.)	▲1
PRTB	0	1 (Note: Osias Moraes (previously affiliated with the Republicans) joined the Brazilian Labour Renewal Party (PRTB) during the party window.)	▲1
REDE	0	1 (Note: Salles do Fazendinha, previously affiliated with the Christian Democracy (DC), joined Sustainability Network (REDE) during the party window.)	▲1
Cidadania	1	1	Steady
PV	1	1	Steady
Solidarity	2	1 (Note: Dalton Borba, previously affiliated with the Democratic Labour Party (PDT) joined Solidariedade during the party window; and in the same period, the councillors Leonidas Dias, Alexandre Leprevost and Pastor Marciano Alves left the party.)	▼1
PDT	3	1 (Note: Councillors Dalton Borba and Tito Zeglin left the party during the party window.)	▼2
PSB	1	0 (Note: Hernani left the party during the party window, leaving the party without representation in the Municipal Chamber of Curitiba.)	▼1
DC	1	0 (Note: Salles do Fazendinha left the party during the party window, leaving the party without representation in the Municipal Chamber of Curitiba.)	▼1
DEMOCRATA	1	0 (Note: Ezequias Barros left the party during the party window, leaving the party without representation in the Municipal Chamber of Curitiba.)	▼1
PROS	1	extinct party (Note: The Republican Party of the Social Order (PROS) merged into Solidariedade in February 2023.)	▼1
PTB	1	extinct party (Note: Brazilian Labour Party (PTB) and Patriota merged into the Democratic Renewal Party (PRD) in November 2023.)	▼1
PSC	1	extinct party (Note: The Social Christian Party (PSC) merged into Podemos in June 2023.)	▼1
Patriota	1	extinct party (Note: Brazilian Labour Party (PTB) and Patriota merged into the Democratic Renewal Party (PRD) in November 2023.)	▼1
PSL	3	extinct party (Note: Democrats (DEM) and the Social Liberal Party (PSL) merged into the Brazil Union in February 2022.)	▼3
DEM	5	extinct party (Note: Democrats (DEM) and the Social Liberal Party (PSL) merged into the Brazil Union in February 2022.)	▼5
Total	38		

== Debates ==
=== First round ===
Below is a list of the mayoral debates scheduled or held for the 2024 election (times in UTC−03:00).

According to the electoral rules, broadcasters can only invite candidates to the debate if they receive the agreement of at least two-thirds of the candidates in a majoritarian election (for the mayor position), or at least two-thirds of the parties or federations with candidates in a proportional election (for the councillor position). If an agreement cannot be reached, radio and television broadcasters may hold joint debates for the mayor position, with all candidates present, or in groups, with the presence of at least three people.

Due to the crisis that unfolded within the Brazilian Woman's Party (PMB) following the dissolution of the local executives by the National Directorate and the suspension of Cristina Graeml's candidacy, she was not invited to the first Band debate. The conglomerate announced the decision of not inviting Graeml to the debate on the evening of 8 August. She criticized Band Paraná for considering the decision to 'uninvite' her from the debate as undemocratic, especially after she had arrived at the broadcaster at the scheduled time and was forced to return home, stated that she had prepared for the debate and, while the event was being broadcast on television, she hosted a live stream on social media to answer the questions directed at the other candidates.

2024 Curitiba mayoral election debates
No.	Date, time, and location	Hosts	Moderators	Participants (Note: Debates broadcast on television or radio were legally required to invite all candidates whose parties or coalitions had at least five members in the National Congress based on the most recent election. The candidates listed in this table satisfied this condition.)									
Key: P Present A Absent I Invited N Not invited Out Out of the election				PSD	PMB	PSB	UNIÃO	PMB	PP	Solidariedade	PSOL	PSTU	PCO
Key: P Present A Absent I Invited N Not invited Out Out of the election				Pimentel	Graeml	Ducci	Leprevost	Requião	Barros	Goulart	Caldas	Mattos	Bombardelli
1.1	8 August 2024, 22:15; Pilarzinho, Curitiba	Bandeirantes	Alessandra Consoli	P	N	P	P	P	P	P	P	P	N
1.2	12 September 2024, 20:00; Jardim Botânico, Curitiba	Jornal Plural	Rogerio Galindo	A	P	A	P	P	A	P	P	P	N
1.3	24 September 2024, 10:00; Centro, Curitiba	PUC-PR/DCE	No info available	A	P	A	A	P	P	P	P	P	P
1.4	28 September 2024, 20:40; Pilarzinho, Curitiba	RIC TV/Jovem Pan News	Manuella Niclewicz	P	P	P	P	P	P	P	P	P	N
1.5	3 October 2024, 22:00; Mercês, Curitiba	RPC TV	Wilson Soler	P	P	P	P	P	P	P	P	N	N
2.1	14 October 2024, 22:45; Pilarzinho, Curitiba	Bandeirantes	Alessandra Consoli	P	P	Out							
2.2	19 October 2024, 21:00; Pilarzinho, Curitiba	RIC TV/Jovem Pan News	Marc Sousa	P	P	Out							
2.3	25 October 2024, 22:00; Mercês, Curitiba	RPC TV	Wilson Soler	P	P	Out							

=== Debate between vice-mayor candidates ===
Plural was the only news website to hold a debate among the vice-mayor candidates. Only five of the nine invited candidates accepted the invitation. Both Rosangela Moro, Walter Petruzziello, and Paulo Martins cited scheduling conflicts to justify their absence. Leonardo Martinez claimed to have work commitments.

No.	Date, time, and location	Hosts	Moderators	Participants									
Key: P Present A Absent I Invited N Not invited Out Out of the election				PL	PMB	PDT	UNIÃO	PMB	PP	Solidariedade	PSOL	PSTU	PCO
Key: P Present A Absent I Invited N Not invited Out Out of the election				Martins	Filho	Nataraj	Moro	Pinto	Petruzziello	Chico	Faria	Martinez	Costycha
1	18 September 2024, 18:00; Centro, Curitiba	Jornal Plural	Rogerio Galindo	A	P	P	A	P	A	P	P	A	N

== Opinion polls ==
=== Polling aggregator ===
The CNN Index, developed by CNN Brazil and Ipespe Analítica, does not present sampling numbers or specific collection periods because it does not conduct its own polls. Instead, it aggregates and adjusts data from various polls conducted by different institutes, using statistical techniques and machine learning. The index provides an overview of voting intentions in 100 cities, including capitals, and is constantly updated based on the latest available data. Additionally, the CNN Index typically highlights only the top five candidates, potentially leaving out other relevant candidates.

5–7 August 2024		Beto Richa withdraws his candidacy for lack of political support and party political broadcast time. Cristina Graeml's candidacy was officially confirmed by the Brazilian Woman's Party amid a legal battle that led to the dissolution of the party's local executives and the suspension of the convention. The Superior Electoral Court is set to rule on whether her candidacy can stay on the ballot in the upcoming election.					
3–4 August 2024		Maria Victoria, Roberto Requião and Eduardo Pimentel were nominated by their respective parties as mayoral candidates. Felipe Bombardelli is nominated as a mayoral candidate by the Workers' Cause Party (PCO).					
27 July–2 August 2024		Andrea Caldas is nominated by the PSOL REDE Federation as a mayoral candidate. Luizão Goulart is nominated by the Solidarity as a mayoral candidate. Ney Leprevost is nominated by the Brazil Union as a mayoral candidate.					
24–25 July 2024		Goura Nataraj is announced as Luciano Ducci's running mate. Paulo Martins is announced as Eduardo Pimentel's running mate. Samuel de Mattos is nominated as a mayoral candidate by his party.					
Poll aggregator	Last update	Pimentel PSD	Ducci PSB	Leprevost UNIÃO	Richa PSDB	Requião MOBILIZA	Lead
IPESPE/CNN	8 July 2024	22%	15%	13%	10%	10%	7%
30 May 2024		Deltan Dallagnol's name is removed from the IPESPE/CNN aggregator due to his withdrawal from the race.					
Poll aggregator	Last update	Pimentel PSD	Dallagnol NOVO (Note: Deltan Dallagnol withdrew from his candidacy for mayor at the beginning of May 2024. During that month, some polling institutes still listed him as a candidate, which justified his presence in the IPESPE/CNN polling aggregator. Dallagnol’s name appeared on the aggregator until the end of May. After that period, his name was removed, reflecting subsequent polls that no longer included him in the electoral scenario.)	Ducci PSB	Leprevost UNIÃO	Richa PSDB	Lead
IPESPE/CNN	30 May 2024	17%	16%	13%	11%	9%	1%
27 May 2024		The Workers' Party (PT) announces their support to Luciano Ducci's candidacy for mayor of Curitiba. It's the second time since 2012 that the party will not have a candidate for mayor.					
Poll aggregator	Last update	Pimentel PSD	Dallagnol NOVO (Note: Deltan Dallagnol withdrew from his candidacy for mayor at the beginning of May 2024. During that month, some polling institutes still listed him as a candidate, which justified his presence in the IPESPE/CNN polling aggregator. Dallagnol’s name appeared on the aggregator until the end of May. After that period, his name was removed, reflecting subsequent polls that no longer included him in the electoral scenario.)	Ducci PSB	Leprevost UNIÃO	Richa PSDB	Lead
IPESPE/CNN	14 May 2024	20%	16%	13%	12%	9%	4%
3 May 2024		Deltan Dallagnol announces the withdrawal of his potential candidacy for mayor of Curitiba.					
Poll aggregator	Last update	Pimentel PSD	Dallagnol NOVO	Ducci PSB	Richa PSDB	Leprevost UNIÃO	Lead
IPESPE/CNN	25 April 2024	17%	16%	11%	10%	9%	1%
IPESPE/CNN	22 April 2024	15%	12%	14%	12%	12%	1%
IPESPE/CNN	27 March 2024	16%	13%	14%	12%	11%	2%
IPESPE/CNN	21 March 2024	16%	11%	15%	14%	12%	1%
IPESPE/CNN	18 March 2024	15%	10%	13%	13%	12%	2%
1 January 2024		The election year begins. All election polls from this date onward must be registered with the Superior Electoral Court.					
Poll aggregator	Last update	Ducci PSB	Moro UNIÃO	Pimentel PSD	Martins PL	Carol PT	Lead
IPESPE/CNN	13 December 2023	18%	16%	13%	9%	3%	2%

=== First round ===
Polls are designed to assess what the election outcome would be if it were held on the day the respondents' data were collected. They do not aim to predict the final election result based on the confidence percentage.

2024

Pollster/client(s)	Date(s) conducted	Sample Size	PimentelPSD	Leprevost UNIÃO	Ducci PSB	Requião MOBILIZA	VictoriaPP	Luizão Solidariedade	Graeml PMB	CaldasPSOL	BombardelliPCO	Others	Abst. Undec.	Lead
IRG/Band	22–26 August	1000	28%	14.6%	16%	10%	2.7%	3%	6%	0.7%	0.1%	0.1%	18.7%	12%
Quaest/G1	24–26 August	900	19%	14%	18%	18%	4%	4%	5%	2%	0%	1%	15%	1%
Radar/Tribuna	19–21 August	816	25.1%	15.7%	13.8%	12.6%	5.4%	5%	3.7%	1.2%	0.5%	0.5%	16.5%	9.4%
5–7 August			Beto Richa withdraws his candidacy for lack of political support and party political broadcast time. Cristina Graeml's candidacy was officially confirmed by the Brazilian Woman's Party amid a legal battle that led to the dissolution of the party's local executives and the suspension of the convention. The Superior Electoral Court is set to rule on whether her candidacy can proceed in the upcoming election.											
3–4 August			Maria Victoria, Roberto Requião and Eduardo Pimentel were nominated by their respective parties as mayoral candidates. Felipe Bombardelli is nominated as a mayoral candidate by the Workers' Cause Party (PCO).											
27 July–2 August			Andrea Caldas is nominated by the PSOL REDE Federation as a mayoral candidate. Luizão Goulart is nominated by the Solidarity as a mayoral candidate. Ney Leprevost is nominated by the Brazil Union as a mayoral candidate.											
24–25 July			Goura Nataraj is announced as Luciano Ducci's running mate. Paulo Martins is announced as Eduardo Pimentel's running mate. Samuel de Mattos is nominated as a mayoral candidate by his party.											
Pollster/client(s)	Date(s) conducted	Sample size	Pimentel PSD	Ducci PSB	Leprevost UNIÃO	Requião MOBILIZA	Martins PL	Richa PSDB	Luizão Solidariedade	Graeml PMB	Goura PDT	Others	Abst. Undec.	Lead
Paraná Pesquisas	29 June–3 July	800	24.1%	14.9%	13.6%	12.4%	—N/a	10.1%	1.8%	3%	—N/a	5.7% (Note: Maria Victoria (PP) with 4.4%; Andrea Caldas (PSOL) with 0.9% and Samuel de Mattos (PSTU) with 0.4%)	14.6%	9.2%
Paraná Pesquisas	29 June–3 July	800	24.8%	15.4%	14.5%	12.9%	—N/a	10.6%	1.9%	3.4%	—N/a	1.5% (Note: Andrea Caldas (PSOL) with 1% and Samuel de Mattos (PSTU) with 0.5%)	15.2%	9.4%
Paraná Pesquisas	29 June–3 July	800	27.3%	17.8%	—N/a	13.3%	—N/a	12%	1.9%	3.3%	—N/a	7.2% (Note: Maria Victoria (PP) with 5.8%; Andrea Caldas (PSOL) with 1% and Samuel de Mattos (PSTU) with 0.4%)	17.5%	9.5%
27 May			The Workers' Party (PT) announces their support to Luciano Ducci's candidacy for mayor of Curitiba. It's the second time since 2012 that the party will not have a candidate for mayor.											
Pollster/client(s)	Date(s) conducted	Sample size	Pimentel PSD	Ducci PSB	Leprevost UNIÃO	Requião MOBILIZA	Martins PL	Richa PSDB	Luizão Solidariedade	Carol PT	Goura PDT	Others	Abst. Undec.	Lead
Paraná Pesquisas	8–13 May	800	22.9%	13.1%	12.8%	11%	6.5%	8.1%	1.4%	—N/a	5.4%	3.6% (Note: Cristina Graeml (PMB) with 2.3%; Zeca Dirceu (PT) with 0.8%; Samuel de Mattos (PSTU) with 0.4% and Andrea Caldas (PSOL) with 0.1%)	15.4%	9.8%
Paraná Pesquisas	8–13 May	800	26.4%	14.5%	14.5%	11.6%	—N/a	8.4%	1.6%	—N/a	5.8%	—N/a	17.3%	11.9%
Paraná Pesquisas	8–13 May	800	28.5%	19.9%	19.3%	—N/a	—N/a	10.6%	2.1%	—N/a	—N/a	—N/a	19.7%	8.6%
Paraná Pesquisas	8–13 May	800	34.4%	24.1%	—N/a	—N/a	—N/a	13.9%	2.6%	—N/a	—N/a	—N/a	25%	10.3%
Paraná Pesquisas	8–13 May	800	30.4%	22.9%	22.8%	—N/a	—N/a	—N/a	2.5%	—N/a	—N/a	—N/a	21.5%	7.5%
Futura/100% Cidades	7–8 May	800	15.2%	9.9%	11.2%	9.3%	4.5%	9.4%	1.9%	3.8%	4.3%	10.6% (Note: Fernanda Dallagnol (NOVO) with 3.5%; Rosangela Moro (UNIÃO) with 3.1%; Cristina Graeml (PMB) with 2.7% and Maria Victoria (PP) with 1.3%)	20%	4%
Futura/100% Cidades	7–8 May	800	17.6%	13.1%	13.4%	—N/a	4.8%	8%	1.6%	—N/a	6.4%	13.7% (Note: Cristina Graeml (PMB) with 4.4%; Rosangela Moro (UNIÃO) with 4.2%; Maria Victoria (PP) with 3.6%; Zeca Dirceu (PT) with 1.4% and Valdemar Jorge (NOVO) with 0.1%)	21.2%	4.2%
Futura/100% Cidades	7–8 May	800	17.4%	13.8%	12.4%	10.4%	6.3%	7.7%	—N/a	5.8%	—N/a	5.9% (Note: Fernanda Dallagnol (NOVO))	20.2%	3.6%
3 May			Deltan Dallagnol announces the withdrawal of his potential candidacy for mayor of Curitiba.											
Pollster/client(s)	Date(s) conducted	Sample size	Pimentel PSD	Ducci PSB	Dallagnol NOVO	Leprevost UNIÃO	Martins PL	Richa PSDB	Luizão Solidariedade	Carol PT	Goura PDT	Others	Abst. Undec.	Lead
AtlasIntel	18–23 April	860	17.9%	3.8%	18.2%	7.7%	18%	8.7%	3.1%	7.9%	4.4%	8.4% (Note: Cristina Graeml (PMB))	1,9%	0.2%
AtlasIntel	18–23 April	860	18.4%	4.1%	21.5%	8.3%	—N/a	12.7%	3.8%	—N/a	9%	19% (Note: Cristina Graeml (PMB) with 10.3%; Ricardo Arruda (PL) with 5.2%; Zeca Dirceu (PT) with 3.4% and Maria Victoria (PP) with 0.1%)	3,3%	3.1%
AtlasIntel	18–23 April	860	20.2%	7.9%	—N/a	10.7%	18.1%	10.8%	3.5%	—N/a	—N/a	13% (Note: Cristina Graeml (PMB))	15.9%	2.1%
Instituto Opinião	17–19 April	1,200	13.1%	14.1%	10.8%	12.5%	3.7%	11.7%	2%	3.1%	4.6%	6.4% (Note: Maria Victoria (PP) with 4.1%; Cristina Graeml (PMB) with 1.8% and Andrea Caldas (PSOL) with 0.5%)	18.2%	1%
Instituto Opinião	17–19 April	1,200	19.9%	21.1%	—N/a	19.2%	—N/a	—N/a	—N/a	—N/a	—N/a	13.9% (Note: Maria Victoria (PP) with 5.8%; Fernanda Dallagnol (NOVO) with 4.6% and Cristina Graeml (PMB) with 3.5%)	26%	1.2%
Instituto Opinião	17–19 April	1,200	22.6%	23.5%	—N/a	—N/a	—N/a	14.7%	—N/a	—N/a	—N/a	12.6% (Note: Fernanda Dallagnol (NOVO) with 6.8% and Cristina Graeml (PMB) with 5.8%)	26.7%	0.9%
Ágili Pesquisas	21–25 March	800	17.84%	11.93%	18.72%	—N/a	—N/a	10.43%	4.15%	5.78%	3.77%	—N/a	27.39%	0.88%
Ágili Pesquisas	21–25 March	800	16.56%	13.05%	17.94%	10.16%	—N/a	9.91%	5.14%	—N/a	—N/a	—N/a	27.23%	1.38%
Ágili Pesquisas	21–25 March	800	18.44%	13.05%	—N/a	12.55%	9.03%	10.54%	5.4%	—N/a	—N/a	—N/a	30.99%	5.39%
Ágili Pesquisas	21–25 March	800	16.04%	9.4%	14.16%	10.4%	5.51%	9.4%	2.38%	4.01%	3.88%	—N/a	24.81%	1.88%
Paraná Pesquisas	15–20 March	800	17.4%	15.9%	11%	13.1%	4.9%	14.5%	1.9%	—N/a	5.6%	2.8% (Note: Cristina Graeml (PMB))	13%	1.5%
Paraná Pesquisas	15–20 March	800	21.1%	20.3%	—N/a	—N/a	8%	16.4%	2.1%	—N/a	6.1%	6.9% (Note: Rosangela Moro (UNIÃO) with 6,4% and Valdemar Jorge (NOVO) with 0,5%)	19.2%	0.8%
Paraná Pesquisas	15–20 March	800	25.5%	23.8%	—N/a	22.8%	—N/a	—N/a	3.1%	—N/a	—N/a	0.9% (Note: Valdemar Jorge (NOVO))	24%	1.7%
Radar Inteligência	11–13 March	816	15.8%	12.3%	11.5%	10.9%	4.7%	13.1%	3.2%	2.6%	2.5%	3.3% (Note: Maria Victoria (PP))	20.1%	2.7%
Radar Inteligência	11–13 March	816	24%	17%	—N/a	19.2%	—N/a	—N/a	—N/a	3.9%	3.3%	—N/a	32.6%	4.8%
Radar Inteligência	11–13 March	816	21.5%	17.4%	12%	16.4%	4.4%	—N/a	—N/a	—N/a	—N/a	—N/a	28.3%	4.1%
Radar Inteligência	11–13 March	816	28.3%	23%	—N/a	—N/a	—N/a	—N/a	—N/a	4.4%	3.4%	—N/a	40.9%	5.3%

2023

Pollster/client(s)	Date(s) conducted	Sample size	Dallagnol NOVO	Leprevost UNIÃO	Ducci PSB	Pimentel PSD	Richa PSDB	Luizão Solidariedade	Martins PL	Carol PT	Goura PDT	Others	Abst. Undec.	Lead
Instituto Veritá	13–16 December	900	—N/a	17%	16%	10%	12%	4%	6%	4%	5%	6% (Note: Maria Victoria (PP) with 3% and Fernanda Dallagnol (NOVO) with 3%)	20%	1%
Ágora Pesquisa	11–19 December	1,245	5%	14%	15%	10%	11%	5%	2%	2%	3%	12% (Note: Gustavo Fruet (PDT) with 6%; Maria Victoria (PP) with 2%; Márcia Huçulak (PSD) with 2%; Professor Euler (MDB) with 1% and Denian Couto (PODE) with 1%)	22%	1%
Ágora Pesquisa	11–19 December	1,245	—N/a	15%	16%	12%	—N/a	6%	5%	3%	3%	1% (Note: Denian Couto (PODE))	37%	1%
Ágora Pesquisa	11–19 December	1,245	—N/a	17%	20%	15%	8%	7%	—N/a	—N/a	—N/a	—N/a	35%	3%
Paraná Pesquisas	10–12 December	845	—N/a	16%	16.2%	12.5%	13.5%	2.7%	8.4%	2.8%	5.1%	10.3% (Note: Maria Victoria (PP) with 5.6% and Fernanda Dallagnol (NOVO) with 4.7%)	12.4%	0.2%
Paraná Pesquisas	10–12 December	845	—N/a	19.6%	22.1%	15.9%	—N/a	3.4%	10.8%	—N/a	7.3%	6.9% (Note: Fernanda Dallagnol (NOVO))	14%	2.5%
Paraná Pesquisas	10–12 December	845	—N/a	21.2%	25.2%	16.7%	—N/a	—N/a	11.1%	—N/a	—N/a	8.4% (Note: Fernanda Dallagnol (NOVO))	17.4%	4%
Paraná Pesquisas	10–12 December	845	—N/a	23.1%	27.1%	19.9%	—N/a	—N/a	—N/a	—N/a	—N/a	9% (Note: Maria Victoria (PP))	20.9%	4%
Instituto Veritá	5–7 December	1,002	24.2%	4.6%	1.2%	5.7%	7.6%	1.5%	5.7%	8.7%	3.3%	—N/a	37.5%	15.5%
Instituto Veritá	5–7 December	1,002	26.1%	—N/a	—N/a	9.8%	—N/a	—N/a	7.5%	12.4%	4.2%	—N/a	40%	13.7%
1 November			Luizão Goulart (Solidariedade) announces he will run for mayor in the 2024 Curitiba general election.											
Pollster/client(s)	Date(s) conducted	Sample size	Dallagnol NOVO	Leprevost UNIÃO	Ducci PSB	Pimentel PSD	Richa PSDB	Maria PP	Martins PL	Carol PT	Goura PDT	Others	Abst. Undec.	Lead
Paraná Pesquisas	26–29 October	805	—N/a	—N/a	25.6%	14.7%	—N/a	6.6%	11.4%	6.6%	—N/a	15.3% (Note: Rosangela Moro (UNIÃO))	19.8%	10.9%
Paraná Pesquisas	26–29 October	805	15.5%	14.7%	14.5%	10.8%	13.7%	4.1%	7.5%	5.5%	—N/a	—N/a	13.8%	0.8%
Paraná Pesquisas	26–29 October	805	15.8%	16.3%	19.8%	12.4%	—N/a	5.6%	8.2%	6.1%	—N/a	—N/a	15.9%	3.5%
Paraná Pesquisas	26–29 October	805	—N/a	19%	22.4%	14%	—N/a	6.1%	12.3%	6.7%	—N/a	—N/a	19.5%	3.4%
Paraná Pesquisas	26–29 October	805	—N/a	19.8%	28.1%	17.5%	—N/a	—N/a	—N/a	9.4%	—N/a	—N/a	25.2%	8.3%
IRG Pesquisa	4–8 July	1,200	22%	14.2%	12.6%	11.3%	9.1%	—N/a	6.4%	6%	5.4%	—N/a	12.9%	7.8%
IRG Pesquisa	4–8 July	1,200	—N/a	18.2%	15.5%	14.3%	10%	—N/a	13%	6%	6.2%	—N/a	16.9%	2.7%
Instituto Veritá	July (Note: The opinion poll was carried out in July 2023 by the Instituto Veritá, without specifying a sample size.)	n/a (Note: The opinion poll was carried out in July 2023 by the Instituto Veritá, without specifying a sample size.)	—N/a	5.5%	5.2%	10.8%	4.9%	—N/a	12.3%	2.7%	4.2%	1.4% (Note: Indiara Barbosa (NOVO))	52%	1.5%

=== Second round ===
These are the hypothetical scenarios of a second round.

Luciano Ducci and Eduardo Pimentel

Pollster/client(s)	Date(s) conducted	Sample size	Ducci PSB	Pimentel PSD	Abst. Undec.	Lead
Futura/100% Cidades	7–8 May 2024	800	31.6%	39.7%	28.7%	8.1%
Instituto Opinião	17–19 April 2024	1,200	40.7%	32.8%	26.5%	7.9%
Radar Inteligência	11–13 March 2024	816	28.8%	30.6%	40,6%	1.8%
Instituto Veritá	13–16 December 2023	900	41%	30%	29%	11%
Paraná Pesquisas	10–12 December 2023	845	44%	31.7%	24.2%	12.3%

Luciano Ducci and Ney Leprevost

Pollster/client(s)	Date(s) conducted	Sample size	Ducci PSB	Leprevost UNIÃO	Abst. Undec.	Lead
Futura/100% Cidades	7–8 May 2024	800	34.4%	32.8%	32.8%	1.6%
Instituto Opinião	17–19 April 2024	1,200	39.3%	33.4%	27.3%	5.9%
Instituto Veritá	13–16 December 2023	900	35%	38%	27%	3%
Paraná Pesquisas	10–12 December 2023	845	40.4%	35.1%	24.5%	5.3%

Luciano Ducci and Roberto Requião

Pollster/client(s)	Date(s) conducted	Sample size	Ducci PSB	Requião MOBILIZA	Abst. Undec.	Lead
Futura/100% Cidades	7–8 May 2024	800	40.6%	25.4%	34%	15.2%

Ney Leprevost and Eduardo Pimentel

Pollster/client(s)	Date(s) conducted	Sample size	Leprevost UNIÃO	Pimentel PSD	Abst. Undec.	Lead
Futura/100% Cidades	7–8 May 2024	800	34.8%	35.1%	30.1%	0.3%
Instituto Opinião	17–19 April 2024	1,200	39.4%	31.7%	29%	7.7%
Radar Inteligência	11–13 March 2024	816	29.4%	31.6%	39%	2.2%
Instituto Veritá	13–16 December 2023	900	43%	29%	28%	14%
Paraná Pesquisas	10–12 December 2023	845	41.8%	32.4%	25.8%	9.4%

Ney Leprevost and Roberto Requião

Pollster/client(s)	Date(s) conducted	Sample size	Leprevost UNIÃO	Requião MOBILIZA	Abst. Undec.	Lead
Futura/100% Cidades	7–8 May 2024	800	43.4%	27.6%	28.9%	15.8%

Eduardo Pimentel and Roberto Requião

Pollster/client(s)	Date(s) conducted	Sample size	Pimentel PSD	Requião MOBILIZA	Abst. Undec.	Lead
Futura/100% Cidades	7–8 May 2024	800	45.7%	28.6%	25.7%	17.1%

Hypothetical scenario with Deltan Dallagnol

Eduardo Pimentel and Deltan Dallagnol (withdrawn)

Pollster/client(s)	Date(s) conducted	Sample size	Pimentel PSD	D. Dallagnol NOVO	Abst. Undec.	Lead
Radar Inteligência	11–13 March 2024	816	35.1%	20.5%	44.4%	14.6%

=== Rejection of candidates ===
In some opinion polls, the interviewee can choose more than one alternative (the so-called "multiple rejection"), therefore, the sum of the percentages of all candidates can exceed 100% of the votes in some scenarios.

5–7 August 2024			Beto Richa withdraws his candidacy for lack of political support and party political broadcast time. Cristina Graeml's candidacy was officially confirmed by the Brazilian Woman's Party amid a legal battle that led to the dissolution of the party's local executives and the suspension of the convention. The Superior Electoral Court is set to rule on whether her candidacy can proceed in the upcoming election.												
3–4 August 2024			Maria Victoria, Roberto Requião and Eduardo Pimentel were nominated by their respective parties as mayoral candidates. Felipe Bombardelli is nominated as a mayoral candidate by the Workers' Cause Party (PCO).												
27 July–2 August 2024			Andrea Caldas is nominated by the PSOL REDE Federation as a mayoral candidate. Luizão Goulart is nominated by the Solidarity as a mayoral candidate. Ney Leprevost is nominated by the Brazil Union as a mayoral candidate.												
24–25 June 2024			Goura Nataraj is announced as Luciano Ducci's running mate. Paulo Martins is announced as Eduardo Pimentel's running mate. Samuel de Mattos is nominated as a mayoral candidate by his party.												
Pollster/client(s)	Date(s) conducted	Sample size	Richa PSDB	Requião MOBILIZA	Goura PDT	Ducci PSB	Luizão Solidariedade	Caldas PSOL	Leprevost UNIÃO	Pimentel PSD	Martins PL	Graeml PMB	Could vote in anyone	Others	Abst. Undec.
Paraná Pesquisas	29 June–3 July 2024	800	49%	37.6%	—N/a	17.4%	11.1%	8%	13.8%	12.6%	—N/a	7.2%	4%	18.5% (Note: Maria Victoria (PP) with 12.6% and Samuel de Mattos (PSTU) with 5.9%)	8.9%
27 May 2024			The Workers' Party (PT) announces their support to Luciano Ducci's candidacy for mayor of Curitiba. It's the second time since 2012 that the party will not have a candidate for mayor.												
Pollster/client(s)	Date(s) conducted	Sample size	Richa PSDB	Requião MOBILIZA	Goura PDT	Ducci PSB	Luizão Solidariedade	Carol PT	Leprevost UNIÃO	Pimentel PSD	Martins PL	Graeml PMB	Could vote in anyone	Others	Abst. Undec.
Paraná Pesquisas	8–13 May 2024	800	56.3%	41.3%	12.1%	16%	10.3%	—N/a	12%	10.8%	10.8%	9.9%	3.1%	37.2% (Note: Zeca Dirceu (PT) with 17.5%; Samuel de Mattos (PSTU) with 10.3% and Andrea Caldas (PSOL) with 9.4%)	7.8%
3 May 2024			Deltan Dallagnol announces the withdrawal of his potential candidacy for mayor of Curitiba.												
Pollster/client(s)	Date(s) conducted	Sample size	Richa PSDB	Maria PP	Goura PDT	Ducci PSB	Luizão Solidariedade	Carol PT	Leprevost UNIÃO	Pimentel PSD	Martins PL	Dallagnol NOVO	Could vote in anyone	Others	Abst. Undec.
Instituto Opinião	17–19 April 2024	1,200	51.6%	11%	13%	10.7%	4.8%	7.8%	7.8%	8.7%	8.5%	10.9%	3.4%	18.4% (Note: Fernanda Dallagnol (NOVO) with 6.6%; Andrea Caldas (PSOL) with 6% and Cristina Graeml (PMB) with 5.8%)	9.3%
Ágili Pesquisas	21–25 March 2024	800	43.11%	—N/a	2.51%	6.27%	1.38%	7.39%	3.38%	4.26%	1.75%	6.14%	—N/a	—N/a	—N/a
Paraná Pesquisas	15–20 March 2024	800	47.4%	—N/a	12%	15.9%	6.9%	—N/a	11.5%	8.1%	8.9%	12.5%	5.3%	26.9% (Note: Rosangela Moro (UNIÃO) with 13.3%; Cristina Graeml (PMB) with 7% and Valdemar Jorge (NOVO) with 6.6%)	13.3%
Instituto Veritá	13–16 December 2023	900	55%	20%	16%	13%	13%	13%	11%	9%	9%	—N/a	—N/a	13% (Note: Fernanda Dallagnol (NOVO))	—N/a
Ágora Pesquisa	11–19 December 2023	1,245	31%	6%	6%	9%	1%	3%	6%	4%	<1% (Note: The opinion poll does not specify the exact percentage, but rather a value below 1%)	4%	—N/a	≈8% (Note: Gustavo Fruet (PDT) with 6%; Márcia Huçulak (PSD) with 1% and Denian Couto (PODE) with 1%; Professor Euler (MDB) didn't achieve 1% of the votes.)	20%
Paraná Pesquisas	10–12 December 2023	845	50.8%	8.9%	12%	11.7%	7.2%	6.5%	9.3%	8.5%	7.8%	—N/a	9.8%	14.5% (Note: Fernanda Dallagnol (NOVO) with 7.5% and Ilana Lerner Hoffmann (Ind.) with 7%)	20.7%

== Result ==
=== Mayor ===
Candidate	Running mate	Party	First round		Second round	
Candidate	Running mate	Party	Votes	%	Votes	%
Eduardo Pimentel	Paulo Martins (PL)	Social Democratic Party	313,347	33.51	531,029	57.64
Cristina Graeml	Jairo Ferreira Filho	Brazilian Woman's Party	291,523	31.17	390,254	42.36
Luciano Ducci	Goura Nataraj (PDT)	Brazilian Socialist Party	181,770	19.44		
Ney Leprevost	Rosangela Moro	Brazil Union	60,675	6.49		
Luiz Goulart	Tiago Chico	Solidariedade	41,271	4.41		
Maria Victoria	Walter Petruzziello	Progressistas	20,497	2.19		
Roberto Requião	Marcelo Paula Pinto	National Mobilization	17,155	1.83		
Andrea Caldas	Leticia Faria	Socialism and Liberty Party	8,021	0.86		
Samuel de Mattos	Leonardo Martinez	United Socialist Workers' Party	569	0.06		
Felipe Bombardelli	Paulo Costycha	Workers' Cause Party	341	0.04		
Total			935,169	100.00	921,283	100.00
Valid votes			935,169	90.90	921,283	92.93
Invalid votes			47,728	4.64	41,082	4.14
Blank votes			45,913	4.46	28,979	2.92
Total votes			1,028,810	100.00	991,344	100.00
Registered voters/turnout			1,424,026	72.25	1,424,026	69.62
PSD hold						

=== Municipal Chamber ===
Party or alliance		Votes	%	Seats	+/–
Social Democratic Party		100,293	11.18	6	▲2
Liberal Party		78,623	8.76	4	▲4
Brazil Union		77,702	8.66	4	New
Brazil of Hope	Workers' Party	72,931	8.13	3	Steady
Brazil of Hope	Green Party	7,956	0.89	0	▼1
Brazil of Hope	Communist Party of Brazil	4,883	0.54	0	Steady
Progressistas		70,817	7.89	3	▲1
Republicans		63,183	7.04	3	▲1
Podemos		55,738	6.21	3	▲1
New Party		53,200	5.93	3	▲1
Brazilian Democratic Movement		46,621	5.20	2	▲1
Brazilian Woman's Party		43,052	4.80	1	Steady
Democratic Labour Party		37,169	4.14	2	▲2
Brazilian Socialist Party		30,867	3.44	1	Steady
Agir		25,268	2.82	1	▲1
Democratic Renewal Party		24,263	2.70	1	New
Solidariedade		22,290	2.48	0	▼2
Brazilian Labour Renewal Party		15,838	1.77	0	Steady
PSOL REDE; Federation	Sustainability Network	14,872	1.66	0	Steady
PSOL REDE; Federation	Socialism and Liberty Party	14,559	1.62	1	▲1
Christian Democracy		10,497	1.17	0	▼1
PSDB Cidadania; Federation	Cidadania	10,281	1.15	0	▼1
PSDB Cidadania; Federation	Brazilian Social Democracy Party	8,379	0.93	0	Steady
National Mobilization		7,877	0.88	0	Steady
Total		897,159	100.00	38	–
Valid votes		897,159	87.20		
Invalid votes		52,363	5.09		
Blank votes		79,288	7.71		
Total votes		1,028,810	100.00		
Registered voters/turnout		1,424,026	72.25		
