= Flávio Arns =

Brazilian politician (born 1950)

- Official portrait

Senator for Paraná
- Incumbent
- Assumed office 1 February 2019
- In office 1 February 2003 – 1 February 2011

Vice Governor of Paraná
- In office 1 January 2011 – 1 January 2015
- Governor: Beto Richa
- Preceded by: Orlando Pessuti
- Succeeded by: Cida Borghetti

Secretary for Strategic Affairs of Paraná
- In office 1 January 2015 – 8 June 2017
- Governor: Beto Richa

Secretary of Education of Paraná
- In office 1 January 2011 – 3 April 2014
- Governor: Beto Richa

Federal Deputy for Paraná
- In office 1 February 1991 – 31 January 2003

Director of Special Education of Paraná
- In office 1983–1990

Personal details
- Born: 9 November 1950 (age 75) Curitiba, Paraná, Brazil
- Party: PSB (2023–present)
- Other political affiliations: PSDB (1988–2001; 2009–17); PT (2001–09); REDE (2018–20); PODE (2020–23)
- Profession: Educator
- Flávio Arns's voice Recorded on 1 September 2005

Flávio José Arns (born 9 November 1950) is a Brazilian politician and professor who serves as federal senator representing his home state of Paraná. He was previously vice-governor of Paraná from 2011 to 2015, and also served in the chamber of deputies from 1991 to 2003.

== Personal life ==
Arns was born to Osvaldo Arns and Teresinha Mohr. Of German descent, he is grandson of Gabriel Arns and Helene Steiner. Brought up in a religious Catholic family, he is related to important Brazilian religious figures Zilda Arns and Paulo Evaristo Arns, being the nephew of the former and grand-cousin of the latter. He is married Odenise Teresinha Arns, with whom he had two children: Caroline Arns and Osvaldo Arns Neto.

Arns graduated from Pontifical Catholic University of Paraná in 1972, and the following years graduated with a degree in law from Federal University of Paraná, where he later became professor. In 1980 he graduated with a PhD. in Linguistics with his thesis focusing on language and behavior from Northwestern University in the United States.

== Political career ==
Arns served as director of education for individuals with special needs from 1983 to 1990. He then elected to and served in the Chamber of Deputies for three consecutive terms from 1991 to 2003. He then served as vice governor for Beto Richa in his home state of Paraná as well as holding various positions in the state government. In the 2018 Brazilian general election Arns was one of two members from Paraná, the other being Oriovisto Guimarães, to contest elections in the national senate, where he was elected. Following him taking seat in the senate he was elected vice chair of the Commission on Education, Culture and Sport.

Arns voted against the impeachment of then-president Dilma Rousseff.

A strong supporter of the rights of those with autism and other developmental disabilities, in September 2016 Arns was recognized by the senate of Paraná for his political activism.

Arns has faced some controversy for allegedly hiring Rosangela Moro, the wife of judge Sergio Moro, as a legal adviser in 2015. Judges are prohibited to communicate with active politicians in Brazil, and Moro denied that she ever formally worked for Arns.

On 31 August 2020 Arns announced that he had left the Sustainability Network and joined the Podemos party in the Brazilian senate.
