= Orlando Pessuti =

Brazilian politician (1946–present)

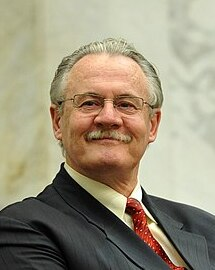

Governor of Paraná
- In office 2 April 2010 – 1 January 2011
- Preceded by: Roberto Requião
- Succeeded by: Beto Richa

Vice-governor of Paraná
- In office 1 January 2003 – 1 April 2010
- Preceded by: Emília Belinati
- Succeeded by: Flávio Arns

State deputy of Paraná
- In office 1 January 1983 – 31 December 2002

Personal details
- Born: 10 March 1953 (age 73) Califórnia, Paraná, Brazil
- Party: PMDB
- Education: Federal University of Paraná

Orlando Pessuti (born 10 March 1953) is a Brazilian veterinarian and politician, affiliated with the Brazilian Democratic Movement (PMDB). He served briefly as the governor of the state of Paraná from 2010 to 2011. He had been previously elected vice-governor in 2002 and reelected in 2006. He became governor after the resignation of then-governor Roberto Requião as he was running for the Federal Senate. He was succeeded by Beto Richa.

== Political career ==
Pessuti was born on 10 March 1953 in Califórnia. He graduated with a degree in veterinary medicine from the Federal University of Paraná (UFPR), and was part of the staff at Emater-PR. He has been active in politics in Paraná since 1977, when he was president of the CEU (Casa do Estudante Universitário). He was first elected a state deputy in 1982, his primary base of support being in the Vale do Ivaí region. It was a position he would hold until the end of 2002. He was reelected in 1986 with 37,723 votes.

From 1986 to 2002, he played a part in the brainstorming of, and later presided over, the Bloco Parlamentar Agropecuário, created in the State Legislative Assembly to defend the interests of rural large-scale farmers. During this period, he participated in the creation of the Paraná state constitution. He was vice president of the assembly. In 1991, he was chosen as a government leader and the leader of the MDB, and in 1993, promoted a meeting between the legislative assembly presidents of the states of Rio Grande do Sul, Santa Catarina, Paraná, and Mato Grosso do Sul.

Pessuti was elected the state legislative assembly president later that year, remaining president until February 1995. During former governor Mário Pereira's trip abroad in 1994, Pessuti briefly assumed the position as interim governor of Paraná from 21 October to 27 October.

He was reelected in 1994 with 44,399 votes, with him being among the 5 most voted for candidates in Paraná. He has been the president of various commissions from the beginning of his time as state deputy, including Agriculture, Industry and Commerce; Ecology and the Environment; and Public Health and Human Resources. He was also the relator-general of the Special Commission on the organic law of municipalities in 1985. He was later elected, in 1999, as the first vice-president of the National Union of State Legislatures (UNALE). He later became the president of the organization. He began projects with the executive committee of the Parliamentary Confederation of the Americas (COPA), an organization that unites representatives from all over the Americas. It was created to, among other things, discuss the Free Trade Area of the Americas. In 2002, in one of his final acts as state deputy, he presided over the CPI dos Alimentos, better known as the CPI do Leite.

Pessuti became the candidate for vice-governor of Paraná in 2002, with ex-governor Roberto Requião as gubernatorial candidate. They were elected and later took office in 2003. He was named state secretary of Agriculture and Supply. He later became president of the Council of the Administration of Businesses, which includes Ceasa, Claspar, Codapar, Emater-PR, and Iapar. Both Pessuti and Requião were reelected in 2006. Later on in 2007, he was named Coordinator of the Revisory Council of the Government of Paraná. In 2008, he became president of the Committee on World Cup Subjects for the 2014 World Cup in Brazil, having the state of Paraná being one of the ones chosen to host the tournament.

He would later become the administrative director of the Regional Development Bank of the Far South.

=== Paraná state government ===
Pessuti became governor of the state of Paraná on 1 April 2010, when Requião renounced his seat to run for the Federal Senate. He supported Dilma Rousseff for president that year.

During his administration, controversy arose when rumours came out that Pessuti had been negotiating with the federal government to return the concessions of the ports of Paranaguá and Antonina granted by the state government in 1949. State deputies and people in the coastal regions of Paraná were against possible negotiations towards federal management of the ports.

The administration of the Ports of Paranaguá and Antonina (Appa) has a publicly owned authority created by the state government in 1947. Currently, the authority is responsible for managing the ports delegated by Delegation Convention nº. 037/2001, amended on 11 December 2001 by the state of Paraná and the federal government for a span of 25 years. It is set to expire on 1 January 2027, with the possibility of a renewal for a new period of time.

Pessuti disputed the "rumours" and said that he had always defended the state control of the ports. He asserted that the news were an attempt of slander and defamation by people with ill intent, creating political discord in the state.

During his administration, he vetoed a law that would have prohibited statewide the showing, caring for, and using of both wild and domestic animals for circus shows. Due to the unanimous nature of support for the law in the state assembly, the state deputies and overruled the governor's veto in November 2010. This came after the proposed law stalled in the assembly for 8 years. State deputy Rosane Ferreira, who started the petition to veto, was a proponent of the bill.

On 2 December 2010, Pessuti left the position briefly to participate at the COP-16 conference that year. The president of the assembly, Nelson Justus, served in the position in an interim capacity for 7 days.

On 3 March 2010, Pessuti became an honorary citizen of the town of Contenda.

=== Later political activity ===
Pessuti became a candidate for the Federal Senate in 2022. He received 63,784 votes, or 1.09% of the vote.
