= Luciano Ducci =

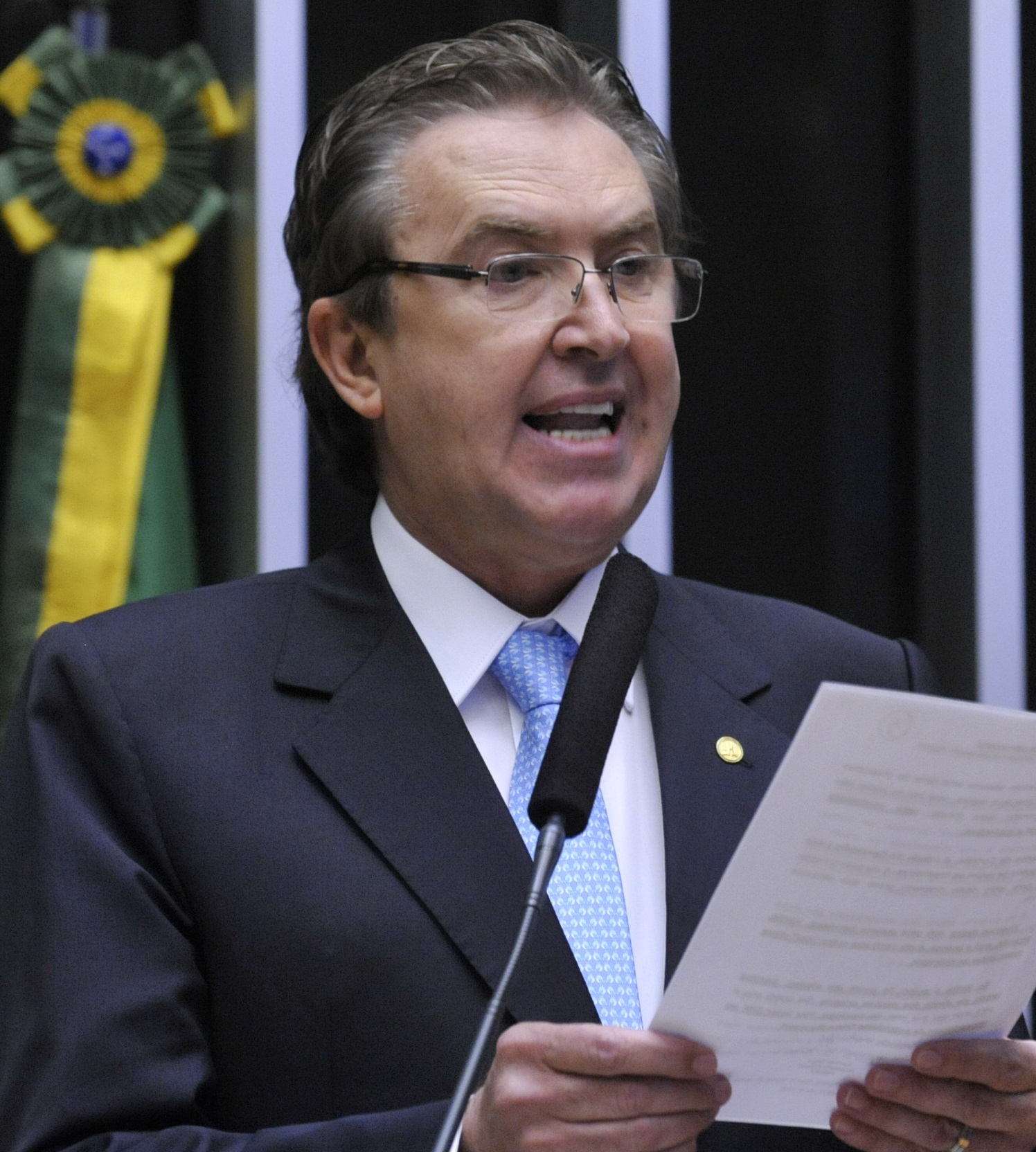

Federal deputy of Paraná
- Incumbent
- Assumed office 1 February 2015

Mayor of Curitiba
- In office 30 March 2010 – 1 January 2013
- Preceded by: Beto Richa
- Succeeded by: Gustavo Fruet

Vice-mayor of Curitiba
- In office 1 January 2005 – 30 March 2010
- Preceded by: Beto Richa
- Succeeded by: Mirian Gonçalves (2013)

State deputy of Paraná
- In office 1 January 2003 – 31 December 2004

Personal details
- Born: 23 March 1955 (age 71) Curitiba, Paraná, Brazil
- Party: PSB (1997–2005); PSDB (2005–2007); PSB (2007–present)
- Spouse: Marry Ducci
- Children: 2
- Education: Pontifical Catholic University of Paraná; Sapienza University of Rome

Luciano Ducci (born 23 March 1955) is a Brazilian doctor and politician, who is affiliated with the Brazilian Socialist Party (PSB). He was the mayor of the city of Curitiba from 2010 to 2012, assuming the role after the resignation of Beto Richa to run for governor of the state of Paraná in 2010. In 2012, he ran to be elected in his own right, but only came in third place in the first round, coming in third by a margin of 0.5% against second place Gustavo Fruet.

== Biography ==
=== Early life ===
Ducci was born on 23 March 1955 in Curitiba to Italian parents. He was the first in his family to be born in Brazil.

=== Political career ===
An employee at Curitiba's Municipal Health Secretary's office since 1987, he was, during this period, a pediatric doctor in the city's health system, where he coordinated the implementation of health surveillance services, as well as medical assistance.

He was the general-director of Paraná's State Secretary of Health, a position that he eventually left to become the Municipal Secretary of Health. He served in this position until 2002, during which time he implemented, among others, award-winning initiatives such as the maternal-infant care program Mãe Curitibana and Alfabetizando com Saúde, which promotes adult literacy efforts through medical content. He left to run for state deputy in 2002.

=== State deputy ===
In 2002, he was elected a state deputy from the PSB. In the Legislative Assembly, he helped to pass projects that gave more resources to health services by means of the application of Constitutional Amendment 29, which outlines specific amounts of money to be applied to programs through the state budget.

=== Mayorship of Curitiba ===
Ducci left the Legislative Assembly in 2004 to be the vice-mayoral candidate for Curitiba in 2004, with Beto Richa leading the ticket. They won that election, and were reelected in 2008. From 2006 to 2010, in addition to being vice-mayor, he was also the Municipal Secretary of Health. On 30 March 2010, he assumed the role of mayor as Richa ran for governor that year. He would remain in that position until 2012.

During Ducci's administration, he was one of the ones responsible for the preparation of the Metrô de Curitiba construction project, including the city in the Mobility PAC of the Federal Government. In 2012, on the eve of his running for reelection in his own right, he was questioned by the magazine Veja about the evolution of his family's wealth after becoming the mayor of Curitiba.

=== 2012 elections ===
In 2012, Ducci launched his candidacy to be reelected mayor of Curitiba in his own right, with federal deputy Rubens Bueno, of the People's Socialist Party (PPS), as his running mate. His coalition was named Curitiba Always Forward, and his coalition included PSB, PSDB, PPS, DEM, PP, PSD, PTB, PRB, PSL, PTN, PSDC, PHS, PMN, and PTC.

Ducci came in third place, behind the second place candidate, Gustavo Fruet of the PDT, by a margin of only 0.45% in the first round. This came in contrast to predictions made from major polling companies prior to the election.

=== Federal deputy ===
In 2014, Ducci was elected a federal deputy with 156,263 votes. He voted for the opening of impeachment proceedings against president Dilma Rousseff. During the presidency of Michel Temer, he voted in favor of the Constitutional Amendment of the Public Expenditure Cap. He voted against the 2017 labor reforms.

He was absent in the August 2017 vote that would have sought to open investigations against then president Michel Temer, helping to archive the complaint by the Public Prosecutor's Office.

=== 2024 elections ===
In 2024, Ducci ran again to become the mayor of Curitiba. He selected Goura Nataraj of the PDT as his running mate. They ultimately finished in third place, failing to advance to the second round.
