= Renato Freitas =

Brazilian politician (born 1983)

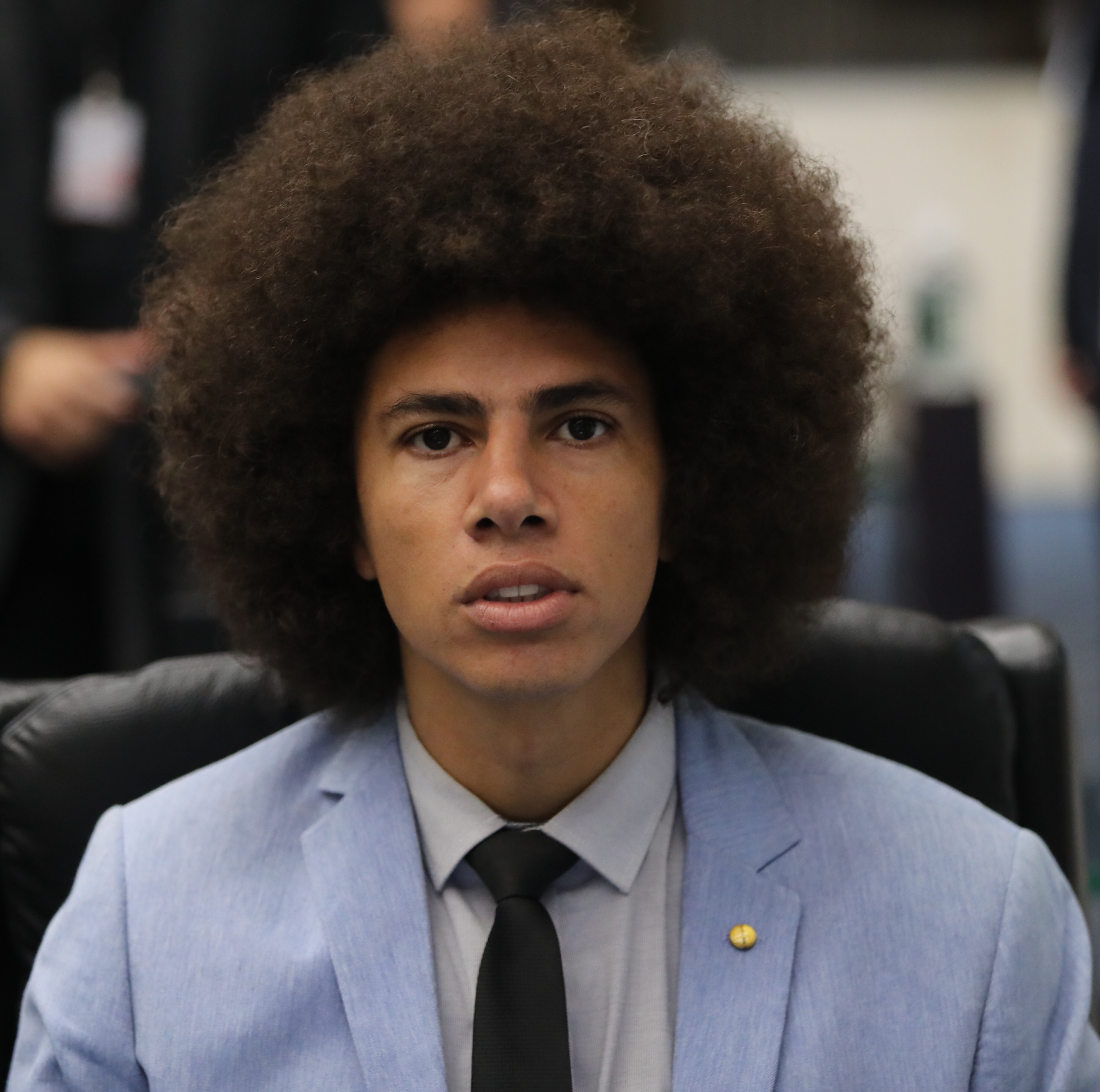
- Freitas in 2023

Member-elect of the Chamber of Deputies
- Assuming office 1 February 2027
- Constituency: Paraná

Member of the Legislative Assembly of Paraná
- Incumbent
- Assumed office 1 February 2023
- Constituency: At-large

Member of the Municipal Chamber of Curitiba
- In office 1 January 2021 – 1 February 2023 (Note: Removed from office on 5 August 2022. Reinstated by the Supreme Federal Court on 10 October.)
- Constituency: At-large

Personal details
- Born: Renato de Almeida Freitas Junior; 12 December 1983 (age 42) Sorocaba, São Paulo, Brazil
- Party: PT (2004–2006, 2018–present)
- Other political affiliations: PSOL (2006–2018)
- Education: Federal University of Paraná

Renato de Almeida Freitas Junior (born 12 December 1983) is a Brazilian politician serving as a member of the Legislative Assembly of Paraná since 2023. He was a member of the Municipal Chamber of Curitiba from 2021 to 2022 and from 2022 to 2023.
