= Cida Borghetti =

Brazilian public administrator, businesswoman and politician

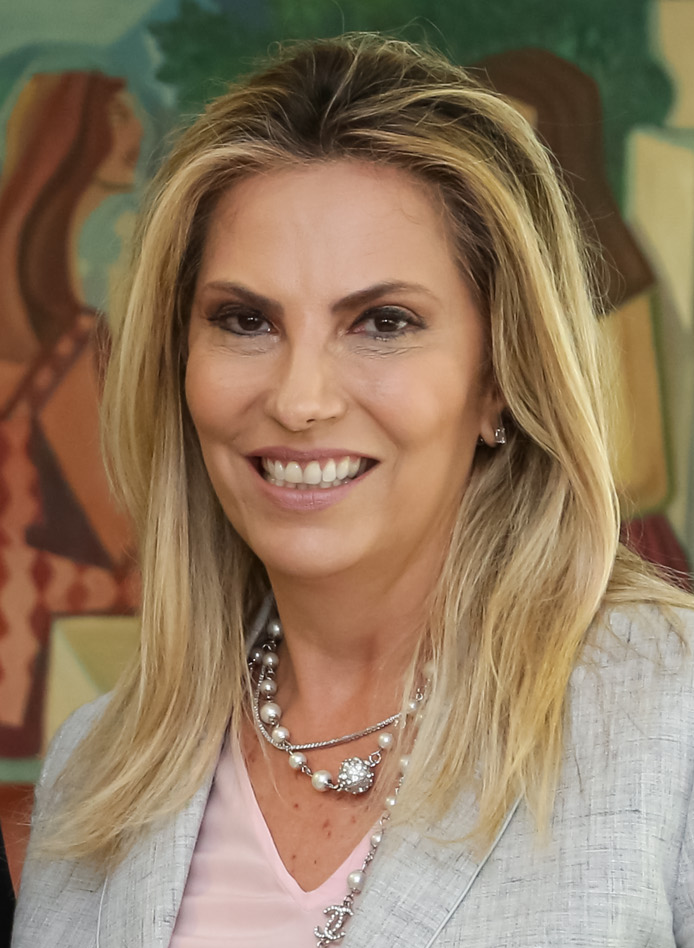

57th Governor of Paraná
- In office 6 April 2018 – 1 January 2019
- Vice Governor: Vacant
- Preceded by: Beto Richa
- Succeeded by: Ratinho Júnior

Lieutenant Governor of Paraná
- In office 1 January 2015 – 6 April 2018
- Governor: Beto Richa
- Preceded by: Flávio Arns
- Succeeded by: Darci Piana

Member of the Chamber of Deputies
- In office 1 February 2011 – 1 January 2015
- Constituency: Paraná

State Deputy of Paraná
- In office 1 February 2003 – 1 February 2011
- Constituency: At-large

Personal details
- Born: Maria Aparecida Borghetti; 18 February 1965 (age 61) Caçador, Santa Catarina, Brazil
- Party: PP (2016–present)
- Other party: PDS (1983–1985); PFL (1985–1995); PP (1995–2013); PROS (2013–2016)
- Spouse: Ricardo Barros
- Children: Maria Victoria Barros
- Profession: Businesswoman

Maria Aparecida Borghetti, commonly known as Cida Borghetti is a Brazilian public administrator, businesswoman and politician, serving as governor of the state of Paraná from 6 April 2018 until 1 January 2019, being the first woman to hold this position.

== Personal life ==
Borghetti is the daughter of Ires Anna Borghetti and Severino Ivo Borghetti. She is married to Health Minister Ricardo Barros, with whom she has a daughter, Maria Victoria Barros, who was elected as a state deputy in the 2014 elections. Maria's wedding in 2017 was disturbed by protesters who were angry at her political position. Borghetti and her husband were there when the bride had to be protected from thrown eggs.

Political offices
Preceded by Flávio Arns	Vice Governor of Paraná; 2015–2018	Vacant Title next held by Darci Piana
Preceded by Beto Richa	Governor of Paraná; 2018–2019	Succeeded by Ratinho Júnior
