= Municipal Chamber of Curitiba =

Municipal Chamber of Curitiba Câmara Municipal de Curitiba
- 18th legislature
- Coat of arms of the city of Curitiba

Type
- Type: Unicameral
- Term limits: None

History
- Founded: 29 March 1693
- New session started: 1 January 2026

Leadership
- President: Marcelo Fachinello, PODE since 21 December 2022
- Government Leader: Tico Kuzma, PSD since 23 February 2023
- Opposition Leader: Professora Josete, PT (Brazil of Hope) since 25 February 2024

Structure
- Seats: 38
- Political groups: Government and allies (34) (Note: There is no formalized division between government support and opposition, but informally only the Brazil of Hope (composed by the Workers' Party and the Green Party) have been allotted time as opposition to discuss any proposal, while all other parties are counted as arguing for the government support base.): PSD/Cidadania Bloc (9): PSD (8) Cidadania (1): PODE/PP Bloc (8): PP (4) PODE (4): MDB (4); PDT/PRD Bloc (3); PRD (2) PDT (1): NOVO (2); PL (2); Republicanos (2); Solidariedade (1); UNIÃO (1); REDE (1); PRTB (1); Opposition (4): Brazil of Hope (4)
- Length of term: Four years

Elections
- Voting system: Open list proportional representation
- Last election: 15 November 2020
- Next election: 6 October 2024

Meeting place
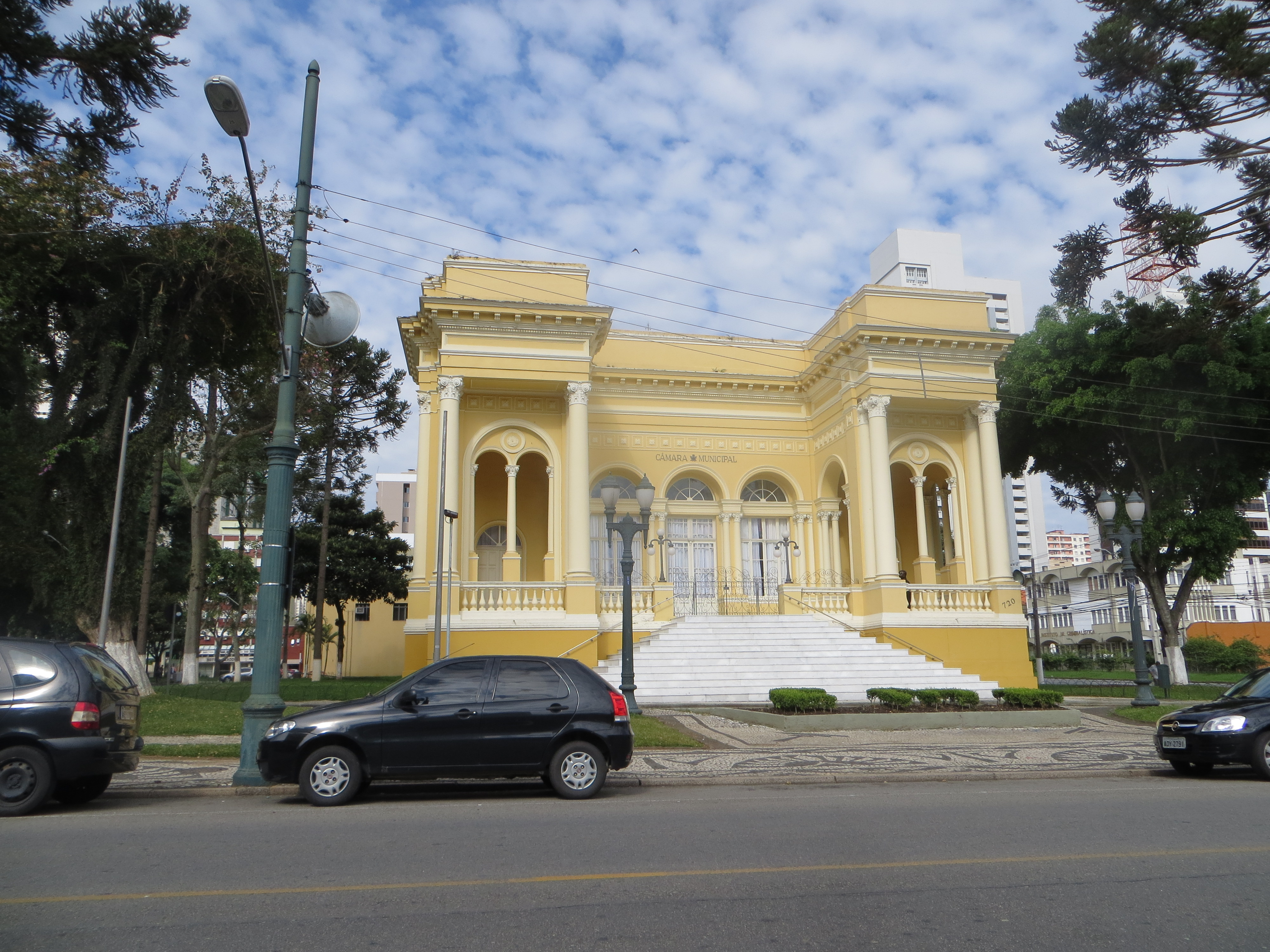
- Rio Branco Palace; Curitiba, Brazil

Website
- https://www.curitiba.pr.leg.br/

The Municipal Chamber of Curitiba (Portuguese: Câmara Municipal de Curitiba) is the unicameral legislative body of the city of Curitiba, the capital and largest city in the state of Paraná in Brazil. It was created on 29 March 1693, the same day the city was founded. It is the oldest public institution of Curitiba and had executive, legislative and also judicial functions when it emerged, as provided for by the legislation of the period.

Since the 14th legislature (2005–2008), the chamber has been composed of 38 councillors elected for a four-year term, with no term limit. The number of elected councillors in cities is determined by the Constitution of Brazil (article 29) and are proportional to the population of each city. The Municipal Chamber of Curitiba prepares and approves laws for the municipality of Curitiba and supervises the acts of the executive branch. The Chamber building is called Palácio Rio Branco (Rio Branco Palace).

== Bureau of the Municipal Chamber of Curitiba ==
The current Bureau of the Municipal Chamber of Curitiba for the 2023-2024 was elected on 21 December 2022:

=== 18th Legislature (2023–2024) ===
Office	Councillor	Party/federation
President	Marcelo Fachinello	Podemos (PODE)
1st Vice President	Tito Zeglin	Brazilian Democratic Movement (MDB)
2nd Vice President	Mauro Ignácio	Social Democratic Party (PSD)
1st Secretary	Osias Moraes	Brazilian Labour Renewal Party (PRTB)
2nd Secretary	Mauro Bobato (interim) (Note: The councillor Maria Leticia (PV) (Brazil of Hope) was suspended from the prerogatives of her position at the Municipal Chamber of Curitiba for six months by decision of the same legislative house from 23 April 2024. She was also suspended from the position of 2nd Secretary until the last week of October 2024. Due to this, Mauro Bobato (PP) will take office as an Interim 2nd Secretary and will leave his position as a 3rd Secretary vacant.)	Social Democratic Party (PSD)
3rd Secretary	Vacant (Note: The position will stay vacant until the last week of October 2024 since Mauro Bobato (PP) took office as an interim 2nd Secretary; this happened due to Maria Leticia's (PV) prerogatives as a councillor being suspended by the Municipal Chamber of Curitiba on 23 April 2024 for six months.)	Vacant
4th Secretary	Leonidas Dias	Podemos (PODE)
Last Update: 16 May 2024 – Source:

== Current composition ==
Parties in the 18th Legislature of the Municipal Chamber (2026)
Party/federation	Floor leader	Seats
Social Democratic	Beto Moraes	8
Brazil of Hope	Maria Letícia	4
Progressistas	Oscalino do Povo	4
Podemos	Bruno Pessuti	4
Brazilian Democratic Movement	Noemia Rocha	4
New	Amália Tortato	2
Republicanos	Pastor Marciano Alves	2
Democratic Renewal	Ezequias Barros	2
Liberal	Eder Borges	2
Brazil Union	Alexandre Leprevost	1
Democratic Labour	Marcos Vieira	1
Solidariedade	Dalton Borba	1
Cidadania	Herivelto Oliveira	1
Sustainability Network	Salles do Fazendinha	1
Brazilian Labour Renewal	Osias Moraes	1
Total		38

=== Councillors of the 18th Legislature (2021–2024) ===
The names used by candidates during the 2020 Curitiba parliamentary election campaign are listed, the party to which they were affiliated on the election date and the number of votes they received. Their terms as councillors expires on 31 December 2024.

Party affiliation	Councillor	Votes	%	Notes
New Party (NOVO)	Indiara Barbosa	12,147	1.53	(Note: Barbosa got a parental leave and left office temporarily from 1 September 2022 to 30 March 2023; the alternate that took office during her maternity leave was Rodrigo Marcial (NOVO).)
Democrats (DEM)	Serginho do Posto	10,061	1.27	(Note: Posto was affiliated to the Brazil Union (UNIÃO), a merger of Democrats (DEM) and the Social Liberal Party (PSL) from April 2022 to April 2024, when he decided to leave the party to join the Social Democratic Party (PSD).)
Workers' Party (PT)	Carol Dartora	8,874	1.12	(Note: Dartora resigned on her parliamentary term on 31 January 2023 to take office as a Federal Deputy at the Chamber of Deputies of Brazil. The alternate that took office after her resignation is Angelo Vanhoni (PT).)
Social Democratic Party (PSD)	Professor Euler	8,315	1.05	(Note: Euler joined the Brazilian Democratic Movement (MDB) on April 2022.)
Social Democratic Party (PSD)	Beto Moraes	8,243	1.04	—N/a
Republicanos	Osias Moraes	7,837	0.99	(Note: Moraes was affiliated to Republicans until April 2024, when he decided to join the Brazilian Labour Renewal Party (PRTB).)
Brazilian Labour Party (PTB)	Pier	7,495	0.95	(Note: Pier joined Progressistas (PP) on April 2022.)
Podemos (PODE)	Denian Couto	7,005	0.88	(Note: Couto resigned on her parliamentary term on 31 January 2023 to take office as a State Deputy at the Legislative Assembly of Paraná. The alternate that took office after her resignation is Bruno Pessuti (PODE).)
Democrats (DEM)	Zezinho do Sabará	6,466	0.82	(Note: Sabará was affiliated to the Brazil Union (UNIÃO), a merger of Democrats (DEM) and the Social Liberal Party (PSL) from April 2022 to April 2024, when he decided to leave the party to join the Social Democratic Party (PSD).)
Cidadania	Herivelto Oliveira	6,441	0.81	—N/a
Democrats (DEM)	Sabino Picolo	6,061	0.76	(Note: Picolo was affiliated to the Brazil Union (UNIÃO), a merger of Democrats (DEM) and the Social Liberal Party (PSL) from Abril 2022 to March 2024, when he decided to leave the party to join the Social Democratic Party (PSD).)
Workers' Party (PT)	Professora Josete	5,856	0.74	—N/a
Democratic Labour Party (PDT)	Marcos Vieira	5,826	0.74	—N/a
Democrats (DEM)	Mauro Ignácio	5,755	0.73	(Note: Ignácio was affiliated to the Brazil Union (UNIÃO), a merger of Democrats (DEM) and the Social Liberal Party (PSL) from April 2022 to April 2024, when he decided to leave the party to join the Social Democratic Party (PSD).)
Social Christian Party (PSC)	Marcelo Fachinello	5,326	0.67	(Note: Fachinello was affiliated to the Social Christian Party (PSC) from January 2021 to June 2023, when the party decided to merge with Podemos (PODE). Since then, he is a member of the later party.)
Workers' Party (PT)	Renato Freitas	5,097	0.64	(Note: Freitas had his mandate as councillor revoked by the Municipal Chamber of Curitiba for breach of parliamentary decorum on 5 August 2022, being temporarily replaced by his alternate, Ana Júlia Ribeiro (PT). However, the chamber decision was suspended by the Supreme Federal Court on 23 September 2022 and he was able to stay in office until 31 January 2023, when he resigned to take office as a State Deputy at the Legislative Assembly of Paraná. The alternate that took office after his resignation is Giorgia Prates (PT).)
Republican Party of the Social Order (PROS)	Tico Kuzma	5,038	0.64	(Note: Kuzma joined the Social Democratic Party (PSD) on 14 March 2023.)
Democrats (DEM)	Toninho da Farmacia	4,853	0.61	(Note: Toninho was affiliated to the Brazil Union (UNIÃO), a merger of Democrats (DEM) and the Social Liberal Party (PSL) from 2022 to April 2024, when he decided to leave and join the Social Democratic Party (PSD).)
Democratic Labour Party (PDT)	Tito Zeglin	4,747	0.60	(Note: Zeglin was affiliated to the Democratic Labour Party (PDT) until April 2024, when he decided to leave and join the Brazilian Democratic Movement (MDB).)
Social Liberal Party (PSL)	Flávia Francischini	4,540	0.57	(Note: Francischini is affiliated to the Brazil Union (UNIÃO) since April 2022 and resigned on her parliamentary term on 31 January 2023 to take office as a State Deputy at the Legislative Assembly of Paraná. The alternate that took office after her resignation is Rodrigo Reis, a member of Brazil Union (UNIÃO) who left the party in April 2024 to join the Liberal Party (PL).)
Republicanos	Pastor Marciano Alves	4,483	0.57	(Note: Alves was affiliated to Solidarity from April 2022 to April 2024, when he decided to return to his former party Republicans.)
Brazilian Democratic Movement (MDB)	Noemia Rocha	4,439	0.56	—N/a
Democratic Labour Party (PDT)	Dalton Borba	4,428	0.56	(Note: Borba was affiliated to the Democratic Labour Party (PDT) until April 2024, when he decided to leave and join Solidarity.)
Social Liberal Party (PSL)	João da Loja 5 Irmãos	4,423	0.56	(Note: João was affiliated to the Brazil Union (UNIÃO), a merger of Democrats (DEM) and the Social Liberal Party (PSL) from April 2022 to April 2024, when he decided to leave the party to join the Brazilian Democratic Movement (MDB).)
Social Liberal Party (PSL)	Sargento Tânia Guerreiro	4,422	0.56	(Note: Guerreiro was affiliated to the Brazil Union (UNIÃO), a merger of Democrats (DEM) and the Social Liberal Party (PSL) from April 2022 to April 2024, when she decided to leave the party to join Podemos (PODE).)
Solidarity	Alexandre Leprevost	4,385	0.55	(Note: Leprevost was affiliated to Solidariedade until April 2024, when he decided to leave the party to join the Brazil Union (UNIÃO).)
Progressistas (PP)	Oscalino do Povo	4,093	0.52	—N/a
Brazilian Woman's Party (PMB)	Ezequias Barros	4,091	0.52	(Note: Barros was affiliated to the Brazilian Woman's Party (PMB) until April 2024, when he left and decided to join the Democratic Renewal Party (PRD).)
Progressistas (PP)	Nori Seto	4,085	0.52	—N/a
Green Party (PV)	Maria Leticia	4,019	0.51	(Note: Leticia was suspended from the prerogatives of her position as councillor for six months by decision of the Municipal Chamber of Curitiba from 23 April 2024.)
Social Democratic Party (PSD)	Jornalista Márcio Barros	3,946	0.50	—N/a
Social Democratic Party (PSD)	Eder Borges	3,932	0.50	(Note: Borges was affiliated to Progressistas (PP) from April 2022 to April 2024, when he left the party and decided to join the Liberal Party (PL). He had his term revoked by the Regional Electoral Court of Paraná on 27 May 2022. The former councillor Mestre Pop (PSD) took office from 6 June to 23 June 2022, when Borges regained his mandate as councillor by a court decision of the Court of Justice of the State of Paraná (TJ-PR).)
Podemos (PODE)	Mauro Bobato	3,892	0.49	(Note: Bobato was affiliated to Podemos until April 2024, when he left the party and decided to join Progressistas (PP).)
Patriota	Sidnei Toaldo	3,618	0.46	(Note: Toaldo was a member of Patriota, however, his party merged with the Brazilian Labour Party (PTB) and he became a member of the Democratic Renewal Party (PRD) in January 2024.)
Brazilian Socialist Party (PSB)	Hernani	3,136	0.40	(Note: Hernani was affiliated to Brazilian Socialist Party (PSB) until April 2024, when he decided to leave and join Republicans.)
New Party (NOVO)	Amália Tortato	3,092	0.39	—N/a
Solidarity	Leonidas Dias	2,704	0.34	(Note: Dias was a member of Solidarity until April 2024, when he left party to join Podemos (PODE).)
Christian Democracy (DC)	Salles do Fazendinha	2,527	0.32	(Note: Salles was a member of Christian Democracy (DC) until April 2024, when he left the party to join Sustainability Network (REDE).)
