= Eduardo Pimentel (politician) =

Brazilian politician (born 1984)

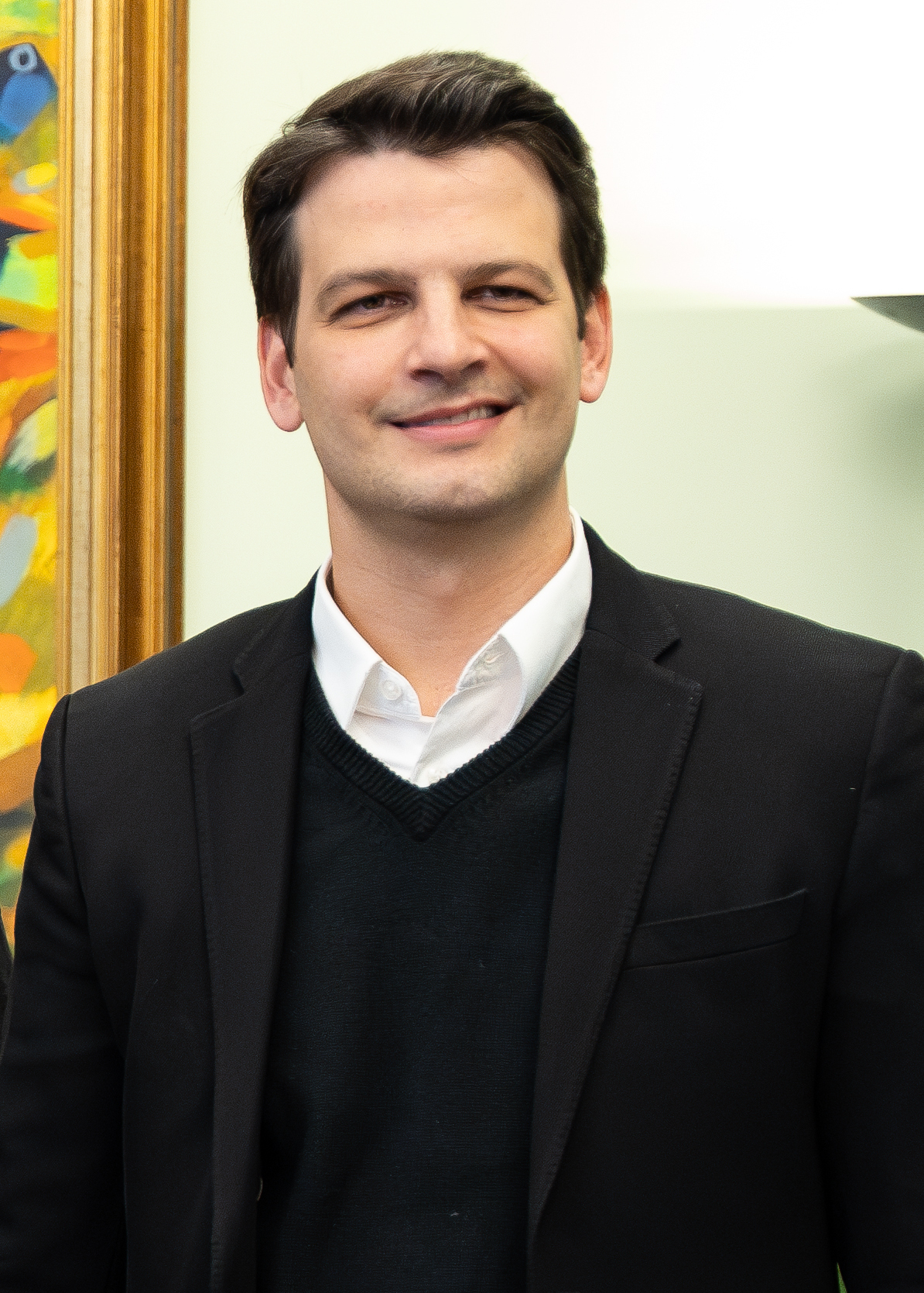
- Pimentel in 2024

Mayor of Curitiba
- Incumbent
- Assumed office 1 January 2025

Personal details
- Born: 21 September 1984 (age 42)
- Party: Social Democratic Party (since 2020)
- Relatives: Paulo Pimentel (grandfather)

Eduardo Pimentel Slaviero (born 21 September 1984) is a Brazilian politician serving as mayor of Curitiba since 2025. From 2017 to 2024, he served as deputy mayor. From 2023 to 2024, he served as secretary of cities of Paraná. He is the grandson of Paulo Pimentel.
