= Maria Victoria Barros =

Brazilian politician

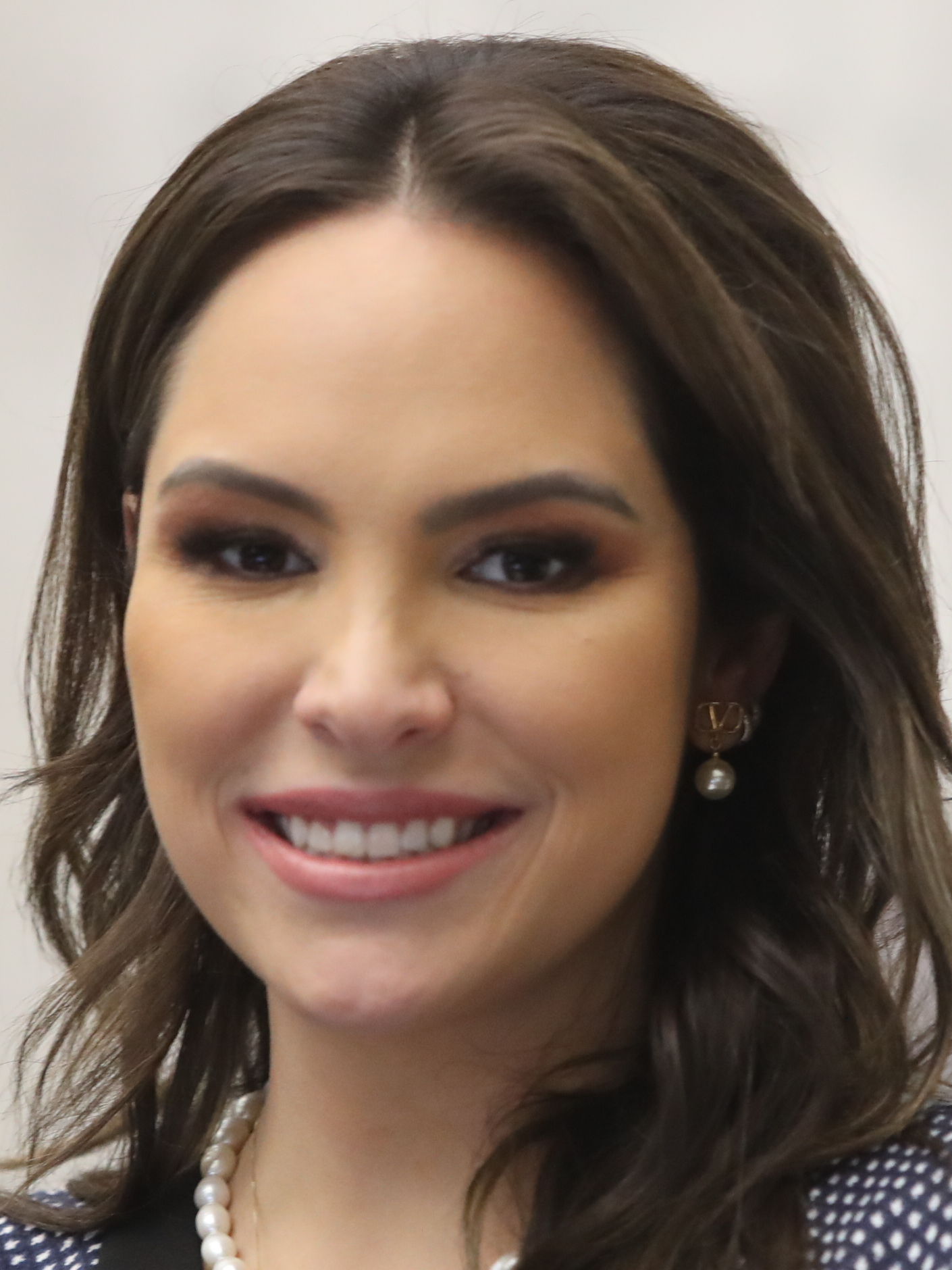
- Barros in 2023

State Deputy for Paraná
- Incumbent
- Assumed office 1 February 2015

Personal details
- Born: 1 February 1992 (age 34) Maringá, Brazil
- Party: PP

Maria Victoria Borghetti Barros (born 1 February 1992) is a Brazilian politician and businesswoman. She has spent her political career representing Paraná, having served as a representative in the state legislature since 2019.

== Personal life ==
Coming from a political family, Barros is the daughter of Ricardo Barros, a government minister, state deputy, and former mayor of Maringá, while her mother Cida Borghetti is the governor of Paraná. At her wedding in 2017, Barros had to be shielded from egg-throwing leftist protesters, who were disgruntled with Barros and her parents' strong support of the Impeachment of Dilma Rousseff.

== Political career ==
Barros was elected with about 44,870 votes to the Legislative Assembly of Paraná in 2014. She took office on her 23rd birthday. She was re-elected to her post in the 2018 elections.
