= Zeca Dirceu =

Brazilian politician (born 1978)

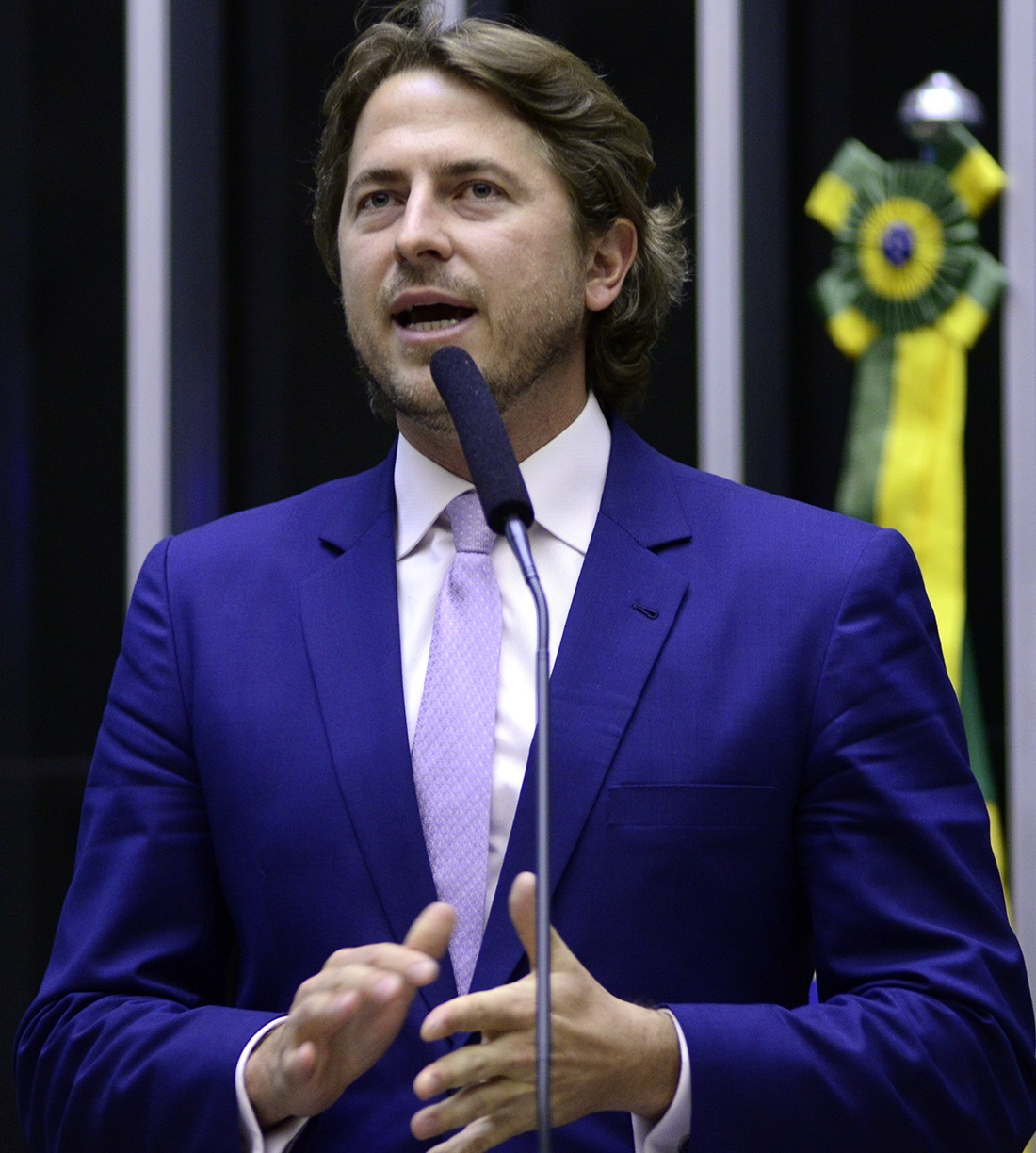
- Dirceu in 2015

Member of the Chamber of Deputies
- Incumbent
- Assumed office 1 February 2011
- Constituency: Paraná

Mayor of Cruzeiro do Oeste
- In office 1 January 2005 – 30 March 2010
- Preceded by: Yukio Tominaga
- Succeeded by: Valter Pereira da Rocha

Personal details
- Born: José Carlos Becker de Oliveira e Silva; 21 June 1978 (age 48) Umuarama, Paraná, Brazil
- Party: PT (since 1996)
- Parent: José Dirceu (father)

José Carlos Becker de Oliveira e Silva, better known as Zeca Dirceu (born 21 June 1978), is a Brazilian politician serving as a member of the Chamber of Deputies since 2011. From 2005 to 2010, he served as mayor of Cruzeiro do Oeste. He is the son of José Dirceu.
