= Carol Dartora =

Brazilian politician and historian (born 1983)

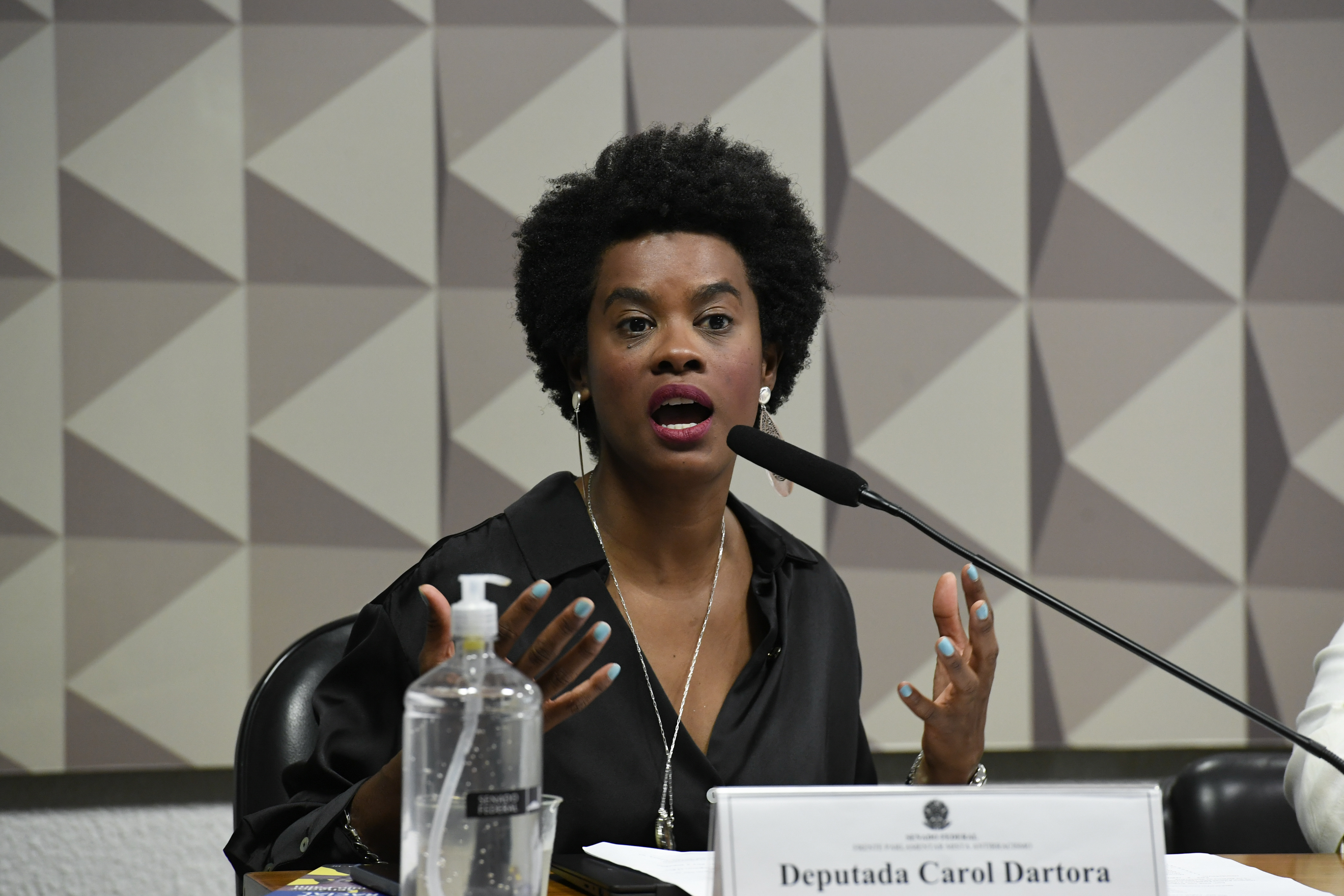
- Dartora on her first term as a Federal Deputy

Member of the Chamber of Deputies
- Incumbent
- Assumed office 1 February 2023
- Constituency: Paraná

Councillor of Curitiba
- In office 1 January 2021 – 31 January 2023
- Constituency: At-large

Personal details
- Born: Ana Carolina Moura Melo Dartora; 1 May 1983 (age 43) Curitiba, Paraná
- Party: PT
- Education: Universidade do Estado do Rio de Janeiro
- Profession: Professor
- Website: https://caroldartora.com.br

Ana Carolina Moura Melo Dartora, known as Carol Dartora (born 1 May 1983), is a Brazilian politician, teacher, historian, trade unionist and member of the Workers' Party (PT). She is currently a congresswoman for the state of Paraná, Brazil, having been elected at the 2022 Brazilian general election.

She made history becoming the first black woman elected as councilwoman of Curitiba, in 2020, and as congresswoman in Brazil, for the state of Paraná, in 2022.

== Public life ==
Dartora holds a degree in history from the Rio de Janeiro State University (UERJ), and she is also a specialist in Philosophy from the Federal University of São Carlos (UFSCar), a Master in Education from the Federal University of Paraná (UFPR) and a doctoral candidate in Technology and Society from the Federal University of Technology (UTFPR).

She is a militant of the World March of Women and the Black Movement. She was a Secretary of Working Women and LGBTI Rights of the Union of Workers in Public Education of Paraná (APP-Sindicato).

== Political career ==
Dartora was first elected in the 2020 Curitiba parliamentary election as a councillor of Curitiba with 8,874 votes, being the third most-voted councilwoman in the local election. She is the first black woman elected to the Municipal Chamber of Curitiba and was the leader of the opposition to Rafael Greca's government. She is the author of the law that establishes quotas for the black and indigenous peoples in the civil service entrance examination of the city, and she is also the author of a law that guarantees priority in the care of women in situations of violence.

Dartora ran as a candidate in the 2022 Paraná parliamentary elections and was elected to the Chamber of Deputies with 130,654 votes. She became the first black woman elected by Paraná to the lower house of the National Congress. In November 2022, as an elected congresswoman, Dartora was announced on the transition team of the second cabinet of president-elect Lula da Silva in the group of Social Development and Fight Against Hunger.

== Electoral history ==
=== Municipal Chamber of Curitiba ===
Election
Election	Party	Votes	%	Position in Curitiba Municipality	Result
2020	Workers' Party	8,874	1.12	No. 3	Elected

=== Chamber of Deputies ===
Election
Election	Party/alliance	Votes	%	Position in Paraná State	Result
2022	Workers' Party (Brazil of Hope)	130,874	2.13	No. 10	Elected

== See also ==
- 57th Legislature of the National Congress
