= Beto Richa =

Brazilian engineer and politician

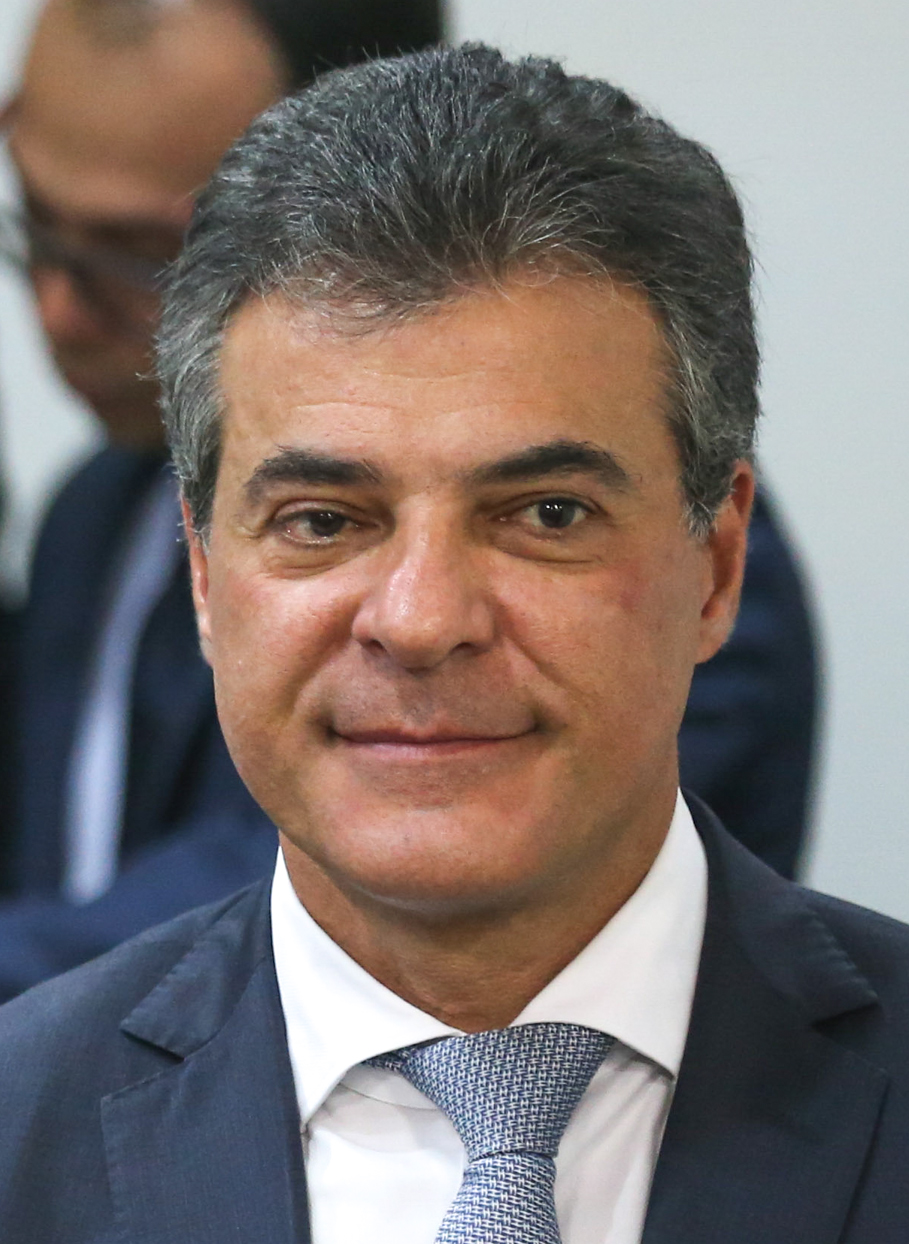

Member of the Chamber of Deputies
- Incumbent
- Assumed office 1 February 2023
- Constituency: Paraná

Governor of Paraná
- In office 1 January 2011 – 6 April 2018
- Lieutenant: Flávio Arns; Cida Borghetti
- Preceded by: Orlando Pessuti
- Succeeded by: Cida Borghetti

Mayor of Curitiba
- In office 1 January 2005 – 30 March 2010
- Deputy: Luciano Ducci
- Preceded by: Cássio Taniguchi
- Succeeded by: Luciano Ducci

Deputy Mayor of Curitiba
- In office 1 January 2001 – 1 January 2005
- Mayor: Cássio Taniguchi
- Preceded by: Algaci Tulio
- Succeeded by: Luciano Ducci

State Deputy of Paraná
- In office 1 February 1995 – 1 January 2001
- Constituency: At-large

Personal details
- Born: July 29, 1965 (age 61) Londrina, Paraná, Brazil
- Party: PSDB (2002–present; 1992–94)
- Other political affiliations: PTB (1994–2000); PFL (2000–02)
- Education: Pontifical Catholic University of Paraná (LL.B)
- Occupation: Civil engineer

Carlos Alberto "Beto" Richa (born June 29, 1965) is a Brazilian engineer and politician. He was the Governor of the Brazilian state of Paraná until April 6, 2018, when he resigned to run for a seat at the Brazilian Senate. He was succeeded by Cida Borghetti. His father was mayor of Londrina and governor of Paraná José Richa. On September 11, 2018, less than a month to the election, Richa was arrested as part of the Operation Car Wash.
