= Califórnia, Paraná =

Califórnia
- Municipality
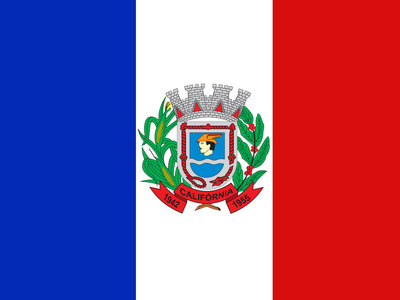
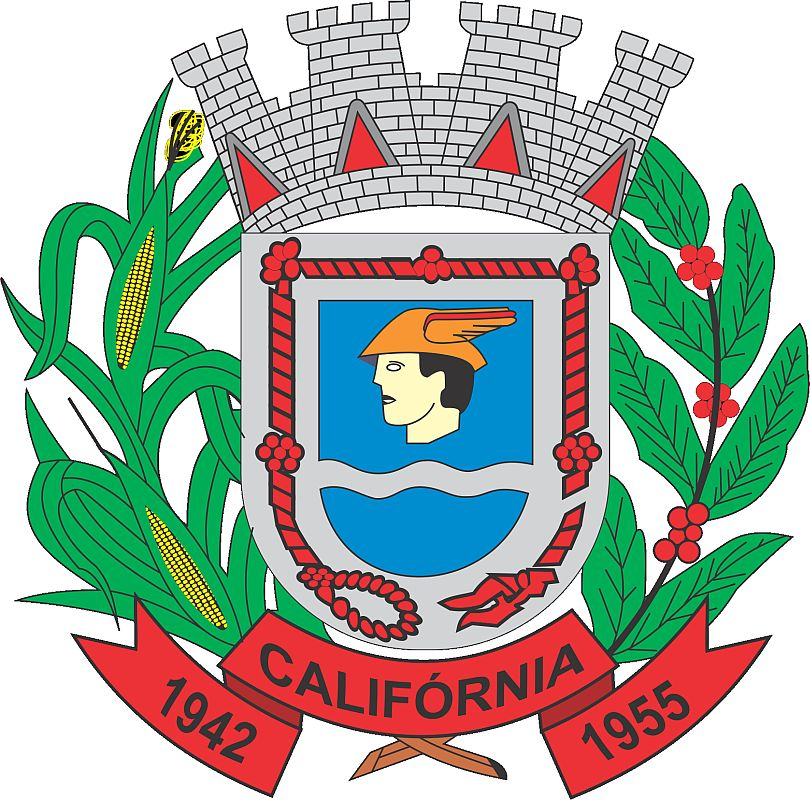
- Flag Coat of arms

- Location in Brazil
- Coordinates: 23°39′00″S 51°21′18″W
- Country: Brazil
- Region: Southern
- State: Paraná
- Mesoregion: Norte Central Paranaense

Population (2022)
  - Total: 8,710
- Time zone: UTC−3 (BRT)

Califórnia is a municipality in the state of Paraná in the Southern Region of Brazil.

== See also ==
- List of municipalities in Paraná
