= Ney Leprevost =

Brazilian politician (born 1973)

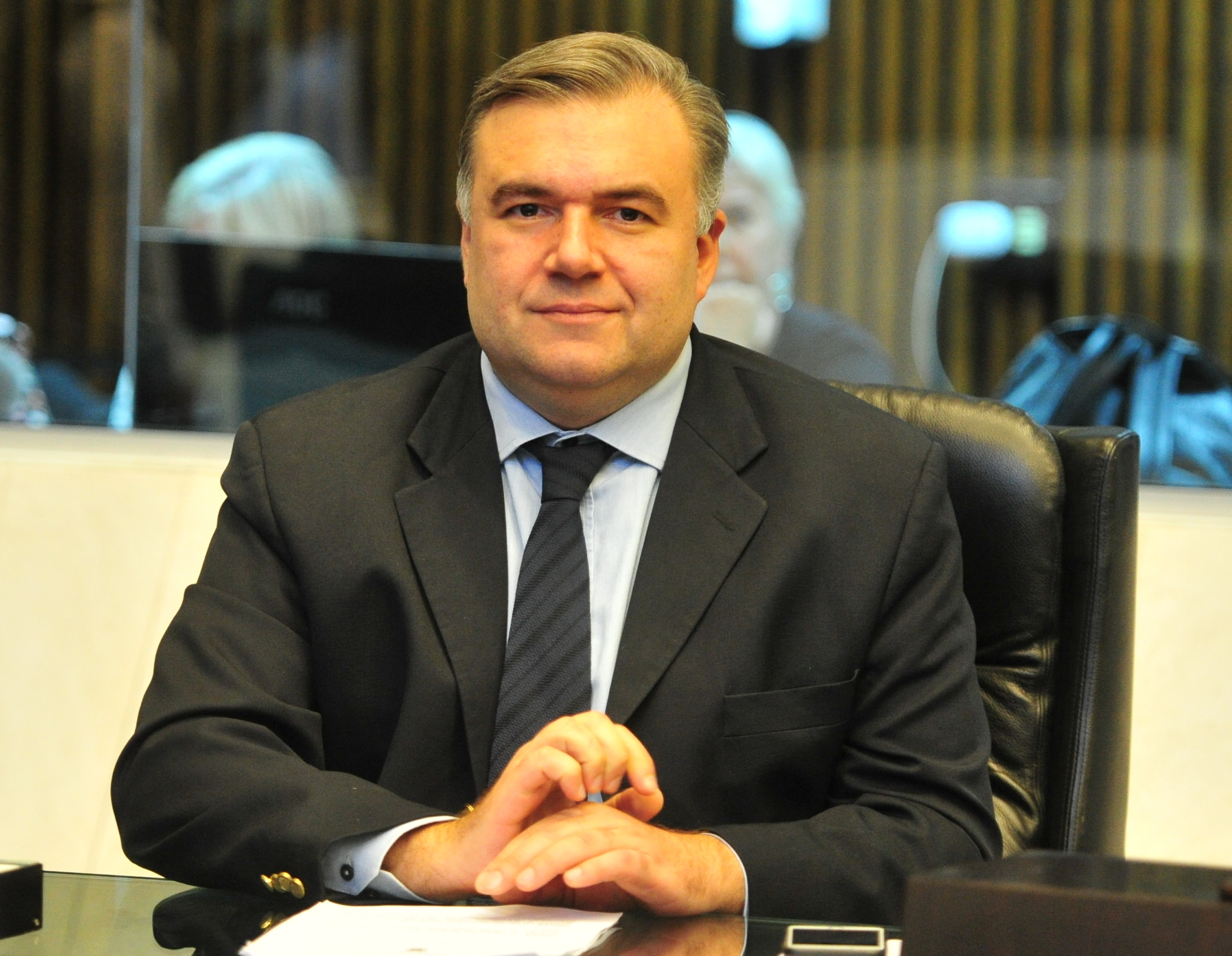
- Leprevost in 2023

Member of the Chamber of Deputies
- In office 1 February 2019 – 31 January 2023
- Constituency: Paraná

Personal details
- Born: 26 October 1973 (age 52)
- Party: Brazil Union (since 2022)

Ney Leprevost Neto (born 26 October 1973) is a Brazilian politician. He has been a member of the Legislative Assembly of Paraná since 2023, having previously served from 2007 to 2018. From 2019 to 2023, he was a member of the Chamber of Deputies.
