= Rosangela Moro =

Brazilian politician (born 1974)

- Moro in 2026

Member of the Chamber of Deputies
- Incumbent
- Assumed office 1 February 2023
- Constituency: São Paulo

First Lady-designate of Paraná
- Assuming office 6 January 2027
- Governor: Sergio Moro (elect)
- Succeeding: Luciana Saito

Personal details
- Born: Rosangela Maria Wolff de Quadros; 28 May 1974 (age 52) Curitiba, Paraná, Brazil
- Party: PL (since 2026)
- Other political affiliations: PODE (2022); UNIÃO (2022–2026)
- Spouse: Sergio Moro (m. 1999)

Rosangela Maria Wolff de Quadros Moro (née Wolff de Quadros, born 28 May 1974) is a Brazilian politician serving as a member of the Chamber of Deputies since 2023. She has been married to Sergio Moro since 1999.

Honorary titles
| Preceded by Luciana Saito | First Lady of Paraná; Taking role 2027 | Designate |
