= 2022 Paraná gubernatorial election =

Gubernatorial election in Brazil

2022 Paraná state election
- 2 October 2022 (first round)
- Opinion polls
- Turnout: 80.50%
- Gubernatorial election
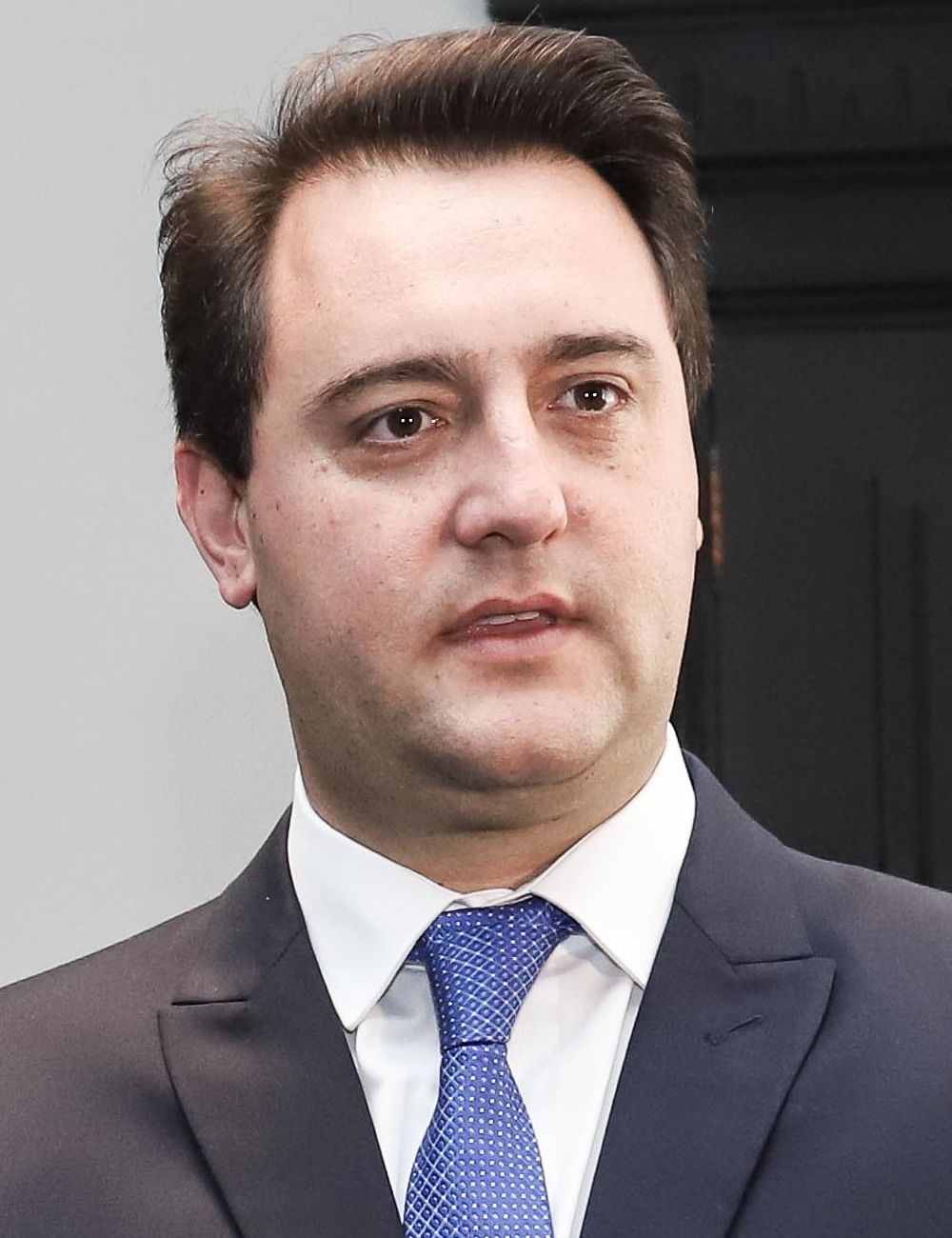

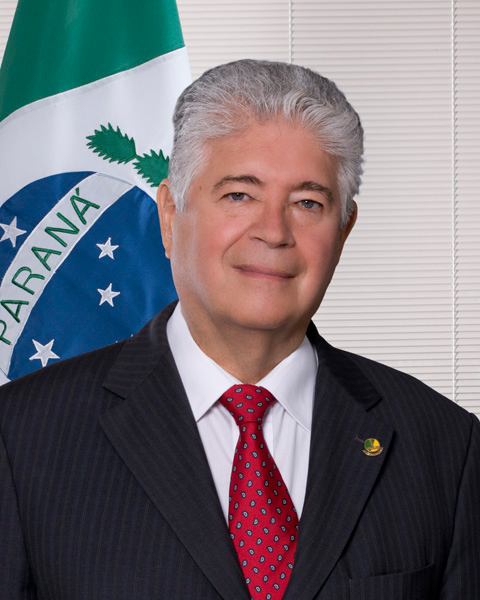
Candidate	Ratinho Júnior	Roberto Requião
Party	PSD	Workers' Party
Alliance	The change doesn't stop, Forward Paraná!	Brazil of Hope
Running mate	Darci Piana	Jorge Samek
Popular vote	4,243,292	1,598,204
Percentage	69.64%	26.23%
- Most voted candidate in each municipality (399): Ratinho Jr. (380) Requião (19)
Governor before election
Ratinho Júnior
PSD
Elected Governor
Ratinho Júnior
PSD
- Parliamentary election
- All 54 seats of the Legislative Assembly
Party	Vote %	Seats	+/–
PSD		15	+10
UNIÃO		8	+8
PP		6	+1
REP		5	−1
PL		5	+3
PT		5	+1
PSDB		3	−5
PROS		2	0
MDB		2	0
DC		1	−1
Cidadania		1	−2
PDT		1	−2
This lists parties that won seats. See the complete results below.
- Senatorial election
- 2 October 2022 (one-only round)
- Opinion polls
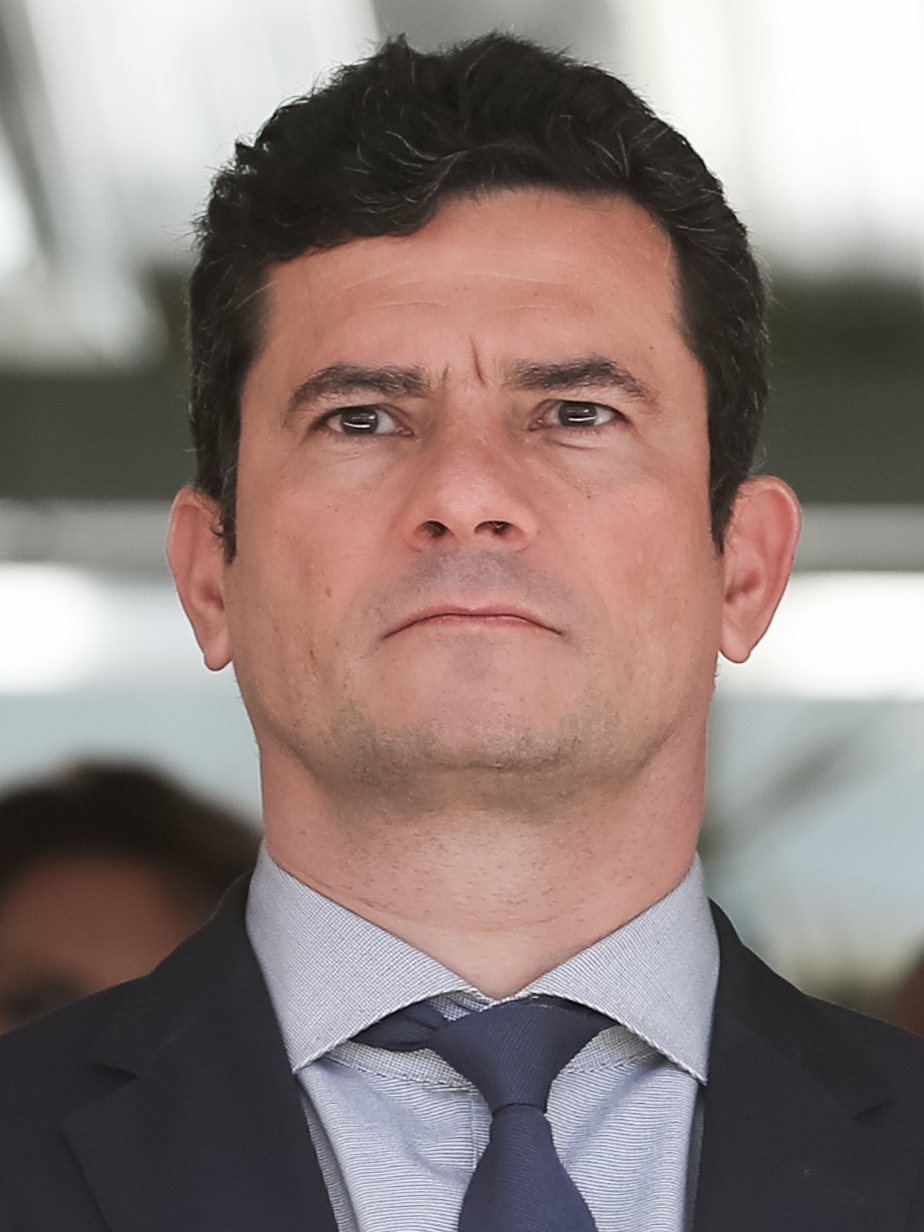

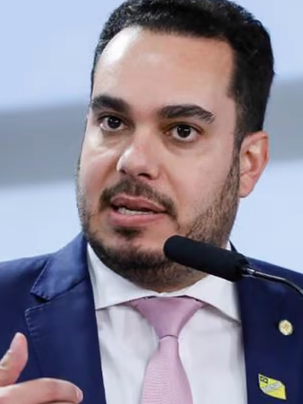

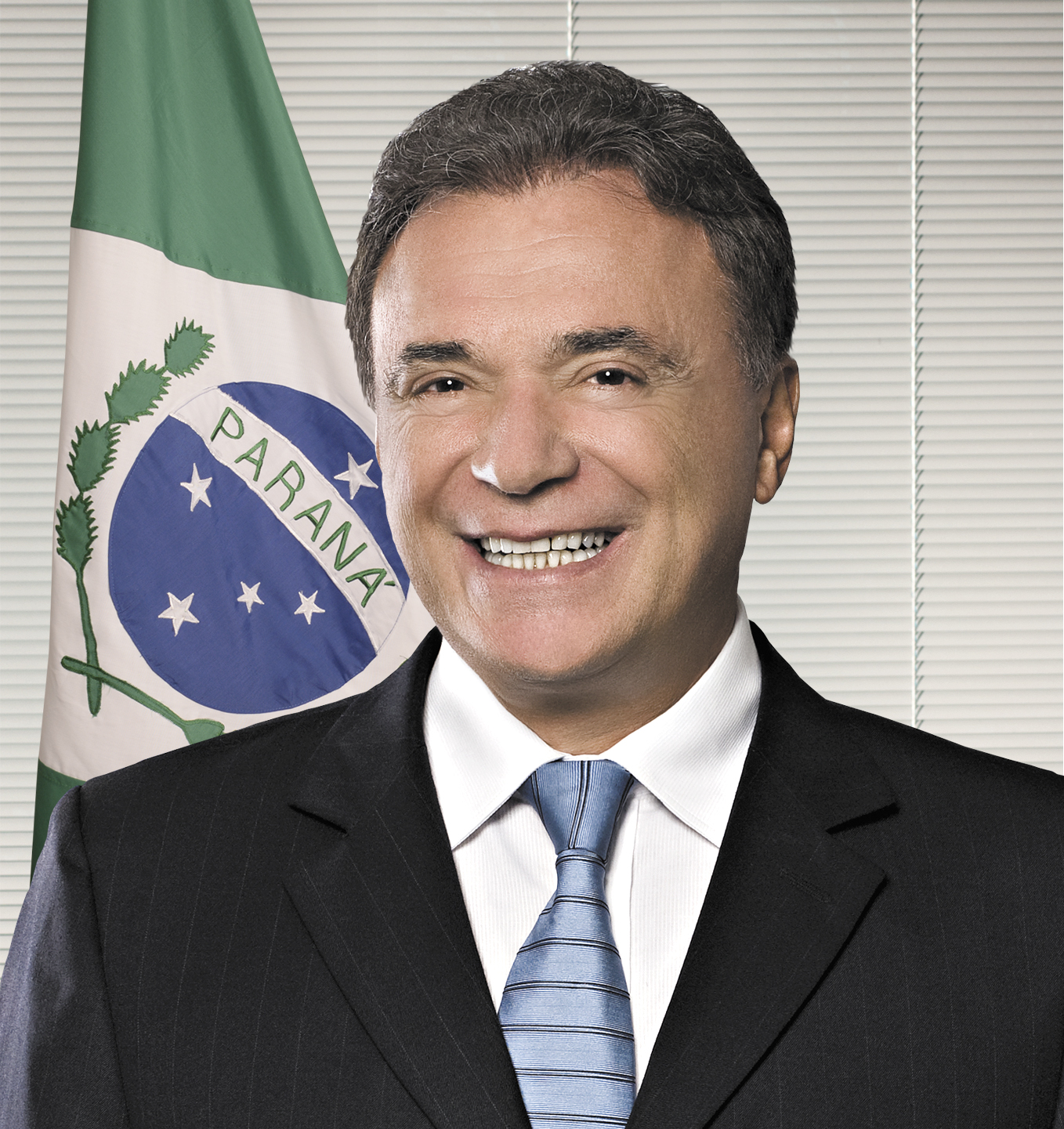
Candidate	Sergio Moro	Paulo Martins	Alvaro Dias
Party	Brazil Union	PL	PODE
Alliance			For the love of Paraná
Popular vote	1,953,188	1,697,962	1,396,089
Percentage	33.50%	29.12%	25.24%
- Most voted candidate in each municipality (399): Paulo Martins (148) Alvaro Dias (138) Sergio Moro (95) Aline Sleutjes (13) Rosane Ferreira (5)
Senator before election
Alvaro Dias
PODE
Elected Senator
Sergio Moro
Brazil Union

The 2022 Paraná state election took place in the state of Paraná, Brazil on 2 October 2022. Voters elected a Governor, Vice Governor, one Senator, 30 representatives for the Chamber of Deputies, and 54 Legislative Assembly members. The incumbent Governor, Ratinho Júnior, of the Social Democratic Party (PSD), was reelected in the first round with 69.64% of the votes.

For the election to the Federal Senate, the seat occupied by Alvaro Dias (PODE), who was elected in 2014 by the Brazilian Social Democracy Party (PSDB), was at dispute. He was able to run for reelection but was defeated by Sergio Moro, the former Minister of Justice and Public Security of Brazil.

Under the Constitution of Brazil, the governor will be elected for a four-year term starting 1 January 2023. Due to the approval of Constitutional Amendment No. 111, the term will end on 6 January 2027.

== Electoral calendar ==
Note: This section only presents the main dates of the 2022 electoral calendar, check the TSE official website (in Portuguese) and other official sources for detailed information.

Electoral calendar
May 15	Start of crowdfunding of candidates
July 20 to August 5	Party conventions for choosing candidates and coalitions
August 16 to September 30	Period of exhibition of free electoral propaganda on radio, television and on the internet related to the first round
October 2	First round of 2022 elections
October 7 to October 28	Period of exhibition of free electoral propaganda on radio, television and on the internet related to a possible second round
October 30	Possible second round of 2022 elections
until December 19	Delivery of electoral diplomas for those who were elected in the 2022 elections by the Brazilian Election Justice

== Gubernatorial candidates ==
The party conventions began on July 20 and will continue until August 5. The following political parties have already confirmed their candidacies. Political parties have until August 15, 2022, to formally register their candidates.

=== Confirmed candidates ===
Party	Candidate	Most recent political office or occupation	Party	Running mate	Most recent political office or occupation	Coalition	Electoral number	Ref.
Workers' Party (PT)	Roberto Requião	Senator for Paraná (2011–2019)	Workers' Party (PT)	Jorge Samek	Brazilian Director-General of Itaipu Dam (2003–2016)	Brazil of Hope Federation (PT, PCdoB and PV)	13	
Christian Democracy (DC)	Joni Correia	Teacher, entrepreneur and president of the Christian Democracy party in the state of Paraná.	Christian Democracy (DC)	Gledson Zawadzki	Businessperson	None.	27	
Workers' Cause Party (PCO)	Adriano Vieira	Unspecified.	Workers' Cause Party (PCO)	Cristiano Kusbic	Journalist.	None.	29	
United Socialist Workers' Party (PSTU)	Ivan Bernardo	Teacher.	United Socialist Workers' Party (PSTU)	Phill Natal	Journalist and biologist.	None.	16	
Socialism and Liberty Party (PSOL)	Angela Machado	Teacher.	Sustainability Network (REDE)	Sergio Nakatani	Lawyer.	PSOL REDE Federation (PSOL and REDE)	50	
Social Democratic Party (PSD)	Ratinho Júnior	Governor of Paraná (since 2019)	Social Democratic Party (PSD)	Darci Piana	Vice Governor of Paraná (since 2019)	Always forward; (PSDB and Cidadania); Progressistas (PP); Brazilian Democratic Movement (MDB); Solidariedade; Republican Party of the Social Order (PROS); Social Democratic Party (PSD); Republicans; Brazil Union (UNIÃO); Brazilian Labour Party (PTB); Liberal Party (PL)	55	
Democratic Labour Party (PDT)	Ricardo Gomyde	Councillor of Curitiba (2002–2003)	Democratic Labour Party (PDT)	Eliza Ferreira	Lawyer.	Democratic Labour Party (PDT)	12	
Party of National Mobilization (PMN)	Solange Bueno	Music teacher.	Party of National Mobilization (PMN)	Osni Minotto	Lawyer.	Party of National Mobilization (PMN)	33	
Brazilian Communist Party (PCB)	Vivi Motta	Psychologist and sociologist.	Brazilian Communist Party (PCB)	Diego Valdez	Educational agent in the state of Paraná.	None.	21	

=== Withdrawn candidates ===
- Zé Boni (AGIR) - Boni withdrew his candidacy for the state government to run for the Chamber of Deputies.
- Filipe Barros (PL) - Federal Deputy for Paraná (since 2019). His name was withdrawn by the party that decided to join Ratinho Júnior's coalition. For this reason, Filipe will run for re-election in the Chamber of Deputies.
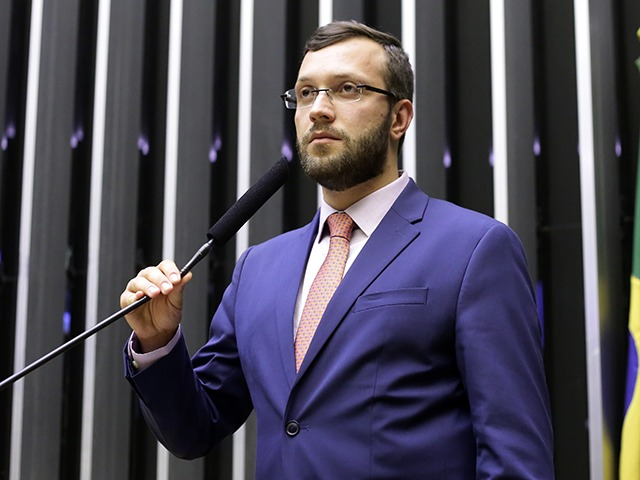
Federal Deputy for Paraná
Filipe Barros
(since 2019)

=== Rejected candidacies ===
- César Silvestri Filho (PSDB) - Mayor of Guarapuava (2013–2021). Silvestri's name was not approved at the PSDB Cidadania Federation convention that would define his candidacy for the Government of Paraná, and for this reason, the former mayor ended up having his candidacy withdrawn. The federation nominated him to run for the Federal Senate seat instead.
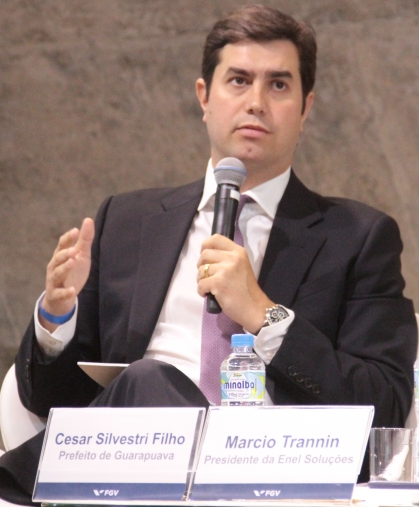
Mayor of Guarapuava
César Silvestri Filho (PSDB)
(2013–2021)

== Senatorial candidates ==
The party conventions began on July 20 and will continue until August 5. The following political parties have already confirmed their candidacies. Political parties have until August 15, 2022, to formally register their candidates.

=== Confirmed candidates ===
Party	Candidate	Most relevant political office or occupation	Party	Candidates for Alternate Senators	Coalition	Electoral number	Refs.
Brazil Union (UNIÃO)	Sergio Moro	Minister of Justice and Public Security (2019–2020)	Brazil Union (UNIÃO)	1st alternate senator: Luís Felipe Cunha	—N/a	444	
Brazil Union (UNIÃO)	Sergio Moro	Minister of Justice and Public Security (2019–2020)	Brazil Union (UNIÃO)	2nd alternate senator: Ricardo Guerra	—N/a	444	
Liberal Party (PL)	Paulo Martins	Federal Deputy from Paraná (since 2019)	Liberal Party (PL)	1st alternate senator: Franciane Micheletto	—N/a	222	
Liberal Party (PL)	Paulo Martins	Federal Deputy from Paraná (since 2019)	Liberal Party (PL)	2nd alternate senator: Juarez Bertê	—N/a	222	
Podemos (PODE)	Alvaro Dias	Senator for Paraná (since 1999)	Podemos (PODE)	1st alternate senator: Wilson Matos Filho	For the Love of Paraná: Podemos (PODE); Always forward (PSDB and Cidadania); Patriota; Social Christian Party (PSC); Brazilian Socialist Party (PSB)	190	
Podemos (PODE)	Alvaro Dias	Senator for Paraná (since 1999)	Podemos (PODE)	2nd alternate senator: Rolf Koerner	For the Love of Paraná: Podemos (PODE); Always forward (PSDB and Cidadania); Patriota; Social Christian Party (PSC); Brazilian Socialist Party (PSB)	190	
Republican Party of the Social Order (PROS)	Aline Sleutjes	Federal Deputy from Paraná (since 2019)	Republican Party of the Social Order (PROS)	1st alternate senator: Ademar Pereira	—N/a	900	
Republican Party of the Social Order (PROS)	Aline Sleutjes	Federal Deputy from Paraná (since 2019)	Republican Party of the Social Order (PROS)	2nd alternate senator: Fábio Amaral	—N/a	900	
Green Party (PV)	Rosane Ferreira	Federal Deputy from Paraná (2011–2015)	Communist Party of Brazil (PCdoB)	1st alternate senator: Elza Campos	Brazil of Hope Federation (PT, PCdoB and PV)	433	
Green Party (PV)	Rosane Ferreira	Federal Deputy from Paraná (2011–2015)	Workers' Party (PT)	2nd alternate senator: Professora Marlei	Brazil of Hope Federation (PT, PCdoB and PV)	433	

== Legislative Assembly ==
The result of the last state election and the current situation in the Legislative Assembly of Paraná is given below:

Affiliation	Members		+/–
Affiliation	Elected	Current	+/–
PSD	6	15	▲9
UNIÃO	New	8	▲8
PP	3	6	▲3
Republicanos	1	5	▲4
PL	2	5	▲3
PT	4	5	▲1
PSDB	3	3	Steady
PROS	2	2	Steady
MDB	2	2	Steady
DC	0	1	▲1
Cidadania	3	1	▼2
PDT	2	1	▼1
PRTB	1	0	▼1
PTB	1	0	▼1
PMN	1	0	▼1
PPL	1	0	▼1
PODE	1	0	▼1
PV	2	0	▼2
DEM	2	0	▼2
PSC	4	0	▼4
PSB	5	0	▼5
PSL	8	0	▼8
Total	54		–

== Opinion polls ==
=== First round ===
Political parties have until August 15, 2022, to formally register their candidates.

2021–2022

Pollster/client(s)	Date(s) conducted	Sample size	Ratinho Jr. PSD	Requião PT	Arns PODE	Machado PSOL	Zé Boni AGIR	Gomyde PDT	Others	Abst. Undec.	Lead
20 Jul 2022	César Silvestri Filho's candidacy for the government of Paraná is withdrawn by the Brazilian Social Democracy Party (PSDB) and the party decides to launch his candidacy to the Federal Senate.										
Pollster/client(s)	Date(s) conducted	Sample size	Ratinho Jr. PSD	Requião PT	Arns PODE	Silvestri Filho PSDB	Machado PSOL	Zé Boni AGIR	Others	Abst. Undec.	Lead
Real Time Big Data	19–20 Jul 2022	1.500	43%	16%	6%	2%	1%	0%	(Note: Solange Ferreira Bueno (PMN) with 0%)	32%	27%
Instituto IRG	29 Jun–3 Jul 2022	1.500	46.4%	19.6%	4.6%	2.9%	0.9%	0.7%	12.9% (Note: Sergio Moro (UNIÃO) with 12.9%)	12%	26.8%
Instituto IRG	29 Jun–3 Jul 2022	1.500	56.5%	23.5%	–	5.8%	–	–	–	14.3%	33%
Real Time Big Data	24–25 Jun 2022	1.500	42%	16%	5%	3%	1%	–	(Note: Solange Ferreira Bueno (PMN) with 0%)	33%	26%
Real Time Big Data	24–25 Jun 2022	1.500	44%	16%	–	4%	1%	–	(Note: Solange Ferreira Bueno (PMN) with 0%)	35%	28%
Paraná Pesquisas	12–16 Jun 2022	1.540	48.5%	25.2%	–	4.7%	2.7%	1.1%	–	17.8%	23.3%
Paraná Pesquisas	12–16 Jun 2022	1.540	49.5%	25.8%	–	6%	–	–	–	18.6%	23.7%
Instituto IRG	14–17 May 2022	1.500	52.8%	20.2%	7.2%	2.7%	1.7%	–	–	15.5%	32.6%
Instituto IRG	14–17 May 2022	1.500	55.3%	21%	–	3.2%	2.3%	–	–	18.2%	34.3%
Instituto IRG	31 Mar–3 Apr 2022	1.500	53%	21.5%	8.6%	2.9%	1.6%	–	–	12.4%	31.5%
Instituto IRG	31 Mar–3 Apr 2022	1.500	57.3%	23.7%	–	5.8%	–	–	–	13.2%	33.6%
18 Mar 2022	Requião decides to join the Workers' Party (PT).										
Pollster/client(s)	Date(s) conducted	Sample size	Ratinho Jr. PSD	Requião Indep.	Arns PODE	Silvestri Filho PSDB	Machado PSOL	Zé Boni AGIR	Others	Abst. Undec.	Lead
Radar Inteligência	25 Feb–3 Mar 2022	1.350	50.1%	19.8%	–	3%	–	–	–	27.1%	30.3%
Instituto Opinião	16–20 Dec 2021	1.152	53.3%	21.4%	8.9%	–	–	–	–	16.4%	31.9%
Instituto Opinião	16–20 Dec 2021	1.152	55.3%	23.3%	–	–	–	–	–	13.2%	32%

=== Second round ===
The second round (if necessary) is scheduled to take place on 30 October 2022.

Ratinho Jr vs. Requião

Pollster/client(s)	Date(s) conducted	Sample size	Ratinho Jr. PSD	Requião PT	Abst. Undec.	Lead
Instituto IRG	31 Mar–3 Apr 2022	1.500	61.6%	25%	13.3%	36.6%
18 Mar 2022	Requião decides to join the Workers' Party (PT).					
Pollster/client(s)	Date(s) conducted	Sample size	Ratinho Jr. PSD	Requião Indep.	Abst. Undec.	Lead
Radar Inteligência	25 Feb–3 Mar 2022	1.350	54.9%	22.2%	22.9%	32.7%

Ratinho Jr vs. César Silvestri Filho

Pollster/client(s)	Date(s) conducted	Sample size	Ratinho Jr. PSD	Silvestri Filho PSDB	Abst. Undec.	Lead
Instituto IRG	31 Mar–3 Apr 2022	1.500	66.4%	12.1%	21%	54.3%
Radar Inteligência	25 Feb–3 Mar 2022	1.350	60%	5.6%	34.4%	54.4%

=== Senator ===
2022

Pollster/client(s)	Date(s) conducted	Sample size	Moro UNIÃO	Alvaro PODE	Rosinha PT	Paulo PL	Guto PP	Silvestri Filho PSDB	Desiree PDT	Sleutjes PROS	Others	Abst. Undec.	Lead
20 Jul 2022	César Silvestri Filho's candidacy for the government of Paraná is withdrawn by the Brazilian Social Democracy Party (PSDB) and the party decides to launch his candidacy to the Federal Senate.												
Pollster/client(s)	Date(s) conducted	Sample size	Moro UNIÃO	Alvaro PODE	Rosinha PT	Paulo PL	Guto PP	Pessuti MDB	Desiree PDT	Sleutjes PROS	Others	Abst. Undec.	Lead
Real Time Big Data	19–20 Jul 2022	1.500	31%	26%	7%	5%	1%	–	1%	2%	1% (Note: Valdir Rossoni (PSDB) with 1%)	26%	5%
Instituto IRG	29 Jun–3 Jul 2022	1.500	22%	32%	6.3%	7%	3.1%	3%	0.2%	3.5%	2.3% (Note: Valdir Rossoni (PSDB) with 1.9% and Elton Barz (PCdoB) with 0.4%)	20.5%	10%
IPESPE	29 Jun–1 Jul 2022	1.000	24%	31%	10%	7%	–	–	–	5%	–	23%	7%
IPESPE	29 Jun–1 Jul 2022	1.000	–	45%	10%	8%	4%	–	–	5%	–	28%	35%
Real Time Big Data	24–25 Jun 2022	1.500	30%	23%	7%	6%	1%	–	–	2%	1% (Note: Alex Canziani (PSD) with 1%)	30%	7%
Real Time Big Data	24–25 Jun 2022	1.500	35%	–	7%	8%	2%	–	–	3%	4% (Note: Alex Canziani (PSD) with 4%)	41%	27%
Real Time Big Data	24–25 Jun 2022	1.500	41%	–	8%	8%	3%	–	–	3%	4% (Note: Alex Canziani (PSD) with 4%)	33%	33%
Instituto IRG	14–17 May 2022	1.500	–	45%	9.5%	7.1%	4.5%	4.3%	0.7%	2.7%	0.7% (Note: Elton Barz (PCdoB) with 0.7%)	25.5%	35.5%

== Results ==
=== Governor ===
Candidate	Running mate	Party	Votes	%
Ratinho Júnior (incumbent)	Darci Piana	PSD	4,243,292	69.76
Roberto Requião	Jorge Samek	PT	1,598,204	26.28
Ricardo Gomyde	Eliza Ferreira	PDT	126,945	2.09
Joni Correia	Gledson Zawadzki	DC	50,729	0.83
Angela Machado	Sergio Nakatani (REDE)	PSOL	43,176	0.71
Vivi Motta	Diego Valdez	PCB	13,577	0.22
Solange Ferreira	Marco Antonio Santos	PMN	10,337	
Ivan Bernardo	Phill Natal	PSTU	4,502	0.07
Adriano Teixeira	Cristiano Kusbick Poll	PCO	2,096	0.03
Total			6,082,521	100.00
Valid votes			6,082,521	89.38
Invalid votes			393,173	5.78
Blank votes			329,657	4.84
Total votes			6,805,351	100.00
Registered voters/turnout			8,480,435	80.25
PSD hold				

Popular vote
Ratinho	69.64%
Requião	26.23%
Others	4.11%

=== Senator ===
Candidate	Party	Votes	%
Sergio Moro	UNIÃO	1,953,188	33.50
Paulo Martins	PL	1,697,962	29.12
Alvaro Dias (incumbent)	PODE	1,396,089	23.94
Rosane Ferreira	PV	475,597	8.16
Desiree Salgado	PDT	130,520	2.24
Aline Sleutjes	PROS	89,560	1.54
Orlando Pessuti	MDB	63,784	1.09
Laerson Matias	PSOL	17,953	0.31
Roberto França	PCO	3,402	0.06
Carlos Saboia	PMN	2,521	0.04
Total		5,830,576	100.00
Valid votes		5,830,576	85.55
Invalid votes		506,442	7.43
Blank votes		478,670	7.02
Total votes		6,815,688	100.00
Registered voters/turnout		8,480,435	80.37
UNIÃO gain from PODE			

Popular vote
Moro	33.5%
Martins	29.12%
Dias	23.94%
Others	13.44%

=== Chamber of Deputies ===
Party or alliance		Votes	%	Seats	+/–
Social Democratic Party		1,051,984	17.42	7	▲3
FE Brasil	Workers' Party	862,421	14.28	5	▲2
FE Brasil	Green Party	102,663	1.70	1	Steady
FE Brasil	Communist Party of Brazil	8,268	0.14	0	Steady
Progressistas		704,175	11.66	4	▲2
Brazil Union		641,875	10.63	4	New
Liberal Party		593,160	9.82	3	Steady
Podemos		429,991	7.12	1	Steady
Republicanos		295,297	4.89	1	▼1
Brazilian Democratic Movement		273,684	4.53	1	▼1
Republican Party of the Social Order		214,036	3.54	1	▼1
Brazilian Socialist Party		183,490	3.04	1	▼1
Solidariedade		134,285	2.22	0	Steady
Democratic Labour Party		90,644	1.50	0	▼1
Always forward	Cidadania	89,330	1.48	0	▼1
Always forward	Brazilian Social Democracy Party	88,130	1.46	1	▲1
New Party		68,292	1.13	0	Steady
Brazilian Labour Party		47,433	0.79	0	▼1
Social Christian Party		33,081	0.55	0	▼1
Christian Democracy		31,099	0.52	0	Steady
PSOL REDE	Sustainability Network	26,240	0.43	0	Steady
PSOL REDE	Socialism and Liberty Party	16,601	0.27	0	Steady
Agir		14,141	0.23	0	Steady
Brazilian Woman's Party		13,324	0.22	0	Steady
Patriota		9,678	0.16	0	Steady
Brazilian Communist Party		6,280	0.10	0	Steady
Party of National Mobilization		5,108	0.08	0	Steady
Brazilian Labour Renewal Party		2,919	0.05	0	Steady
United Socialist Workers' Party		772	0.01	0	Steady
Workers' Cause Party		187	0.00	0	Steady
Total		6,038,588	100.00	30	–
Valid votes		6,038,642	88.60		
Invalid votes		331,101	4.86		
Blank votes		445,946	6.54		
Total votes		6,815,689	100.00		
Registered voters/turnout		8,480,435	80.37		
