= 2026 Paraná gubernatorial election =

- Gubernatorial election
- 4 October 2026 (first round)
- Opinion polls
- Registered: 8,600,624
- Turnout: 79.41% (▼1.09 pp)
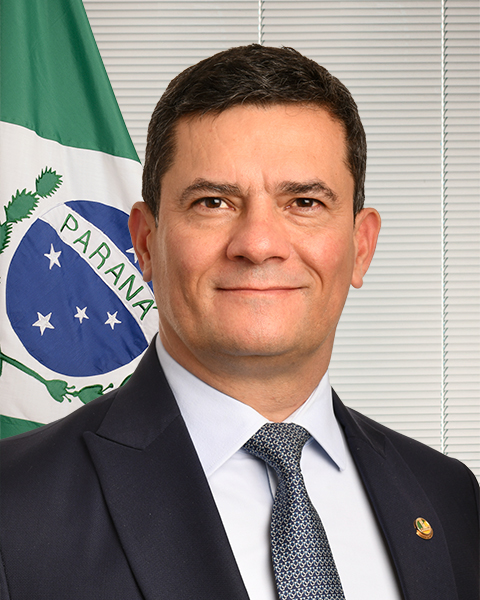

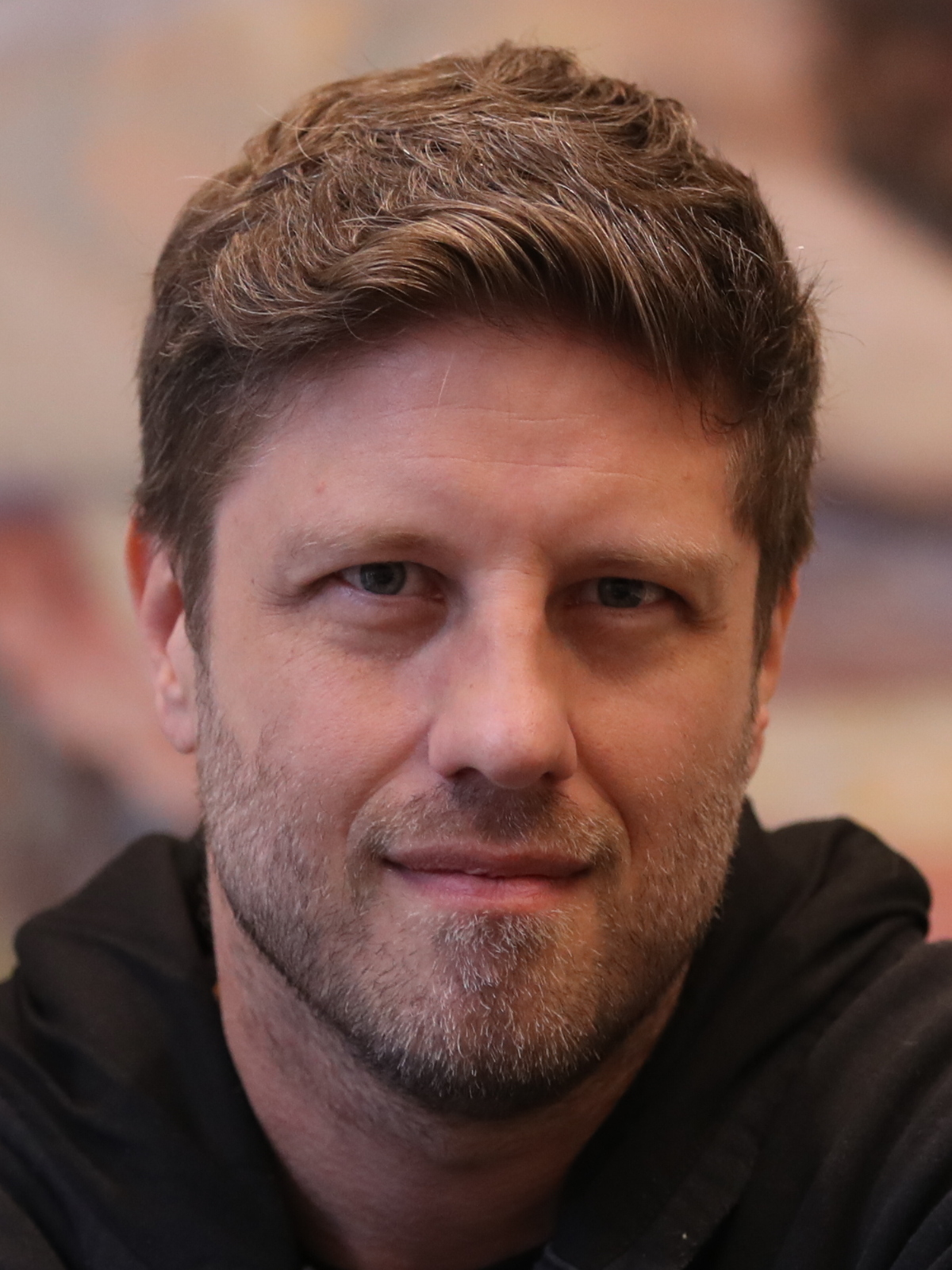
Candidate	Sergio Moro	Sandro Alex	Requião Filho
Party	PL	PSD	PDT
Alliance	Fortaleza do Paraná	A Mudança Continua	Paraná Para Todos
Running mate	Edson Vasconcelos	Rafael Greca (MDB)	Michele Caputo (Solidariedade)
Popular vote	3,127,911	1,583,764	1,465,601
Percentage	50.10%	25.37%	23.47%
Governor before election
Ratinho Júnior
PSD
Elected Governor
Sergio Moro
PL
- Senatorial election
- 4 October 2026 (one-only round)
- Opinion polls
- Registered: 8,600,624
- Turnout: 79.41% (▼1.09 pp)

Candidate	Filipe Barros	Deltan Dallagnol	Alexandre Curi
Party	PL	NOVO	Republicanos
Alliance	Fortaleza do Paraná	Fortaleza do Paraná	A Mudança Continua
Popular vote	3,148,583	2,904,594	1,947,135
Percentage	27.25%	25.14%	16.85%
Senators before election
Oriovisto Guimarães and Flávio Arns
PSDB and PSB
Elected Senators
Filipe Barros and Deltan Dallagnol
PL and NOVO

The 2026 Paraná general election was held in the state of Paraná, Brazil, on Sunday 4 October 2026. Voters elected a governor, vice governor, two senators, 30 representatives for the Chamber of Deputies, and 54 Legislative Assembly members.

Incumbent governor Ratinho Júnior of the Social Democratic Party (PSD), reelected in 2022 with 69.64% of the vote in the first round, is term-limited and ineligible to run for a third consecutive term. Incumbent senators Oriovisto Guimarães of the Brazilian Social Democracy Party (PSDB) and Flávio Arns of the Brazilian Socialist Party (PSB) are completing their eight-year terms and are eligible to run for reelection.

== Background ==
=== Electoral calendar ===
Note: This section only presents the main dates of the 2026 electoral calendar, check the TSE official website (in Portuguese) and other official sources for detailed information.

Electoral calendar
15 May	Start of crowdfunding of candidates
20 July to 5 August	Party conventions for choosing candidates and coalitions
16 August to 1 October	Period of exhibition of free electoral propaganda on radio, television and on the internet related to the first round
4 October	First round of 2026 elections
9 October to 23 October	Period of exhibition of free electoral propaganda on radio, television and on the internet related to a possible second round
25 October	Possible second round of 2026 elections
until 19 December	Delivery of electoral diplomas for those who were elected in the 2026 elections by the Brazilian Election Justice

=== Governor ===
Incumbent governor Ratinho Júnior of the Social Democratic Party (PSD) was reelected in the first round of the 2022 election with 69.64% of the vote, defeating former governor Roberto Requião of the Workers' Party (PT). Ratinho, the son of the popular television presenter Ratinho, secured the largest victory margin in the country by consolidating a massive coalition of center-right parties and maintaining high approval ratings. Because he is serving his second consecutive term, he is constitutionally barred from seeking a third period in executive office in 2026.

Ratinho governs alongside Vice Governor Darci Piana of the Social Democratic Party (PSD). A prominent businessman and former president of Fecomércio-PR, Piana was reelected on the 2022 ticket, maintaining the partnership that began in 2018. Ratinho is expected to resign in April 2026 to pursue a Senate or Presidential bid.

=== Senator ===
Senators in Brazil serve an 8-year term, meaning the incumbents were elected on tickets in 2018.

Oriovisto Guimarães, a billionaire businessman and founder of the Positivo Group, was elected to the Senate in 2018 as a member of Podemos (PODE). Focusing his mandate on fiscal responsibility and opposition to tax increases, he became a central figure in the economic debates in Brasília. In a major political move in early 2025, he switched to the Brazilian Social Democracy Party (PSDB) to lead the party's reconstruction in the state. He is eligible to run for a second term.

Flávio Arns, a professor and former vice governor of Paraná, holds the second Senate seat. He was elected in 2018 via the Sustainability Network (Rede), defeating former governor Beto Richa. Known for his advocacy for education and people with disabilities, Arns left Rede and joined Podemos before eventually settling in the Brazilian Socialist Party (PSB) in 2023 to align with the federal government's base while maintaining his independent profile. He is eligible to run for reelection in 2026.

== Gubernatorial candidates ==
No.	Governor			Vice Governor			Coalition Parties
No.	Candidate	Party Federation	Relevant offices	Candidate	Party Federation	Relevant offices	Coalition Parties
12	Requião Filho; Maurício Thadeu de Mello e Silva	PDT	State Deputy of Paraná (2015–2026).	Michele Caputo; Michele Caputo Neto	Solidariedade	State Deputy of Paraná (2019–2026).	Paraná Para Todos (PDT, Solidary Renewal Fed. (PRD and Solidariedade), FE Brasil (PT, PCdoB and PV), PSOL REDE Fed. (PSOL and REDE))
14	Luiz França; Luiz Felipe França	MISSÃO	No previous office	João Adolfo; João Adolfo Padilha Yamane Wendpap	MISSÃO	No previous office	No coalition
16	Samuel de Mattos; Samuel de Mattos Figueiredo	PSTU	No previous office	Helena Figueiredo; Helena Figueiredo da Costa Aleixo Lustosa	PSTU	No previous office	No coalition
22	Sergio Moro; Sergio Fernando Moro	PL	Federal Judge of the Regional Federal Court for the 4th Region (1996–2018); Minister of Justice and Public Security of Brazil (2019–2020); Senator for Paraná (2023–2026).	Edson Vasconcelos; Edson José de Vasconcelos	PL	President of the Federation of Industries of the State of Paraná (2023–2026).	Fortaleza do Paraná (PL, NOVO and PODE)
29	Adriano Funileiro; Adriano Teixeira	PCO	No previous office	Zé Carlos; José Carlos Telles	PCO	No previous office	No coalition
33	Alexandre Salomão; Alexandre Salomão	MOBILIZA	No previous office	Daiana Criminacio; Daiana da Silva Criminacio Oliveira	MOBILIZA	No previous office	No coalition
55	Sandro Alex; Sandro Alex Cruz de Oliveira	PSD	Federal Deputy for Paraná (2011–2026).	Rafael Greca; Rafael Valdomiro Greca de Macedo	MDB	Councillor of Curitiba (1983–1986); State Deputy of Paraná (1987–1992; 2003–2007); Mayor of Curitiba (1993–1996; 2017–2024); Federal Deputy for Paraná (1999–2003); Minister of Sports and Tourism of Brazil (1999–2000).	A Mudança Continua (PSD, MDB, UPB (UNIÃO and PP), PSDB Cidadania Fed. (PSDB and Cidadania) and Avante)
80	Tayná Miessa; Tayná Miessa Tsushida	UP	No previous office	Willian Araki; Willian Yukio Araki	UP	No previous office	No coalition

== Senatorial candidates ==
No.	Senator			Substitute members	Coalition Parties
No.	Candidate	Party Federation	Relevant offices	Substitute members	Coalition Parties
100	Alexandre Curi; Alexandre Maranhão Khury	Republicanos	Councillor of Curitiba (2001–2003); State Deputy of Paraná (2003–2026).	Dudo Potencial (Republicanos) Nelson Padovani (PP)	A Mudança Continua (PSD, MDB, UPB (UNIÃO and PP), PSDB Cidadania Fed. (PSDB and Cidadania) and Avante)
131	Gleisi Hoffmann; Gleisi Helena Hoffmann	PT; FE Brasil	Senator for Paraná (2011–2019); Chief of Staff of Brazil (2011–2014); Federal Deputy for Paraná (2019–2026); Secretary of Institutional Affairs (2025–2026).	Assis Gurgacz Neto (PDT) Prof. Aldair Rizzi (REDE)	Paraná Para Todos (PDT, Solidary Renewal Fed. (PRD and Solidariedade), FE Brasil (PT, PCdoB and PV), PSOL REDE Fed. (PSOL and REDE))
132	Dr. Rosinha; Florisvaldo Fier	PT; FE Brasil	Councillor of Curitiba (1989–1991); State Deputy of Paraná (1991–1999); Federal Deputy for Paraná (1999–2015).	Cris Wainer (PT) Tia Celina (PT)	Paraná Para Todos (PDT, Solidary Renewal Fed. (PRD and Solidariedade), FE Brasil (PT, PCdoB and PV), PSOL REDE Fed. (PSOL and REDE))
144	Karen Guerreiro; Karen Correia Guerreiro	MISSÃO	No previous office	Sonni Rezini (MISSÃO) Renato Scarante (MISSÃO)	No coalition
222	Filipe Barros	PL	Councillor of Londrina (2017–2019); Federal Deputy for Paraná (2019–2026).	Paulo Base (PL) Sergio Domingues (PL)	Fortaleza do Paraná (PL, NOVO and PODE)
290	Marcelo Marcelino; Marcelo Gonçalves Marcelino	PCO	No previous office	(PCO) (PCO)	No coalition
300	Deltan Dallagnol; Deltan Martinazzo Dallagnol	NOVO	Prosecutor of the Republic (2003–2021); Federal Deputy for Paraná (2023).	Wilson Picler (PL) Markenson Marques dos Santos (NOVO)	Fortaleza do Paraná (PL, NOVO and PODE)
555	Cristina Graeml; Cristina Reis Graeml	PSD	No previous office	(PSD) (PSD)	A Mudança Continua (PSD, MDB, UPB (UNIÃO and PP), PSDB Cidadania Fed. (PSDB and Cidadania) and Avante)
800	Joaquim do MLB; Joaquim Silva Maciel	UP	No previous office	(UP) (UP)	No coalition

== Results ==
=== Governor ===
Candidate	Running mate	Party	Votes	%
Sergio Moro	Edson Vasconcelos	Liberal Party	3,127,911	50.10
Sandro Alex	Rafael Greca (MDB)	Social Democratic Party	1,583,764	25.37
Requião Filho	Michele Caputo (Solidariedade)	Democratic Labour Party	1,465,601	23.47
Luiz França	João Adolfo	Mission Party	44,581	0.71
Tayná Miessa	Willian Araki	Popular Unity	14,193	0.23
Alexandre Salomão	Daiana Criminacio	National Mobilization	4,144	0.07
Samuel de Mattos	Helena Figueiredo	United Socialist Workers' Party	2,080	0.03
Adriano Teixeira	José Carlos Telles	Workers' Cause Party	1,525	0.02
Total			6,243,799	100.00
Valid votes			6,243,799	91.42
Invalid votes			307,494	4.50
Blank votes			278,322	4.08
Total votes			6,829,615	100.00
Registered voters/turnout			8,600,624	79.41
PL gain from PSD				

Popular vote
Moro	50.10%
Alex	25.37%
Requião	23.47%
Others	1.06%

=== Senator ===
Candidate	Party	Votes	%
Filipe Barros	PL	3,148,583	27.25
Deltan Dallagnol	NOVO	2,904,594	25.14
Alexandre Curi	Republicanos	1,947,135	16.85
Gleisi Hoffmann	PT	1,542,636	13.35
Florisvaldo Fier	PT	1,154,143	9.99
Cristina Graeml	PSD	737,893	6.39
Karen Guerreiro	MISSÃO	93,198	0.81
Joaquim Maciel	UP	15,457	0.13
Marcelo Marcelino	PCO	9,194	0.08
Total		11,552,833	100.00
Valid votes		11,552,833	84.58
Invalid votes		1,047,719	7.67
Blank votes		1,058,678	7.75
Total votes		13,659,230	100.00
Registered voters/turnout		8,600,624	79.41
PL gain from PSDB			
NOVO gain from PSB			

Popular vote
Barros	27.25%
Dallagnol	25.14%
Curi	16.85%
Hoffmann	13.35%
Others	17.40%

=== Chamber of Deputies ===
Party or alliance		Votes	%	Seats	+/–
New Party		941,131	15.14	4	▲4
Liberal Party		937,413	15.08	5	▲2
Brazil of Hope	Workers' Party	934,562	15.03	5	Steady
Brazil of Hope	Green Party	127,030	2.04	1	Steady
Brazil of Hope	Communist Party of Brazil	3,790	0.06	0	Steady
Social Democratic Party		724,134	11.65	4	▼3
Progressive Union	Progressistas	600,986	9.67	4	Steady
Progressive Union	Brazil Union	473,348	7.61	2	▼2
Republicanos		370,028	5.95	2	▲1
Podemos		344,967	5.55	2	▲1
Brazilian Democratic Movement		244,640	3.93	1	Steady
Democratic Labour Party		141,934	2.28	0	Steady
Brazilian Socialist Party		126,536	2.04	0	Steady
PSDB Cidadania	Brazilian Social Democracy Party	118,387	1.90	0	▼1
PSDB Cidadania	Cidadania	15,298	0.25	0	Steady
Mission Party		75,584	1.22	0	New
Solidary Renewal	Solidariedade	13,193	0.21	0	Steady
Solidary Renewal	Democratic Renewal Party	4,886	0.08	0	Steady
PSOL REDE	Socialism and Liberty Party	13,089	0.21	0	Steady
PSOL REDE	Sustainability Network	2,328	0.04	0	Steady
Popular Unity		2,417	0.04	0	Steady
Democrata		1,548	0.02	0	Steady
Workers' Cause Party		0	0.00	0	Steady
Total		6,217,229	100.00	30	–
Valid votes		6,217,229	91.03		
Invalid votes		220,223	3.22		
Blank votes		392,163	5.74		
Total votes		6,829,615	100.00		
Registered voters/turnout		8,600,624	79.41		

=== Legislative Assembly ===
Party or alliance		Votes	%	Seats	+/–
Liberal Party		1,443,270	23.35	14	▲9
Social Democratic Party		1,425,754	23.07	14	▼1
Brazil of Hope	Workers' Party	785,357	12.71	8	▲1
Brazil of Hope	Green Party	38,359	0.62	0	Steady
Brazil of Hope	Communist Party of Brazil	11,022	0.18	0	Steady
Progressive Union	Progressistas	516,420	8.36	6	▲1
Progressive Union	Brazil Union	105,512	1.71	0	▼7
New Party		407,190	6.59	3	▲3
Republicanos		351,856	5.69	3	Steady
Podemos		338,645	5.48	3	▲1
Brazilian Democratic Movement		268,503	4.34	2	Steady
Democratic Labour Party		143,046	2.31	1	Steady
Mission Party		94,569	1.53	0	New
Avante		85,377	1.38	0	Steady
PSOL REDE	Socialism and Liberty Party	75,111	1.22	0	Steady
PSOL REDE	Sustainability Network	9,535	0.15	0	Steady
PSDB Cidadania	Brazilian Social Democracy Party	44,466	0.72	0	▼2
PSDB Cidadania	Cidadania	4,407	0.07	0	▼1
Solidary Renewal	Solidariedade	13,403	0.22	0	▼1
Solidary Renewal	Democratic Renewal Party	3,926	0.06	0	Steady
National Mobilization		5,985	0.10	0	Steady
Democrata		5,072	0.08	0	Steady
Popular Unity		2,652	0.04	0	Steady
United Socialist Workers' Party		824	0.01	0	Steady
Workers' Cause Party		0	0.00	0	Steady
Total		6,180,261	100.00	54	–
Valid votes		6,180,261	90.49		
Invalid votes		212,108	3.11		
Blank votes		437,246	6.40		
Total votes		6,829,615	100.00		
Registered voters/turnout		8,600,624	79.41		
