= Filipe Barros =

Filipe Barros may refer to:

- Pipo (footballer, born 1992)
- Filipe Barros (politician)
