= Cafelândia =

Cafelândia may refer to:

- Cafelândia, Paraná, municipality in the State of Paraná, Brazil
- Cafelândia, São Paulo, municipality in the State of São Paulo, Brazil
