= Jhonatan Kauan =

Brazilian footballer

Personal information
- Full name: Jhonatan Kauan Eleoterio Diogo
- Date of birth: 23 August 2004 (age 22)
- Place of birth: Cafelândia, Brazil
- Height: 1.73 m (5 ft 8 in)
- Position: Forward

Team information
- Current team: Pouso Alegre

Youth career
- Internacional

Senior career*
Years	Team	Apps	(Gls)
2023–2024	Internacional	0	(0)
2025	Deportes La Serena	19	(1)
2026–	Pouso Alegre	0	(0)
- * Club domestic league appearances and goals as of 11 January 2026

Jhonatan Kauan Eleoterio Diogo (born 23 August 2004), known as Jhonatan Kauan, is a Brazilian footballer who plays as a forward for Pouso Alegre.

== Club career ==
Born in Cafelândia, Brazil, Kauan was trained at Inter de Porto Alegre, winning the 2022 Campeonato Gaúcho U20. He was included in the squad for the 2023 Copa Libertadores. At the end of the 2024 season, he didn't renew with Internacional.

In January 2025, Kauan moved to Chile and signed with Deportes La Serena in the Primera División on a deal for three years. He scored his first goal in the friendly against Unión Española on 18 January.

Back in Brazil, Kauan joined Pouso Alegre in January 2026.
