= Eduardo Rodrigo Fernandes Ribeiro =

Brazilian politician, biochemist, and businessman (born 1988)

Personal details
- Born: 11 October 1988 (age 38) Capinzal, Santa Catarina, Brazil

Eduardo Rodrigo Fernandes Ribeiro (born 11 October 1988) is a Brazilian politician, biochemist, and businessman. He is the current national president of the far-right New Party.

== Political career ==
Affiliated with the Partido Novo since its registration in 2015, Eduardo Ribeiro participated in building the party in the state of Santa Catarina, being elected its first president of the State Directorate in 2017. Under his leadership, the party participated in the 2018 elections, winning a seat in the Chamber of Deputies held by Gilson Marques.

In 2019, he was elected national secretary of the Partido Novo, a position he held until March 2020, when he assumed the party presidency following the resignation of then president João Amoêdo.

In April 2023, the party's National Convention reappointed Eduardo Ribeiro as president of NOVO for four additional years, with a term until 2027.
