= Deltan =

Deltan may refer to:

- Deltan Dallagnol, a Brazilian jurist and politician
- Deltans, as referring to people from Delta State, a subdivision of Nigeria
- Deltans, a fictional alien race in the Star Trek franchise
