= VivaTaiwan =

Social media campaign

#VivaTaiwan (lit. '[Long] live Taiwan') is an online campaign triggered by a letter to the members of the Brazilian Chamber of Deputies, sent by the Chinese embassy in the wake of Tsai Ing-wen's second inauguration as the president of Taiwan. The embassy asked the members to refrain from taking part in the ceremony or sending congratulatory messages. The letter was leaked on Twitter by Brazilian deputy Paulo Eduardo Martins, and sparked the Twitter trend and hashtag #VivaTaiwan.

== Letter ==
On 13 May 2020, the Chinese embassy in Brasília sent a letter to the members of the Chamber of Deputies, the lower house of the National Congress of Brazil. The letter termed Tsai Ing-wen as the "local leader" of Taiwan, and asked the Chamber of Deputies to "educate" its members on the Taiwan issue in accordance with Brazil's commitment to the One-China policy. It also asked the members to refrain from taking part in Tsai's swearing-in ceremony as the President of Taiwan after her victory in the 2020 elections, sending congratulatory messages to Taiwanese authorities or maintaining official contacts with them. The letter was leaked on Twitter on 26 May 2020 by Paulo Eduardo Martins, a Brazilian deputy from the Social Christian Party. The authenticity of the letter was confirmed by the Lusa News Agency. Martins termed it as an "affront", and sent a congratulatory message to Tsai. Taiwan's Ministry of Foreign Affairs (MOFA) replied to his tweet, saying that the Taiwanese government and people "sincerely appreciate the friendship and support of Brazil." MOFA spokesperson Joanne Ou thanked Martins for safeguarding democratic values, adding that democracy is a mutual value shared by both Taiwan and Brazil.

== Online campaign ==
Thank you to all of our friends in #Brazil for your kind congratulations, and I hope you are all staying safe & healthy. #VivaTaiwan #VivaBrazil

— Tsai Ing-wen

Martins's tweet triggered a Twitter trend, #VivaTaiwan ('Long Live Taiwan'), by Brazilian netizens. It became the top trend globally on 26 May 2020, and led to many tweets in support of the Taiwan independence movement. Martins's tweet was retweeted by Brazilian politician Eduardo Bolsonaro.

== Diplomatic significance ==
LSE IDEAS associate Charles Dunst said that the incident marks an end of the non-interventionist Chinese foreign policy. Indian author Sandipan Deb said that the response by Brazilian netizens was a "little samba setback" to the Chinese concept of tianxia.
