= 2014 Paraná gubernatorial election =

- October 5, 2014
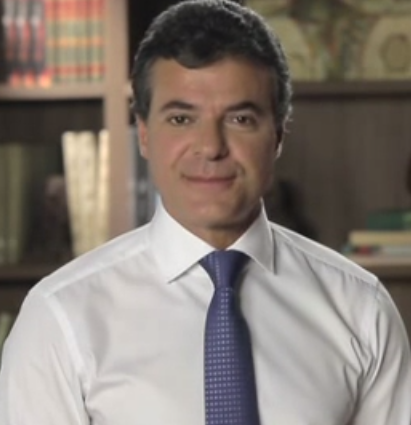

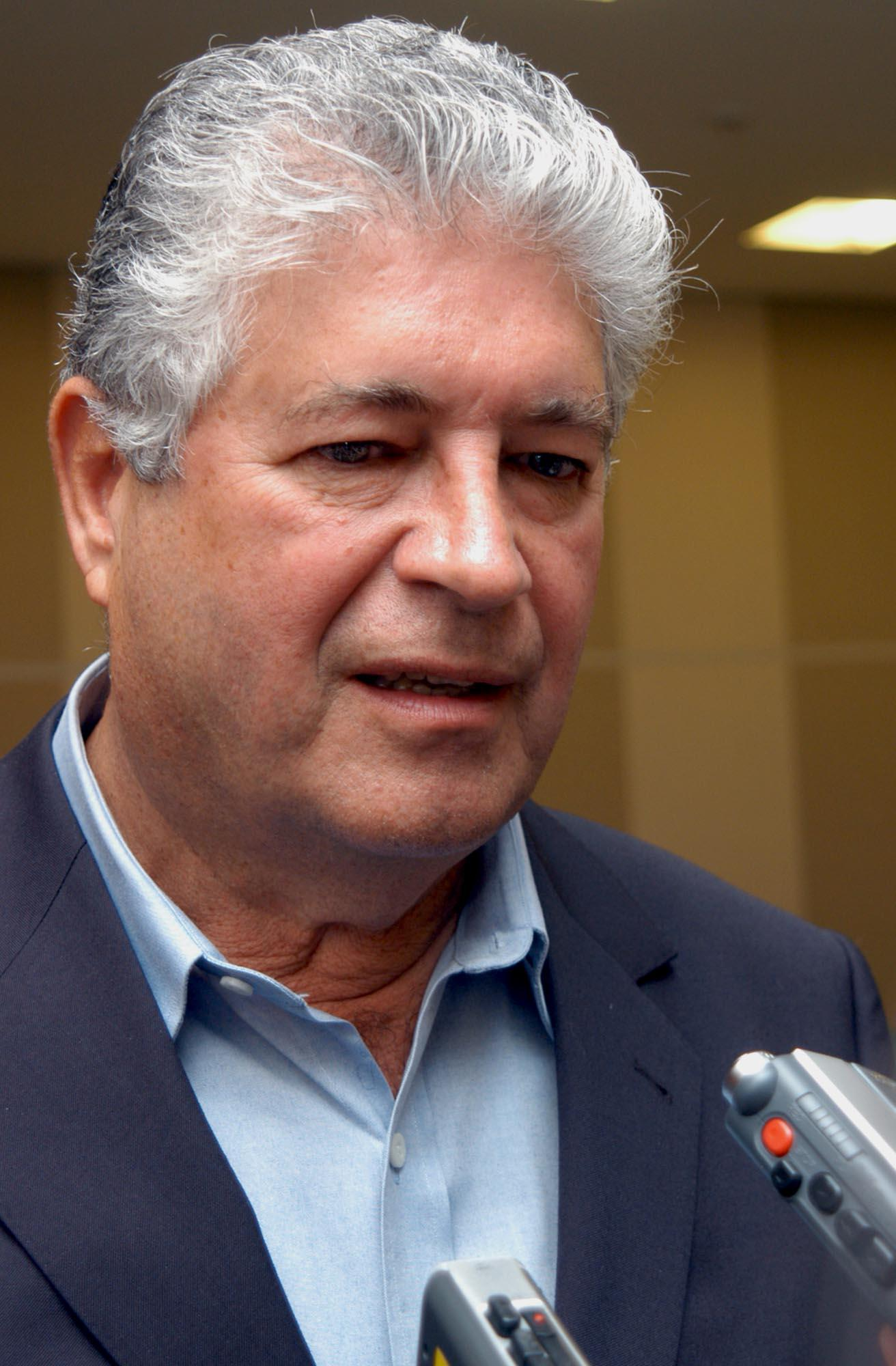

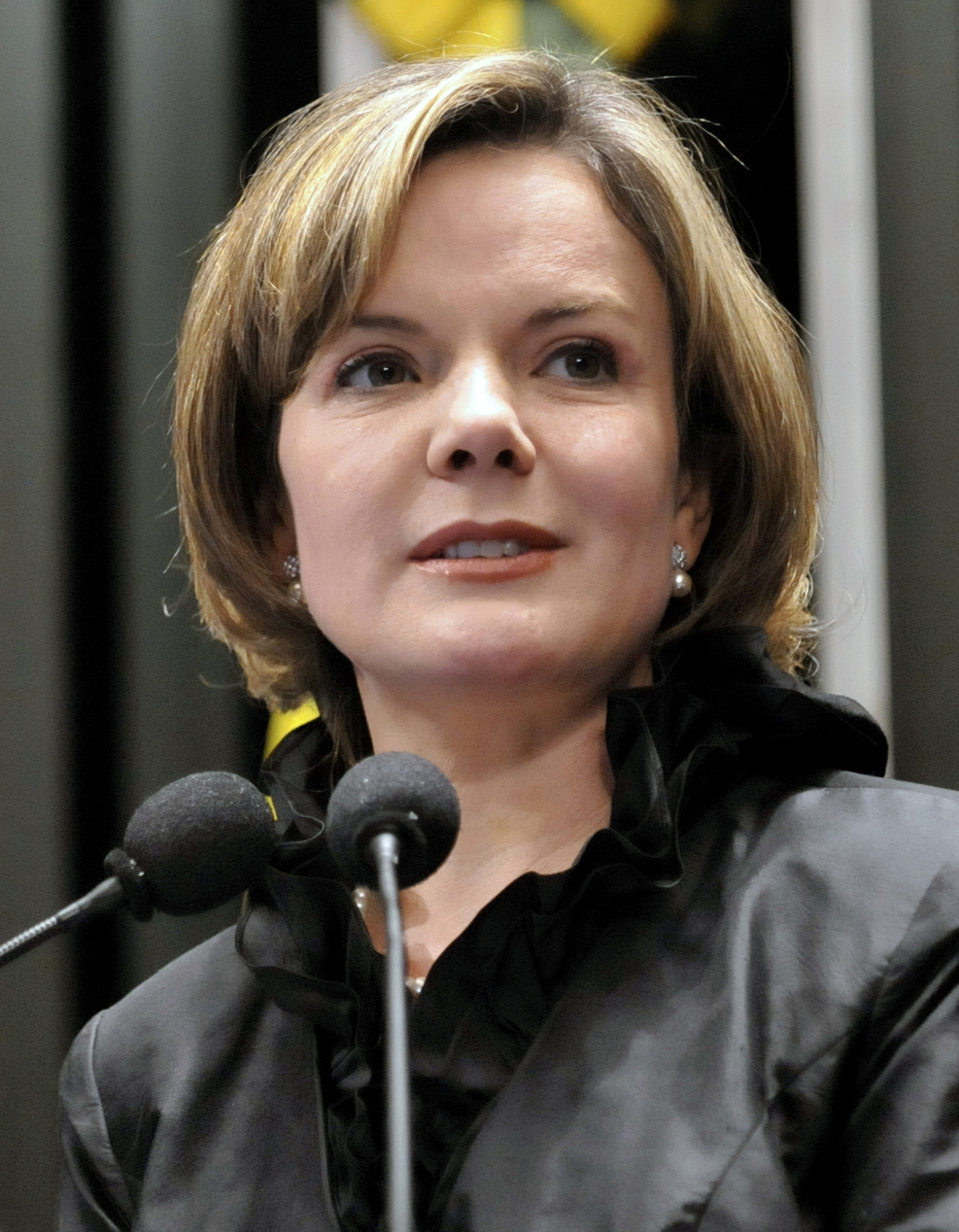
Nominee	Beto Richa	Roberto Requião	Gleisi Hoffmann
Party	PSDB	MDB	PT
Running mate	Cida Borghetti	Rosane Ferreira	Haroldo Ferreira
Popular vote	3,301,322	1,634,316	881,857
Percentage	55.67%	27.56%	14.87%
- Beto Richa (357) Roberto Requião (40) Gleisi Hoffmann (2)
Governor before election
Beto Richa
PSDB
Elected Governor
Beto Richa
PSDB

The Paraná gubernatorial election was held on 5 October 2014 to elect the next governor of the state of Paraná. Governor Beto Richa successfully ran for reelection, winning without the need for a runoff.

== Candidates ==
- Gleisi Hoffmann 13 (PT)
  - Haroldo Ferreira 13 (PDT)
- Roberto Requião 15 (PMDB)
  - Rosane Ferreira 15 (PV)
- Rodrigo Tomazini 16 (PSTU)
  - Érika Andreassy 16 (PSTU)
- Gionísio Marinho 28 (PRTB)
  - Rosângela Balduino 28 (PRTB)
- Tulio Bandeira 36 (PTC)
  - Ulisses Sabino 36 (PTC)
- Ogier Buchi 44 (PRP)
  - Elson Robas 44 (PRP)
- Beto Richa 45 (PSDB)
  - Cida Borghetti 45 (PROS)
- Bernardo Pilotto 50 (PSOL)
  - Maicon Palagano 50 (PSOL)

=== Coalitions ===
Candidate	Running mate	Coalition
Gleisi Hoffmann; PT	Haroldo Ferreira; PDT	"Paraná Olhando pra Frente" (PT, PDT, PCdoB, PTN, PRB)
Roberto Requião; PMDB	Rosane Ferreira; PV	"Paraná com Governo" (PMDB, PV, PPL)
Rodrigo Tomazini; PSTU	Érika Andreassy; PSTU	-
Gionísio Marinho; PRTB	Rosângela Balduino; PRTB	-
Tulio Bandeira; PTC	Ulisses Sabino; PTC	-
Ogier Buchi; PRP	Elson Robas; PRP	-
Beto Richa; PSDB	Cida Borghetti; PROS	"Todos pelo Paraná" (PSDB, PROS, DEM, PSB, PSD, PTB, PP, PPS, PSC, PR, SD, PSL, PSDC, PMN, PHS, PEN, PTdoB)
Bernardo Pilotto; PSOL	Maicon Palagano; PSOL	-

== Opinion Polling ==
Date	Institute	Candidate								Blank/Null/Undecided
Date	Institute	Beto Richa (PSDB)	Roberto Requião (PMDB)	Gleisi Hoffmann (PT)	Ogier Buchi (PRP)	Bernardo Pilotto (PSOL)	Rodrigo Tomazini (PSTU)	Túlio Bandeira (PTC)	Geonísio Marinho (PRTB)	Blank/Null/Undecided
September 26–28, 2014	Ibope	47%	28%	9%	1%	-	-	-	-	14%
September 25–26, 2014	Datafolha	45%	30%	10%	1%	-	-	-	-	15%
September 17–18, 2014	Datafolha	44%	30%	10%	1%	-	-	-	-	15%

== Results ==
Paraná Gubernatorial Election
Party	Candidate	Votes	%	±%
PSDB	Beto Richa (inc.)	3,301,322	55.67%	
MDB	Requião	1,634,316	27.56%	
PT	Gleisi Hoffmann	881,857	14.87%	
	Ogier Buchi	50,446	0.85%	
PSOL	Bernardo Pilotto	35,327	0.60%	
PTC	Tulio Bandeira	13,700	0.23%	
	Geonisio Marinho	7,303	0.12%	
PSTU	Rodrigo Tomazini	5,726	0.10%	
Majority		1,667,006	28.11%	
PSDB hold		Swing		
