= Luiz Felipe d'Avila =

Brazilian political scientist, coach (born 1963)

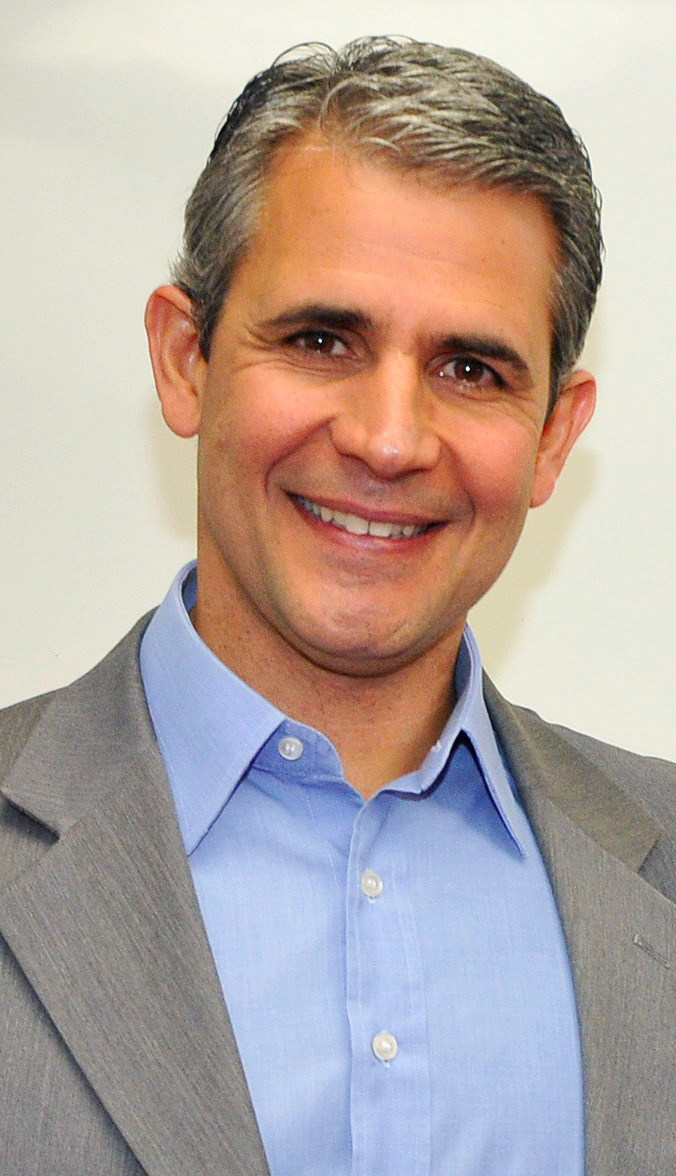
Luiz Felipe d'Avila

Luiz Felipe d'Avila, born August 24, 1963 in São Paulo, Brazil, is a Brazilian political scientist. He studied at the American University of Paris. He is currently a political commentator for Jovem Pan and a columnist for the newspaper Estadão.

He is a writer and professor, author of history and politics books. His works include : O Crepúsculo de uma Era, Dona Veridiana: A Trajetória de uma Dinastia Paulista, Os Virtuosos, Caráter e Liderança: Nove Estadistas que Construíram a Democracia Brasileira, Cosimo de Medici - Memórias de um Líder Renascentista e 10 Mandamentos: Do País que Somos para o Brasil que Queremos.

He was also the founder and editor of Editora D'Ávila, founded in 1996 and sold in 2002 to Editora Abril, which publishes the magazines Bravo! and República.

== 2022 Presidential Candidate ==
On October 29, 2021, the Partido Novo announced that Felipe d'Avila would be its candidate for the 2022 Brazilian presidential election.

On July 30, 2022, he officially launched his campaign with Federal Deputy of Minas Gerais Tiago Mitraud as his vice-presidential candidate.

On October 2, 2022, they were eliminated in the first round of voting, with their duo receiving only 0.47% of the vote. He called for a vote for Jair Bolsonaro in the second round.
