= Luísa Canziani =

Brazilian politician

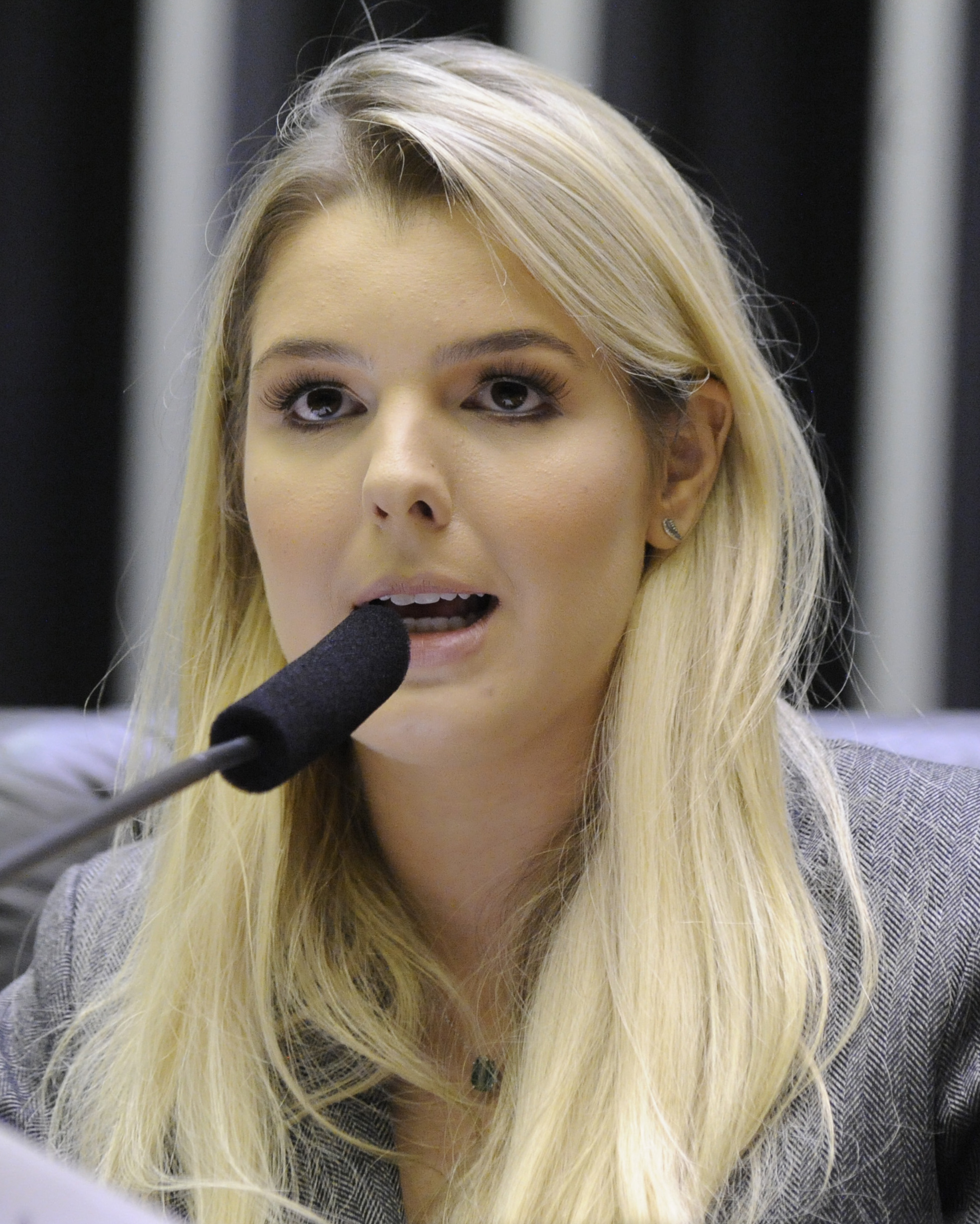
- Canziani in March 2019

Federal Deputy for Paraná
- Incumbent
- Assumed office 1 February 2019

Personal details
- Born: 11 April 1996 (age 30) Londrina, Brazil
- Party: PSD

Luísa Canziani dos Santos Silveira (born 11 April 1996) is a Brazilian politician and lawyer. She has spent her political career representing Paraná, having served in the state legislature since 2019.

== Personal life ==
Canziani is the daughter of politician and lawyer Alex Canziani. She is an alumna of the Pontifical Catholic University of Paraná.

== Political career ==
Canziani was elected to the lower legislature of Brazil in the 2018 Brazilian general election, succeeding her father who had served 5 consecutive terms from 1999 to 2019. Taking office at just 22 years of age, she is the youngest ever member of the federal chamber of deputies.
