= Heni Ozi Cukier =

Brazilian politician

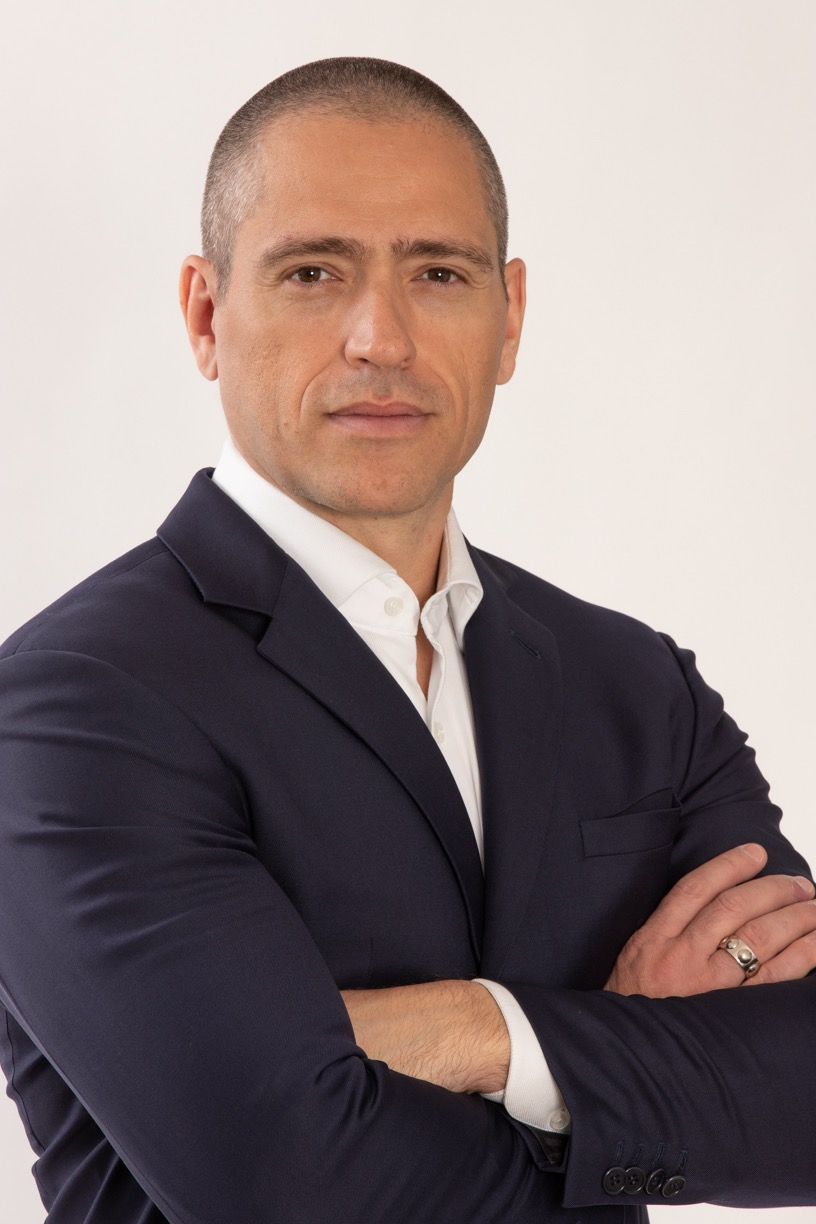

State Deputy of São Paulo
- In office 15 March 2019 – 15 March 2023
- Constituency: At-large

Personal details
- Born: 29 January 1977 (age 49) São Paulo, Brazil
- Party: PODE (2022–present)
- Other political affiliations: NOVO (2017–2022)
- Spouse: None
- Education: Barry University; American University
- Occupation: Political scientist, professor

Heni Ozi Cukier, also known as Professor HOC (born 29 January 1977 in São Paulo) is a Brazilian political scientist, professor, author, and public speaker. In 2018 he was elected state legislator to serve a four-year term at the State Legislative Assembly of São Paulo. Cukier currently serves as the director of the Postgraduate Program in Geopolitics (Global Dynamics) at the PUC Paraná University, and also teaches geopolitics on his YouTube channel, Professor HOC. From 2017 to 2018 he was Deputy Secretary of Urban Security of the city of São Paulo. He is also the founder of the international political risk analysis consultancy Insight Geopolítico.

== Early life and education ==
Heni Ozi Cukier was born and raised in São Paulo, Brazil. He is of Lebanese, Italian, Russian and Polish heritage through his grandparents. Cukier demonstrated a strong interest in global affairs and political science. He moved to the United States to pursue higher education, earning a dual degree in Philosophy and Political science from Barry University. He later obtained a master's degree in International Peace and Conflict Resolution from American University in Washington, D.C..

== Career ==
Cukier spent seven years living in the United States and worked for the United Nations at the Security Council in New York City, the Organization of American States, the Woodrow Wilson International Center for Scholars, and the Peacebuilding & Development Institute.

In 2008 Cukier returned to Brazil and founded a consultancy firm in international political risk. He also became a professor in the International Relations program at ESPM in São Paulo, where he taught for 12 years.

In 2016 he was the chief campaign strategist for the New Party in the municipal elections of São Paulo. In 2017, he became the Deputy Secretary for Urban Security at the City of São Paulo and led the City Cameras (CCTVs) public surveillance program, as well as efforts to tackle the open-air crack-cocaine scene known as Cracolândia.

In 2018 Cukier was elected state legislator to serve a four-year term at the State Legislative Assembly of São Paulo. In his first year he wrote the state's pension reform report and led its approval as floor leader. In 2019, he sponsored the law that established the first State Drug policy in the State of São Paulo. In 2021, he sponsored two other laws related to the COVID-19 pandemic: the "vaccine queue-jumping" law and penalties for those who committed corruption crimes during the pandemic. In July 2021, Cukier announced his intention to run for the Senate in the 2022 elections, but later redirected his campaign to run for Federal Deputy. He was not elected.

Cukier published his first book, Charisma Intelligence: Learn the Science of Influencing People, published by Editora Planeta in 2019, available at Amazon BR.

He also served as co-producer, researcher, and host of the documentary Cracolândia (Crackland), available on Apple TV and Google Play. Directed by Edu Felistoque, the film investigates the complexities of the open-air drug scene located in central São Paulo. The documentary received awards at international film festivals and was officially selected for the 44th São Paulo International Film Festival (Mostra Internacional de Cinema de São Paulo).

Cukier has a YouTube channel, @ProfessorHOC.

== Books ==
- Ozi Cukier, Heni (2019). Inteligência do Carisma. Planeta. ISBN 978-8-542-21712-4.
