= Luís Felipe Cunha =

Brazilian politician, lawyer (born 1979)

Senator for Paraná

Personal details
- Born: 18 January 1979 (age 47) São Paulo, Brazil
- Party: UNIÃO; PL

Luis Felipe Cunha (São Paulo, January 18, 1979) is a Brazilian lawyer and politician, affiliated with the Liberal Party. He is the first substitute of Sergio Moro, elected in the 2022 Brazilian general election, and will replace him in January 2027, after Moro was elected governor in the 2026 Paraná general election.
