= Paulo Eduardo Martins =

Brazilian politician and journalist

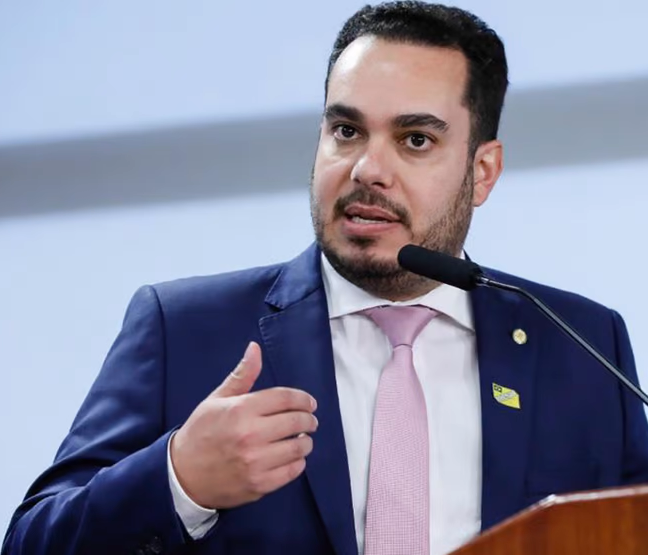
Federal Deputy from Paraná, Paulo Martins

Paulo Eduardo Lima Martins (born 20 April 1981) is a Brazilian politician, monarchist and journalist.

== Early life and career ==
Martins was born on 20 April 1981 in Presidente Venceslau. Prior to his political career, Martins was a journalist. He worked for the network Rede Massa, an affiliate of the Sistema Brasileiro de Televisão. In 2014, his program was taken off the air, as Martins's commentary became critical of Dilma Rousseff. The program was later reinstated.

== Political career ==
As a member of the Brazilian Social Democracy Party, he contested the 2014 Brazilian parliamentary election, receiving 63,970 votes. This vote share placed Martins fourth on a list of alternate deputies. Martins took office in the Chamber of Deputies on 17 April 2016, to replace legislators Valdir Rossoni and Edmar Arruda, as the candidates ahead of him, Osmar Bertoldi and Reinhold Stephanes, could not.

Martins returned to the Chamber of Deputies in 2018, winning election as a Social Christian Party candidate. He has supported the monarchy of Brazil reclaiming ownership of the Guanabara Palace. In May 2020, Martins posted to Twitter a letter from the Chinese embassy in Brazil addressed to Brazilian deputies, asking them not to acknowledge the second inauguration of Tsai Ing-wen, president of the Republic of China, more commonly known as Taiwan. Martins ignored the suggestion, tweeting "In this letter, the totalitarian Chinese government told the Brazilian Chamber of Deputies and its congresspeople to remain silent about Taiwan's presidential inauguration. This is an affront. Though I am late, I congratulate Tsai Ing-wen on her inauguration." Subsequently #VivaTaiwan trended on Twitter, with responses from other Brazilians, Tsai Ing-wen, and Taiwan's Ministry of Foreign Affairs.

== Partido Novo (New Party) ==
In 2025 he filiated with the Partido Novo.
