= Aline Sleutjes =

Brazilian politician

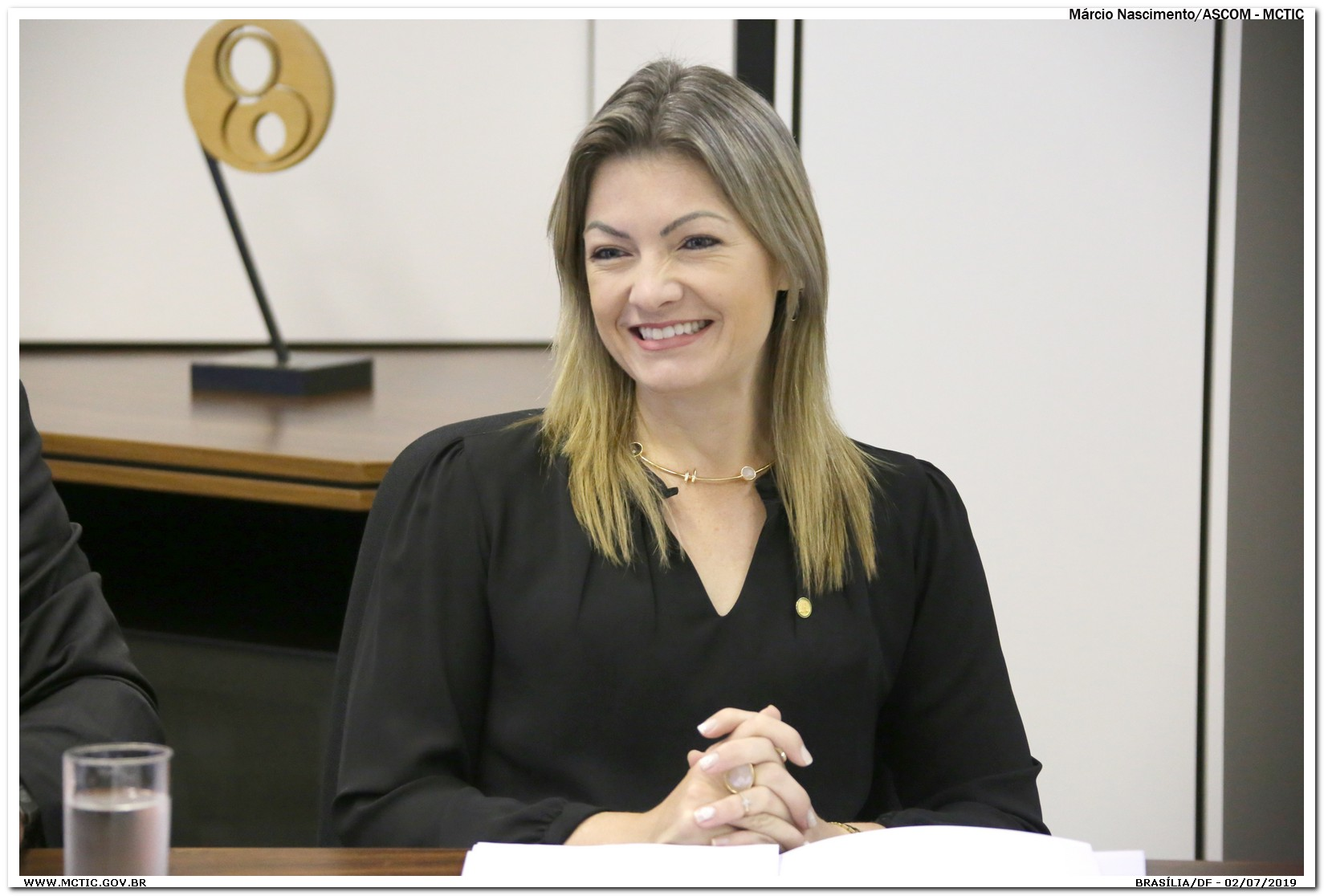

Federal Deputy for Paraná
- Incumbent
- Assumed office February 1, 2019

City Councillor of Castro
- In office January 1, 2013 – January 1, 2017
- In office January 1, 2005 – January 1, 2009

Personal details
- Born: July 26, 1979 (age 47) Castro, Paraná, Brazil
- Party: PROS (2022–present)
- Other political affiliations: PSDB (1998–2008); DEM (2008–12); PSDC (2012–16); PR (2016–18); PSL (2018–22); UNIÃO (2022)
- Occupation: Administrative Assistant and teacher

Aline Sleutjes (July 26, 1979) is an administrative assistant, physical education professional, teacher and Brazilian politician affiliated with the Republican Party of the Social Order (PROS). She currently serves as a federal deputy.

== Personal and professional life ==
A descendant of Dutch (Dutch) who immigrated to Brazil, his paternal grandparents, Maria Anna van der Heijden and Adrianus Martinus Sleutjes, were born in the Netherlands and together with their children left the country in 1949. Together with other Dutch families, they settled in the colony of Holambra, in the region of Campinas, in São Paulo. In 1953 the Sleutjes family took up residence in the Campos Gerais region, in the municipality of Castro, in Paraná, devoting themselves to agriculture and livestock. Daughter of Albertus Maria Sleutjes and Lilia Krelling Sleutjes, Aline was born in the city of Castro in 1979.

A resident of one of the largest dairy basins in the country, at the age of eight she was already helping with the family vocation, helping her father, who is Dutch, to deliver milk in the neighborhood. From 14 to 15 years old she was secretary of an academy, being her first de facto job and already in high school she was president of the student union.

In 1997 Aline graduated in physical education from the UEPG. In 2012, Sleutjes completed her postgraduate studies in School Management at Centro Universitário Barão de Mauá, in Ribeirão Preto, São Paulo.

In the professional field, Sleutjes was coordinator of the Department of Sport and Leisure, in the Municipality of Castro, from 2000 to 2004; she was also coordinator and director of Escola Nova Geração, from 2009 to 2012, and director of Colégio Sepam, from 2016 to 2017, both in the city of Castro; and also parliamentary advisor, being chief of staff to state deputy Ricardo Arruda (PSL), at the Legislative Assembly of Paraná, in 2017.

Sleutjes is married and has three children. She is Roman Catholic.

== Political career ==
In 1998 Aline Sleutjes joined the PSDB and began her political trajectory in the 2000 municipal elections when she ran for Castro in summer, but was unsuccessful. She was elected councilor in the 2004 municipal elections, still by the PSDB.

For the 2008 elections, she joined the DEM), running for vice-mayor and having the businesswoman and farmer, Maria Helena de Albuquerque, former councilwoman and also the DEM, as a candidate for mayor. However, that plate was defeated, and Moacyr Elias Fadel Junior, from the PMDB), was elected mayor.

In the 2012 municipal elections, Sleutjes was voted the most voted councilor, with 1,298 votes then by the PSDC. She was also a candidate for state deputy for the PSDC in the 2014 state elections and ended up not being elected, although she was the most voted of the party and the coalition, obtaining 19,059 votes. In the 2016 municipal elections, she ran for mayor for the PR, with the vice presidential candidate Régis Moreno, of the Republicans. The ticket, which received support from PV, PSDC, PEN and PT, was in third place, with 9,271 votes, and Moacyr Elias Fadel Junior (PMDB), was then elected again.

In 2020, after the Attorney General of the Republic Augusto Aras, asked for the investigation to be opened after acts carried out on April 19 across the country, the Supreme Federal Court launched an investigation to investigate the organization of acts against democracy. Aline is one of ten federal deputies who had breached bank secrecy as a measure taken to identify funders of anti-democratic demonstrations that called for the closure of Congress, the Supreme Court and the reissue of AI-5.

== Chamber of Deputies ==
In the 2018 elections, Sleutjes was elected federal deputy for Paraná, reaching 33,628 votes (0.59% of those valid), in the PSL / PTC / PATRI coalition, being the only woman elected by her party in the state and by the coalition. Defending a conservative agenda, she took office on February 1, 2019. On May 28, she took over as vice president of PSL Mulher, with Senator Soraya Thronicke of Mato Grosso do Sul as president.

As a parliamentarian she was the author of the request that asks the Ministry of the Environment the possibility of revising the decree of the federal government of March 23, 2006, which establishes the creation of the Campos Gerais National Park, being able to extinguish it as a conservation unit, being therefore, the initiative supported by the ruralist wing and partially repudiated by the academic and environmentalist wing.
