= João Amoêdo =

Brazilian banker, engineer, politician, and businessman

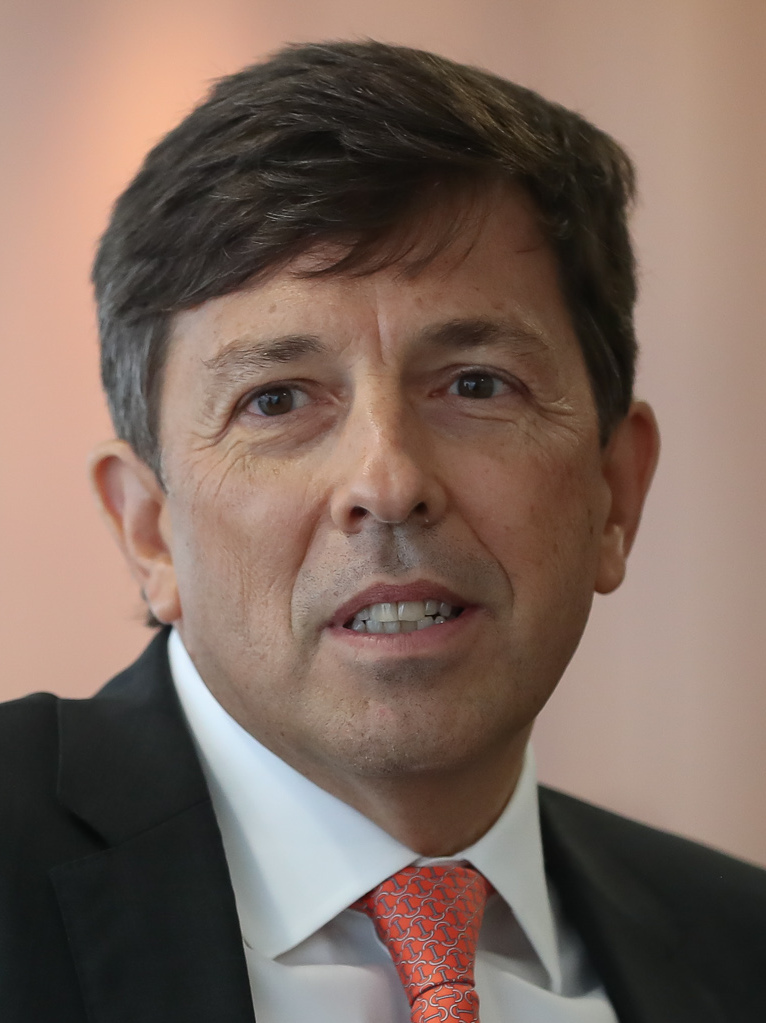

NOVO National President
- In office 30 January 2019 – 5 March 2020
- Preceded by: Moisés Jardim
- Succeeded by: Eduardo Ribeiro
- In office 12 February 2011 – 4 July 2017
- Preceded by: Office created
- Succeeded by: Ricardo Taboaço

Personal details
- Born: João Dionisio Filgueira Barreto Amoêdo; 22 October 1962 (age 64) Rio de Janeiro, Guanabara, Brazil
- Party: NOVO (2015–2022)^{a}
- Spouse: Rosa Helena Nasser (m. 1987)
- Children: 3
- Education: Federal University of Rio de Janeiro (BE); Pontifical Catholic University of Rio de Janeiro (BBA)
- a. Membership suspended: 27 October 2022 – 25 November 2022

João Dionisio Filgueira Barreto Amoêdo (born 22 October 1962), also known as João Amoêdo, is a Brazilian banker, engineer and businessman. He is one of the founders of the New Party (NOVO), which he presided from September 2015 to July 2017, and was its candidate in the 2018 Brazilian presidential election.

== Personal life ==
João Amoêdo is son of radiologist Armando Rocha Amoêdo and business owner Maria Elisa Filgueira Barreto. In 1987, Amoêdo married Rosa Helena Nasser and together they have three daughters. Always dedicated to sports, he completed six Ironman Triathlons and more than 10 marathons. In 2010, after recovering from a lymphoma, Amoêdo went back to his usual routine, including the sports. He remains active to this day.

== Founding the New Party ==
In 2009, during a talk with friends, Amoêdo showed himself frustrated with the amount of taxes paid and the disproportionate level of public services provided in return by the government. He started to question the possibility of involving examples of private initiative to improve public services with great management, meritocracy, and transparency.

After talks with politicians, he concluded that the only way to improve the lives of people is to bring new leadership to public life, creating a new institution - a political party different from the existing ones. The goal was to build a tool that would enable people that were never involved in politics but had an interest in it, and truly wanted to make a change, to participate. The only certainty, according to Amoêdo, was that the current politicians were not doing a good job, and the people had to get involved in order for true change to come about.

Along with 181 citizens, those of 35 different professions and native from 10 different states from the Federation, found NOVO on 12 February 2011. On 15 September 2015, Novo had its definitive register approved and Amoêdo became the president of the party, withdrawn from office since July 2017.

He left the New Party (NOVO) in November 2022, stating that the party he helped to found "no longer exists". He also stated that the party violates its own statute, manipulates the Ethics Committee to silence members, idolizes officeholders, and encourages anti-democratic actions. This decision came after internal criticism following Amoêdo's support for Luiz Inácio Lula da Silva, a member of the Workers' Party, in the second round of the 2022 Brazilian general election. In response, the New Party expressed regret over his statements, asserting that he had distanced himself from the party's principles and ideas.

== Political views ==
He is in favor of defense of individual liberties for understanding that the free market is the business environment that works better for everyone, that the individual is the main wealth generator and that he is an agent of changes. Founder of New Party, Amoêdo states that everyone elected by the party will follow the liberal ideal, with State reduction, greater autonomy of the individual and the reduction of taxes. About Bolsa Família, Amoêdo says in a column in Brazilian newspaper Folha de S. Paulo that the program would be "what brings one of the best returns in relation of the amount [of money] invested", but that it doesn't show a "clear way out".

Party political offices
| New political party | NOVO National President; 2011−2017; 2019–present | Succeeded by Ricardo Taboaço |
| Preceded by Moisés Jardim | NOVO National President; 2011−2017; 2019–present | Succeeded by Eduardo Ribeiro |
| New political party | NOVO nominee for President of Brazil; 2018 | Succeeded by Luiz Felipe d'Ávila |
