= Sandro Alex =

Brazilian politician (born 1972)

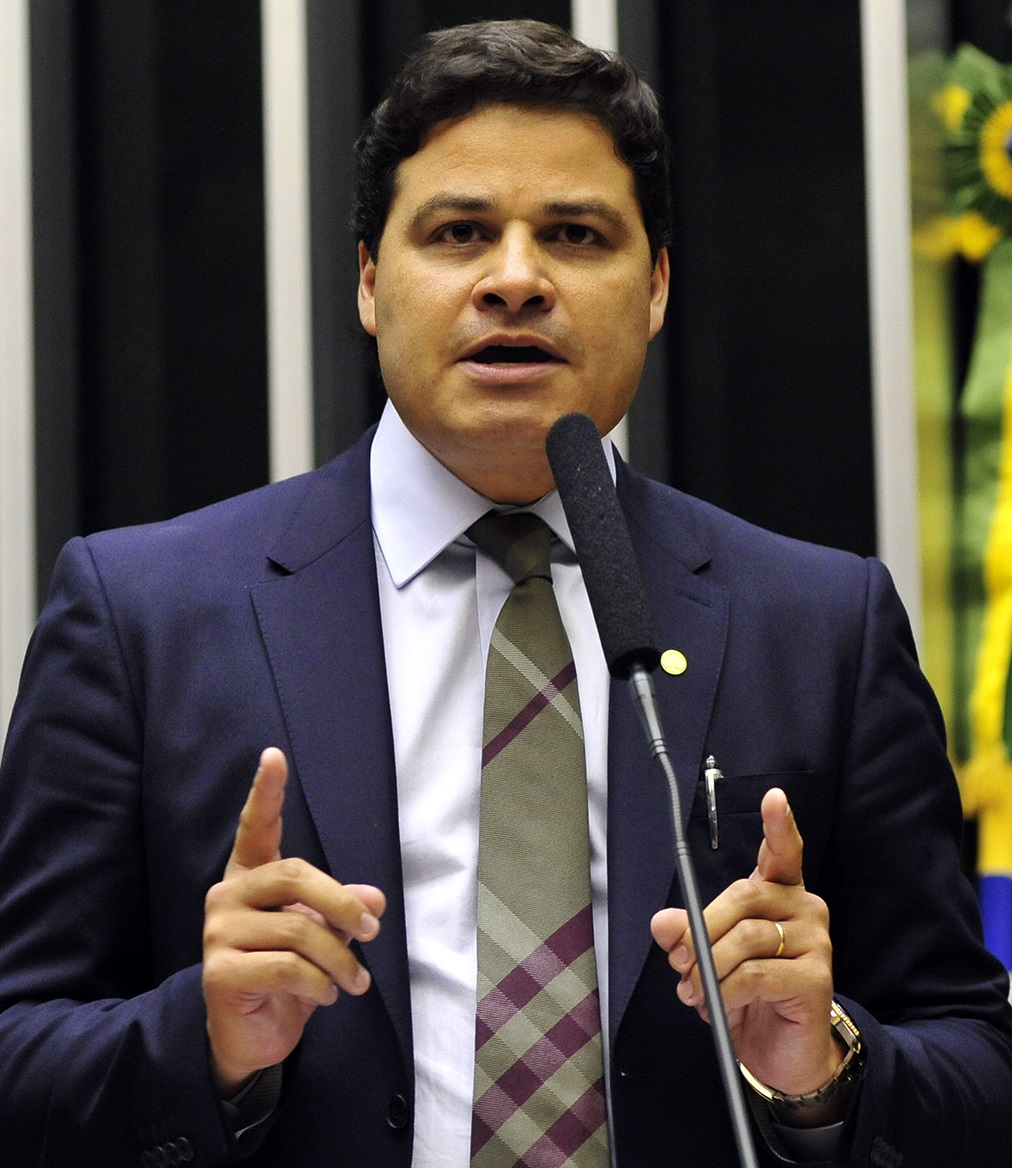
- Alex in 2015

Member of the Chamber of Deputies
- Incumbent
- Assumed office 1 February 2011
- Constituency: Paraná

Personal details
- Born: 25 November 1972 (age 53)
- Party: Social Democratic Party (since 2016)
- Relatives: Marcelo Rangel (brother)

Sandro Alex Cruz de Oliveira (born 25 November 1972) is a Brazilian politician serving as a member of the Chamber of Deputies since 2011. He is the brother of Marcelo Rangel.
