= Deltan Dallagnol =

Brazilian attorney

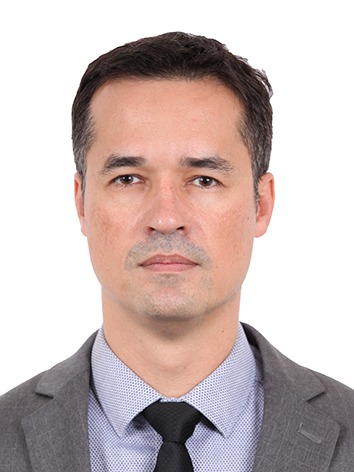
- Dallagnol in 2024

Member of the Chamber of Deputies
- In office 1 February 2023 – 6 June 2023
- Constituency: Paraná

Personal details
- Born: Deltan Martinazzo Dallagnol; 15 January 1980 (age 46) Pato Branco, Paraná, Brazil
- Party: NOVO (2023–present)
- Other political affiliations: PODE (2021–2023)
- Spouse: Fernanda Mourão Ribeiro (m. 2016)
- Education: Federal University of Paraná (LL.B.); Harvard University (LL.M.)
- Occupation: Federal prosecutor (retired)
- Known for: Operation Car Wash

Deltan Martinazzo Dallagnol (Brazilian Portuguese: [dewˈtɐ̃ maʁtʃiˈna.zu dalaɡˈnɔw]; born 15 January 1980) is a Brazilian politician affiliated to the New Party (NOVO). Dallagnol was also a federal prosecutor specialized in crimes against the national financial system and money laundering from 2003 to 2021. He is known for being the lead prosecutor of Operation Car Wash, an investigation into corruption in the Brazilian petroleum company Petrobras.

He was elected in 2022 Brazilian general elections to represent the state of Paraná in the Chamber of Deputies. His term of federal deputy was revoked on 16 May 2023 by the Superior Electoral Court of Brazil in a unanimous decision. On 6 June 2023, the Bureau of the Chamber of Deputies of Brazil confirmed the decision of the Superior Electoral Court that revoked his term, a decision based on the grounds that Dallagnol committed a fraud against the Ficha Limpa (Clean Record) act. He managed to collect around R$200 thousand (close to 40 thousand dollars) in donations to pay the fines.

== Early and personal life ==
Deltan Dallagnol was born in Pato Branco, in the state of Paraná. He is a Protestant Christian and a member of the Baptist Church.

== Operation Car Wash ==
Dallagnol was part of the original, Operation Car Wash task force formed in Curitiba in March 2014. In September 2020, Dallagnol announced that he would be leaving as coordinator of the Car Wash prosecution team. He requested dismissal from the Federal Public Ministry to avoid 15 administrative processes by the CNMP against him that could lead to compulsory retirement or loss of position.

=== PowerPoint of Charge ===
On September 14, 2016, Deltan Dallagnol and part of the Lava Jato team made a fake PowerPoint presentation of the summary of the charges against Luiz Inácio Lula da Silva, placing him as a "conductor of a criminal orchestra" but without offering a structured complaint of head of the criminal organization. The focal point of the controversy was the alleged statement "we have no proof, but we have conviction," which went viral on social networks as if it had existed. Officials said the prosecution was based on immunity negotiated accusations and the theories of "probabilism" and "explanationism" created and defended by the prosecutor himself to support the evidence-free evidence that remained at the end of the investigations.

In 2022, Lula filed a lawsuit asking for compensation alleging “violation of his honor” because in the PowerPoint presentation. The Superior Court of Justice condemned Deltan to compensate Lula in the amount of R$75,000. After the extraordinary appeal to reverse the conviction, in April 2024, the Federal Supreme Court denied the appeal to suspend the decision. There is no other legal recourse and Dallagnol will compensate President Lula da Silva for the “powerpoint case”.

=== Cooperation with foreign government ===
In April 2016, when the Americans forwarded the demand to the DRCI, the first formal request for cooperation between Operation Car Wash and the US occurred. Dallagnol, in charge of the collaboration, illegally began supplying the US with information and evidence against Petrobras, before the cooperation had even been officially formalized. Even the hearings heard by Dallagnol, carried out within the formalized cooperation period, did not comply with Brazilian laws.

With Dallagnol's help, the US Department of Justice reached an agreement with Petrobras to end the imbroglio in 2018. The agreement included a fine of almost 3 billion dollars. The US decided to return 80% of the amount collected from Petrobras to Brazil.

The work of administrative correction shows that Dallagnol informally negotiated with the Americans to return the money before the process was completed. He later tried to divert the resources to the Lava Jato Foundation, improperly approved by judge Gabriela Hardt in 2019.

=== Allegations of irregularities ===
In June 2019, reports published by The Intercept based on a large trove of leaked materials indicated that there were "legally dubious internal discussions" between Dallagnol, in the role of Chief Prosecutor, and lead judge Sergio Moro, resulting in an international furor, due to the alleged politically based, illegal coordination between the two teams. In November 2019, disciplinary proceedings against Dallagnol led to warnings imposed by the National Council of the Public Prosecution Service (CNMP).

In the leaked documents, a dialogue between Dallagnol and his subordinates provided the basis for opening an investigation into an intentional act of administrative improbity. He was convicted of misusing public funds meant for travel and accommodation expenses at certain times between 2014 and 2021. In one of his conversations about travel allowances, Dallagnol informed his team, "The more we spend now, the better."

The Federal Court of Auditors sentenced the former coordinator of Operation Car Wash and two others involved to compensate the public coffers in almost US$700 thousand.

== Political career ==
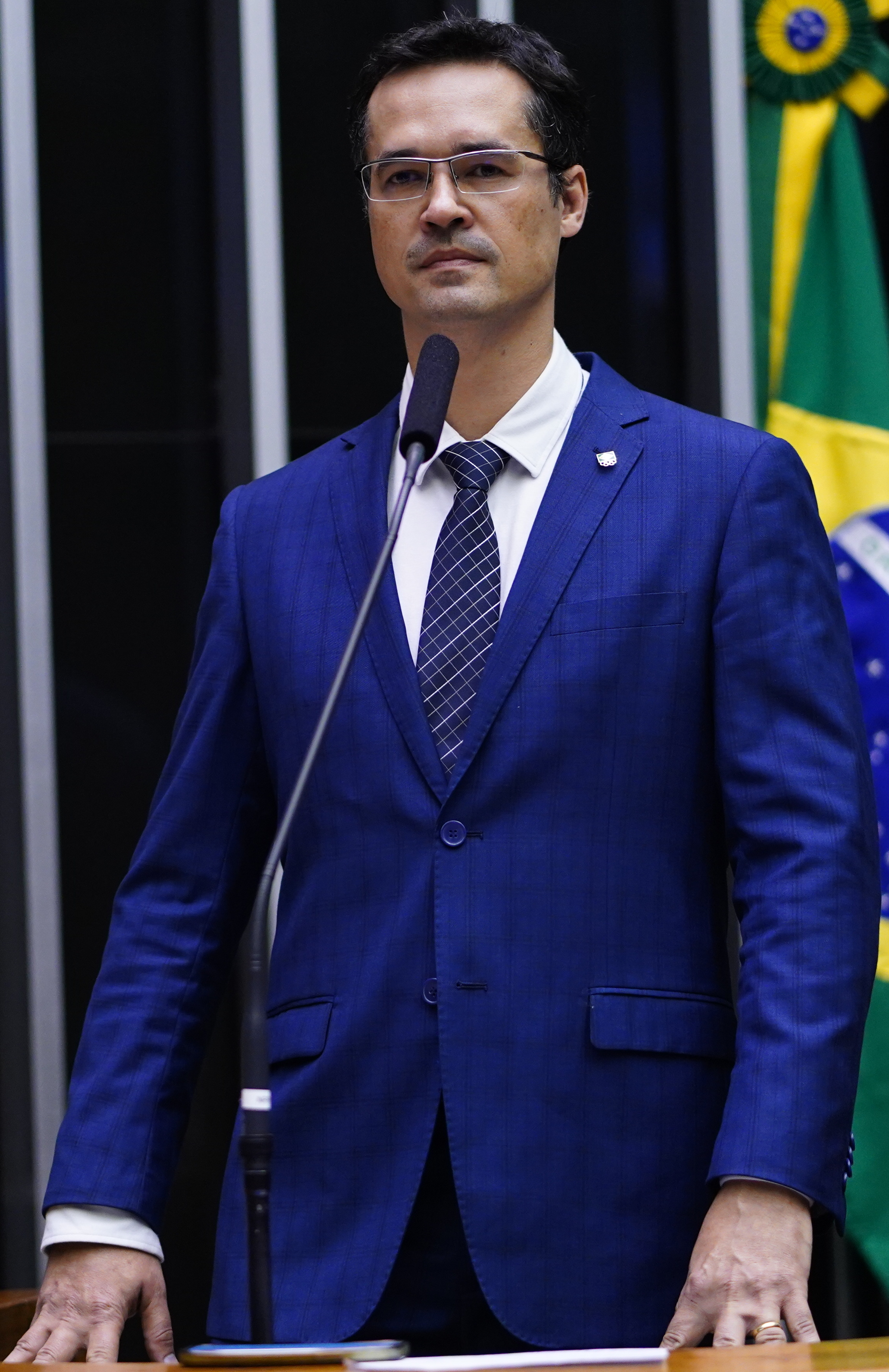
Dallagnol in 2023

Dallagnol joined Podemos (PODE) on December 10, 2021 and ran for a term of federal deputy in the state of Paraná in the 2022 Paraná parliamentary election, being elected as the most voted congressman in the state, with 344,917 votes.

He held office between 1 February and 16 May 2023, when his candidacy record was revoked by a unanimous decision of the Superior Electoral Court, based on a representation presented to the court by the Brazil of Hope federation (PT/PCdoB/PV) and the Party of National Mobilization (PMN). The representation stated that Dallagnol could not have left his career as a public prosecutor while he was responding to disciplinary complaints and investigations at the National Council of the Public Prosecution Service (CNMP).

The rapporteur judge of the case, Minister Benedito Gonçalves, understood that Dallagnol requested his early dismissal from the Public Prosecutor's Office (MPF) on 3 November 2021, when he had already been condemned by the CNMP to censure and a warning while 15 administrative proceedings against him were still pending at the National Council of the Public Prosecution Service. Gonçalves concluded that Dallagnol used his early dismissal as a manueaver to bypass the possibility of ineligibility for an eventual conviction in an administrative process. The court followed the vote of the rapporteur.

On 30 September 2023, he left Podemos and joined the New Party (NOVO).

== Electoral history ==
=== Chamber of Deputies ===
Election
Election	Party	Votes	%	Position in Paraná State	Result
2022	Podemos (PODE)	344,917	5.63	No. 1	Elected

== Personal life ==
He holds a law degree from the Federal University of Paraná and a LL.M. from Harvard University in 2013. Dallagnol is a practicing Baptist.
