= Ricardo Gomyde =

Brazilian politician (born 1970)

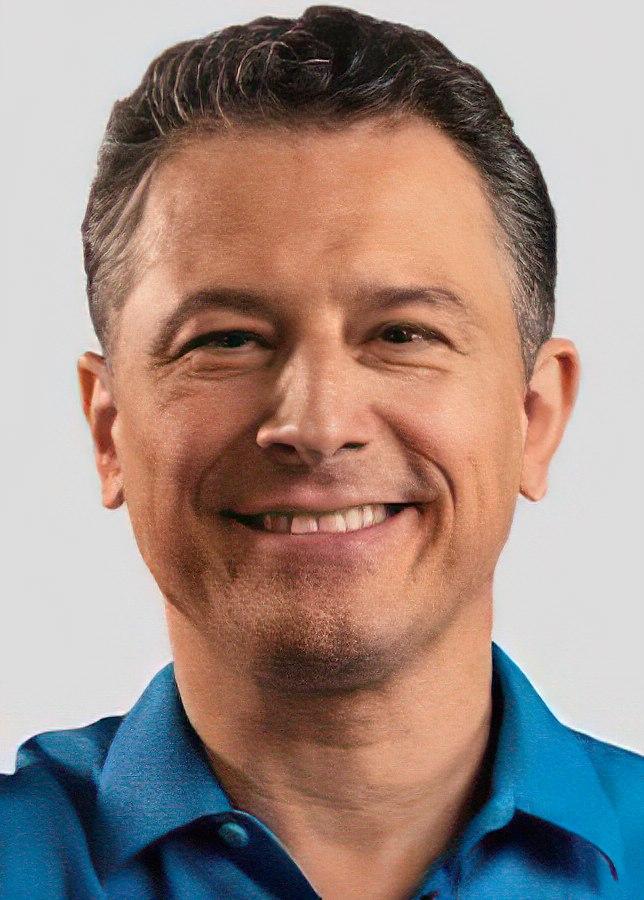
- Gomyde in 2022

Member of the Chamber of Deputies
- In office 1 February 1995 – 31 January 1999
- Constituency: Paraná

Personal details
- Born: 22 May 1970 (age 55)
- Party: DC (since 2026)

Ricardo Crachineski Gomyde (born 22 May 1970) is a Brazilian politician. From July to December 2024, he served as secretary of international relations of São Paulo. From 1995 to 1999, he was a member of the Chamber of Deputies.
