= Alex Canziani =

Brazilian politician (born 1964)

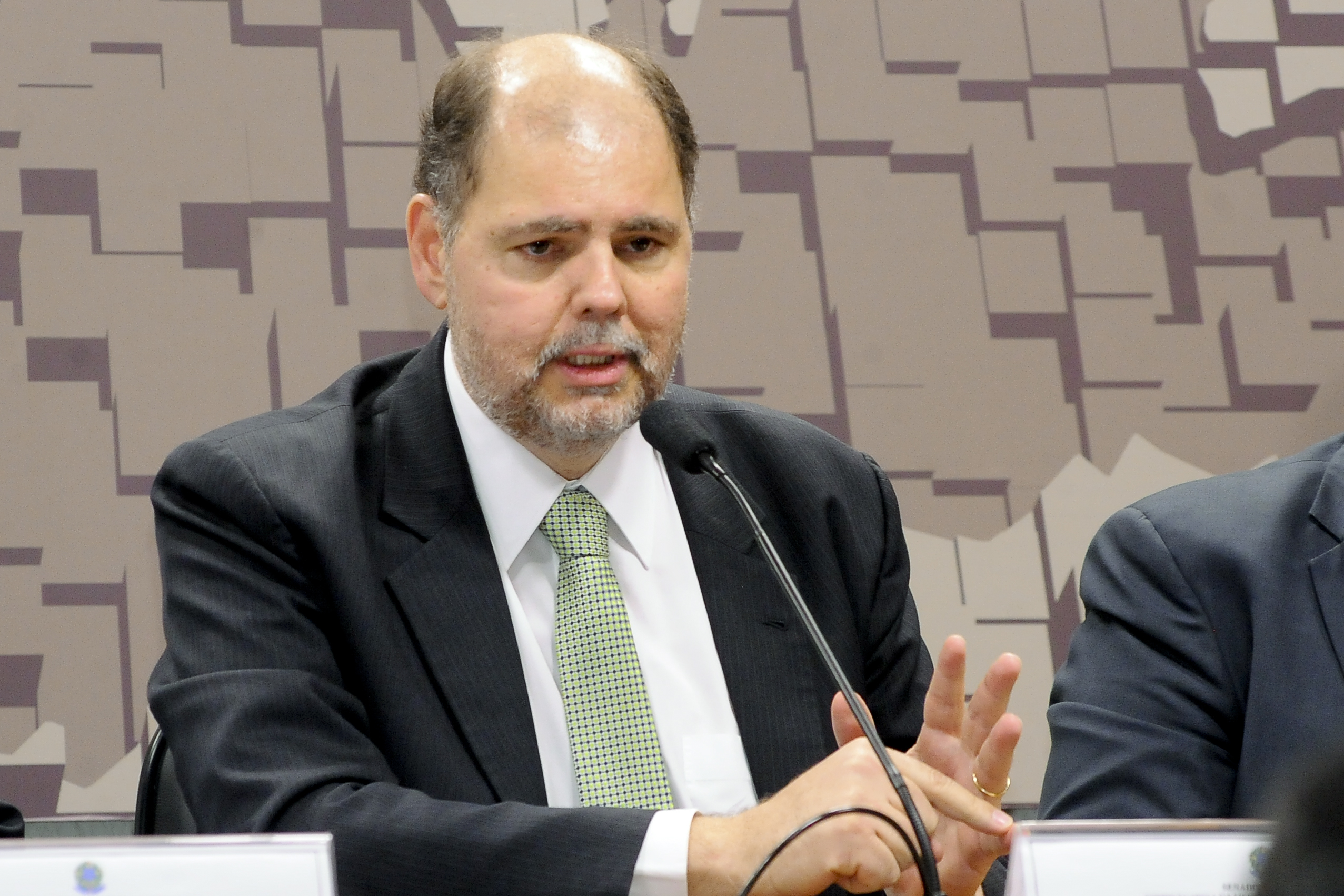
- Canziani in September 2017

Federal Deputy for Paraná
- In office 1 February 1999 – 31 January 2019

Federal Deputy for Londrina
- In office 1 January 1989 – 31 December 1995

Personal details
- Born: 11 June 1964 (age 62) Londrina, Brazil
- Party: PSD

Alex Canziani Silveira (born 11 June 1964) is a Brazilian politician as well as a lawyer and writer. He has spent his political career representing Paraná, having served in the state legislature from 1999 to 2019.

== Personal life ==
Canziani is married to Ana Lúcia dos Santos Silveira, and has two children, a daughter named Luísa and a son Alex Jr. His daughter Luísa is also a politician, being elected to the lower legislature in 2018. Canziani is an alumnus of the State University of Londrina, and also briefly served as part of the university faculty in from 1990 to 1991.

== Political career ==
Canziani voted in favor of the impeachment motion of then-president Dilma Rousseff. He voted in favor raising the spending ceiling of Brazil's government and the 2017 Brazilian labor reforms. Canziani voted against opening a similar corruption investigation into Rousseff's successor Michel Temer.

After serving in the federal chamber of deputies for 5 consecutive terms, he was succeeded by his daughter in 2019.
