= Cafelândia, Paraná =

Cafelândia
- Municipality
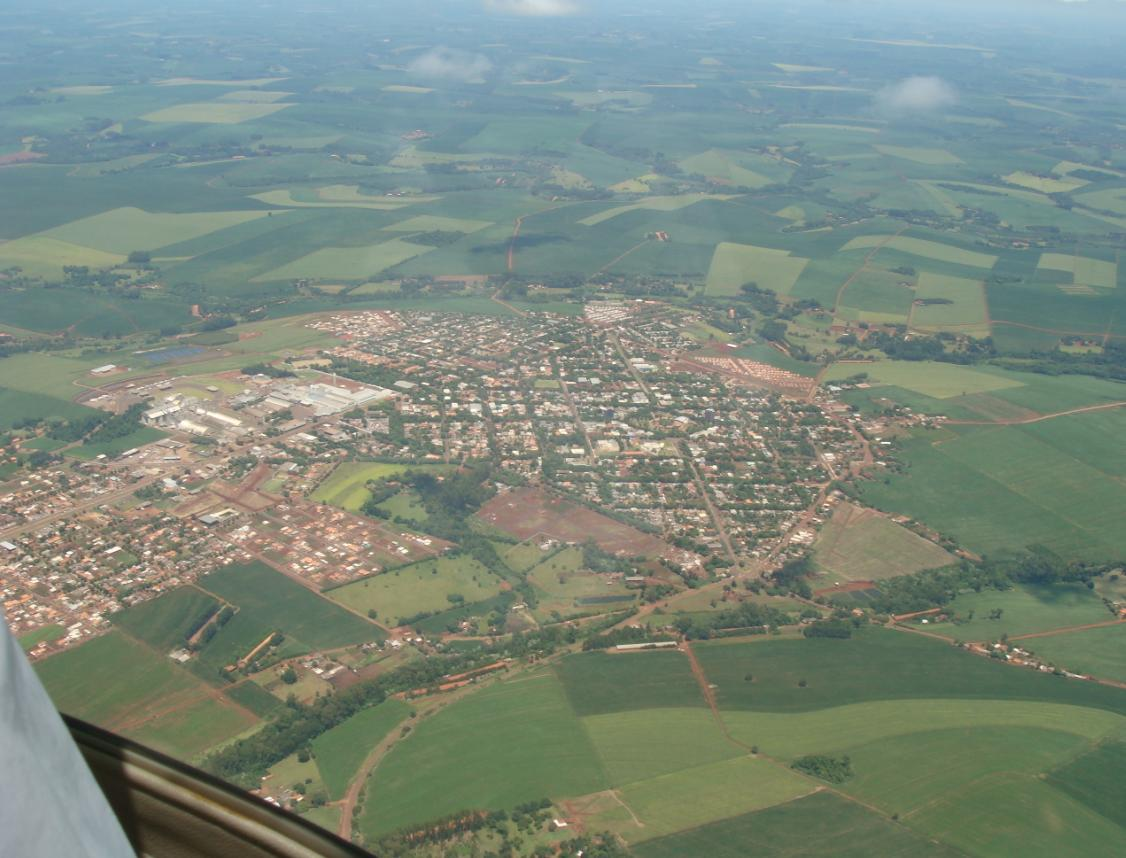
- Cafelândia

- Flag Coat of arms

- Location in Brazil
- Coordinates: 24°37′4″S 53°19′12″W
- Country: Brazil
- Region: Southern
- State: Paraná
- Mesoregion: Oeste Paranaense

Government
  - Mayor: Junior Motter (Novo, 2025–2028)

Area
  - Total: 10,491 sq mi (27,172 km^{2})

Population (2020)
  - Total: 18,456
- Time zone: UTC−3 (BRT)

Cafelândia is a municipality in the state of Paraná in the Southern Region of Brazil.

== See also ==
- List of municipalities in Paraná
- Copacol
