= Rosane Ferreira =

Brazilian politician and nurse

Her Excellency Rosane Ferreira
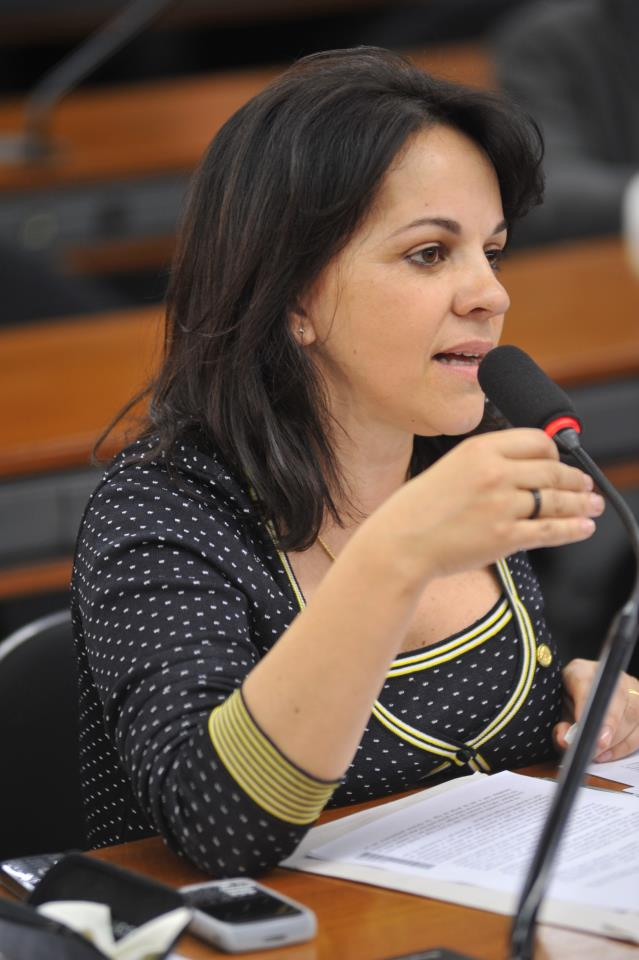

Federal Deputy for state of Paraná
- In office 1 February 2011 – 31 January 2015
- President: Dilma Rousseff

Federal Deputy for the state of Roraima

Personal details
- Born: July 31, 1963 (age 62) Clevelândia, Parná, Brazil
- Party: Green Party (Brazil)

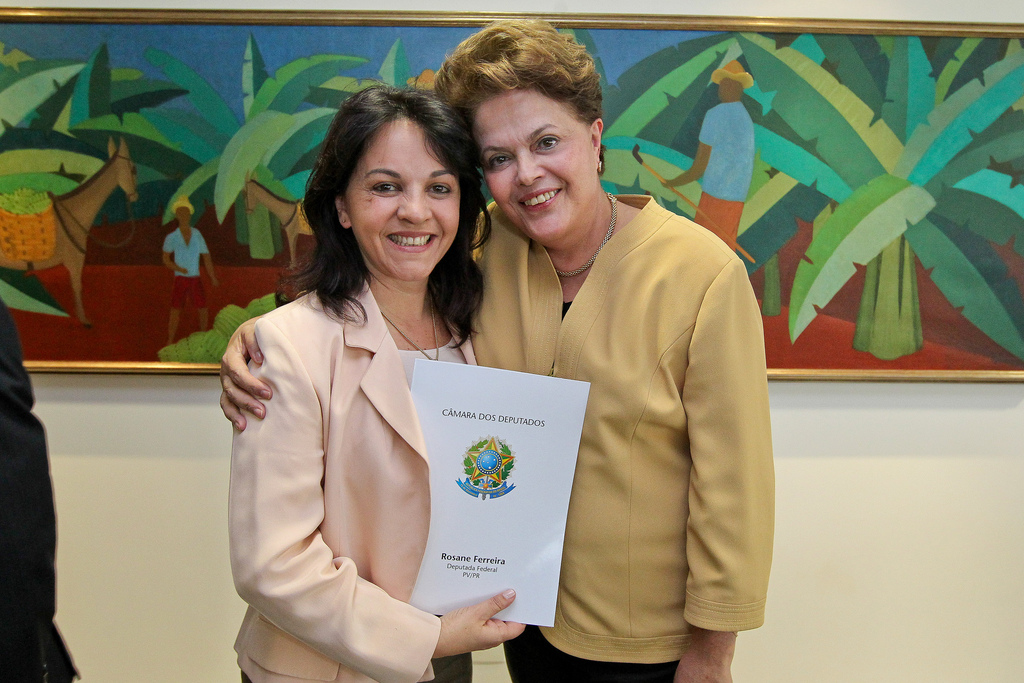
Rosane Ferreira and Dilma Rousseff.

Rosane Ferreira (Cleusa Rosane Ribas Ferreira, born Clevelândia, Paraná, July 31, 1963), is a Brazilian nurse and politician.

== Early life ==
At six months old she moved with her mother Virginia Martins Ribas to União da Vitória. At age 19 she moved to Araucária, Curitiba, to attend college. She graduated in Nursing and Midwifery from the Pontifical Catholic University of Paraná in 1988.

She studied Public Health at the Oswaldo Cruz Foundation (Rio de Janeiro) in 1997, followed by an improvement in Collective Health at Federal University of Paraná in 2004. She conducted training courses in Health Planning at the Federal University of Santa Catarina and nursing locomotor Hospital Sarah Kubitschek in Brasília.

== Career ==
In 1983 she worked in Araucária, in the Nurse Family Health program. She coordinated health centers with the supervision of Units Network Health as director of the Departments of Health and Sanitation and Health Surveillance. In this position she developed teaching activities as an instructor and attendant nurse and trained community health workers. She assisted in the implementation of the Pastoral, was a member of the Pastoral Worker and Family and the President of the Municipal Health Council in 2004 and 2005.

== Recognition ==
- Anna Nery Award (2011) Federal Board of Nursing, for her involvement in the causes of nursing as Congresswoman
