= Filipe Barros (politician) =

Brazilian politician (born 1991)

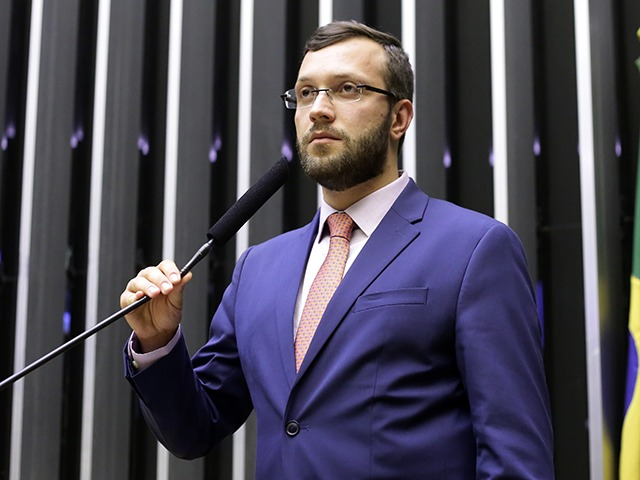
Deputy Filipe Barros in 2021.

Filipe Barros Baptista de Toledo Ribeiro (born 29 May 1991) is a Brazilian lawyer and federal deputy for the state of Paraná.

Born in Londrina and since 2022 he is affiliated with the Partido Liberal (PL).

He is anticommunist and an ally of president Jair Bolsonaro.
