= New Party (Brazil) =

Political party in Brazil

New Party Partido Novo
- Abbreviation: NOVO
- President: Eduardo Rodrigo Fernandes Ribeiro
- Vice President: Alfredo Adolfo Schnabel Fuentes
- Founded: 12 February 2011
- Registered: 15 September 2015
- Headquarters: São Paulo
- Think tank: Instituto Libertas
- Membership (2025): ▲70,000
- Ideology: Conservative liberalism; Libertarianism
- Political position: Far-right
- Colours: Orange; White
- Slogan: We respect Brazil
- TSE Identification Number: 30
- Federal Senate: 1 / 81
- Chamber of Deputies: 5 / 513
- Governorships: 1 / 27
- State Assemblies: 5 / 1,024
- Mayors: 19 / 5,568
- City Councillors: 263 / 56,810

Party flag

Website
- novo.org.br

The New Party (Portuguese: Partido Novo, stylised NOVO) is a far-right political party in Brazil, founded on 12 February 2011.

The party was registered on 23 July 2014, supported by the signatures of 493,316 citizens. Its creation was approved on 15 September 2015. The party requested to use the number "30" for election identification.

== History ==
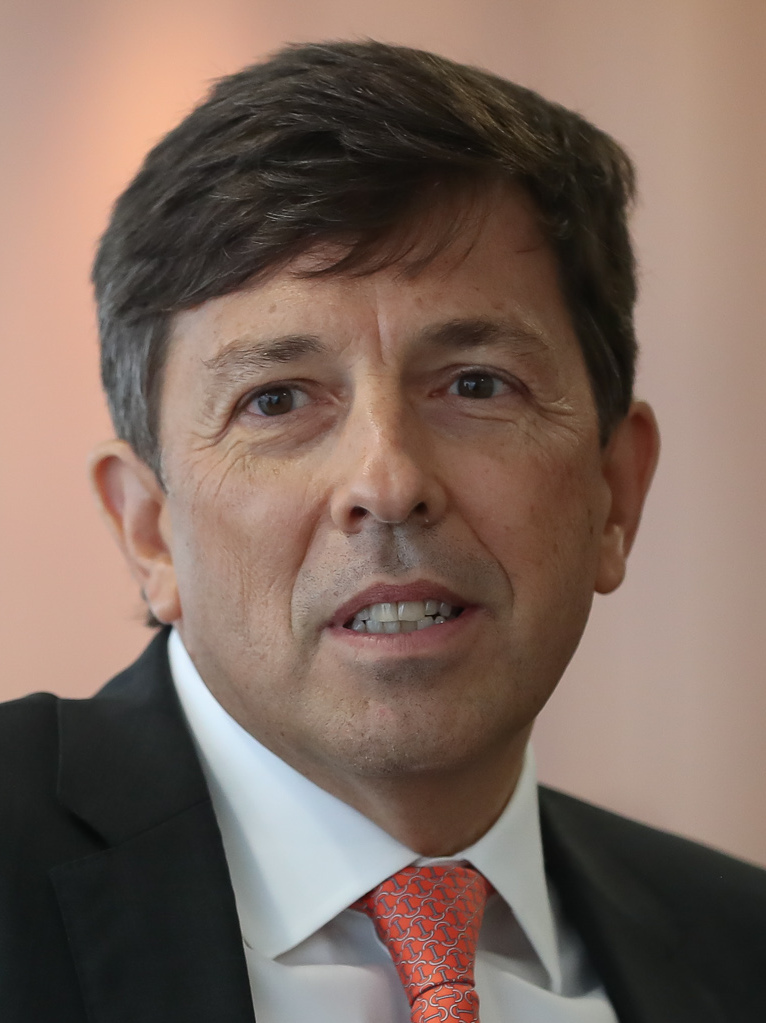
João Amoêdo, banker, engineer and businessman, was one of the founders of NOVO and ones its main figures, being the party's candidate for the 2018 Brazilian elections. Amoêdo was expelled from the party in 2022.

NOVO was founded on 12 February 2011 by 181 citizens of 35 different professions and originating from 10 different federative units. In an interview with InfoMoney, João Amoêdo, founder of NOVO, stated that none of the existing political parties would defend NOVO's ideals, and as such, it was easier to create a party from scratch. Amoêdo also paid for the majority of the R$5 million expenses surrounding the Party's founding, contributing with R$4.5 million. Pedro Moreira Salles also contributed with around R$100,000 and Cecília Sicupira, wife to businessman Carlos Alberto Sicupira also made a significant contribution.

Formally registered as a political party in 2015, NOVO won eight deputies in the 2018 elections and had one of its own, Romeu Zema, elected governor of Minas Gerais, Brazil's second most populous state. João Amoêdo himself was the Party's nominee for the presidential election, where he obtained 2.5% of the vote.

The years of the Bolsonaro administration were marked by internal conflicts for the New Party, with members such as Filipe Sabará being expelled from the party in the midst of the 2020 municipal elections, where he was NOVO's mayoral candidate for São Paulo. Sabará was expelled by the party after a series of inconsistencies were found in his resume, but had previously quarreled with Amoêdo and other NOVO leaderships over his support for Bolsonaro. For Camila Rocha, author of the book "Less Marx, More Mises: Liberalism and the new right in Brazil", those conflicts stemmed from a lack of a party-wide consensus in ideas other than the defense of a radical free market.

The New Party symbol from 2015 to 2023

Amoêdo himself was expelled from the party during the 2022 election for his endorsement of Luiz Inácio Lula da Silva and for publicly criticizing the party in media interviews. For Amoêdo, NOVO had become a "satellite of the Liberal Party". After the first turn of the 2022 presidential election, candidate Luiz Felipe D'Avila criticized Amoêdo, stating in an interview that his behaviour had caused "disillusions" and "only contributes to destroying what he has built".

NOVO won only 0.47% of the vote in the 2022 presidential election and three deputies in the parliamentary elections, but managed to get Romeu Zema re-elected governor of Minas Gerais. D'Avila attributed the election results to voters "doubling down on polarization", stating that the election had been "very poor in discussing proposals".

In the first turn of the 2024 municipal elections, the party elected 14 new mayors and managed to get its 4 preexisting mayors reelected. NOVO also saw an 800% increase in elected city councillors, a success that NOVO president Eduardo Ribeiro attributed to their decision to ease restrictions on party membership and candidacy in smaller municipalities, seeking to expand their reach whilst preserving party ideals. Ribeiro argued that the party's decision to restrict expansion had cost them in 2020 and 2022. NOVO registered 7,604 candidacies (compared to 620 in the 2020 elections), of which 34% were women and 43% were Black or Pardo Brazilians. In the runoff of the elections, NOVO also elected Sérgio Victor as mayor of Taubaté.

== Ideology ==
The New Party advocates for a free market economy featuring a minimal state and an absolute defense of the right to property. According to their website, NOVO believes in a "simple, light and efficient" state with a lean administrative structure focused on healthcare, public security and basic education. It argues for the flexibilization of laws such as the Brazilian Labor Code (CLT), the privatization of state-owned enterprises like Petrobras and Bank of Brazil, and the seeking of private partnerships for Brazilian public universities. Other flagship NOVO proposals include trade liberalization and the signing of a new federative pact seeking decentralization and an increased autonomy for individual states.

It allows its members freedom to choose their stances on social issues such as abortion and the legalization of drugs, but the party believes that legislation on those topics should be defined solely by the Brazilian National Congress. NOVO is pro-gun rights and supports same sex marriage.

Other NOVO proposals include reforming the political system by ending compulsory voting and parliamentary immunity, and extinguishing the Partisan and Electoral funds. Public security proposals include reviewing and hardening the Brazilian Penal Code, increasing benefits for police officers and adopting public-private partnerships to manage the Brazilian prison system.

The party opposes extensive regulation in many aspects of Brazilian society and their members believe the central bank should be independent from the state.

The New Party charges a membership fee and monthly contributions from its members. Originally, NOVO committed itself to not using any public money from the Electoral or Partisan Funds, maintaining itself solely through donations and member contributions. Public funds were invested into fixed income securities in the Bank of Brazil after attempts to return the money were rejected. For the 2024 elections, the party defined criteria for the usage of Electoral Fund money, citing the increase in the Electoral Fund budget and difficulties caused by increased regulations around private financing.

== National presidents ==
Name	Mandate	Ref.
João Amoêdo	12 February 2011 – 4 July 2017	
Ricardo Taboaço	4 July 2017 – 25 July 2017	
Moisés Jardim	25 July 2017 – 30 January 2019	
João Amoêdo	30 January 2019 – 5 March 2020	
Eduardo Ribeiro	5 March 2020 – present	

== Electoral results ==
=== Presidential election ===
Election	Candidate	Running mate	Coalition	First round		Second round		Result
Election	Candidate	Running mate	Coalition	Votes	%	Votes	%	Result
2018	João Amoêdo (NOVO)	Christian Lohbauer (NOVO)	None	2,679,745	2.50%	–	–	Lost ✗
2022	Luiz Felipe d'Avila (NOVO)	Tiago Mitraud (NOVO)	None	559,708	0.47%	–	–	Lost ✗
2026	Romeu Zema (NOVO)	Eduardo Girão (NOVO)	None	325,683	0.27%	–	–	Lost ✗

=== Legislative elections ===
Election	Chamber of Deputies				Federal Senate				Role in government
Election	Votes	%	Seats	+/–	Votes	%	Seats	+/–	Role in government
2018	2,748,079	2.79%	8 / 513	New	3,467,746	2.02%	0 / 81	New	Independent
2022	1,360,590	1.23%	3 / 513	▼5	479,593	0.47%	0 / 81	0	Opposition
2026	2,914,364	2.56%	10 / 513	▲7	11,067,357	5.34%	3 / 81	▲3	Opposition

== Notable members ==
=== Current members ===
- Deltan Dallagnol
- Luiz Felipe d'Avila
- Eduardo Girão
- Marcel van Hattem
- Vinicius Poit
- Ricardo Salles
- Adriano Silva
- Romeu Zema
- Paulo Eduardo Martins.

=== Former members ===
- João Amoêdo
- Heni Ozi Cukier
- Luiz Philippe of Orléans-Braganza
- Soraya Thronicke

== See also ==
- List of political parties in Brazil

Preceded by 29 – WCP (PCO)	Numbers of Brazilian Official Political Parties; 30 – NEW (NOVO)	Succeeded by 33 – MOBILIZE (MOBILIZA)
