= Timeline of Curitiba =

Coordinates: 25.416667°S 49.25°W

The following is a timeline of the history of the city of Curitiba, Paraná, Brazil.

== Prior to 20th century ==
- 1668 - Igreja de Nossa Senhora da Luz (church) built.
- 1693 - Village settlement named "Vila da Nossa Senhora da Luz dos Pinhais."
- 1721 - Village renamed "Curitiba."
- 1780 - Population: 2,949.
- 1854 - Curitiba becomes capital of Paraná.
- 1872 - Population: 12,651.
- 1874 - Arsenal built.
- 1886 - Passeio Público (Curitiba) (park) opens.
- 1890 - Population: 24,553.
- 1892 - Catholic Diocese of Curitiba established.
- 1893 - Catedral Basílica Menor Nossa Senhora da Luz built.
- 1900 - Population: 49,755.

== 20th century ==
- 1909 - Coritiba Foot Ball Club formed.
- 1912 - Federal University of Paraná established.
- 1919 - Gazeta do Povo newspaper begins publication.
- 1920 - Population: 78,986.
- 1924 - Clube Atlético Paranaense football team formed.
- 1947 - Estádio Vila Capanema (stadium) opens.
- 1950
  - June: Part of 1950 FIFA World Cup held in city.
  - Population: 138,178.
- 1951 - O Estado do Paraná newspaper begins publication.
- 1953 - Centro Cívico (Curitiba) inaugurated.
- 1954
  - Biblioteca Pública do Paraná (library) building and Teatro Guaíra (theatre) open.
  - Ney Braga becomes mayor.
- 1956 - Tribuna do Paraná newspaper begins publication.
- 1960 - Population: 356,830.
- 1962 - Japan Square (Curitiba) built.
- 1966 - Institute of Urban Planning and Research of Curitiba founded.
- 1967 - Flag design adopted.
- 1968 - Curitiba Master Plan adopted.
- 1970
  - Paraná Contemporary Art Museum established.
  - Population: 483,038 city; 583,857 urban agglomeration.
- 1971
  - Teatro Paiol (theatre) opens.
  - Jaime Lerner becomes mayor.
- 1972 - Rua XV de Novembro pedestrianized.
- 1973 - Curitiba Cultural Foundation established.
- 1974 - Rede Integrada de Transporte (transit system) begins operating.
- 1976 - Iguaçu Park opens.
- 1980
  - 5 July: Catholic pope visits city.
  - Population: 1,025,079.
- 1985 - Symphony Orchestra of Paraná founded.
- 1988 - Curitiba Metropolitan Museum of Art established.
- 1989
  - City recycling program and Paraná Clube football team established.
  - Perhappiness poetry event begins.
- 1991
  - Botanical Garden of Curitiba opens.
  - Rua 24 Horas shopping mall in business.
  - Population: 1,313,094.
- 1992
  - Wire Opera House opens.
  - World Cities Forum held in Curitiba.
  - Bairro Novo developed.
- 1993 - Population: 1,364,320 (estimate).
- 1999 - Arena da Baixada opens.
- 2000 - Population: 1,586,848.

== 21st century ==
- 2002 - New Museum opens.
- 2003 - City designated an American Capital of Culture.
- 2008 - Temple of the Church of Jesus Christ of Latter-day Saints built and dedicated.
- 2010 - Population: 1,751,907.
- 2012 - 7 October: Curitiba 2012 municipal election held.
- 2013 - Gustavo Fruet becomes mayor.
- 2014 - June: Part of 2014 FIFA World Cup held in city.
- 2016 - 2 October: Curitiba 2016 municipal election held.

== See also ==
- History of Curitiba
- List of mayors of Curitiba
- History of Paraná (state)
- Etymology of Curitiba

== Bibliography ==
=== in English ===
- Ernst B. Filsinger (1922), "Brazil: Curityba", Commercial Travelers' Guide to Latin America, Washington, DC: Government Printing Office
- Frontline (2003), "Master Plan: History", Curitiba's Urban Experiment, USA: Public Broadcasting Service
- Arthur Lubow (20 May 2007), "The Road to Curitiba", New York Times
- "Curitiba". Eco2 Cities: Ecological Cities as Economic Cities. World Bank Publications. 2010. ISBN 978-0-8213-8144-1.

=== in Portuguese ===
- J.C.R. Milliet de Saint-Adolphe (1863), "Curitiba", Diccionario geographico, historico e descriptivo, do imperio do Brazil (in Portuguese), Paris: J. P. Aillaud, hdl:2027/wu.89006303085 – via HathiTrust
- Fábio Duarte; Kati Eliana Caetano (2007). Curitiba: do modelo à modelagem (in Portuguese). Annablume. ISBN 978-85-7419-734-0.
