= List of mayors of Curitiba =

Mayor of Curitiba
- Prefeito de Curitiba

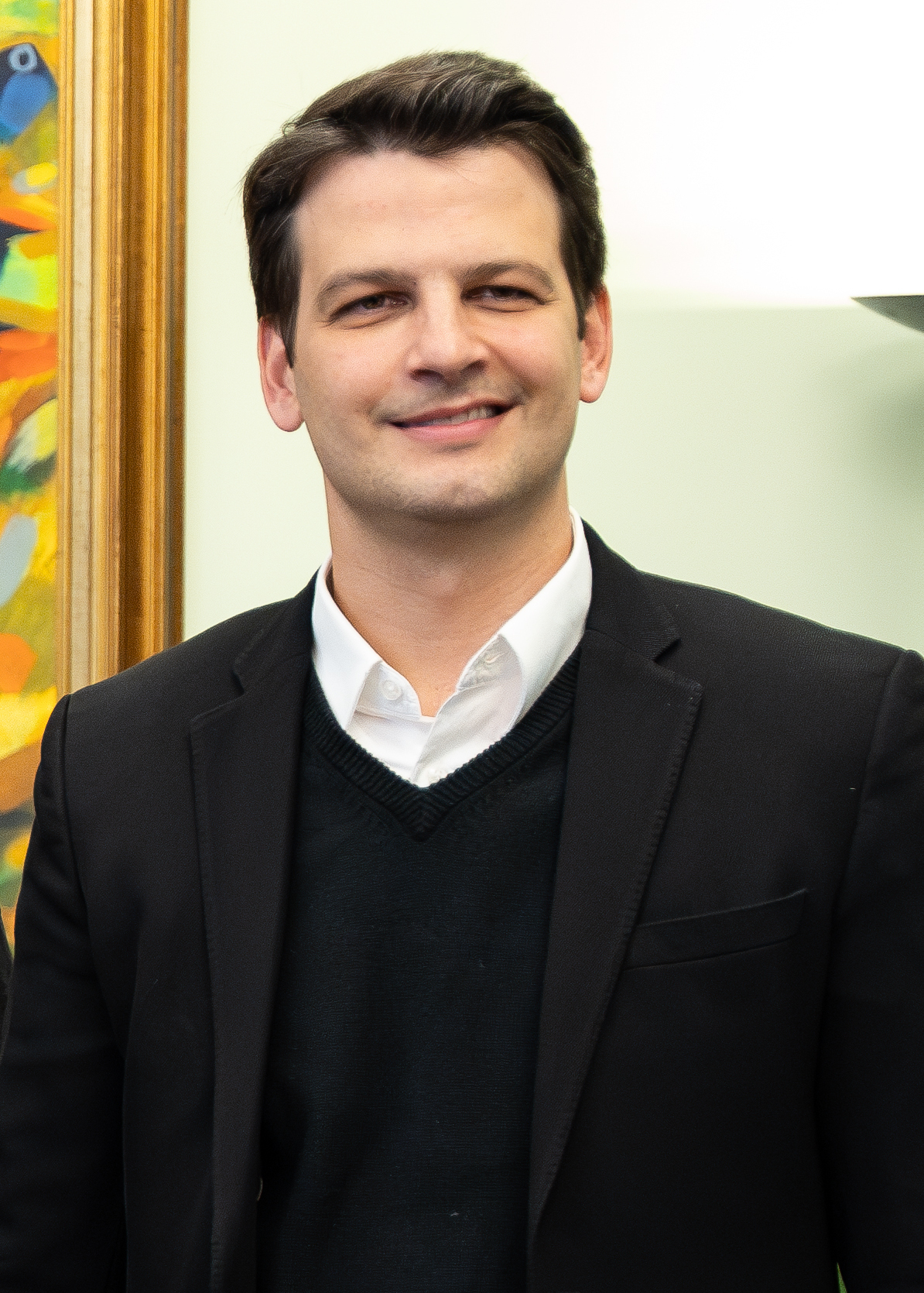
- Incumbent; Eduardo Pimentel since 1 January 2025
- Term length: Four years, renewable once consecutively
- Inaugural holder: José Borges de Macedo
- Formation: 1835
- Deputy: Vice Mayor
- Website: https://gabineteprefeito.curitiba.pr.gov.br/

This is a list of that have served as the mayor of the City of Curitiba, Brazil.

#	Mayor	From	To
1	José Borges de Macedo	1835	1838
2	Cândido Ferreira de Abreu	1892	1894
3	Guilherme Xavier de Miranda	1894	1894
4	Cyro Persiano Veloso	1895	1895
5	Jorge Hermano Meyer	1896	1896
6	Cícero Gonçalves Marques	1896	1896
7	Ignácio de Paula França	1897	1897
8	Manuel José Gonçalves	1897	1898
9	Cícero Gonçalves Marques	1897	1900
10	Artur de Souza Ferreira	1900	1900
11	Luiz Antônio Xavier	1900	1907
12	Antônio Rodrigues da Costa	1907	1908
13	Joaquim Pereira de Macedo	1908	1912
14	João Antônio Xavier	1912	1912
15	Cândido Ferreira de Abreu	1913	1916
16	João Antônio Xavier	1916	1916
17	Claudino Rogoberto Ferreira dos Santos	1916	1916
18	João Antônio Xavier	1917	1920
19	Percy Withers	1920	1920
20	João Moreira Garcez	1920	1924
21	João Moreira Garcez	1924	1928
22	Eurides Cunha	1928	1930
23	Joaquim Pereira de Macedo	1930	1932
24	Avelino Lopes	1932	1932
25	Jorge Lothário Meissner	1932	1937
26	Nicolau Mader Júnior	1937	1937
27	Aluísio França	1937	1937
28	Carlos Heller	1937	1938
29	Oscar Borges	1938	1938
30	João Moreira Garcez	1938	1940
31	Ângelo Lopes	1940	1940
32	Rozaldo Gomes de Mello Leitão	1940	1943
33	Alexandre Beltrão	1943	1944
34	Arnaldo Isidoro Beckert	1944	1944
35	João Macedo Sousa	1945	1945
36	Alô Guimarães	1945	1945
37	Algacyr Munhoz Maeder	1945	1945
38	João Macedo Sousa	1946	1946
39	Ângelo Lopes	1947	1947
40	Raul de Azevedo Macedo	1947	1947
41	João Kracik Neto	1947	1947
42	João Macedo Sousa	1947	1947
43	João Kracik Neto	1948	1948
44	Ney Leprevost	1948	1948
45	Lineu do Amaral	1949	1951
46	Amâncio Moro	1951	1951
47	Ernani Santiago de Oliveira	1951	1951
48	Wallace Tadeu de Melo e Silva	1951	1951
49	Erasto Gaertner	1951	1953
50	Mario Afonso Alves de Camargo	1952	1952
51	João Stival	1952	1952
52	Myltho Anselmo da Silva	1953	1953
53	José Luis Guerra Rego	1953	1954
54	Ernani Santiago de Oliveira	1954	1954
55	Nei Amintas de Barros Braga	1954	1958
56	Aristides Simão	1958	1958
57	Elias Karam	1958	1958
58	Edmundo Leinig Saporski	1958	1958
59	Elias Karam	1958	1958
60	Iberê de Matos	1958	1961
61	Aristides Ataíde Júnior	1961	1961
62	Erondy Sivério	1961	1961
63	Erondy Sivério	1962	1962
64	Ivo Arzua Pereira	1962	1966
65	Erondy Sivério	1966	1966
66	Ivo Arzua Pereira	1966	1967
67	Acyr Hafez José	1967	1967
68	Omar Sabbag	1967	1971
69	Edgar Dantas Pimentel	1971	1971
70	Jaime Lerner	1971	1974
71	Donato Gulin	1974	1974
72	Saul Raiz	1975	1979
73	Jaime Lerner	1979	1983
74	Maurício Fruet	1983	1985
75	Roberto Requião	1986	1988
76	Jaime Lerner	1989	1992
77	Rafael Greca	1993	1996
78	Cássio Taniguchi	1997	2004
79	Carlos Alberto "Beto" Richa	2005	2010
80	Luciano Ducci	2010	2012
81	Gustavo Fruet	2013	2016
82	Rafael Greca	2017	2024
83	Eduardo Pimentel	2025	present

== See also ==
- History of Curitiba
- Timeline of Curitiba
- History of Paraná (state)
- List of mayors of largest cities in Brazil (in Portuguese)
- List of mayors of capitals of Brazil (in Portuguese)
