= History of Paraná =

Flag of the state of Paraná.

The history of the state of Paraná, in Brazil, began before the discovery of Brazil, at a time when the first inhabitants of what is now the territory of the state were the three indigenous peoples, namely: Tupi-Guaranís, Kaingangs, and Xoklengs. The first cities founded in the state were Paranaguá, Curitiba, Castro, Ponta Grossa, Palmeira, Lapa, Guarapuava, and Palmas.

== Overview ==
In the pre-colonial period, in the 16th century, the region was forgotten by Portugal and was explored by other countries that sought hardwood. The most important expeditions were by the Spanish, who brought members of the Society of Jesus, founding settlement centers in western Paraná. Between 1521 and 1525, the region of the rivers Paraná, Paranapanema, Tibagi, and Iguazu was navigated by Aleixo Garcia, leading a bandeira that crossed Paraná and reached the Andes. In January 1542, the Spanish conquistador Álvar Núñez Cabeza de Vaca, following the Peabiru Trail, reached the Iguazu Falls, being the first European to describe them (in his work Comentários).

Besides Cabeza de Vaca, the German explorers Hans Staden, in 1549, and Ulrich Schmidl, in 1552, also passed through the current territory of Paraná. In 1554, Ontiveros, one league from the Salto das Sete Quedas, was founded by Domingo Martínez de Irala, Governor of Paraguay. Later, three leagues from Ontiveros, the Ciudad Real del Guayrá was founded at the mouth of the Piquiri River. In 1576, the Spanish founded Vila Rica do Espírito Santo on the left bank of the Paraná River. With three cities and several "reductions" or "pueblos", the region was at that time known as Provincia Real del Guaíra.

In the early years of the 17th century, after gold was discovered in the lands of Paraná, the Portuguese-Brazilians began the occupation of the region, through bandeiras that left São Vicente. In 1629, most of the establishments of the Jesuit priests were destroyed by the bandeirantes from São Paulo and, in 1632, Antônio Raposo Tavares surrounded and destroyed Vila Rica, the last Spanish stronghold.

The settlers established themselves on the coast as well as on the plateau of Paraná, Paranaguá being the most popular destination, and one of the southernmost points in Portuguese America. In 1693, Curitiba was elevated to the category of town and became the center that would command the territorial expansion of Paraná. Exploiting the gold proved to be difficult, as no advanced methods were known and because labor was scarce. In Paraná gold was discovered before Minas Gerais, but with the discovery of the ore in the latter, gold exploration in Paraná was mostly abandoned.

In 1820, the western territory of Paraná was handed over to the Portuguese crown and became politically annexed to the Province of São Paulo, receiving the name Comarca de Curitiba. The people began to dedicate themselves to farming and cattle breeding. Curitiba prospered because it was necessary to feed and transport the miners from Minas Gerais. And with the opening of the Viamão-Sorocaba road, which made the connection between Rio Grande do Sul and São Paulo through the Curitiba region, a new phase in Paraná's history began: The tropeirismo, which had extended throughout the 18th and 19th centuries. Cattle ranches spread, and the main human figure began to be the cattle rancher.

The districts of Paranaguá and Curitiba, then part of the Captaincy of São Paulo, were founded on November 19, 1811. Despite Brazil's independence, the region was continuously subordinated to the Province of São Paulo. On February 6, 1842, Curitiba was elevated to the category of city by a provincial law. On August 29, 1853, at last, Emperor Pedro II of Brazil signed Imperial Law No. 704, which created the Province of Paraná. Among the reasons for this are: Punishment for the Paulistans' participation in the Liberal Revolt of 1842, a settlement for the support Paraná offered to the Ragamuffin War, and the lucrative cultivation of yerba mate. Curitiba was made the capital, and Zacarias de Góis was named as the first president of the province.

Due to the small provincial population, an official European immigration program was initiated (mainly for the Polish, Germans, and Italians), which contributed to the expansion of colonization and the appearance of new economic activities. After the Republic was proclaimed (1889), the settlement of Paraná intensified, especially in the region of the fertile terra roxa soil in the north of the state. There, coffee farms and cities began to form on the slopes of the three rivers Paranapanema, Cinzas, and Jataí.

== Early times ==
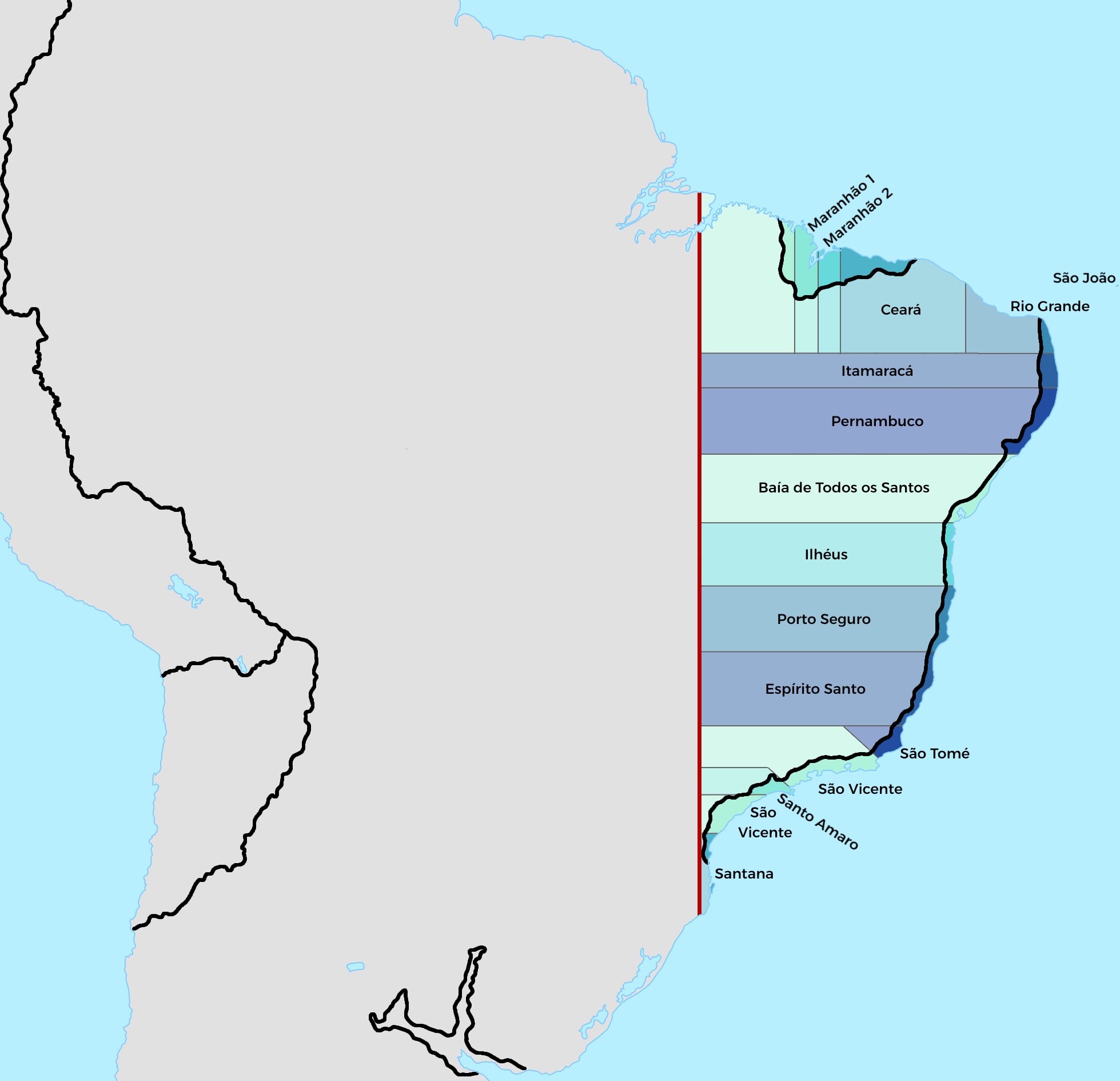
Captaincies of Brazil in 1534.

Until the mid-17th century, the southern coast of the São Vicente captaincy, which is now part of the state of Paraná, received sporadic visits from Europeans in search of hardwood. During the period of the Spanish rule, the Vicentenes were encouraged to make contact with the hydrographic basin of the Río de la Plata. The southern coast of Brazil was explored intermittently, motivating the search for indigenous people and minerals. In search of the former, the Paulistans went westward, while to the east, in the region where the cities of Paranaguá and Curitiba are now located, the latter was the main economic activity.

The legends in which the colonizers believed there were large deposits of gold and silver caused countless adventurers to be attracted to the region of Paranaguá. The Portuguese nobleman and military man Salvador Correia de Sá, who in 1613 would take over the superintendence of the mines of southern Brazil spent some time there, however, no ounce of gold was found. The viscount of Barbacena sent the Spaniard Rodrigo de Castelo Branco - who had profound knowledge about the deposits of Peru - to the mines of southern Brazil. In 1680, a letter was written to the Portuguese monarch reporting the disappointment with the mines.

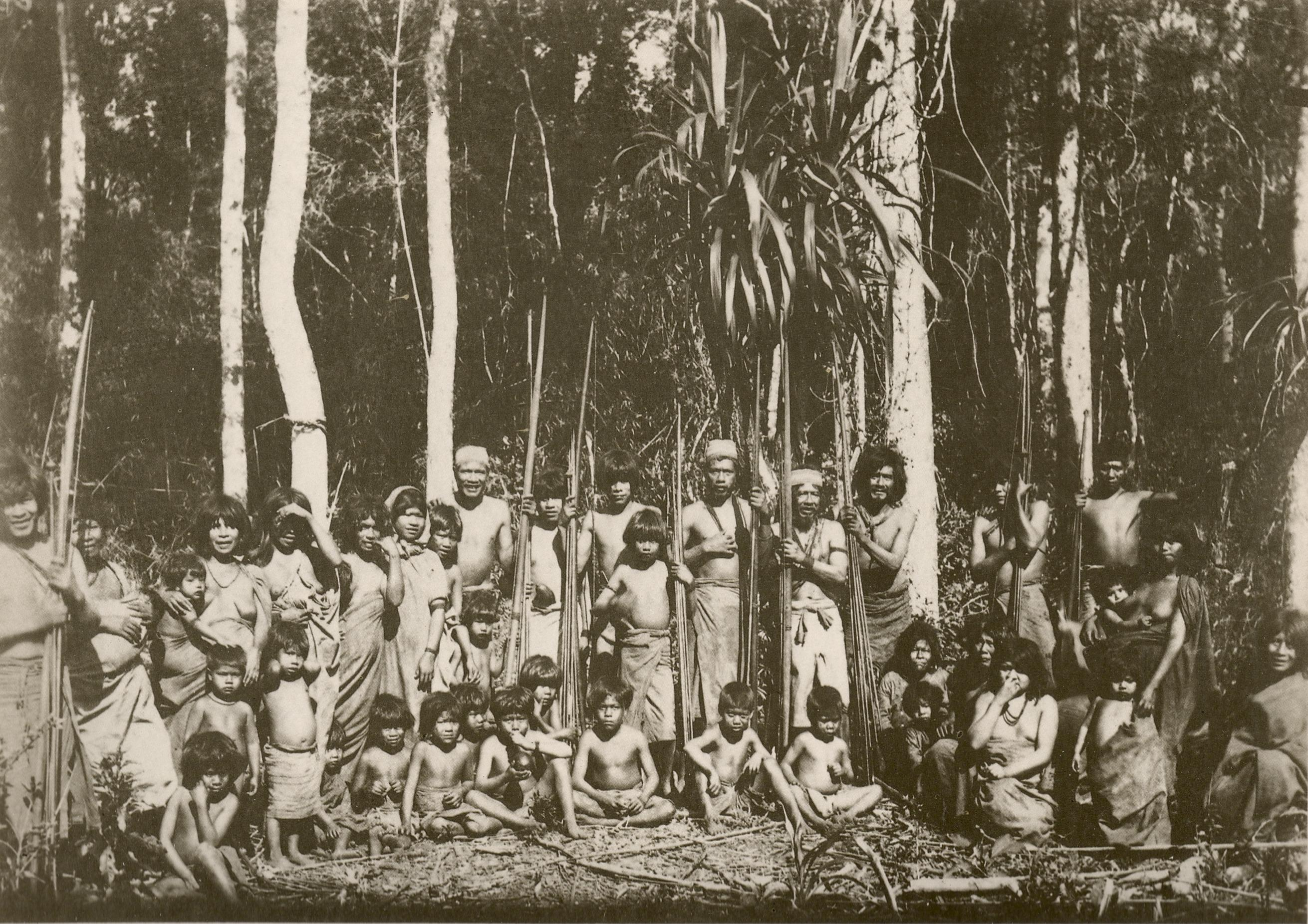
The Pai Tavytera in 1860 in Paraná. Paraná people owe the name of their state and many of its cities to the Indians.

In the last years of the 17th century, the dream of gold was left behind, and the work of extracting the alluvial gold was continued. The colonizers put the indigenous people to work in farming, wood extraction, and other services. The use of slaves from Africa began in the following century, and according to the 1798 census, the number of African slaves was relatively greater than that of Indians.

Paranaguá was elevated to the category of village by a royal charter dated July 29, 1648, and with it, the so-called fields of Curitiba formed only one community. Curitiba was elevated to the rank of village in 1693 and gradually became the most important urban center in Paraná. For this reason, the great cattle road was built, a transportation route established from Rio Grande do Sul to Sorocaba.

Castro was the first Paraná municipality, founded in 1778.

== Troop cycle ==
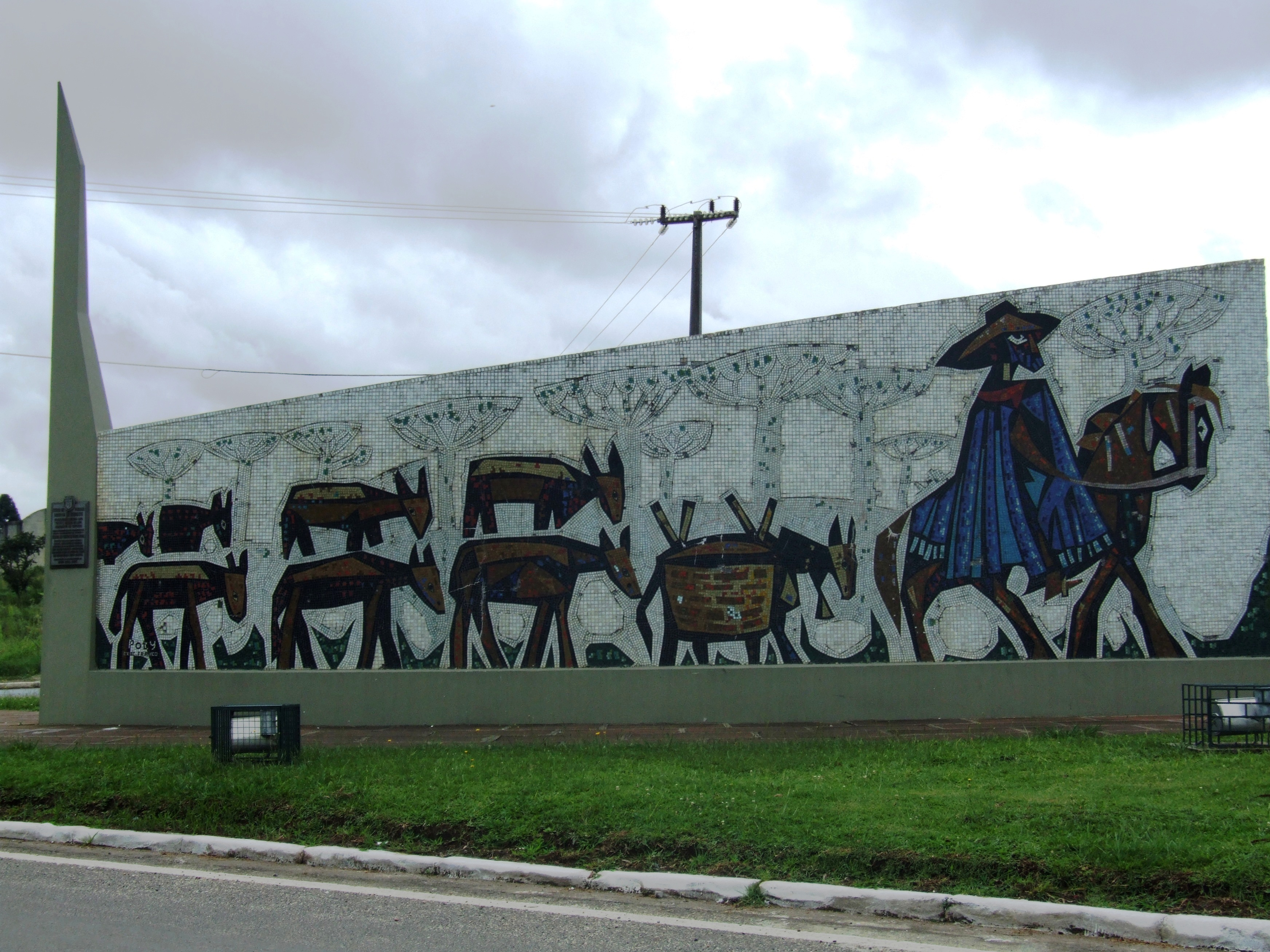
Monument to the tropeiro in the municipality of Lapa (PR).

The discovery of the gold mines of Minas Gerais had as one of its consequences the demand for horses and cattle, supplied with mules from the southern missions region. They were transported via the Viamão-Sorocaba road, which opened in 1731. According to Brasil Pinheiro Machado, the construction of this road was "a relevant event in Paraná's history". It disconnected Curitiba from the coastal cycle, socially distancing it from Paranaguá and incorporating it into the historical system of the frontier wars, giving it the opportunity for a march southward, northward, and westward, so that Curitiba came to signify the character of the entire region that would be the future province.

This was the beginning of the troop cycle in Paraná's history, which lasted until the 1870s, when the railroad transport era began. Many inhabitants dedicated themselves to the profitable business of buying mules in the south and reselling them in the Sorocaba fairs. It was essentially with the spread of breeding and wintering farms that the territory was occupied. Based on the ownership of pastures and the work of black and Indian slaves, the families that held regional power were established. Thanks to the troops that were established around rivers, municipalities such as Lapa, Ponta Grossa, and Castro emerged.

== Expansion of pastoral activity ==
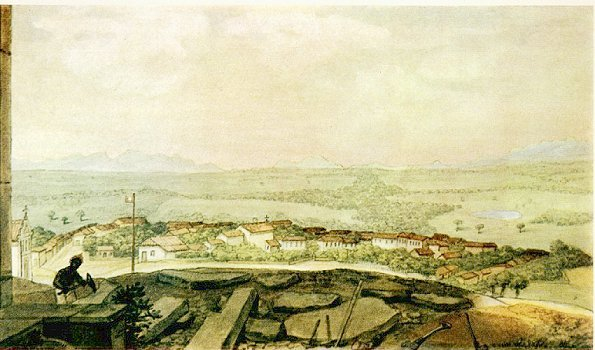
Panorama of Curitiba, in an engraving by Jean-Baptiste Debret, 1827.

In the early 19th century, with the upsurge of the war in the south, it became necessary as part of the Portuguese strategy to occupy the lands that belonged to Portugal according to the Treaty of Madrid, but had remained abandoned since the destruction of the Jesuit missions by the bandeirantes.

With the objectives of occupying the territory, subjugating the Indians, and opening the way to the missions, in June 1810 a military operation reached the fields of Guarapuava, which soon after were donated in sesmarias. (Note: Sesmaria was a plot of land distributed to a beneficiary, on behalf of the Portuguese crown, for the purpose of cultivating virgin lands.) The captured Indians were distributed "among the most well-to-do residents" and three decades later the region was occupied. It then became a matter of conquering the fields of Palmas from the Indians, which was done in 1839 by two rival private societies, which resorted to arbitration to avoid armed clashes. This was completed in the mid-nineteenth century, and thanks to pastoral activity, the fields of the countryside were also occupied.

== Province of Paraná ==
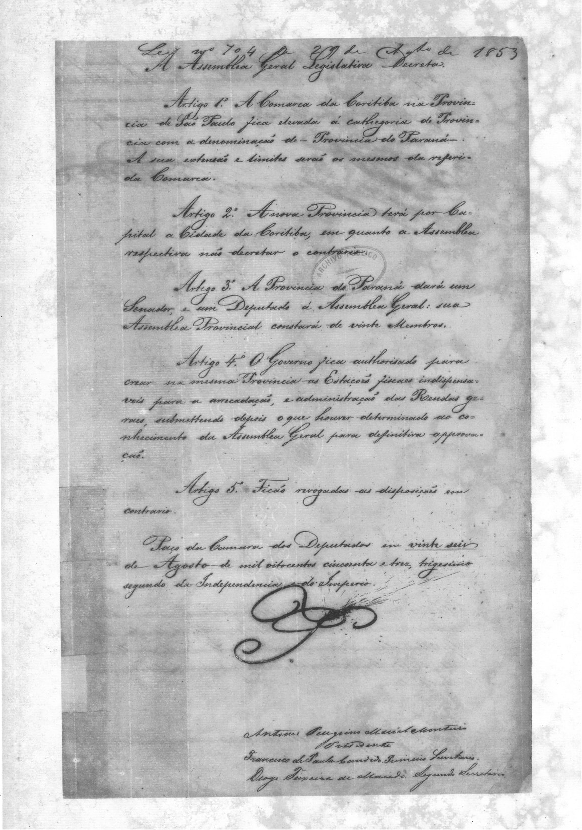
Facsimile of Imperial Law No. 704 of August 26, 1853, which gave autonomy to Paraná.

By a royal decree of February 19, 1811, the parish of Paranaguá and Curitiba was created, belonging to the Captaincy of São Paulo. On July 6 of the same year, the city council of Paranaguá addressed the prince regent to request the emancipation of the parish and the creation of a new captaincy. Ten years later, the movement called the Separatist Conjuration, led by Floriano Bento Viana, openly formulated its separatist claim, but without success.

Despite the political activity expressed in successive diligences and petitions aimed at political-administrative emancipation, and even after independence, the then-called "Parnanguaras" continued to be subjected to local troop commanders, since the provincial government was far away and lacked interest in those lands. The political and strategic importance of the region grew with the years and was evidenced by events that had repercussions at the national level, such as the Ragamuffin War and the liberal rebellions of 1842.

On May 29, 1843, the bill that elevated the comarca of Curitiba to the category of province caused debates in which the deputies from Minas Gerais and São Paulo stood out. According to the latter's deputies, the real reason for the creation of the new province, by the dismemberment of the São Paulo province, was to punish the latter for its participation in the liberal rebellions of 1842. At the same time, the Paraná economy, along with the cattle trade, swelled with the exportation of native yerba mate to the markets of the Plata and Chile. Promises of emancipation were made, while the fight in parliament continued. Finally, on August 28, 1853, the project for the province of Paraná was approved, which would have the city of Curitiba as provisional capital.

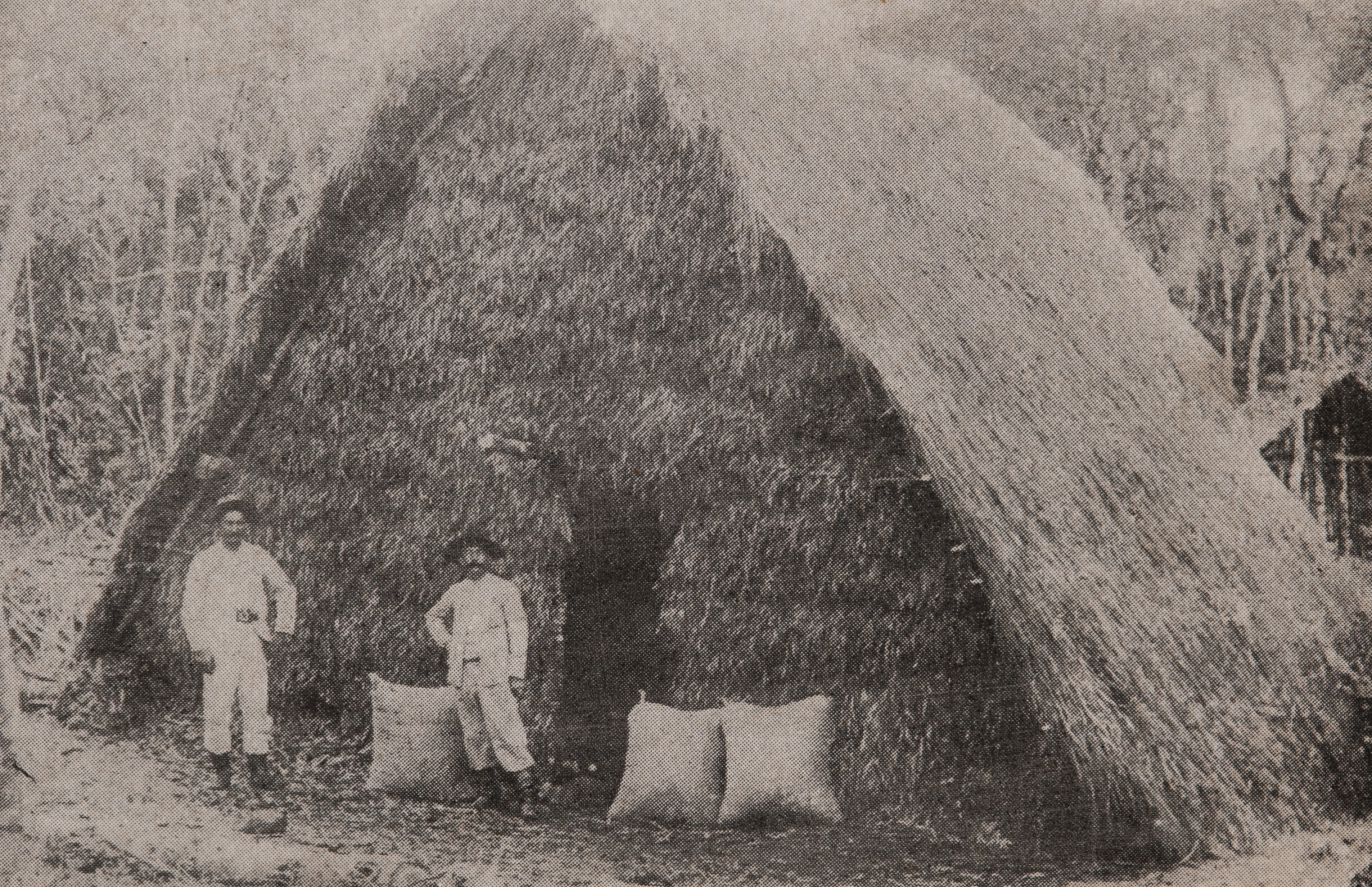
Yerba mate deposit.

On December 19 of the same year, Zacarias de Góis e Vasconcelos, the first president of the province, arrived in the capital. He immediately took measures to boost the local economy and obtain resources for the administrative actions that were necessary. He tried to direct part of the labor and capital that were employed in the preparation and trade of yerba mate to other activities, especially farming. The most profitable business of the province continued to be, however, the sale of mules to São Paulo. This activity reached its highest point in the 1860s and only declined at the end of the century.

During the provincial period, the government of Paraná did not achieve the necessary administrative continuity, since the presidency of the province, freely chosen by the central power, had 55 occupants in 36 years. The Paraná liberals were organized under the leadership of Jesuíno Marcondes and his brother-in-law Manuel Alves de Araújo, belonging to the family of the barons of Tibagi and Campos Gerais, at the time the most powerful oligarchy in the region. The conservatives were headed by Manuel Antônio Guimarães and Manuel Francisco Correia Júnior, from families that controlled the commerce of the coast.

== Crisis in pastoral society ==
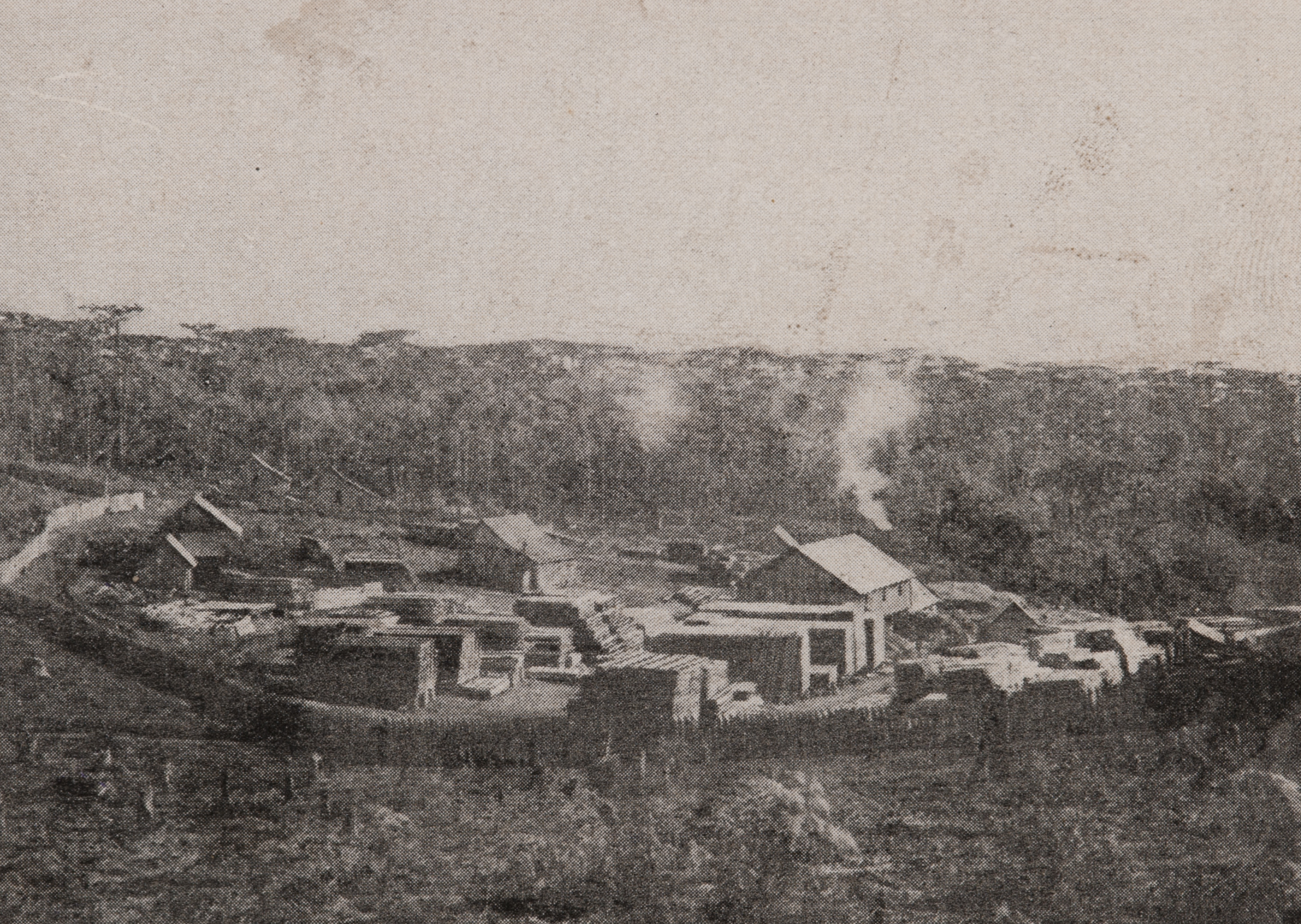
Sawmill in the forest.

The decline of the mule trade brought a crisis in the entire pastoral society of Paraná. The large undivided patrimony of the patriarchal family, which included several family nuclei, could no longer provide for the subsistence of all. Children of the farmers emigrated to the cities, to São Paulo and Rio Grande do Sul. Since the beginning of the 19th century, Paraná had been receiving immigrants, within the policy of filling the demographic voids. They were Azoreans, Germans, Swiss, and French, but in small numbers and without being able to prosper.

In the middle of that century, although it had a population of around sixty thousand inhabitants, Paraná remained, from a human point of view, a desert irregularly interrupted by nineteen small oases situated at great distances from each other, as besides the "historical roads", there was nothing that could be considered a network These nineteen oases were represented by the two municipalities Curitiba and Paranaguá; the seven villas Guaratuba, Antonina, Morretes, São José dos Pinhais, Lapa, Castro, and Guarapuava; and the six freguesias (parishes) of Campo Largo, Palmeira, Ponta Grossa, Jaguariaíva, Tibagi, and Rio Negro; and the four chapels of Guaraqueçaba, Iguaçu, Votuverava, and Palmas. The population of the villages, parishes, and chapels generally ranged between one thousand and five thousand inhabitants, which means the effective density in the incipient urban centers was much higher than the statistical average (0.3 persons per square kilometer). On the other hand, in most of the territory, the emptiness was absolute. They were the general fields (Campos Gerais), the forest, and the Serra do Mar.

At the end of the 19th century, Paraná's economic prosperity was boosted again when the railroads were established since this enabled the wood industry to grow, as the Araucaria forests to the ports, such as Paranaguá, and São Paulo were connected by certain railroads. At the same time, mule transport disappeared, causing a crisis in the pastoral society.

== Colonization ==
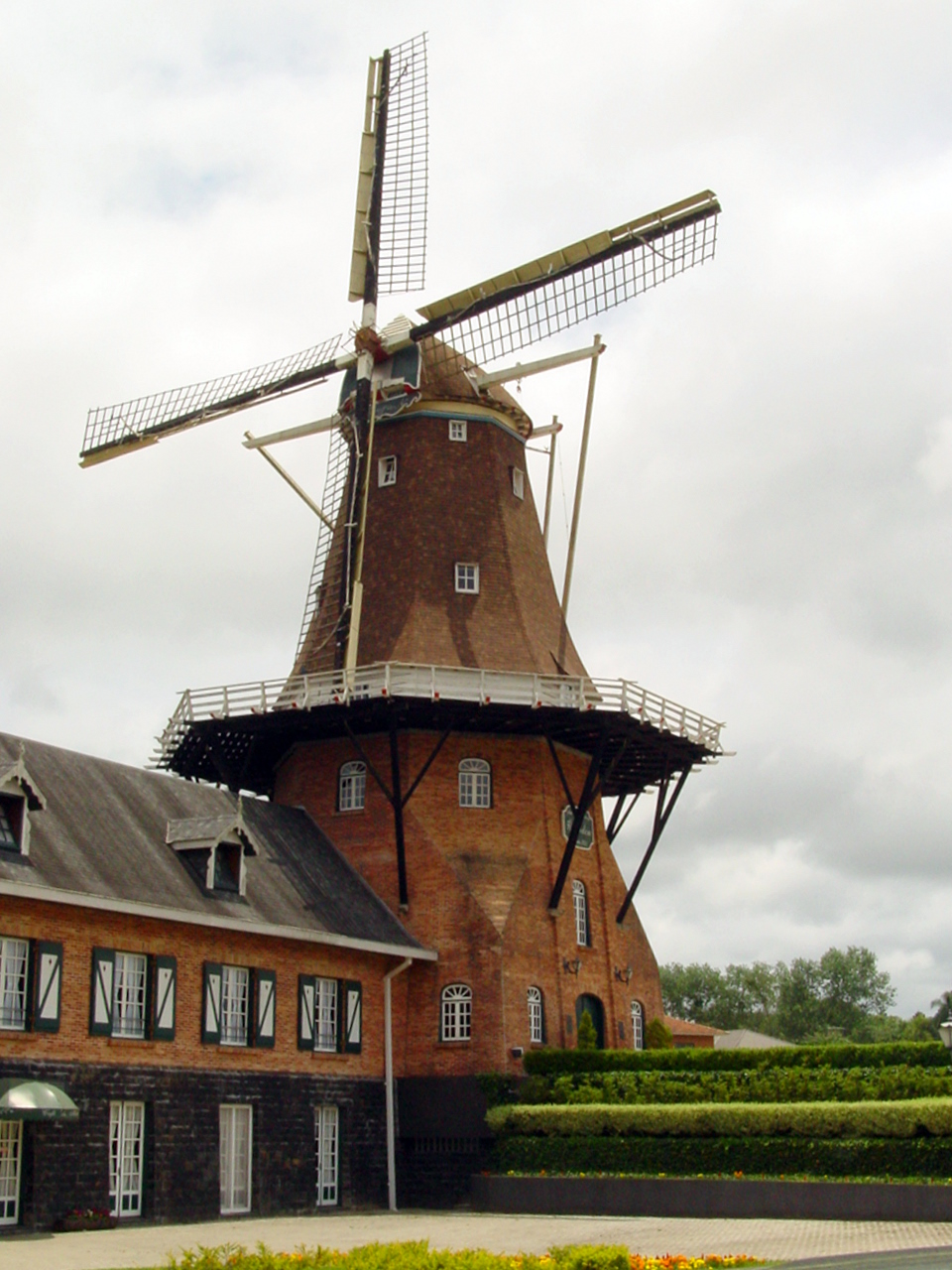
De Immigrant (The Immigrant), Dutch-style mill in the Dutch colony of Castrolanda in Castro.

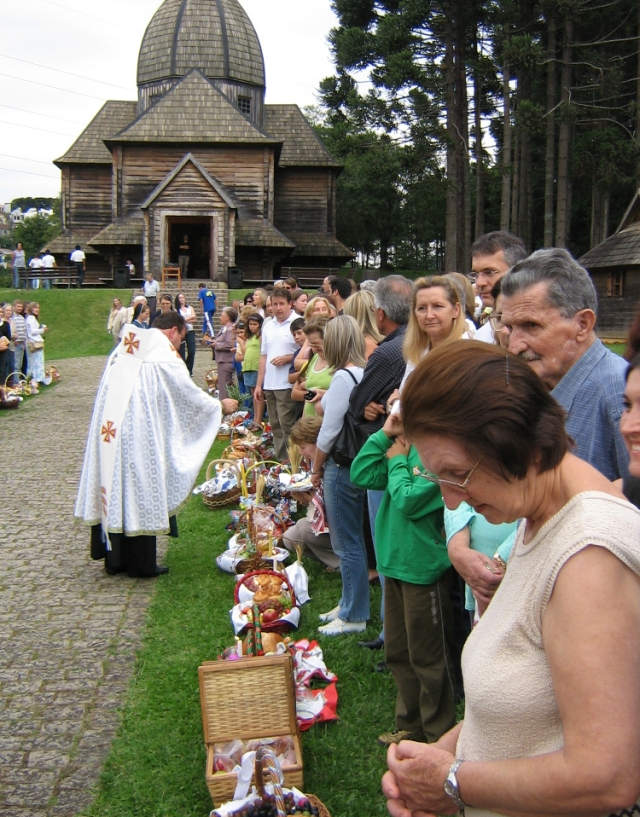
Ukrainian descendants at the food blessing ceremony on Easter Eve 2006 in Curitiba.

In the second half of the 19th century, colonization was stimulated for the creation of an agriculture that would supply the needs of the population. Joint measures by the imperial and provincial governments allowed the establishment of colonial nuclei near the urban centers, especially on the plateau of Curitiba, consisting of Poles, Germans, Italians, and, in smaller groups, Swiss, French and English. These contingents of immigrants have imprinted the ethnic physiognomy of Paraná. In some places, such as the municipality of Castro and its surroundings, only Dutch is spoken and in other regions of the state German, Italian, Ukrainian, Polish and Japanese are spoken.

The number of slaves decreased significantly from the middle of the century, mainly due to the sale or leasing to other provinces. A report by the president of Paraná in 1867 noted that the tax collected on slaves going to São Paulo "was almost equal to the tax on animals."

The coming of settlers thus attended to the problem, aggravated by the evasion of slave labor, and the scarcity of agricultural products. In the last decades of the 19th century, the construction of railroads and telegraph lines employed settlers brought by immigration societies. In this period and at the beginning of the 20th century, more than forty colonial nuclei were established in Paraná.

== Republic ==
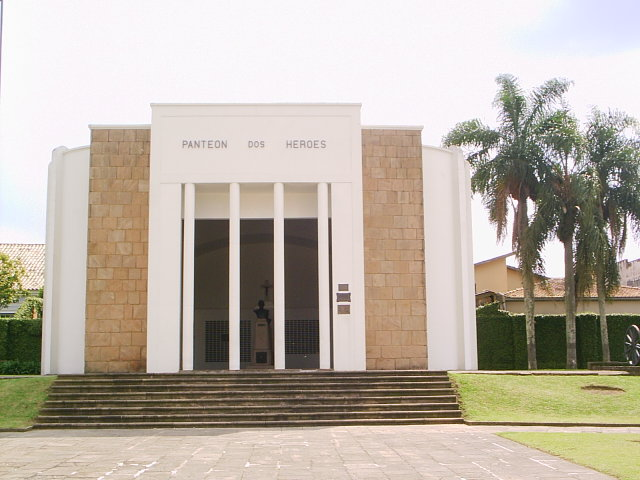
Panteon dos Heroes, monument to the legalists who fought in the Siege of Lapa.

Since the manifesto of 1870, demonstrations of sympathy for the republic had occurred sporadically in Paraná. Despite the founding of the newspapers Livre Paraná ("Freed Paraná"), in Paranaguá, and A República ("The Republic"), in Curitiba, and the creation of republican clubs in the two municipalities, the movement did not advance. Some Paraná citizens stood out in the republican campaign, but outside the province. In the Provincial Assembly, the republicans had only one deputy, Vicente Machado da Silva Lima, elected by the Liberal Party, and who was a prominent figure in the first years of the new regime.

The state suffered the consequences of the various political crises that marked the early days of the republic and had its state constitution promulgated only in April 1892, which was in force until the victory of the revolutionary movement of 1930. The Federalists abandoned the state, and a reckoning took place. The "picapaus" then took over and unleashed repression against the "maragatos". Despite eventual conciliations, such division lasted until 1930.

Map of Paraná, 1934. National Archives.

The province of Paraná was to have the same boundaries as the old comarca, causing a complicated border issue with Santa Catarina (since the discovery and occupation of the fields of Palmas) that lasted until the second decade of the 20th century. Based on a royal charter of 1749, Santa Catarina considered the "sertão" that corresponded to the coast as belonging to them, while Paraná relied on the principle of uti possidetis. With the republic, both states would compete over lands in the same territory.

Santa Catarina won a case in the Federal Supreme Court three times, but Paraná embargoed the decisions. It was in this area that the Contestado campaign was to be fought. Finally, in 1916, by an arbitrary decision of the president of the republic, the disputed region was partitioned, bringing the matter to an end.

== Agrarian issues ==
In 1920, Paraná ranked 13th in population in Brazil, with about 700,000 inhabitants; by 1960, the state had moved to fifth place, with more than 4.2 million inhabitants. This increase was due not only to natural growth, but to intense internal migratory waves, by which inhabitants from other states moved to previously uncultivated areas of Paraná. Since the 1920s, the spontaneous occupation had occurred by settlers from Rio Grande do Sul and Santa Catarina, usually descendants of Germans and Italians.

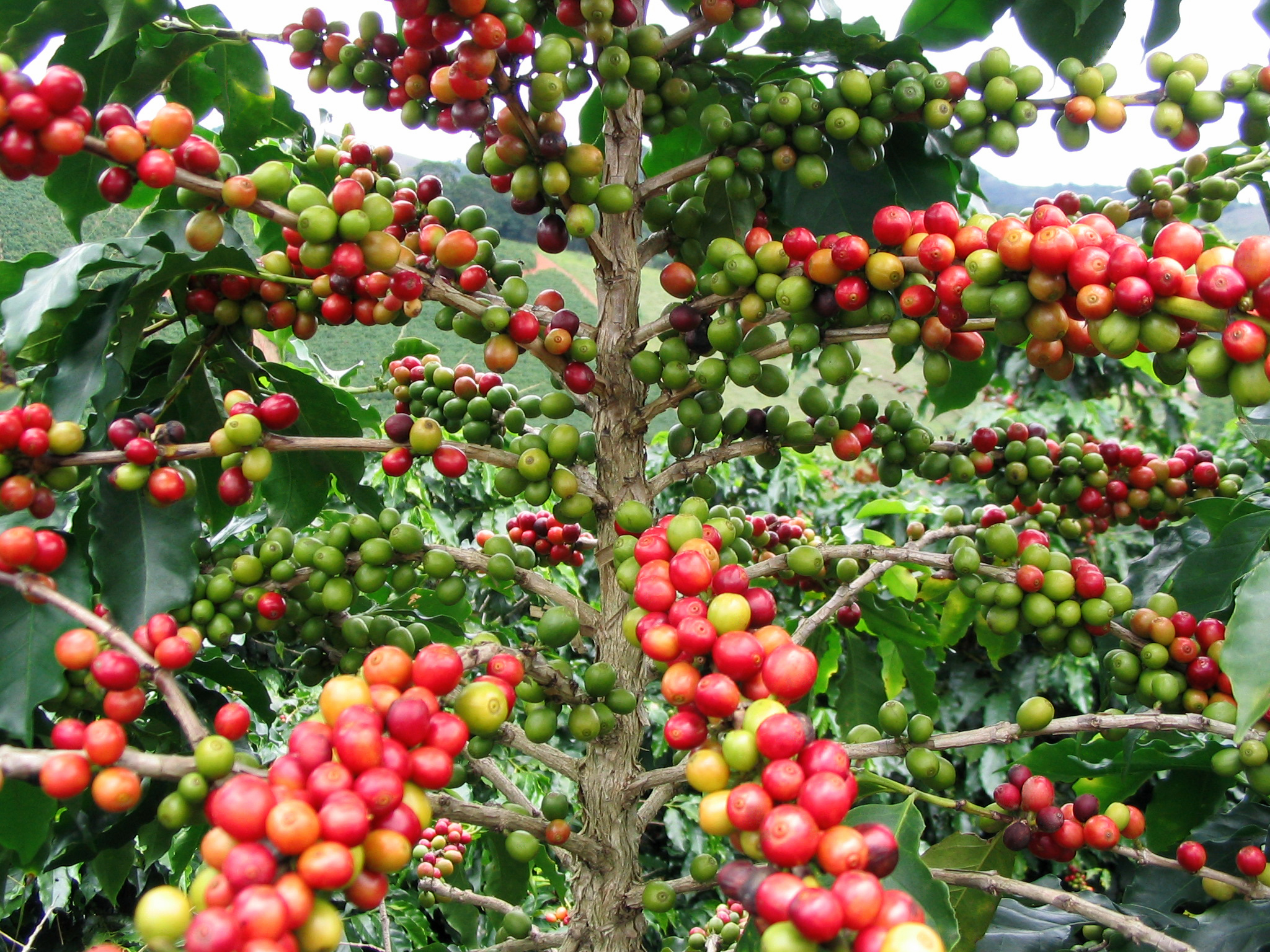
Coffee cultivation boosted the growth of Northern Paraná.

Since the end of the 19th century, farmers from São Paulo and Minas Gerais began to form coffee farms in the north of the state, rich in fertile land, with soil known as "terra roxa". There were also new waves of immigrant settlers, and with the experience of similar ventures in Australia and Africa, in 1924, Lord Lovat visited Paraná and three years later obtained a concession from the government for 500,000 bushels of land in the north of the state. He then founded Paraná Plantation Ltd. which, alongside the Companhia de Terras do Norte do Paraná and the Companhia Ferroviária do Norte do Paraná, executed the plan to colonize the area. In the region of the Iguazu and Paraná rivers, the forests had long been exploited by companies that traded in wood and mate. The axis of the operation was Londrina, which from then on grew at a fast pace.

After the revolution of 1930, when numerous land concessions were annulled, the state government and private individuals began organized occupation, directed toward varied agriculture and the raising of small animals.

== Revolution of 1930 and intervention ==
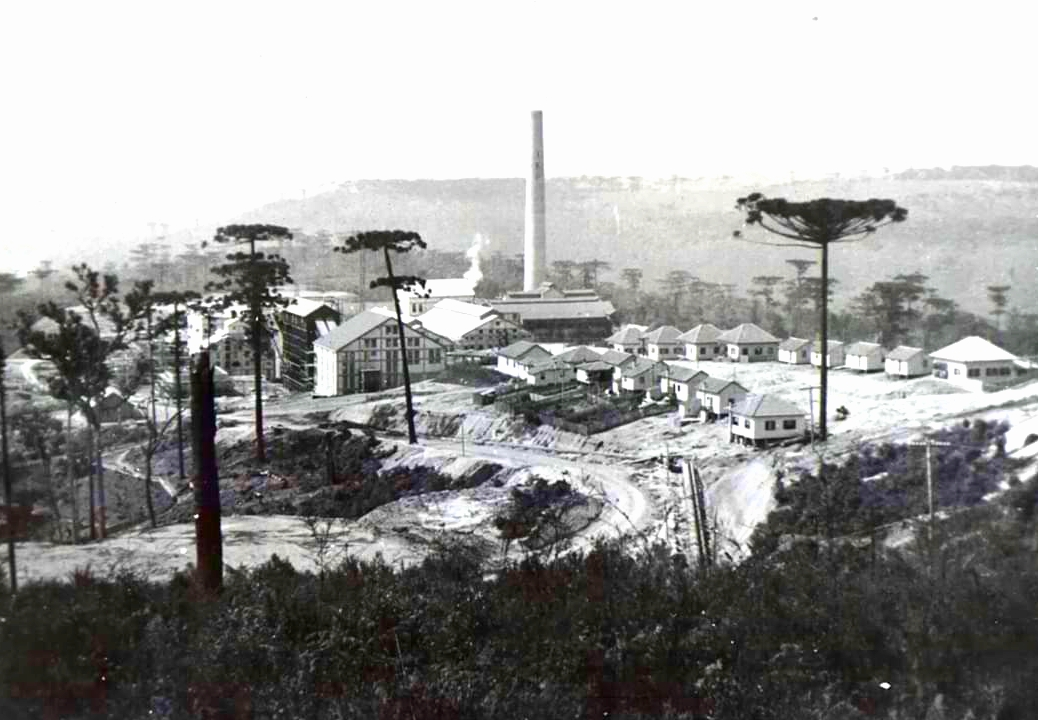
Klabin's Monte Alegre Plant, a paper mill in Telêmaco Borba, in the 1940s.

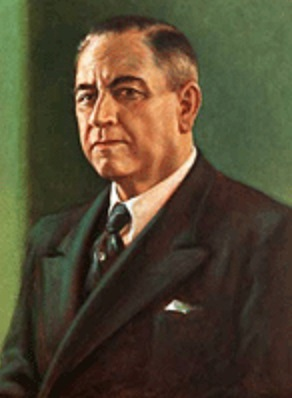
Manuel Ribas, federal intervinor from 1932 to 1945.

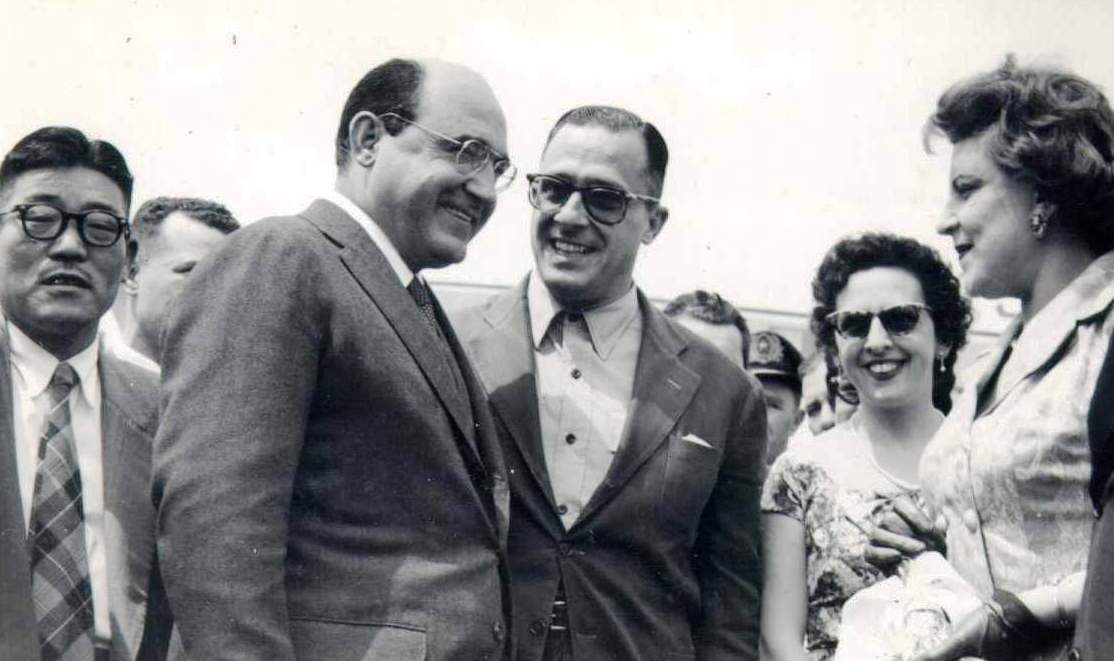
The then governor of Paraná Moysés Lupion and CMNP Director Hermann Morais de Barros in the 1950s.

The revolution broke out in October 1930, and on the 5th of the same month its supporters, with the help of military forces, took over the state government of Paraná, installed a provisional government, and replaced the authorities in the countryside. The revolutionaries of 1930, who placed Getúlio Vargas as president of Brazil, did not face resistance in Paraná. The state's public finances were in complete disequilibrium and the economy was in crisis.

General Mário Tourinho, the first acting governor, was replaced in the government by Manuel Ribas. The latter, elected in 1935, was confirmed as acting governor by the Estado Novo in 1937 and remained in office until 1945. During Vargas' administration, Manuel Ribas was a strong ally, who was highlighted for carrying out important works such as the re-equipment of the Port of Paranaguá, the installation of Klabin's paper mill, the Cerne Road, as well as roads connecting cities in the state and the improvement of education, health, and other areas. Ribas also allowed the creation of the Federal Territory of Iguaçu, dismembering the west and southwest of Paraná. In 1943, Vargas visited the construction sites of Klabin's paper mill, Monte Alegre Plant, in Telêmaco Borba, and in 1946 the mill began operations. In 1953, he returned to Paraná to inaugurate the Presidente Vargas Hydroelectric Plant, built and run by Klabin.

At the end of the 1950s, the Colonos Revolt (or Revolt of the Posseiros) occurred, in which settlers repudiated the problems of colonization of the southwestern region, establishing conflicts between the "posseiros" and the "grileiras" land companies, and the federal and state governments. Then emerged the figure of the "posseiro", who tended to settle on land he considered state-owned or ownerless. Multiple sales, buying from the "non-owner", and large-scale "grilagem" companies also began to occur. By the 1960s, all the land in Paraná was occupied. These agrarian conflicts and struggles lasted throughout the second half of the 20th century, without any lasting solution amidst the advances of the economy and society.

== Progress and its problems ==
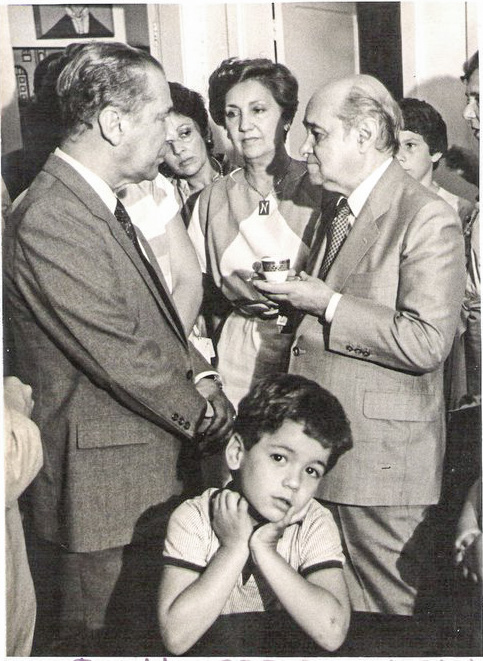
Tancredo Neves and Ney Braga in the 1980s. Braga was governor of Paraná and president of Itaipu Binacional.

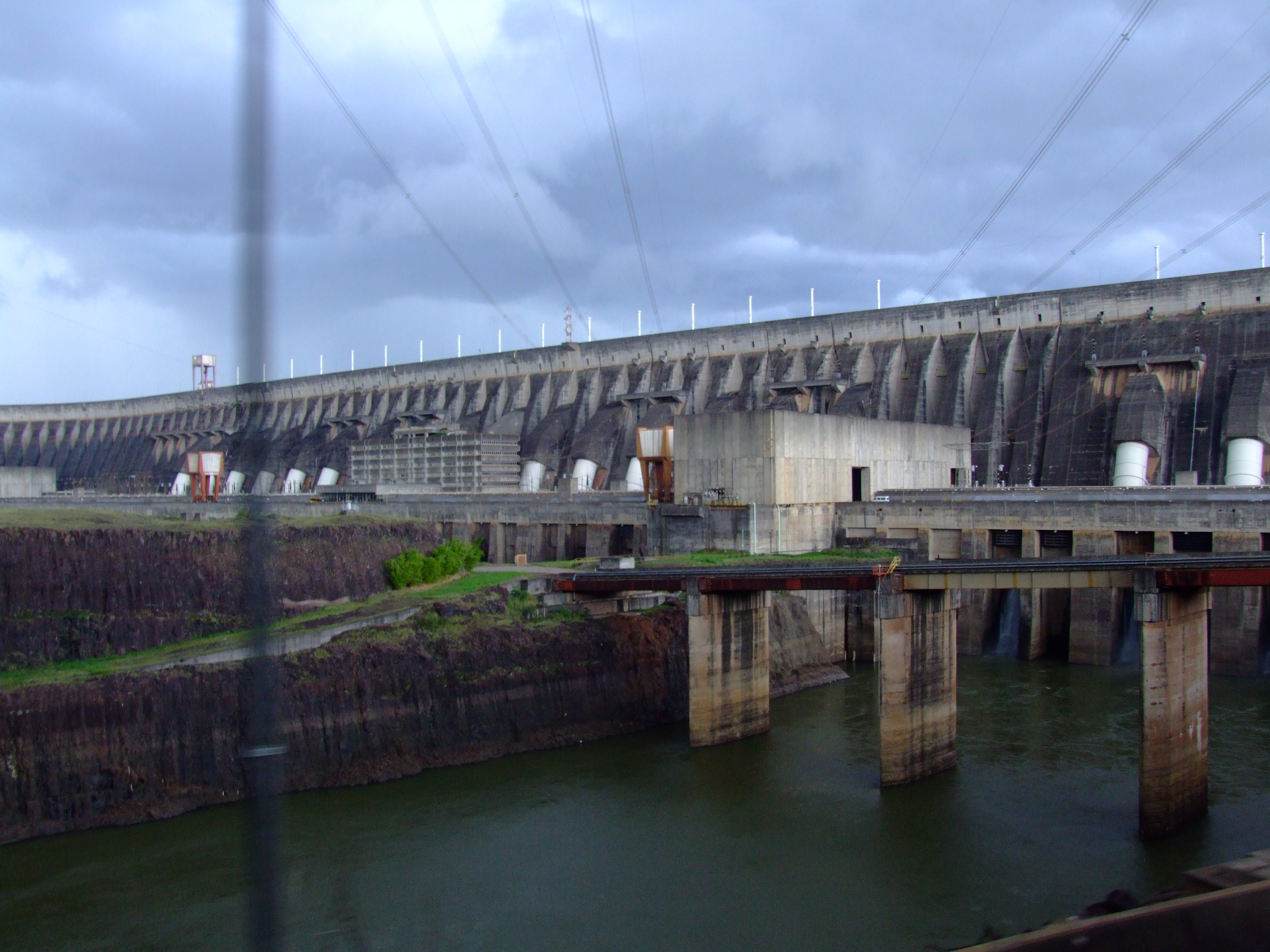
Itaipu Dam, the second largest in the world and one of the seven wonders of the modern world.

As the state government sought to make Paraná the agricultural hub of the country and a wood producer capable of carrying out extensive reforestation, land conflicts not only continued but grew in intensity. Hundreds of thousands of small landowners and landless workers staged a rural exodus that caused a demographic emptying in more than fifty municipalities. Such emigrants went mainly to the Midwest and the Amazon, taking their productive capacities with them.

In the early 1960s, Paraná suffered greatly from drought, dry weather, and frosts. In this period, the state concentrated about 50% of the national coffee production. In all, there were 1.8 million hectares of coffee, with an average of 20 million sacks harvested. In 1963, Paraná was hit by one of the largest wildfires in Brazil in the 20th century. The fire burned about 10% of the state's territory, 8,000 properties in 128 municipalities and killed more than 100 people. As a result, Paraná began a fire prevention strategy by creating a model monitoring alert system. It also began the diversification of crops in agriculture that was only intensified after 1975, including the mechanization of the field.

Also in the 1960s, the Figueira Thermal Power Station went into operation, being the only thermoelectric plant located in the state that relies solely on coal. The initiative aimed to supply the demand for energy in the region and to exploit the coal mines in Paraná's main coal basin.

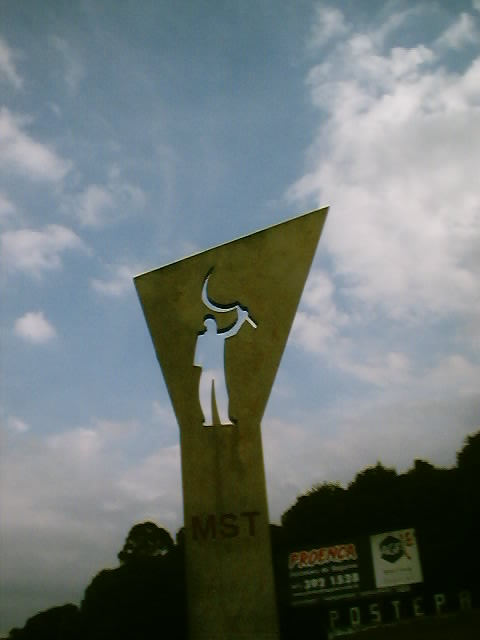
Monument erected in the state of Paraná in honor of the workers of the MST (Landless Workers Movement). Designer by the architect Oscar Niemeyer.

The year of 1975 was marked by a tragedy in Paraná's history. During the winter an intense mass of polar air reached the state, The state registered extremely low temperatures that year, including an intense snowfall in Curitiba. In the early morning of July 18, 1975, the phenomenon known as "black frost" occurred (an atmospheric condition that causes the internal part of the plant, the sap, to freeze), leaving the plant burnt and dead. The consequences for agriculture were devastating, decimating crops, especially the entire coffee production. For the state's economy, it caused major losses and an economic recession in Paraná.

In the 1960s and 1970s, soybean increased its agricultural area by thirty percent, replacing other crops such as coffee. The industry also began to make significant leaps, with the installation of a bus and truck plant in Curitiba in 1976, and the start-up of the Presidente Getúlio Vargas refinery in 1977. The first major improvements that made the capital of Paraná a model of new urbanistic solutions were also made at this time: The first part of the city's bicycle lanes was inaugurated and the express bus system appeared.

However, land disputes increased, even in indigenous reserves, as well as complaints of serious environmental disturbances caused by the growing number of dams to build hydroelectric power plants on the Iguazu, Paranapanema, Capivari, and Paraná rivers. In 1980, the soybean harvest reached a record of 2,079 kg per hectare, higher than the North American mark until then, while the wheat harvest placed Paraná in first place nationally, with 57% of the entire country's production.

In 1982, the disappearance of the Guaíra falls, imposed by the need to form the huge reservoir of the Itaipu dam, provoked an intense protest movement. The land issue was also worsening, with attacks and demonstrations by landless workers.

== Stability and development ==
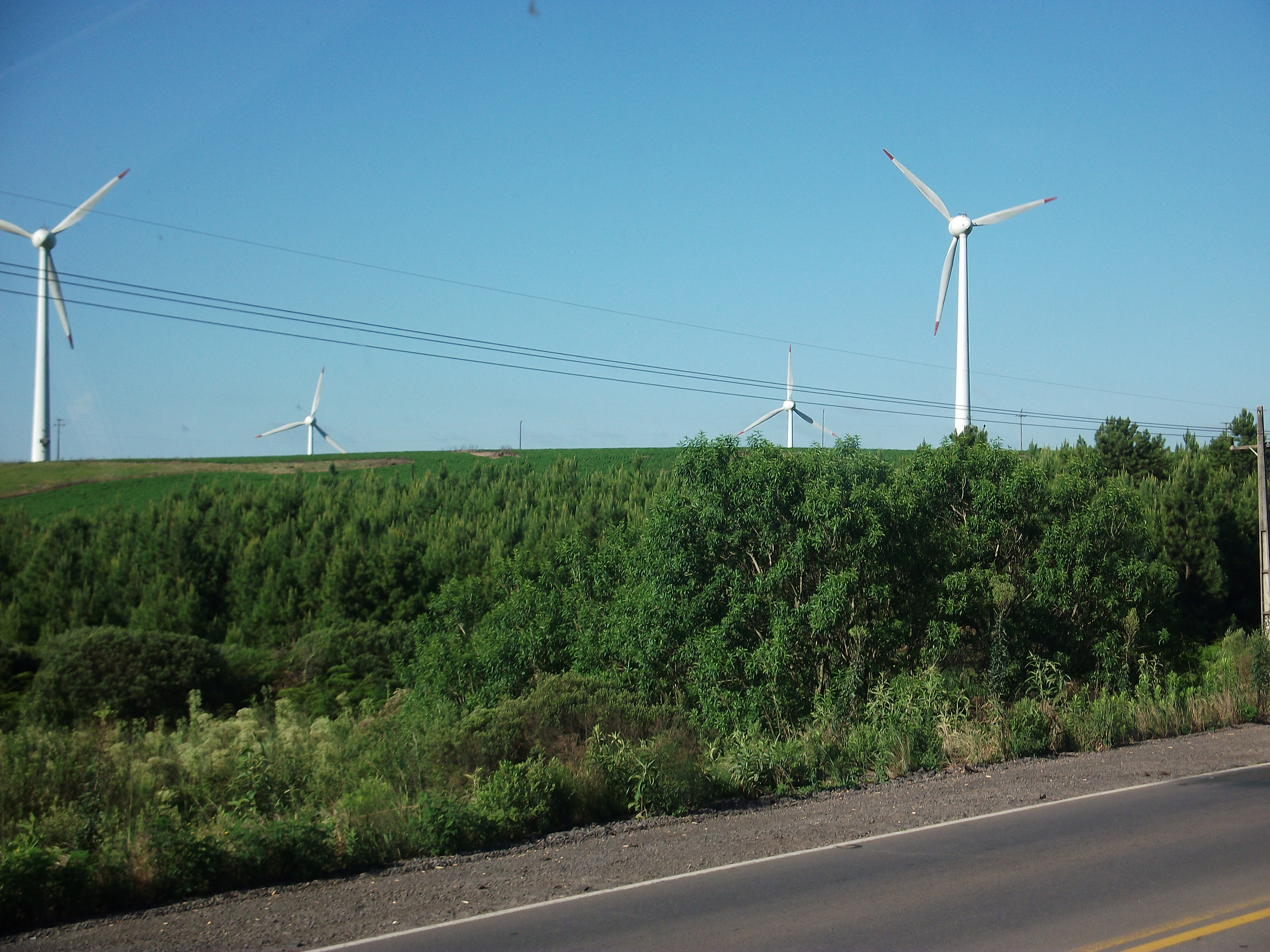
Wind turbines at the Palmas wind farm.

Paraná is a state that attracts investments, a position favored by the opening of the local economy towards Mercosur. With the population growth stabilized in the last three decades, the economy has been modernized and diversified in both the agricultural and industrial sectors. There is energy self-sufficiency guaranteed by the Itaipu hydroelectric plant and an efficient export pole in Paranaguá.

Despite attracting investments, the state ended the year of 1997 with a deficit of more than 1 million reais. As a consequence, public works were paralyzed and the government, bankrupt, was unable to honor its commitments. Among the main causes of the crisis were the high interest rates and the reduction in tax collection as well as the increase in civil service salaries. In November 1999, the Palmas wind farm was inaugurated, the first power plant of its kind in the southern region of the country.

== Political change ==
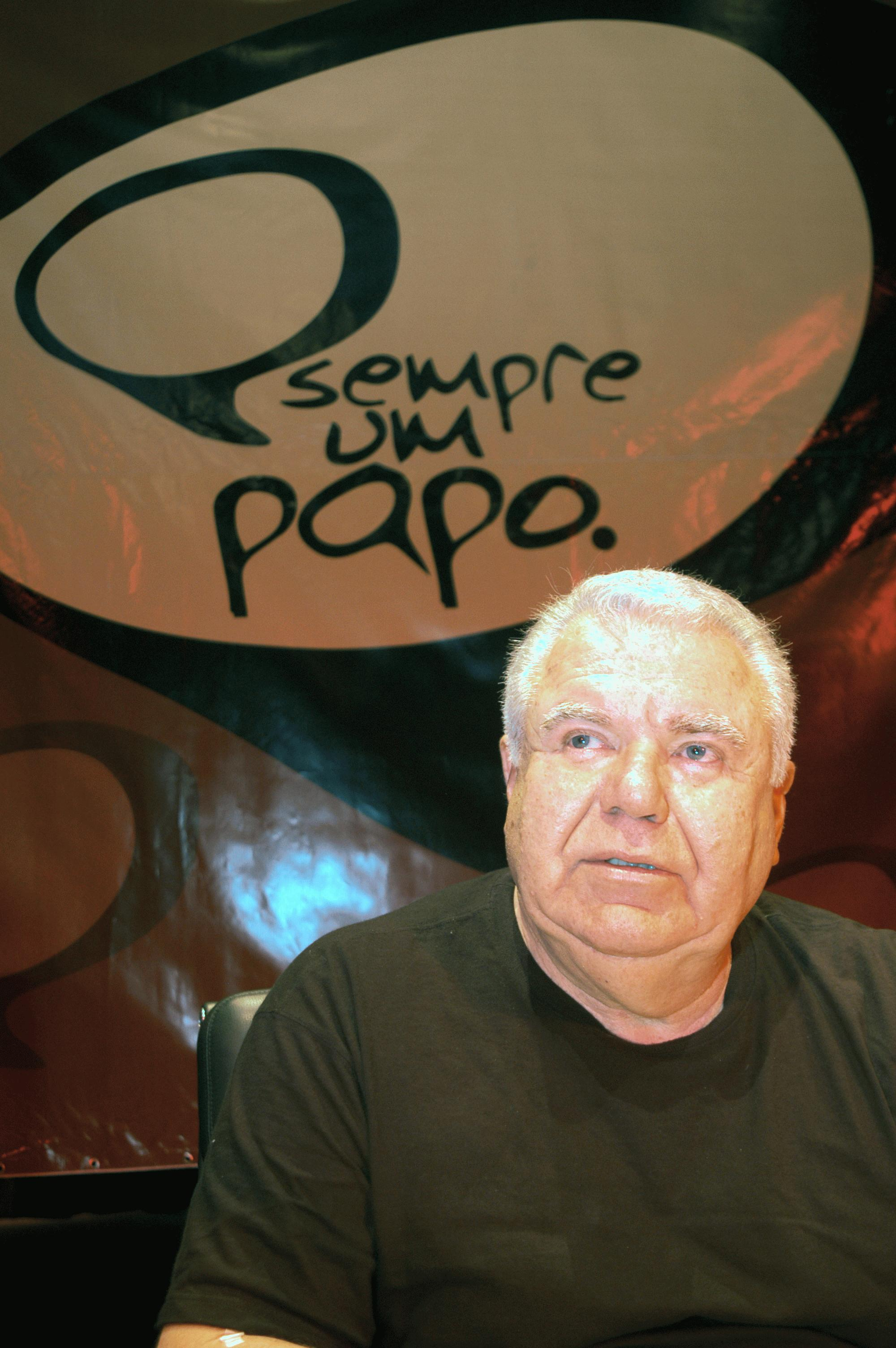
Jaime Lerner, Brazilian urban planner and architect, governed Paraná from 1995 to 2003.

Before 1961, Paraná was politically controlled by Moisés Lupion, twice governor. Lupion was succeeded by Ney Braga, a friend of the military, who also held the post twice. Chosen by popular vote in the 1982 elections, José Richa was governor of the state before 1986. Then came elected governors Álvaro Dias (1987-1991) and Roberto Requião (since 1991). Requião remained in office until April 1994, when he was succeeded by Mário Pereira, who completed his term. In 1994, Jaime Lerner was elected, taking office in January 1995, with Emília Belinati as vice-governor (the first woman vice-governor of Paraná and the first to temporarily take over the Iguaçu Palace). In the 1998 elections, they were re-elected.

In 1998, Jaime Lerner, left his party and joined the PFL, taking along the mayor of Curitiba, Cássio Taniguchi, five state deputies, and most of the government's secretaries. Among the reasons for leaving was the lack of support from the party for the governor's possible candidacy for reelection. In 2000, he privatized the Paraná State Bank (Banestado), in line with the privatization policy of Fernando Henrique Cardoso's PSDB government. In 2001, the governor presented a privatization bill for the Paraná Electric Company (Copel), which was rejected by the Paraná Legislative Assembly (ALEP) due to popular pressure. Lerner granted the minority shareholder group Dominó control of the Paraná Sanitation Company (Sanepar), which was also being prepared for privatization. He created a series of Public-Private Law Organizations as a mechanism to privatize public service. Jaime Lerner made suspicious contracts in the area of public IT, having more than 450 million reais of contracts broken by the subsequent government, without any action against the state for the breach of contract.

== 21st century ==
Requião won the elections in 2002, taking office in 2003. Following demands from the European market, in 2003 the government of Paraná created a law prohibiting the planting, marketing, and transport of genetically modified seeds. The Supreme Federal Court (STF), however, ruled the law unconstitutional and allowed the planting of transgenics. But the government maintained the embargo on the flow of transgenic crops through the port of Paranaguá.

In 2005, the Biosafety Law was sanctioned, which determined the creation of a National Technical Commission on Biosafety (CNTBio) to regulate the use of transgenics. In 2006, an injunction granted by the Federal Court allowed the shipment of genetically modified soy through Paranaguá. Data from the Brazilian Association of Seeds and Seedlings (Abrasem) revealed that the rate of modified soy seeds in the state's 2008/2009 harvest was of 44% . In October 2008, the Swiss multinational Syngenta Seeds donated their farm in western Paraná to the state government. It was a site occupied by the Landless Rural Workers Movement (MST) and was to be used by the government as an experimental center for agroecology.

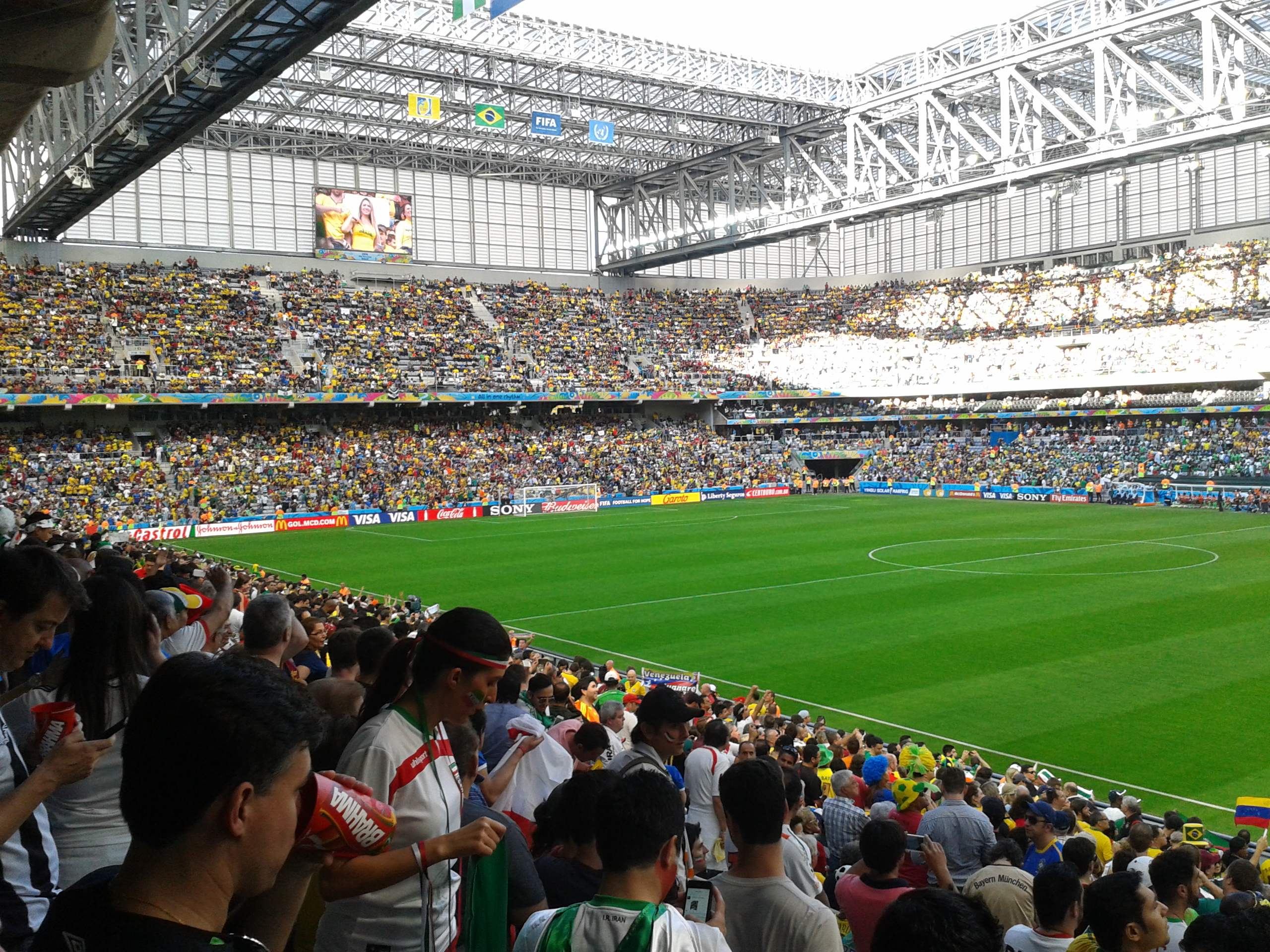
Arena da Baixada during the 2014 FIFA World Cup Iran-Nigeria match.

Requião remained in office until September 2006, when he left to run for reelection. Hermas Brandão, president of the Legislative Assembly of Paraná, took over as interim president. In 2007, Requião returned to the government after being reelected in 2006. In the 2008 elections, the mayor of Curitiba, Beto Richa (PSDB), José Richa's son, was re-elected with 77.27% of the votes. In November 2009, the STF suspended the appointment of Maurício Requião as a councillor of the State Audit Court (TCE). The STF considered it nepotism.

Richa left the mayorship of Curitiba in early 2010 to run for state government, and his vice-president Luciano Ducci (PSB) took over. Requião resigned to run for the Federal Senate, and his vice-president Orlando Pessuti took over and completed his term. In October, Richa was elected governor in the first round of voting. Also in 2010, the State Public Prosecutor's Office denounced a scheme of embezzlement of around R$100 million from ALEP, with the appointment of ghost employees during 16 years, from 1994 to 2009. Fifty employees allegedly participated in the scheme, including the former director of the Assembly, Abib Miguel, who was arrested.

Curitiba hosted the 2014 FIFA World Cup games at Club Athletico Paranaense's stadium, the Joaquim Américo Guimarães, known as Arena da Baixada. It was renovated at an estimated cost of 184.6 million reais.

In 2014, Klabin began the largest private investment ever recorded in the state of Paraná, with an initial contribution of 5.8 billion reais, totaling 21.4 billion reais over ten years. In the same year, Beto Richa was re-elected and continued as governor until April 2018, when he was succeeded by Cida Borghetti, who completed the term. She became the first woman to take over as governor of Paraná after Beto Richa's resignation. Borghetti governed the state from April 6, 2018, until January 1, 2019. The current head of the Paraná executive is Ratinho Júnior, elected in 2018, who took office on January 1, 2019, with Darci Piana as his vice-governor.

== See also ==
- History of Brazil
- List of governors of Paraná

== Bibliography ==
- Civita, Roberto (1999). Almanaque Abril (in Portuguese). São Paulo: Abril.
- Wachowicz, Ruy Christovam (2010). História do Paraná (in Portuguese) (10th ed.). Editora UEPG.
