= Saul Raiz =

Brazilian politician and engineer (1930–2021)

Mayor of Curitiba
- In office 15 March 1975 – 15 March 1979
- Preceded by: Donato Gulin
- Succeeded by: Jaime Lerner

Secretary of Municipal Development of Paraná
- In office 1981–1982

Secretary of Transport and Public Works of Paraná state
- In office February 1, 1966 – May 29, 1967

Director General of the Department of Roads and Highways
- In office 1961–1965

Personal details
- Born: 19 January 1930; Curitiba, Brazil
- Died: 3 December 2021 (aged 91); Curitiba, Brazil
- Political party: ARENA (1965–1979); PDS (1980–1985); DEM (1985–2011); PSD (2011–2021)

Saul Raiz (19 January 1930 – 3 December 2021) was a Brazilian politician Paraná. He served as the Mayor of Curitiba from 1975 to 1979.

== Biography ==
A member of the National Renewal Alliance, he served as Mayor of Curitiba from 1975 to 1979.
