= Rafael Greca =

Brazilian engineer and politician

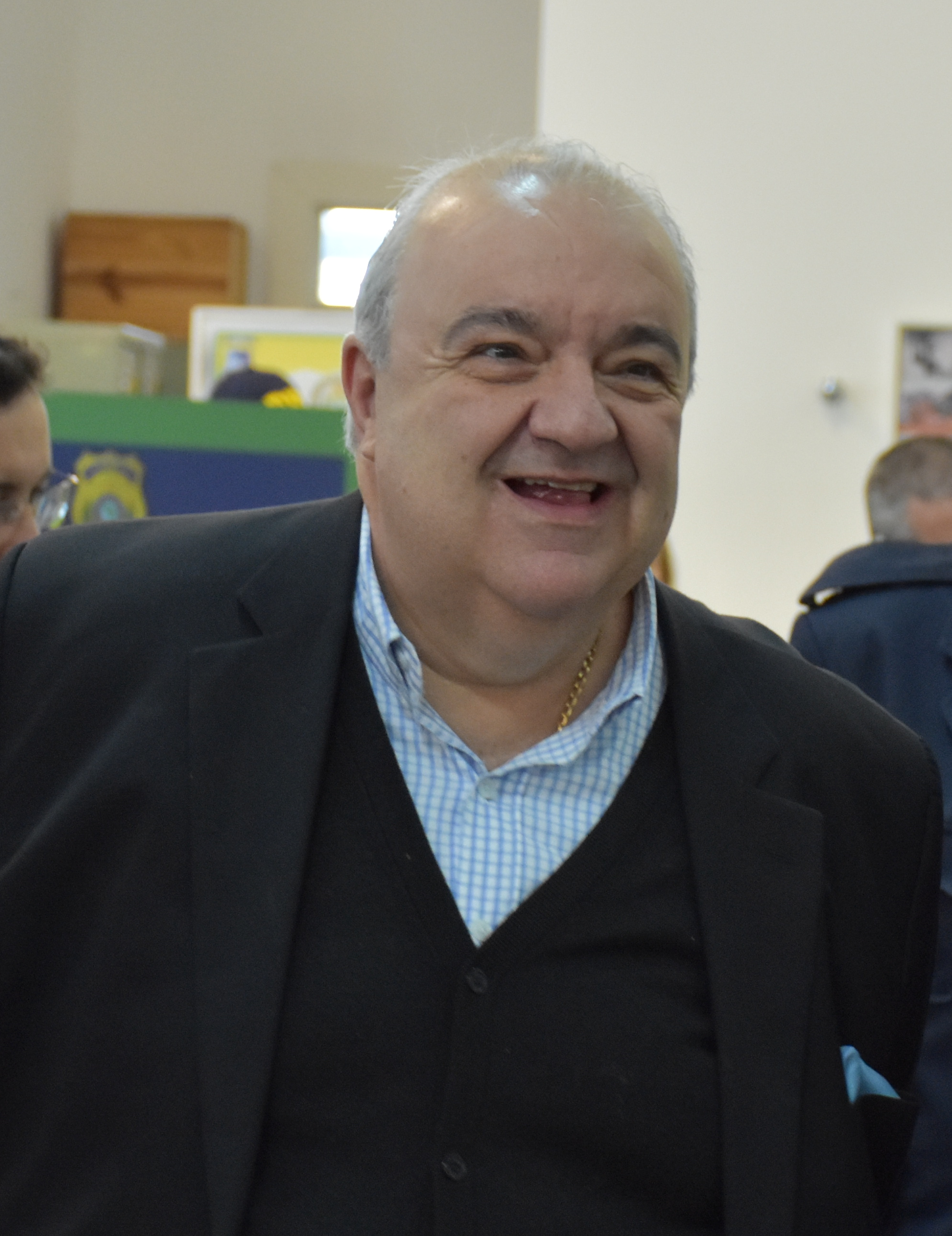

64th Mayor of Curitiba
- In office 1 January 2017 – 1 January 2025
- Preceded by: Gustavo Fruet
- Succeeded by: Eduardo Pimentel
- In office 1 January 1993 – 1 January 1997
- Preceded by: Jaime Lerner
- Succeeded by: Cássio Taniguchi

State Deputy
- In office 1 February 2003 – 1 February 2007
- Constituency: Paraná
- In office 1 February 1987 – 1 February 1993
- Constituency: Paraná

Federal Deputy
- In office 1 February 1999 – 1 February 2003
- Constituency: Paraná

Minister of Sport and Tourism
- In office 2 February 1999 – 9 May 2000
- President: Fernando Henrique Cardoso
- Preceded by: Pelé (Minister of Sport), José Botafogo Gonçalves
- Succeeded by: Carlos Melles

Personal details
- Born: 17 March 1956 (age 70) Curitiba, Brazil
- Party: MDB (2026–present)
- Other political affiliations: See list: PSD (2022–2026); UNIÃO (2022); DEM (2019–2021); PMN (2015–2019); MDB (2003–2015); PFL (1997–2003); PDT (1983–1997); PDS (1982–1983)
- Spouse: Margarita Sansone
- Education: Federal University of Paraná
- Profession: Engineer

Rafael Valdomiro Greca de Macedo (born 17 March 1956) is a Brazilian engineer and politician, and former mayor of Curitiba. He was minister of sport and tourism (1999–2000), state deputy (2003–06) and federal deputy from Paraná (2000–03). Greca was also mayor of Curitiba (from 1993 to 1996).
