= Rua 24 Horas =

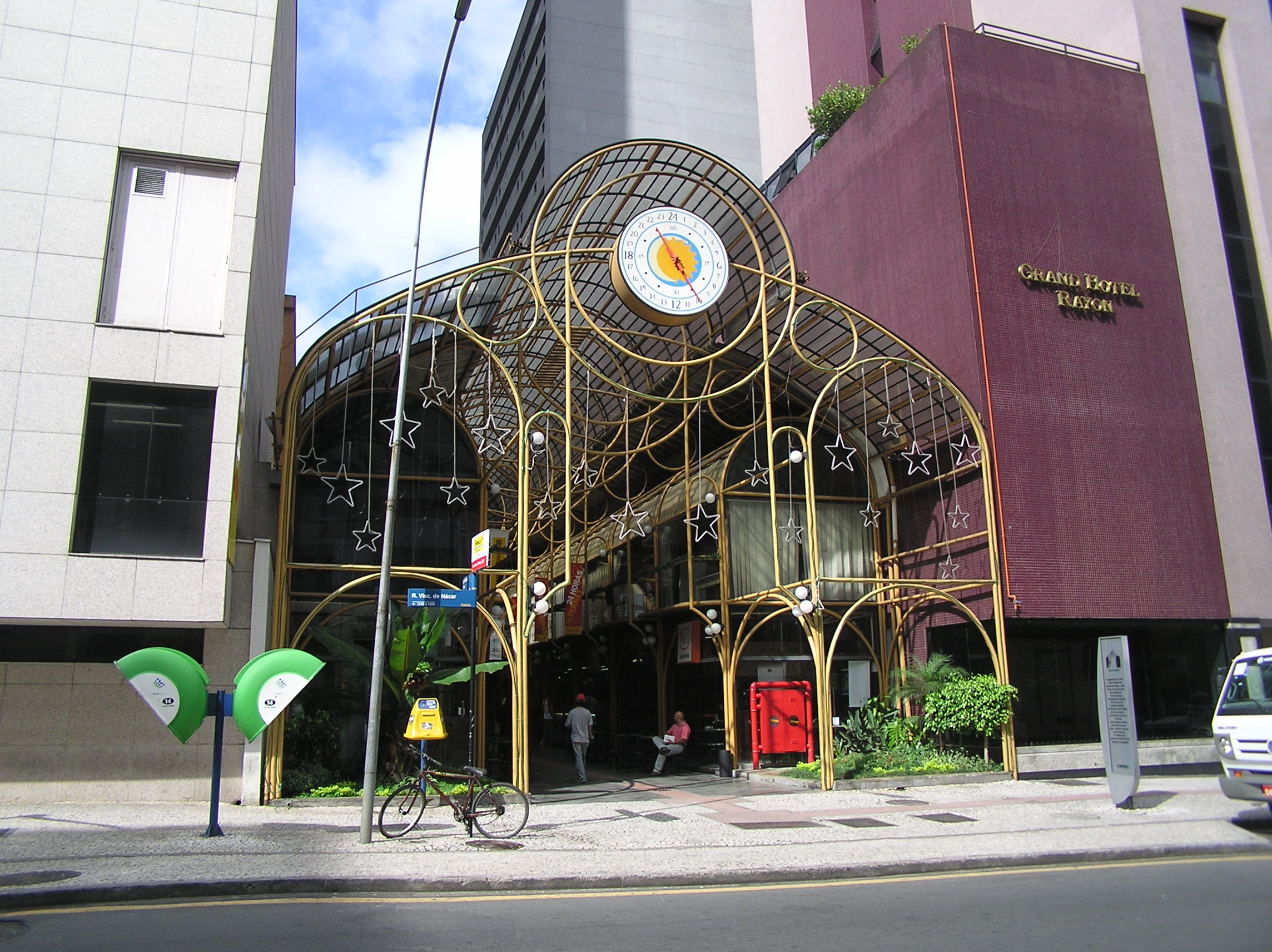
- Location: Curitiba, Brazil
- Coordinates: 25.434329°S 49.276647°W
- Address: Visconde de Nacar 1430
- Opened: September 1991 (inauguration); 11 November 2011 (reopened)
- Website: www.rua24horascuritiba.com.br

Rua 24 Horas is a shopping mall in Curitiba, Brazil.

== History ==
The Rua 24 Horas was opened by Jaime Lerner, the mayor of Curitiba, in 1991. It initially opened 24 hours a day. The mall closed in 2007, reopening in 2011 after a redevelopment. On reopening, the hours were limited to 9:00 AM to 10:00 PM.
