= Mário Pereira =

Brazilian politician

Governor of Paraná
- In office 1 April 1994 – 1 January 1995
- Preceded by: Roberto Requião
- Succeeded by: Jaime Lerner

Vice-governor of Paraná
- In office 15 March 1991 – 1 April 1994
- Preceded by: Ary Veloso Queiroz
- Succeeded by: Emília Belinati

State Secretary of Administration of Paraná
- In office 15 March 1987 – 1 April 1990

State Deputy of Paraná
- In office 1 February 1983 – 15 March 1987

Personal details
- Born: 4 April 1945 (age 81) Itajaí, Santa Catarina, Brazil
- Party: MDB (1973–1979); PMDB (1980–2009); PDT (2009–present)
- Education: Federal University of Santa Catarina

Mário Pereira (born 4 April 1945) is a Brazilian politician who briefly served as the governor of the state of Paraná from 1994 to 1995. Beforehand, he was the state secretary of administration, as well as a state deputy. He is currently a member of the Democratic Labour Party (PDT). An electrical engineer and native of Itajaí, he graduated from the Federal University of Santa Catarina (UFSC), and became known for his leadership of the Brazilian Democratic Movement (MDB) in the city of Cascavel, Paraná. He presided over the state railroad company Ferroeste from 1995 to 1998, as well as becoming the state president of the MDB in Paraná. In 1994, he was awarded the Order of Military Merit by president Itamar Franco.

Political offices
Preceded by Roberto Requião	51st Governor of Paraná; 1994–1995	Succeeded by Jaime Lerner
