= Cássio Taniguchi =

Brazilian electrical engineer and politician

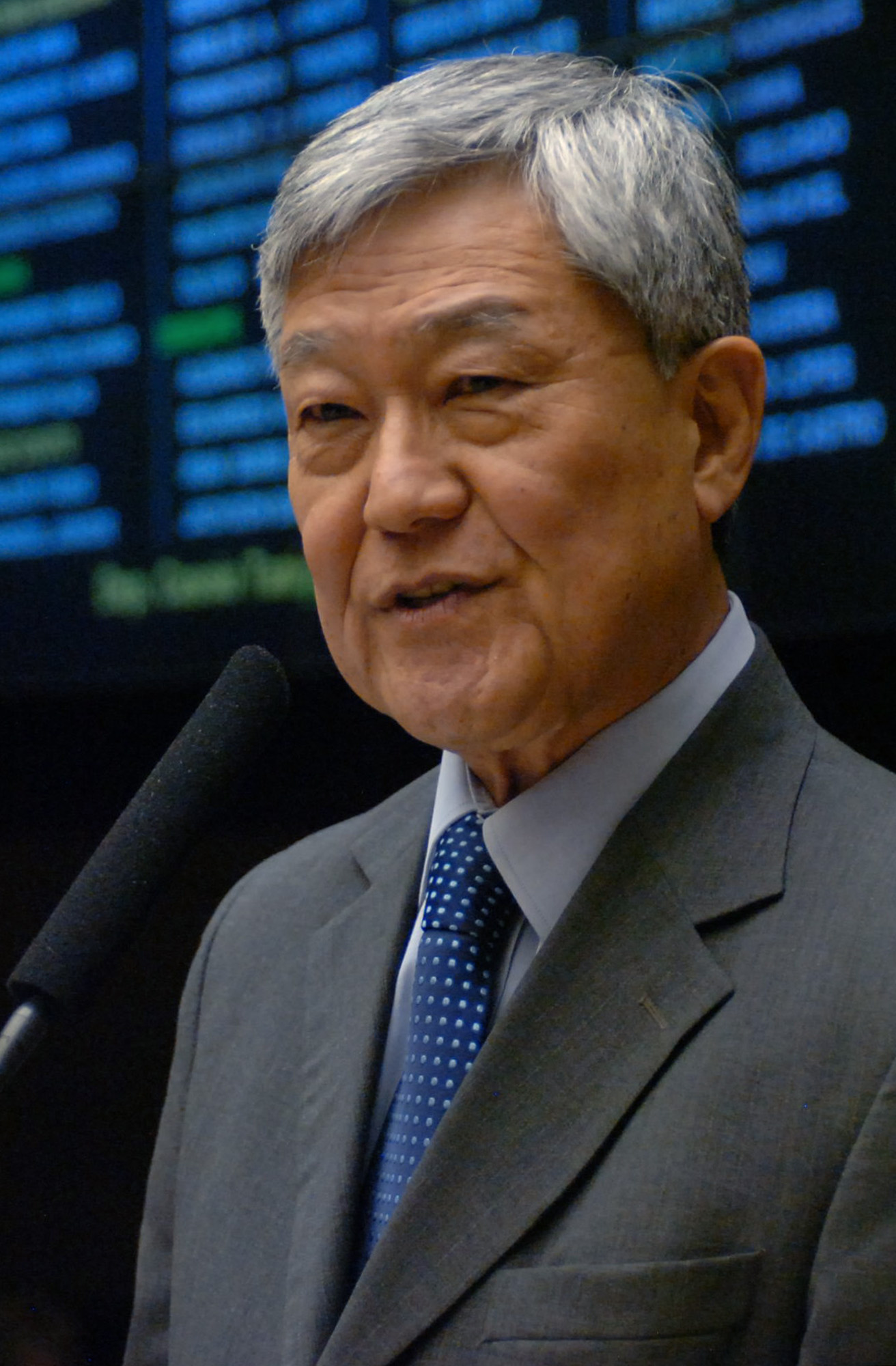

Federal Deputy for Paraná
- In office 1 February 2007 – 1 February 2011

Mayor of Curitiba
- In office 1 January 1997 – 1 January 2005
- Preceded by: Rafael Greca
- Succeeded by: Beto Richa

Personal details
- Born: 31 October 1941 (age 84) Paraguaçu Paulista, São Paulo, Brazil
- Party: PDT (1980–1997); PFL (1997–2007); Democratas (2007–2011); PSD (2011–present)
- Education: Instituto Tecnológico de Aeronáutica

Cássio Taniguchi (born 31 October 1940) is a Brazilian electrical engineer and politician. He was the mayor of Curitiba from 1997 to 2005, and later became a federal deputy for the state of Paraná from 2007 to 2011. He is currently a member of Social Democratic Party (PSD).

== Biography ==
Cássio Taniguchi was born in Paraguaçu Paulista to Masaji Taniguchi and Masako Taniguchi. He graduated with a degree in electrical engineering from the Instituto Tecnológico de Aeronáutica in 1964.

He presided over the public-private development partnership URBS, which oversees the public transit system in Curitiba, from 1972 to 1975. During this time he helped to implement the Curitiba Master Plan devised by then-mayor Jaime Lerner. He also headed the Institute of Research and Planning of Curitiba from 1980 to 1983 and again from 1989 to 1994. He was the state secretary of Planning and General Coordination, as well as state secretary of Industry and Commerce for the state of Paraná, under now-governor Lerner from 1995 to 1996. He took this position during a time of change for the economic profile of Paraná, as the state began to shift towards attracting and fostering an automobile manufacturing industry (such as with carmakers Audi, Volkswagen and Renault).

Taniguchi was the mayor of Curitiba from 1997 to 2004, with two mandates. He beat state deputy Angelo Vanhoni during his reelection campaign. In 2007, he became a federal deputy for the state of Paraná. During his time there, he introduced laws to offer incentives to cities to improve urban spaces in terms of reducing carbon emissions and promoting environmental friendliness, in order to combat global warming. After he assumed office, he became the secretary of Urban Development and the Environment for the Federal District. In January 2011, he became secretary of Planning of Paraná under governor Beto Richa.

During his time as mayor, in 2000, then-president Fernando Henrique Cardoso awarded Taniguchi the Commander class of the Order of Military Merit by decree.

In 2010, Taniguchi was sentenced to 6 months in prison, being accused of embezzling money as mayor from an agreement between the government of Curitiba and the Inter-American Development Bank. He was alleged to have used part of the funds to pay towards part of a will that was not in the provisions of the agreement. Taniguchi, however, was let go after confirmation by the Supreme Federal Court due to the length of the sentence already having been determined.

Taniguchi is currently a consultant for the United Nations Institute for Training and Research and is president of the Paraná branch of the Tancredo Neves Institute.
