= Jaime Lerner =

Brazilian politician (1937–2021)

- Lerner in 2009

Governor of Paraná
- In office 1 January 1995 – 31 December 2002
- Vice Governor: Emília Belinati
- Preceded by: Mário Pereira
- Succeeded by: Roberto Requião

Mayor of Curitiba
- In office 1 January 1989 – 31 December 1992
- Preceded by: Edgar Dantas Pimentel
- Succeeded by: Donato Gulin
- In office 15 March 1979 – 15 March 1983
- Nominated by: Ney Braga
- Preceded by: Saul Raiz
- Succeeded by: Maurício Fruet
- In office 1971–1974
- Nominated by: Haroldo Leon Peres
- Preceded by: Roberto Requião
- Succeeded by: Rafael Greca

Personal details
- Born: 17 December 1937 Curitiba, Paraná, Brazil
- Died: 27 May 2021 (aged 83) Curitiba, Paraná, Brazil
- Party: ARENA (1971–1979); PDS (1980–1985); PDT (1985–1997); PFL (1997–2003); PSB (2003–2008); DEM (2008–2021)
- Spouse: Fani Lerner (m. 1964; died 2009)
- Children: 2
- Education: Federal University of Paraná
- Profession: Architect and urbanist
- Website: jaimelerner.com

Jaime Lerner (17 December 1937 – 27 May 2021) was a Brazilian politician. He was the governor of the state of Paraná, in southern Brazil. He is renowned as an architect and urban planner, having been mayor of Curitiba, capital of Paraná, three times (1971–1974, 1979–1983 and 1989–1992). In 1994, Lerner was elected governor of Paraná, and was re-elected in 1998.

As an urban planner and architect, he was renowned in Brazil as he helped design most of the city walkways, roads, and public transportation of Curitiba such as the Rede Integrada de Transporte. In 1965, he helped create the Instituto de Pesquisa e Planejamento Urbano de Curitiba and designed the Curitiba Master Plan.

== Early life ==
Lerner was born into a Jewish family, originally from Łódź, Poland, who emigrated to Curitiba. He graduated from the Escola de Arquitetura da Universidade Federal do Paraná; (Architecture School of the Federal University of Paraná) in 1964, and later became professor at the University. In 1965, he helped create the Instituto de Pesquisa e Planejamento Urbano de Curitiba (Institute of Urban Planning and Research of Curitiba, also known as IPPUC) and participated in the design of the Curitiba Master Plan.

== Mayor of Curitiba ==
In 1988, Jaime Lerner announced his candidacy for mayor of Curitiba with only 12 days remaining before the election. During his first term, Lerner implemented the Rede Integrada de Transporte (also called bus rapid transit), and continued to implement a host of social, ecological, and urban reforms during his ensuing terms as mayor.

As mayor, Lerner employed unorthodox solutions to Curitiba's geographic challenges. Like many cities, Curitiba is bordered by floodplain. Wealthier cities in the United States, such as New Orleans and Sacramento, have built expensive and expensive-to-maintain levee systems on floodplain. In contrast, Curitiba purchased the floodplain and made parks. The city now ranks among the world leaders in per-capita park area. Curitiba had the problem of its status as a third-world city, unable to afford the tractors and petroleum to mow these parks. The innovative response was "municipal sheep" who keep the parks' vegetation under control and whose wool funds children's programs.

When Lerner became mayor, Curitiba had some bairros impossible to service by municipal waste removal. The "streets" were too narrow. Rather than abandon these people or raze these slums, Lerner began a program that traded bags of groceries and transit passes for bags of trash. The slums got much cleaner.

Similarly, Curitiba has a nearby bay that was a dumping ground that would be extremely costly to clean up. Lerner began a program that paid fishermen for any garbage they retrieved (by the pound). That way, they can make money even outside fishing season, supplementing their income. The savings to Curitiba are in the millions.

Lerner instituted many innovative social and educational programs. Bairro kids can be apprenticed to city employees if they want to avoid going to school. Although his term as mayor is not without controversy, Curitiba does not have the gangs of much more populous cities such as Rio de Janeiro.

== Bus Rapid Transit ==
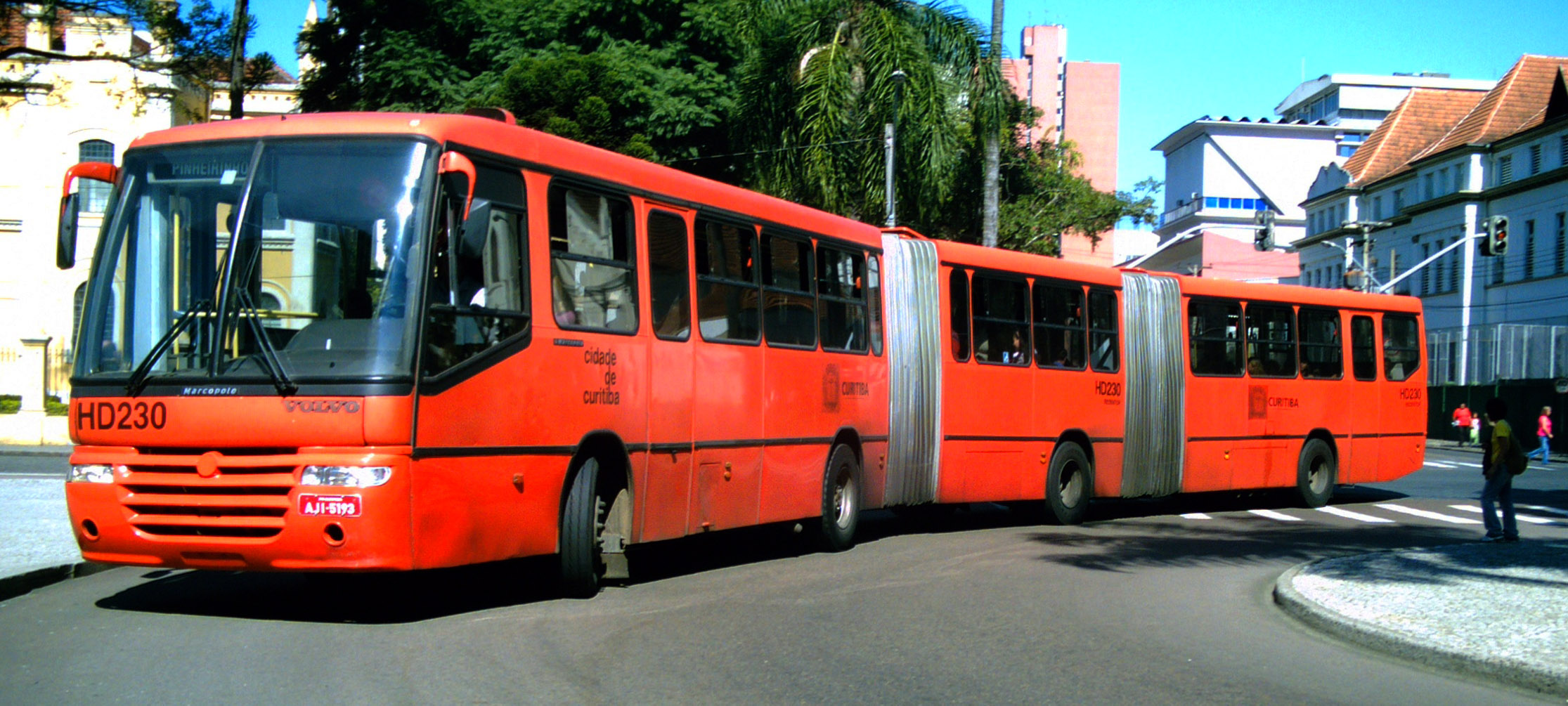
Bi-articulated bus of Curitiba

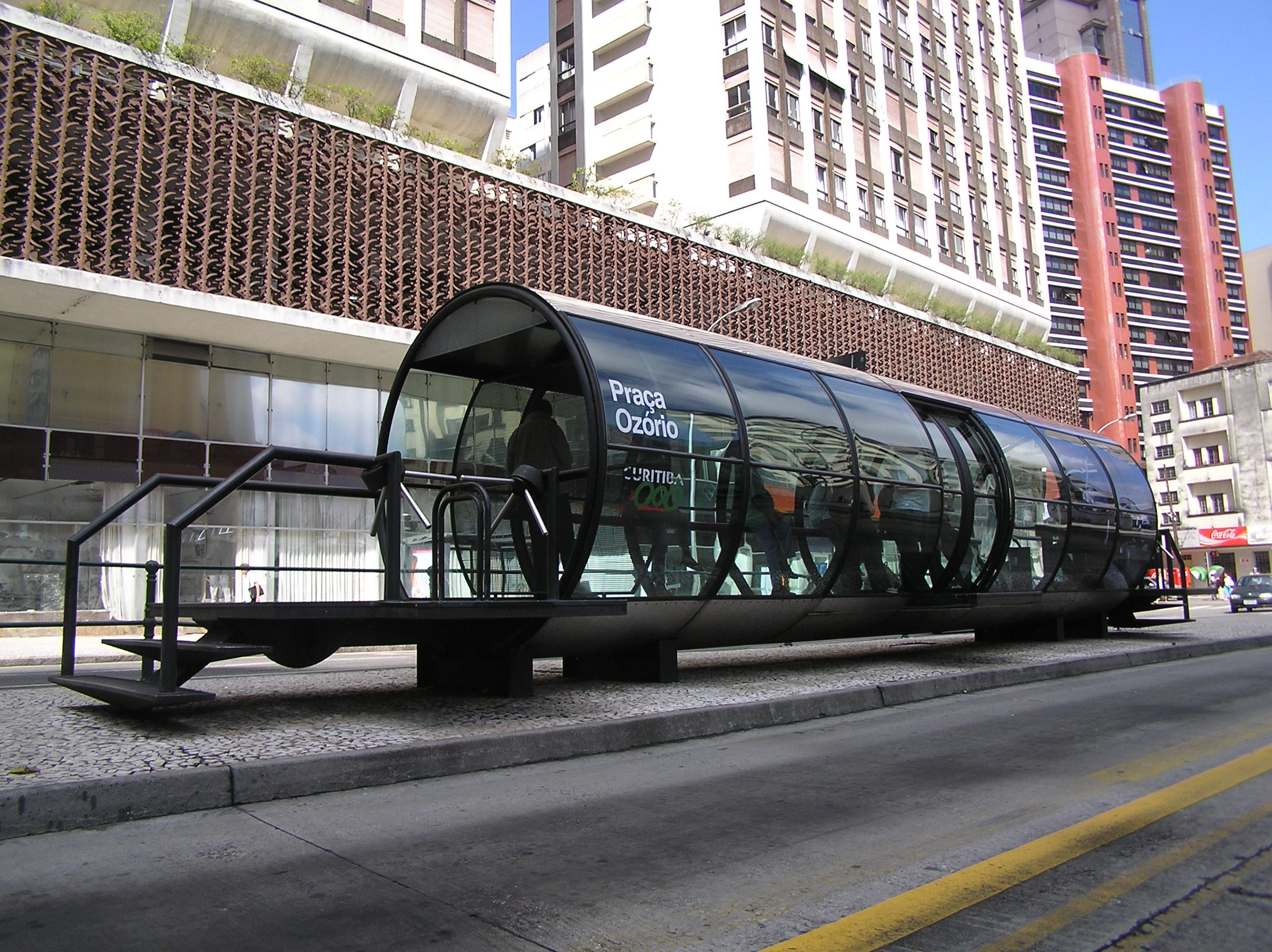
Tube-shaped bus shelter in Curitiba, created during the Lerner era

Perhaps the crown jewel of Curitiba's achievements is its Rede Integrada de Transporte Bus Rapid Transit system (called "Speedybus"). Originally, the city was given federal money to build a subway (Curitiba is not a small town), but Lerner discovered that "heavy rail" like a subway costs ten times the amount of "light rail" (trolleys), which, in turn, costs ten times the amount of a bus system, even with dedicated bus ways. The "light rail" savings usually touted to sway municipal decision makers occur because even trolleys can have relatively fewer drivers than a 40-60 passenger bus. He got Volvo to make 270 person Swedish articulated buses (300 Brazilians, said Lerner), so that the problem of a lower passenger-number-to-driver ratio was no longer an issue. The city built attractive transit stops with the look and feel of train stations, and all with handicapped access equipment, inducing private firms to purchase and operate the buses. A hierarchy of buses of six sizes feed one another. The city controls the routes and fares, while the private companies hire drivers and maintain equipment.

Natural land-use patterns within the city of Curitiba support public transit systems. Buildings along the dedicated busways are up to six stories tall, gradually giving way, within a few blocks, to single story homes. This mix of densities ensures sufficient user population within walking distance of bus stops.

== As Governor of Paraná ==
As governor of Paraná, Lerner used a policy of attracting investment to turn the state into one of Brazil's industrial hubs, generating investments of over US$20 billion between 1995 and 2001. Following upon his experience in Curitiba, Lerner focused on issues like transport, education, health, sanitation, leisure, and industrialization.

UNICEF awarded Lerner the Child and Peace Prize in 1996 for his programs "'Da Rua para a Escola'" (From the Street to School), "'Protegendo a Vida'" (Protecting Life), and "'Universidade do Professor'" (Professor's University).

In 2011, Lerner was sentenced to three-and-a-half years in prison for the illegal layoff of a public tender during his mandate as governor. He wasn't arrested due to his age.

== Later life ==
At the General Assembly of the International Union of Architects in July 2002, Lerner was elected president for a period of three years. Lerner was also a professor of Urban and Regional Planning at the Universidade Federal do Paraná, his alma mater, and has been a guest professor at the University of California, Berkeley.

In April 2005, Jaime Lerner participated in the Symposium of China Bus Rapid Transit Initiative (Shanghai) to promote the BRT project in some larger cities. He was specially interviewed which made an impact on mayors and urban planners across China.

Lerner was a member of the Board of Directors of World Resources Institute.

Lerner died of kidney disease on May 27, 2021, at the age of 83.

== Selected bibliography ==
- Acupuntura urbana (Editora Record, ISBN 85-01-06851-9, 2003)
  - Urban Acupuncture. (Washington, DC: Island Press. ISBN 9781610915830, 2014)
- O vizinho: parente por parte de rua (Editora Record, ISBN 85-01-06877-2, 2005)

== Awards ==
Lerner has won a variety of Brazilian and international prizes:

- 1990: United Nations Environmental Award, awarded by the United Nations Environmental Program (UNEP)
- 1990: Annual Prize of the International Institute for Energy Conservation (IIEC)
- 1991: Scroll of Honor, United Nations Human Settlements Programme
- 1991: Tree of Learning, IUCN
- 1994: Neutra Award: for contributions to Environmental Design.
- 1996: Child and Peace Award, UNICEF
- 1997: Thomas Jefferson Foundation Medal in Architecture, University of Virginia
- 2000: Prince Claus Award, the Netherlands (2000)
- 2001: Pioneer 2001, International Council for Caring Communities (ICCC-USA)
- 2001: 2001 World Technology Award for Transportation, National Museum of Science and Industry, UK
- 2011: Leadership in Transport Award of the International Transport Forum at the OECD
- 2012: Honorary Doctorate of Arts, Plymouth University

== Notes ==
Political offices
Preceded by Edgar Dantas Pimentel	Mayor of Curitiba; 1971–1974; 1979–1983; 1989–1993	Succeeded by Donato Gulin
Preceded by Saul Raiz	Mayor of Curitiba; 1971–1974; 1979–1983; 1989–1993	Succeeded by Maurício Fruet
Preceded by Roberto Requião	Mayor of Curitiba; 1971–1974; 1979–1983; 1989–1993	Succeeded by Rafael Greca
Preceded by Mário Pereira	Governor of Paraná; 1995–2003	Succeeded by Roberto Requião
Trade union offices
Preceded by Vassilis Sgoutas	President of the International Union of Architects; 2002–2005	Succeeded by Gaétan Siew
