= 2020 Curitiba mayoral election =

2020 Curitiba municipal election
- 15 November 2020 (first round)
- Mayoral election
- Opinion polls
- Turnout: 69.81 (first round)
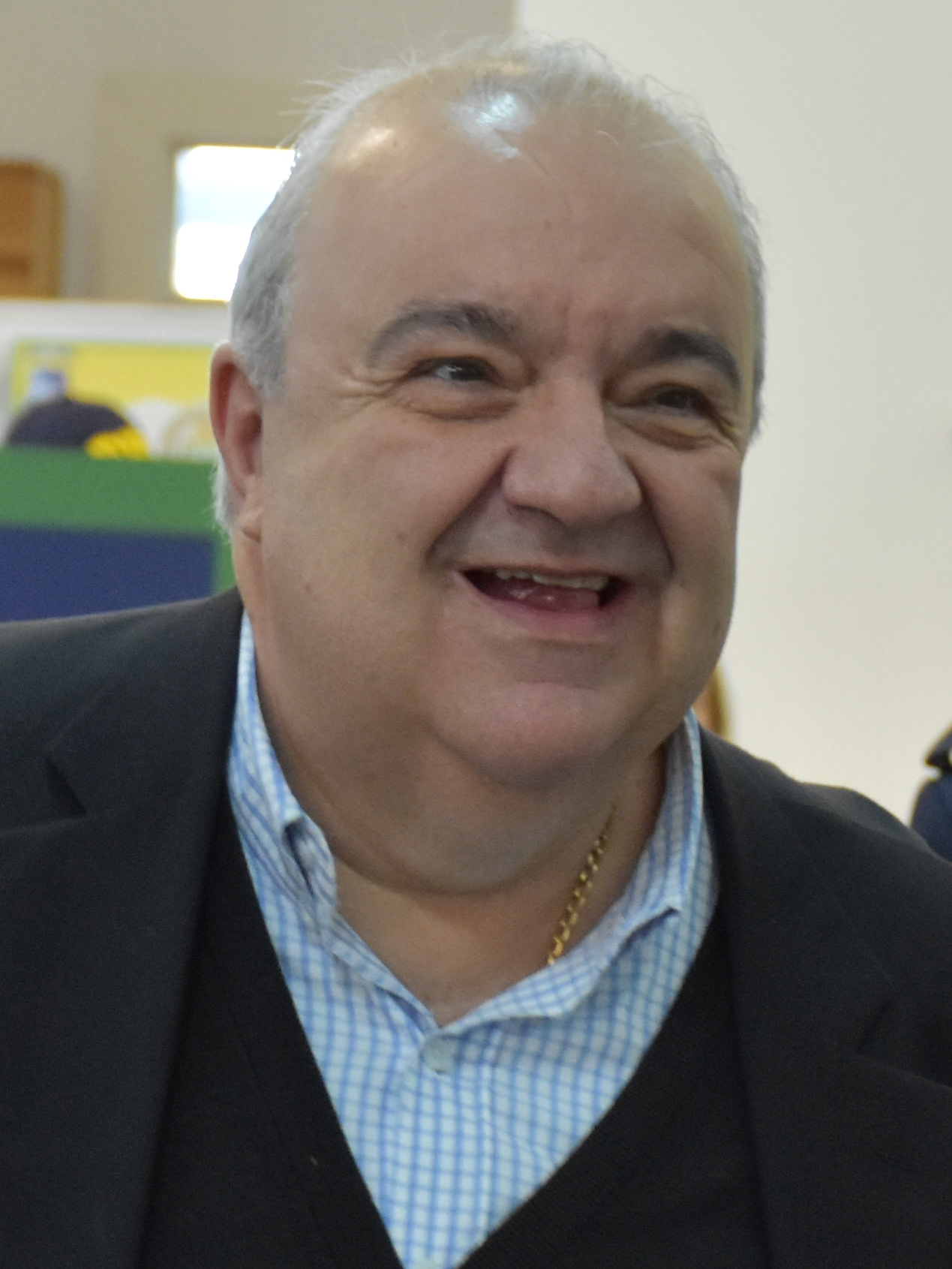

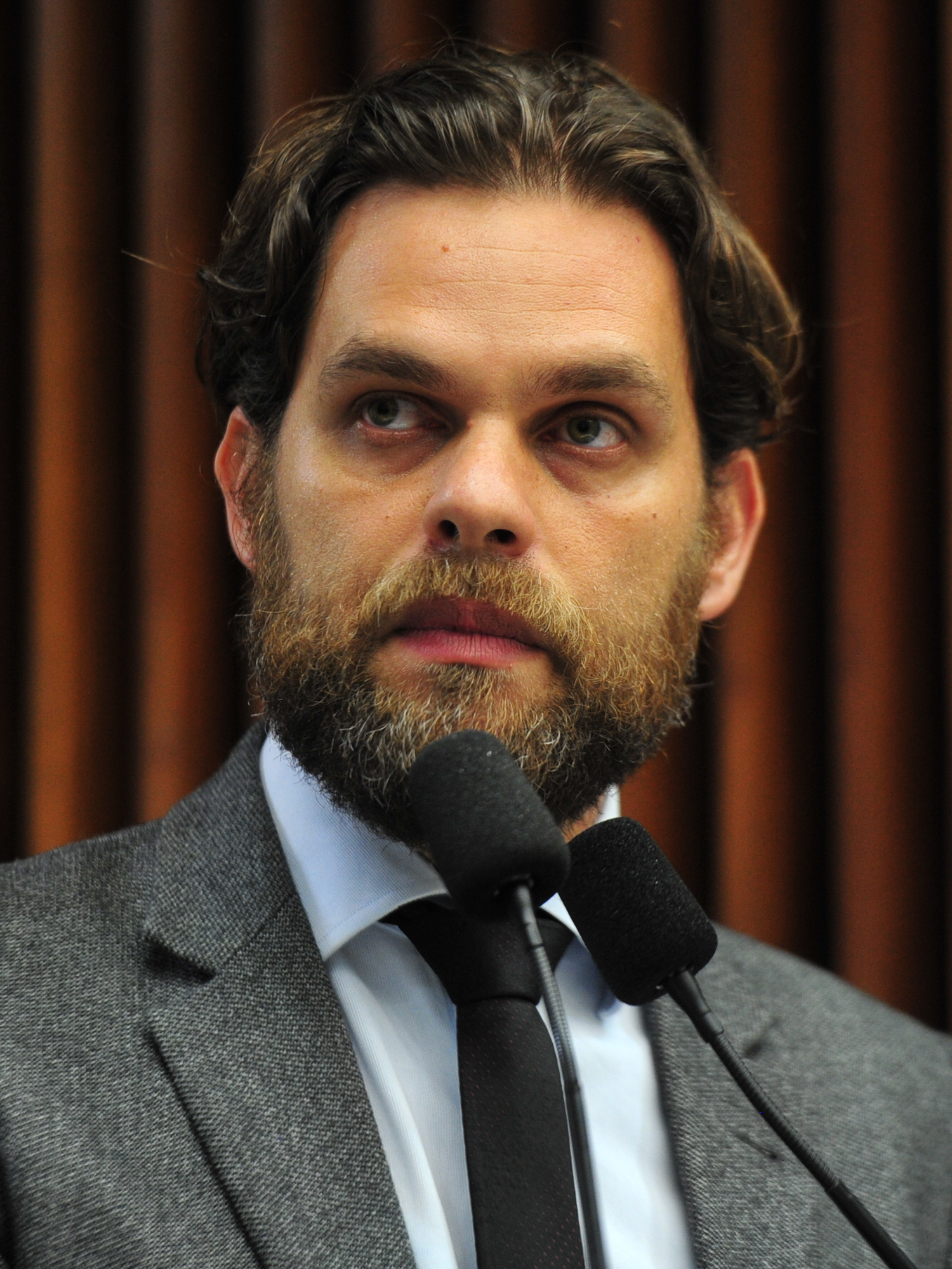

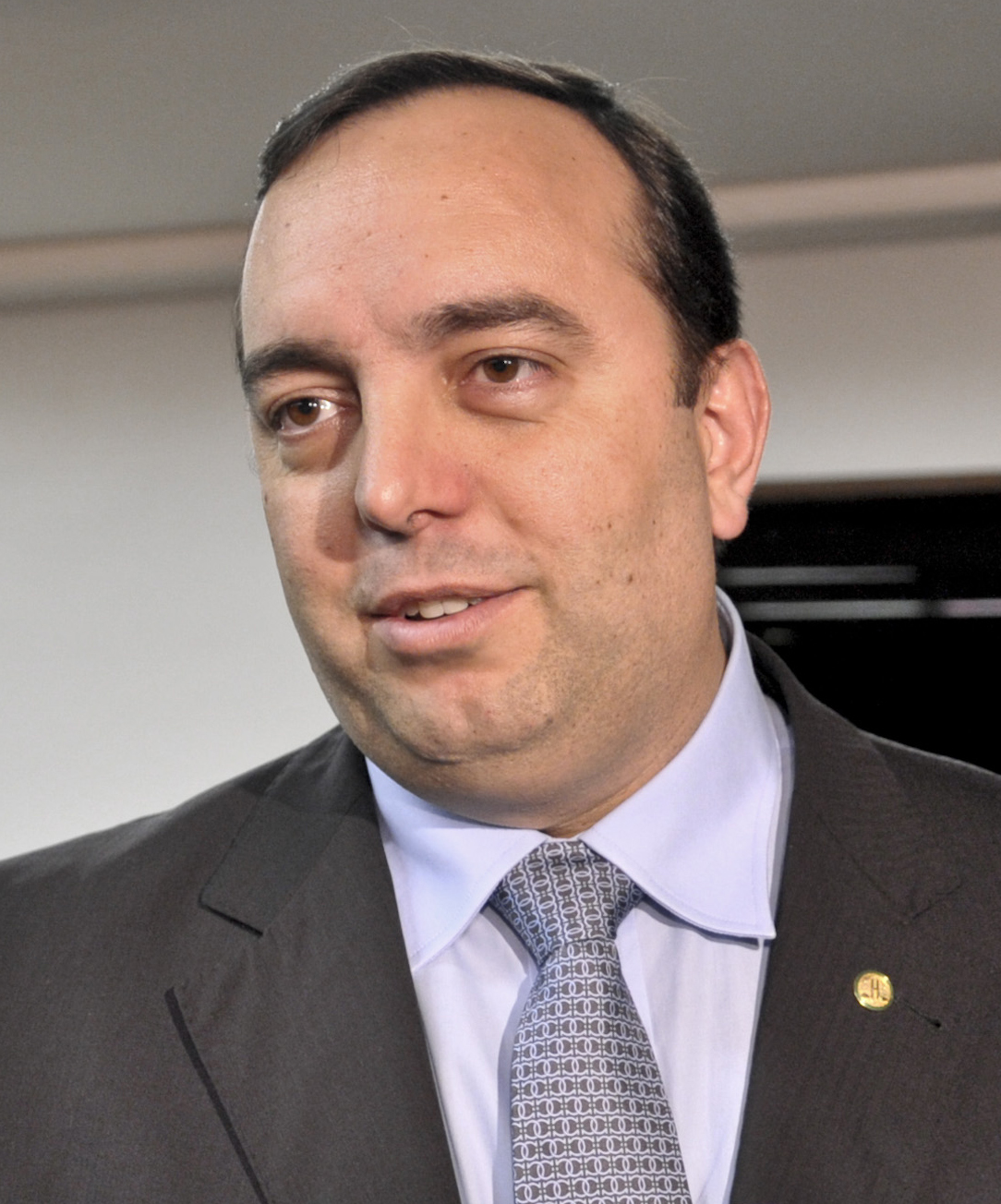
| Candidate | Rafael Greca | Goura Nataraj | Fernando Francischini |
| Party | DEM | PDT | PSL |
| Alliance | Smart and Vibrant Curitiba | – | People First |
| Running mate | Eduardo Pimentel | Ana Lucia Moro | Leticia Pan |
| Popular vote | 499,821 | 110,977 | 52,340 |
| Percentage | 59.75% | 13.27% | 6.26% |
- Rafael Greca 30–39% 50–59% 60–69% 70–79% No votes
Mayor before election
Rafael Greca
DEM
Elected mayor
Rafael Greca
DEM
- Parliamentary election
| Party | Leader | Vote % | Seats | +/– |
Municipal Chamber
| DEM | —N/a | 10.21 | 5 | +3 |
| PSL | —N/a | 7.41 | 3 | +3 |
| PT | —N/a | 6.20 | 3 | +2 |
| PDT | —N/a | 6.01 | 3 | −2 |
| NOVO | —N/a | 5.48 | 2 | +2 |
| PP | —N/a | 4.46 | 2 | +1 |
| PODE | —N/a | 3.95 | 2 | +2 |
| Republicanos | —N/a | 3.92 | 2 | +1 |
| Solidarity | —N/a | 3.91 | 2 | +1 |
| PV | —N/a | 3.55 | 1 | −1 |
| MDB | —N/a | 3.54 | 1 | −1 |
| PTB | —N/a | 3.28 | 1 | −1 |
| DEMOCRATA | —N/a | 3.18 | 1 | +1 |
| Cidadania | —N/a | 2.67 | 1 | +1 |
| Patriota | —N/a | 2.66 | 1 | +1 |
| PSB | —N/a | 2.18 | 1 | −2 |
| PSC | —N/a | 2.17 | 1 | −2 |
| DC | —N/a | 2.15 | 1 | −1 |
This lists parties that won seats. See the complete results below.

The 2020 Curitiba municipal election took place in the city of Curitiba, Brazil, with the first round taking place on 15 November 2020. Voters elected a mayor, a vice mayor and 38 councillors who are responsible for the city administration. Their respective terms began on 1 January 2021 and will end on 31 December 2024. The incumbent mayor is Rafael Greca, a member of the former party Democrats (DEM), who was able to run for reelection.

The elections were initially scheduled to happen on 4 October 2020 (first round), and in case of a second round, it would happen on 25 October 2020. But due to the aggravation of the COVID-19 pandemic in Brazil, they've been rescheduled to November. The result was a victory in the first round for the incumbent mayor, Rafael Greca, of the Democrats, winning 499,821 votes and a share of 59.75% of the popular vote.

== Political context and COVID-19 pandemic ==
The 2020 municipal elections were marked by the COVID-19 pandemic in Brazil, which caused parties to remodel their campaign strategies. The Superior Electoral Court of Brazil (TSE) authorized parties to hold conventions to choose candidates for ballots through digital transmission platforms, to avoid crowds that could proliferate the COVID-19. Some parties used digital media to launch their pre-candidacies. Furthermore, from this election onwards, Constitutional Amendment 97/2017 was put into practice, which prohibits the celebration of party coalitions for legislative elections, which could lead to an increase in candidates for the Municipal Chamber.

== Candidates ==
=== Confirmed candidacies ===
- Rafael Greca (DEM): Born in Curitiba in 1956, Greca is an economist, engineer, an urban planner, writer, poet, historian and a Brazilian politician. He was a councillor of Curitiba from 1983 to 1987, then he was elected as a state deputy in the Legislative Assembly of Paraná for two non-consecutive terms (1987–1993; 2003–2007) and he was finally elected for the first time as a mayor of Curitiba from 1993 to 1997. After his term ended, Greca was elected in 1998 to represent Paraná in the Chamber of Deputies of Brazil from 1999 to 2003; however, he was appointed as the Minister of Sport and Turism during Fernando Henrique Cardoso's second term from January 1999 to May 2000, and he returned to the Chamber of Deputies after leaving the ministry. Greca decided to run again in the 2016 Curitiba mayoral election, winning the dispute against his opponent, Ney Leprevost, in the second round. He was announced as the candidate for reelection by the Democrats on 31 August 2020. Eduardo Pimentel, a member of the Social Democratic Party (PSD) was appointed as Greca's running mate again. Pimentel is a company administrator, the grandson of the former governor of Paraná, Paulo Pimentel, and the Vice Mayor of Curitiba since 2016.
- Goura Nataraj (PDT): Born in Curitiba in 1979, Nataraj is a cycling advocate, philosopher, yoga teacher and a Brazilian politician. He entered politics for the first time as a candidate by the Green Party (PV) to represent Paraná in the Chamber of Deputies of Brazil in the 2014 Brazilian general election, but wasn't elected. He was first elected as a councillor for Curitiba in the 2016 Curitiba city elections, from 2017 to 2019, and in the 2018 Paraná state elections, he was elected as a state deputy in the Legislative Assembly of Paraná, being reelected in 2022. His candidacy for mayor was announced by the Democratic Labour Party on 12 September 2020. His running mate is the journalist and the activist Ana Lucia Moro.
- Fernando Francischini (PSL): Born in Londrina in 1970, Francischini is a chief of police and a Brazilian politician. He was first elected in the 2010 Paraná state elections to represent Paraná in the Chamber of Deputies and was reelected in 2014. In 2019, he was elected as a state deputy in the Legislative Assembly of Paraná. However, his term was revoked by the Superior Electoral Court (TSE) in October 2021, due to Francischini being responsible for spreading fake news against the electronic voting system of Brazil. Francischini was also the Secretary of Public Safety of Paraná under Beto Richa's administration (2014–2015). His candidacy was announced by the Social Liberal Party on 12 September 2020, and his running mate is Leticia Pan, a dentist and a military police officer.
- João Guilherme (NOVO): Born in Curitiba in 1973, Guilherme is a physician and businessman. His political career started when he was announced as the running mate of Ney Leprevost in 2016 Curitiba mayoral election; not being elected at the time. He was announced as a candidate by the New Party on 31 August 2020. His running mate is the social entrepreneur Geovana Conti.
- Christiane Yared (PL): Born in Curitiba in 1960, Yared is a businesswoman, an evangelical pastor and a Brazilian politician. Her political career started after the death of her son in a traffic accident, when she decided to run for a seat at the Chamber of Deputies in the 2014 Paraná state elections; being elected as the most voted candidate in that election and reelected in the 2018 Paraná state elections. Her candidacy was announced by the Liberal Party (PL) on 12 September 2020 and her running mate is the businesswoman Jilcy Rink.
- Carol Arns (PODE): Born in Curitiba in 1976, Arns is a lawyer, teacher, the daughter of the senator of Paraná Flávio Arns (2019–2027) and the grand-niece of Zilda Arns. Her candidacy was announced on 31 August 2020 by Podemos (PODE) and his running mate is also the lawyer Rolf Koerner.
- João Arruda (MDB): Born in Curitiba in 1976, Arruda is a Brazilian politician, being elected for the first time in the 2010 Paraná state elections to represent Paraná in the Chamber of Deputies of Brazil. He was reelected in 2014 and didn't run for a third term in 2018; he decided instead to run for the government of Paraná in the 2018 Paraná gubernatorial election, losing to Ratinho Júnior (PSD) in the first round. His candidacy was announced by the Brazilian Democratic Movement (MDB) on 16 September 2020 and his running mate is the retired teacher Sheila Toledo.
- Paulo Opuszka (PT): Born in Curitiba in 1977, Opuszka is a teacher at the Federal University of Paraná (UFPR), lawyer and a master and doctor in law. His candidacy was announced by the Workers' Party (PT) on 14 September 2020 and his running mate is the chief of police Pedro Felipe.
- Marisa Lobo (Avante): Born in Botucatu, São Paulo in 1963, Lobo is a psychologist and a Christian conservative. Her candidacy was announced by Avante (lit: 'Forward') on 14 September 2020 and her running mate is the lawyer Romulo Quenehen.
- Renato Mocellin (PV): Born in Colombo, Paraná in 1958, Mocellin is a teacher. His candidacy was announced by the Green Party (PV) on 31 August 2020 and his running mate is the lawyer Soraia Dill Pozo.
- Letícia Lanz (PSOL): Born in Belo Horizonte, Minas Gerais in 1951, Lanz is a psychologist and the first transgender woman to run as mayor of Curitiba. Her candidacy was announced on 11 September 2020 and her running mate is the lawyer Giana de Marco.
- Zé Boni (PTC): Born in Loanda, Paraná in 1977, Boni is a company administrator. His candidacy was announced by the Christian Labor Party (PTC) on 14 September 2020 and his running mate is the merchant Valdo Peres.
- Camila Lanes (PCdoB): Born in Curitiba in 1996, Lanes is a student and vice-president of the Communist Party of Brazil in Curitiba. Her candidacy was announced by the party on 12 September 2020 and his running mate is the physician José Ferreira Lopes (also known as Doutor Zequinha).
- Eloy Casagrande (REDE): Born in Curitiba in 1959, Casagrande is a teacher. His candidacy was announced by the Sustainability Network (REDE) on 12 September 2020 and his running mate is the guardianship counselor Michel Urânia.
- Samara Garratini (PSTU): Born in Curitiba in 1991, Garratini is a teacher. Her candidacy was announced by the United Socialist Workers' Party (PSTU) on 12 September 2020. His running mate is the mailman Samuel Mattos.

| Party | Candidate | Most relevant political office or occupation | Party | Running mate | Coalition | Electoral number |
|---|---|---|---|---|---|---|
| Democrats (DEM) | Rafael Greca | Mayor of Curitiba (2017–present) | Social Democratic Party (PSD) | Eduardo Pimentel | Smart and Vibrant Curitiba: Democrats (DEM); Social Democratic Party (PSD); Progressistas (PP); Brazilian Socialist Party (PSB); Brazilian Labour Party (PTB); Social Christian Party (PSC); Party of National Mobilization (PMN); Brazilian Labour Renewal Party (PRTB); Cidadania; Republicans | 25 |
| Democratic Labour Party (PDT) | Goura Nataraj | Member of the Legislative Assembly of Paraná (2019–present) | Democratic Labour Party (PDT) | Ana Lucia Moro | —N/a | 12 |
| Social Liberal Party (PSL) | Fernando Francischini | Member of the Legislative Assembly of Paraná (2019–2021) | Social Liberal Party (PSL) | Leticia Pan | People First: Social Liberal Party (PSL); Brazilian Social Democracy Party (PSDB); Solidarity; Patriota; Christian Democracy (DC) | 17 |
| New Party (NOVO) | João Guilherme | Physician | New Party (NOVO) | Geovana Conti | —N/a | 30 |
| Liberal Party (PL) | Christiane Yared | Member of the Chamber of Deputies (2015–2023) | Liberal Party (PL) | Jilcy Rink | Curitiba Citizen: Liberal Party (PL); Republican Party of the Social Order (PROS) | 22 |
| Podemos (PODE) | Carol Arns | Lawyer | Podemos (PODE) | Rolf Koerner | —N/a | 19 |
| Brazilian Democratic Movement (MDB) | João Arruda | Member of the Chamber of Deputies (2011–2019) | Brazilian Democratic Movement (MDB) | Sheila Toledo | —N/a | 15 |
| Workers' Party (PT) | Paulo Opuszka | Teacher | Workers' Party (PT) | Pedro Felipe | —N/a | 13 |
| Avante | Marisa Lobo | Psychologist | Avante | Romulo Quenehen | —N/a | 70 |
| Green Party (PV) | Renato Mocellin | Teacher | Green Party (PV) | Soraia Dill Pozo | —N/a | 43 |
| Socialism and Liberty Party (PSOL) | Letícia Lanz | Psychologist | Socialism and Liberty Party (PSOL) | Giana de Marco | —N/a | 50 |
| Christian Labor Party (PTC) | Zé Boni | Company administrator | Christian Labor Party (PTC) | Valdo Peres | —N/a | 36 |
| Communist Party of Brazil (PCdoB) | Camila Lanes | Student | Communist Party of Brazil (PCdoB) | José Ferreira Lopes | —N/a | 65 |
| Sustainability Network (REDE) | Eloy Casagrande | Teacher | Sustainability Network (REDE) | Michel Urânia | —N/a | 18 |
| United Socialist Workers' Party (PSTU) | Samara Garratini | Teacher | United Socialist Workers' Party (PSTU) | Samuel de Mattos | —N/a | 16 |

=== Candidacy denied ===
The candidacy of Diogo Furtado, from the Workers' Cause Party, was denied by the Electoral Court due to the party's municipal directory not having a CNPJ (National Register of Legal Entities). Only parties that have this register are allowed to run candidacies.

| Party | Candidate | Most relevant political office or occupation | Party | Running mate | Coalition | Electoral number |
|---|---|---|---|---|---|---|
| Workers' Cause Party (PCO) | Diogo Furtado | Visual artist | Workers' Cause Party (PCO) | Feris Boabaid | —N/a | 29 |

== Opinion polls ==
=== 2020 ===
| Pollster/client(s) | Date(s) conducted | Sample size | Greca DEM | Goura PDT | Francischini PSL | João G. NOVO | Yared PL | Carol PODE | Arruda MDB | Opuszka PT | Others | Abst. Undec. | Lead |
|---|---|---|---|---|---|---|---|---|---|---|---|---|---|
| Ibope | 12–13 November | 805 | 56% | 11% | 8% | 3% | 4% | 4% | 5% | 2% | 6% (Note: Renato Mocellin (PV) with 2%; Marisa Lobo (Avante) with 1%; Zé Boni (PTC) with 1%; Letícia Lanz (PSOL) with 1%; Camila Lanes (PCdoB) with 1%; Samara Garratini (PSTU), Diogo Furtado (PCO) and Eloy Casagrande (REDE) didn't achieve 1% of the votes.) | (Note: Valid votes (exit poll)) | 45% |
| Ibope | 12–13 November | 805 | 48% | 10% | 7% | 3% | 4% | 3% | 4% | 1% | 4% (Note: Marisa Lobo (Avante) with 1%; Renato Mocellin (PV) with 1%; Zé Boni with 1%; Camila Lanes (PCdoB) with 1%; Samara Garratini (PSTU), Letícia Lanz (PSOL), Diogo Furtado (PCO) and Eloy Casagrande (REDE) didn't achieve 1% of the votes on this poll.) | 15% | 38% |
| Opinião | 2–4 November | 1,220 | 43.6% | 6.21% | 6.74% | 4.52% | 4.29% | 3.07% | 4.21% | 1.38% | 3.83% (Note: Marisa Lobo (Avante) with 0.92%; Zé Boni (PTC) with 0.69%; Samara Garratini (PSTU) with 0.61%; Renato Mocellin (PV) with 0.54%; Letícia Lanz (PSOL) with 0.38%; Camila Lanes (PCdoB) with 0.31%; Diogo Furtado (PCO) with 0.23% and Eloy Casagrande (REDE) with 0.15%) | 22.14% | 36.86% |
| Ibope | 20–22 October | 805 | 46% | 8% | 8% | 2% | 5% | 3% | 3% | 1% | 5% (Note: Samara Garratini (PSTU) with 1%; Marisa Lobo (Avante) with 1%; Renato Mocellin (PV) with 1%; Zé Boni (PTC) with 1%; Letícia Lanz (PSOL) with 1%; both Camila Lanes (PCdoB) and Diogo Furtado (PCO) didn't achieve 1% of the votes on this poll. Eloy Casagrande (REDE) wasn't mentioned by anyone.) | 19% | 38% |
| Opinião | 16–19 October | 1,200 | 45.57% | 5.66% | 7.95% | 3.2% | 3.93% | 2.13% | 3.03% | 0.9% | 4.33% (Note: Renato Mocellin (PV) with 0.98%; Marisa Lobo (Avante) with 0.66%; Samara Garratini (PSTU) with 0.57%; Zé Boni (PTC) with 0.57%; Diogo Furtado (PCO) with 0.57%; Camila Lanes (PCdoB) with 0.49%; Letícia Lanz (PSOL) with 0.33% and Eloy Casagrande (REDE) with 0.16%) | 21.15% | 37.62% |
| Ibope | 4–5 October | 602 | 47% | 5% | 6% | 1% | 3% | 1% | 3% | 1% | 7% (Note: Samara Garratini (PSTU) with 2%; Camila Lanes (PCdoB) with 1%; Diogo Furtado (PCO) with 1%; Marisa Lobo (Avante) with 1%; Renato Mocellin (PV) with 1%; Zé Boni (PTC) with 1%; both Eloy Casagrande (Rede) and Letícia Lanz (PSOL) didn't achieve 1% of the votes.) | 25% | 41% |
| October 2020 | | | The election campaign begins. The parties formalize their candidacies for mayor of Curitiba. | | | | | | | | | | |
| Pollster/client(s) | Date(s) conducted | Sample size | Rafael Greca DEM | Gustavo Fruet PDT | Ney Leprevost PSD | Fernando Francischini PSL | Luciano Ducci PSB | Christiane Yared PL | Luizão Goulart Republicans | João Guilherme NOVO | Others | Abst. Undec. | Lead |
| Paraná Pesquisas | 30 August–3 September | 800 | 40% | 9.9% | 10.9% | 8.1% | —N/a | 4.1% | 3.6% | 1.8% | 5.1% (Note: Cida Borghetti (PP) with 2.3%; Carol Arns (PODE) with 1.6%; Renato Mocellin (PV) with 0.4%; Paulo Opuszka (PT) with 0.3%; Zé Boni (PTC) with 0.3%; Letícia Lanz (PSOL) with 0.1% and Eloy Casagrande with 0.1%) | 16.6% | 29.1% |
| Paraná Pesquisas | 30 August–3 September | 800 | 43.6% | 12.1% | —N/a | 10.1% | —N/a | 4.5% | 3.8% | 2.1% | 5.9% (Note: Cida Borghetti (PP) with 2.5%; Carol Arns (PODE) with 1.9%; Renato Mocellin (PV) with 0.5%; Letícia Lanz (PSOL) with 0.3%; Paulo Opuszka (PT) with 0.3%; Zé Boni (PTC) with 0.3% and Eloy Casagrande with 0.1%) | 18% | 31.5% |
| Ágili Pesquisas | 11–15 July | 1,352 | 38.11% | 9.29% | 6.3% | 6.14% | 3.78% | 3.15% | 2.05% | 1.89% | 4.87% (Note: Renato Mocellin (PV) with 1.57%; João Arruda (MDB) with 1.26%; Cida Borghetti (PP) with 1.1%; Paulo Opuszka (PT) with 0.63% and Carol Arns (PODE) with 0.31%) | 24.41% | 28.82% |
| Ágili Pesquisas | 11–15 July | 1,352 | 41.89% | 11.02% | —N/a | 8.03% | —N/a | —N/a | —N/a | 2.36% | 7.87% (Note: João Arruda (MDB) with 2.36%; Cida Borghetti (PP) with 2.2%; Renato Mocellin (PV) with 1.89%; Carol Arns (PODE) with 0.79% and Paulo Opuszka (PT) with 0.63%) | 28.82% | 30.87% |

=== 2019 ===
| Pollster/client(s) | Date(s) conducted | Sample size | Rafael Greca DEM | Ney Leprevost PSD | Gustavo Fruet PDT | Fernando Francischini PSL | Luciano Ducci PSB | Christiane Yared PL | Angelo Vanhoni PT | Luizão Goulart Republicans | Others | Abst. Undec. | Lead |
|---|---|---|---|---|---|---|---|---|---|---|---|---|---|
| Paraná Pesquisas | 11–13 December | 1,352 | 26.9% | 11.5% | 11.4% | 11.2% | 7.2% | 4.7% | 4.1% | 3.5% | 6.3% (Note: João Arruda (MDB) with 3%; Maria Victoria Barros (PP) with 2.1% and João Guilherme (NOVO) with 1.2%) | 13.4% | 15.4% |

== Rejection of candidates ==
=== 2020 ===
| Pollster/client(s) | Date(s) conducted | Francischini PSL | Greca DEM | Opuszka PT | Yared PL | Arruda MDB | Goura PDT | Zé Boni PTC | Lobo Avante | Carol PODE | João G. NOVO | Could vote in anyone | Others | Abst. Undec. |
|---|---|---|---|---|---|---|---|---|---|---|---|---|---|---|
| Ibope | 12–13 November | 36% | 20% | 16% | 10% | 8% | 7% | 6% | 6% | 5% | 5% | 7% | 27% (Note: Diogo Furtado (PCO) with 5%; Camila Lanes (PCdoB) with 5%; Letícia Lanz (PSOL) with 5%; Eloy Casagrande (REDE) with 4%; Samara Garratini (PSTU) with 4% and Renato Mocellin (PV) with 4%) | 20% |
| Opinião | 2–4 November | 30.19% | 17.85% | 15.94% | 12.95% | 13.03% | 10.42% | 10.42% | 10.19% | 10.27% | 9.04% | 18.85% | 52.88% (Note: Letícia Lanz (PSOL) with 9.43%; Samara Garratini (PSTU) with 9.04%; Camila Lanes (PCdoB) with 8.97%; Renato Mocellin (PV) with 8.89%; Diogo Furtado (PCO) with 8.66% and Eloy Casagrande (REDE) with 7.89%) | 18.85% |
| Ibope | 20–22 October | 33% | 18% | 11% | 13% | 12% | 9% | 10% | 8% | 7% | 5% | 5% | 39% (Note: Diogo Furtado (PCO) with 8%; Camila Lanes (PCdoB) with 7%; Letícia Lanz (PSOL) with 7%; Eloy Casagrande (REDE) with 6%; Samara Garratini (PSTU) with 6% and Renato Mocellin (PV) with 5%) | 25% |
| Ibope | 4–5 October | 21% | 20% | 5% | 9% | 11% | 8% | 10% | 8% | 6% | 4% | 7% | 27% (Note: Diogo Furtado (PCO) with 6%; Eloy Casagrande (REDE) with 5%; Camila Lanes (PCdoB) with 4%; Letícia Lanz (PSOL) with 4%; Renato Mocellin (PV) with 4% and Samara Garratini (PSTU) with 4%) | 27% |

== Results ==
=== Mayor ===
Source: G1

| Candidate | Running mate | Party | Votes | % |
|---|---|---|---|---|
| Rafael Greca (incumbent) | Eduardo Pimentel (PSD) | DEM | 499,821 | 59.75 |
| Goura Nataraj | Ana Lucia Moro | PDT | 110,977 | 13.27 |
| Fernando Francischini | Leticia Pan | PSL | 52,340 | 6.26 |
| João Guilherme | Geovana Conti | NOVO | 40,505 | 4.84 |
| Christiane Yared | Jilcy Rink | PL | 32,677 | 3.91 |
| Carol Arns | Rolf Koerner | PODE | 22,360 | 2.67 |
| João Arruda | Sheila Toledo | MDB | 21,833 | 2.61 |
| Paulo Opuszka | Pedro Felipe | PT | 20,537 | 2.46 |
| Marisa Lobo | Rômulo Quenehen | Avante | 18,547 | 2.22 |
| Renato Mocellin | Soraia Dill Pozo | PV | 6,305 | 0.75 |
| Letícia Lanz | Giana de Marco | PSOL | 3,564 | 0.43 |
| Zé Boni | Valdo Peres | PTC | 3,509 | 0.42 |
| Camila Lanes | José Ferreira Lopes | PCdoB | 1,881 | 0.22 |
| Eloy Casagrande | Michel Urânia | REDE | 1,021 | 0.12 |
| Samara Garratini | Samuel de Mattos | PSTU | 632 | 0.08 |
| Diogo Furtado | Feris Boabaid | PCO | 123 | |
| Total | | | 836,509 | 100.00 |
| Valid votes | | | 836,509 | 88.77 |
| Invalid votes | | | 58,780 | 6.24 |
| Blank votes | | | 47,055 | 4.99 |
| Total votes | | | 942,344 | 100.00 |
| Registered voters/turnout | | | 1,349,888 | 69.81 |
| DEM hold | | | | |

=== Results for mayor per electoral zones ===
Results by electoral zones
| Electoral Zones | Rafael Greca (DEM) | | Goura Nataraj (PDT) | | Fernando Francischini (PSL) | | João Guilherme (NOVO) | | Christiane Yared (PL) | | Carol Arns (PODE) | | João Arruda (MDB) | | Paulo Opuszka (PT) | | Marisa Lobo (Avante) | | Renato Mocellin (PV) | | Letícia Lanz (PSOL) | | Zé Boni (PTC) | | Camila Lanes (PCdoB) | | Eloy Casagrande (REDE) | | Samara Garratini (PSTU) | | Blank and invalid votes | | Abstentions | | Valid votes | | Total votes | | Electorate | |
| Electoral Zones | Votes | % | Votes | % | Votes | % | Votes | % | Votes | % | Votes | % | Votes | % | Votes | % | Votes | % | Votes | % | Votes | % | Votes | % | Votes | % | Votes | % | Votes | % | Votes | % | Votes | % | Votes | % | Votes | % | Voters | % |
|---|---|---|---|---|---|---|---|---|---|---|---|---|---|---|---|---|---|---|---|---|---|---|---|---|---|---|---|---|---|---|---|---|---|---|---|---|---|---|---|---|
| 1st electoral zone | 51,719 | 59.25 | 14,255 | 16.33 | 4,411 | 5.05 | 5,225 | 5.99 | 2,469 | 2.83 | 2,244 | 2.57 | 1,602 | 1.84 | 1,719 | 1.97 | 1,850 | 2.12 | 723 | 0.83 | 443 | 0.51 | 217 | 0.25 | 199 | 0.23 | 170 | 0.19 | 40 | 0.05 | 7,947 | 8.34 | 38,317 | 28.69 | 87,286 | 91.66 | 95,233 | 71.31 | 133,550 | 100 |
| 2nd electoral zone | 52,390 | 59.68 | 12,613 | 14.37 | 5,044 | 5.75 | 4,488 | 5.11 | 3,116 | 3.55 | 2,263 | 2.58 | 1,874 | 2.13 | 1,837 | 2.09 | 2,458 | 2.80 | 644 | 0.73 | 463 | 0.53 | 207 | 0.24 | 207 | 0.24 | 113 | 0.13 | 63 | 0.07 | 9,622 | 9.88 | 42,941 | 30.60 | 87,780 | 90.12 | 97,402 | 69.40 | 140,343 | 100 |
| 3rd electoral zone | 47,186 | 58.15 | 9,780 | 12.05 | 6,498 | 8.01 | 3,241 | 3.99 | 4,271 | 5.26 | 2,094 | 2.58 | 2,658 | 3.28 | 2,304 | 2.84 | 1,572 | 1.94 | 546 | 0.67 | 305 | 0.38 | 372 | 0.46 | 169 | 0.21 | 101 | 0.12 | 52 | 0.06 | 11,956 | 12.84 | 41,309 | 30.73 | 81,149 | 87.16 | 93,105 | 69.27 | 134,414 | 100 |
| 4th electoral zone | 51,685 | 60.72 | 11,075 | 13.01 | 5,107 | 6.00 | 4,133 | 4.86 | 3,530 | 4.15 | 2,187 | 2.57 | 1,995 | 2.34 | 1,944 | 2.28 | 1,959 | 2.30 | 581 | 0.68 | 329 | 0.39 | 310 | 0.36 | 141 | 0.17 | 89 | 0.10 | 51 | 0.06 | 10,789 | 11.25 | 39,983 | 29.42 | 85,116 | 88.75 | 95,905 | 70.58 | 135,888 | 100 |
| 145th electoral zone | 47,322 | 58.19 | 9,124 | 11.22 | 7,018 | 8.63 | 2,308 | 2.84 | 4,044 | 4.97 | 2,410 | 2.96 | 3,265 | 4.01 | 2,562 | 3.15 | 1,506 | 1.85 | 383 | 0.47 | 251 | 0.31 | 787 | 0.97 | 183 | 0.23 | 55 | 0.07 | 112 | 0.14 | 14,336 | 14.99 | 39,503 | 29.22 | 81,330 | 85.01 | 95,666 | 70.78 | 135,169 | 100 |
| 174th electoral zone | 48,972 | 58.73 | 10,942 | 13.12 | 5,677 | 6.81 | 3,677 | 4.41 | 3,556 | 4.26 | 2,341 | 2.81 | 2,458 | 2.95 | 2,074 | 2.49 | 2,068 | 2.48 | 648 | 0.78 | 313 | 0.38 | 335 | 0.40 | 157 | 0.19 | 88 | 0.11 | 76 | 0.09 | 10,642 | 11.32 | 41,258 | 30.50 | 83,382 | 88.68 | 94,024 | 69.50 | 135,282 | 100 |
| 175th electoral zone | 48,353 | 63.24 | 6,404 | 8.38 | 6,463 | 8.45 | 2,000 | 2.62 | 3,589 | 4.69 | 1,758 | 2.30 | 2,879 | 3.77 | 2,539 | 3.32 | 1,139 | 1.49 | 314 | 0.41 | 192 | 0.25 | 453 | 0.59 | 260 | 0.34 | 42 | 0.05 | 75 | 0.10 | 13,982 | 15.46 | 38,070 | 29.62 | 76,460 | 84.54 | 90,442 | 70.38 | 128,512 | 100 |
| 176th electoral zone | 48,261 | 61.10 | 9,900 | 12.53 | 4,608 | 5.83 | 3,264 | 4.13 | 3,303 | 4.18 | 2,207 | 2.79 | 2,002 | 2.53 | 1,952 | 2.47 | 1,867 | 2.36 | 635 | 0.80 | 282 | 0.36 | 387 | 0.49 | 182 | 0.23 | 74 | 0.09 | 62 | 0.08 | 10,422 | 11.66 | 37,159 | 29.36 | 78,986 | 88.34 | 89,408 | 70.64 | 126,567 | 100 |
| 177th electoral zone | 49,589 | 57.10 | 15,075 | 17.36 | 3,589 | 4.13 | 6,025 | 6.94 | 2,214 | 2.55 | 2,433 | 2.80 | 1,400 | 1.61 | 2,028 | 2.34 | 2,226 | 2.56 | 1,010 | 1.16 | 627 | 0.72 | 212 | 0.24 | 196 | 0.23 | 173 | 0.20 | 53 | 0.06 | 7,500 | 7.95 | 46,817 | 33.16 | 86,850 | 92.05 | 94,350 | 66.84 | 141,167 | 100 |
| 178th electoral zone | 54,344 | 61.64 | 11,809 | 13.39 | 3,925 | 4.45 | 6,144 | 6.97 | 2,585 | 2.93 | 2,423 | 2.75 | 1,700 | 1.93 | 1,578 | 1.79 | 1,902 | 2.16 | 821 | 0.93 | 359 | 0.41 | 229 | 0.26 | 187 | 0.21 | 116 | 0.13 | 48 | 0.05 | 8,762 | 9.04 | 42,064 | 30.26 | 88,170 | 90.96 | 96,932 | 69.74 | 138,996 | 100 |
| Total | 499,821 | 59.74 | 110,977 | 13.26 | 52,340 | 6.26 | 40,505 | 4.84 | 32,677 | 3.91 | 22,360 | 2.67 | 21,833 | 2.61 | 20,537 | 2.45 | 18,547 | 2.22 | 6,305 | 0.75 | 3,564 | 0.43 | 3,509 | 0.42 | 1,881 | 0.22 | 1,021 | 0.12 | 632 | 0.08 | 105,958 | 11.24 | 407,421 | 30.18 | 836,509 | 88.76 | 942,467 | 69.82 | 1,349,888 | 100 |
Source: G1 Eleições – Apuração por zona eleitoral (Curitiba/PR)

=== Results for mayor per neighborhoods ===
This is a table of results by neighborhoods in Curitiba. The only neighborhoods that do not have polling places are the neighborhoods of Cascatinha, Centro Cívico, Hugo Lange, Lamenha Pequena, Riviera, São João and São Miguel. The voters that live in these places usually tend to vote in other neighborhoods of the city.

Results by neighborhoods
| Neighborhoods of Curitiba | Rafael Greca (DEM) | | Goura Nataraj (PDT) | | Fernando Francischini (PSL) | | João Guilherme (NOVO) | | Christiane Yared (PL) | | Carol Arns (PODE) | | João Arruda (MDB) | | Paulo Opuszka (PT) | | Marisa Lobo (Avante) | | Renato Mocellin (PV) | | Letícia Lanz (PSOL) | | Zé Boni (PTC) | | Camila Lanes (PCdoB) | | Eloy Casagrande (REDE) | | Samara Garratini (PSTU) | | Blank votes | | Invalid votes | | Abstentions | | Valid votes | | Total votes | | Electorate | |
| Neighborhoods of Curitiba | Votes | % | Votes | % | Votes | % | Votes | % | Votes | % | Votes | % | Votes | % | Votes | % | Votes | % | Votes | % | Votes | % | Votes | % | Votes | % | Votes | % | Votes | % | Votes | % | Votes | % | Votes | % | Votes | % | Votes | % | Voters | % |
|---|---|---|---|---|---|---|---|---|---|---|---|---|---|---|---|---|---|---|---|---|---|---|---|---|---|---|---|---|---|---|---|---|---|---|---|---|---|---|---|---|---|---|
| Abranches | 4,424 | 61.95 | 952 | 13.33 | 520 | 7.28 | 310 | 4.34 | 253 | 3.54 | 169 | 2.37 | 160 | 2.24 | 137 | 1.92 | 104 | 1.46 | 33 | 0.46 | 37 | 0.52 | 10 | 0.14 | 14 | 0.20 | 13 | 0.18 | 5 | 0.07 | 411 | 5.10 | 499 | 6.20 | 2,680 | 24.97 | 7,141 | 88.70 | 8,051 | 75.03 | 10,731 | 100 |
| Água Verde | 15,738 | 58.76 | 4,315 | 16.11 | 935 | 3.49 | 2,289 | 8.55 | 547 | 2.04 | 827 | 3.09 | 349 | 1.30 | 423 | 1.58 | 692 | 2.58 | 339 | 1.27 | 152 | 0.57 | 32 | 0.12 | 74 | 0.28 | 60 | 0.22 | 11 | 0.04 | 789 | 2.76 | 1,057 | 3.69 | 12,918 | 31.09 | 26,783 | 93.55 | 28,629 | 68.91 | 41,547 | 100 |
| Ahú | 4,628 | 59.23 | 1,421 | 18.19 | 227 | 2.91 | 609 | 7.79 | 154 | 1.97 | 202 | 2.59 | 81 | 1.04 | 134 | 1.72 | 198 | 2.53 | 85 | 1.09 | 40 | 0.51 | 12 | 0.15 | 13 | 0.17 | 8 | 0.10 | 1 | 0.01 | 196 | 2.36 | 291 | 3.51 | 3,373 | 28.90 | 7,813 | 94.13 | 8,300 | 71.10 | 11,673 | 100 |
| Alto Boqueirão | 11,564 | 55.70 | 2,506 | 12.07 | 1,788 | 8.61 | 703 | 3.39 | 1,167 | 5.62 | 557 | 2.68 | 883 | 4.25 | 732 | 3.53 | 451 | 2.17 | 119 | 0.57 | 69 | 0.33 | 137 | 0.66 | 47 | 0.23 | 21 | 0.10 | 16 | 0.08 | 1,526 | 6.31 | 1,896 | 7.84 | 10,974 | 31.22 | 20,760 | 85.85 | 24,182 | 68.78 | 35,156 | 100 |
| Alto da Glória | 2,421 | 57.14 | 846 | 19.97 | 145 | 3.42 | 292 | 6.89 | 70 | 1.65 | 118 | 2.78 | 46 | 1.09 | 73 | 1.72 | 101 | 2.38 | 49 | 1.16 | 40 | 0.94 | 4 | 0.09 | 17 | 0.40 | 9 | 0.21 | 6 | 0.14 | 89 | 1.99 | 138 | 3.09 | 2,197 | 32.98 | 4,237 | 94.91 | 4,464 | 67.02 | 6,661 | 100 |
| Alto da Rua XV | 2,252 | 54.19 | 892 | 21.46 | 157 | 3.78 | 316 | 7.60 | 90 | 2.17 | 77 | 1.85 | 48 | 1.15 | 106 | 2.55 | 121 | 2.91 | 46 | 1.11 | 25 | 0.60 | 13 | 0.31 | 5 | 0.12 | 8 | 0.19 | 0 | 0.00 | 115 | 2.59 | 177 | 3.98 | 2,270 | 33.79 | 4,156 | 93.44 | 4,448 | 66.21 | 6,718 | 100 |
| Atuba | 2,948 | 61.73 | 487 | 10.20 | 330 | 6.91 | 174 | 3.64 | 212 | 4.44 | 114 | 2.39 | 154 | 3.22 | 106 | 2.22 | 180 | 3.77 | 29 | 0.61 | 17 | 0.36 | 13 | 0.27 | 4 | 0.08 | 5 | 0.10 | 3 | 0.06 | 345 | 6.27 | 381 | 6.92 | 2,199 | 28.55 | 4,776 | 86.80 | 5,502 | 71.45 | 7,701 | 100 |
| Augusta | 1,072 | 63.66 | 141 | 8.37 | 154 | 9.14 | 44 | 2.61 | 78 | 4.63 | 35 | 2.08 | 60 | 3.56 | 47 | 2.79 | 17 | 1.01 | 3 | 0.18 | 8 | 0.48 | 20 | 1.19 | 4 | 0.24 | 0 | 0.00 | 1 | 0.06 | 132 | 6.65 | 170 | 8.56 | 738 | 27.09 | 1,684 | 84.79 | 1,986 | 72.91 | 2,724 | 100 |
| Bacacheri | 9,817 | 59.58 | 2,733 | 16.59 | 727 | 4.41 | 926 | 5.62 | 457 | 2.77 | 409 | 2.48 | 263 | 1.60 | 298 | 1.81 | 493 | 2.99 | 157 | 0.95 | 78 | 0.47 | 36 | 0.22 | 43 | 0.26 | 27 | 0.16 | 14 | 0.08 | 589 | 3.29 | 844 | 4.71 | 7,590 | 29.76 | 16,478 | 92.00 | 17,911 | 70.24 | 25,501 | 100 |
| Bairro Alto | 11,587 | 58.25 | 2,684 | 13.49 | 1,422 | 7.15 | 824 | 4.14 | 923 | 4.64 | 503 | 2.53 | 512 | 2.57 | 494 | 2.48 | 580 | 2.92 | 116 | 0.58 | 106 | 0.53 | 53 | 0.27 | 59 | 0.30 | 12 | 0.06 | 17 | 0.09 | 1,192 | 5.26 | 1,564 | 6.91 | 10,281 | 31.22 | 19,892 | 87.83 | 22,648 | 68.78 | 32,929 | 100 |
| Barreirinha | 5,758 | 59.39 | 1,407 | 14.51 | 670 | 6.91 | 399 | 4.12 | 379 | 3.91 | 245 | 2.53 | 267 | 2.75 | 219 | 2.26 | 168 | 1.73 | 64 | 0.66 | 39 | 0.40 | 39 | 0.40 | 27 | 0.28 | 13 | 0.13 | 1 | 0.01 | 518 | 4.73 | 728 | 6.65 | 3,984 | 26.69 | 9,695 | 88.61 | 10,941 | 73.31 | 14,925 | 100 |
| Batel | 7,651 | 60.49 | 1,772 | 14.01 | 485 | 3.83 | 1,239 | 9.80 | 210 | 1.66 | 334 | 2.64 | 145 | 1.15 | 187 | 1.48 | 327 | 2.59 | 168 | 1.33 | 61 | 0.48 | 17 | 0.13 | 20 | 0.16 | 30 | 0.24 | 2 | 0.02 | 345 | 2.57 | 413 | 3.08 | 6,867 | 33.87 | 12,648 | 94.35 | 13,406 | 66.13 | 20,273 | 100 |
| Bigorrilho | 3,240 | 60.71 | 829 | 15.53 | 166 | 3.11 | 469 | 8.79 | 82 | 1.54 | 148 | 2.77 | 53 | 0.99 | 67 | 1.26 | 147 | 2.75 | 74 | 1.39 | 32 | 0.60 | 11 | 0.21 | 6 | 0.11 | 12 | 0.22 | 1 | 0.02 | 127 | 2.24 | 194 | 3.43 | 3,061 | 35.11 | 5,337 | 94.33 | 5,658 | 64.89 | 8,719 | 100 |
| Boa Vista | 7,983 | 59.42 | 2,133 | 15.88 | 714 | 5.31 | 747 | 5.56 | 423 | 3.15 | 377 | 2.81 | 276 | 2.05 | 256 | 1.91 | 270 | 2.01 | 93 | 0.69 | 88 | 0.66 | 12 | 0.09 | 33 | 0.25 | 18 | 0.13 | 12 | 0.09 | 549 | 3.72 | 775 | 5.25 | 7,122 | 32.55 | 13,435 | 91.03 | 14,759 | 67.45 | 21,881 | 100 |
| Bom Retiro | 3,994 | 58.42 | 1,222 | 17.87 | 310 | 4.53 | 459 | 6.71 | 150 | 2.19 | 182 | 2.66 | 84 | 1.23 | 103 | 1.51 | 181 | 2.65 | 53 | 0.78 | 49 | 0.72 | 13 | 0.19 | 14 | 0.20 | 19 | 0.28 | 4 | 0.06 | 191 | 2.60 | 326 | 4.43 | 3,139 | 29.92 | 6,837 | 92.97 | 7,354 | 70.08 | 10,493 | 100 |
| Boqueirão | 21,343 | 59.22 | 4,595 | 12.75 | 2,443 | 6.78 | 1,571 | 4.36 | 1,529 | 4.24 | 1,063 | 2.95 | 1,024 | 2.84 | 835 | 2.32 | 978 | 2.71 | 271 | 0.75 | 121 | 0.34 | 129 | 0.36 | 72 | 0.20 | 38 | 0.11 | 31 | 0.09 | 2,006 | 4.95 | 2,479 | 6.12 | 17,549 | 30.22 | 36,043 | 88.93 | 40,528 | 69.78 | 58,077 | 100 |
| Butiatuvinha | 2,977 | 61.67 | 528 | 10.94 | 323 | 6.69 | 234 | 4.85 | 182 | 3.77 | 168 | 3.48 | 150 | 3.11 | 108 | 2.24 | 69 | 1.43 | 29 | 0.60 | 12 | 0.25 | 25 | 0.52 | 13 | 0.27 | 3 | 0.06 | 6 | 0.12 | 332 | 5.97 | 401 | 7.21 | 2,019 | 26.64 | 4,827 | 86.82 | 5,560 | 73.36 | 7,579 | 100 |
| Cabral | 2,940 | 58.60 | 878 | 17.50 | 187 | 3.73 | 394 | 7.85 | 86 | 1.71 | 139 | 2.77 | 67 | 1.34 | 86 | 1.71 | 136 | 2.71 | 37 | 0.74 | 37 | 0.74 | 8 | 0.16 | 9 | 0.18 | 10 | 0.20 | 3 | 0.06 | 112 | 2.12 | 164 | 3.10 | 2,435 | 31.51 | 5,017 | 94.79 | 5,293 | 68.49 | 7,728 | 100 |
| Cachoeira | 1,148 | 55.33 | 259 | 12.48 | 203 | 9.78 | 61 | 2.94 | 131 | 6.31 | 66 | 3.18 | 76 | 3.66 | 68 | 3.28 | 24 | 1.16 | 10 | 0.48 | 2 | 0.10 | 9 | 0.43 | 12 | 0.58 | 4 | 0.19 | 2 | 0.10 | 180 | 7.48 | 153 | 6.35 | 991 | 29.16 | 2,075 | 86.17 | 2,408 | 70.84 | 3,399 | 100 |
| Cajuru | 22,815 | 58.48 | 4,368 | 11.20 | 3,394 | 8.70 | 1,472 | 3.77 | 2,111 | 5.41 | 974 | 2.50 | 1,401 | 3.59 | 1,066 | 2.73 | 672 | 1.72 | 268 | 0.69 | 126 | 0.32 | 202 | 0.52 | 88 | 0.23 | 37 | 0.09 | 21 | 0.05 | 2,804 | 6.25 | 3,036 | 6.77 | 19,456 | 30.25 | 39,015 | 86.98 | 44,855 | 69.75 | 64,311 | 100 |
| Campina do Siqueira | 39 | 39.39 | 27 | 27.27 | 1 | 1.01 | 12 | 12.12 | 1 | 1.01 | 4 | 4.04 | 3 | 3.03 | 1 | 1.01 | 2 | 2.02 | 3 | 3.03 | 5 | 5.05 | 1 | 1.01 | 0 | 0.00 | 0 | 0.00 | 0 | 0.00 | 4 | 3.81 | 2 | 1.90 | 32 | 23.36 | 99 | 94.29 | 105 | 76.64 | 137 | 100 |
| Campo Comprido | 4,165 | 59.75 | 1,034 | 14.83 | 316 | 4.53 | 405 | 5.81 | 273 | 3.92 | 185 | 2.65 | 151 | 2.17 | 163 | 2.34 | 162 | 2.32 | 41 | 0.59 | 35 | 0.50 | 13 | 0.19 | 16 | 0.23 | 9 | 0.13 | 3 | 0.04 | 370 | 4.74 | 458 | 5.87 | 3,180 | 28.96 | 6,971 | 89.38 | 7,799 | 71.04 | 10,979 | 100 |
| Campo de Santana | 6,634 | 62.90 | 817 | 7.75 | 963 | 9.13 | 249 | 2.36 | 465 | 4.41 | 243 | 2.30 | 444 | 4.21 | 334 | 3.17 | 140 | 1.33 | 83 | 0.79 | 35 | 0.33 | 70 | 0.66 | 59 | 0.56 | 2 | 0.02 | 9 | 0.09 | 1,164 | 9.11 | 1,069 | 8.36 | 5,641 | 30.62 | 10,547 | 82.53 | 12,780 | 69.38 | 18,421 | 100 |
| Capão da Imbuia | 7,094 | 59.15 | 1,638 | 13.66 | 722 | 6.02 | 452 | 3.77 | 628 | 5.24 | 328 | 2.73 | 340 | 2.83 | 296 | 2.47 | 283 | 2.36 | 68 | 0.57 | 50 | 0.42 | 33 | 0.28 | 24 | 0.20 | 26 | 0.22 | 11 | 0.09 | 625 | 4.64 | 843 | 6.26 | 6,129 | 31.29 | 11,993 | 89.09 | 13,461 | 68.71 | 19,590 | 100 |
| Capão Raso | 10,926 | 62.09 | 2,308 | 13.12 | 954 | 5.42 | 685 | 3.89 | 718 | 4.08 | 471 | 2.68 | 403 | 2.29 | 411 | 2.34 | 345 | 1.96 | 165 | 0.94 | 45 | 0.26 | 89 | 0.51 | 40 | 0.23 | 24 | 0.14 | 12 | 0.07 | 1,009 | 5.06 | 1,336 | 6.70 | 8,115 | 28.92 | 17,596 | 88.24 | 19,941 | 71.08 | 28,056 | 100 |
| Caximba | 1,194 | 75.57 | 82 | 5.19 | 89 | 5.63 | 17 | 1.08 | 43 | 2.72 | 41 | 2.59 | 38 | 2.41 | 35 | 2.22 | 10 | .63 | 1 | 0.06 | 0 | 0.00 | 23 | 1.46 | 6 | 0.38 | 0 | 0.00 | 1 | 0.06 | 114 | 6.37 | 97 | 5.42 | 688 | 27.75 | 1,580 | 88.22 | 1,791 | 72.25 | 2,479 | 100 |
| Centro | 9,918 | 52.77 | 4,235 | 22.53 | 760 | 4.04 | 1,119 | 5.95 | 415 | 2.21 | 454 | 2.42 | 270 | 1.44 | 546 | 2.91 | 467 | 2.48 | 227 | 1.21 | 216 | 1.15 | 42 | 0.22 | 56 | 0.30 | 46 | 0.24 | 24 | 0.13 | 609 | 3.00 | 886 | 4.37 | 12,029 | 37.22 | 18,795 | 92.63 | 20,290 | 62.78 | 32,319 | 100 |
| Cidade Industrial de Curitiba | 51,598 | 61.98 | 8,513 | 10.23 | 6,283 | 7.55 | 2,887 | 3.47 | 4,142 | 4.98 | 1,875 | 2.25 | 2,621 | 3.15 | 2,515 | 3.02 | 1,564 | 1.88 | 378 | 0.45 | 233 | 0.28 | 368 | 0.44 | 183 | 0.22 | 51 | 0.06 | 45 | 0.05 | 6,169 | 6.37 | 7,403 | 7.65 | 39,433 | 28.94 | 83,256 | 85.98 | 96,828 | 71.06 | 136,261 | 100 |
| Cristo Rei | 5,546 | 57.84 | 1,794 | 18.71 | 310 | 3.23 | 709 | 7.39 | 226 | 2.36 | 222 | 2.32 | 105 | 1.1 | 177 | 1.85 | 250 | 2.61 | 122 | 1.27 | 61 | 0.64 | 26 | 0.27 | 11 | 0.11 | 28 | 0.29 | 2 | 0.02 | 271 | 2.64 | 393 | 3.83 | 4,923 | 32.44 | 9,589 | 93.52 | 10,253 | 67.56 | 15,176 | 100 |
| Fanny | 3,593 | 60.03 | 820 | 13.70 | 318 | 5.31 | 319 | 5.33 | 208 | 3.48 | 200 | 3.34 | 137 | 2.29 | 135 | 2.26 | 128 | 2.14 | 49 | 0.82 | 23 | 0.38 | 29 | 0.48 | 15 | 0.25 | 6 | 0.10 | 5 | 0.08 | 310 | 4.61 | 436 | 6.48 | 2,695 | 28.59 | 5,985 | 88.92 | 6,731 | 71.41 | 9,426 | 100 |
| Fazendinha | 6,748 | 61.33 | 1,386 | 12.60 | 697 | 6.33 | 413 | 3.75 | 538 | 4.89 | 264 | 2.40 | 292 | 2.65 | 259 | 2.35 | 241 | 2.19 | 62 | 0.56 | 36 | 0.33 | 27 | 0.25 | 19 | 0.17 | 12 | 0.11 | 9 | 0.08 | 641 | 5.13 | 846 | 6.77 | 5,274 | 29.69 | 11,003 | 88.09 | 12,490 | 70.31 | 17,764 | 100 |
| Ganchinho | 470 | 67.72 | 52 | 7.49 | 41 | 5.91 | 18 | 2.59 | 25 | 3.60 | 19 | 2.74 | 32 | 4.61 | 21 | 3.03 | 9 | 1.30 | 2 | 0.29 | 1 | 0.14 | 3 | 0.43 | 0 | 0.00 | 0 | 0.00 | 1 | 0.14 | 64 | 7.97 | 45 | 5.60 | 429 | 34.82 | 694 | 86.43 | 803 | 65.18 | 1,232 | 100 |
| Guabirotuba | 3,263 | 59.44 | 798 | 14.54 | 277 | 5.05 | 339 | 6.17 | 170 | 3.10 | 168 | 3.06 | 98 | 1.79 | 112 | 2.04 | 155 | 2.82 | 60 | 1.09 | 19 | 0.35 | 11 | 0.20 | 9 | 0.16 | 8 | 0.15 | 3 | 0.05 | 214 | 3.57 | 296 | 4.93 | 2,605 | 30.27 | 5,490 | 91.50 | 6,000 | 69.73 | 8,605 | 100 |
| Guaíra | 6,369 | 62.23 | 1,300 | 12.70 | 565 | 5.52 | 480 | 4.69 | 375 | 3.66 | 300 | 2.93 | 200 | 1.95 | 246 | 2.40 | 211 | 2.06 | 80 | 0.78 | 51 | 0.50 | 29 | 0.28 | 19 | 0.19 | 6 | 0.06 | 4 | 0.04 | 583 | 5.03 | 780 | 6.73 | 5,095 | 30.52 | 10,235 | 88.25 | 11,598 | 69.48 | 16,693 | 100 |
| Hauer | 7,036 | 61.65 | 1,490 | 13.06 | 738 | 6.47 | 454 | 3.98 | 429 | 3.76 | 315 | 2.76 | 292 | 2.56 | 225 | 1.97 | 229 | 2.01 | 86 | 0.75 | 56 | 0.49 | 23 | 0.20 | 17 | 0.15 | 9 | 0.08 | 14 | 0.12 | 597 | 4.66 | 792 | 6.19 | 5,231 | 29.01 | 11,413 | 89.15 | 12,802 | 70.99 | 18,033 | 100 |
| Jardim Botânico | 1,724 | 58.30 | 455 | 15.39 | 111 | 3.75 | 218 | 7.37 | 94 | 3.18 | 76 | 2.57 | 55 | 1.86 | 92 | 3.11 | 72 | 2.43 | 30 | 1.01 | 15 | 0.51 | 6 | 0.20 | 4 | 0.14 | 3 | 0.10 | 2 | 0.07 | 104 | 3.22 | 169 | 5.23 | 1,546 | 32.37 | 2,957 | 91.55 | 3,230 | 67.63 | 4,776 | 100 |
| Jardim das Américas | 5,296 | 58.96 | 1,501 | 16.71 | 390 | 4.34 | 592 | 6.59 | 236 | 2.63 | 219 | 2.44 | 129 | 1.44 | 149 | 1.66 | 246 | 2.74 | 110 | 1.22 | 47 | 0.52 | 32 | 0.36 | 12 | 0.13 | 12 | 0.13 | 11 | 0.12 | 312 | 3.21 | 415 | 4.27 | 4,470 | 31.53 | 8,982 | 92.51 | 9,709 | 68.47 | 14,179 | 100 |
| Jardim Social | 4,028 | 58.68 | 1,094 | 15.94 | 287 | 4.18 | 547 | 7.97 | 131 | 1.91 | 189 | 2.75 | 86 | 1.25 | 111 | 1.62 | 218 | 3.18 | 94 | 1.37 | 38 | 0.55 | 15 | 0.22 | 12 | 0.17 | 12 | 0.17 | 2 | 0.03 | 207 | 2.81 | 300 | 4.07 | 3,099 | 29.60 | 6,864 | 93.12 | 7,371 | 70.40 | 10,470 | 100 |
| Juvevê | 5,807 | 57.83 | 1,950 | 19.42 | 323 | 3.22 | 809 | 8.06 | 159 | 1.58 | 253 | 2.52 | 101 | 1.01 | 144 | 1.43 | 249 | 2.48 | 110 | 1.10 | 71 | 0.71 | 14 | 0.14 | 21 | 0.21 | 23 | 0.23 | 7 | 0.07 | 230 | 2.17 | 326 | 3.08 | 4,524 | 29.92 | 10,041 | 94.75 | 10,597 | 70.08 | 15,121 | 100 |
| Lindóia | 1,418 | 62.17 | 269 | 11.79 | 149 | 6.53 | 92 | 4.03 | 109 | 4.78 | 71 | 3.11 | 45 | 1.97 | 52 | 2.28 | 38 | 1.67 | 12 | 0.53 | 12 | 0.53 | 5 | 0.22 | 6 | 0.26 | 1 | 0.04 | 2 | 0.09 | 133 | 5.14 | 174 | 6.72 | 1,055 | 28.96 | 2,281 | 88.14 | 2,588 | 71.04 | 3,643 | 100 |
| Mercês | 6,842 | 60.90 | 1,714 | 15.26 | 420 | 3.74 | 894 | 7.96 | 211 | 1.88 | 304 | 2.71 | 133 | 1.18 | 205 | 1.82 | 277 | 2.47 | 122 | 1.09 | 43 | 0.38 | 20 | 0.18 | 14 | 0.12 | 35 | 0.31 | 1 | 0.01 | 324 | 2.69 | 471 | 3.92 | 4,861 | 28.78 | 11,235 | 93.39 | 12,030 | 71.22 | 16,891 | 100 |
| Mossunguê | 1,706 | 62.84 | 302 | 11.12 | 103 | 3.79 | 263 | 9.69 | 54 | 1.99 | 74 | 2.73 | 33 | 1.22 | 34 | 1.25 | 91 | 3.35 | 29 | 1.07 | 9 | 0.33 | 6 | 0.22 | 8 | 0.29 | 1 | 0.04 | 2 | 0.07 | 75 | 2.58 | 115 | 3.96 | 1,272 | 30.45 | 2,715 | 93.46 | 2,905 | 69.55 | 4,177 | 100 |
| Novo Mundo | 12,841 | 61.37 | 2,698 | 12.89 | 1,146 | 5.48 | 873 | 4.17 | 810 | 3.87 | 562 | 2.69 | 548 | 2.62 | 474 | 2.27 | 517 | 2.47 | 168 | 0.80 | 89 | 0.43 | 114 | 0.54 | 42 | 0.20 | 21 | 0.10 | 21 | 0.10 | 1,105 | 4.69 | 1,529 | 6.49 | 9,702 | 29.17 | 20,924 | 88.82 | 23,558 | 70.83 | 33,260 | 100 |
| Orleans | 2,776 | 62.92 | 591 | 13.40 | 191 | 4.33 | 293 | 6.64 | 126 | 2.86 | 120 | 2.72 | 87 | 1.97 | 79 | 1.79 | 80 | 1.81 | 40 | 0.91 | 10 | 0.23 | 6 | 0.14 | 6 | 0.14 | 2 | 0.05 | 5 | 0.11 | 197 | 4.02 | 291 | 5.94 | 1,888 | 27.81 | 4,412 | 90.04 | 4,900 | 72.19 | 6,788 | 100 |
| Parolin | 1,473 | 60.84 | 282 | 11.65 | 158 | 6.53 | 73 | 3.02 | 95 | 3.92 | 80 | 3.30 | 75 | 3.1 | 92 | 3.80 | 47 | 1.94 | 11 | 0.45 | 6 | 0.25 | 19 | 0.78 | 5 | 0.21 | 3 | 0.12 | 2 | 0.08 | 164 | 5.86 | 214 | 7.65 | 1,370 | 32.86 | 2,421 | 86.50 | 2,799 | 67.14 | 4,169 | 100 |
| Pilarzinho | 6,396 | 59.98 | 1,354 | 12.70 | 789 | 7.40 | 382 | 3.58 | 513 | 4.81 | 260 | 2.44 | 294 | 2.76 | 289 | 2.71 | 183 | 1.72 | 55 | 0.52 | 34 | 0.32 | 59 | 0.55 | 35 | 0.33 | 13 | 0.12 | 7 | 0.07 | 664 | 5.50 | 750 | 6.21 | 4,630 | 27.71 | 10,663 | 88.29 | 12,077 | 72.29 | 16,707 | 100 |
| Pinheirinho | 14,201 | 59.18 | 2,546 | 10.61 | 1,933 | 8.06 | 715 | 2.98 | 1,201 | 5.00 | 764 | 3.18 | 846 | 3.53 | 857 | 3.57 | 421 | 1.75 | 136 | 0.57 | 83 | 0.35 | 162 | 0.68 | 53 | 0.22 | 15 | 0.06 | 64 | 0.27 | 1,803 | 6.45 | 2,165 | 7.74 | 11,511 | 29.16 | 23,997 | 85.81 | 27,965 | 70.84 | 39,476 | 100 |
| Portão | 15,234 | 60.28 | 3,831 | 15.16 | 1,081 | 4.28 | 1,588 | 6.28 | 755 | 2.99 | 675 | 2.67 | 434 | 1.72 | 469 | 1.86 | 631 | 2.50 | 281 | 1.11 | 116 | 0.46 | 83 | 0.33 | 29 | 0.11 | 47 | 0.19 | 18 | 0.07 | 929 | 3.37 | 1,364 | 4.95 | 11,886 | 30.13 | 25,272 | 91.68 | 27,565 | 69.87 | 39,451 | 100 |
| Prado Velho | 1,863 | 56.57 | 369 | 11.21 | 181 | 5.50 | 272 | 8.26 | 128 | 3.89 | 81 | 2.46 | 114 | 3.46 | 152 | 4.62 | 68 | 2.06 | 28 | 0.85 | 13 | 0.39 | 12 | 0.36 | 9 | 0.27 | 2 | 0.06 | 1 | 0.03 | 203 | 5.41 | 258 | 6.87 | 2,060 | 35.43 | 3,293 | 87.72 | 3,754 | 64.57 | 5,814 | 100 |
| Rebouças | 4,630 | 55.13 | 1,509 | 17.97 | 368 | 4.38 | 537 | 6.39 | 241 | 2.87 | 275 | 3.27 | 153 | 1.82 | 203 | 2.42 | 255 | 3.04 | 107 | 1.27 | 70 | 0.83 | 20 | 0.24 | 14 | 0.17 | 12 | 0.14 | 5 | 0.06 | 258 | 2.85 | 397 | 4.38 | 4,843 | 34.85 | 8,399 | 92.77 | 9,054 | 65.15 | 13,897 | 100 |
| Santa Cândida | 9,753 | 61.23 | 1,865 | 11.71 | 1,071 | 6.72 | 638 | 4.01 | 719 | 4.51 | 390 | 2.45 | 410 | 2.57 | 391 | 2.45 | 427 | 2.68 | 85 | 0.53 | 69 | 0.43 | 48 | 0.30 | 35 | 0.22 | 18 | 0.11 | 9 | 0.06 | 939 | 5.23 | 1,099 | 6.12 | 7,623 | 29.79 | 15,928 | 88.66 | 17,966 | 70.21 | 25,589 | 100 |
| Santa Felicidade | 12,770 | 61.50 | 2,691 | 12.96 | 1,100 | 5.30 | 1,172 | 5.64 | 744 | 3.58 | 625 | 3.01 | 467 | 2.25 | 389 | 1.87 | 405 | 1.95 | 157 | 0.76 | 87 | 0.42 | 74 | 0.36 | 52 | 0.25 | 17 | 0.08 | 13 | 0.06 | 981 | 4.25 | 1,352 | 5.85 | 9,301 | 28.71 | 20,763 | 89.90 | 23,096 | 71.29 | 32,397 | 100 |
| Santa Quitéria | 6,571 | 61.27 | 1,526 | 14.23 | 511 | 4.76 | 531 | 4.95 | 358 | 3.34 | 312 | 2.91 | 242 | 2.26 | 228 | 2.13 | 259 | 2.41 | 63 | 0.59 | 43 | 0.40 | 40 | 0.37 | 23 | 0.21 | 8 | 0.07 | 10 | 0.09 | 445 | 3.75 | 704 | 5.93 | 4,863 | 29.06 | 10,725 | 90.32 | 11,874 | 70.94 | 16,737 | 100 |
| Santo Inácio | 5,133 | 63.26 | 1,124 | 13.85 | 290 | 3.57 | 563 | 6.94 | 219 | 2.70 | 204 | 2.51 | 118 | 1.45 | 150 | 1.85 | 154 | 1.90 | 72 | 0.89 | 34 | 0.42 | 23 | 0.28 | 11 | 0.14 | 14 | 0.17 | 5 | 0.06 | 299 | 3.39 | 412 | 4.67 | 4,459 | 33.57 | 8,114 | 91.94 | 8,825 | 66.43 | 13,284 | 100 |
| São Braz | 4,927 | 60.92 | 916 | 11.33 | 493 | 6.10 | 450 | 5.56 | 381 | 4.71 | 206 | 2.55 | 218 | 2.7 | 189 | 2.34 | 164 | 2.03 | 63 | 0.78 | 20 | 0.25 | 27 | 0.33 | 23 | 0.28 | 5 | 0.06 | 6 | 0.07 | 525 | 5.67 | 652 | 7.04 | 3,880 | 29.52 | 8,088 | 87.30 | 9,265 | 70.48 | 13,145 | 100 |
| São Francisco | 2,102 | 56.40 | 776 | 20.82 | 164 | 4.40 | 210 | 5.63 | 75 | 2.01 | 72 | 1.93 | 65 | 1.74 | 79 | 2.12 | 98 | 2.63 | 27 | 0.72 | 31 | 0.83 | 12 | 0.32 | 9 | 0.24 | 5 | 0.13 | 2 | 0.05 | 96 | 2.40 | 180 | 4.50 | 1,790 | 30.90 | 3,727 | 93.11 | 4,003 | 69.10 | 5,793 | 100 |
| São Lourenço | 3,423 | 57.89 | 1,152 | 19.48 | 257 | 4.35 | 340 | 5.75 | 133 | 2.25 | 172 | 2.91 | 89 | 1.51 | 114 | 1.93 | 124 | 2.10 | 46 | 0.78 | 19 | 0.32 | 11 | 0.19 | 9 | 0.15 | 22 | 0.37 | 2 | 0.03 | 151 | 2.38 | 269 | 4.25 | 2,378 | 27.30 | 5,913 | 93.37 | 6,333 | 72.70 | 8,711 | 100 |
| Seminário | 4,787 | 62.71 | 1,107 | 14.50 | 240 | 3.14 | 629 | 8.24 | 156 | 2.04 | 196 | 2.57 | 85 | 1.11 | 91 | 1.19 | 170 | 2.23 | 84 | 1.10 | 42 | 0.55 | 10 | 0.13 | 16 | 0.21 | 15 | 0.20 | 5 | 0.07 | 218 | 2.68 | 276 | 3.40 | 3,401 | 29.50 | 7,633 | 93.92 | 8,127 | 70.50 | 11,528 | 100 |
| Sítio Cercado | 28,019 | 56.86 | 5,782 | 11.73 | 4,500 | 9.13 | 1,400 | 2.84 | 2,480 | 5.03 | 1,355 | 2.75 | 2,140 | 4.34 | 1,538 | 3.12 | 955 | 1.94 | 202 | 0.41 | 148 | 0.30 | 575 | 1.17 | 109 | 0.22 | 36 | 0.07 | 39 | 0.08 | 4,144 | 7.10 | 4,946 | 8.47 | 24,711 | 29.74 | 49,278 | 84.43 | 58,368 | 70.26 | 83,079 | 100 |
| Taboão | 538 | 67.08 | 98 | 12.22 | 35 | 4.36 | 22 | 2.74 | 28 | 3.49 | 13 | 1.62 | 25 | 3.12 | 19 | 2.37 | 13 | 1.62 | 2 | 0.25 | 5 | 0.62 | 3 | 0.37 | 1 | 0.12 | 0 | 0.00 | 0 | 0.00 | 49 | 5.39 | 58 | 6.38 | 339 | 27.16 | 802 | 88.23 | 909 | 72.84 | 1,248 | 100 |
| Tarumã | 2,665 | 59.33 | 620 | 13.80 | 223 | 4.96 | 258 | 5.74 | 133 | 2.96 | 142 | 3.16 | 104 | 2.32 | 97 | 2.16 | 124 | 2.76 | 59 | 1.31 | 32 | 0.71 | 19 | 0.42 | 5 | 0.11 | 8 | 0.18 | 3 | 0.07 | 194 | 3.90 | 286 | 5.75 | 1,924 | 27.90 | 4,492 | 90.35 | 4,972 | 72.10 | 6,896 | 100 |
| Tatuquara | 13,172 | 63.62 | 1,464 | 7.07 | 1,929 | 9.32 | 557 | 2.69 | 809 | 3.91 | 574 | 2.77 | 884 | 4.27 | 654 | 3.16 | 282 | 1.36 | 56 | 0.27 | 49 | 0.24 | 144 | 0.70 | 83 | 0.40 | 14 | 0.07 | 32 | 0.15 | 1,947 | 7.88 | 2,051 | 8.30 | 10,830 | 30.48 | 20,703 | 83.81 | 24,701 | 69.52 | 35,531 | 100 |
| Tingui | 3,334 | 61.86 | 739 | 13.71 | 306 | 5.68 | 238 | 4.42 | 165 | 3.06 | 142 | 2.63 | 106 | 1.97 | 95 | 1.76 | 154 | 2.86 | 33 | 0.61 | 30 | 0.56 | 22 | 0.41 | 12 | 0.22 | 11 | 0.20 | 3 | 0.06 | 227 | 3.81 | 335 | 5.63 | 2,592 | 30.34 | 5,390 | 90.56 | 5,952 | 69.66 | 8,544 | 100 |
| Uberaba | 17,277 | 57.32 | 3,774 | 12.52 | 2,382 | 7.90 | 1,317 | 4.37 | 1,532 | 5.08 | 792 | 2.63 | 917 | 3.04 | 942 | 3.13 | 617 | 2.05 | 210 | 0.70 | 129 | 0.43 | 137 | 0.45 | 57 | 0.19 | 38 | 0.13 | 20 | 0.07 | 2,159 | 6.21 | 2,489 | 7.15 | 15,724 | 31.13 | 30,141 | 86.64 | 34,789 | 68.87 | 50,513 | 100 |
| Umbará | 5,102 | 63.34 | 796 | 9.88 | 585 | 7.26 | 193 | 2.40 | 363 | 4.51 | 291 | 3.61 | 279 | 3.46 | 167 | 2.07 | 130 | 1.61 | 45 | 0.56 | 20 | 0.25 | 50 | 0.62 | 21 | 0.26 | 4 | 0.05 | 9 | 0.11 | 624 | 6.69 | 654 | 7.01 | 3,281 | 26.01 | 8,055 | 86.31 | 9,333 | 73.99 | 12,614 | 100 |
| Vila Izabel | 1,988 | 59.01 | 607 | 18.02 | 80 | 2.37 | 262 | 7.78 | 88 | 2.61 | 85 | 2.52 | 49 | 1.45 | 62 | 1.84 | 85 | 2.52 | 29 | 0.86 | 13 | 0.39 | 4 | 0.12 | 11 | 0.33 | 5 | 0.15 | 1 | 0.03 | 98 | 2.71 | 151 | 4.17 | 1,404 | 27.96 | 3,369 | 93.12 | 3,618 | 72.04 | 5,022 | 100 |
| Vista Alegre | 3,209 | 61.35 | 706 | 13.50 | 273 | 5.22 | 290 | 5.54 | 162 | 3.10 | 158 | 3.02 | 156 | 2.98 | 92 | 1.76 | 85 | 1.62 | 50 | 0.96 | 27 | 0.52 | 6 | 0.11 | 11 | 0.21 | 4 | 0.08 | 2 | 0.04 | 216 | 3.75 | 313 | 5.43 | 2,331 | 28.81 | 5,231 | 90.82 | 5,760 | 71.19 | 8,091 | 100 |
| Xaxim | 17,923 | 60.13 | 3,507 | 11.77 | 1,937 | 6.50 | 1,197 | 4.02 | 1,379 | 4.63 | 832 | 2.79 | 821 | 2.75 | 817 | 2.74 | 803 | 2.69 | 219 | 0.73 | 105 | 0.35 | 149 | 0.50 | 75 | 0.25 | 21 | 0.07 | 21 | 0.07 | 1,743 | 5.14 | 2,370 | 6.99 | 14,531 | 29.99 | 29,806 | 87.87 | 33,919 | 70.01 | 48,450 | 100 |
| Total | 499,821 | 59.75 | 110,977 | 13.27 | 52,340 | 6.26 | 40,505 | 4.84 | 32,677 | 3.91 | 22,360 | 2.67 | 21,833 | 2.61 | 20,537 | 2.46 | 18,547 | 2.22 | 6,305 | 0.75 | 3,564 | 0.43 | 3,509 | 0.42 | 1,881 | 0.22 | 1,021 | 0.12 | 632 | 0.08 | 47,055 | 4.99 | 58,903 | 6.25 | 407,421 | 30.18 | 836,509 | 88.76 | 942,467 | 69.82 | 1,349,888 | 100 |
Source: 2020 Curitiba mayoral election (per neighborhoods and electoral sections)

Popular vote (first round)
| Greca | 59.75% |
| Nataraj | 13.27% |
| Francischini | 6.26% |
| Guilherme | 4.84% |
| Yared | 3.91% |
| Arns | 2.67% |
| Arruda | 2.61% |
| Opuszka | 2.46% |
| Lobo | 2.22% |
| Others | 2.01% |

=== Party composition of the Municipal Chamber of Curitiba ===
The major winning party in the election in Curitiba was the Democrats (DEM), the party of the incumbent mayor. The Workers' Party (PT) increased its party bench by two councillors. The Social Liberal Party (PSL), the same party of the president of Brazil at that time, Jair Bolsonaro, saw its bench go from zero to three councillors. The Brazilian Social Democracy Party (PSDB) had three councillors and after the election it did not elect any councillors. The result of the last municipal election and the current situation in the Municipal Chamber is given below:

| Party affiliation | Members | | +/– |
| Party affiliation | Elected in 2016 | Elected in 2020 | +/– |
|---|---|---|---|
| DEM | 2 | 5 | ▲3 |
| PSD | 4 | 4 | Steady |
| PSL | 0 | 3 | ▲3 |
| NOVO | 0 | 2 | ▲2 |
| PODE | didn't exist | 2 | ▲2 |
| PT | 1 | 3 | ▲2 |
| PP | 1 | 2 | ▲1 |
| Solidarity | 1 | 2 | ▲1 |
| Republicanos | 1 | 2 | ▲1 |
| Cidadania | 0 | 1 | ▲1 |
| DEMOCRATA | 0 | 1 | ▲1 |
| Patriota | didn't exist | 1 | ▲1 |
| PROS | 1 | 1 | Steady |
| DC | 2 | 1 | ▼1 |
| PV | 2 | 1 | ▼1 |
| PTB | 2 | 1 | ▼1 |
| MDB | 2 | 1 | ▼1 |
| PL | 1 | 0 | ▼1 |
| PPS | 1 | extinct party (Note: The Popular Socialist Party (PPS) changed its name to Cidadania in September 2019.) | ▼1 |
| PRP | 1 | extinct party (Note: The Progressive Republican Party (PRP) merged into Patriota in December 2018.) | ▼1 |
| PSC | 3 | 1 | ▼2 |
| PTN | 2 | extinct party (Note: The National Labour Party (PTN) changed its name to Podemos (PODE) in May 2017.) | ▼2 |
| PSB | 3 | 1 | ▼2 |
| PDT | 5 | 3 | ▼2 |
| PSDB | 3 | 0 | ▼3 |
| Total | 38 | | |

=== Votes by party ===
| Party | Votes | % | Seats | +/– |
|---|---|---|---|---|
| Democrats | 80,906 | 10.26 | 5 | ▲3 |
| Social Democratic Party | 58,892 | 7.47 | 4 | Steady |
| Social Liberal Party | 58,743 | 7.45 | 3 | ▲3 |
| Workers' Party | 49,125 | 6.23 | 3 | ▲2 |
| Democratic Labour Party | 47,613 | 6.04 | 3 | ▼2 |
| New Party | 43,417 | 5.51 | 2 | ▲2 |
| Progressistas | 35,347 | 4.48 | 2 | ▲1 |
| Podemos | 31,277 | 3.97 | 2 | ▲2 |
| Republicanos | 31,084 | 3.94 | 2 | ▲1 |
| Solidarity | 31,015 | 3.93 | 2 | ▲1 |
| Green Party | 28,113 | 3.57 | 1 | ▼1 |
| Brazilian Democratic Movement | 28,010 | 3.55 | 1 | ▼1 |
| Republican Party of the Social Order | 27,949 | 3.55 | 1 | Steady |
| Brazilian Labour Party | 25,979 | 3.30 | 1 | ▼1 |
| Brazilian Woman's Party | 25,162 | 3.19 | 1 | ▲1 |
| Cidadania | 21,158 | 2.68 | 1 | ▲1 |
| Patriota | 21,063 | 2.67 | 1 | ▲1 |
| Brazilian Socialist Party | 17,298 | 2.19 | 1 | ▼2 |
| Social Christian Party | 17,227 | 2.19 | 1 | ▼2 |
| Christian Democracy | 17,043 | 2.16 | 1 | ▼1 |
| Christian Labor Party | 16,399 | 2.08 | 0 | Steady |
| Socialism and Liberty Party | 13,123 | 1.66 | 0 | Steady |
| Party of National Mobilization | 13,096 | 1.66 | 0 | Steady |
| Brazilian Labour Renewal Party | 11,193 | 1.42 | 0 | Steady |
| Avante | 10,983 | 1.39 | 0 | Steady |
| Liberal Party | 9,698 | 1.23 | 0 | ▼1 |
| Brazilian Social Democracy Party | 9,169 | 1.16 | 0 | ▼3 |
| Communist Party of Brazil | 5,466 | 0.69 | 0 | Steady |
| Sustainability Network | 2,715 | 0.34 | 0 | Steady |
| Workers' Cause Party | 52 | | 0 | Steady |
| Total | 788,263 | 100.00 | 38 | – |
| Valid votes | 788,263 | 84.00 | | |
| Invalid votes | 83,465 | 8.89 | | |
| Blank votes | 66,682 | 7.11 | | |
| Total votes | 938,410 | 100.00 | | |
| Registered voters/turnout | 1,349,888 | 69.52 | | |
Source: UOL

=== Elected councillors ===
These are the elected councillors in the 2020 Curitiba city elections.

| Party affiliation | Councillor | Votes | % |
|---|---|---|---|
| New Party (NOVO) | Indiara Barbosa | 12,147 | 1.53 |
| Democrats (DEM) | Serginho do Posto | 10,061 | 1.27 |
| Workers' Party (PT) | Carol Dartora | 8,874 | 1.12 |
| Social Democratic Party (PSD) | Professor Euler | 8,315 | 1.05 |
| Social Democratic Party (PSD) | Beto Moraes | 8,243 | 1.04 |
| Republicanos | Osias Moraes | 7,837 | 0.99 |
| Brazilian Labour Party (PTB) | Pier | 7,495 | 0.95 |
| Podemos (PODE) | Denian Couto | 7,005 | 0.88 |
| Democrats (DEM) | Zezinho do Sabará | 6,466 | 0.82 |
| Cidadania | Herivelto Oliveira | 6,441 | 0.81 |
| Democrats (DEM) | Sabino Picolo | 6,061 | 0.76 |
| Workers' Party (PT) | Professora Josete | 5,856 | 0.74 |
| Democratic Labour Party (PDT) | Marcos Vieira | 5,826 | 0.74 |
| Democrats (DEM) | Mauro Ignácio | 5,755 | 0.73 |
| Social Christian Party (PSC) | Marcelo Fachinello | 5,326 | 0.67 |
| Workers' Party (PT) | Renato Freitas | 5,097 | 0.64 |
| Republican Party of the Social Order (PROS) | Tico Kuzma | 5,038 | 0.64 |
| Democrats (DEM) | Toninho da Farmacia | 4,853 | 0.61 |
| Democratic Labour Party (PDT) | Tito Zeglin | 4,747 | 0.60 |
| Social Liberal Party (PSL) | Flávia Francischini | 4,540 | 0.57 |
| Republicanos | Pastor Marciano Alves | 4,483 | 0.57 |
| Brazilian Democratic Movement (MDB) | Noemia Rocha | 4,439 | 0.56 |
| Democratic Labour Party (PDT) | Dalton Borba | 4,428 | 0.56 |
| Social Liberal Party (PSL) | João da Loja 5 Irmãos | 4,423 | 0.56 |
| Social Liberal Party (PSL) | Sargento Tânia Guerreiro | 4,422 | 0.56 |
| Solidarity | Alexandre Leprevost | 4,385 | 0.55 |
| Progressistas (PP) | Oscalino do Povo | 4,093 | 0.52 |
| Brazilian Woman's Party (PMB) | Ezequias Barros | 4,091 | 0.52 |
| Progressistas (PP) | Nori Seto | 4,085 | 0.52 |
| Green Party (PV) | Maria Leticia | 4,019 | 0.51 |
| Social Democratic Party (PSD) | Jornalista Márcio Barros | 3,946 | 0.50 |
| Social Democratic Party (PSD) | Eder Borges | 3,932 | 0.50 |
| Podemos (PODE) | Mauro Bobato | 3,892 | 0.49 |
| Patriota | Sidnei Toaldo | 3,618 | 0.46 |
| Brazilian Socialist Party (PSB) | Hernani | 3,136 | 0.40 |
| New Party (NOVO) | Amália Tortato | 3,092 | 0.39 |
| Solidarity | Leonidas Dias | 2,704 | 0.34 |
| Christian Democracy (DC) | Salles do Fazendinha | 2,527 | 0.32 |
