= Francischini =

Francischini is an Italian surname. Notable people with the surname include:

- Felipe Francischini (born 1991), Brazilian politician and lawyer
- Fernando Francischini (born 1970), Brazilian politician, father of Felipe
