= Roberto Requião =

Brazilian politician and journalist

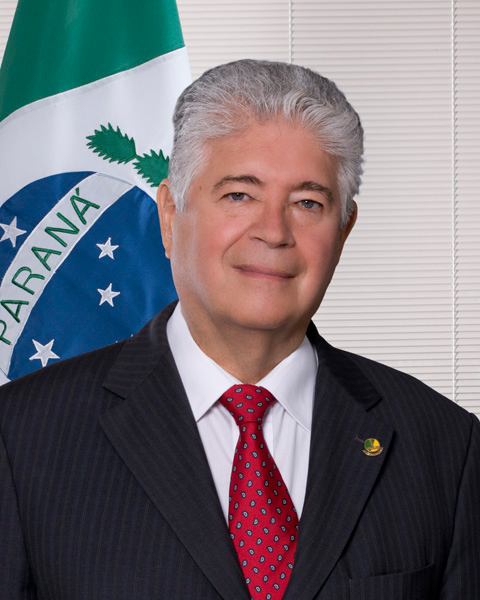
- Official portrait, 2015

Senator from Paraná
- In office February 1, 2011 – January 31, 2019
- In office February 1, 1995 – December 31, 2002

53th Governor of Paraná
- In office January 1, 2007 – April 1, 2010
- Preceded by: Hermas Brandão
- Succeeded by: Orlando Pessuti

53th Governor of Paraná
- In office January 1, 2003 – September 5, 2006
- Preceded by: Jaime Lerner
- Succeeded by: Hermas Brandão

50th Governor of Paraná
- In office March 15, 1991 – March 31, 1994
- Preceded by: Alvaro Dias
- Succeeded by: Mário Pereira

75th Mayor of Curitiba
- In office January 1, 1986 – January 1, 1989
- Preceded by: Mauricio Fruet
- Succeeded by: Jaime Lerner

State Deputy
- In office March 15, 1983 – January 1, 1986
- Constituency: Paraná

Personal details
- Born: March 5, 1941 (age 85) Curitiba, Paraná
- Party: PDT (2025–present)
- Other political affiliations: PMDB (1980–2021); PT (2022–2024); Mobiliza (2024)
- Children: Requião Filho
- Relatives: João Arruda (nephew)
- Profession: Journalist

Roberto Requião de Mello e Silva (born March 5, 1941) is a Brazilian politician and journalist. He has represented Paraná in the Federal Senate two times, between 1995 and 2002 and from 2011 to 2019. Previously, he was governor of Paraná from 2003 to 2010. He was a member of the Brazilian Democratic Movement Party from 1980 to 2022, when he decided to leave the party to join the Workers' Party in order to run in the 2022 Paraná gubernatorial election. In April 2024, he left the Workers' Party in order to join the National Mobilization.
