= Flávia Francischini =

Brazilian politician (born 1978)

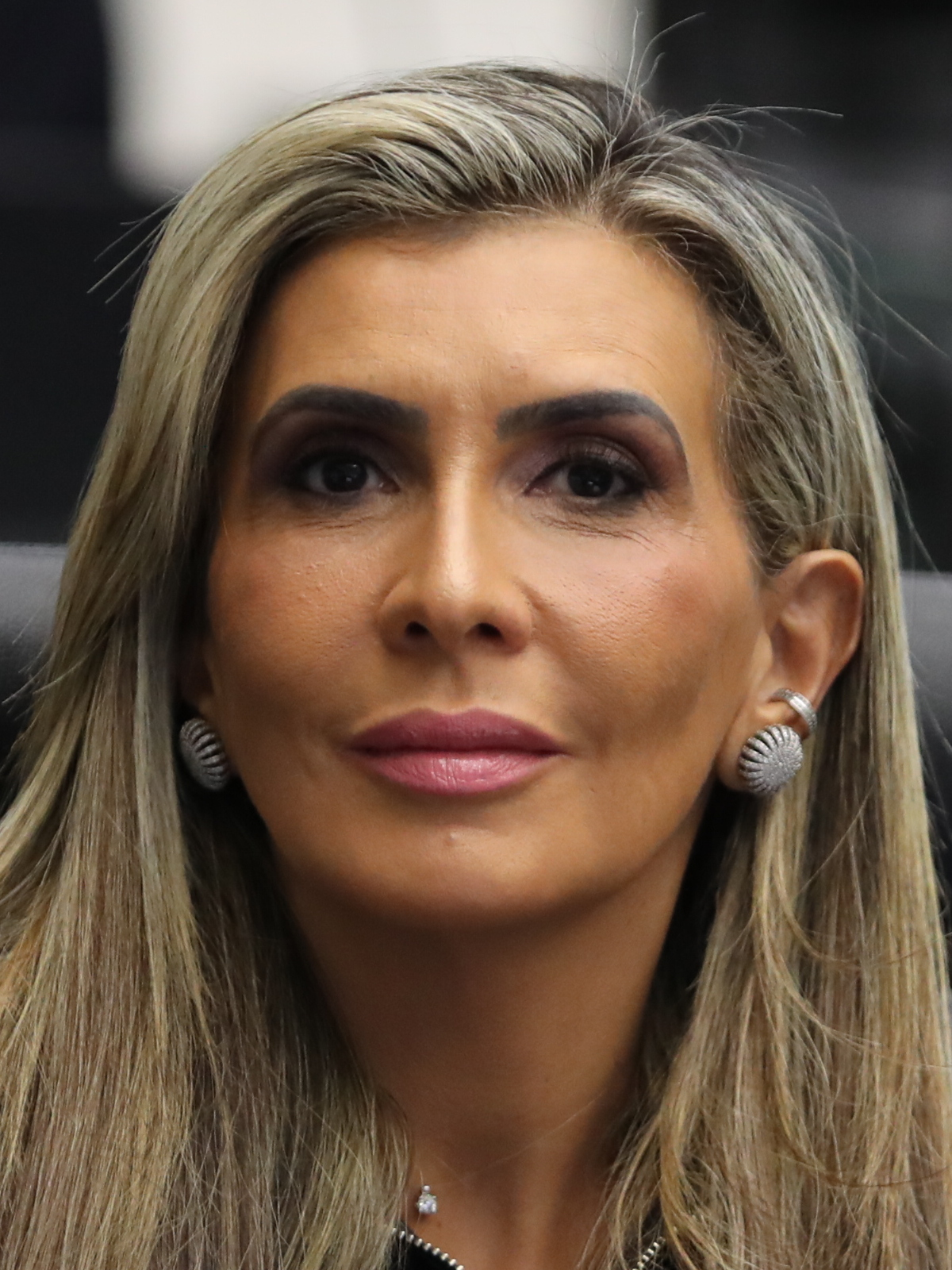
- Francischini in 2023

Member of the Legislative Assembly of Paraná
- Incumbent
- Assumed office 1 February 2023

Personal details
- Born: 23 May 1978 (age 48)
- Party: Solidariedade (since 2026)
- Spouse: Fernando Francischini
- Relatives: Felipe Francischini (stepson)

Flávia Caroline Resende Jaber Francischini (born 23 May 1978) is a Brazilian politician serving as a member of the Legislative Assembly of Paraná since 2023. She is married to Fernando Francischini and the stepmother of Felipe Francischini.
