= Requião Filho =

Brazilian politician (born 1979)

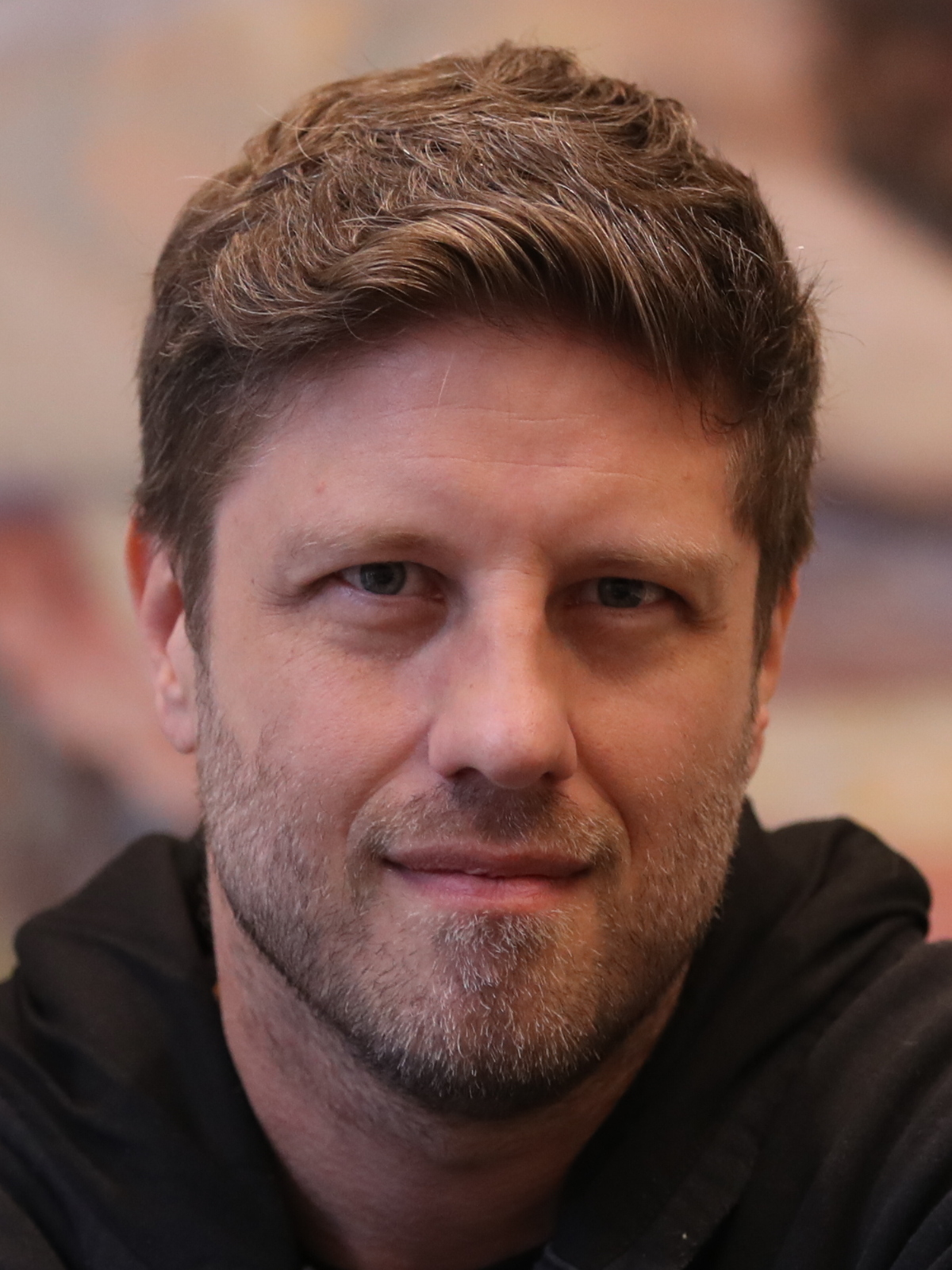
- Filho in 2024

Member of the Legislative Assembly of Paraná
- Incumbent
- Assumed office 1 February 2015

Personal details
- Born: 24 October 1979 (age 47)
- Party: Democratic Labour Party (since 2025)
- Parent: Roberto Requião (father)
- Relatives: Wallace Tadeu de Melo e Silva (grandfather); Maurício Requião (uncle); João Arruda (cousin)

Maurício Thadeu de Mello e Silva (born 24 October 1979), better known as Requião Filho, is a Brazilian politician serving as a member of the Legislative Assembly of Paraná since 2015. He is the son of Roberto Requião, the grandson of Wallace Tadeu de Melo e Silva, the nephew of Maurício Requião, and the cousin of João Arruda.
