= João Arruda =

Brazilian politician (born 1976)

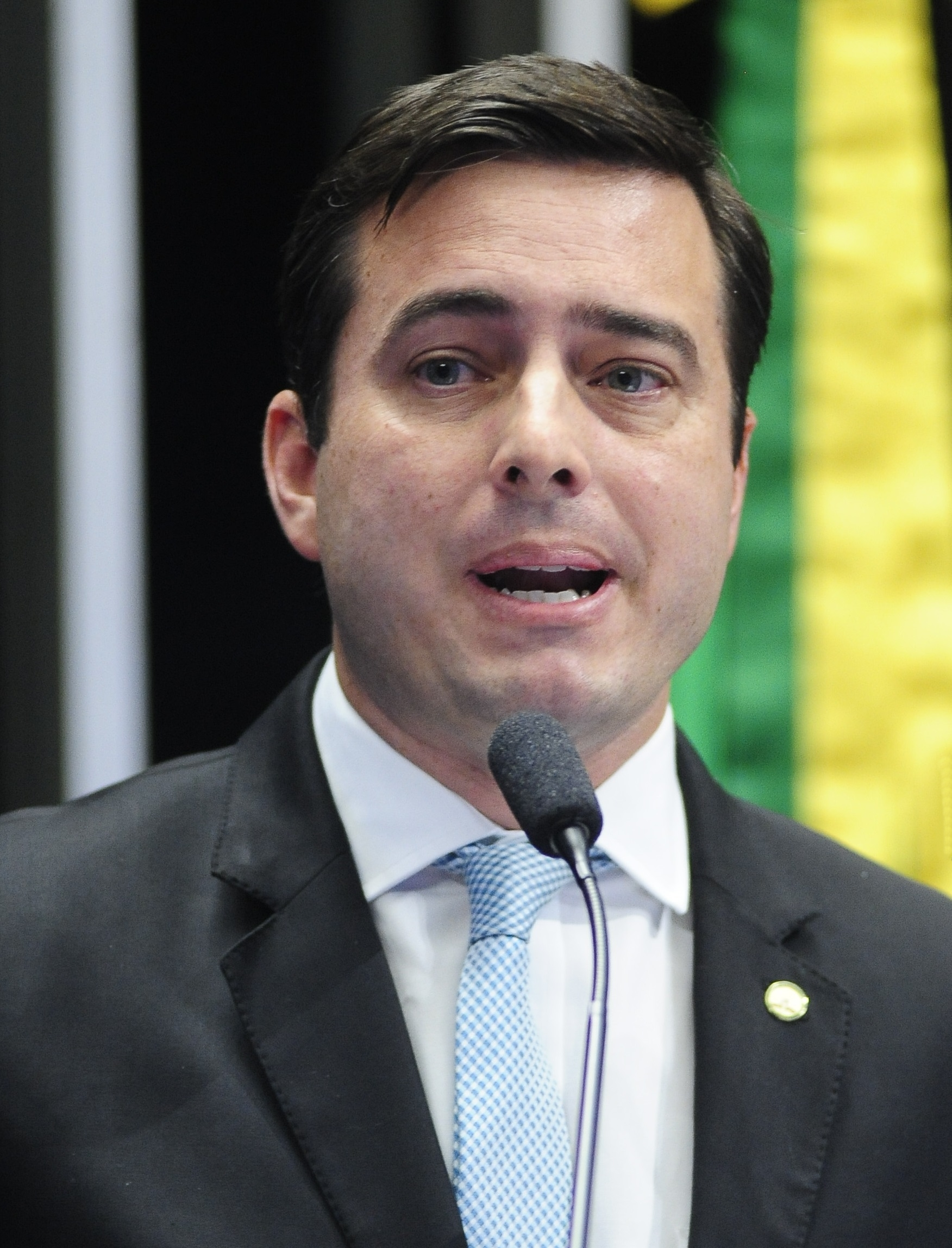
- Arruda in 2015

Member of the Chamber of Deputies
- In office 1 February 2011 – 31 January 2019
- Constituency: Paraná

Personal details
- Born: 22 May 1976 (age 49)
- Party: Brazilian Democratic Movement (since 2005)
- Relatives: Roberto Requião (uncle); Requião Filho (cousin)

João José de Arruda Júnior (born 22 May 1976) is a Brazilian politician. From 2011 to 2019, he was a member of the Chamber of Deputies. He is the nephew of Roberto Requião.
