= Christiane Yared =

Brazilian politician

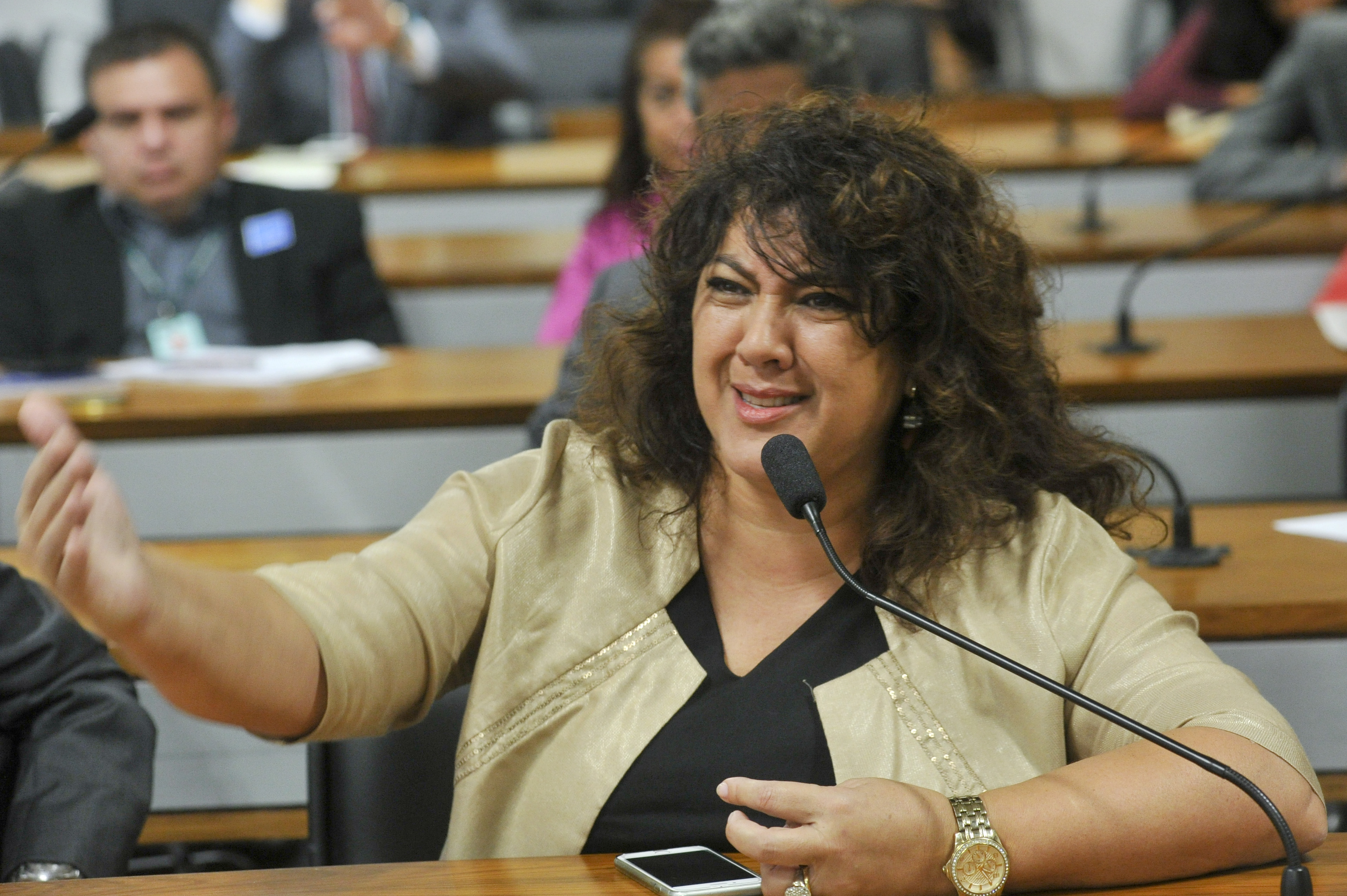
- Yared in 2016

Federal Deputy for Paraná
- Incumbent
- Assumed office 1 February 2015

Personal details
- Born: 23 February 1960 (age 66) Curitiba, Paraná, Brazil
- Party: PL
- Profession: Pastor, professor, businesswoman

Christiane de Souza Yared (born 23 February 1960) is a Brazilian politician. She has spent her political career representing Paraná, having served as state representative since 2015.

== Personal life ==
Yared is the daughter of Althair Costa Souza and Sulamite Souza. She is married to Gilmar Yared (now divorced) and has three children. One of her sons was killed in a car crash in May 2009. As a result of her son's death, Yared has campaigned for traffic safety.

Verde has also worked as a professor, businesswoman, and an evangelical pastor of the Pentecostal church Catedral do Reino de Deus in Curitiba, along with her mother who is also a pastor at the church.

== Political career ==
Yared was elected to the federal senate of deputies in the 2014 election receiving 200,144 votes and being in the top five most voted candidates from the state of Paraná.

Yared voted in favor of the impeachment of then-president Dilma Rousseff. Yared voted against the 2017 Brazilian labor reform, and would vote in favor of a corruption investigation into Rousseff's successor Michel Temer.
