= Loanda, Paraná =

City in Paraná, Brazil

Loanda
- Municipality
- Municipality of Loanda
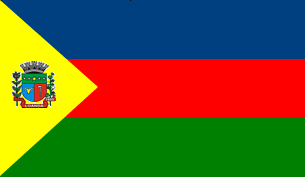
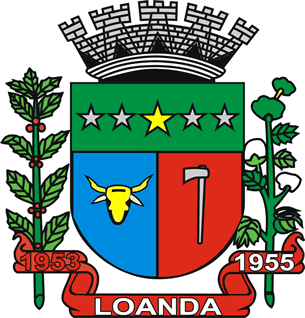
- Flag Coat of arms
- Motto: Avante Loanda este é o novo tempo!
- Interactive map of Loanda
- Location within Brazil
- Coordinates: 22°55′22″S 53°08′13″W
- Country: Brazil
- State: Paraná
- Founded: 27 November 1955
- Elevation: 495 m (1,624 ft)

Population (2020)
  - Total: 23,242
- ISO 3166 code: BR-PR

Loanda is a city in the northwestern region of Paraná, one of Brazil's southern states. As of 2020, the estimated population was 23,242.
