= Felipe Francischini =

Brazilian politician (born 1991)

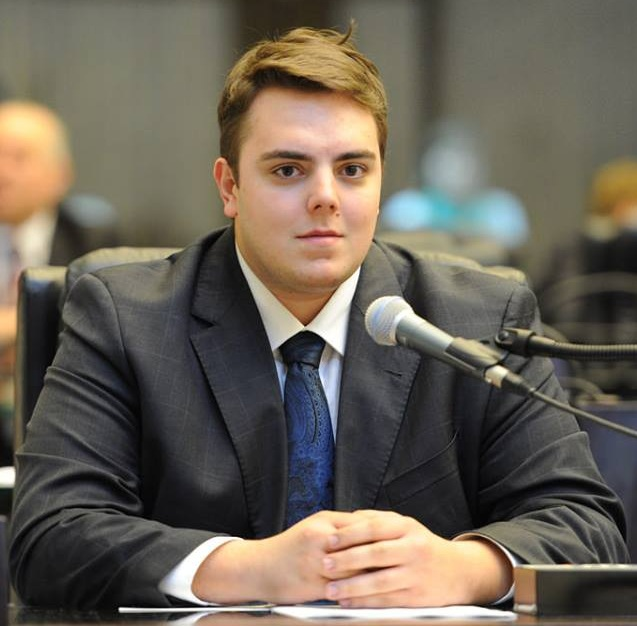
- Francischini in June 2018

Member of the Chamber of Deputies
- Incumbent
- Assumed office 1 February 2019
- Constituency: Paraná

Member of the Legislative Assembly of Paraná
- In office 1 February 2015 – 1 February 2019
- Constituency: At-large

Personal details
- Born: Luis Felipe Bonato Francischini; 2 October 1991 (age 35) Curitiba, Paraná, Brazil
- Party: PODE (2025–present)
- Other political affiliations: PEN (2012–2013); Solidariedade (2013–2018); PSL (2018–2022); UNIÃO (2022–2025)
- Parent: Fernando Francischini (father)
- Profession: Lawyer

Luis Felipe Bonatto Francischini (born 2 October 1991) is a Brazilian politician and lawyer. He has spent his political career representing Paraná, having served as state representative in the lower house of the national legislature since 2019 and the state legislature from 2011 to 2019.

== Personal life ==
Francischini is the son of politician and police chief Fernando Francischini, better known as Delegado Francischini. His father has also served in both the state legislature and the lower house of the national legislature. Francischini is an evangelical Christian and member of the Pentecostal church Assembleias de Deus. Francischini is an alumnus of Centro Universitário Curitiba. According to his father, he showed an interest in politics from an early age and was planning to run for office when he was 16.

== Political career ==
Francischini was elected with about 36,000 votes to the Legislative Assembly of Paraná in 2014, despite the fact that he had no political experience and had just graduated from university. In the 2018 Brazilian general election, Francischini and his father switched roles, with Felipe running for his father's seat in the national legislature and Fernando running for his son's seat in the lower legislature. Reasons for the surprise move were mused by the media, ranging from Fernando Francischini wanting to spend more time with his other son who has autism, or Filipe's political ambitions, or the fact that Fernando wants to eventually run for mayor of Curitiba. In the 2018 election Francischini received 241,537 votes or 4.21% and was elected to the federal chamber of deputies.

Unlike his father who is often brash and unapologetic in public, Francischini is regarded as polite and well-mannered, although he shares his father's uncompromising conservative attitude. He was described by Brazilian newspaper Gazeta do Povo as a "poster boy" for Brazil's right-wing movement.

Chamber of Deputies (Brazil)
Preceded by Daniel Vilela	Chair of the Chamber Constitution, Justice and Citizenship Committee; 2019–21	Succeeded by Bia Kicis
Preceded by Joice Hasselmann	Chamber PSL Leader; 2020–21	Succeeded by Major Vitor Hugo
