= Fernando Francischini =

Brazilian politician (born 1970)

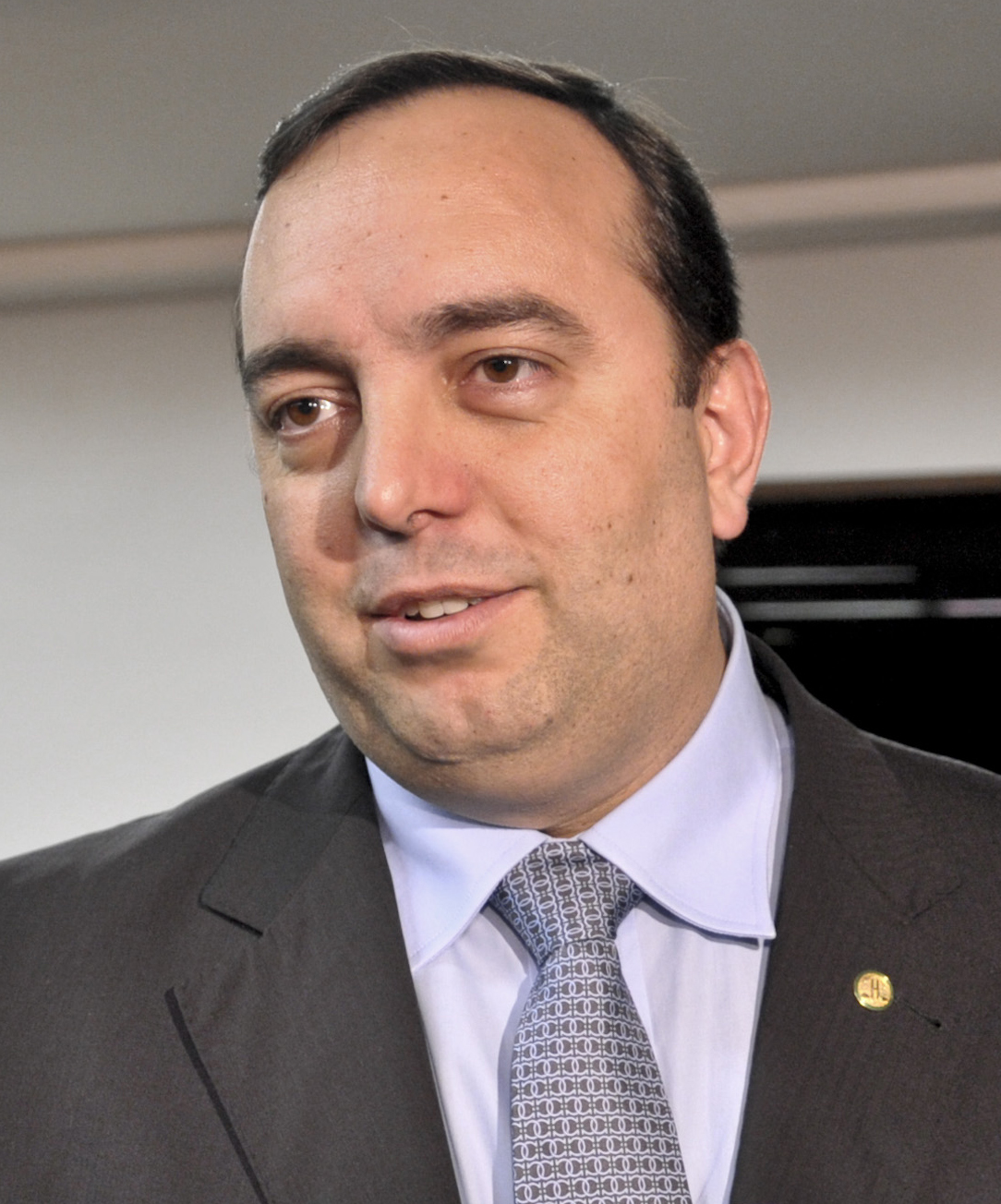
- Francischini in 2011

State Deputy for Paraná
- In office 1 February 2019 – 28 October 2021

Secretary of Public Security for Paraná
- In office 14 December 2014 – 8 May 2015

Federal Deputy for Paraná
- In office 1 February 2011 – 31 January 2019

Personal details
- Born: 26 March 1970 (age 56) Londrina, Brazil
- Party: UNIÃO (2022–present)
- Other political affiliations: PSL (2018–2022); SD (2013–2018); PATRIOTA (2012–2013); PSDB (2009–2012)
- Spouse: Flávia Francischini
- Profession: military police officer

Military service
- Branch/service: Military Police
- Rank: Military Police captain

Fernando Destito Francischini (born 26 March 1970) commonly referred to as Delegado Francischini is a Brazilian politician, as well as a captain in the Brazilian military police. He has spent his political career representing Paraná, having served as state representative in the lower house of the national legislature from 2011 to 2019 and the state legislature since 2019.

== Personal life ==
Francischini is a devout evangelical Christian and member of the Pentecostal church Assembleias de Deus. His son Felipe Francischini is also a politician, having served in both the state legislature and the lower house of the national legislature as his father.

== Political career ==
Francischini voted in favor of the impeachment motion of then-president Dilma Rousseff. He voted in favor raising the spending ceiling of Brazil's government but voted against the 2017 Brazilian labor reforms Francischini voted in favor of a similar corruption investigation into Rousseff's successor Michel Temer.

In November 2016, Francischini opposed "caixa 2" amnesty bill, along with fellow federal deputies Onyx Lorenzoni, Alessandro Molon, Vanderlei Macris, Carlos Sampaio, Joaquim Passarinho, and Senators Alvaro Dias and Ana Amélia Lemos, listening to the claims of the civil society that signed for the approval of the 10 Anti-corruption Measures, and of the Public Prosecutor's Office, author of the bill.

In March 2018 Francischini joined the Social Liberal Party and endorsed Jair Bolsonaro's campaign for president of Brazil.

In October 2021, after an investigation by the police and prosecutors, the Supreme Electoral Tribunal (TSE) ruled that Francischini had violated electoral law by making false claims about the Brazilian electronic voting system in 2018. TSE removed him from his seat in the state legislature and banned him from elected offices for the next eight years. Francischini filed an appeal against the ruling but it was later dismissed by the Brazilian Supreme Court.
