= 57th Legislature of the National Congress =

Incumbent meeting of the legislature of Brazil

57th Legislature of National Congress
←	56th	58th	→
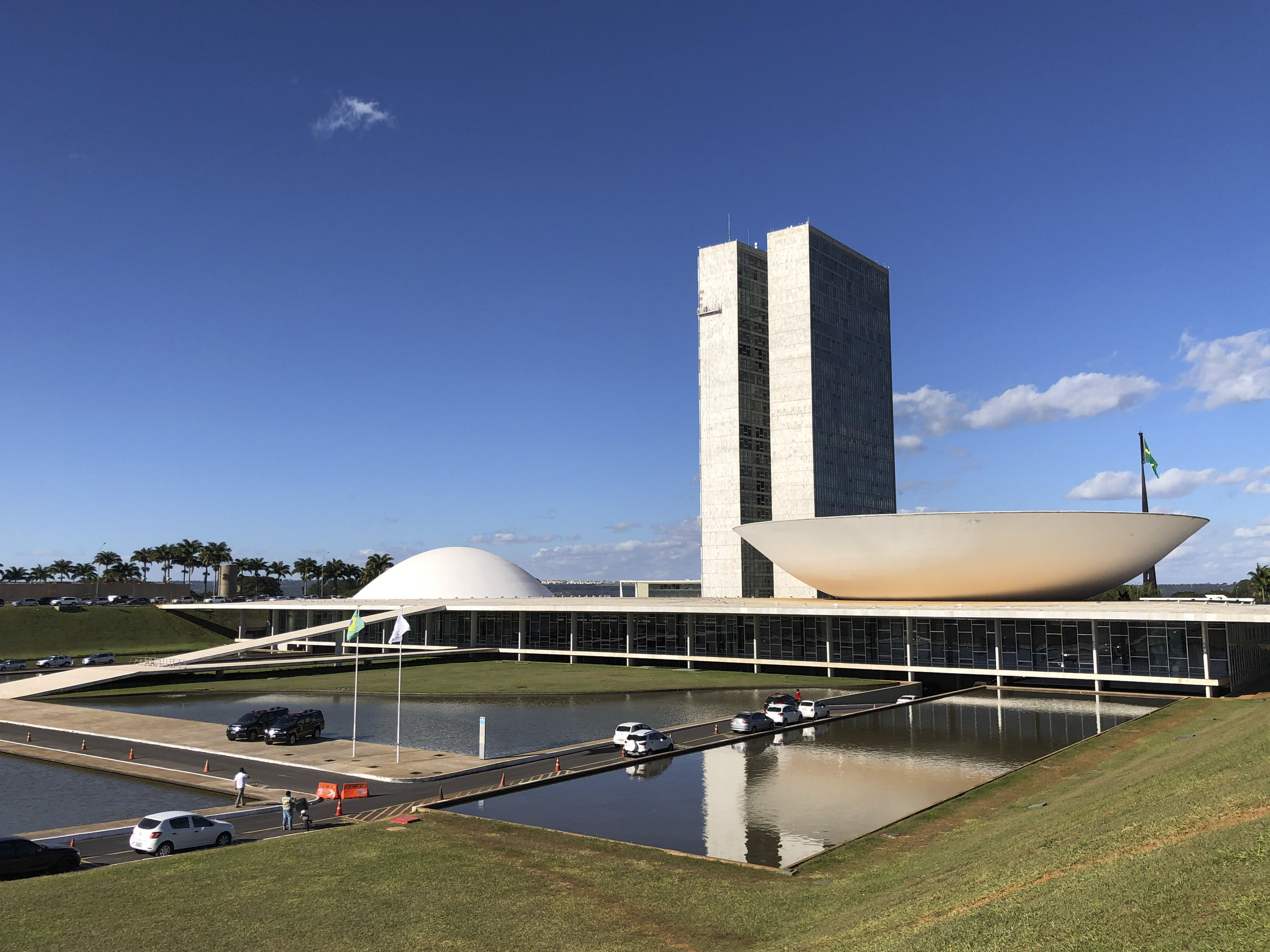
- National Congress building (2019)

Overview
- Legislative body: National Congress
- Meeting place: National Congress Palace
- Term: 1 February 2023 – 31 January 2027
- Election: 2 October 2022
- Government: Second Lula cabinet
- Website: congressonacional.leg.br

Federal Senate
- Members: 81 senators
- President of the Senate: Rodrigo Pacheco (PSD-MG) (until 1 February 2025); Davi Alcolumbre (UNIÃO-AP) (from 1 February 2025)

Chamber of Deputies
- Members: 513 deputies
- President of the Chamber: Arthur Lira (PP-AL) (until 1 February 2025); Hugo Motta (Republicanos-PB) (from 1 February 2025)

Sessions
- 1st: 1 February 2023 – 22 December 2023
- 2nd: 5 February 2024 – 20 December 2024
- 3rd: 3 February 2025 – 19 December 2025
- 4th: 2 February 2026 – present

The 57th Legislature of National Congress is the current meeting of the legislative branch of the Federal Government of Brazil, composed by the Federal Senate and the Chamber of Deputies. It convened in Brasília on 1 February 2023, a month after the inauguration of the winner of the 2022 presidential election.

In the 2022 elections, the Liberal Party became the largest party in the Chamber with 99 deputies and in the Senate with 13 senators. (Note: As in Brazil the government is formed by a coalition, it is hard for a party to reach the majority of 257 deputies and/or 41 senators. Therefore, the majority party is the one with more members in each house.)

== Major events ==
- 1 February 2023: Congress convened. Members-elect of the Federal Senate and the Chamber of Deputies are sworn in. Election for the Directors' Board of the Chamber of Deputies and Senate. Senator Rodrigo Pacheco (PSD-MG) was re-elected Senate President and Congressman Arthur Lira (PP-AL) was re-elected Chamber President.
- 2 February 2023: Joint session of the National Congress to officially inaugurate the 57th Legislature.
- 23 May 2023: The Chamber passes 372-108 the Taxes Framework plan (PLP 93/2023) presented by the Ministry of Finances to partially replace the Constitutional Amendment of the Public Expenditure Cap.
- 30 May 2023: The Chamber passes 311-137 the new Temporal Landmark (PL 490/2007), which forbids new indigenous land registration after 5 October 1988 and new land demarcation must be analyzed by the Congress.
- 21 June 2023: The Senate approves the nomination of Cristiano Zanin for the Supreme Federal Court in a voting of 58–18.
- 6 July 2023: The Chamber passes 382–118, in a first round, and 375–113, in a second round, the Tax Reform plan (PEC 45/2019), which merges most of taxes over consumption into a value added tax.
- 21 June 2023: The Senate passes, with changes, the Taxes Framework plan (PLP 93/2023), in a voting of 57–17. The bill later returned to the Chamber for a last review.
- 22 August 2023: The Chamber passes the last review of the Taxes Framework plan (PLP 93/2023) in a voting of 379–64.
- 27 September 2023: The Senate passes 43–21 the new Temporal Landmark (PL 490/2007).
- 10 October 2023: The Chamber passes 312-0 a motion of disavowal to the October 7 attacks (REQ 3458/2023).
- 18 October 2023: The Chamber passes 323-98 a bill to authorize the membership of Bolivia in Mercosur (PDC 745/2017). The 8 January CPMI approves 20-11 the final report, which requests a formal complaint against more than 60 people, including former president Jair Bolsonaro, his aide-de-camp Mauro Cid, former ministers Walter Braga Netto, Anderson Torres, Augusto Heleno, Luiz Eduardo Ramos, Paulo Sérgio Nogueira, former Navy Commander Almir Garnier Santos and former Army Commander Marco Antônio Freire Gomes.
- 20 October 2023: President Lula da Silva vetoes most of the Temporal Landmark (PL 490/2007), turning the rest of the bill into Law 14701/23.
- 25 October 2023: The Chamber passes 323-119 a bill to tax offshore assets and high income funds (PL 5173/23).
- 8 November 2023: The Senate passes 53–24, with changes, the Tax Reform plan (PEC 45/2019). The bill later returned to the Chamber for a last review.
- 22 November 2023: The Senate passes 52–18, in two rounds, a constitutional amendment to limit the powers of the Supreme Federal Court (PEC 8/2021).
- 27 November 2023: President Lula nominates Justice Minister Flávio Dino for Justice of the Supreme Court and Paulo Gonet for Prosecutor General.
- 13 December 2023: The Senate approves 47-31 the nomination of Flávio Dino for the Supreme Federal Court and 65-11 the nomination of Paulo Gonet for Prosecutor General.
- 5 February 2024: Congress convened for the opening of the 2nd session of the 57th Legislature. A message sent by president Lula was read by Congress First Secretary Luciano Bivar.
- 24 March 2024: Congressman Chiquinho Brazão (UNIÃO-RJ), along with his brother, Domingos Brazão, and former chief of Rio de Janeiro Civil Police, Rivaldo Barbosa, is arrested for ordering the assassination of councillor Marielle Franco.
- 10 April 2024: The Chamber approves 277-129 a resolution to keep congressman Chiquinho Brasão (Ind.-RJ) arrested (CMC 1/2024, converted into Resolution 9/2024).
- 16 April 2024: The Senate passes 53-9 a constitutional amendment to prohibit the possession and carrying of any amount of drugs (PEC 45/2023).
- 6 May 2024: The Chamber passes the declaration of public calamity sent by president Lula da Silva (MSC 175/2024) due to floods in Rio Grande do Sul.
- 7 May 2024: The Chamber passes the declaration of public calamity sent by president Lula da Silva (PDL 236-A/2024).
- 9 May 2024: President Lula da Silva announces a bill to allow R$ 50 billion of extraordinary credit for the reconstruction of cities of Rio Grande do Sul (MPV 1216/2024).
- 8 October 2024: The Senate confirms Gabriel Galípolo for President of the Central Bank of Brazil (MSF 42/2024).
- 30 October 2024: The Chamber rejects 262-136 an amendment to the Taxes Framework plan to tax high net worth.
- 1 February 2025: Congress convened. Election for the Directors' Board of the Chamber of Deputies and Senate. Senator Davi Alcolumbre (UNIÃO-AP) was re-elected for a second non-consecutive term as Senate President and Congressman Hugo Motta (Republicanos-PB) was elected Chamber President.
- 3 February 2025: Congress convened for the opening of the 3rd session of the 57th Legislature. A message sent by president Lula was read by Congress First Secretary Carlos Veras.
- 25 June 2025: Senate passes a bill to increase the number of federal deputies from 513 to 531.
- 5 August 2025: After the end of a mid-year recess, Congress convened. Protesting against the house arrest of former president Bolsonaro, the opposition bloc obstructs congressional works and occupies both Chamber and Senate board of directors.
- 6 August 2025: Chamber President Hugo Motta resumes the presidency of the House.
- 7 August 2025: Senate President Davi Alcolumbre resumes the presidency of the House.
- 8 August 2025: Chamber President Motta files a requirement to the Chamber Internal Affairs Department to suspend or expel 14 deputies who physically obstructed the House works, including Opposition Leader Luciano Zucco, PL Leader Sóstenes Cavalcante and NOVO Leader Marcel van Hattem.
- 16 September 2025: The Chamber passes a constitutional amendment bill to shield deputies and senators from legal investigations and prosecutions and arrests, requiring a secret voting process from the Houses to authorize any of these acts (PEC 3/2021).
- 24 September 2025: The Senate Constitution and Justice Commission unanimously rejects the Constitutional Amendment of Shielding, archiving the bill.
- 12 November 2025: The Senate confirms 42-26 the nomination of Paulo Gonet Branco as Prosecutor General of the Republic for 2 more years.
- 2 February 2026: Congress convened for the opening of the 4th session of the 57th Legislature. A message sent by president Lula was read by Congress First Secretary Carlos Veras.
- 31 March 2026: President Lula nominates Attorney General Jorge Messias for Justice of the Supreme Court.
- 29 April 2026: The Senate rejects Jorge Messias to the Supreme Court, marking the first rejection to the court since 1894.
- 27 May 2026: The Chamber passes 472–22, in a first ballot, and 461-19, in a second ballot, a constitutional amendment to reduce the working hours from 44 to 40 weekly hours and limit the work week in 5 days (PEC 221/19).

== Party summary ==
=== Chamber of Deputies ===
Party or alliance		Votes	%	Seats	+/–
Liberal Party		18,201,246	16.62	99	+66 (Note: Compared to the deputies of the Party of the Republic elected in 2018. The party was renamed Liberal Party in 2019.)
Brazil of Hope	Workers' Party	13,170,626	12.02	67	+11
Brazil of Hope	Communist Party of Brazil	1,154,712	1.05	6	–4 (Note: Compared to the combined deputies of the Communist Party of Brazil and of the Free Fatherland Party elected in 2018. The parties merged after that election.)
Brazil of Hope	Green Party	954,578	0.87	6	+2
Brazil Union		10,198,288	9.31	59	–22 (Note: Compared to the combined deputies of the Social Liberal Party and of Democrats elected in 2018. The parties merged to form Brazil Union in 2022.)
Progressistas		8,692,918	7.94	47	+10
Social Democratic Party		8,293,956	7.57	42	+8
Brazilian Democratic Movement		7,870,810	7.18	42	+8
Republicans		7,610,894	6.95	41	+11 (Note: Compared to the deputies of the Brazilian Republican Party elected in 2018. The party was renamed Republicans in 2019.)
Always; Forward	Brazilian Social Democracy Party	3,309,061	3.02	13	–16
Always; Forward	Cidadania	1,614,106	1.47	5	–3 (Note: Compared to the deputies of the Popular Socialist Party elected in 2018. The party was renamed Cidadania in 2019.)
PSOL; REDE	Socialism and Liberty Party	3,856,031	3.52	12	+2
PSOL; REDE	Sustainability Network	783,601	0.72	2	+1
Brazilian Socialist Party		4,172,383	3.81	14	–18
Democratic Labour Party		3,828,289	3.49	17	–11
Podemos		3,610,634	3.30	12	–5 (Note: Compared to the combined deputies of Podemos and of the Humanist Party of Solidarity elected in 2018. The parties merged after that election.)
Avante		2,175,355	1.99	7	0
Social Christian Party		1,944,678	1.78	6	–2
Solidarity		1,697,127	1.55	4	–9
Patriota		1,526,570	1.39	4	–5 (Note: Compared to the combined deputies of Patriota and of the Progressive Republican Party elected in 2018. The parties merged after that election.)
Brazilian Labour Party		1,422,652	1.30	1	–9
New Party		1,354,754	1.24	3	–5
Republican Party of the Social Order		1,042,698	0.95	4	–4
Brazilian Labour Renewal Party		288,027	0.26	0	0
Party of National Mobilization		256,578	0.23	0	–3
Act		158,622	0.14	0	–2 (Note: Compared to the deputies of the Christian Labour Party elected in 2018. The party was renamed Act in 2022.)
Christian Democracy		97,741	0.09	0	–1
Brazilian Communist Party		85,511	0.08	0	0
Brazilian Woman's Party		83,055	0.08	0	0
Popular Unity		54,586	0.05	0	New
United Socialist Workers' Party		27,995	0.03	0	0
Workers' Cause Party		7,308	0.01	0	0
Total		109,545,390	100.00	513	0
Valid votes		109,545,390	88.92		
Invalid votes		6,149,056	4.99		
Blank votes		7,501,125	6.09		
Total votes		123,195,571	100.00		
Registered voters/turnout		155,557,503	79.20		
Source: Superior Electoral Court

=== Federal Senate ===
Party or alliance		Votes	%	Seats		
Party or alliance		Votes	%	Elected	Total	+/–
Liberal Party		25,278,764	25.39	8	13	+11 (Note: Compared to the senators of the Party of the Republic elected in 2018 or not up for election in 2018. The party was renamed Liberal Party in 2019.)
Brazilian Socialist Party		13,615,846	13.67	1	1	–1
Brazil of Hope	Workers' Party	12,024,696	12.08	4	9	+3
Brazil of Hope	Green Party	475,597	0.48	0	0	0
Brazil of Hope	Communist Party of Brazil	299,013	0.30	0	0	0
Social Democratic Party		11,312,512	11.36	2	10	+3
Progressistas		7,592,391	7.62	3	7	+2
Brazil Union		5,465,486	5.49	5	12	+2 (Note: Compared to the combined senators of Democrats and of the Social Liberal Party elected in 2018 or not up for election in 2018. The parties merged to form Brazil Union in 2022.)
Social Christian Party		4,285,485	4.30	1	1	0
Republicans		4,259,279	4.28	2	3	+2 (Note: Compared to the senators of the Brazilian Republican Party elected in 2018 or not up for election in 2018. The party was renamed Republicans in 2019.)
Brazilian Democratic Movement		3,882,458	3.90	1	10	–2
Brazilian Labour Party		2,046,003	2.05	0	0	–3
Podemos		1,776,283	1.78	0	6	–1 (Note: Compared to the combined senators of Podemos and of the Humanist Party of Solidarity elected in 2018 or not up for election in 2018. The parties merged after that election.)
Democratic Labour Party		1,586,922	1.59	0	2	–2
Always; Forward	Brazilian Social Democracy Party	1,384,871	1.39	0	4	–5
Always; Forward	Cidadania	0	0.00	0	1	–1 (Note: Compared to the senators of the Popular Socialist Party elected in 2018 or not up for election in 2018. The party was renamed Cidadania in 2019.)
Avante		1,359,455	1.37	0	0	0
Brazilian Labour Renewal Party		758,938	0.76	0	0	0
PSOL; REDE	Socialism and Liberty Party	675,244	0.68	0	0	0
PSOL; REDE	Sustainability Network	8,133	0.01	0	1	–4
New Party		479,593	0.48	0	0	0
Popular Unity		291,294	0.29	0	0	New
Republican Party of the Social Order		213,247	0.21	0	1	0
United Socialist Workers' Party		132,680	0.13	0	0	0
Christian Democracy		94,098	0.09	0	0	0
Patriota		76,729	0.08	0	0	–1 (Note: Compared to the combined senators of Patriota and of the Progressive Republican Party elected in 2018 or not up for election in 2018. The parties merged after that election.)
Brazilian Communist Party		64,569	0.06	0	0	0
Brazilian Woman's Party		61,350	0.06	0	0	0
Party of National Mobilization		27,812	0.03	0	0	0
Act		24,076	0.02	0	0	–1 (Note: Compared to the senators of the Christian Labour Party elected in 2018 or not up for election in 2018. The party was renamed Act in 2022.)
Solidarity		17,339	0.02	0	0	–1
Workers' Cause Party		5,572	0.01	0	0	0
Independent		0	0.00	0	0	–1
Total		99,575,735	100.00	27	81	0
Valid votes		99,575,735	80.83			
Invalid votes		14,279,527	11.59			
Blank votes		9,340,309	7.58			
Total votes		123,195,571	100.00			
Registered voters/turnout		155,557,503	79.20			
Source: Superior Electoral Court

== Leadership ==
=== Federal Senate ===
Senate Presidents

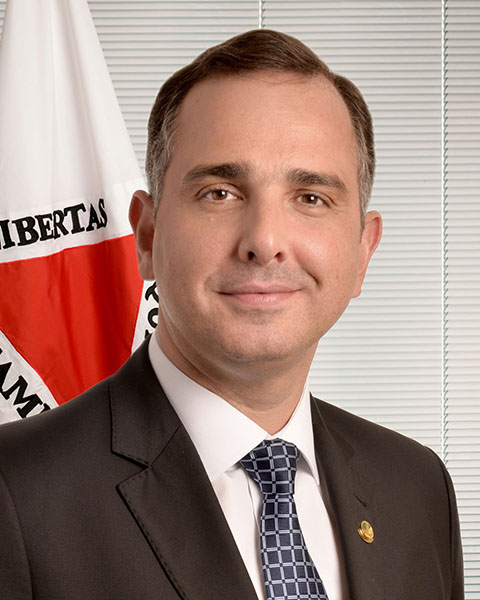
Rodrigo Pacheco (PSD-MG),
until 1 February 2025

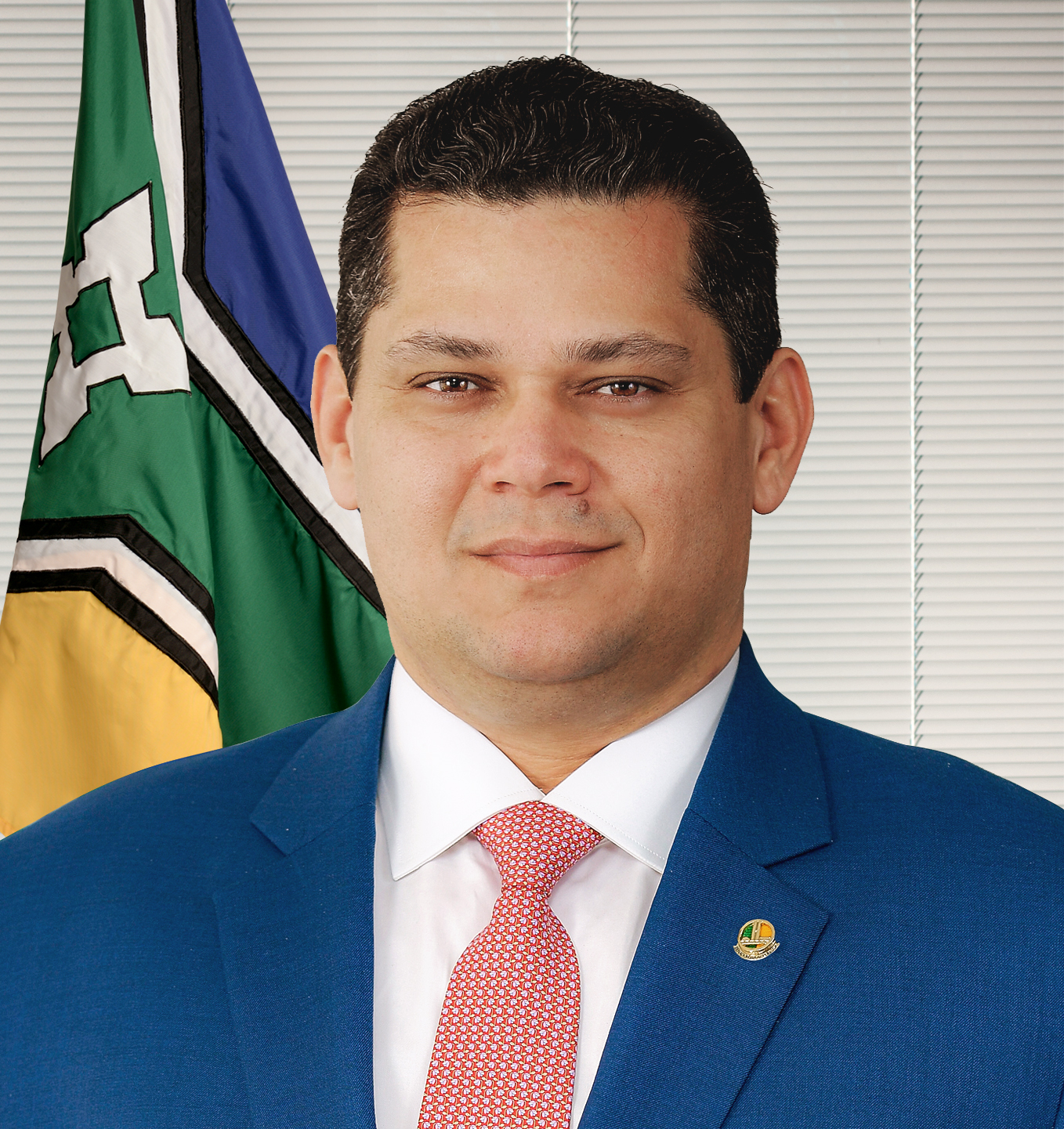
Davi Alcolumbre (UNIÃO-AP),
from 1 February 2025

- President of the Federal Senate:
  - Rodrigo Pacheco (PSD–MG) – until 1 February 2025
  - Davi Alcolumbre (UNIÃO–AP) – from 1 February 2025

1 February 2023 president election
Candidate	Party	Votes	%
Rodrigo Pacheco (MG) ✓	PSD	49	60.49
Rogério Marinho (RN)	PL	32	39.51
Total		81	100.00
Valid votes		81	100.00
Invalid/blank votes		0	0.00
Total votes		81	100.00
Registered voters/turnout		81	100.00

1 February 2025 president election
Candidate	Party	Votes	%
Davi Alcolumbre (AP) ✓	UNIÃO	73	90.12
Eduardo Girão (CE)	NOVO	4	4.94
Marcos Pontes (SP)	PL	4	4.94
Total		81	100.00
Valid votes		81	100.00
Invalid/blank votes		0	0.00
Total votes		81	100.00
Registered voters/turnout		81	100.00

- Government Leader: Jaques Wagner (PT-BA)
- Majority Leader: Renan Calheiros (MDB-AL)
- Opposition Leader: Rogério Marinho (PL-RN)
- Minority Leader: Ciro Nogueira (PP-PI)
- Female Caucus Leader: Leila Barros (PDT-DF)
- PSD Leader: Omar Aziz (AM)
- PL Leader: Carlos Portinho (RJ)
- MDB Leader: Eduardo Braga (AM)
- UNIÃO Leader: Efraim Filho (PB)
- PT Leader: Rogério Carvalho (SE)
- PP Leader: Tereza Cristina (MS)
- PSB Leader: Jorge Kajuru (GO)
- PODE Leader: Carlos Viana (MG)
- Republicanos Leader: Mecias de Jesus (RR)
- PSDB Leader: Plínio Valério (AM)
- PDT Leader: Weverton Rocha (MA)

=== Chamber of Deputies ===
Chamber Presidents

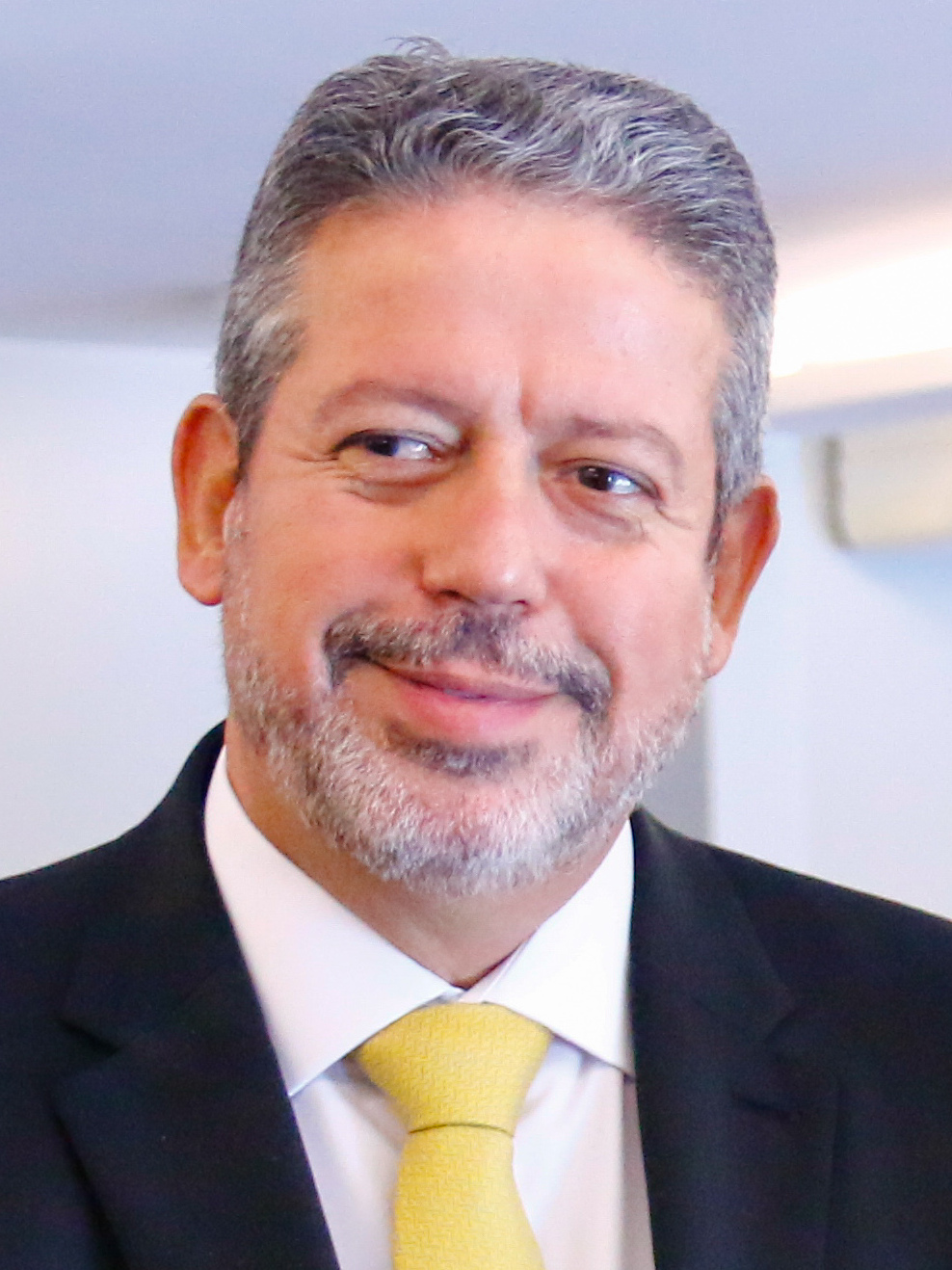
Arthur Lira (PP-AL),
until 1 February 2025

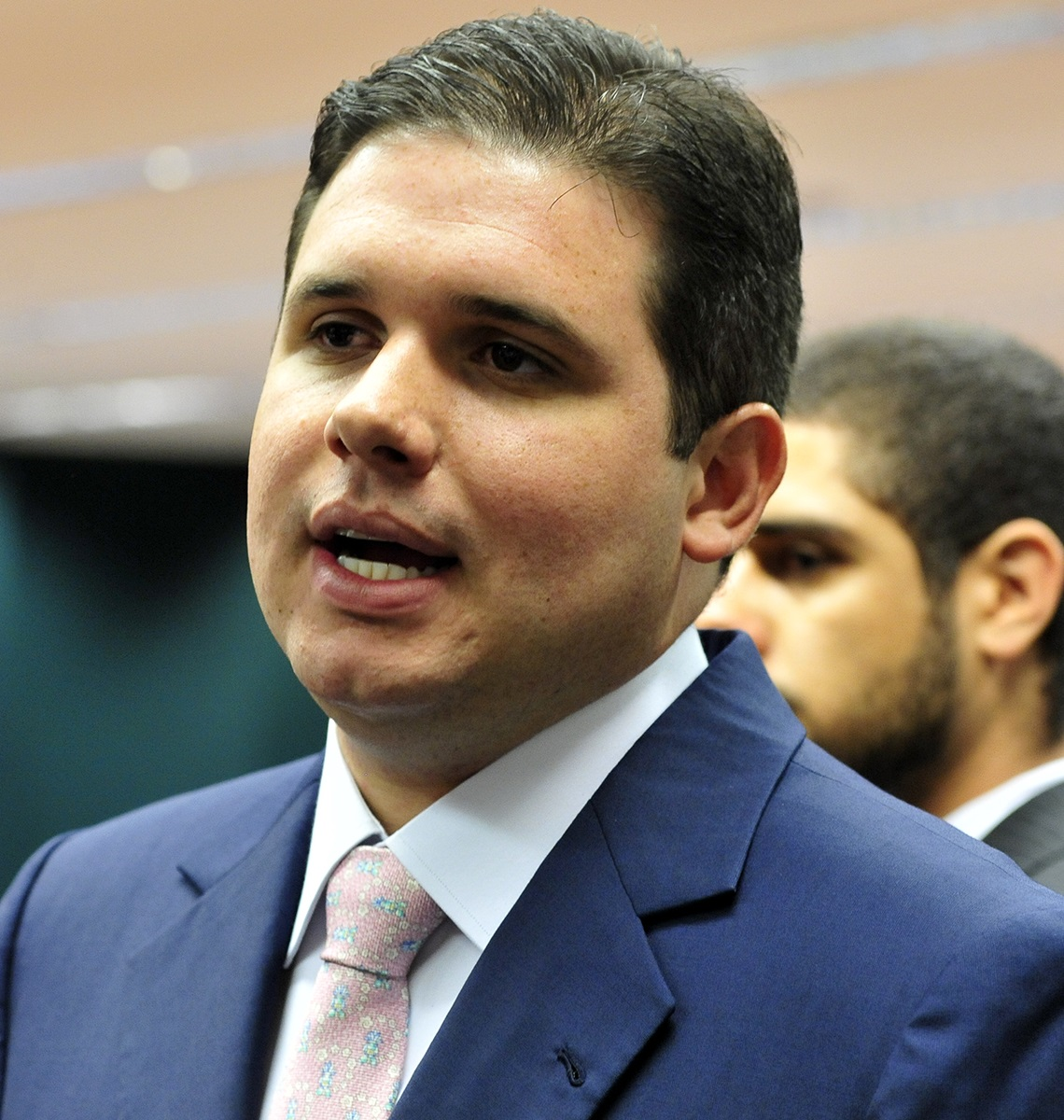
Hugo Motta (Republicanos-PB),
from 1 February 2025

- President of the Chamber of Deputies:
  - Arthur Lira (PP-AL) – until 1 February 2025
  - Hugo Motta (Republicanos-PB) – from 1 February 2025

1 February 2023 president election
Candidate	Party	Votes	%
Arthur Lira (AL) ✓	PP	464	92.06
Chico Alencar (RJ)	PSOL	21	4.17
Marcel van Hattem (RS)	NOVO	19	3.77
Total		504	100.00
Valid votes		504	99.02
Invalid/blank votes		5	0.98
Total votes		509	100.00
Registered voters/turnout		513	99.22

1 February 2025 president election
Candidate	Party	Votes	%
Hugo Motta (PB) ✓	Republicanos	444	89.34
Marcel van Hattem (RS)	NOVO	31	6.24
Henrique Vieira (RJ)	PSOL	22	4.43
Total		497	100.00
Valid votes		497	99.60
Invalid/blank votes		2	0.40
Total votes		499	100.00
Registered voters/turnout		513	97.27

- Government Leader: José Guimarães (PT-CE)
- Majority Leader: André Figueiredo (PDT-CE)
- Opposition Leader: Luciano Zucco (PL-RS)
- Minority Leader: Caroline de Toni (PL-SC)
- PL Leader: Sóstenes Cavalcante (RJ)
- Brazil of Hope Leader: Lindbergh Farias (RJ)
- UNIÃO Leader: Pedro Lucas Fernandes (MA)
- PP Leader: Dr. Luizinho (RJ)
- MDB Leader: Isnaldo Bulhões (AL)
- PSD Leader: Antonio Brito (BA)
- Republicanos Leader: Gilberto Abramo (MG)
- Always Forward Leader: Adolfo Viana (BA)
- PDT Leader: Afonso Motta (RS)
- PSB Leader: Pedro Campos (PE)
- PSOL REDE Leader: Talíria Petrone (RJ)
- PODE Leader: Rodrigo Gambale (SP)
- Avante Leader: Luis Tibé (MG)
- PRD Leader: Fred Costa (MG)
- Solidariedade Leader: Aureo Ribeiro (RJ)
- NOVO Leader: Adriana Ventura (SP)

== Members ==
=== Federal Senate ===
==== Acre ====
▌ Alan Rick (UNIÃO)
▌ Márcio Bittar (PL)
▌ Sérgio Petecão (PSD)

==== Alagoas ====
▌ Fernando Farias (MDB)
▌ Renan Calheiros (MDB)
▌ Rodrigo Cunha (PODE), until 29 December 2024 (Note: Resigned to assume office as Vice Mayor of Maceió.)

▌ Eudócia Caldas (PL), from 29 December 2024

==== Amapá ====
▌ Davi Alcolumbre (UNIÃO)
▌ Lucas Barreto (PSD)
▌ Randolfe Rodrigues (PT)

==== Amazonas ====
▌ Eduardo Braga (MDB)
▌ Omar Aziz (PSD)
▌ Plínio Valério (PSDB)

==== Bahia ====
▌ Angelo Coronel (Republicanos)
▌ Jaques Wagner (PT)
▌ Otto Alencar (PSD)

==== Ceará ====
▌ Augusta Brito (PT)
▌ Cid Gomes (PSB)
▌ Eduardo Girão (NOVO)

==== Espírito Santo ====
▌ Fabiano Contarato (PT)
▌ Magno Malta (PL)
▌ Marcos do Val (PODE)

==== Federal District ====
▌ Damares Alves (Republicanos)
▌ Izalci Lucas (PL)
▌ Leila Barros (PDT)

==== Goiás ====
▌ Jorge Kajuru (PSB)
▌ Vanderlan Cardoso (PSD)
▌ Wilder Morais (PL)

==== Maranhão ====
▌ Eliziane Gama (PT)
▌ Flávio Dino (PSB), until 20 February 2024 (Note: Resigned to assume office as justice of the Supreme Federal Court.)

▌ Ana Paula Lobato (PSB), from 21 February 2024

▌ Weverton Rocha (PDT)

==== Mato Grosso ====
▌ Jayme Campos (UNIÃO)
▌ Margareth Buzetti (PP)
▌ Wellington Fagundes (PL)

==== Mato Grosso do Sul ====
▌ Nelson Trad (PSD)
▌ Soraya Thronicke (PODE)
▌ Tereza Cristina (PP)

==== Minas Gerais ====
▌ Carlos Viana (PODE)
▌ Cleitinho Azevedo (Republicanos)
▌ Rodrigo Pacheco (PSD), until 30 September 2026 (Note: Resigned to assume office of justice of the Federal Court of Accounts.)

▌ Renzo Braz (PP), from 30 September 2026

==== Pará ====
▌ Beto Faro (PT)
▌ Jader Barbalho (MDB)
▌ Zequinha Marinho (PODE)

==== Paraíba ====
▌ Daniella Ribeiro (PSD)
▌ Efraim Filho (UNIÃO)
▌ Veneziano Vital do Rêgo (MDB)

==== Paraná ====
▌ Flávio Arns (PSB)
▌ Oriovisto Guimarães (PODE)
▌ Sergio Moro (PL)

==== Pernambuco ====
▌ Humberto Costa (PT)
▌ Jarbas Vasconcelos (MDB), until 5 September 2023

▌ Fernando Dueire (MDB), from 5 September 2023

▌ Teresa Leitão (PT)

==== Piauí ====
▌ Ciro Nogueira (PP)
▌ Jussara Lima (PSD)
▌ Marcelo Castro (MDB)

==== Rio de Janeiro ====
▌ Carlos Portinho (PL)
▌ Flávio Bolsonaro (PL)
▌ Romário Faria (PL)

==== Rio Grande do Norte ====
▌ Rogério Marinho (PL)
▌ Styvenson Valentim (PODE)
▌ Zenaide Maia (PSD)

==== Rio Grande do Sul ====
▌ Hamilton Mourão (Republicanos)
▌ Luis Carlos Heinze (PP)
▌ Paulo Paim (PT)

==== Rondônia ====
▌ Confúcio Moura (MDB)
▌ Jaime Bagattoli (PL)
▌ Marcos Rogério (PL)

==== Roraima ====
▌ Chico Rodrigues (PSB)
▌ Hiran Gonçalves (PP)
▌ Mecias de Jesus (Republicanos), until 11 March 2026 (Note: Resigned to assume office of councillor of the State Court of Accounts of Roraima.)

▌ Roberta Acioly (Republicanos), from 11 March 2026

==== Santa Catarina ====
▌ Esperidião Amin (PP)
▌ Ivete da Silveira (MDB)
▌ Jorge Seif (PL)

==== São Paulo ====
▌ Alexandre Giordano (PODE)
▌ Mara Gabrilli (PSD)
▌ Marcos Pontes (PL)

==== Sergipe ====
▌ Alessandro Vieira (MDB)
▌ Laercio Oliveira (PP)
▌ Rogério Carvalho (PT)

==== Tocantins ====
▌ Dorinha Rezende (UNIÃO)
▌ Eduardo Gomes (PL)
▌ Irajá Abreu (PSD)

=== Chamber of Deputies ===
==== Acre ====
▌ Antônia Lúcia (Republicanos)
▌ Eduardo Velloso (UNIÃO)
▌ Gerlen Diniz (PP), until 1 January 2025 (Note: Resigned to assume office as Mayor of Sena Madureira.)

▌ José Adriano (PP), 1 January 2025

▌ Meire Serafim (UNIÃO)
▌ Socorro Neri (PP)
▌ Roberto Duarte (Republicanos)
▌ Coronel Ulysses (UNIÃO)
▌ Zezinho Barbary (PP)

==== Alagoas ====
▌ Alfredo Gaspar (UNIÃO)
▌ Arthur Lira (PP)
▌ Daniel Barbosa (PP)
▌ Fabio Costa (PP)
▌ Isnaldo Bulhões (MDB)
▌ Luciano Amaral (PV)
▌ Marx Beltrão (PP)
▌ Paulo dos Santos (PT)
▌ Rafael Brito (MDB)

==== Amapá ====
▌ Acácio Favacho (MDB)
▌ Augusto Puppio (MDB), until 31 July 2025 (Note: Mandate revoked by decision of the Supreme Federal Court about "electoral leftovers".)

▌ André Abdon (PP), from 1 August 2025

▌ Dorinaldo Malafaia (PDT)
▌ Goreth de Sousa (PDT), until 31 July 2025

▌ Professora Marcivânia (PCdoB), from 1 August 2025

▌ Josenildo Abrantes (PDT)
▌ Silvia Waiãpi (PL), until 31 July 2025

▌ Paulo Lemos (PSOL), until 12 November 2025

▌ Lucas Abrahão (REDE), from 12 November 2025

▌ Sonize Barbosa (PL), until 31 July 2025

▌ Aline Gurgel (Republicanos), from 1 August 2025

▌ Vinicius Gurgel (PL)

==== Amazonas ====
▌ Adail Filho (Republicanos)
▌ Capitão Alberto Neto (PL)
▌ Amom Mandel (Cidadania)
▌ Atila Lins (PSD)
▌ Fausto Junior (UNIÃO)
▌ Saullo Vianna (UNIÃO)
▌ Sidney Leite (PSD)
▌ Silas Câmara (Republicanos)

==== Bahia ====
▌ Dal Barreto (UNIÃO)
▌ Adolfo Viana (PSDB)
▌ Afonso Florence (PT), until 7 February 2023

▌ Josias Gomes (PT), from 7 February 2023

▌ Capitão Alden (PL)
▌ Alex Santana (Republicanos)
▌ Alice Portugal (PCdoB)
▌ Antonio Brito (PSD)
▌ Arthur Maia (UNIÃO)
▌ Bacelar Batista (PV)
▌ Claudio Cajado (PP)
▌ Daniel Almeida (PCdoB)
▌ Diego Coronel (PSD)
▌ Elmar Nascimento (UNIÃO)
▌ Félix Mendonça Júnior (PDT)
▌ Gabriel Nunes (PSD)
▌ Isidório de Santana Jr (Avante)
▌ Ivoneide Caetano (PT)
▌ João Carlos Bacelar (PL)
▌ João Leão (PP)
▌ Jorge Solla (PT)
▌ José Neto (PT)
▌ José Rocha (UNIÃO)
▌ Joseildo Ramos (PT)
▌ Leo Prates (PDT)
▌ Leur Lomanto Júnior (UNIÃO)
▌ Lídice da Mata (PSB)
▌ Marcio Marinho (Republicanos)
▌ Mário Negromonte Jr. (PP)
▌ Neto Carletto (PP)
▌ Otto Alencar Filho (PSD)
▌ Paulo Azi (UNIÃO)
▌ Paulo Magalhães (PSD)
▌ Raimundo Costa (PODE)
▌ Ricardo Maia (MDB)
▌ Roberta Roma (PL)
▌ Rogéria Santos (Republicanos)
▌ Sérgio Brito (PSD), until 8 February 2023

▌ Charles Fernandes (PSD), from 8 February 2023

▌ Valmir Assunção (PT)
▌ Waldenor Pereira (PT)

==== Ceará ====
▌ André Fernandes (PL)
▌ André Figueiredo (PDT)
▌ AJ Albuquerque (PP)
▌ Célio Studart (PSD)
▌ Danilo Forte (UNIÃO)
▌ Dayany Bittencourt (UNIÃO)
▌ Domingos Neto (PSD)
▌ Eduardo Bismarck (PDT)
▌ Eunicio Oliveira (MDB)
▌ Fernanda Pessoa (UNIÃO)
▌ Idilvan Alencar (PDT)
▌ Jaziel Pereira (PL)
▌ José Airton (PT)
▌ José Guimarães (PT)
▌ Júnior Mano (PL)
▌ Luiz Gastão (PSD)
▌ Luizianne Lins (PT)
▌ Matheus Noronha (PL)
▌ Mauro Benevides Filho (PDT)
▌ Moses Rodrigues (UNIÃO)
▌ Robério Monteiro (PDT)
▌ Yury do Paredão (MDB)

==== Espírito Santo ====
▌ Amaro Neto (Republicanos)
▌ Evair de Melo (PP)
▌ Gilson Daniel (PODE)
▌ Gilvan Aguiar (PL)
▌ Helder Salomão (PT)
▌ Jack Rocha (PT)
▌ Da Vitória (PP)
▌ Messias Donato (Republicanos)
▌ Paulo Foletto (PSB)
▌ Victor Linhalis (PODE)

==== Federal District ====
▌ Alberto Fraga (PL)
▌ Bia Kicis (PL)
▌ Erika Kokay (PT)
▌ Fred Linhares (Republicanos)
▌ Gilvan Maximo (Republicanos), until 31 July 2025

▌ Rodrigo Rollemberg (PSB), from 31 July 2025

▌ Julio Cesar Ribeiro (Republicanos), until 7 March 2023

▌ Paulo Fernando (Republicanos), from 7 March 2023

▌ Rafael Prudente (MDB)
▌ Reginaldo Veras (PV)

==== Goiás ====
▌ Adriana Accorsi (PT)
▌ Adriano do Baldy (PP)
▌ Alcides Ribeiro (PL)
▌ Célio Silveira (MDB), until 3 August 2023

▌ Márcio Corrêa (MDB), from 8 August 2023

▌ Daniel Agrobom (PL)
▌ Flávia Morais (PDT)
▌ Glaustin da Fokus (PSC)
▌ Gustavo Gayer (PL)
▌ Ismael Alexandrino (PSD)
▌ Jeferson Rodrigues (Republicanos)
▌ José Nelto (PP)
▌ Lêda Borges (PSDB)
▌ Magda Mofatto (PRD)
▌ Marussa Boldrin (MDB)
▌ Rubens Otoni (PT)
▌ Silvye Alves (UNIÃO)
▌ Zacharias Calil (UNIÃO)

==== Maranhão ====
▌ Aluísio Mendes (PSC)
▌ Amanda Gentil (PP)
▌ André Fufuca (PP), until 13 September 2023

▌ Allan Garcês (PP), from 13 September 2023

▌ Dr. Benjamim (UNIÃO), until 1 January 2025

▌ Ivan Júnior (UNIÃO), from 1 January 2025

▌ Cleber Verde (Republicanos)
▌ Fábio Macedo (PODE)
▌ Pastor Gil (PL)
▌ Hildelis Duarte Jr (PSB)
▌ Josimar Maranhãozinho (PL)
▌ Josivaldo JP (PSD)
▌ Juscelino Filho (UNIÃO)
▌ Junior Lourenço (PL)
▌ Detinha (PL)
▌ Marcio Jerry (PCdoB)
▌ Márcio Honaiser (PDT)
▌ Marreca Filho (PRD)
▌ Pedro Lucas Fernandes (UNIÃO)
▌ Roseana Sarney (MDB)
▌ Rubens Pereira Júnior (PT)

==== Mato Grosso ====
▌ Abilio Brunini (PL), until 1 January 2025 (Note: Resigned to assume office as Mayor of Cuiabá.)

▌ Rodrigo da Zaeli (PL), from 1 January 2025

▌ Amália Barros (PL), until 12 May 2024 (Note: Died on 12 May 2024 due to toxoplasmosis.)

▌ Nelson Ned (PL), from 21 May 2024

▌ Emanuel Pinheiro Neto (MDB)
▌ Fábio Garcia (UNIÃO), until 7 July 2023

▌ Gisela Simona (UNIÃO), from 7 July 2023

▌ Coronel Assis (UNIÃO)
▌ José Medeiros (PL)
▌ Juarez Costa (MDB)
▌ Coronel Fernanda (PL)

==== Mato Grosso do Sul ====
▌ Beto Pereira (PSDB)
▌ Camila Jara (PT)
▌ Dagoberto Nogueira (PSDB)
▌ Geraldo Resende (PSDB)
▌ Luiz Ovando (PP)
▌ Marcos Pollon (PL)
▌ Rodolfo Nogueira (PL)
▌ Vander Loubet (PT)

==== Minas Gerais ====
▌ Aécio Neves (PSDB)
▌ Ana Paula Leão (PP)
▌ Ana Pimentel (PT)
▌ André Janones (Avante)
▌ Pinheirinho (PP)
▌ Bruno Farias (Avante)
▌ Célia Xakriabá (PSOL)
▌ Dandara Tonantzin (PT)
▌ Diego Andrade (PSD)
▌ Dimas Fabiano (PP)
▌ Domingos Sávio (PL)
▌ Duda Salabert (PSOL)
▌ Emidinho Madeira (PL)
▌ Eros Biondini (PL)
▌ Euclydes Pettersen (Republicanos)
▌ Fred Costa (PRD)
▌ Dr. Frederico (PRD)
▌ Gilberto Abramo (Republicanos)
▌ Greyce Elias (Avante)
▌ Hercilio Coelho Diniz (MDB)
▌ Igor Timo (PODE)
▌ Delegada Ione (Avante)
▌ Padre João (PT)
▌ Zé Silva (Solidariedade)
▌ Zé Vitor (PL)
▌ Junio Amaral (PL)
▌ Lafayette de Andrada (Republicanos)
▌ Leonardo Monteiro (PT)
▌ Lincoln Portela (PL)
▌ Luis Tibé (Avante)
▌ Luiz Fernando Faria (PSD)
▌ Marcelo Álvaro Antônio (PL)
▌ Delegado Marcelo Freitas (UNIÃO)
▌ Mário Heringer (PDT)
▌ Maurício Souza (PL)
▌ Miguel Ângelo (PT)
▌ Misael Varella (PSD)
▌ Nely Aquino (PODE)
▌ Newton Cardoso Jr(MDB)
▌ Nikolas Ferreira (PL)
▌ Odair Cunha (PT)
▌ Patrus Ananias (PT)
▌ Paulo Abi-Ackel (PSDB)
▌ Paulo Guedes (PT)
▌ Pedro Aihara (PRD)
▌ Rafael Simões (UNIÃO)
▌ Reginaldo Lopes (PT)
▌ Rodrigo de Castro (UNIÃO)
▌ Rogério Correia (PT)
▌ Rosângela Reis (PL)
▌ Samuel Viana (PL)
▌ Stefano Aguiar (PSD)
▌ Weliton Prado (PROS)

==== Pará ====
▌ Airton Faleiro (PT)
▌ Andreia Siqueira (MDB)
▌ Alessandra Haber (MDB)
▌ Antônio Doido (MDB)
▌ Celso Sabino (UNIÃO), until 18 July 2023

▌ Hélio Leite (UNIÃO), from 25 July 2023

▌ Dilvanda Faro (PT)
▌ Éder Mauro (PL)
▌ Elcione Barbalho (MDB)
▌ Henderson Pinto (MDB)
▌ Joaquim Passarinho (PL)
▌ José Priante (MDB)
▌ Júnior Ferrari (PSD)
▌ Keniston Braga (MDB)
▌ Delegado Caveira (PL)
▌ Olival Marques (MDB)
▌ Raimundo Santos (PSD)
▌ Renilce Nicodemos (MDB)

==== Paraíba ====
▌ Aguinaldo Ribeiro (PP)
▌ Damião Feliciano (UNIÃO)
▌ Mersinho Lucena (PP)
▌ Gervásio Maia (PSB)
▌ Cabo Gilberto Silva (PL)
▌ Hugo Motta (Republicanos)
▌ Luiz Couto (PT)
▌ Murilo Galdino (Republicanos)
▌ Romero Rodrigues (PSC)
▌ Ruy Carneiro (PSC)
▌ Wellington Roberto (PL)
▌ Wilson Santiago (Republicanos)

==== Paraná ====
▌ Aliel Machado (PV)
▌ Beto Preto (PSD), until 19 April 2023

▌ Luciano Alves (PSD), from 19 April 2023

▌ Beto Richa (PSDB)
▌ Carol Dartora (PT)
▌ Deltan Dallagnol (PODE), until 6 June 2023 (Note: Expelled due to a decision ruled by the Superior Electoral Court.)

▌ Luiz Carlos Hauly (PODE), from 13 June 2023

▌ Diego Garcia (Republicanos)
▌ Dilceu Sperafico (PP)
▌ Enio Verri (PT), until 14 March 2023 (Note: Resigned to assume office as director of Itaipu Binacional.)

▌ Elton Welter (PT), from 14 March 2023

▌ Felipe Francischini (UNIÃO)
▌ Fernando Giacobo (PL)
▌ Filipe Barros (PL)
▌ Geraldo Mendes (UNIÃO)
▌ Gilson Fahur (PSD)
▌ Gleisi Hoffmann (PT)
▌ Leandre Dal Ponte (PSD), until 15 February 2023

▌ Rodrigo Estacho (PSD), from 15 February 2023

▌ Luciano Ducci (PSB)
▌ Luísa Canziani (PSD)
▌ Luiz Carlos Hauly (PODE)
▌ Luiz Nishimori (PSD)
▌ Matheus Laiola (UNIÃO)
▌ Nelsi Conguetto (PL)
▌ Padovani (UNIÃO)
▌ Paulo Litro (PSD)
▌ Pedro Lupion (PP)
▌ Ricardo Barros (PP), until 7 February 2023

▌ Marco Brasil (PP), from 7 February 2023

▌ Sandro Alex (PSD), until 4 February 2023

▌ Reinhold Stephanes (PSD), from 5 February 2023

▌ Sérgio Souza (MDB)
▌ Tadeu Veneri (PT)
▌ Tião Medeiros (PP)
▌ Toninho Wandscheer (PP)
▌ Zeca Dirceu (PT)

==== Pernambuco ====
▌ André Ferreira (PL)
▌ Augusto Coutinho (Republicanos)
▌ Carlos Veras (PT)
▌ Clarissa Tércio (PP)
▌ Clodoaldo Magalhães (PV)
▌ Eduardo da Fonte (PP)
▌ Eriberto Medeiros (PSB)
▌ Eurico da Silva (PL)
▌ Felipe Carreras (PSB)
▌ Fernando Coelho Filho (UNIÃO)
▌ Fernando Monteiro (PP)
▌ Fernando Rodolfo (PL)
▌ Guilherme Uchoa Júnior (PSB)
▌ Iza Arruda (MDB)
▌ Lucas Ramos (PSB)
▌ Luciano Bivar (UNIÃO)
▌ Luiz Meira (PL)
▌ Lula da Fonte (PP)
▌ Maria Arraes (Solidariedade)
▌ Mendonça Filho (UNIÃO)
▌ Pedro Campos (PSB)
▌ Renildo Calheiros (PCdoB)
▌ Silvio Costa Filho (Republicanos), until 13 September 2023

▌ Ossesio Silva, from 13 September 2023

▌ Túlio Gadêlha (REDE)
▌ Waldemar Oliveira (Avante)

==== Piauí ====
▌ Átila Lira (PP)
▌ Castro Neto (PSD)
▌ Flavio Nogueira (PT)
▌ Florentino Neto (PT)
▌ Francisco Costa (PT)
▌ Jadyel Alencar (PV)
▌ Júlio Arcoverde (PP)
▌ Julio César (PSD)
▌ Marcos Aurélio Sampaio (PSD)
▌ Merlong Solano (PT)

==== Rio de Janeiro ====
▌ Alexandre Ramagem (PL), until 18 December 2025 (Note: Removed from the Chamber after conviction on the coup plot trial.)

▌ Flávio Campos (PL), from TBD

▌ Altineu Côrtes (PL)
▌ Aureo Ribeiro (Solidariedade)
▌ Bandeira de Mello (PSB)
▌ Benedita da Silva (PT)
▌ Carlos Jordy (PL)
▌ Carlos Roberto Rodrigues (PP)
▌ Chico Alencar (PSOL)
▌ Chiquinho Brazão (Ind.), until 24 April 2025

▌ Ricardo Abrão (UNIÃO), from 25 April 2025

▌ Chris Tonietto (PL)
▌ Daniel Soranz (PSD), until 23 May 2023

▌ Caio Vianna (PSD), from 23 May 2023

▌ Daniela Carneiro (UNIÃO)
▌ Dani Cunha (UNIÃO)
▌ Dimas Gadelha (PT)
▌ Eduardo Pazuello (PL)
▌ Glauber Braga (PSOL), until 11 December 2025 (Note: Suspended for 6 months for breaching internal rules.)

▌ Heloísa Helena (REDE), from 16 December 2025

▌ Gutemberg Reis (MDB)
▌ Hélio Lopes (PL)
▌ Henrique Vieira (PSOL)
▌ Hugo Leal (PSD), until 6 October 2023

▌ Jones Moura (PSD), from 6 October 2023

▌ Jandira Feghali (PCdoB)
▌ Jorge Braz (Republicanos)
▌ Sargento Portugal (PODE)
▌ Julio Lopes (PP)
▌ Laura Carneiro (PSD)
▌ Lindbergh Farias (PT)
▌ Luciano Vieira (PL)
▌ Luis Carlos Gomes (Republicanos)
▌ Luiz Lima (NOVO)
▌ Dr. Luizinho (PP)
▌ Marcelo Crivella (Republicanos)
▌ Marcelo Queiroz (PP)
▌ Marcos Soares (UNIÃO)
▌ Marcos Tavares (PDT)
▌ Max Lemos (PROS)
▌ Murillo Gouvêa (UNIÃO)
▌ Otoni de Paula (MDB)
▌ Pedro Paulo (PSD)
▌ Reimont Otoni (PT)
▌ Roberto Monteiro (PL)
▌ Juninho do Pneu (UNIÃO)
▌ Rosângela Gomes (Republicanos), until 8 February 2023

▌ Luiz Carlos Gomes (Republicanos), from 8 February 2023

▌ Soraya Santos (PL)
▌ Sóstenes Cavalcante (PL)
▌ Talíria Petrone (PSOL)
▌ Tarcísio Motta (PSOL)
▌ Washington Siqueira (PT), until 1 January 2025 (Note: Resigned to assume office as Mayor of Maricá.)

▌ Rejane de Almeida (PCdoB), from 1 January 2025

==== Rio Grande do Norte ====
▌ Benes Leocádio (UNIÃO)
▌ Eliéser Girão (PL)
▌ Sargento Gonçalves (PL)
▌ Fernando Vargas (PT)
▌ João Maia (PL)
▌ Natália Bonavides (PT)
▌ Paulo da Costa Freire (UNIÃO), until 1 January 2025 (Note: Resigned to assume office as Mayor of Natal.)

▌ Carla Dickson (UNIÃO), from 1 January 2025

▌ Robinson Faria (PL)

==== Rio Grande do Sul ====
▌ Afonso Hamm (PP)
▌ Afonso Motta (PDT)
▌ Alceu Moreira (MDB)
▌ Alexandre Lindenmeyer (PT)
▌ Any Machado Ortiz (Cidadania)
▌ Bibo Nunes (PL)
▌ Bohn Gass (PT)
▌ Carlos Gomes (Republicanos), until 8 November 2023

▌ Ronaldo Nogueira (Republicanos), from 8 November 2023

▌ Covatti Filho (PP)
▌ Daiana Santos (PCdoB)
▌ Daniel Trzeciak (PSDB)
▌ Danrlei de Deus Hinterholz (PSD), until 2 March 2023

▌ Luciano Azevedo (PSD), from 2 March 2023

▌ Denise Pessôa (PT)
▌ Dionilso Marcon (PT)
▌ Fernanda Melchionna (PSOL)
▌ Franciane Bayer (Republicanos)
▌ Giovani Cherini (PL)
▌ Heitor Schuch (PSB)
▌ Lucas Redecker (PSDB)
▌ Luciano Zucco (PL)
▌ Luiz Carlos Busato (UNIÃO)
▌ Marcel Van Hattem (NOVO)
▌ Marcelo Moraes (PL)
▌ Márcio Biolchi (MDB)
▌ Maria do Rosário (PT)
▌ Mauricio Marcon (PODE)
▌ Osmar Terra (MDB)
▌ Paulo Pimenta (PT)
▌ Pedro Westphalen (PP)
▌ Pompeo de Mattos (PDT)
▌ Sanderson (PL)

==== Rondônia ====
▌ Chrisóstomo de Moura (PL)
▌ Cristiane Lopes (UNIÃO)
▌ Fernando Máximo (UNIÃO)
▌ Jose Clemente (UNIÃO), until 31 July 2025

▌ Rafael Fera (PODE), from 31 July 2025

▌ Lucio Mosquini (MDB)
▌ Maurício Carvalho (UNIÃO)
▌ Silvia Cristina (PL)
▌ Thiago Flores (MDB)

==== Roraima ====
▌ Antonio Albuquerque (Republicanos)
▌ Nicoletti (UNIÃO)
▌ Duda Ramos (MDB)
▌ Pastor Diniz (UNIÃO)
▌ Zé Haroldo Cathedral (PSD)
▌ Helena da Asatur (MDB)
▌ Jhonatan de Jesus (Republicanos), until 8 March 2023 (Note: Resigned to assume office of minister of the Federal Court of Accounts.)

▌ Gabriel Mota (Republicanos), from 8 March 2023

▌ Defensor Stélio Dener (Republicanos)

==== Santa Catarina ====
▌ Ana Paula Lima (PT)
▌ Carlos Chiodini (MDB)
▌ Caroline de Toni (PL)
▌ Daniel Freitas (PL)
▌ Daniela Reinehr (PL)
▌ Fabio Schiochet (UNIÃO)
▌ Carmen Zanotto (Cidadania), until 1 January 2025 (Note: Resigned to assume office as Mayor of Lages.)

▌ Geovania de Sá (PSDB), from 3 February 2023

▌ Gilson Marques (NOVO)
▌ Ismael dos Santos (PSD)
▌ Jorge Goetten (PL)
▌ Julia Zanatta (PL)
▌ Zé Trovão (PL)
▌ Pedro Uczai (PT)
▌ Pezenti (MDB)
▌ Ricardo Guidi (PSD), until 1 August 2023

▌ Darci de Matos (PSD), from 1 August 2023

▌ Valdir Cobalchini (MDB)

==== São Paulo ====
▌ Adriana Ventura (NOVO)
▌ Alberto Mourão (MDB), until 1 January 2025 (Note: Resigned to assume office as Mayor of Praia Grande.)

▌ João Cury (MDB), from 7 January 2025

▌ Alencar Santana (PT)
▌ Alex Manente (Cidadania)
▌ Alexandre Leite (UNIÃO)
▌ Alexandre Padilha (PT), until 2 February 2023

▌ Orlando Silva (PCdoB), from 2 February 2023

▌ Antonio Carlos Rodrigues (PL)
▌ Arlindo Chinaglia (PT)
▌ Arnaldo Jardim (Cidadania)
▌ Augusto Rosa (PL)
▌ Baleia Rossi (MDB)
▌ Bruno Ganem (PODE)
▌ Bruno Lima (PP), until 4 August 2023

▌ Paulo Telhada (PP), from 4 August 2023

▌ Carla Zambelli (PL), until 14 December 2025

▌ Adilson Barroso (PL), from TBD

▌ Delegado Da Cunha (PP)
▌ Carlos Sampaio (PSDB)
▌ Carlos Zarattini (PT)
▌ Celso Russomanno (Republicanos)
▌ Cezinha de Madureira (PSD)
▌ David Soares (UNIÃO)
▌ Eduardo Bolsonaro (PL), until 18 December 2025 (Note: Removed from the Chamber for excess of absences.)

▌ José Olímpio (PL), from TBD

▌ Erika Hilton (PSOL)
▌ Fábio Teruel (MDB)
▌ Fausto Pinato (PP)
▌ Felipe Becari (UNIÃO), until 20 December 2023

▌ Douglas Viegas, from 20 December 2023

▌ Fernando Marangoni (UNIÃO)
▌ Gilberto Nascimento (PSD)
▌ Guilherme Boulos (PSOL), until 21 October 2025

▌ Ricardo Galvão (REDE), from 29 October 2025

▌ Guilherme Derrite (PP)
▌ Jefferson Campos (PL)
▌ Jilmar Tatto (PT)
▌ Jonas Donizette (PSB)
▌ Juliana Cardoso (PT)
▌ Kiko Celeguim (PT)
▌ Kim Kataguiri (UNIÃO)
▌ Luiz Carlos Motta (PL)
▌ Luiz Marinho (PT), until 2 February 2023

▌ Vicente Paulo da Silva (PT), from 3 February 2023

▌ Luiz Philippe of Orléans-Braganza (PL)
▌ Luiza Erundina (PSOL)
▌ Marcelo Lima (PSB), until 7 November 2023 (Note: Mandate revoked by the Superior Electoral Court for switching parties without a reason.)

▌ Paulo Pereira da Silva (Solidariedade), from 30 November 2023

▌ Marcio Alvino (PL)
▌ Marco Bertaiolli (PSD), until 27 September 2023 (Note: Resigned to assume office as councillor of the State Court of Accounts of São Paulo.)

▌ Saulo Pedroso (PSD), since 3 October 2023

▌ Marco Feliciano (PL)
▌ Marcos Palumbo (MDB)
▌ Marcos Pereira (Republicanos)
▌ Maria Rosas (Republicanos)
▌ Marina Silva (REDE), until 3 February 2023

▌ Luciene Cavalcante (PSOL), from 3 February 2023

▌ Mario Frias (PL)
▌ Maurício Neves (PP)
▌ Miguel Lombardi (PL)
▌ Milton Vieira (Republicanos), until 5 July 2023

▌ Ely Santos (Republicanos), from 5 July 2023

▌ Nilto Tatto (PT)
▌ Paulo Alexandre Barbosa (PSDB)
▌ Paulo Bilynskyj (PL)
▌ Paulo Freire Costa (PL)
▌ Paulo Teixeira (PT), until 2 February 2023

▌ Alfredo Cavalcante (PT), from 7 February 2023

▌ Renata Abreu (PODE)
▌ Ricardo Salles (NOVO)
▌ Ricardo Silva (PSD), until 18 December 2024 (Note: Resigned to assume office as Mayor of Ribeirão Preto.)

▌ Ribamar Silva (PSD), from 18 December 2024

▌ Rodrigo Gambale (PODE)
▌ Rosana Valle (PL)
▌ Rosangela Moro (UNIÃO)
▌ Rui Falcão (PT)
▌ Sâmia Bomfim (PSOL)
▌ Simone Marquetto (MDB)
▌ Sônia Guajajara (PSOL), until 3 February 2023

▌ Ivan Valente (PSOL), from 3 February 2023

▌ Tabata Amaral (PSB)
▌ Tiririca (PL)
▌ Vinicius Carvalho (Republicanos)
▌ Vitor Lippi (PSDB)

==== Sergipe ====
▌ Fábio Reis (PSD)
▌ Icaro de Valmir (PL)
▌ João Daniel (PT)
▌ Delegada Katarina (PSD)
▌ Gustinho Ribeiro (Republicanos)
▌ Rodrigo Valadares (UNIÃO)
▌ Thiago de Joaldo (PP)
▌ Yandra de André (UNIÃO)

==== Tocantins ====
▌ Alexandre Guimarães (Republicanos)
▌ Antonio Andrade (Republicanos)
▌ Carlos Henrique Gaguim (UNIÃO)
▌ Eli Borges (PL)
▌ Filipe Martins (PL)
▌ Lázaro Botelho (PP), until 31 July 2025

▌ Tiago Dimas (PODE), from 31 July 2025

▌ Ricardo Ayres (Republicanos)
▌ Vicentinho Júnior (PP)

== Commissions ==
=== Federal Senate ===
Commission	Chair
Agriculture and Agrarian Reform	Zequinha Marinho (PODE-PA)
Communication and Digital Law	TBA
Constitution, Justice and Citizenship	Otto Alencar (PSD-BA)
Defense of Democracy	TBA
Economic Affairs	Renan Calheiros (MDB-AL)
Education and Culture	Teresa Leitao (PT-PE)
Environment	Fabiano Contarato (PT-ES)
Ethics and Parliamentary Decorum	TBA
External Relations and National Defence	Nelson Trad Filho (PSD-MS)
Human Rights and Participative Legislation	Damares Alves (Republicanos-DF)
Infrastructure Services	Marcos Rogério (PL-RO)
Public Security	Flávio Bolsonaro (PL-RJ)
Regional Development and Tourism	Dorinha Seabra (UNIÃO-TO)
Science, Technology, Innovation and Computing	Flávio Arns (PSB-PR)
Social Affairs	Marcelo Castro (MDB-PI)
Sports	Leila Barros (PDT-DF)
Transparency, Governance, Inspection and Control and Consumer Defence	Hiran Gonçalves (PP-RR)

=== Chamber of Deputies ===
Commission	Chair
Administration and Public Service	TBA
Agriculture, Livestock, Supply and Rural Development	Rodolfo Nogueira (PL-MS)
Amazon and Originary and Traditional People	Dandara Tonantzin (PT-MG)
Communication	Julio Cesar Ribeiro (Republicanos-DF)
Consumer Defence	Daniel Almeida (PCdoB-BA)
Constitution, Justice and Citizenship	Paulo Azi (UNIÃO-BA)
Culture	Denise Pessôa (PT-RS)
Defense of Elderly People Rights	Zé Silva (Solidariedade-MG)
Defense of People with Disabilities Rights	Hildelis Duarte Jr. (PSB-MA)
Defense of Women Rights	Célia Xakriabá (PSOL-MG)
Economic Development	Lafayette de Andrada (Republicanos-MG)
Education	Maurício Carvalho (UNIÃO-RO)
Environment and Sustainable Development	Elcione Barbalho (MDB-PA)
Ethics and Parliamentary Decorum	Leur Lomanto Júnior (UNIÃO-BA)
Finances and Taxation	Rogério Correia (PT-MG)
Financial Oversight and Control	João Carlos Bacelar Batista (PV-BA)
Foreign Affairs and National Defence	Filipe Barros (PL-PR)
Health	Zé Vitor (PL-MG)
Human Rights, Minorities and Racial Equality	Reimont Otoni (PT-RJ)
Industry, Trade and Services	Beto Richa (PSDB-PR)
Labour	Leo Prates (PDT-BA)
Mines and Energy	Diego Andrade (PSD-MG)
National Integration and Regional Development	Yandra Moura (UNIÃO-SE)
Participative Legislation	Fred Costa (PRD-MG)
Public Security and Fight Against Organized Crime	Paulo Bilynskyj (PL-SP)
Roads and Transports	Maurício Neves (PP-SP)
Science, Technology and Innovation	Ricardo Barros (PP-PR)
Social Security, Social Assistance, Childhood, Adolescence and Family	Ruy Carneiro (PODE-PB)
Sports	Laura Carneiro (PSD-RJ)
Tourism	Marcelo Álvaro Antônio (PL-MG)
Urban Development	TBA

=== Parliamentary Inquiry Commissions ===
Commission	Reason	Chair	Rapporteur	House	Status
8 January Congress attack	Investigate the acts of action and omission occurred on 8 January at the Three Powers Plaza in Brasília	Arthur Maia (UNIÃO-BA)	Eliziane Gama (PSD-MA)	National Congress	Finished
Americanas S.A.	Investigate the inconsistencies in the order of R$ 20 billion detected in accounting entries of the company Americanas S.A made in the year 2022 and in previous years	Gustinho Ribeiro (Republicanos-SE)	Carlos Chiodini (MDB-SC)	Chamber of Deputies	Finished
Manipulation in football matches results	Investigate schemes of manipulation of professional football matches results in Brazil	Júlio Arcoverde (PP-PI)	Felipe Carreras (PSB-PE)	Chamber of Deputies	Finished
Landless Workers' Movement	Investigate the acts of the group Landless Workers' Movement, their real purpose and their financiers	Luciano Zucco (Republicanos-RS)	Ricardo Salles (PL-SP)	Chamber of Deputies	Finished
Non-governmental organizations	Investigate facts related to non-governmental organizations and public interest civil society organizations	Plínio Valério (PSDB-AM)	Márcio Bittar (UNIÃO-AC)	Federal Senate	Finished
Pyramid schemes	Investigate evidences of fraudulent operations on cryptocurrencies companies	Aureo Ribeiro (Solidariedade-RJ)	Ricardo Silva (PSD-SP)	Chamber of Deputies	Finished
Braskem	Investigate the effects of socio-environmental legal responsibility of Braskem S.A., arising from Pinheiro/Braskem case in Maceió, Alagoas.	Omar Aziz (PSD-AM)	Rogério Carvalho (PT-SE)	Federal Senate	Active
