= Jorge Goetten =

Brazilian politician

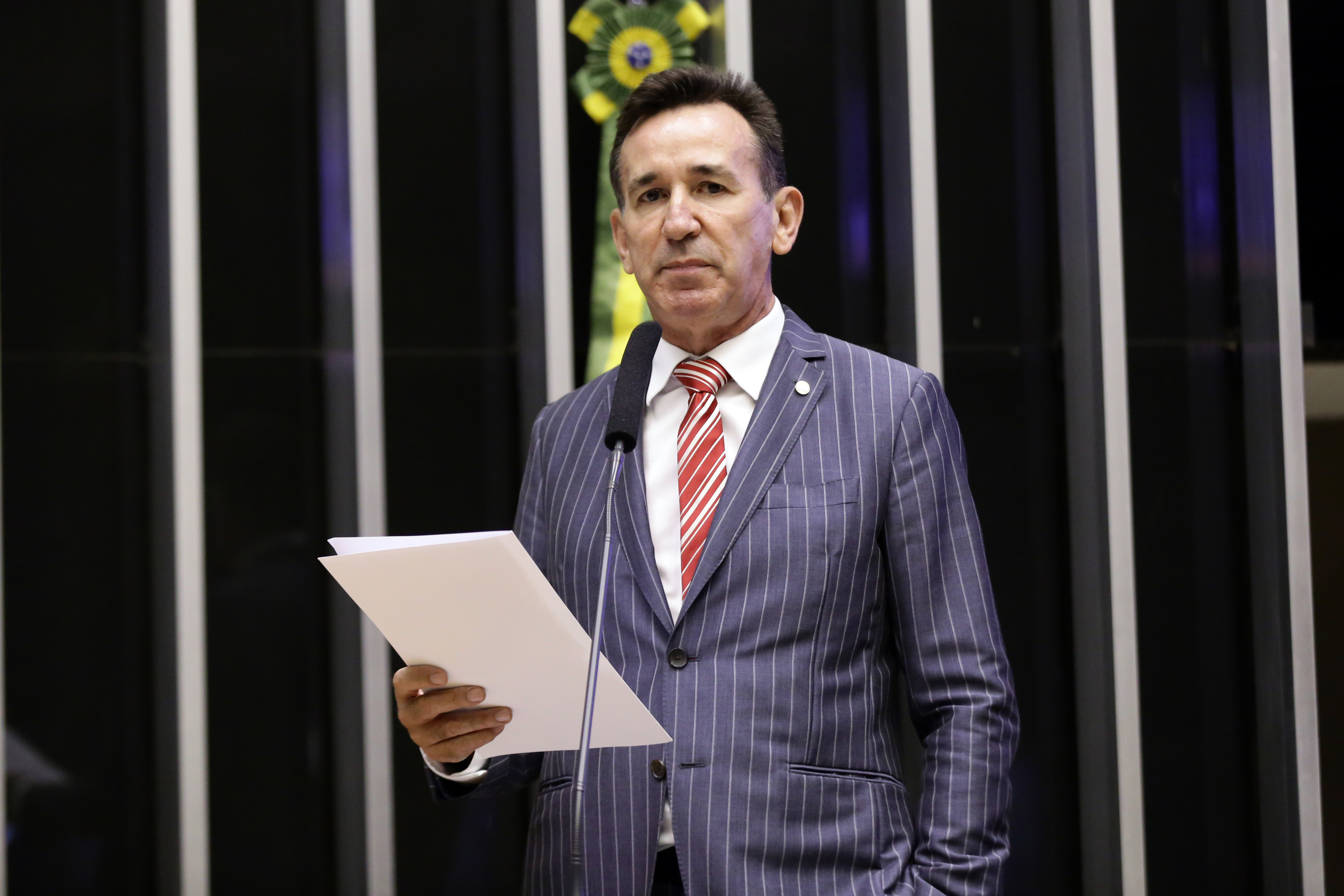
- Jorge Goetten

Member of the Chamber of Deputies
- Incumbent
- Assumed office 1 February 2023
- Constituency: Santa Catarina

Personal details
- Born: 10 April 1962 (age 64) Mirim Doce
- Party: Liberal Party (2018-2022) Republicans (since 2022)

Jorge Goetten de Lima (born April 10, 1962, in Mirim Doce) is a Brazilian politician, affiliated with the Republicans (REP) party.

He assumed the mandate of Federal Deputy as an alternate, in the 2019-2023 Legislature, from October 6, 2020, to January 30, 2021, following the return of the incumbent Rogério Peninha Mendonça.

In the 2022 elections, he was elected federal deputy for Santa Catarina with 159,339 votes (2.72% of valid votes).
