= Pastor Diniz =

Brazilian politician (born 1980)

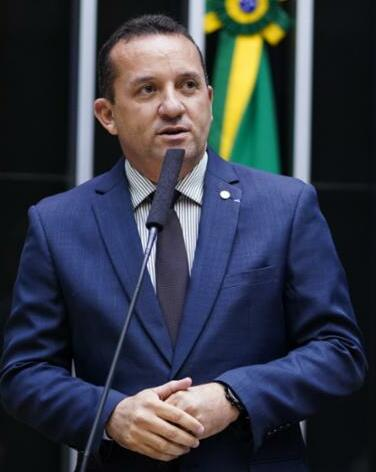
- Diniz in 2023

Member of the Chamber of Deputies
- Incumbent
- Assumed office 1 February 2023
- Constituency: Roraima

Personal details
- Born: 21 March 1980 (age 46)
- Party: Brazil Union (since 2022)

Raimundo Diniz Araújo (born 21 March 1980), better known as Pastor Diniz, is a Brazilian politician serving as a member of the Chamber of Deputies since 2023. He has served as chairman of the Brazil Union in Roraima since 2025.
