= Maurício Neves =

Brazilian politician (born 1979)

Member of the Chamber of Deputies
- Incumbent
- Assumed office 1 February 2023
- Constituency: São Paulo

Personal details
- Born: 5 November 1979 (age 46)
- Party: Progressistas

Manoel Maurício Silva Neves (born 5 November 1979) is a Brazilian politician serving as a member of the Chamber of Deputies since 2023. He has served as chairman of the transport committee since 2025.
