= Cristiane Lopes =

Brazilian politician (born 1983)

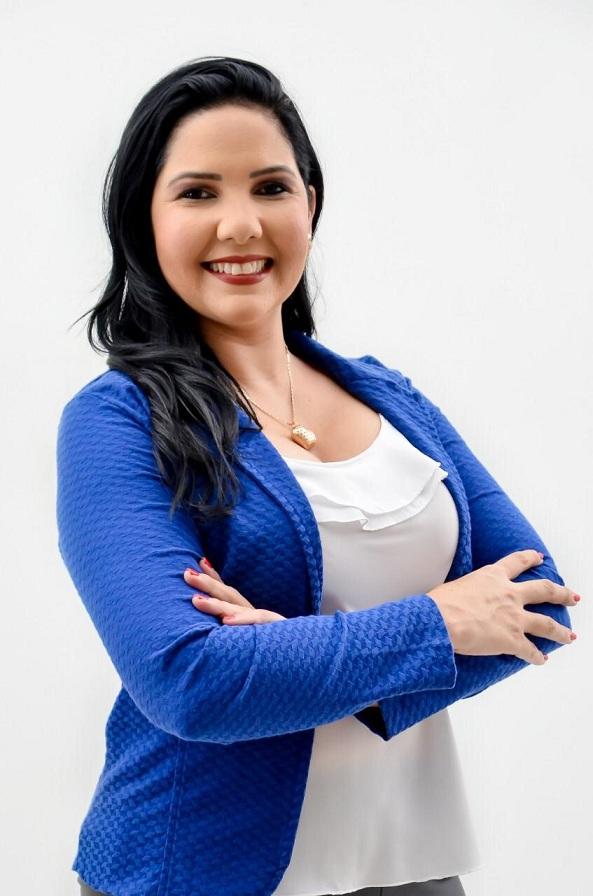
- Lopes in 2022

Member of the Chamber of Deputies
- Incumbent
- Assumed office 1 February 2023
- Constituency: Rondônia

Personal details
- Born: 17 November 1983 (age 42)
- Party: Podemos (since 2026)

Cristiane Lopes da Luz Benarrosh (born 17 November 1983) is a Brazilian politician serving as a member of the Chamber of Deputies since 2023. From 2017 to 2020, she was a municipal councillor of Porto Velho.
