= Thiago de Joaldo =

Brazilian politician (born 1982)

- Thiago de Joaldo

Member of the Chamber of Deputies
- Incumbent
- Assumed office 1 February 2023
- Constituency: Sergipe

Personal details
- Born: 20 June 1982 (age 44)
- Party: Republicanos (2026–present)
- Other political affiliations: Progressistas (2022–2026)

Jose Thiago Alves de Carvalho (born 20 June 1982), better known as Thiago de Joaldo, is a Brazilian politician serving as a member of the Chamber of Deputies since 2023. From 2017 to 2020, he served as secretary of education of Itabaianinha.
