= Paulo Litro =

Brazilian politician (born 1991)

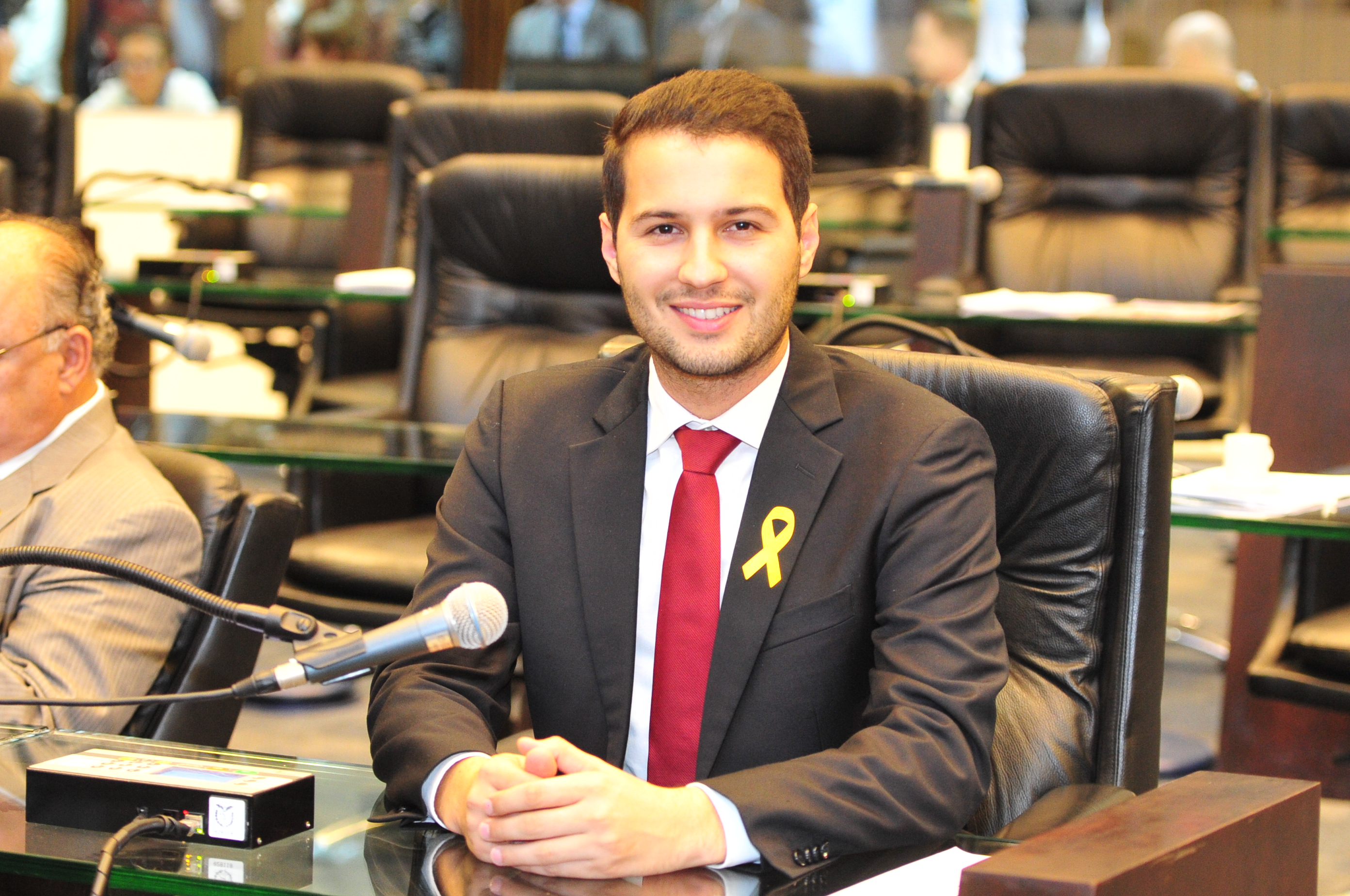
- Litro in 2017

Member of the Chamber of Deputies
- Incumbent
- Assumed office 1 February 2023
- Constituency: Paraná

Personal details
- Born: 30 October 1991 (age 34)
- Party: Social Democratic Party (since 2022)
- Relatives: Adão Litro (uncle)

Paulo Henrique Coletti Fernandes, better known as Paulo Litro (born 30 October 1991), is a Brazilian politician serving as a member of the Chamber of Deputies since 2023. From 2015 to 2023, he was a member of the Legislative Assembly of Paraná.
