= Zé Haroldo Cathedral =

Brazilian politician (born 1982)

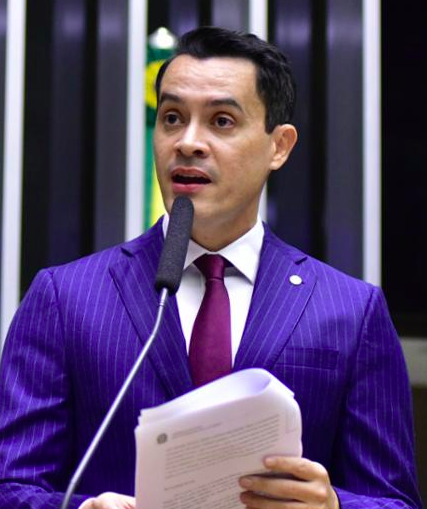
- Cathedral in 2023

Member of the Chamber of Deputies
- Incumbent
- Assumed office 1 February 2023
- Constituency: Roraima

Personal details
- Born: José Haroldo Figueiredo Campos; 22 March 1982 (age 44) Cuiabá, Mato Grosso, Brazil
- Party: UNIÃO (2026–present)
- Other political affiliations: PSD (2020–2026)

José Haroldo Figueiredo Campos (born 22 March 1982), better known as Zé Haroldo Cathedral, is a Brazilian politician serving as a member of the Chamber of Deputies since 2023. He is the son of Haroldo Cathedral.
