= Dr. Benjamim =

Brazilian politician (born 1973)

Mayor of Açailândia
- Incumbent
- Assumed office 1 January 2025
- Preceded by: Aluísio Silva Sousa

Member of the Chamber of Deputies
- In office 1 February 2023 – 1 January 2025
- Succeeded by: Ivan Júnior
- Constituency: Maranhão

Personal details
- Born: 7 February 1973 (age 53)
- Party: Brazil Union (since 2022)

Benjamim de Oliveira (born 7 February 1973), better known as Dr. Benjamim, is a Brazilian politician serving as mayor of Açailândia since 2025. From 2023 to 2025, he was a member of the Chamber of Deputies.
