= Denise Pessôa =

Brazilian politician (born 1983)

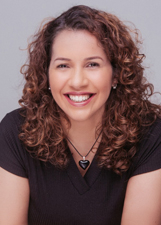
- Pessôa in 2022

Member of the Chamber of Deputies
- Incumbent
- Assumed office 1 February 2023
- Constituency: Rio Grande do Sul

Personal details
- Born: 17 June 1983 (age 43)
- Party: Workers' Party (since 2001)

Denise da Silva Pessôa (born 17 June 1983) is a Brazilian politician who has been serving as a member of the Chamber of Deputies since 2023. She was a member of the municipal chamber of Caxias do Sul from 2009 to 2022, and served as its president in 2022.
