= Lucas Ramos (politician) =

Brazilian politician (born 1986)

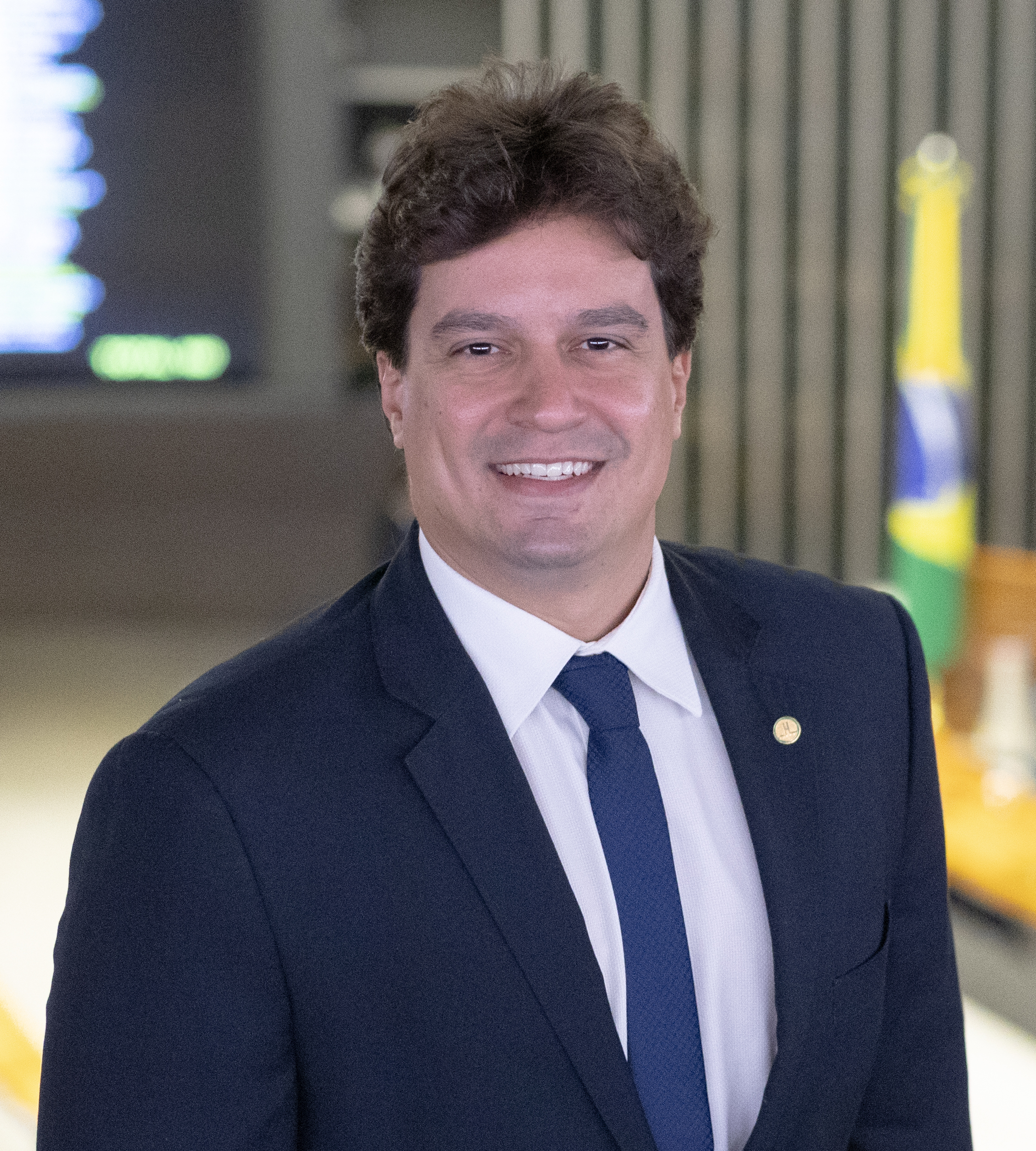
- Ramos in 2023

Member of the Chamber of Deputies
- Incumbent
- Assumed office 1 February 2023
- Constituency: Pernambuco

Personal details
- Born: 14 February 1986 (age 40)
- Party: Brazilian Socialist Party (since 2005)

Lucas Cavalcanti Ramos (born 14 February 1986) is a Brazilian politician serving as a member of the Chamber of Deputies since 2023. From 2020 to 2022, he served as secretary of science, technology and innovation of Pernambuco.
