= Pezenti =

Brazilian politician (born 1987)

Member of the Chamber of Deputies
- Incumbent
- Assumed office 1 February 2023
- Constituency: Santa Catarina

Personal details
- Born: Rafael Pezenti; 6 June 1987 (age 39) Petrolândia, Santa Catarina, Brazil
- Party: MDB (since 2011)

Rafael Pezenti (born 6 June 1987), known mononymously as Pezenti, is a Brazilian politician serving as a member of the Chamber of Deputies since 2023. He has served as vice chairman of the subcommittee on fisheries since 2024.
