= Rodolfo Nogueira =

Brazilian politician (born 1973)

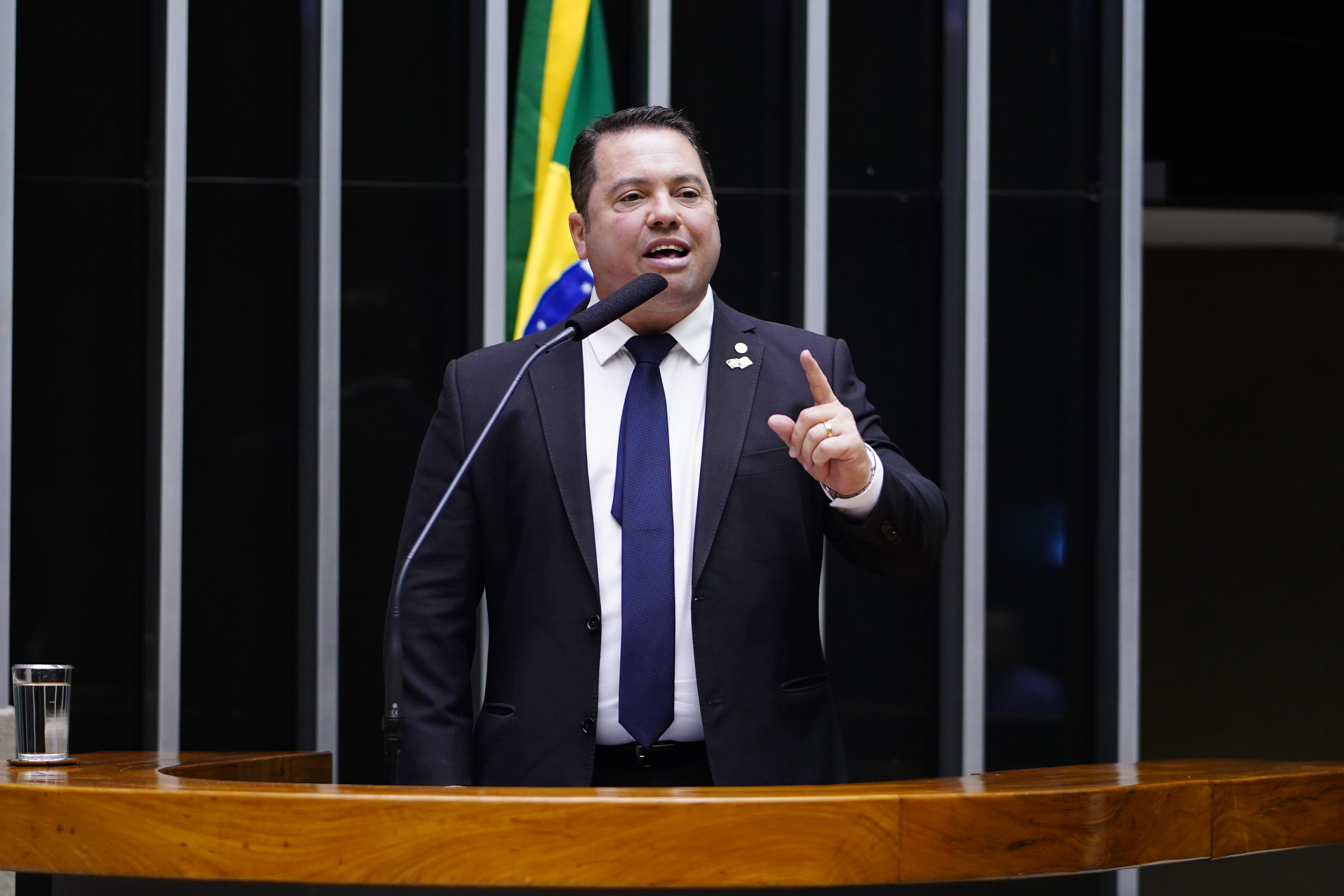
- Nogueira in 2023

Member of the Chamber of Deputies
- Incumbent
- Assumed office 1 February 2023
- Constituency: Mato Grosso do Sul

Personal details
- Born: 24 November 1973 (age 52)
- Party: Liberal Party (since 2022)

Rodolfo Oliveira Nogueira (born 24 November 1973) is a Brazilian politician serving as a member of the Chamber of Deputies since 2023. He has served as chairman of the Agriculture Committee since 2025.
