= Murillo Gouvêa =

Brazilian politician (born 1986)

Member of the Chamber of Deputies
- Incumbent
- Assumed office 1 February 2023
- Constituency: Rio de Janeiro

Personal details
- Born: 22 September 1986 (age 39)
- Party: PSDB (since 2026)

Murillo Gouvêa Rodrigues (born 22 September 1986) is a Brazilian politician serving as a member of the Chamber of Deputies since 2023. From 2013 to 2015 and from 2021 to 2022, he served as secretary of government of Itaperuna.
