= Beto Preto =

Brazilian politician (born 1968)

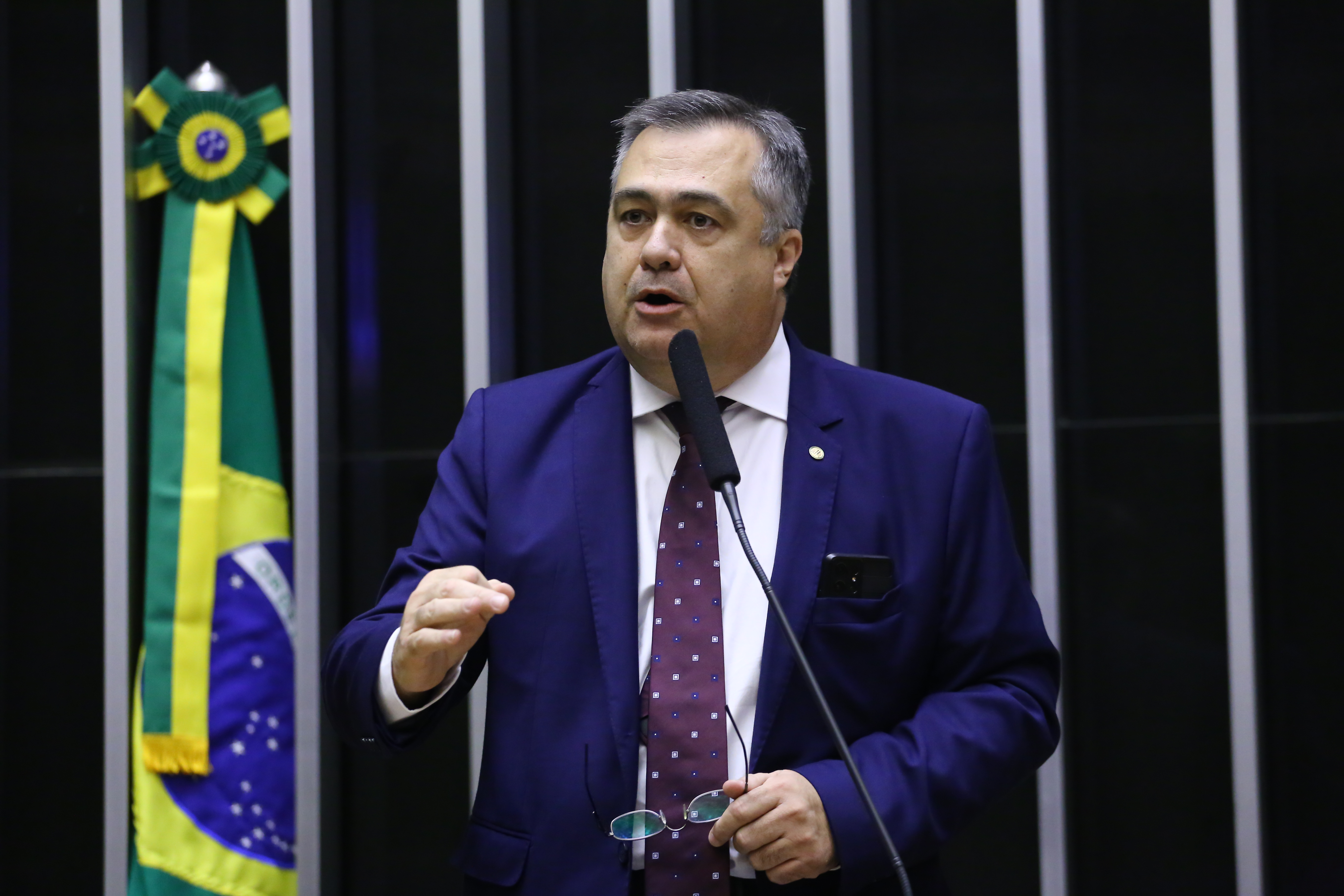
- Preto in 2023

Member of the Chamber of Deputies
- Incumbent
- Assumed office 1 February 2023
- Constituency: Paraná

Personal details
- Born: 17 February 1968 (age 58)
- Party: Social Democratic Party (since 2015)

Carlos Alberto Gebrim Preto (born 17 February 1968), better known as Beto Preto, is a Brazilian politician serving as a member of the Chamber of Deputies since 2023. From 2013 to 2019, he served as mayor of Apucarana.
