= Matheus Laiola =

Brazilian politician (born 1982)

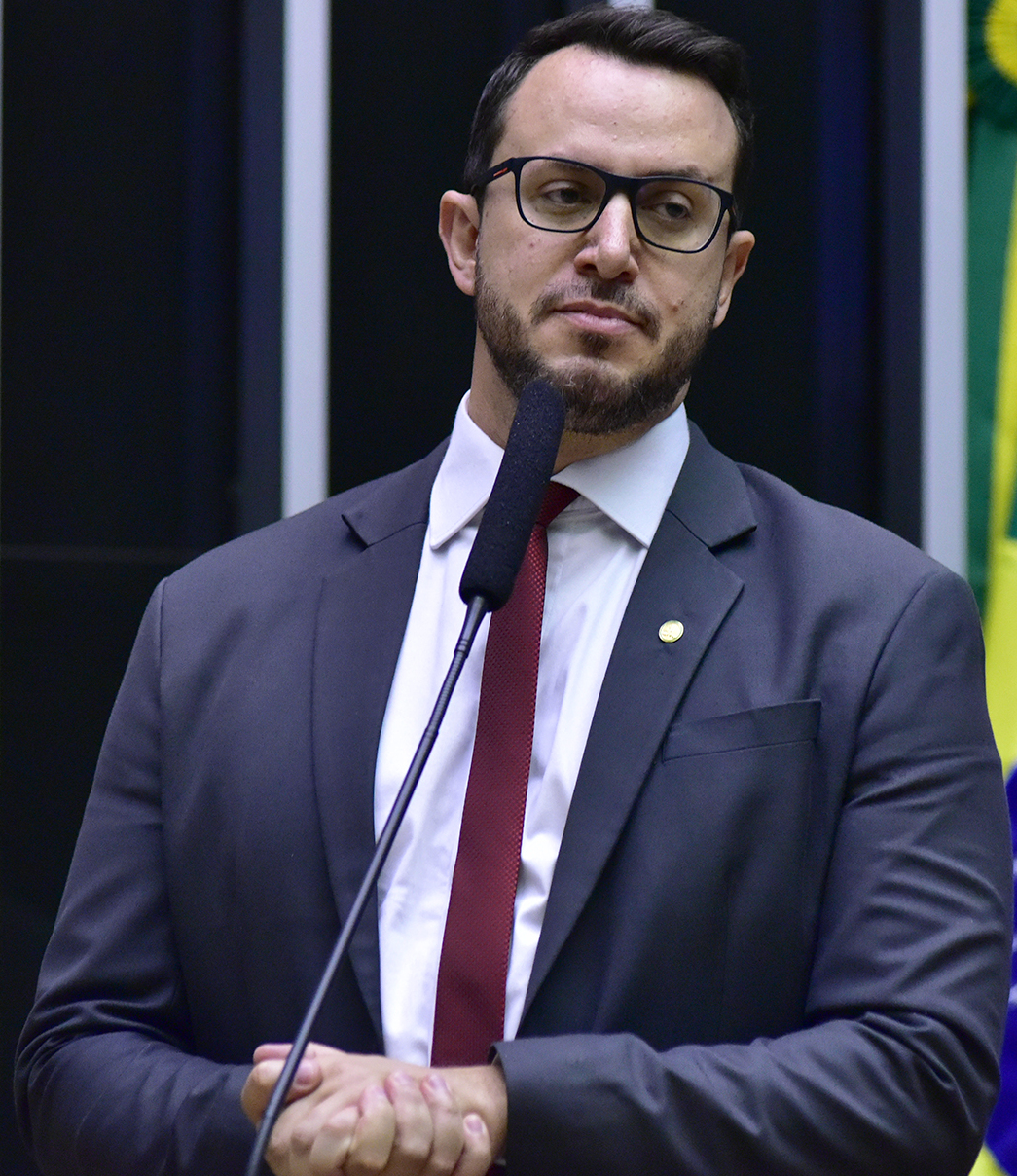
- Laiola in 2023

Member of the Chamber of Deputies
- Incumbent
- Assumed office 1 February 2023
- Constituency: Paraná

Personal details
- Born: 24 December 1982 (age 43)
- Party: Brazil Union (since 2022)

Matheus Araujo Laiola (born 24 December 1982) is a Brazilian politician serving as a member of the Chamber of Deputies since 2023. He previously served as chief of police of the environmental protection department of Curitiba.
