= Iza Arruda =

Brazilian politician (born 1987)

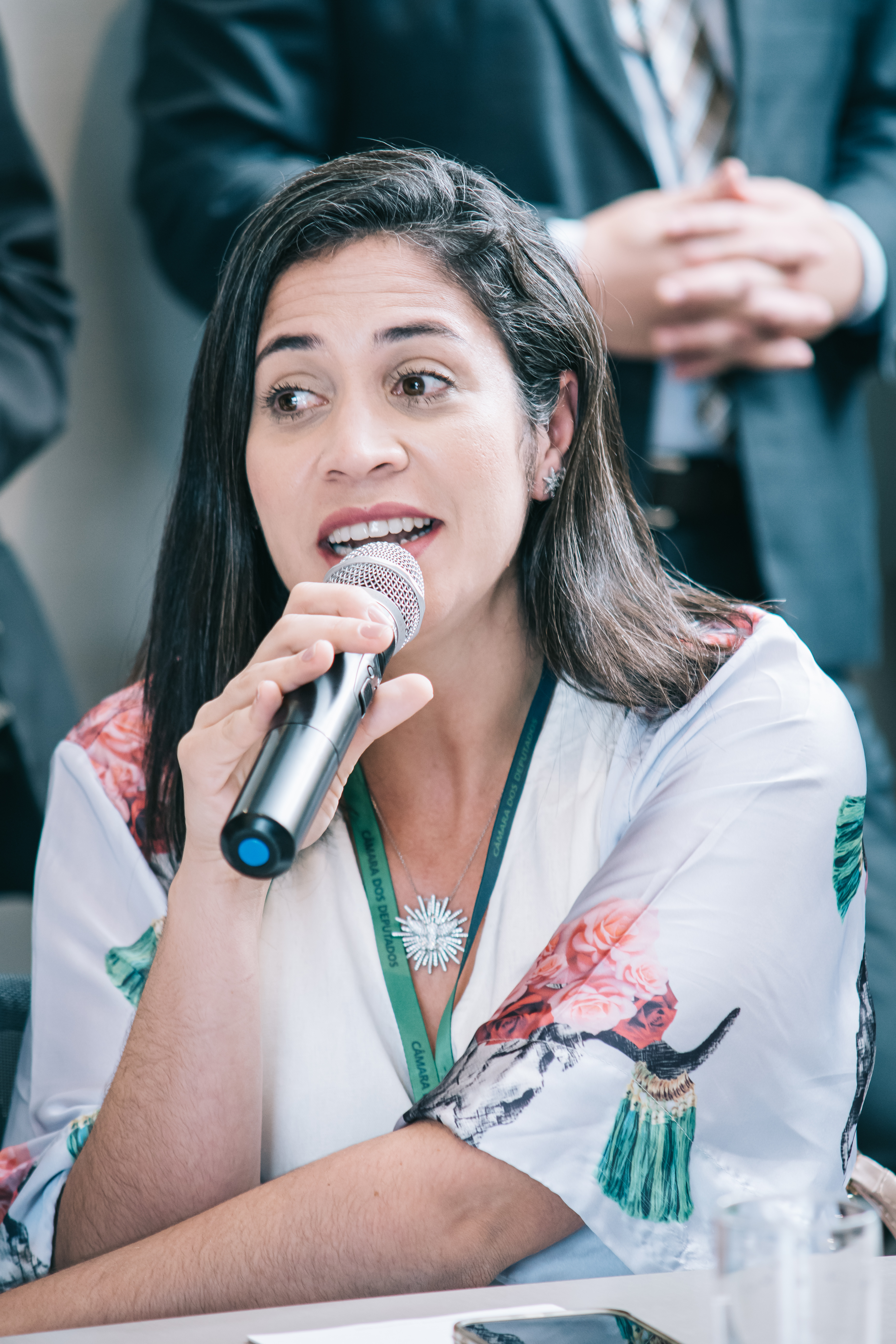
- Arruda in 2022

Member of the Chamber of Deputies
- Incumbent
- Assumed office 1 February 2023
- Constituency: Pernambuco

Personal details
- Born: 6 September 1987 (age 38)
- Party: Brazilian Democratic Movement (since 2022)

Iza Paula de Deus e Mello Albuquerque Arruda (born 6 September 1987) is a Brazilian politician serving as a member of the Chamber of Deputies since 2023. She has served as chairwoman of the subcommittee on parasports since 2025.
