= Paulo Fernando =

Brazilian politician (1967–2026)

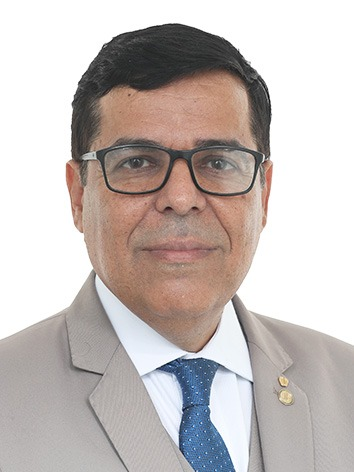

Member of the Chamber of Deputies of Brazil for the Federal District
- In office 24 October 2023 – 4 January 2024
- In office 2 August 2023 – 2 October 2023
- In office 9 May 2023 – 13 July 2023
- In office 7 March 2023 – 18 April 2023

Personal details
- Born: Paulo Fernando Melo da Costa; 11 June 1967 Brasília, Brazil
- Died: 14 March 2026 (aged 58) Brasília, Brazil
- Party: Republicans
- Occupation: Professor

Paulo Fernando Melo da Costa (11 June 1967 – 14 March 2026) was a Brazilian politician. A member of the Republicans, he served four brief terms in the Chamber of Deputies.

Fernando died in Brasília on 14 March 2026, at the age of 58.
