= Jeferson Rodrigues =

Brazilian politician (born 1975)

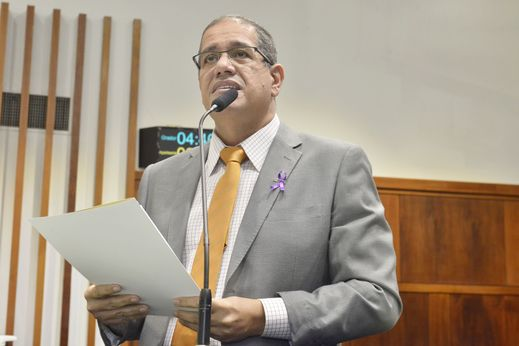
- Rodrigues in 2021

Member of the Chamber of Deputies
- Incumbent
- Assumed office 1 February 2023
- Constituency: Goiás

Personal details
- Born: 1 May 1975 (age 51)
- Party: PSDB

Jeferson Rodrigues (born 1 May 1975) is a Brazilian politician serving as a member of the Chamber of Deputies since 2023. From 2016 to 2023, he was a member of the Legislative Assembly of Goiás.
