= Ana Pimentel =

Brazilian politician (born 1982)

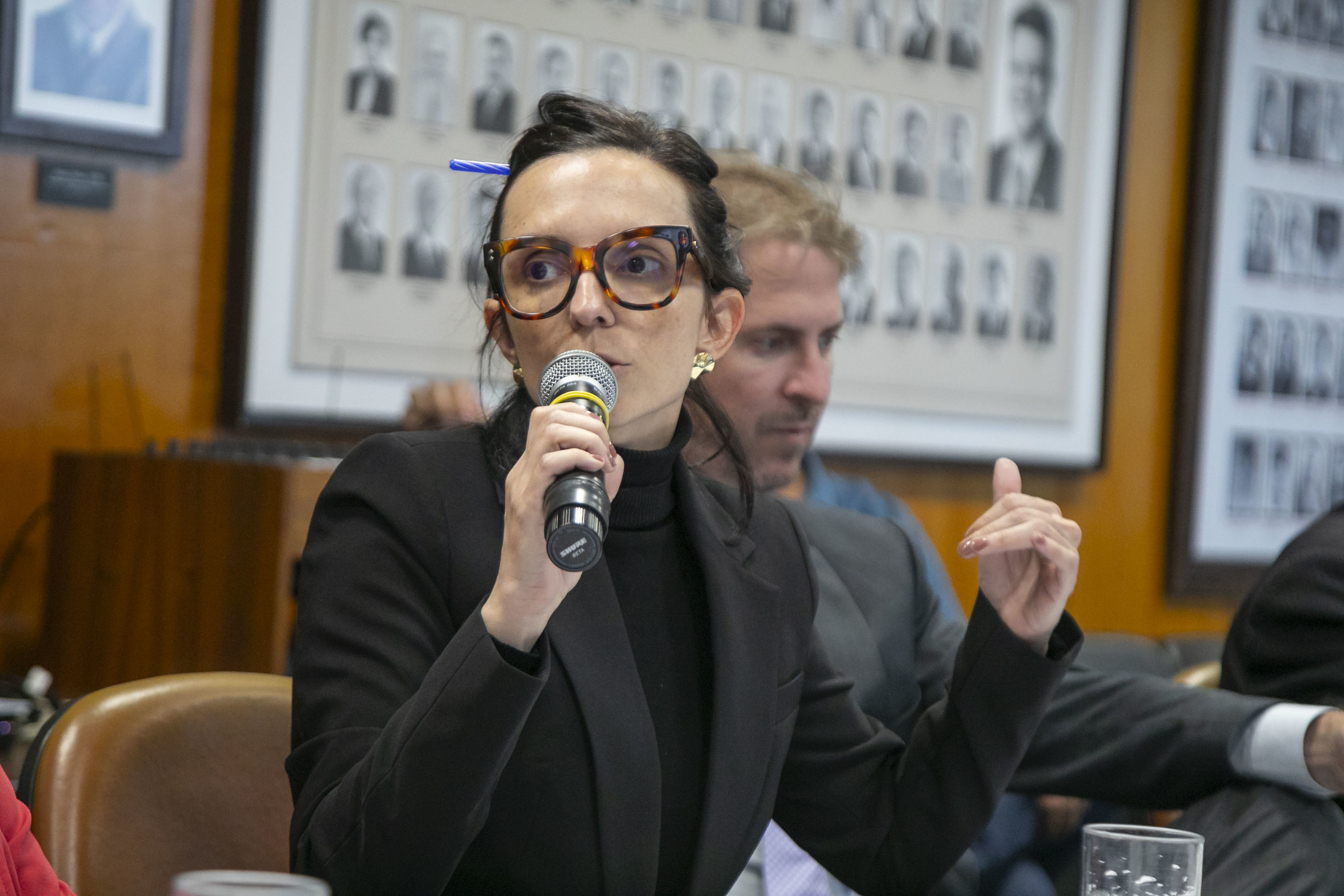
- Pimentel in 2024

Member of the Chamber of Deputies
- Incumbent
- Assumed office 1 February 2023
- Constituency: Minas Gerais

Personal details
- Born: 15 May 1982 (age 44)
- Party: Workers' Party (since 2000)

Ana Cristina de Lima Pimentel (born 15 May 1982) is a Brazilian politician serving as a member of the Chamber of Deputies since 2023. She has served as chairwoman of the women's rights committee since 2024.
