= Helena da Asatur =

Brazilian politician (born 1976)

Member of the Chamber of Deputies
- Incumbent
- Assumed office 1 February 2023
- Constituency: Roraima

Personal details
- Born: 30 March 1976 (age 50)
- Party: Brazilian Democratic Movement

Maria Helena Teixeira Lima (born 30 March 1976), better known as Helena da Asatur, is a Brazilian politician serving as a member of the Chamber of Deputies since 2023. She has served as vice president of the sports committee since 2024.
