= Antônio Doido =

Brazilian politician (born 1976)

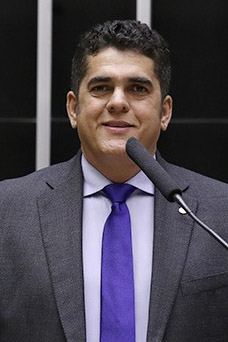
- Doido in 2024

Member of the Chamber of Deputies
- Incumbent
- Assumed office 1 February 2023
- Constituency: Pará

Personal details
- Born: 26 August 1976 (age 50)
- Party: Brazilian Democratic Movement (since 2022)

Antônio Leocádio dos Santos, better known as Antônio Doido (born 26 August 1976), is a Brazilian politician serving as a member of the Chamber of Deputies since 2023. From 2017 to 2020, he served as mayor of São Miguel do Guamá.
