= Ismael Alexandrino =

Brazilian politician (born 1983)

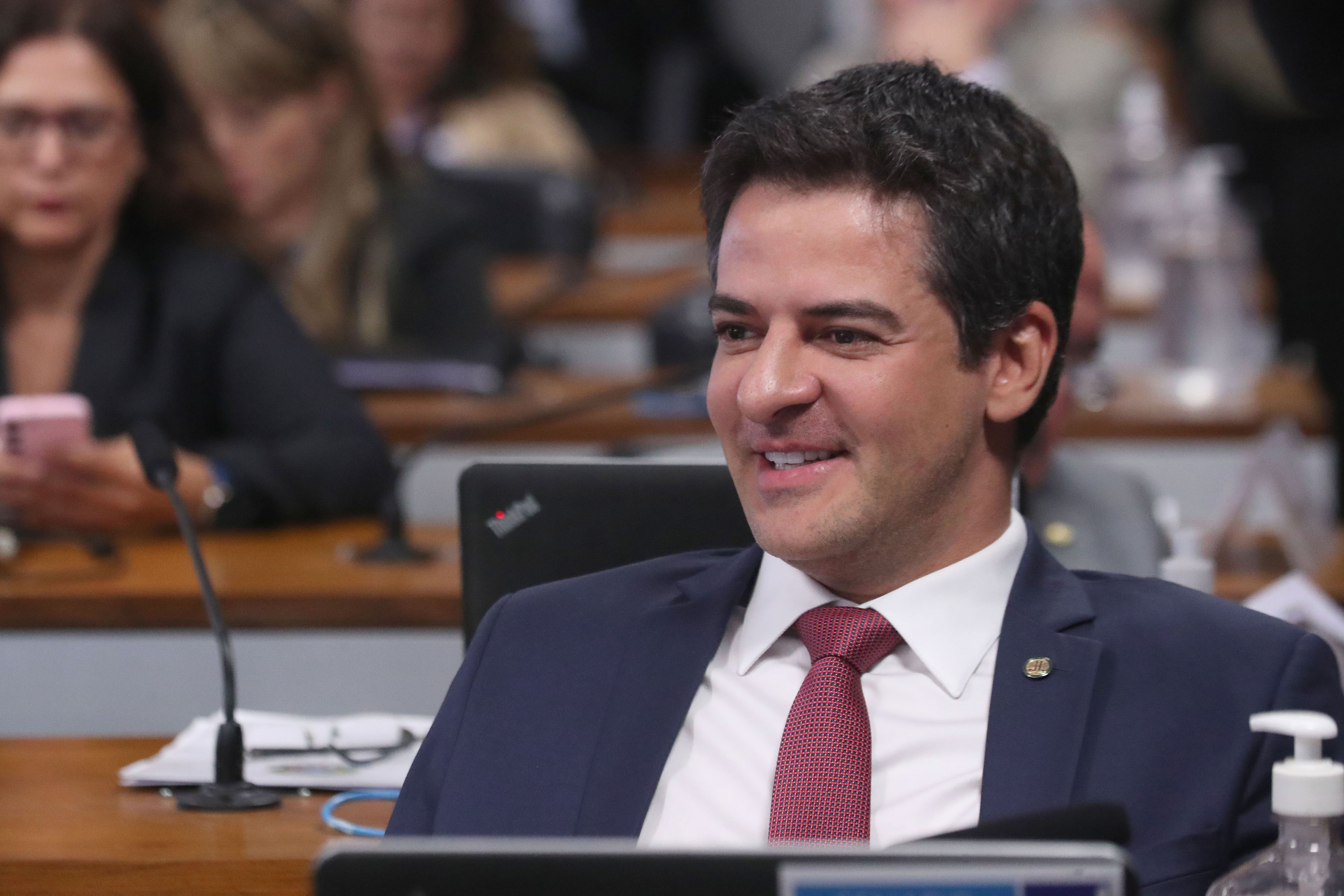
- Alexandrino in 2023

Member of the Chamber of Deputies
- Incumbent
- Assumed office 1 February 2023
- Constituency: Goiás

Personal details
- Born: 26 July 1983 (age 43)
- Party: Social Democratic Party (since 2022)

Ismael Alexandrino Júnior (born 26 July 1983) is a Brazilian politician serving as a member of the Chamber of Deputies since 2023. From 2019 to 2022, he served as secretary of health of Goiás.
