= Zezinho Barbary =

Brazilian politician (born 1964)

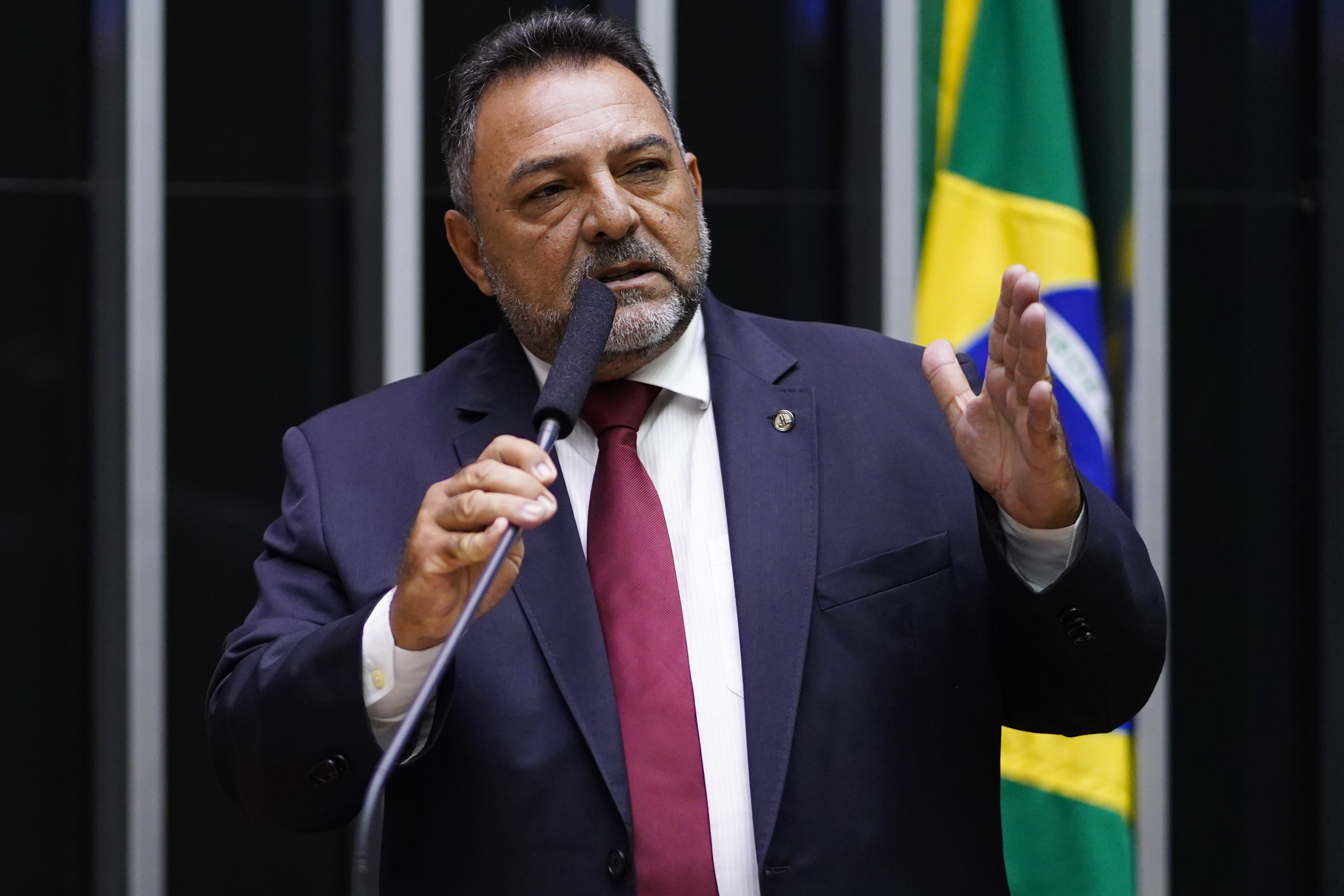
- Zezinho Barbary
- Constituency: Acre

Member of the Chamber of Deputies
- In office 1 February 2023 – present

Mayor of Porto Walter
- In office 1 February 2013 – January 2021

Personal details
- Born: 28 May 1964 (age 62) Porto Walter
- Party: PP (since 2022)
- Other political affiliations: MDB (2012-2022)
- Profession: Trader, Politician

José Estephan Barbary Filho, better known as Zezinho Barbary (born 28 May 1964 in Porto Walter) is a Brazilian politician affiliated with the Progressistas party (PP).

== Political career ==
He was mayor of Porto Walter elected in 2012, being re-elected in 2016.

In the 2022 state elections, he was elected for the Progressistas Party (PP), for the position of federal deputy in the Chamber of Deputies for the 57th legislature (2023–2027) with 19,958 votes
