= Geraldo Mendes =

Brazilian politician (born 1985)

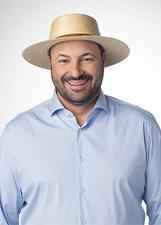
- Mendes in 2024

Member of the Chamber of Deputies
- Incumbent
- Assumed office 1 February 2023
- Constituency: Paraná

Personal details
- Born: 5 December 1985 (age 40)
- Party: Brazil Union (since 2022)

Geraldo Gabriel Mendes (born 5 December 1985) is a Brazilian politician serving as a member of the Chamber of Deputies since 2023. In the 2024 municipal elections, he was a candidate for mayor of São José dos Pinhais.
