= Caio Vianna =

Brazilian politician (born 1988)

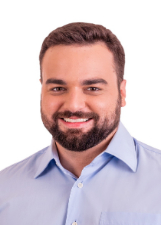
- Vianna in 2020

Member of the Chamber of Deputies
- Incumbent
- Assumed office 12 March 2025
- Constituency: Rio de Janeiro
- In office 23 May 2023 – 1 April 2024
- Constituency: Rio de Janeiro

Personal details
- Born: 8 December 1988 (age 37)
- Party: Social Democratic Party (since 2022)
- Parent: Arnaldo Vianna (father)

Caio Santos Vianna (born 8 December 1988) is a Brazilian politician. He has been a member of the Chamber of Deputies since 2025, having previously served from 2023 to 2024. He is the son of Arnaldo Vianna.
