= Tião Medeiros =

Brazilian politician (born 1983)

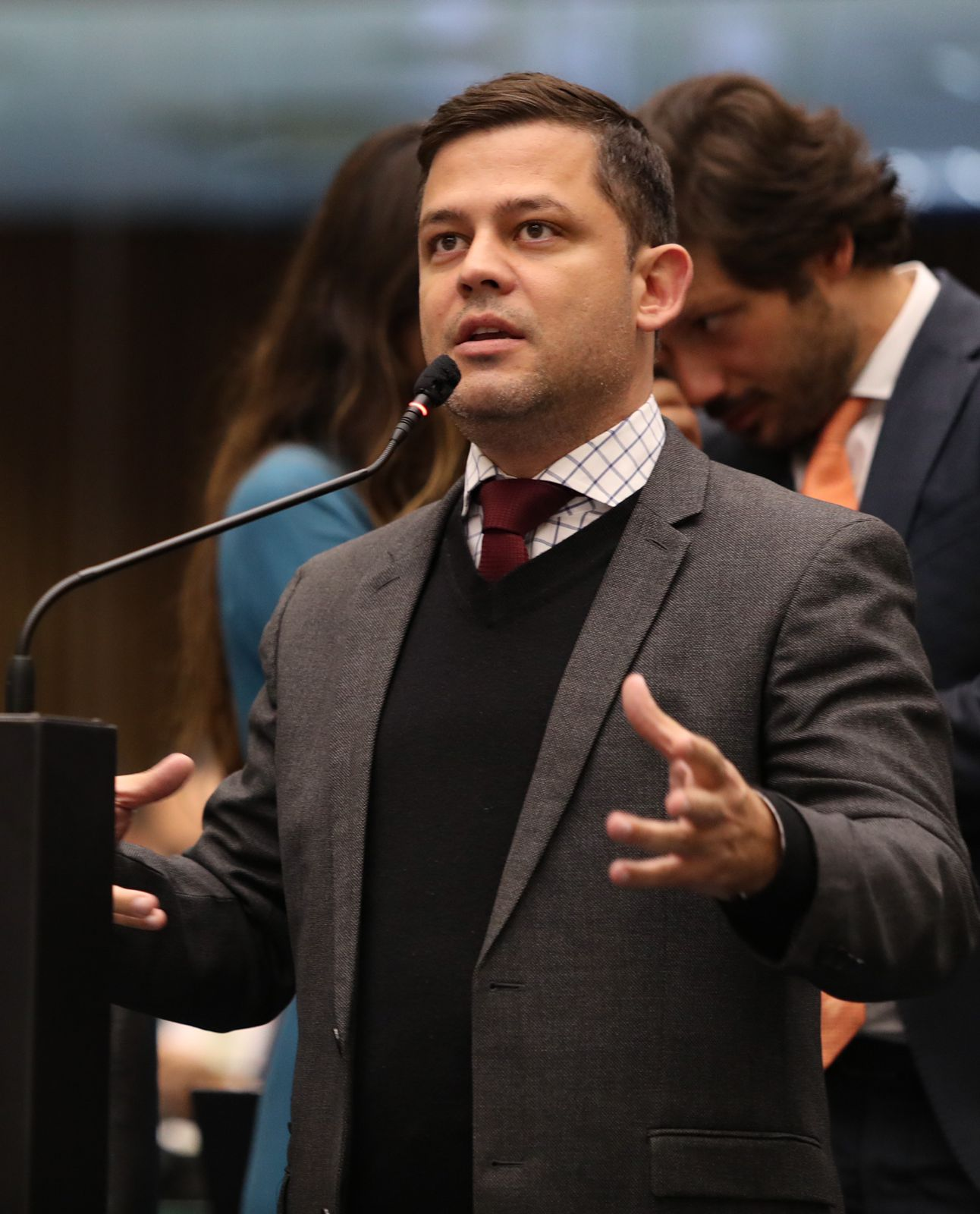
- Medeiros in 2022

Member of the Chamber of Deputies
- Incumbent
- Assumed office 1 February 2023
- Constituency: Paraná

Personal details
- Born: 8 January 1983 (age 43)
- Party: Progressistas (since 2022)

Tião Medeiros (born 8 January 1983) is a Brazilian politician serving as a member of the Chamber of Deputies since 2023. From 2015 to 2022, he was a member of the Legislative Assembly of Paraná.
