= Andreia Siqueira =

Brazilian politician (born 1991)

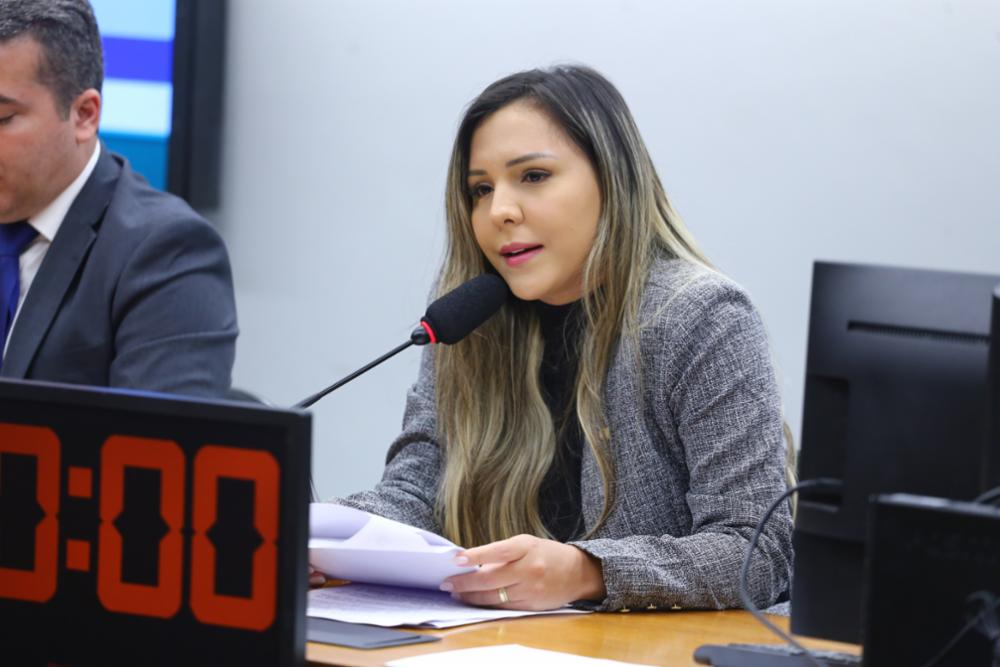
- Siqueira in 2023

Member of the Chamber of Deputies
- Incumbent
- Assumed office 1 February 2023
- Constituency: Pará

Personal details
- Born: 19 August 1991 (age 34)
- Party: Brazilian Democratic Movement (since 2022)

Andreia Brito de Gonçalves Siqueira (born 19 August 1991) is a Brazilian politician serving as a member of the Chamber of Deputies since 2023. From 2021 to 2022, she served as secretary of social welfare of Tucuruí.
