= Sargento Gonçalves =

Brazilian politician (born 1984)

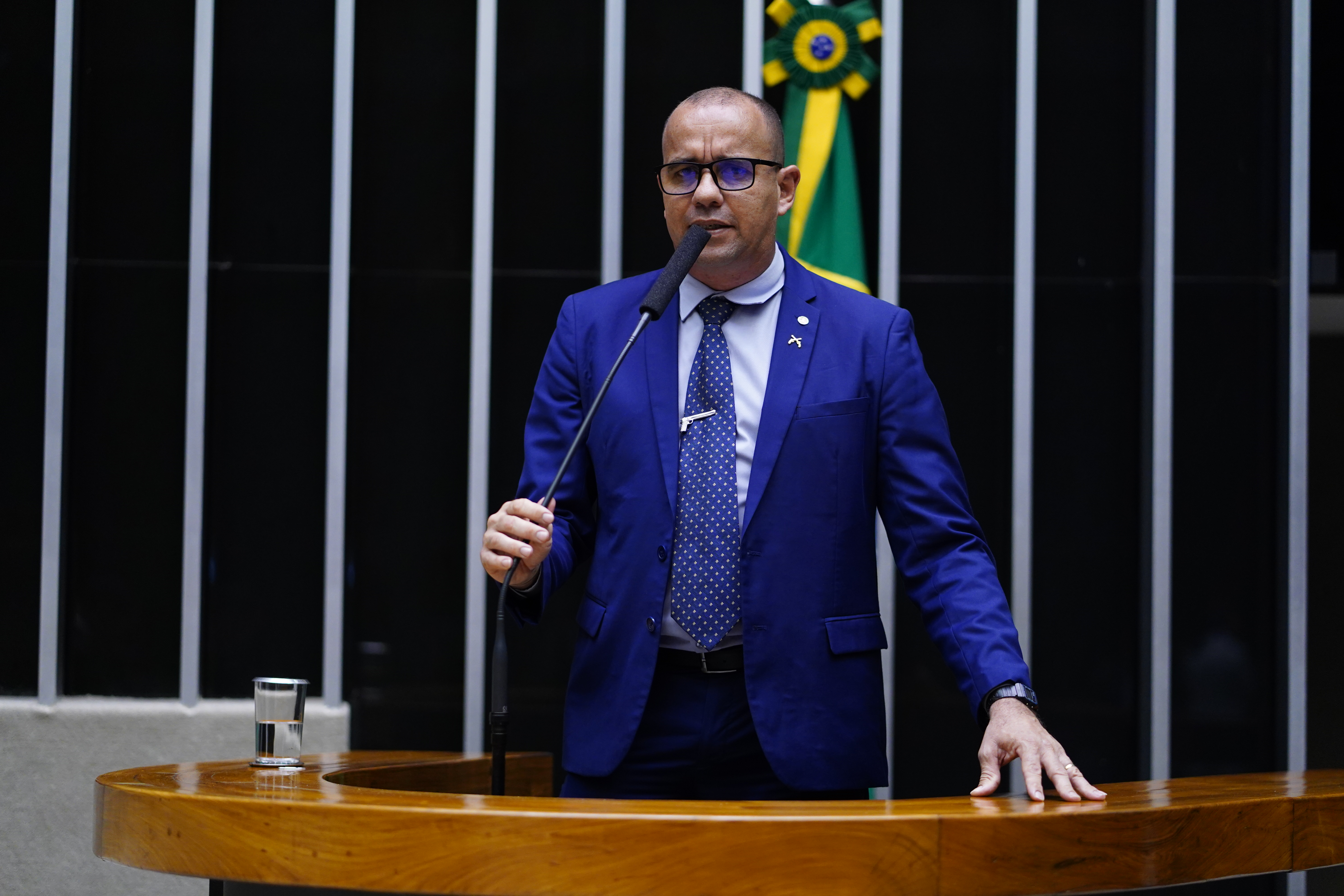
- Gonçalves in 2023

Member of the Chamber of Deputies
- Incumbent
- Assumed office 1 February 2023
- Constituency: Rio Grande do Norte

Personal details
- Born: 27 February 1984 (age 42)
- Party: Liberal Party (since 2022)

Evandro Gonçalves da Silva Júnior (born 27 February 1984), better known as Sargento Gonçalves, is a Brazilian politician serving as a member of the Chamber of Deputies since 2023. He joined the Military Police of Rio Grande do Norte in 2004.
