= Fernando Marangoni =

Brazilian politician (born 1980)

Member of the Chamber of Deputies
- Incumbent
- Assumed office 1 February 2023
- Constituency: São Paulo

Personal details
- Born: 22 January 1980 (age 46)
- Party: Brazil Union (since 2022)

Fernando José de Souza Marangoni (born 22 January 1980) is a Brazilian politician serving as a member of the Chamber of Deputies since 2023. From 2017 to 2018, he served as secretary of housing and land regularization of Santo André.
