= Mirim Doce =

- Municipality
- Flag Coat of arms

- Location in Santa Catarina, Brazil

- Location in Brazil
- Coordinates: 27°11′45″S 50°04′47″W
- Country: Brazil
- Region: South
- State: Santa Catarina
- Mesoregion: Vale do Itajai

Government
  - Mayor: Sergio Luiz Paisan

Area
  - Total: 130.239 sq mi (337.318 km^{2})

Population (2020)
  - Total: 2,283
  - Density: 17.53/sq mi (6.768/km^{2})
- Time zone: UTC -3
- Website: www.mirimdoce.sc.gov.br

Mirim Doce is a municipality in the state of Santa Catarina in the South region of Brazil.

== See also ==
- List of municipalities in Santa Catarina
