= Gisela Simona =

Brazilian politician (born 1977)

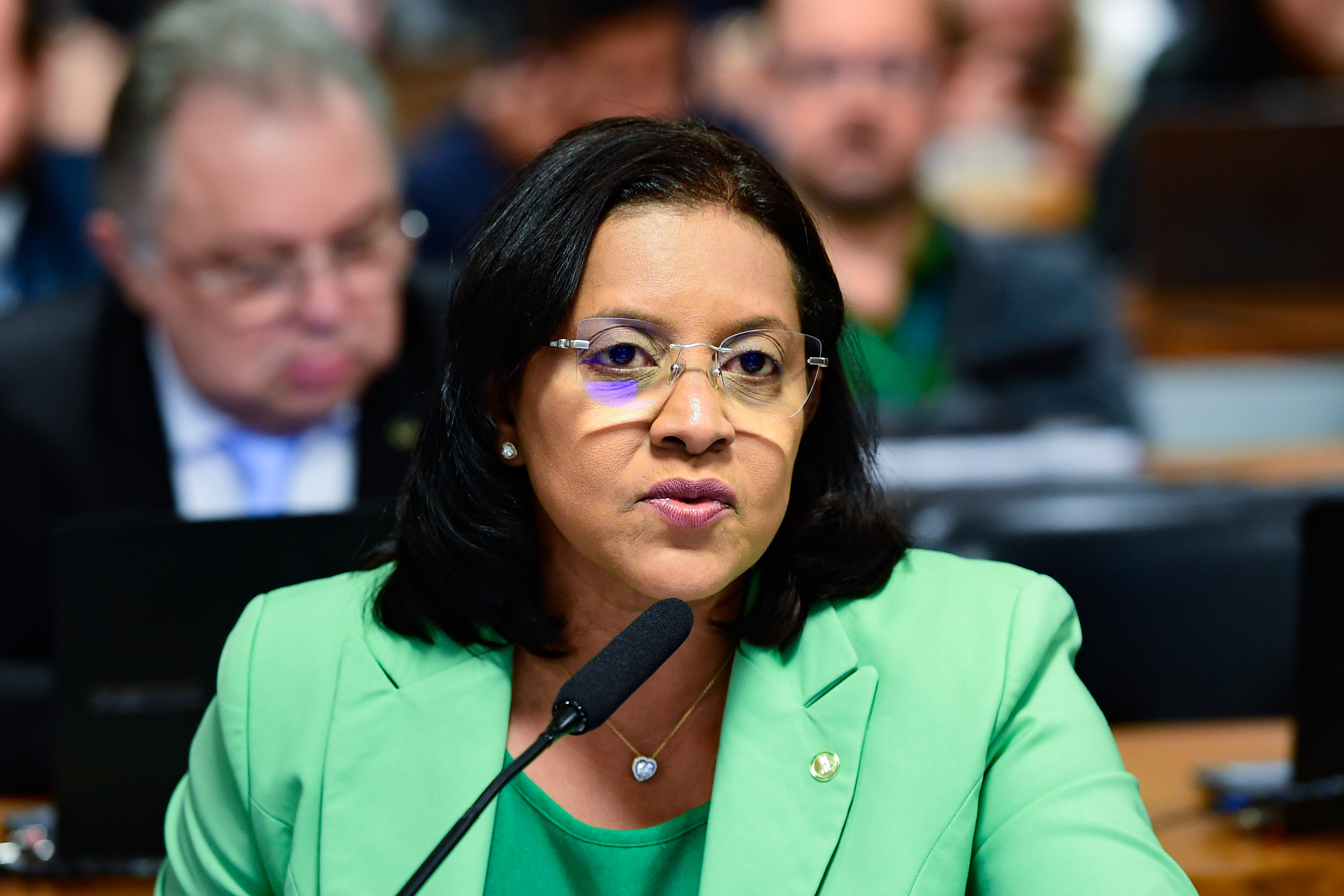
- Simona in 2025

Member of the Chamber of Deputies
- Incumbent
- Assumed office 7 July 2023
- Preceded by: Fábio Garcia
- Constituency: Mato Grosso

Personal details
- Born: 28 April 1977 (age 49)
- Party: Brazil Union (since 2022)

Gisela Simona Viana de Souza (born 28 April 1977) is a Brazilian politician serving as a member of the Chamber of Deputies since 2023. From 2008 to 2017, she served as president of the Consumer Protection and Defense Program of Mato Grosso.
