= Fred Linhares =

Brazilian politician (born 1980)

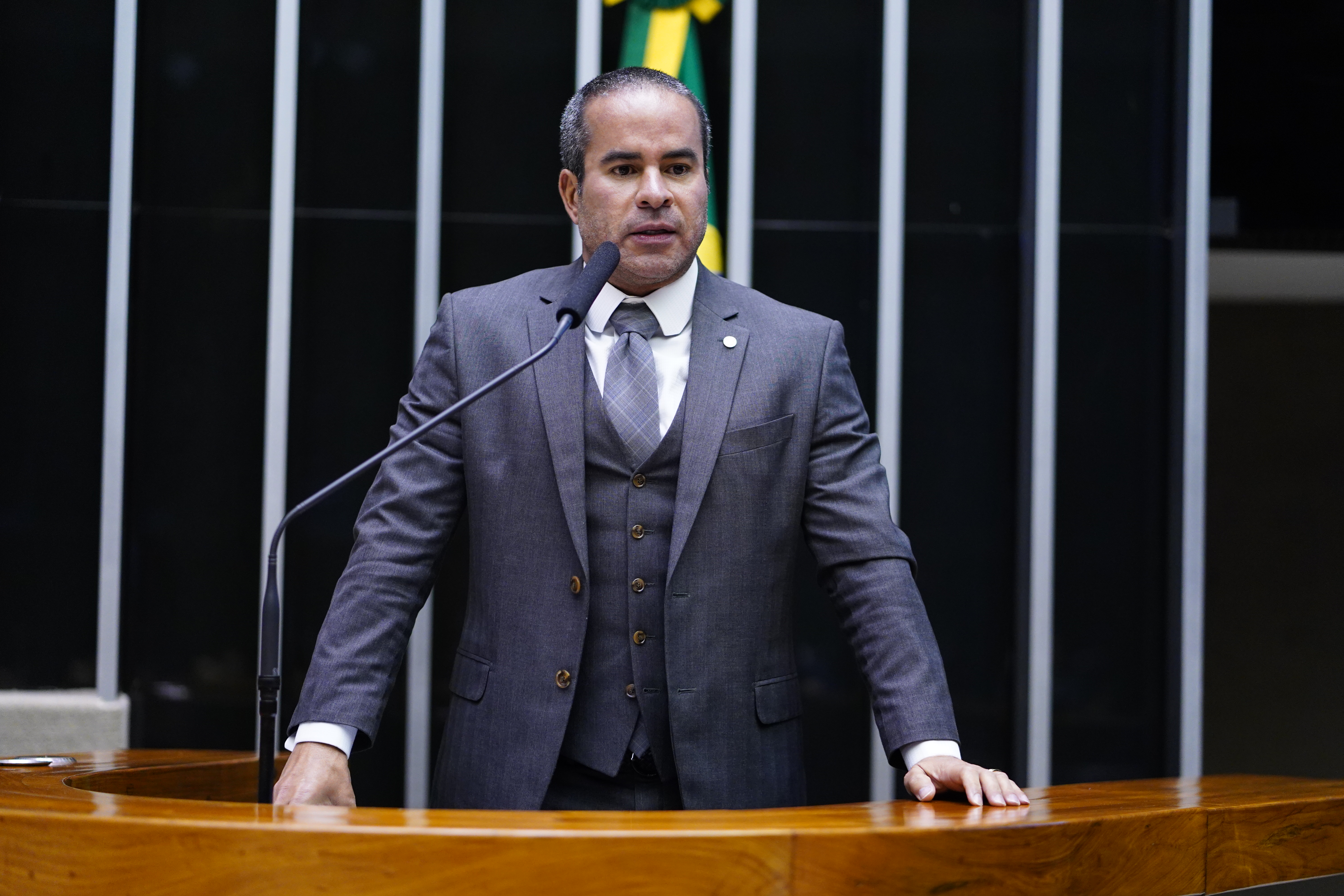
- Linhares in 2023

Member of the Chamber of Deputies
- Incumbent
- Assumed office 1 February 2023
- Constituency: Federal District

Personal details
- Born: 26 January 1980 (age 46)
- Party: Republicans (since 2022)

Davys Frederico Teixeira Linhares (born 26 January 1980) is a Brazilian politician serving as a member of the Chamber of Deputies since 2023. He previously worked as a journalist.
