= Gerlen Diniz =

Brazilian politician (born 1974)

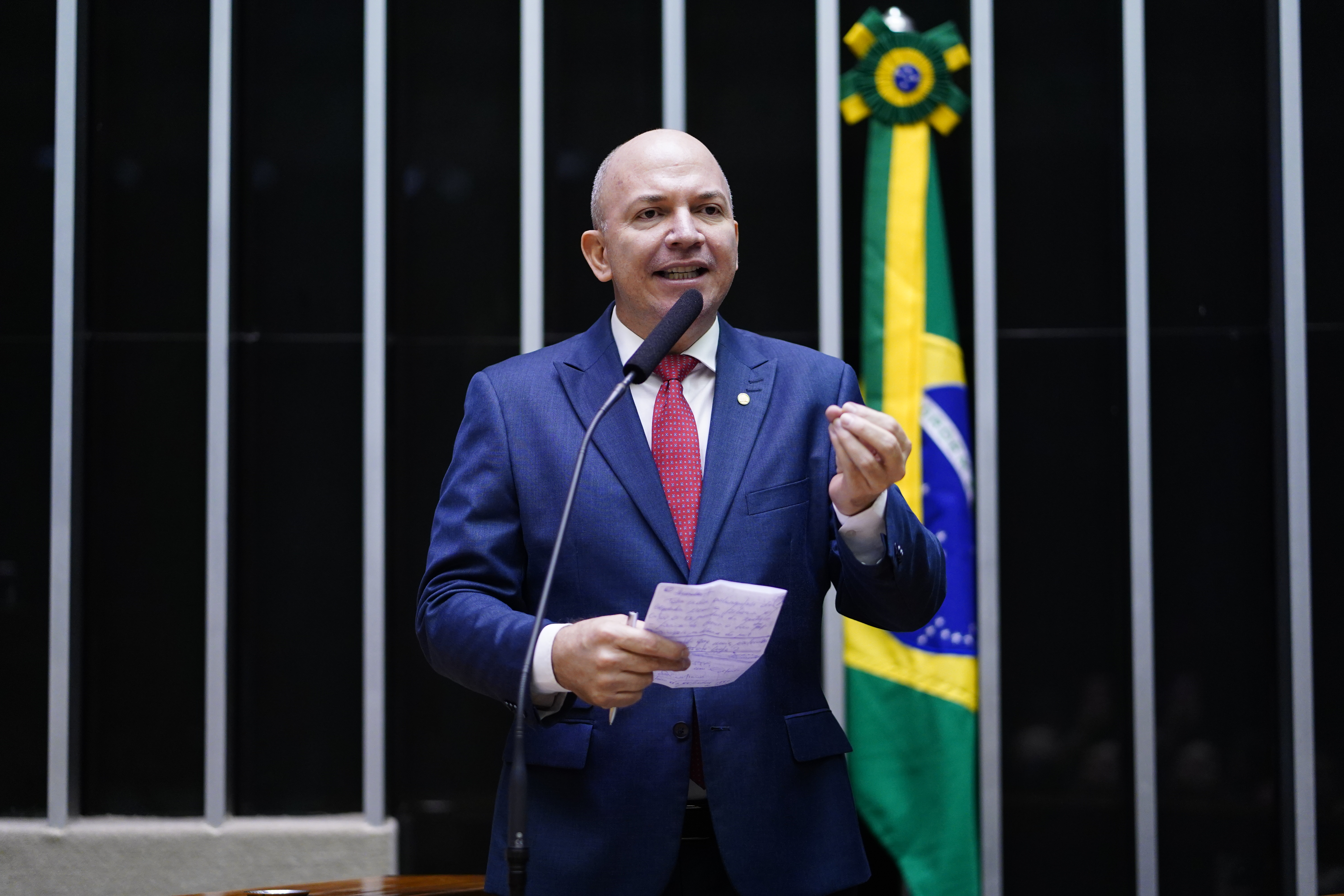
- Diniz in 2023

Mayor of Sena Madureira
- Incumbent
- Assumed office 1 January 2025
- Preceded by: Osmar Serafim

Member of the Chamber of Deputies
- In office 1 February 2023 – 1 January 2025
- Succeeded by: Zé Adriano
- Constituency: Acre

Personal details
- Born: 8 April 1974 (age 52)
- Party: Progressistas

Gehlen Diniz Andrade (born 8 April 1974), better known as Gerlen Diniz, is a Brazilian politician serving as mayor of Sena Madureira since 2025. From 2023 to 2025, he was a member of the Chamber of Deputies.
