= Fernando Máximo =

Brazilian politician (born 1979)

Member of the Chamber of Deputies
- Incumbent
- Assumed office 1 February 2023
- Constituency: Rondônia

Personal details
- Born: 4 October 1979 (age 47)
- Party: PL
- Other political affiliations: Brazil Union

Fernando Rodrigues Máximo (born 4 October 1979) is a Brazilian medical doctor, politician, and professor serving as a member of the Chamber of Deputies since 2023. From 2019 to 2022, he served as secretary of health of Rondônia.
