= 2021 Brazilian protests =

Demonstrations in the context of the COVID-19 pandemic

- Part of the protests over responses to the COVID-19 pandemic
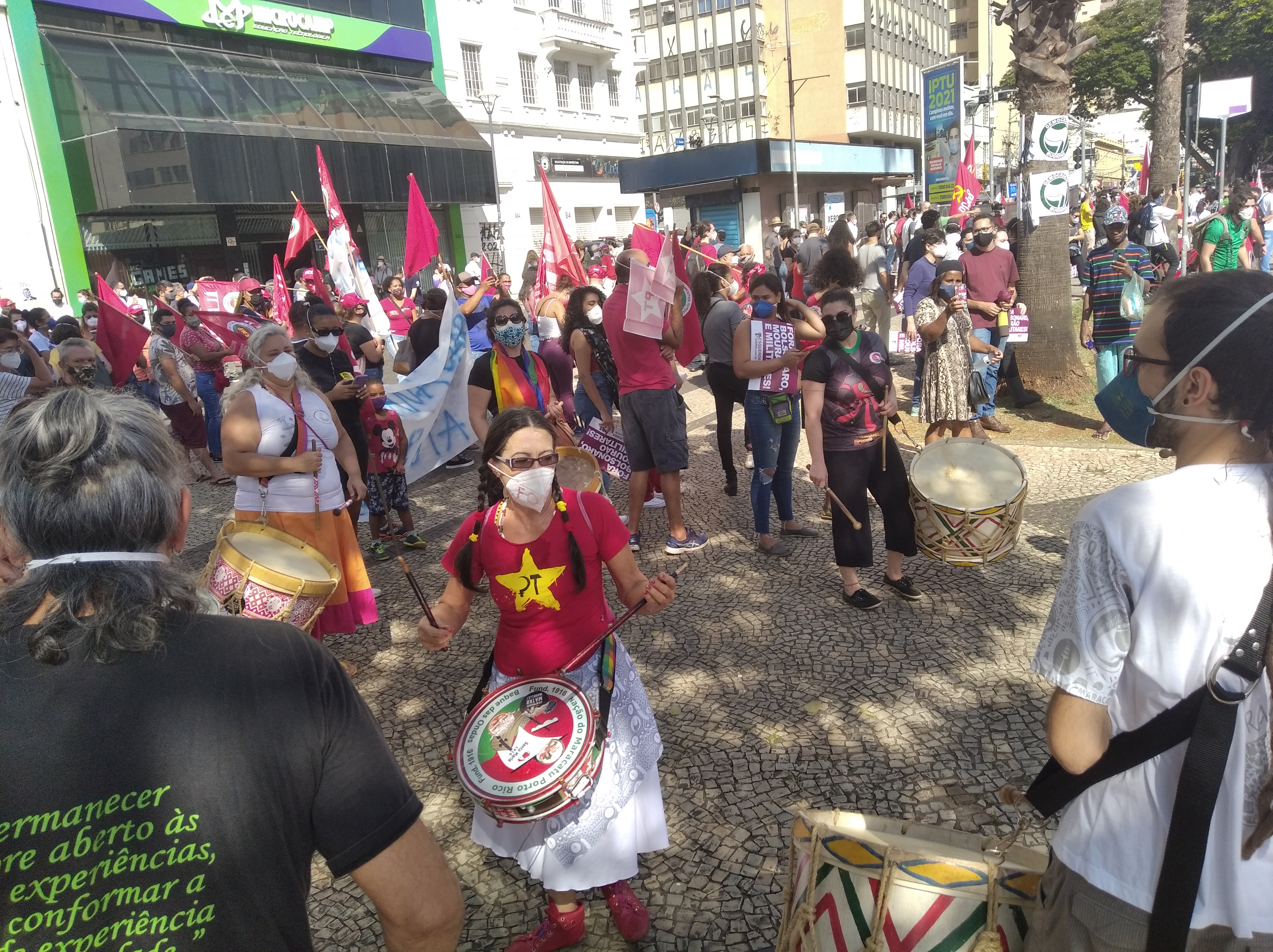
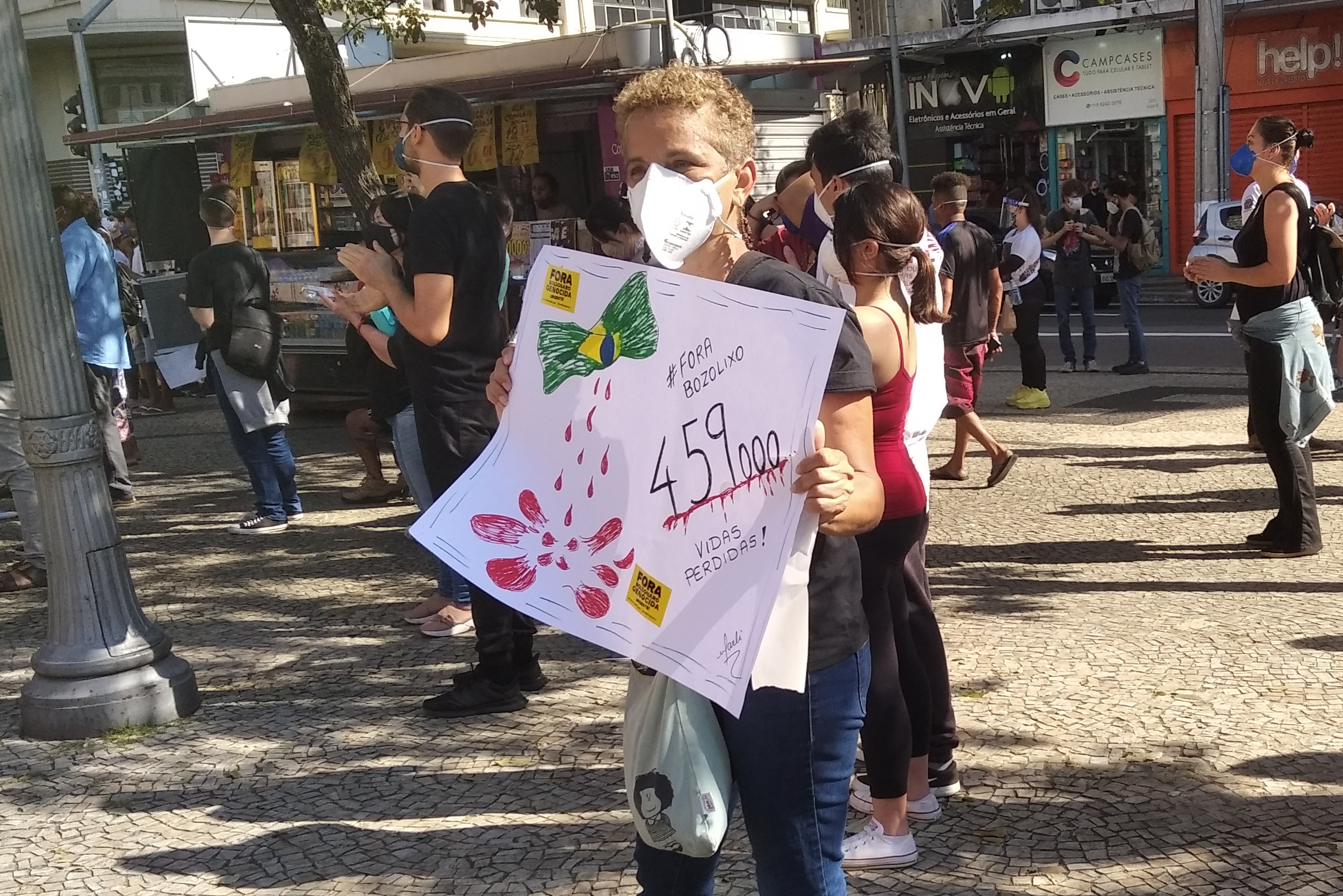
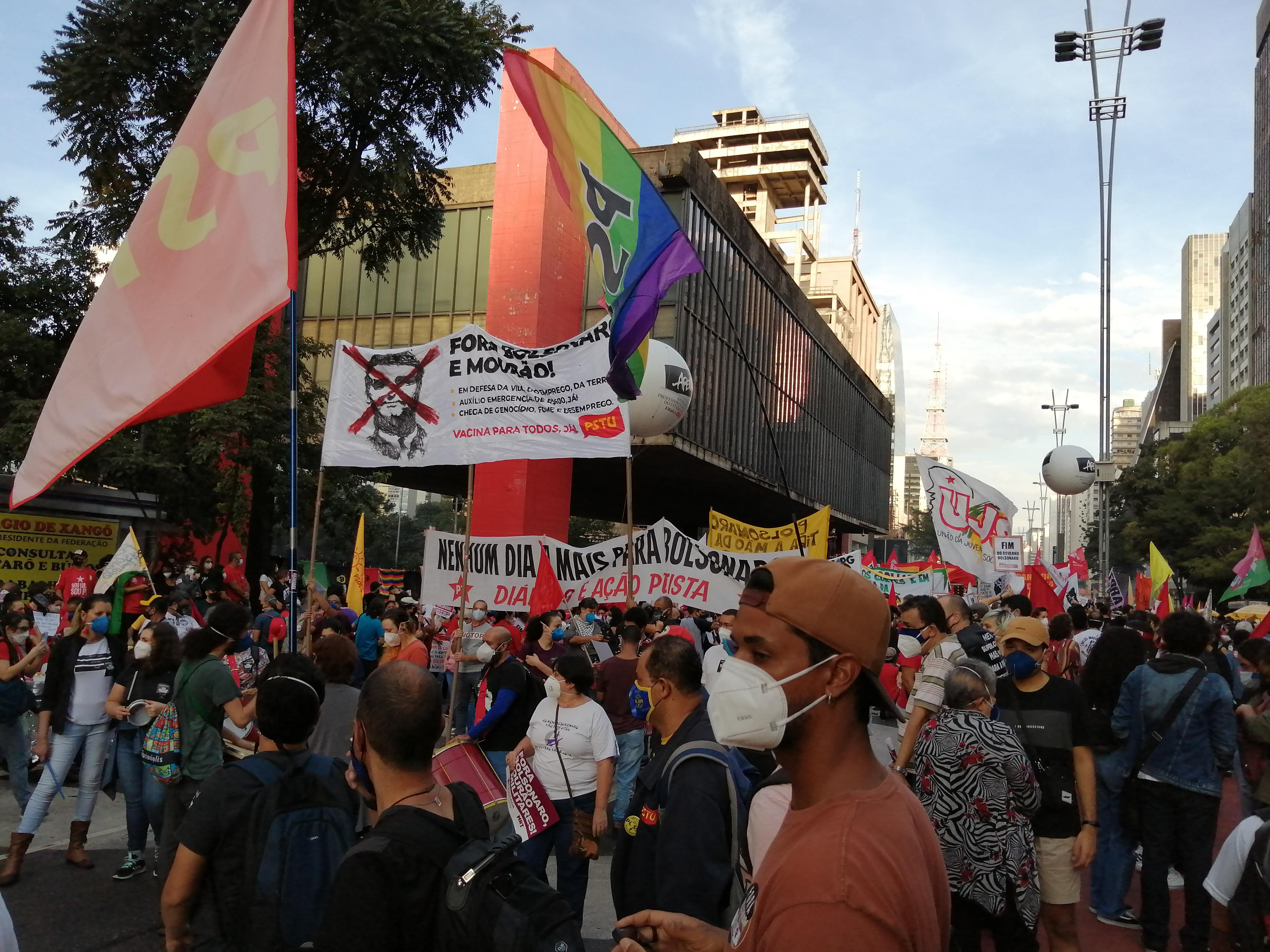
- Top to Botton: Car with a sign asking Bolsonaro to leave during the motorcade on January 15th. Anti-government protests and demonstration in Belo Horizonte, Campinas and São Paulo on May 29th.
- Date: 15 January 2021 – 31 December 2021 (11 months, 2 weeks and 2 days)
- Location: Brazil – 26 states and the federal district, with solidarity protests worldwide
- Caused by: Mishandling of the COVID-19 pandemic in Brazil by the federal government; Dissatisfaction with the Bolsonaro government; Opposition to the government's Privatization of public companies and administrative reforms (factions); Economic decline and crisis caused by the COVID-19 pandemic; Budget cuts for education; Corruption; Economic and social inequality; Increase of unemployment, hunger and poverty; High Cost of living; Inflation and increase in the price of commodities (such as food, kitchen gas and fuel); Police brutality, violence and repression
- Goals: Resignation or impeachment of the president and its ministers; Guarantee of general elections in 2022 (keeping electronic votes); Investigations into government corruption; Stabilization of the economy; Return of the emergency aid (with an approximated value of R$600.00); More funding for education and healthcare; Decrease to inequality, poverty, hunger, inflation and unemployment; End to privatizations and administrative reforms (factions); Better handling of the COVID-19 pandemic by the federal government; Demarcation of indigenous lands and protection of the Amazon rainforest; End to police brutality and repression
- Methods: Protest: motorcades, picketing, demonstrations, strike action, civil resistance, civil disobedience, direct action and internet activism; Civil disorder: street blockades, barricades, riots, vandalism, arson and looting.
- Result: Failed impeachment proceedings against Jair Bolsonaro; Gradual decrease of food, gas and fuel prices; Departure of Eduardo Pazuello from the Ministry of Health; Return of the emergency aid (but with values below R$600,00); STF's minister Luís Roberto Barroso forces Senate to create commission to investigate federal and local governments' handling of the pandemic

Parties
(Brazil) Opposition: Indigenous, LGBT, black/antiracist and antifascist activists; Student, police and worker's unions; National Union of Students; Unified Workers' Central; Left-wing movements; Homeless Workers' Movement; Landless Workers' Movement; Centre of People's Movements; Right-wing movements; Free Brazil Movement; Movement Come to the Streets; Free; Football clubs; Supported by: Workers' Party; Brazilian Communist Party; United Socialist Workers' Party; Sustainability Network; Socialism and Liberty Party; Communist Party of Brazil; Democratic Labour Party; Workers' Cause Party; Green Party; Popular Unity; Solidarity; Brazilian Socialist Party; Brazilian Democratic Movement; Social Democratic Party; Forward; Brazilian Social Democracy Party; Citizenship; New Party; We Can; Brazil Union; Democrats (formerly); Social Liberal Party (formerly); Liberal Party (factions); Patriot (factions)	Government of Brazil: Military Police; Riot police; Pro-government counter-protesters

Lead figures
Non-Centralized leadership. Some notable people participating: Fernando Haddad; Manuela d'Ávila; Ciro Gomes; Tabata Amaral; Randolfe Rodrigues; Guilherme Boulos; João Amoêdo; Simone Tebet; Alessandro Vieira; João Doria; Joice Hasselmann; Luiz Henrique Mandetta; Arthur do Val	Government: Jair Bolsonaro (Commander-in-chief); Hamilton Mourão; Eduardo Pazuello; Marcelo Queiroga Pro-Government groups: Ricardo Salles; Bia Kicis; Carla Zambelli; Eduardo Bolsonaro

Number
May 29, 2021: 420,000 June 19, 2021: 750,000 July 3, 2021: 800,000 July 24, 2021: 600,000 September 12, 2021: 6,000 (in São Paulo) October 2, 2021: 700,000: 8,000 (according to the military police) to 100,000 (according to the organizers) on the Paulista Avenue	7 September 2021: In Brasília: 400 000 (military police (extraoficial); In São Paulo: 125 000 (military police)

Casualties
- Injuries: 5
- Arrested: 49

The 2021 Brazilian protests were popular demonstrations that took place in different regions of Brazil in the context of the COVID-19 pandemic. Protests both supporting and opposing the government happened.

It was also the first time in the country when sectors linked to two antagonistic sides (the left and the right) began to protest over a common goal, with right-wing movements organizing demonstrations on January and joint protests with the left through June, September and October.

== Background ==
=== Bolsonaro's claims and speeches ===
On 5 January 2021, President of the Republic Jair Bolsonaro, meeting with supporters, reportedly affirmed that "the country is broken" and "I can't do anything about it". He also attacked the press, affirming that it "gave power to the [corona]virus". There were many journalists talking about it the next day, and Bolsonaro said, in a tone of irony, that "the country is well, its a marvel", and that "the press made a terrible wave" of his affirmation, with Bolsonaro's opposition later claimed that he was "playing with the country".

In a speech on 28 August 2021, President of Brazil Jair Bolsonaro said that he "only had three alternatives for [his] future: to be arrested, to be killed, or to win".

=== Health crisis in the state of Amazonas ===
On January, the State of Amazonas underwent a health crisis due to a shortage of oxygen supplies and with hospitals filled to capacity. On 18 January, the Attorney General of the Union (AGU) told the Federal Supreme Court that the government knew about the possibility of the oxygen crisis in the state, and that one of the measures by the Union was delivering to the state 120,000 tablets of hydroxychloroquine, a drug with disputed efficacy for COVID-19. Even with the start of vaccination against COVID-19 on 18 January, the president again insisted on early treatment. The AGU also said, however, that the Health Ministry only knew about the oxygen depletion on 8 January.

=== Corruption Allegations ===
==== 'Covaxingate': allegations of overpricing at Covaxin's contract ====
On 23 June, Federal Deputy Luis Miranda (DEM-DF) denounced a corruption scandal involving Covaxin's buy contract by Bolsonaro's government, in a live national transmission of CNN Brasil. He affirmed that he got the information with his brother, Ricardo. The same day, a press conference at the Planalto Palace was organized, aired live by TV Brasil, where the Federal Government confronted Miranda's claims, and Bolsonaro affirms that it was all a typo. The scandal was named "Covaxingate" by some press corporations. Precisa Medicamentos' owner (the company that intermediated Covaxin's contract), Francisco Emerson Maximiano, sent to the COVID-19 CPI a letter that, according to CNN Brasil itself, "denied the brothers' allegations", while Bharat Biotech said Brazil bought Covaxin by the same price as other countries with better purchasing conditions, denying any overpricing.

==== AstraZeneca bribery scandal ====
On 29 June, the Brazilian journal Folha de S.Paulo published an interview with Luiz Paulo Dominguetti Pereira, a Davati Medical Supply's representative. Luiz Pereira said that, on 25 February, he met with Roberto Ferreira Dias, Logistics Director at the Health Ministry, in Brasília Shopping, to negotiate 400 million doses of the Oxford–AstraZeneca COVID-19 vaccine. According to VEJA's reporting on the interview, "To make up such 'group', said the representative of Davati Supply, the representative of the Ministry of Health would have stated that it would be necessary to "add 1 dollar" per dose of vaccine, for bribes. [...] He claims that he refused the request for a bribe. After the case, he would have had contact with the representative of the Ministry of Health on other occasions, but the agreement did not go forward". However, Davati said Dominguetti Pereira is neither a company's representative nor an employee, and AstraZeneca denied having any intermediaries in Brazil, or negotiating with the private market, state governments and municipalities.

=== Economic crisis ===
Since 2014, Brazil has been in an economic crisis, caused mainly by a political crisis that culminated in the impeachment of then-President Dilma Rousseff, but also by the 2014 commodity price shock, which had a negative impact on exports. The COVID-19 pandemic and lockdowns exacerbated the situation: the GDP of Brazil decreased by 4.1% in 2020, while 18 million fell into poverty, making poverty triple in one year. Unemployment reached 36.6 million. In a period of 15 days during the pandemic, 522,000 businesses went bankrupt.

=== Supreme Federal Court (STF) inquiries and rulings ===
==== The Fake News Inquiry ====
On 14 March 2019, the then-Supreme Federal Court president, Minister Dias Toffoli, opened an inquiry (Inquiry n. 4781) to investigate fake news against the Court's members, indicating Minister Alexandre de Moraes as rapporteur. The inquiry was labeled 'inquisitorial', 'unconstitutional' and 'illegal'. The Prosecutor General of the Republic (PGR) asked the STF, in May 2020, to archive the case, but this did not happen.

On 16 February 2021, Moraes arrested Federal Deputy Daniel Silveira, for unbailable crime, based on the Fake News inquiry, after he criticized the STF, decision unanimously confirmed by the Court and later approved by the Chamber of Deputies, although with high opposition from pro-government parties and politicians.

===== Crusoé's article about Toffoli removed =====
On 12 April 2019 (effective 15 April), Moraes censored Revista Crusoé's article about Dias Toffoli, based on documents obtained by Operation Car Wash, where, on 13 July 2007, Marcelo Odebrecht asked to Adriano Maia and Irineu Meireles, via message, if they reached an agreement about Madeira River's hydroelectric plants with "the friend of my father's friend". The Operation asked to Odebrecht about these messages, and Odebrecht answered:

It refers to discussions that Adriano Maia had with the AGU on issues involving the hydroelectric dams of the Madeira River. 'Friend of my father's friend' refers to José Antônio Dias Toffoli. The nature and content of these discussions, however, can only be properly clarified by Adriano Maia, who led them.

Moraes, the next day after the reporting was published, censored the reporting, affirming that there was a "clear abuse at the content of the reporting". The decision was widely criticized by the Brazilian press, being labeled by it unconstitutional, and by the Order of Attorneys of Brazil, and the censorship heated discussions about the creation of a Parliamentary Commission of Inquiry to investigate the Superior Tribunals (STF, Superior Tribunal of Justice - STJ, Superior Military Tribunal - STM, Superior Electoral Court - TSE and Superior Labor Court - TST), often called the "Lava Toga CPI". Even STF ministers, such as Marco Aurélio Mello and Celso de Mello, criticized Moraes' decision. Moraes later revoked his order.

==== Lula's release from prison ====
On 7 November 2019, the STF, by 6 votes against 5, vetoed second instance arrest, affirming that someone may only be arrested after the res judicata. The decision paved the way to former president Luiz Inácio Lula da Silva be free, and 5,000 others. STF's critics claimed the Court "finished with second instance arrest". The day after, Lula was released. At that time, a Real Time Institute research affirmed that 50% of the Brazilians disagreed with Lula's release, and 56% disagreed with the Court's decision.

On 8 March 2021, Minister Edson Fachin nullified Lula's sentences on Operetion Car Wash, decision soon criticized by many deputies. The decision would be later confirmed by the STF plenary, in an 8x3 vote, defeated Ministers Nunes Marques, Marco Aurélio Mello and the Court's president, Luiz Fux. According to a Paraná Pesquisas search, 57.5% of the Brazilians disagreed with the decision. In parallel, on 23 March, the 2nd Class of the STF formed a majority to declare then-Judge Sérgio Moro biased when judging Lula, after Lula-appointed Minister Cármen Lúcia reverted her vote, reverting the class' 3x2 majority against Lula to a 3x2 majority in favor of Lula. The decision was later confirmed by the Court, forming a majority on 22 April in Lula's favor. The plenary's judgment, however, was suspended, after Minister Marco Aurélio Mello asked more time to make an analysis. Minister President Luiz Fux, then, suspended rapidly the judgment, because Ministers Luís Roberto Barroso and Gilmar Mendes started a discussion. At that time, the vote was 7x2 in Lula's favor. The judgement ended on 23 June, after the votes of Marco Aurélio and Luiz Fux, both voting against, leading to a 7x4 vote in Lula's favor. At that time, Marco Aurélio said that Lula "was politically resurrected" by the Supreme Federal Court.

==== Criticism ====
As a result, the Court was widely criticized. Critics often said that the Supreme Federal Court was "tearing the Constitution" or acting like it was the Constitution's owner, as described in a Gazeta do Povo editorial:

If politicians activate the Supreme Court so that ministers "draw" what they know is explicit in the Magna Carta, and if the ministers agree with pleasure in doing so, it is only because they feel they own the Constitution, hovering above it instead of judging themselves subject to the Greater Law.

The Court was also labeled a "shame, a "court of exception", "perfidious", reason for "juridical insecurity", a defender for impunity, partial, de facto legislator and censorior, interferer into the other powers, "apequenated" and a threat to democracy. According to a PoderData search, 42% of Brazilians disapprove the Court's work.

=== Impeachment calls ===
In the midst of the political crisis, a profile called @sos_impeachment appeared on Twitter, with the objective of taking a voting score through positions. Until 25 January 2021, there were 111 votes in favor and 76 against the impeachment of Bolsonaro. Taking advantage of the engagement, the Movimento Vem pra Rua, the Movimento Brasil Livre and the former candidate for president of the Republic for the Partido Novo, João Amoêdo, launched on 21 January a petition for Bolsonaro's impeachment. As of 25 January, there have already been over 200 thousand subscriptions on the change.org platform. During the months of April and May, the movements against Bolsonaro and for the Impeachment regained strength, starting to have pressure even from artists and digital influencers. Among the people who signed a collective request published on 24 May 2021, are former RecordTV presenter Xuxa Meneghel, sports commentator Walter Casagrande, the YouTuber and main government opponent Felipe Neto, the priest Júlio Lancelotti and the actress Júlia Lemmertz. In addition to famous people, doctors and scientists also signed the letter. The requests also started to use the context of pro-government movements with threats of military or federal intervention to counter the restriction measures used by mayors and governors during the critical period of the Pandemic, including pro-government demonstrations held on 15 May in Brasília as part of the movement entitled March of the Christian Family for Freedom and on 23 May in Rio de Janeiro, with the presence of the former Minister of Health, Eduardo Pazuello, including one of the targets of the COVID-19 CPI and until then hadn't had given testimony.

==== "Super request" for impeachment ====
On 30 June, politicians of the left and of the right presented a "super request" for Bolsonaro's impeachment, in an event that included former government supporters Joice Hasselman and Kim Kataguiri, along with other opposition deputies. The "super request" was a compilation of over 120 other requests, and appointed 23 supposed responsibility crimes committed by Bolsonaro. Pro-government deputies criticized the proposal. Federal Deputy Carlos Jordy, for example, said that the request

Is unfounded, doesn't have a single responsibility crime. And they seized on several issues that are raised by the extreme press, by a large part of the press, by the opposition, talking about alleged cases of corruption that there wasn't even an investigation to prove them.

However, hours after the request was presented, Chamber of Deputies' President, Arthur Lira, rejected the proposal, affirming that "Impeachment, as a political action, we do not do it with discourse, we do it with materiality, which has not yet been proven". He also, ironically, criticized the COVID-19 CPI, affirming that it is "doing a great, really impartial, job".

=== Predictions of violence and fears of escalation ===
Some countries were concerned about the possibility of a clash between two political sides in the demonstrations on the seventh. The United States, through its embassy in Brazil, requested Americans on Brazilian soil to avoid leaving their homes on 7 September and that, should it be necessary to leave their homes, US citizens would avoid certain places that would be possible meeting points for protesters from both sides such as the Avenida Paulista in São Paulo, Copacabana beach in Rio de Janeiro, Orla da Barra in Salvador and Farroupilha Park in Porto Alegre. These places are used by the opposition and government leaders for their protests on different days, which can cause complications if there is a meeting between the groups. The embassy also recommended the use of "discreet" clothing and the use of an emergency application created by the United States for US citizens living abroad, thus allowing monitoring and assistance to the Americans if necessary in a possible conflict. The North American recommendation frightened other countries about the threat of civil conflicts on the day of the demonstration.

In some speeches and invitations to the 7 September demonstrations, protesters promised to "expel China from the national territory" and "take the Supreme Federal Court". After speeches, and several arrests to avoid threats to democracy, the Federal Supreme Court (STF) ordered the security of the headquarters to be reinforced on the day of the demonstration.

Regarding the Chinese embassy in Brasília, the risk of a possible invasion was pointed out, based on "publications made by the digital militias of President Jair Bolsonaro". The Military Police of the Federal District, at the request of the embassy, reinforced police protection and took measures to control access. Before the protest, several attacks were carried out on Yang Wanming, ambassador of China.

== Movement ==
=== Anti-government ===
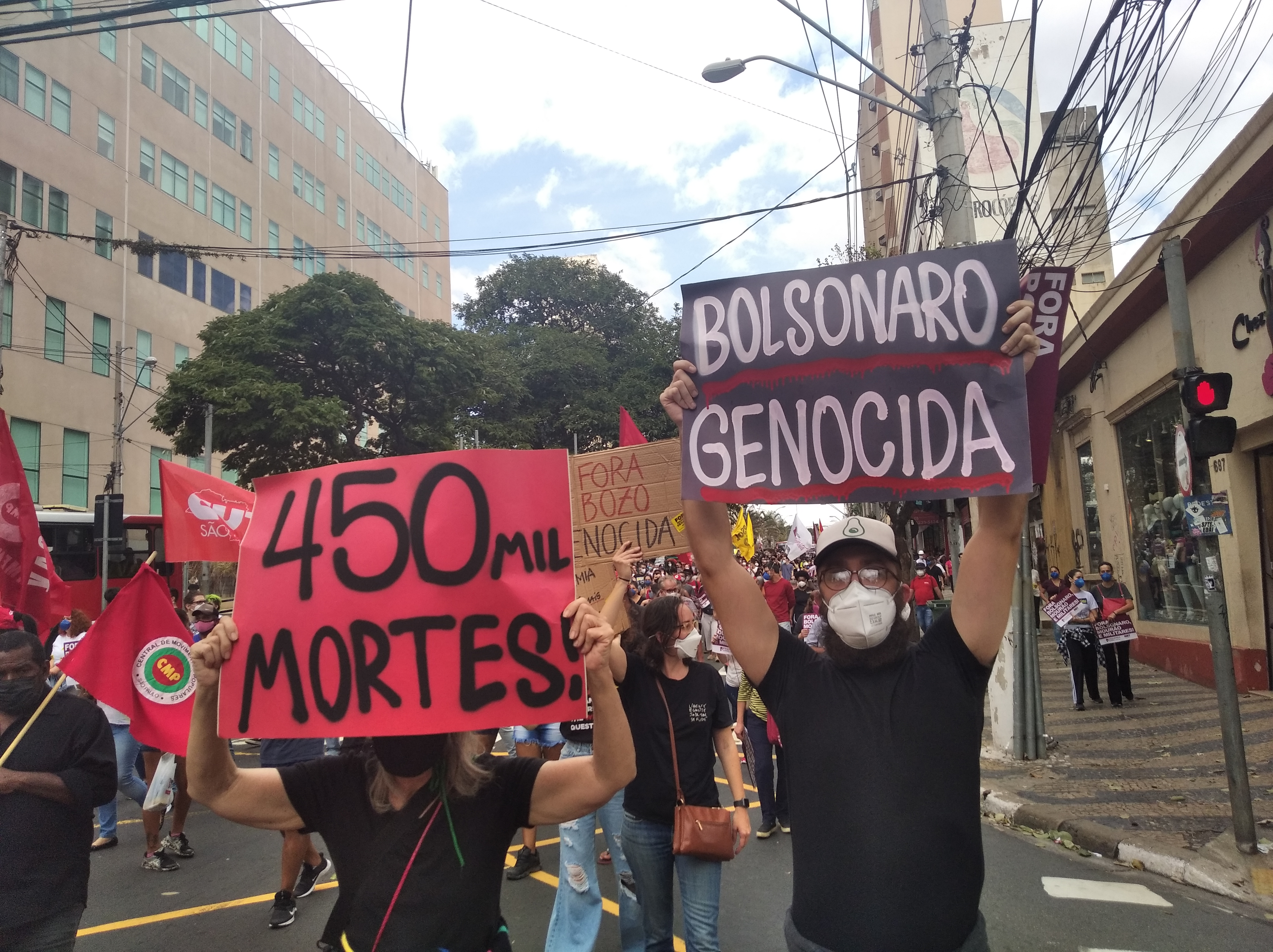
Protest against the government of President Jair Bolsonaro in Campinas on 29 May 2021

==== January ====
Row of cars in Brasília with political party flags during the demonstration

Car with a sign written "Vidas Brasileiras importam" in handwriting, accompanied by a cartoon.

On 15 January, the first cacerolazo against the government took place in the cities of São Paulo, Rio de Janeiro, Belo Horizonte, Brasília, Goiânia, Salvador, Florianópolis, São José dos Campos, Belém, Recife and Porto Alegre. The acts began at 8:30 pm after a call on social networks using the slogan "No oxygen, no vaccine, no government", having the support of several political and social movements, as well as celebrities such as presenter Luciano Huck.

Several Brazilian cities registered motorcades, bike rides, caravans and "horncades" (similar to motorcades, but done by car) against the government on 23 January, being organized by opposition sectors such as the National Union of Students of São Paulo (UEE-SP), Centre of People's Movements (CMP), Popular Brazil Front (led mainly by the Workers' Party) and the People Without Fear Front (led mainly by groups such as the Unified Workers' Central, the Central of the Workers of Brazil, the Brazilian Union of Secundarist Students, the Landless Workers' Movement and the Homeless Workers' Movement), in addition to having the presence of sympathizers of political parties such as the United Socialist Workers' Party (PSTU), Citizenship, Democratic Labour Party (PDT), Sustainability Network (REDE), Brazilian Communist Party (PCB), Communist Party of Brazil (PCdoB), Socialism and Liberty Party (PSOL), Green Party (PV), Brazilian Socialist Party (PSB) and Popular Unity (UP). In addition to shouts and signs written "Fora Bolsonaro" (Bolsonaro Out), the presence of Brazilian flags and banners of social and political movements (and others such as LGBT+) in some homes were also recorded. In all, 21 Brazilian capitals and the Federal District reported acts against the government.

Organized by the right-wing groups Free Brazil Movement and Movement Come to the Streets, acts were registered in some Brazilian cities against the government on 24 January, also through caravans, motorcades and cycling tours. In several vehicles, there were posters asking for the departure of the president and the minister of health, in addition to the phrase "Brazilian Lives Matter" and various ironies regarding the use of chloroquine, protesters also quoted phrases said by Bolsonaro and his children Flávio Bolsonaro, Carlos Bolsonaro and Eduardo Bolsonaro during meetings. In front of the Paulo Machado de Carvalho Municipal Stadium, a green and yellow banner with the phrase "Impeachment Já!" (Impeachment Now!) written on it was extended, the same one used in the Protests against the Dilma Rousseff government.

On 31 January, New acts were registered in at least 56 Brazilian cities against the government, being organized by social and political movements. In Brasília, participants wore plastic bags on their faces to show suffocation, as a response to the oxygen crisis in Amazonas, in addition to participants consuming condensed milk, after the disclosure of a shopping list for the government on the 24th. There were also mobilizations abroad with the tag #StopBolsonaro.

==== February ====
Despite the weakening of the requests for impeachment in the Chamber of Deputies, there were still caravans and motorcades in various different parts of the country asking for the president's removal, in addition to the resumption of vaccination in some cities and the return of emergency aid. The protests took place in 65 cities from 20 to 21 February.

==== March ====
In many Brazilian cities, such as São Paulo, Rio de Janeiro, Belo Horizonte, Brasília, Fortaleza, Curitiba, Goiânia, Porto Alegre, Vitória, João Pessoa, Salvador, Recife and Natal, cacerolazos were registered on 23 March during a speech by President Jair Bolsonaro. On that day, Brazil surpassed the mark of 3 thousand deaths by COVID-19 for the first time. According to the press, the cacerolazos were more popular than the last time, which was a reflection of the president's fall in popularity since the beginning of the year. Although the speech lasted 4 minutes, the protests lasted for more than 5 minutes. The following day, the television program on the Rede Globo presented by Ana Maria Braga, the Mais Você, opened with a cacerolazo, demonstrating against Bolsonaro. The presenter said: "Everyone gets the cacerolazo they deserve".

==== May ====
Image of an inflatable doll of the President of the Republic, Jair Bolsonaro (no party), during the protests in Brasília.

Demonstration on Avenida Paulista in São Paulo.

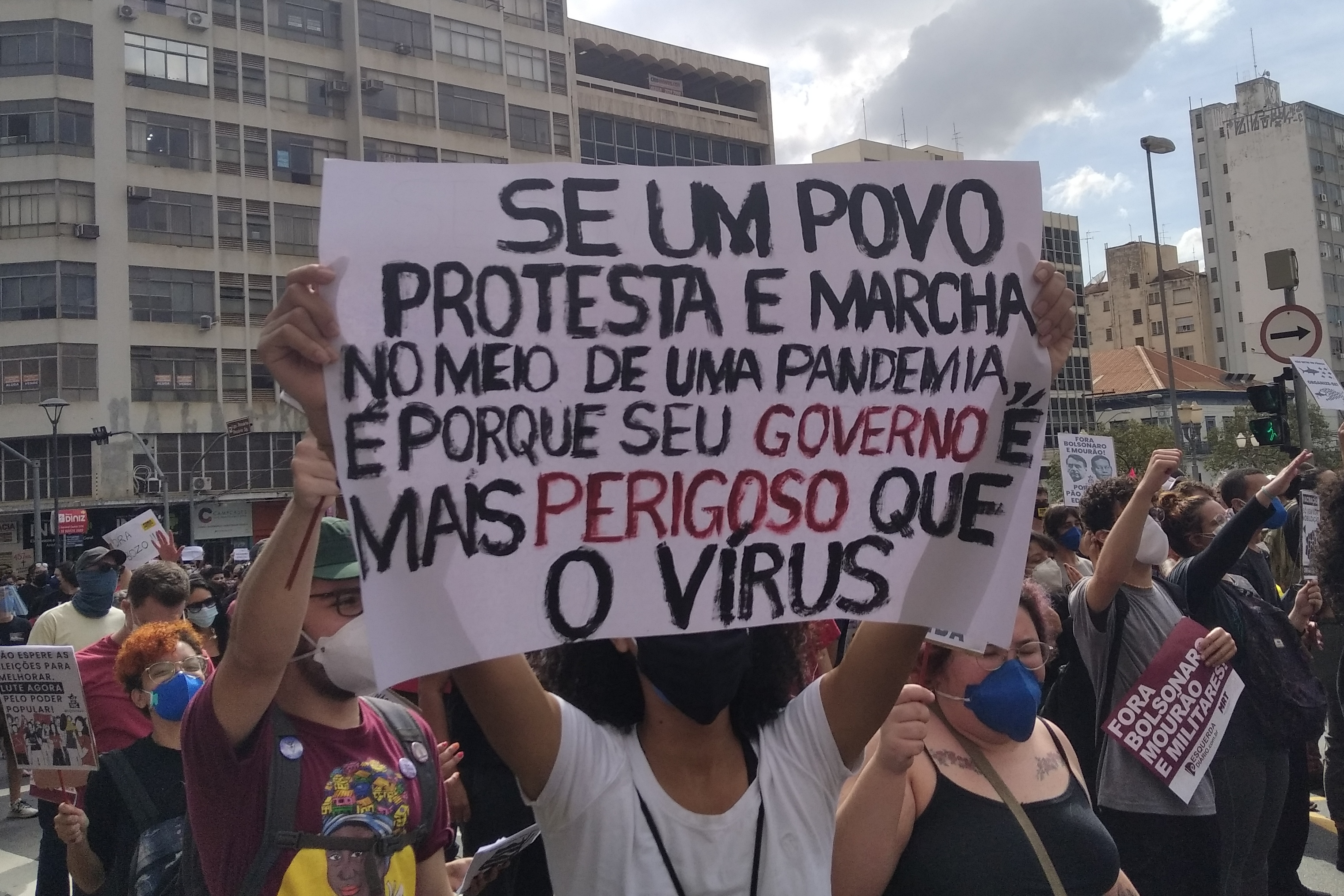
Protest against Bolsonaro in Campinas

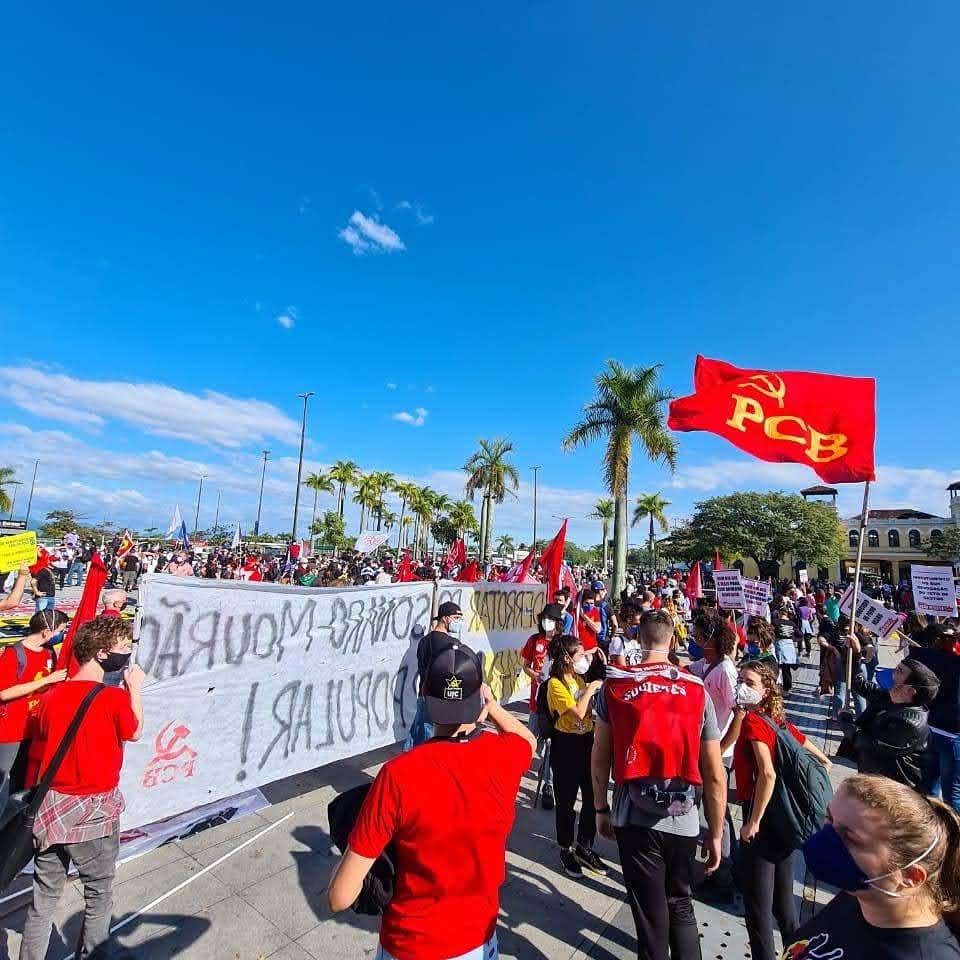
Protest against Jair Bolsonaro in Florianópolis

Members of syndical unions and football clubs, alongside opposition parties and movements announced protests in at least 85 cities for 29 May, starting to adopt, in addition to agendas such as the impeachment of Jair Bolsonaro and the return of emergency aid at R$600.00, protesters also expressed criticism of the encouragement of the COVID kit, opposition to denialism, support for vaccination campaigns, nurses and the COVID-19 CPI (which investigated actions of Federal and local Governments during the pandemic, especially the use of medications without proven efficacy against COVID-19 and the refusal to purchase vaccines), some protesters also demanded ending budget cuts for education and police violence (especially against the black population), using the context of the Massacre of Jacarezinho, some also raised agendas such as protection of natives and the environment. According to the organizers, at least 213 cities had acts against the government, 128 more than announced, and 420,000 demonstrators reportedly attended the protests.

In Brasília, some demonstrators carried banners in support of the former president Luiz Inácio Lula da Silva, as well as demands against governor Ibaneis Rocha (MDB). According to the organizers, more than 30,000 people participated in the protests in the federal capital. In Recife, there was repression by the Pernambuco Military Police against protesters, resulting in the Daniel Campelo case, where three people were injured and four were arrested. Among the wounded, there were two men who were not at the protest and were hit in the eyes, partially losing their sight. During the repression, the local councilor, Liana Cirne, from the Workers' Party tried to negotiate with police officers who were in a vehicle, but was attacked with pepper spray. A day earlier, the Public Ministry allegedly recommended the organizers to not hold protests in the region, but the governor of the state, Paulo Câmara, and his deputy, Luciana Santos said that they did not authorize the use of force against the protesters. In São Paulo, the protests blocked the two lanes of the Paulista Avenue, occupying seven blocks, starting at the height of the São Paulo Art Museum (MASP). The demonstration ended with the dispersal of the participants in the Rua da Consolação (Consolation Street), going towards the Praça Roosevelt (Roosevelt Park). Although there was agglomeration, protocols such as the use of masks and social distancing were observed in some points, as well as in some cities, where there were acts organized in Indian lines. According to organizers, 80 thousand people would have attended the protest in São Paulo. Artists from TV Globo such as Samantha Schmutz, Julia Lemmertz, Maria Ribeiro, Mônica Martelli, Ana Hikari, Renata Sorrah, Fernanda Lima, Guta Stresser, Luisa Arraes and Paulo Betti, in addition to the presenter of GNT Astrid Fontenelle and the writer Gregorio Duvivier were among the participants in the movements. There were also international mobilizations in several European cities

==== June ====
Demonstration in the center of Rio de Janeiro.

Mural with the names of COVID-19 victims extended in Rio de Janeiro during demonstrations

During his speech in the 2nd day of June, President Bolsonaro was the target of cacerolazos in several cities in the country, including the main capitals, such as São Paulo, Recife, Rio de Janeiro, Salvador, Belo Horizonte, Brasília, among others. Protesters criticized the lack of measures taken by the federal government in the fight against COVID-19. The statement was made in the context of street demonstrations held on 29 May and the COVID-19 CPI in progress. The transmission also took place hours after the announcement of the forecast by the governor of São Paulo, João Doria (PSDB), that the entire adult population of his state would be vaccinated against COVID-19 until the end of October.

A second act took place on 19 June, also bringing together social movements. According to the organizers, more than 400 cities were expected to participate in the movement. The presence of the ex-President Lula on the demonstration in São Paulo, which took place again on the Paulista Avenue, was speculated, but with repercussions among organizations (fearing to turn the protests into an electoral platform) and Lula himself not confirming whether he would go or not, the rumors quickly disappeared.

The protests on 19 June were considered by organizers to be significantly larger than those on 29 May, with 427 events taking place in 366 cities in all states, including the Federal District, and in all capitals across the country, attracting 750,000 people. In the city of São Paulo, where the biggest demonstration of the day took place, the Paulista Avenue was blocked in both directions, with about nine blocks being occupied. During the demonstrations in São Paulo, there was a release of red balloons in honor of the victims of COVID-19, coinciding with the moment when the country registered 500 thousand deaths caused by the pandemic. In addition, there were reports of vandalism, with a small group raiding two banks, including a branch located at the Mackenzie Presbyterian University, a bus stop was also raided, and a dumpster was set on fire. According to the Popular Brazil Front and the Front People Without Fear, around one hundred thousand demonstrators participated in the demonstration on the Paulista Avenue that day, and, according to the Human Rights Commission of the OAB, the demonstration reached an extension of 1.8 km, from Rua da Consolação to Avenida Paulista. In the city of Rio de Janeiro, the concentration began in the morning, at the statue of Zumbi dos Palmares, in the Praça Onze (Eleven Park). After concentration, the group walked to Presidente Vargas Avenue, occupying three lanes, in the direction of Candelária. Protesters also held a minute of silence in honor of the then 500,000 COVID-19 victims in the country. In Recife, the protest ended with a symbolic hug on the bridges where workers were wounded in the repression of the military police against the 29 May demonstration. In Brasília, Indians from various tribes also participated in the demonstrations, asking for the demarcation of indigenous lands. Acts also took place in other countries. In all, 53 cities confirmed acts, protests also happened the day before in Washington and the following day in Rome.

On 26 June, after the "Covaxingate" revelations of the Federal Deputy Luis Miranda (DEM-DF) and his brother Luis Ricardo Miranda on Friday (25th) the COVID-19 CPI found a scheme of overpricing in the acquisition of Covaxin vaccine doses, in the afternoon of the following day a group of protesters formed by the movement Esquerda Diário and the party Unidade Popular held a demonstration in São Paulo on Avenida Paulista, near the Museum of Arts (MASP), demanding the president's impeachment. According to the protesters, the protest was just a "warm up" for the demonstrations at the national level on 3 and 24 July There were also events in Santa Catarina in at least four cities, as the protests did not take place in on 19 June due to heavy rains, in addition to serving as a response to the president's visit to Chapecó.

On 30 June, there were also demonstrations in ten states and the Federal District against PL 490, known as the "marco temporal" (temporary mark), which limits the demarcation of indigenous lands.

There was an act in Brasília on 30 June with the objective of pressuring the President of the Chamber of Deputies Arthur Lira (PP-AL) to open one of Jair Bolsonaro's impeachment requests, in addition to marking the day for the delivery of the "super request", which was signed by opposition parties, federal deputy Joice Hasselmann (PSL-SP), syndical unions, student groups and social movements. Participating members included movements and unions such as the National Union of Students (UNE), Black Coalition for Rights, Syndical and Popular Central Conlutas (CSP-Conlutas), Free Brazil Movement and others, in addition to the president of the Workers' Party Gleisi Hoffmann and federal deputy Alexandre Frota (PSDB-SP).

==== July ====
Protests also sparked on 3 July due to the threat by Bolsonaro of not recognizing defeat in the 2022 election due to a supposed electoral fraud after the opposition's claim that Bolsonaro will lose the election, Among the cities abroad with protests were Freiburg and Berlin, in Germany, Cambridge, in the United Kingdom, Geneva, in Switzerland and Dublin, in Ireland. The protests were later measured in tens of thousands with BBC News reporting that the protests were also motivated by allegations of corruption in the purchase of vaccines. In São Paulo, protesters burned a bank agency and plundered a bus stop, a vehicle shop and a university. São Paulo State Military Police tried to disperse the protesters with pepper spray and moral effect bombs, but they answered, attacking the policemen with sticks, stones, rockets, railings and bikes. A policemen was hurt, and two demonstrators were arrested, Bolsonaro criticized the protests on his Twitter account. He said that "[n]o genocide will be pointed out. No authoritarian escalation or "anti-democratic act" will be cited. No threat to democracy will be warned. No search and apprehension will be made. No secrecy will be broken. Remember: it was never for health or democracy, it has always been for power!".

Social movements and trade union centrals called for an act in Cinelândia, in Rio de Janeiro on 13 July, asking for the impeachment of President. The demonstration started peacefully but ended in riots. Police used pepper spray, stun bombs and Batons to disperse the protesters. A man and a woman were arrested for making graffiti

In Belo Horizonte, a group of protesters set fire to tires on the Rua dos Caetés in an act against the government on 23 July. The act took place in the early morning without any records of fighting. In Curitiba, a group of protesters gathered in the center of the capital, and after a discussion, councilor Renato Freitas, from the Workers' Party, who participated in the protest, was detained by municipal guards on the allegation of aggression, which he denies. The councilor claims to have been a victim of arbitrary and racist violence. Renato was released three hours later. Both his party and the Brazilian Bar Association repudiated the prison. Social movements and left-wing organizations decided, on 22 June, to schedule new acts for 24 July. The organizations and movements also decided to reinforce their support for the opening of an impeachment process against President Jair Bolsonaro, At least 430 Brazilian cities in 27 states and 15 cities abroad confirmed events for that day.

According to organizers, the events of 24 July brought together 600,000 people in 509 events throughout Brazil and abroad. In the city of São Paulo, the demonstration took place on Avenida Paulista, blocking all fifteen blocks of the avenue. From 5 pm onwards, protesters began to move towards Rua da Consolação. Organizers estimated 70,000 people attended the demonstration. At the end of the demonstration, there was a confrontation between protesters and the PM, which ended with the arrest of 3 people involved in the protest, in addition to a photographer who controlled a drone that was flying over the place. Another 7 were detained before the confrontation. Hours before the demonstrations, protesters linked to the group Peripheral Revolution set fire to the Statue of Borba Gato in the East Zone of São Paulo, forcing the alteration of subway and bus lines. A man suspected of having led the group to the statue was arrested the next day. In the weeks after the act, three people suspected of causing the fire were arrested. There was also a demonstration in the city of Rio de Janeiro, where protesters were demonstrating concentrated in the center, in front of the monument in homage to Zumbi dos Palmares, and headed for Praça da Candelária. The demonstration took place peacefully, but in the end, at the time of dispersion, the Military Police approached some demonstrators and there was an outbreak of turmoil. The Police used pepper spray against the protesters, a man was arrested, and a woman was injured. In Brasília, the protest occupied the Esplanade of Ministries, and took place peacefully, with protesters calling for the president's impeachment and more vaccines against COVID-19. In Recife, thousands of protesters against the president gathered at the Praça do Derby (Derby Park) in the morning and headed to the Avenida Guararapes (Guararapes Avenue). Besides the president of the republic, protesters also criticized the president of the Chamber of Deputies Arthur Lira, and the military officials that make up the government.

==== September ====
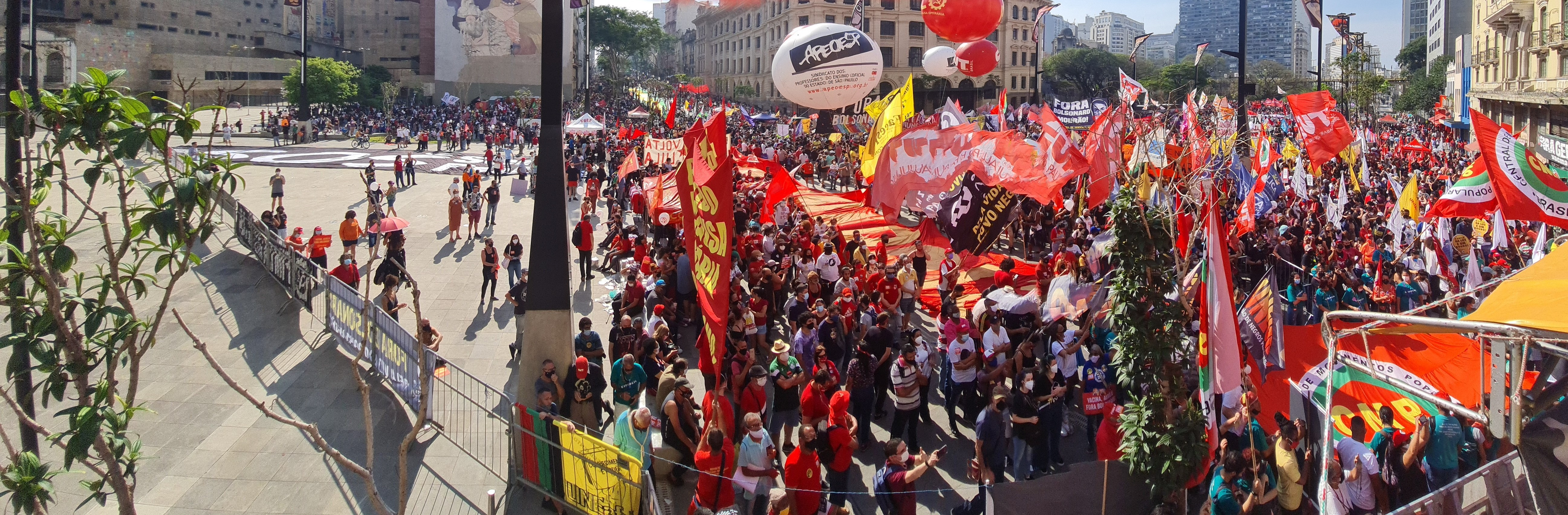
Anti-Bolsonaro protest on Avenida Paulista, in São Paulo, on September 12.

In response to acts organized by supporters of the current government on 7 September and which had the participation of the president of the republic, acts took place in some Brazilian cities, largely coinciding with the "Scream of the Excluded". In São Paulo, due to the fact that the favorable demonstrations took place on Avenida Paulista, the concentration took place in the Vale do Anhangabaú, being the first time since the beginning of the movements that the protests did not take place on the main street of the Brazilian megalopolis. Protests against the government also happened outside the country in several European cities On 6 September, a video went viral on social networks of the hacker activism group Anonymous calling on the population to participate in the protests against the government. The video was posted on 3 September in the site of one of the institutions investigated by the CPI of COVID-19 for funding the Covaxin vaccine to the Ministry of Health and pharmaceutical industries, and which had the site invaded during the testimony of one of the representatives of the institution.

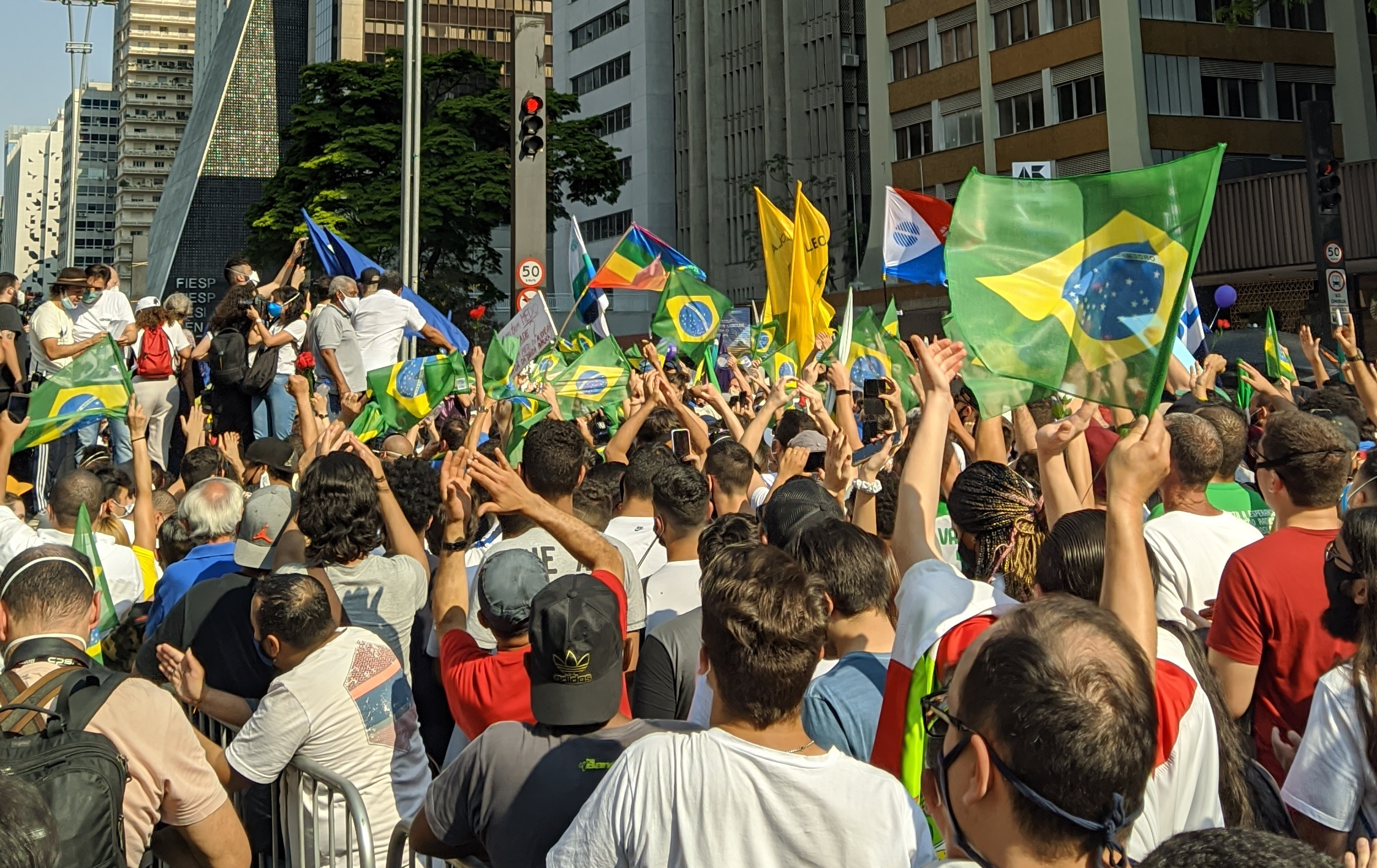
Protest against the president on the Paulista Avenue in September 12

On the 12th day of September, the first demonstrations took place in the streets called upon by right-wing movements and parties, alongside participation from a group of left-wing Unions and parties. Despite being carried out separately from the main anti-government alliance, the act was welcomed by sectors of the front. The choice of date is due to the fact that by the month of September, half of the population would already be vaccinated. The demonstrations took place in eighteen capitals and in the Federal District, but with low participation. In São Paulo, around 6,000 people were present, the event brought together, for the first time on the same platform, politicians from different political currents, such as the presidential pre-candidates Ciro Gomes, João Amoedo, Simone Tebet, Luiz Henrique Mandetta and João Doria, in addition to politicians Isa Penna, Orlando Silva, Arthur do Val, Joice Hasselmann and Tabata Amaral. The vice-president of the Chamber of Deputies, Marcelo Ramos was also present at the act. the Worker's Party, the party of former president Luiz Inácio Lula da Silva, decided not to participate in the demonstration.

On 23 September, the MST protested in the São Paulo stock exchange, According to the protesters, the goals were "the end of hunger, corruption, poverty and the Bolsonaro government", in addition to Brazilian flags, several banners and boards with criticism to the President and his ministers and their government policies were seen among the mob.

Protests also happened in front of Flávio Bolsonaro's Mansion on September 30, the protests were called upon by the Landless Workers' Movement and the Front People Without Fear, according to the police, the protest was peaceful and no cases of violence were reported.

==== October ====
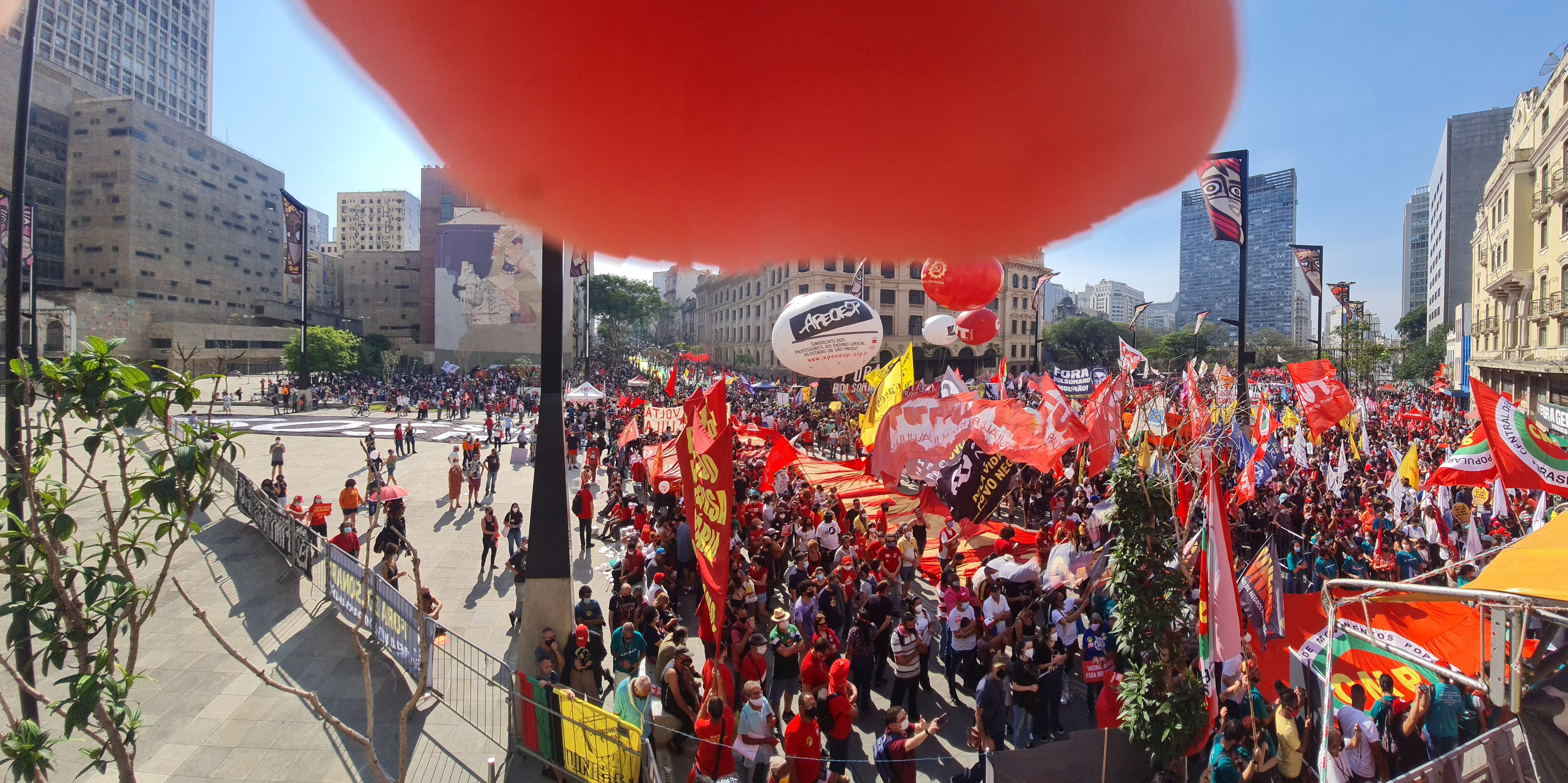
Protest against the president on the Vale do Anhangabaú

Acts confirmed by Brazilian state: 1 to 4 acts confirmed 4 to 10 acts confirmed More than 10 acts confirmed

On 2 October, Protests were held in all states of Brazil and in over 25 cities in America and Europe. The protests received massive support from political parties and movements all across the political spectrum On 12 September, for the first time, member parties of the pro-impeachment front and politicians from other parties, as well as syndical unions, student groups and social movements scheduled events for this date. 214 events were held in 206 cities in all 27 states across the country, in addition to 29 events in 15 countries, the protests accumulated together a total of 700,000 demonstrators according to the organizers. The biggest movements happened in the states of Rio de Janeiro, São Paulo, Minas Gerais and Rio Grande do Sul, in addition to Brasília. Outside the country, protests occurred in several European cities, with some countries such as Germany even hosting 4 simultaneous acts. in addition to protests in front of the Brazilian embassies in the United States, Canada, Argentina and Puerto Rico, a protest was also held in front of the international tribunal in The Hague. According to the protesters' estimates, 100,000 people participated in the protest in the avenida paulista, but according to the Military Police, there were 8,000 protesters.

In São Paulo, the events on the Avenida Paulista brought together leaders such as Ciro Gomes, Fernando Haddad, Randolfe Rodrigues, Alessandro Vieira, Guilherme Boulos, Manuela D'Ávila, Simone Tebet and Luíz Henrique Mandetta, among others. With the Bolsonaro government's popularity declining, the large uptake in protest would only be a consequence of the economic crisis that is plaguing the country. For the first time in many years, the Workers' Party, a left-wing party and the Social Liberal Party, a right-wing party (and the current president's former party) came together for a single objective, which in this case, is to call for the impeachment of the president and "charge for the deaths caused by the COVID-19 pandemic and the economic crisis". it was also the first time where members and supporters the New Party participated alongside left-wing parties in the same protest.

In the 7th of that month, protests against the government happened in front of the Ministry of the Economy's headquarters in Brasília. Protesters spread dollar bills smeared with red ink (to represent blood) and stamped with a photo of the ministry's building on one side and the face of Minister Paulo Guedes on the other, the act was called upon by syndical unions and student groups, the protest called for the impeachment of the president and his ministers, as well as an end to "the administrative reforms, hunger, corruption and poverty", overall the protest had over 200 people and lasted for over 2 hours.

The next day, protests happened in Italy, called upon by environmental activists, protests happened in Anguillara, in one occasion, protesters threw horse waste in the city's prefecture, as well as painting and graffitiing it. the protests were called upon after the city's decision to give Bolsonaro the title of Honorary Citizen, according to the protesters and organizers, it was also called upon to protest against "social and environmental problems and the deaths caused by the pandemic".

A protest was also held in Brasília on October 30 where some protesters staged a performance with Bolsonaro inside a shopping cart pushed by Lira. About 50 people participated in the demonstration and performance altogether.

==== November ====
In early November, protests happened in Anguillara, Italy, where, at some point, a small group of anti-Bolsonaro protesters verbally clashed with pro-government protesters, no cases of physical violence were reported during the protests and the ceremony where the president was given the title of Honorary Citizen continued normally.

A protest was also planned for 15 November, organized by the pro-impeachment front. The date was chosen because it coincides with the Proclamation of the Republic holiday. However, due to disagreements between the organizers and the difficulty of bringing groups together between the events of the 15th and the 20th, the Date where the Black Consciousness Day is celebrated, the national front, also called "Direitos Já" opted to postpone the demonstrations until January 2022, but even with the postponement, the protests did not take place and other movements began to take place outside the front in separate events.

On 16 November, Federal police protested against the government, protesters were seen shouting "Bolsonaro out", anti-government signs and banners were also seen, protesters claimed that the government was not giving them "enough funding and valorization" and that they had "lost rights and recognition" for their work, the protests were also called upon after accusations of interference by the president in the Federal Police, a joint note was also signed by several police unions condemning the president's actions and calling for "further valorization of the Federal Police".

On 25 November, protests happened in the largest "Favela" in São Paulo, on that day, protesters marched against the government, also criticizing racism and high rates of unemployment, hunger and deaths caused by the COVID-19 pandemic, the protests started at 18h30, ending in front of the evangelical church of the community, where members of the catholic, evangelical and traditional African churches gave a speech asking for "more food" and the impeachment of the president, a choir happened together with a cacerolazo in an act of protest against the president, a car also passed by reading the names of the victims of the pandemic in the Favela.

==== December ====
At the start of the month, hundreds of workers of the Brazilian Internal Revenue Service quit their jobs as a protest against the president's decision to raise the salaries of the Federal Police, the organizers of the strike claimed that the government was not giving them support and that the president was trying to "buy the Federal Police's support".

On 31 December, New Year's Eve, cacerolazos were registered in several cities such as Fortaleza, São Paulo, Belo Horizonte, Salvador, Recife and Brasília during the president's speech, people in buildings and in the street were heard shouting anti-government slogans, the protests happened after a speech where Bolsonaro called for "the opposition to make a giant cacerolazo" against him, as "they are annoyed that we've had 3 years without corruption".

=== Pro-government ===
==== January ====
Protesters in Belém on 31 January 2021, defended the election for the presidency of the Chamber of Deputies of Arthur Lira and spoke against Bolsonaro's impeachment.

==== March ====
Nationwide protests supporting the government happened first in 14 March. In Fortaleza, the state military police repressed the protesters, which shouted "Camilo dictator" (referring to Ceará's governor, Camilo Santana) and included the state deputy Andre Fernandes, who is politically against Camilo Santana. The police officers used pepper spray and arrested 16 people. Answering the arrests, another protest occurred on 15 March in Fortaleza, where they shouted "Camilo out" and expressed their discontent with the Supreme Court minister Edson Fachin. 10 were arrested.

==== April ====
Another nationwide pro-Gov't protests happened in 11 April. Entitled "March of the Christian Family for Freedom", it was, according to the organizers, against communism, lockdowns and a decision of the Supreme Court that allowed states to close churches and religious temples.

==== May ====
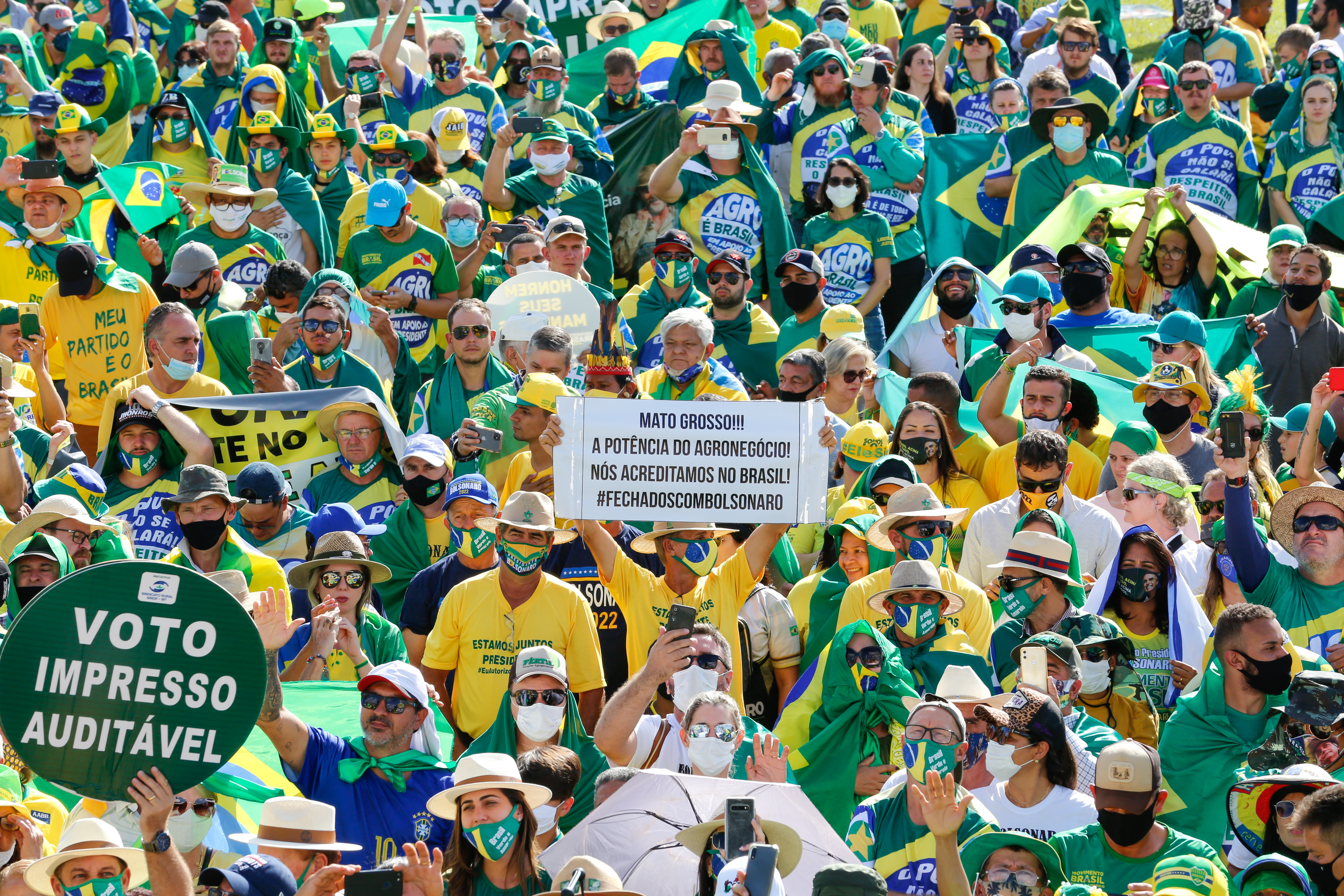
Pro-government protest in Brasília

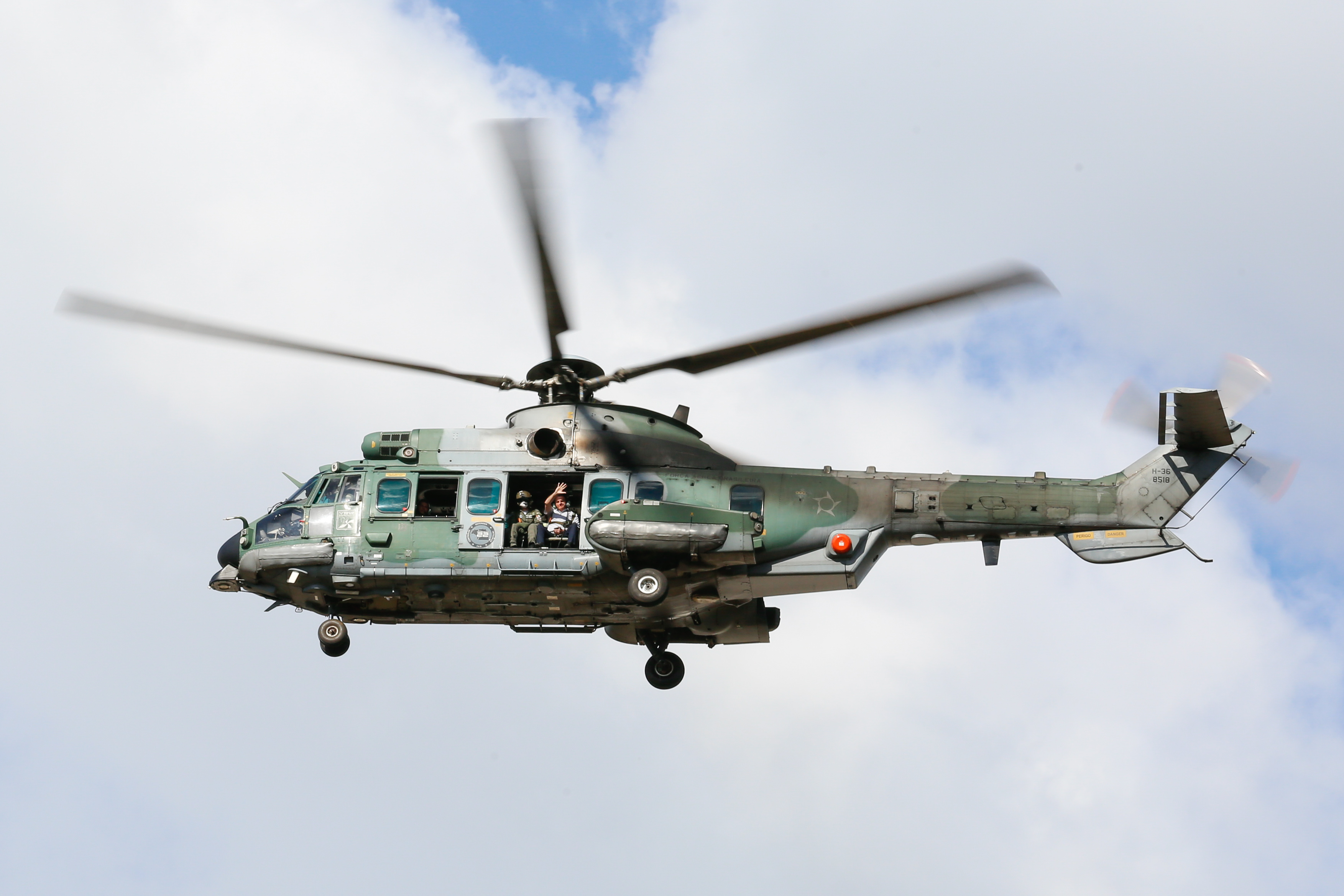
Bolsonaro flies over protests in Brasília

More nationwide protests happened on 1 May, in state capitals and inner cities. The protests happened both as motorcades and demonstrations, and the protesters shouted "I authorize", making reference to the president's claim that he will invoke Article 142 of the Brazilian constitution to "restore the individual rights mentioned by the Constitution's Article 5" (one of the few irrevocable clauses of the Constitution, according to Article 60, Paragraph [§] 4th, incise IV).

At the State of Rio Grande do Sul, protests took place in Porto Alegre (the state's capital), Santa Maria, Passo Fundo and Rio Grande, and in Minas Gerais, Belo Horizonte (the state's capital) and four other cities had protests. At the Brazilian capital, Brasília, Bolsonaro flew by helicopter over the protests. At the state of Ceará, the protests happened in Fortaleza as a motorcade at the federal highway BR-116. There were also protests on the state's southern city of Juazeiro do Norte. The Juazeiro's protest was dispersed with the use of a helicopter, and in Fortaleza, 17 protesters were arrested and taken to the 2nd and 30th Police Districts. Federal Deputy Bia Kicis, on her Twitter account, condemned the arrests, and City Councilor Carmelo Neto gave juridical support for the arrested protesters. At Belém, the capital of the state of Pará, a pro-Government motorcade took place around 8:30 a.m., while in Altamira, the pro-Bolsonaro motorcade was reportedly prohibited. In total, protests interrupted traffic in 11 states and in the Federal District.

President Bolsonaro participated in a motorcycle ride ("motociata") for Mother's Day (9 May) in Brasília.

Pro-government protests, organized by movements Marcha da Família Cristã and Brasil Verde e Amarelo, took place at the Ministries Esplanade, with the participation of Bolsonaro and some of his ministers, all arriving by horse. The protests started on early rising and ended at 5 p.m., with a pause for lunch at 11 a.m.

In Rio de Janeiro, protests took place at Copacabana Beach, while in São Paulo, at Avenida Paulista. In Fortaleza, protests took place at Avenida Beira Mar, with the participation of the Pro-Gov't group Endireita Fortaleza. Protests also took place in Curitiba, Belo Horizonte and a hundred other cities.

Bolsonaro participated in another "motociata", in Rio de Janeiro, with an estimated number of 38,000 to 39,000 motorcycles, at a 30-kilometer path from Barra Olympic Park, at the city's West zone, to the Flamengo Landfill, at the South Zone on May 23. The participation of the former Health Minister, General Eduardo Pazuello,

==== June ====
Bolsonaro participated in another motociata, in São Paulo, called "Acelera para Cristo". The Public Security Secretariat of the State of São Paulo (SSP-SP) used 6,000 police officers to guarantee the event's safety, and Bolsonaro was charged for not using a mask.

A motociata without Bolsonaro's presence was held in Recife on 12 June, starting at 10 a.m. at Orla da Piedade. The number of motorcycles is estimated at 3,500. Some came from inner Pernambuco, and others, from states like Paraíba and Bahia.

Bolsonaro held another motociata in Chapecó (State of Santa Catarina) on 26 June with the city's mayor, João Rodrigues (PSD), in a 90-kilometer path from Flávio Baldissera Industrial District to the city of Xanxerê, and back to the District. According to the Highway Military Police, 50,000 were present.

==== July ====
Bolsonaro supporters in Salvador organized another "motociata" on Bahia's Independence Day (2 July), when the State of Bahia commemorates the end of the Siege of Salvador. The "motociata" defended Bolsonaro's government and ballot voting, and was described as "impressive".

Bolsonaro's supporters protested in Brasília for the legalization of firearms to the civil population on 9 July, Protests supporting Bolsonaro and ballot voting, against mandatory vaccinations and vaccine passports, with critics to the Supreme Court, were also registered in Fortaleza's Portugal Plaza on 19 July.

==== August ====
Protests were registered this day, nationwide, supporting Bolsonaro and ballot voting, in many Brazilian cities.

- State of São Paulo

Protests happened in many cities of the State: in the capital, São Paulo, protests happened at the Paulista Ave. The protest was labeled 'admirable' and affected 21 metro lines. Protests were also recorded in Bauru, São Carlos, Araçatuba, São José do Rio Preto, Santos, Campinas, Sorocaba, Jundiaí, Ribeirão Preto, Piracicaba, São José dos Campos and Pindamonhangaba.

- State of Rio de Janeiro

A protest, started at 10 a.m., was registered in Rio's Copacabana, in the Atlântica Avenue. Over a thousand people were there, according to BandNews FM. In Niterói, protests happened at Icaraí Beach, and in Campos dos Goytacazes, there was a protest, starting at 10 a.m., in front of the City Council, followed by a motorcade.

- State of Ceará

Protests were registered in Fortaleza, Quixadá, Juazeiro do Norte and Canindé. In Fortaleza, protests happened at the Portugal Plaza, crowding it. Participated in the act State Deputy André Fernandes, City Councilors for Fortaleza Carmelo Neto and Priscila Costa and Federal Deputy for Ceará Capitão Wagner Sousa. In Juazeiro do Norte, a motorcade happened near Giradouro Plaza, while in Canindé, a protest happened at Dr. Aramis Plaza. In Quixadá, a protest was reported at José de Barros Plaza and Rodrigues Junior Street, at the city's Center.

- State of Minas Gerais

In Belo Horizonte, a protest happened at the Liberty Plaza, with 5,000 people. Organized by movements Brasil Conservador, Direita BH and Marcha da Família Cristã, the protest had more people than expected - 1,500. In Juiz de Fora, 1,500 protested at the Antônio Carlos Plaza (at the city center). The protest was organized by the movement Direita Minas, and started with the National Anthem and with a pray for Bolsonaro. In Uberlândia, there was a motorcade and a 'motociata', similar to what happened in Poços de Caldas, Varginha and Pouso Alegre.

- State of Pará

About 20,000 people protested in Belém. The act started at 8 a.m. (local time, 9 a.m. in Brasília) at the Docks Station, and by 9 a.m., the protesters went to the Republic Plaza, through President Vargas Ave, where they sung the National Anthem. After that moment, they went through Nazaré Ave to the Quintino Bocaiúva cross, passed through Boaventura da Silva Street and ended the act on Visconde de Souza Franco Ave, around noon. There were people by car, motorcycle or walking. Politicians, such as the Federal Deputy Éder Mauro, State Deputy Delegado Caveira and Federal Police Officer Everaldo Eguchi, were present.

- State of Rio Grande do Norte

In Natal, protests were registered at the crossing between Nevaldo Rocha and Salgado Filho Aves, in front of the Midway Mall. The number of protesters was estimated in thousands. A motorcade was registered in Mossoró.

- State of Paraná

In Curitiba, protesters met at Boca Maldita, a traditional area of protests in the city's center. In Londrina, the protests started at 3 p.m., at the crossing between J.K. and Higienópolis Avenues, and, at 4:20 p.m, after the singing of the National Anthem, a motorcade happened, going through Higienópolis Ave to the Bandeira Plaza. Federal Deputy Felipe Barros, born in Londrina, was at the protest. There were motorcades registered in Foz do Iguaçu and Guarapuava.

- State of Santa Catarina

Acts were registered in the state capital, Florianópolis, and in Itajaí, Balneário Camboriú, Blumenau, Pomerode, Joinville, Criciúma, Tubarão and Chapecó. Something between 8,000 and 10,000 protesters participated in the acts.

- State of Pernambuco

Protesters in Recife gathered at Boa Viagem, at the city's south zone, at 2 p.m., and collected food for low-income families. Participated in the protest politicians Clarissa Tércio and Alberto Feitosa, of the Social Christian Party (PSC), and Minister of Tourism Gilson Machado Neto.

A protest defending ballot voting happened in Brasília in the 5th, in front of Annex II of the Chamber of Deputies, with the participation of Federal Deputy Bia Kicis.

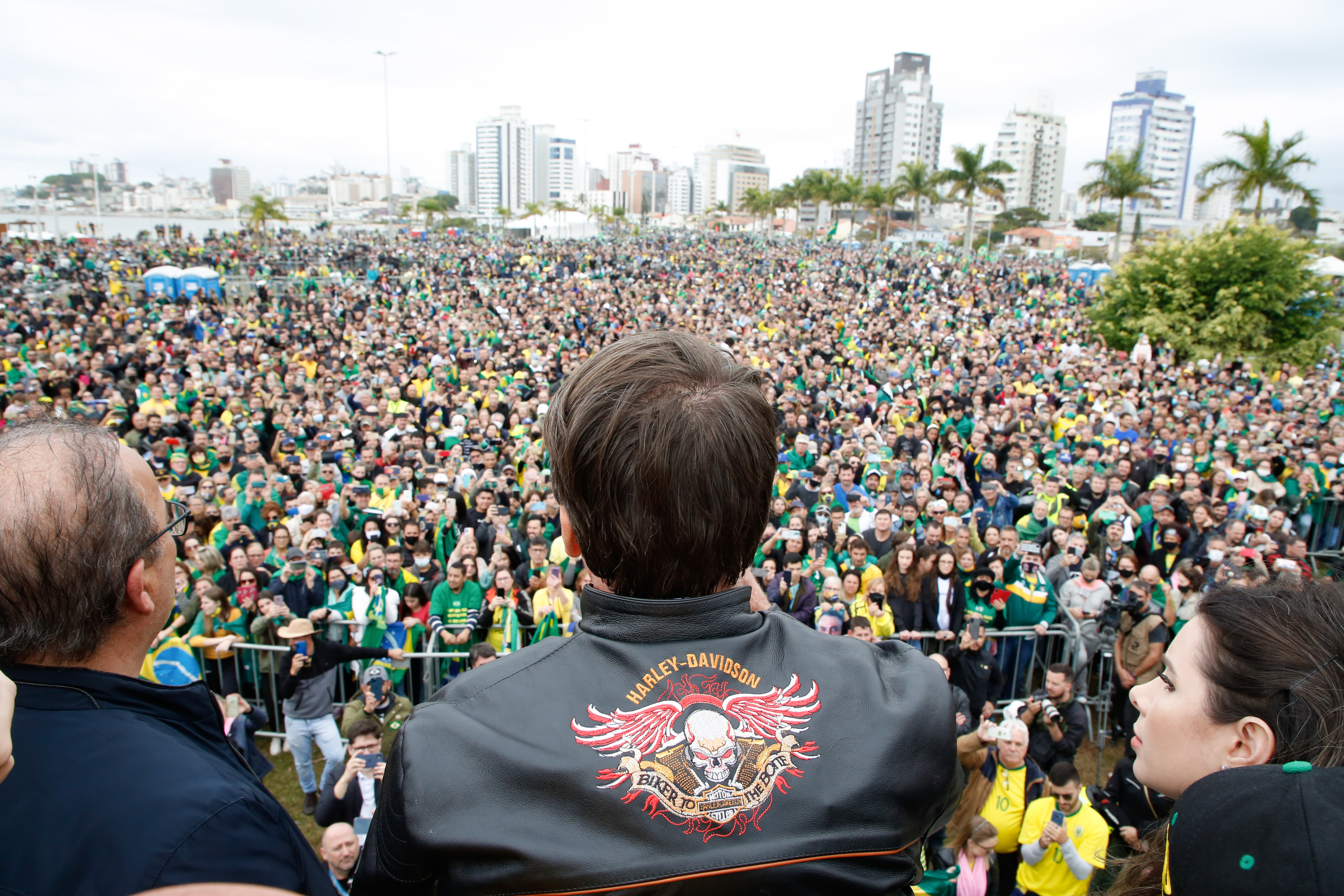

Bolsonaro held a 'motociata' in Florianópolis, Santa Catarina's state capital in the 7th, gathering 35,000 people, including 25,000 motorcycles, with 250 participating by boat. Participated in the act State Deputy Kennedy Nunes, Senator Jorginho Mello, businessman Luciano Hang, Federal Deputies Fábio Schiochet, Carla Zambelli and Caroline de Toni, Santa Catarina Vice-Governor Daniele Reinehr and Florianópolis City Councilor Maryanne Mattos.

==== September ====
===== 7 September: preparations =====
On August 23, it was reported that military policemen were organizing themselves to participate in the September 7 acts in São Paulo and Rio de Janeiro. The next day, the Public Ministry of São Paulo opened an investigation against State Military Policemen who supported the act, specially Aleksander Lacerda, commander of the Inner Policing Command-7 (Comando de Policiamento do Interior-7, CPI-7) and Augusto Araújo, of Ceagesp (Companhia de Entrepostos e Armazéns Gerais de São Paulo).

On September, STF minister Alexandre de Moraes ordered the arrest of trucker Marcos Antônio Pereira Gomes, known as 'Zé Trovão'. The Federal Police searched Trovão's house to obey Moraes' order, but Trovão was not arrested. He would later be put on a wanted list by the police, Trovão claimed he would not 'surrender' until after September 7, According to CNN Brasil, it is likely that Trovão left Brazil.

On 6 September, an Atlas Intelligence Institute poll revealed that 30% of military policemen wanted to participate in pro-Bolsonaro September 7 acts.

===== 7 September: protests =====
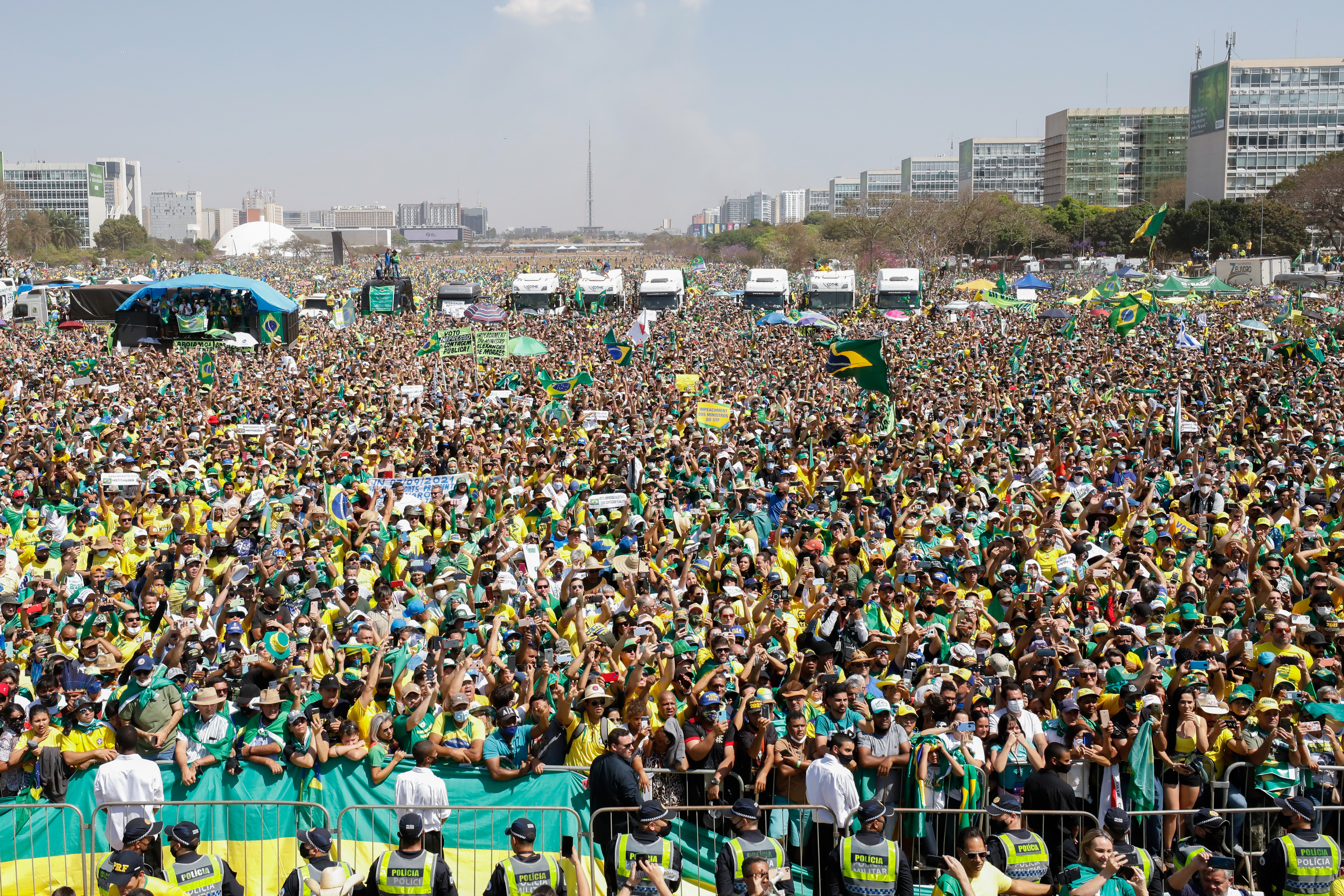
Protesters at the Ministries Esplanade in Brasília, 7 September 2021

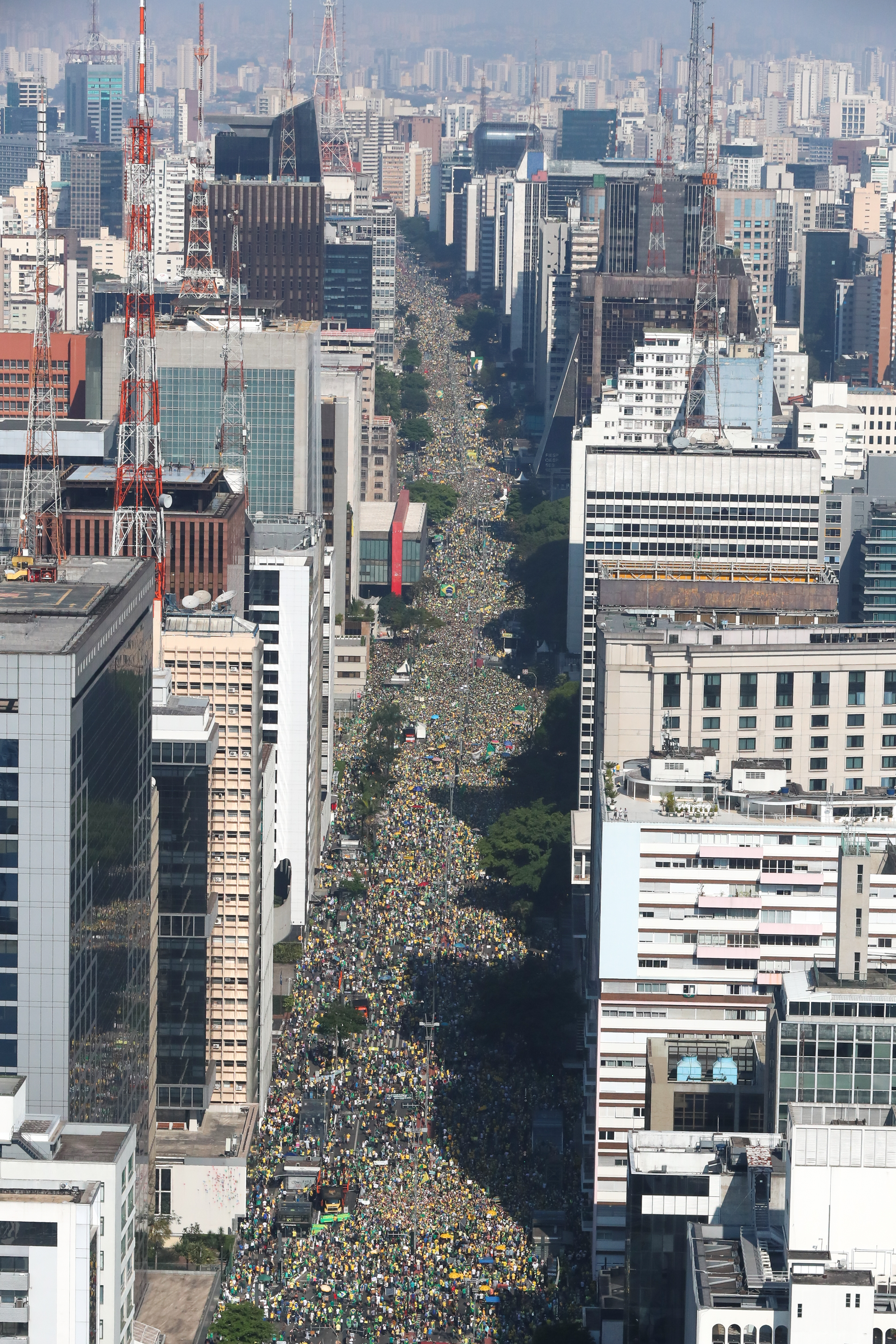
Pro-government protest in São Paulo, 7 September 2021

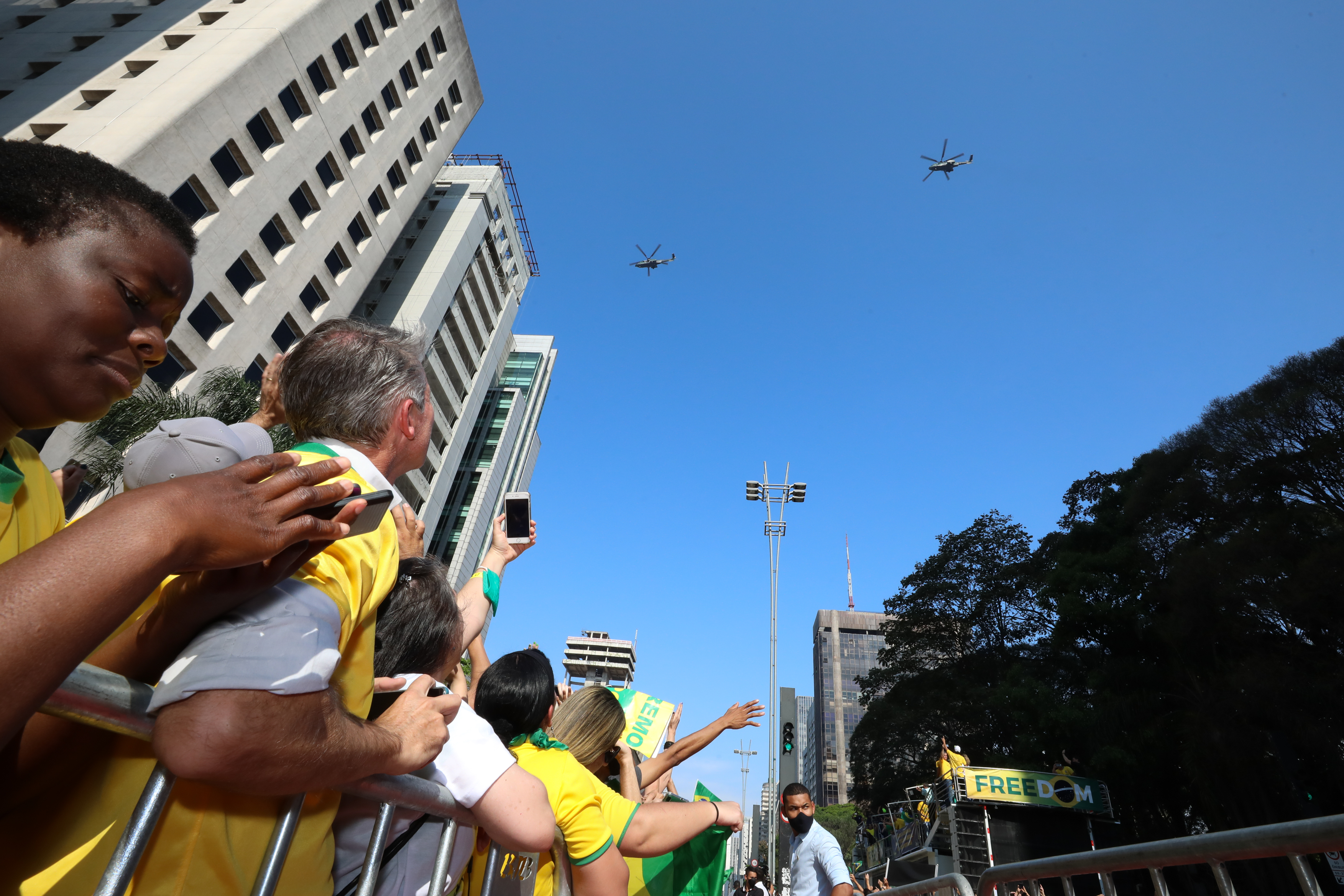
Bolsonaro flying over Paulista Avenue, 7 September 2021

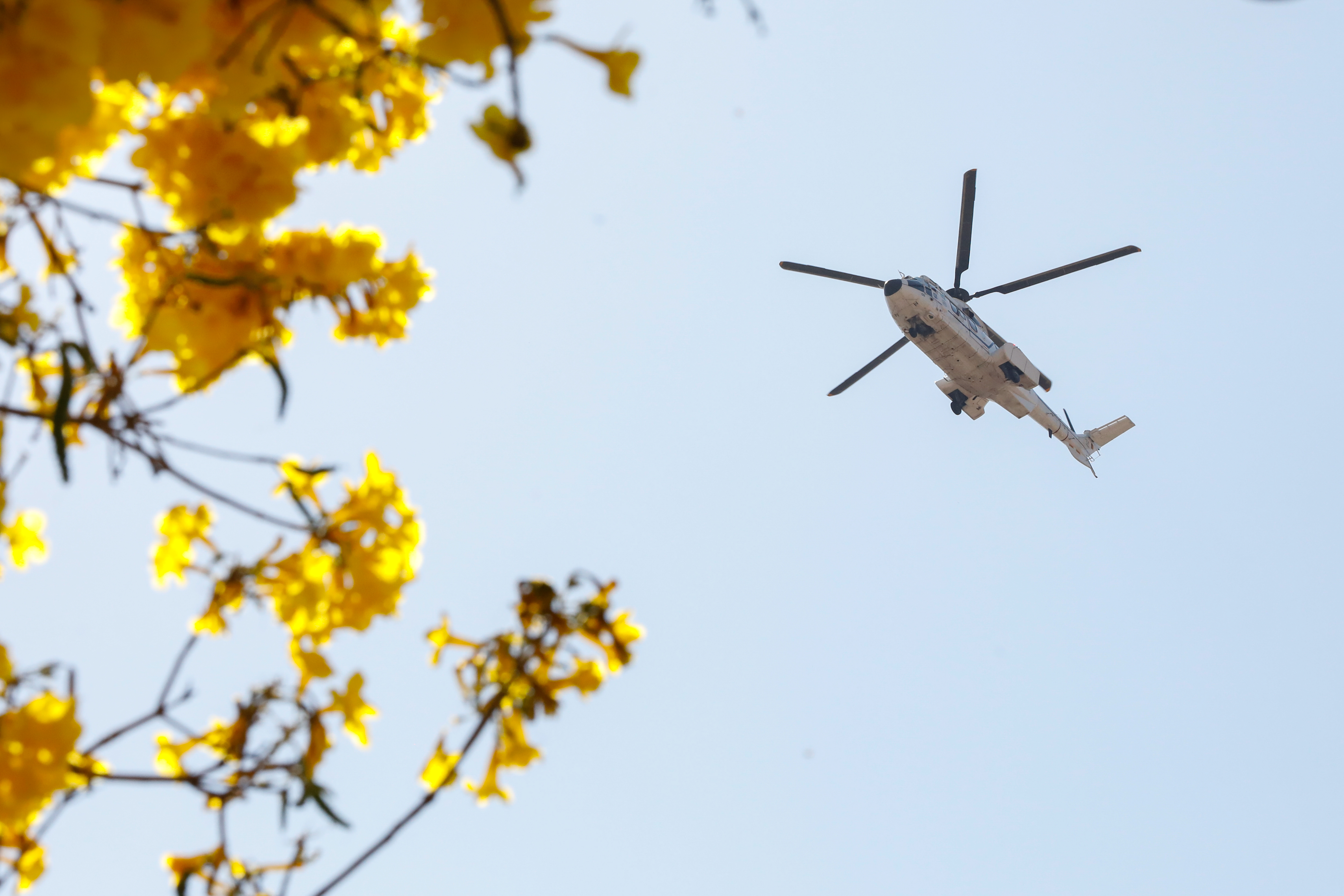
Bolsonaro flies over Brasília, 7 September 2021

The protests took place throughout the national territory from 6–8 September, before, during and after the country's independence day holiday. Demonstrations were marked by the government side and by the opposition to the Jair Bolsonaro Government.

7 September 2021, is the 199th anniversary of the Brazilian Independence. Due to the COVID-19 pandemic, the Ministry of Defense suspended the classic civil-military parade of Independence Day for the second consecutive year, However, nationwide protests occurred this day.

On the night of 6 September, a small group of pro-Bolsonaro protesters breached the blockade of the Federal District Military Police (Polícia Militar do Distrito Federal, PMDF), and walked into the Ministries Esplanade, in Brasília, many say that it was an attempt to recreate the 2021 United States Capitol attack in Brazil by invading the STF, A second barricade was formed, near the Metropolitan Cathedral, but it would be breached around 9 p.m. The breach reportedly happened with support from the PMDF policemen in place, The security forces reacted and dispersed them with tear gas and pepper spray, The federal deputy Eduardo Bolsonaro was caught that day along with the attempted invasion.

According to the Brazilian Association of Hotels Industry of the Federal District (Abih-DF), on 6 and 7 September, hotels in Brasília were operating in almost maximum capacity, with the only available rooms being superior category ones, such as presidential suites. Abih-DF's president, Henrique Severein, affirmed that such a movement was never seen.

In Salvador, a walk went from Farol da Barra do Morro de Cristo. The act started at 9 a.m. and finished at 1:30 p.m. In Fortaleza, a motorcade went from the Castelão Arena to the Portugal Plaza, gathering "thousands". The protesters sung the National Anthem and held support banners for the Federal Executive. Federal Deputies Dr. Jaziel, Capitão Wagner and State Deputies Delegado Cavalcante, Soldado Noélio and Dra. Silvana were present. The act was peaceful. There were also protests in Ceará's inner cities of Juazeiro do Norte, Sobral and Ipu.

Pro-government protesters from many country areas gathered in the Ministries Esplanade, in Brasília, on September 7, supporting ballot voting and the destitution of Supreme Court ministers. The protests happened during the morning.

Bolsonaro flew over the protest with his son, Federal Deputy Eduardo Bolsonaro, Senator Marcos Rogério, and Minister of Defense Braga Netto. He also made a speech, where he said that "we can't accept more political arrests in Brazil. Either the chief of this Power frames his [minister], or this Power might suffer what we do not want", making reference to Supreme Court's president Minister Luiz Fux, about the decisions of Minister Alexandre de Moraes. The protest gathered 400,000 people.

During the demonstrations, President Jair Bolsonaro made statements in an electric trio with a critical but controversial tone in Brasília and São Paulo. In the federal capital, Bolsonaro, without quoting the Supreme Court, saying: "We cannot accept political arrests in our Brazil anymore. Either the head of this power frames yours, or that power will suffer what we do not want. Because we value, recognize and we know the value of each Power of the Republic".

In São Paulo, protesters gathered at Paulista Avenue. Some areas with a large concentration of people made unviable moving. Near streets had some buses parked, due to caravans coming to São Paulo. The protest started in the morning.

During the demonstrations, pro-Jair Bolsonaro's government truckers organized several national strikes on federal highways. The demonstrations were observed in 15 states of Brazil, including: Bahia, Espírito Santo, Paraná, Maranhão, Rio Grande do Sul, Mato Grosso do Sul, Mato Grosso, Santa Catarina, Rio de Janeiro, Roraima, São Paulo and Minas Gerais.

According to State of Santa Catarina's news portal ND+, south state truckers' leader, Jair 'Bala' Ferraz, confirmed a truckers strike against 'the abuses of the Supreme Court'. The strike started at morning of September 7, with "no day to end". Blockades were scheduled at federal highway BR-101, in Maracajá, Arananguá and Santa Rosa do Sul, strategic areas where even small vehicles can not go through. Only emergency vehicles and 'live charge' were allowed to pass. The agency also reported that blockades also happened in Tubarão, Sombrio, São Cristóvão do Sul, São Francisco do Sul, Mafra, Canoinhas, Porto União, Papanduva, Guaramirim, Garuva, Itajaí, and at BR-101's kilometer 25, in Joinville, at the State's north. Blockades also happened in Florianópolis' areas of Palhoça and Biguaçu.

Bolsonaro flew over the Avenue and arrived on it at 3:30 p.m., where he said that "we will no longer admit people, like Alexandre de Moraes, who disrespect our Constitution", while also calling the minister a "scoundrel". According to the Military Police of São Paulo, 125,000 people were present. The measurement, however, was criticized, being labeled "out of reality" by Bolsonaro's supporters.

Even with high numbers of participants in government demonstrations, the number did not reflect what was expected for the day, according to the number reported by the military police in their survey during the protests on the avenida paulista, about 125,000 people participated of manifestations, which represents only 6% of what the event organizers expected in its dissemination. The super-expectations expected by the organizers may have caused a great disappointment, and the idea of being a giant demonstration was overthrown after the release of the official numbers of supporters.

Photos comparing the event on Avenida Paulista and the parade LGBT at the same location, shows the volume of people who participated in the demonstration. In Brasília, support groups even used photo angles to promote the grandiosity of the event, however, after the end of the demonstration, photos were compared between protesters in Brasília and a show made by the group RBD at the same venue that showed that the pop-rock band got a volume of attendees at their concerts compared to the protest in support of President Jair Bolsonaro.

In São Paulo, in another electric trio, Bolsonaro was even more aggressive, calling the Supreme Minister Alexandre de Moraes "scoundrels" and said he would not comply with court decisions: "We must, because I speak In your name Determine that all political prisoners be set free I tell you that any decision of Minister Alexandre de Moraes that President will no longer carry out. he still has time to redeem himself, he still has time to file his inquiries. Exit Alexandre de Moraes, stop being a scoundrel, stop oppressing the Brazilian people, stop censoring," said the president. He also criticized the president of the Superior Electoral Court, but without citing Luís Roberto Barroso.

In Rio de Janeiro, protesters gathered at Atlântica Avenue, in Copacabana Beach, blocking both of its two lanes. A crane raised a 12-meter Brazilian flag, and a man with a knife, an English punch and a Molotov cocktail was arrested by the police.

In São Paulo State's inner cities of Taubaté, São José dos Campos and Guaratinguetá, pro-Bolsonaro acts were reported. According to the organizers, 5,000 were present in São José dos Campos' act, but the Military Police did not publish an estimate.

In Goiânia, a "motocarreata" (motorcade with cars and motorcycles) was held in front of Goiânia Autodrome, 5-kilometer long.

During the day of 7 September 2021, in the city of Bauru, two pro-government protesters approached a protest march against the government and uttered curses. There was a small confrontation and the two were detained.

In total, acts were registered in 179 cities. In addition to cities within the national territory, pro-government protests also took place in London.

Some government supporters camped in Esplanade of the Ministries in Brasília, and later tried to invade the headquarters of the Ministry of Health on the morning of 8 September. Journalists were harassed with name-calling and shoving. They tried to protect themselves at the ministry's headquarters.

ND+ also reported that transit must paralyze near the access to the city of Irani. It was revealed that the movement started to be organized 40 days before. Buses, emergency vehicles, small cars, perishable loads and hospital supplies were allowed to go through. A strike was also scheduled to happen in Caçador, starting at 5 a.m.

Shutdowns were not monitored or recognized by entities and movements that represent the category. According to the various representatives of the categories, the stoppages were carried out autonomously by some members of the category, thus exempting the movements from possible undemocratic acts. Even without recognition of the category, there were reports of truck drivers who had their keys forcibly removed from their trucks at roadblocks.

The consequences of the stoppages of truck drivers were not as expected, considering that it did not cause shortages in any region of the country. One of the reasons for this was the decision to go on strike during a national holiday and its early closure. In addition, the demonstrations brought small problems in traffic, such as slowness and the search for users of federal roads for alternative routes.

To intensify the movement, government support groups spread fake news about a possible "State of emergency" implemented by President Jair Bolsonaro, which caused a commotion in several states in Brazil by part of the protesters. However, the fake news was quickly disproved which caused a distrust of supporters in the organization of the stoppage, thus quickly causing a loss of support.

===== 7 September: end and aftermath =====
After low adhesion, and a concern of President Jair Bolsonaro about the national shortage, was requested by the same that the strike be ended. The president's message to truck drivers divided the already weakened group, while many believed the audio was a lie, others were disappointed by the president's failure to recognize their efforts. On the night of Thursday, September 9, practically all demonstrations had already ceased throughout the national territory.

Organized for an entire month, the strike, which had low participation and a request from the president himself to end it, ended up becoming a source of disappointment for the protesters, many expressed their dissatisfaction on social media. Even great leaders of the movement such as "Zé Trovão" who was being sought after by anti-democratic attacks on the STF, ended up withdrawing from the movement, and he even fled to Mexico to avoid his arrest in national territory

The comedian Marcelo Adnet made a video where he imitated the audio of then president Jair Bolsonaro with a sarcastic tone. The video quickly went viral and divided opinions even within Jair Bolsonaro support groups, while many declared "it's another shovel of dirt in the president's grave" others decided to try to attack the same on social media.

Truck drivers who joined the strike were also receiving financial aid for food, they informed that the money was being sent by the agribusiness sector, mainly from soy that is supporting the pro-Bolsonaro demonstration.

The distribution of money during demonstrations in favor of the Bolsonaro government was one of the agendas raised after the end of the demonstrations, considering that in videos passengers of a chartered bus receiving 100 reals as "food aid" and a T-shirt by organizers were recorded. of one of the movements heading towards Brasília

The Supreme Federal Court, one of the main victims of anti-democratic acts, made a statement that was attended by all ministers through a note that was read by the minister Luiz Fux:

This Supreme Court will never accept threats to its independence or intimidation to the regular exercise of its functions. No one will close this Court. We will keep it standing, with sweat and perseverance… If contempt for judicial decisions occurs at the initiative of the head of any of the powers, this attitude, in addition to representing an attack on democracy, constitutes a crime of responsibility, to be analyzed by the National Congress.

— Luiz Fux, Supreme Federal Court

The Brazilian Chamber of Deputies made its note through the federal deputy Arthur Lira, who is known for being a supporter of then president Jair Bolsonaro, criticized the position of his colleague from executive, in a note he said:

Our House is committed to the real Brazil – which has been suffering from the pandemic, unemployment and lack of opportunities. In the Chamber of Deputies, we approved emergency aid and voted on laws that made access to vaccination easier, We advanced in legislation that allows the creation of more jobs and more income. Casa do Povo went ahead with Brazil's agenda – especially the reforms. We never miss Brazilians. The Chamber has not stopped in the face of crises that only make Brazil waste time, lose lives and lose opportunities to progress, to be fairer and to build a better nation for all... The Powers have delimitations – the square, which must circumscribe their range of action. This defines respect and harmony. I cannot admit questions about decisions taken and overcome – such as the printed vote. Once defined, the page is turned. Just as I will also continue defending the right of parliamentarians to free expression – and our prerogative to punish them internally if the House, with its sovereignty and independence, understands that they have crossed the line.

— Arthur Lira

The president of the National Congress Rodrigo Pacheco also spoke about the acts on 7 September. Without citing President Jair Bolsonaro, Pacheco criticized what he called "undemocratic raptures."

On this 7th of September, many Brazilians took to the streets. Thousands more did not go, and there is a common point among all Brazilians. We live in a country in crisis.

A real crisis of hunger and poverty that knocks at the door of Brazilians, sacrificing people's dignity. Inflation, with the loss of Brazilian purchasing power, things are more expensive. The unemployment crisis, the energy crisis, the water crisis. A pandemic that saddened the country a lot. So, a real crisis that we are experiencing and that we have to solve. This solution does not lie in authoritarianism. It is not about undemocratic raptures, it is not about questioning democracy. This solution lies in the political maturity of the constituted powers to understand each other, to seek convergences for what truly interests Brazilians.

That's why it's fundamental and we must work hard, because the powers that be sit at the table, organize themselves, respect each other. Each one fulfills its role respecting the role of the other and seeks a harmony that will mean solving people's problems.

— Rodrigo Pacheco

On 12 September, a small protest supporting Bolsonaro was held in Brasília, but with a much lower participation rate, the protesters called for the impeachment of Supreme Federal Tribunal minister Alexandre de Moraes and for the stay of Bolsonaro's presidency.

==== October ====
Pro-Government protests also happened in Rome on the 30th, the president met with the supporters in the city, and, journalists trying to interview the president were punched, pushed, and had their cellphones robbed by the president's guards, a journalist was also pushed by pro-government protesters, after being called an "infiltrator" by the protesters, Italian guards and cops also responded to journalists with violence, pushing them away from the building where the president was meeting with other world leaders.

==== November ====
On 1 November, protests supporting the president happened in Anguillara, about 20 people participated in the protest, that, as an accident, mixed with anti-government protesters, pro and anti-government protesters then verbally clashed, on one occasion, during an interview with a pro-government protester, an elderly man approached the woman and said "go back to Brazil if you love the president so much". Supporters of the president began arriving en masse around 11:00 a.m. Singing the national anthem and dressed in shirts of the Brazil national team, they spread throughout the city. They gathered in front of the town hall and then moved to Villa Arca del Santo, where the president received the title of Honorary Citizen. Bolsonaro arrived at the scene around 12:20 p.m. After clashes between protesters and journalists, the president quickly left the scene to greet supporters, who shouted "myth." Amid the confusion, a woman was heard shouting "genocidal."

==== December ====
During an audience about the COVID-19 passport on the 14th, people began protesting against its compulsory use, Deputy Talita, Singer Netinho, medic Raissa Soares and Capitão Alden were also present in the act, they also criticized the government of Governor Rui Costa (PT) calling him a "dictator" after he made it obligatory for public officials to take the vaccine.

== Outcomes ==
=== Parliamentary Committee of Enquiry at the Senate ===
On 3 February, Senator Randolfe Rodrigues said he got the needed signatures to start a Parliamentary Committee of Enquiry at the Federal Senate ('Comissão Parlamentar de Inquérito, abbreviated as 'CPI', in Portuguese - The needed signatures are 27, accordingly to the Constitution's Article 58, § 3rd) to investigate Bolsonaro's handling of the pandemic. Besides that, nothing happened until Supreme Federal Court's minister Luís Roberto Barroso, on 8 April, forced the Senate to create Randolfe's CPI, created on 13 April. In parallel, Ceará's Senator Eduardo Girão, on 2 March, started to collect signatures to create a Commission to investigate corruption scandals involving states and municipalities, which caught the media's attention after many Federal Police's operations, known as "Covidão" (Big Covid, in Portuguese). It is estimated that R$260 million (US$50.8 million as of 12 June 2021) were diverted. Girão got the needed signatures on 12 April, when his commission proposal had 33 signatures.

==== Members of the Commission ====
- President: Senator Omar Aziz (PSD-AM)
- Vice-president: Senator Randolfe Rodrigues (REDE-AP)
- Rapporteur: Senator Renan Calheiros (MDB-AL)
- Others: Senator Eduardo Braga, Senator Eduardo Girão, Senator Tasso Jereissati, Senator Humberto Costa, Senator Marcos Rogério, Senator Jorginho Mello, Senator Otto Alencar, Senator Ciro Nogueira
- Substitutes: Senator Jader Barbalho, Senator Angelo Coronel, Senator Marcos do Val, Senator Rogério Carvalho, Senator Alessandro Vieira, Senator Luis Carlos Heinze, Senator Zequinha Marinho.

Renan Calheiros was initially blocked by Justice from being part of the commission, when judge Charles Renaud Frazão de Morais agreed with Federal Deputy Carla Zambelli, but he still became the rapporteur. Calheiros is father of Alagoas' governor, Renan Calheiros Filho, reason why the lawyer Hazenclever Lopes Cançado wanted to block him and Senator Jader Barbalho (father of Helder Barbalho, Pará's governor) from participating at the commission. Calheiros also declared himself partial to being rapporteur at the commission, in matters involving the State of Alagoas, on his Twitter account.

==== Interviews ====
Name	Date(s)	Position	Heard as	Note
Luiz Henrique Mandetta	4 May	Former Health Minister between January 1, 2019, and April 16, 2020	Witness	
Nelson Teich	5 May	Former Health Minister between April 17 and 15 May 2020	Witness	
Marcelo Queiroga	6 May, 8 June	Health Minister since March 23	Witness	
Antônio Barra Torres	11 May	Director-President of ANVISA	Witness	
Fábio Wajngarten	12 May	Former Communication Secretary	Witness	
Carlos Murillo	13 May	Pfizer's Regional President for Latin America	Witness	
Ernesto Araújo	18 May	Former Foreign Affairs Minister	Witness	
Eduardo Pazuello	19–20 May	Former Health Minister between June 2, 2020, and March 23, 2021	Witness	
Mayra Pinheiro	25 May	Work and Education Management Secretary of the Ministry of Health	Witness	
Dimas Covas	27 May	Butantan Institute's director	Witness	
Nise Yamaguchi	1 June	Immunologist and Oncologist	Invited	
Luana Araújo	2 June	former Extraordinary Covid Secretary	Invited	
Élcio Franco	9 June	former Executive Secretary of the Health Ministry	Witness	
Wilson Lima	10 June	Governor of the State of Amazonas	Invited	Governor got an habeas corpus from Supreme Federal Court's Justice Rosa Weber and did not went to Brasília to be interviewed. The Commission decided to appeal Weber's decision. Interview did not happen.
Natalia Pasternak	11 June	Microbiologist	Invited	
Claudio Maierovitch	11 June	Sanitary Doctor	Invited	
Helder Barbalho	29 June	Governor of the State of Pará	Invited	planned; STF forced CPI to invite governors, not convoke them. Interview did not happen.
Wellington Dias	30 June	Governor of the State of Piauí	Invited	planned; STF forced CPI to invite governors, not convoke them. Interview did not happen.
Ibaneis Rocha	1 July	Governor of the Federal District	Invited	planned; STF forced CPI to invite governors, not convoke them. Interview did not happen.
Mauro Carlesse	2 July	Governor of the State of Tocantins	Invited	planned; STF forced CPI to invite governors, not convoke them. Interview did not happen.
Carlos Moisés	6 July	Governor of the State of Santa Catarina	Invited	planned; STF forced CPI to invite governors, not convoke them. Interview did not happen.
Antônio Denarium	7 July	Governor of the State of Roraima	Invited	planned; STF forced CPI to invite governors, not convoke them. Interview did not happen.
Waldez Góes	8 July	Governor of the State of Amapá	Invited	planned

=== December 2023: marco temporal enshrined in law ===
Despite earlier legal wrangling over the matter, in December 2023 the predominantly right wing Brazilian Congress voted to enact a law upholding the marco temporal, thus curbing indigenous land rights.

== See also ==
- 2015-2016 protests in Brazil
- Jair Bolsonaro
- 2013 Brazilian protests
- COVID-19 pandemic
- COVID-19 misinformation
- 2021 Brazilian military crisis
- Protest
- COVID-19 CPI
- Ele Não movement
- 2020 Brazilian protests
- Protests over responses to the COVID-19 pandemic
- List of protests in the 21st century
