= Júnior Tércio =

Brazilian politician (born 1986)

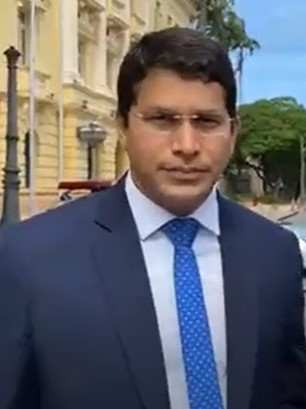
- Tércio in 2021

Member of the Legislative Assembly of Pernambuco
- Incumbent
- Assumed office 1 February 2023

Personal details
- Born: 14 April 1986 (age 40)
- Party: Progressistas (since 2022)
- Spouse: Clarissa Tércio

José Ivanildo de Moura Júnior (born 14 April 1986), better known as Júnior Tércio, is a Brazilian politician serving as a member of the Legislative Assembly of Pernambuco since 2023. He is married to Clarissa Tércio.
