= Priscila Costa =

Brazilian politician (born 1984)

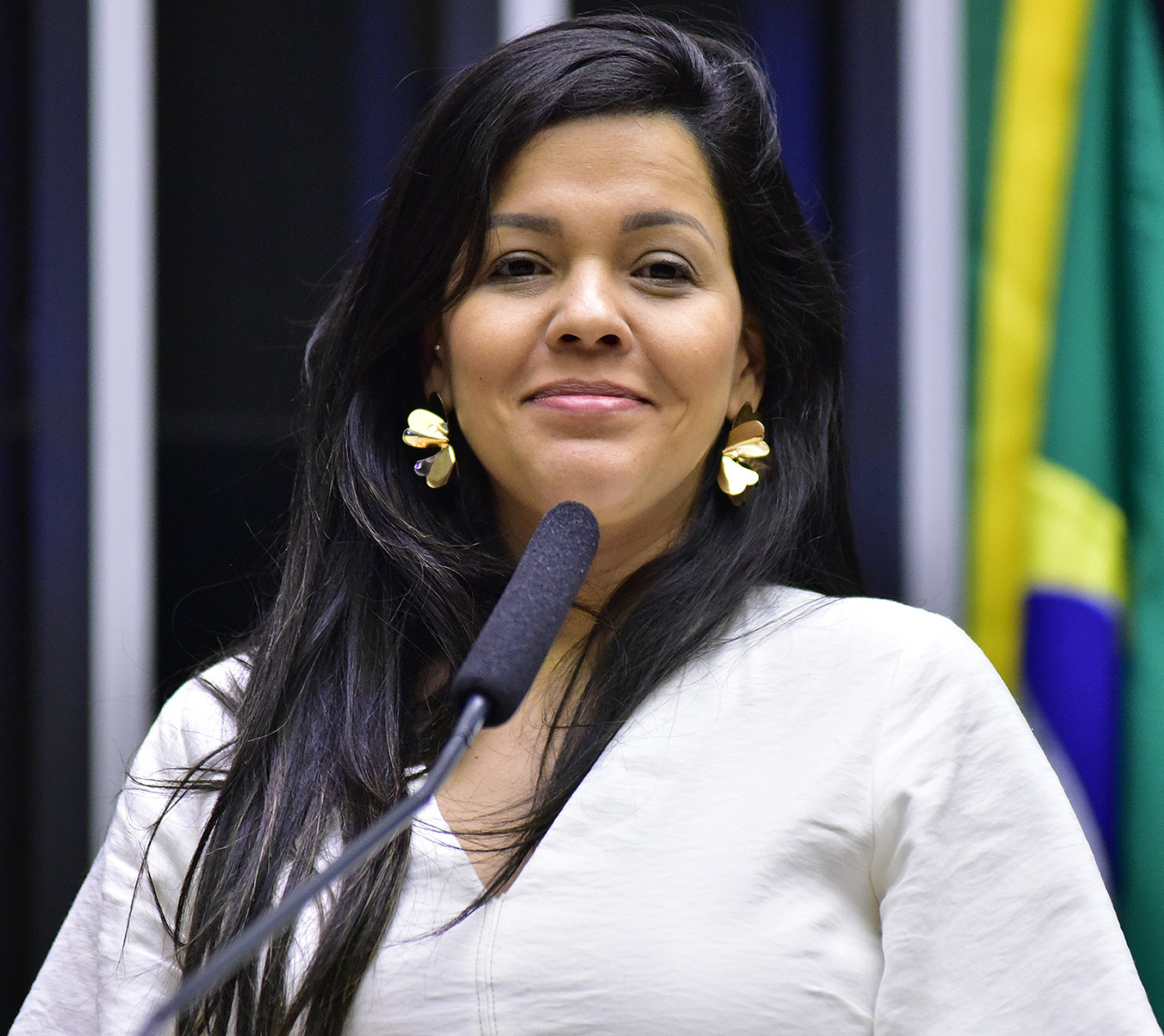
- Costa in 2023

Member of the Chamber of Deputies
- In office 30 June 2023 – 27 October 2023
- Preceded by: Yury do Paredão
- Succeeded by: Yury do Paredão
- Constituency: Ceará

Personal details
- Born: 12 September 1984 (age 42)
- Party: Liberal Party (since 2022)

Priscila Bezerra da Costa (born 12 September 1984) is a Brazilian politician serving as vice president of the Liberal Party's women's wing since 2025. From June to October 2023, she was a member of the Chamber of Deputies.
