= Capitão Alden =

Brazilian politician (born 1980)

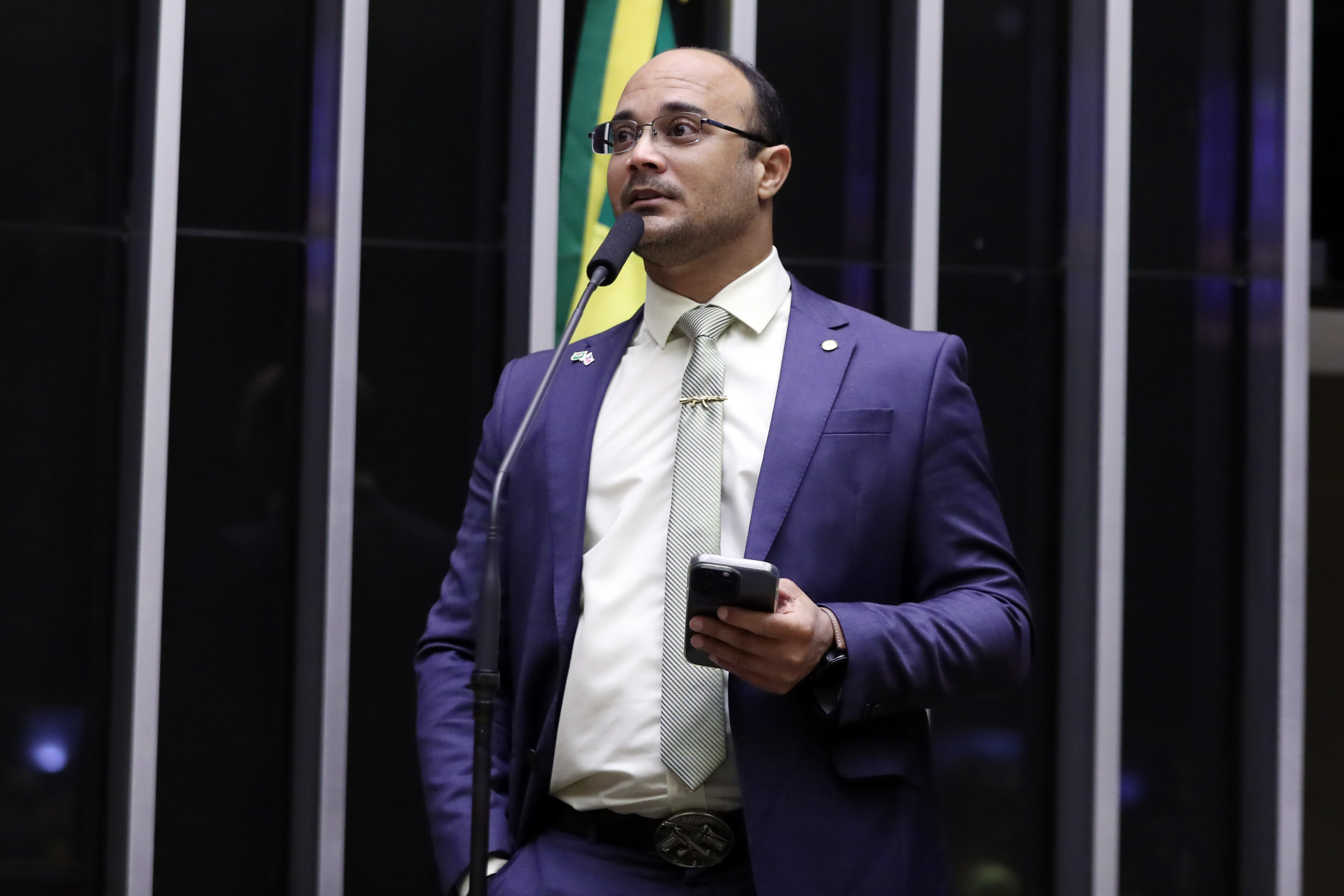
- Alden in 2023

Member of the Chamber of Deputies
- Incumbent
- Assumed office 1 February 2023
- Constituency: Bahia

Member of the Legislative Assembly of Bahia
- In office 1 February 2019 – 1 February 2023
- Constituency: At-large

Personal details
- Born: Alden José Lázaro da Silva; 19 April 1980 (age 46) Salvador, Bahia, Brazil
- Party: PL (since 2022)
- Other political affiliations: PSL (2018–2022)

Military service
- Allegiance: Military Police of Bahia State
- Rank: Captain

Alden José Lázaro da Silva (born 19 April 1980), better known as Capitão Alden, is a Brazilian politician who has served as a member of the Chamber of Deputies since 2023. From 2019 to 2023, he was a member of the Legislative Assembly of Bahia.

== Electoral results ==
Year	Election	Position	Party	Votes	%	Resultat
2018	State of Bahia	State deputy	PSL	39.732	0.57%	Elected
2022	State of Bahia	Federal deputy	PL	95.151	1.20%	Elected
