= Zé Trovão =

Brazilian politician (born 1988)

- Trovão in 2023

Member of the Chamber of Deputies
- Incumbent
- Assumed office 1 February 2023
- Constituency: Santa Catarina

Personal details
- Born: Marcos Antônio Pereira Gomes; 22 July 1988 (age 38) São Paulo, Brazil
- Party: PL (since 2022)
- Other political affiliations: PTB (2022)
- Profession: Truck driver

Marcos Antônio Pereira Gomes (born 22 July 1988), better known as Zé Trovão, is a Brazilian politician serving as a member of the Chamber of Deputies since 2023. He previously worked as a truck driver and was one of the leaders of the 2021 truckers' strike.
