= Delegado Caveira =

Brazilian politician (born 1979)

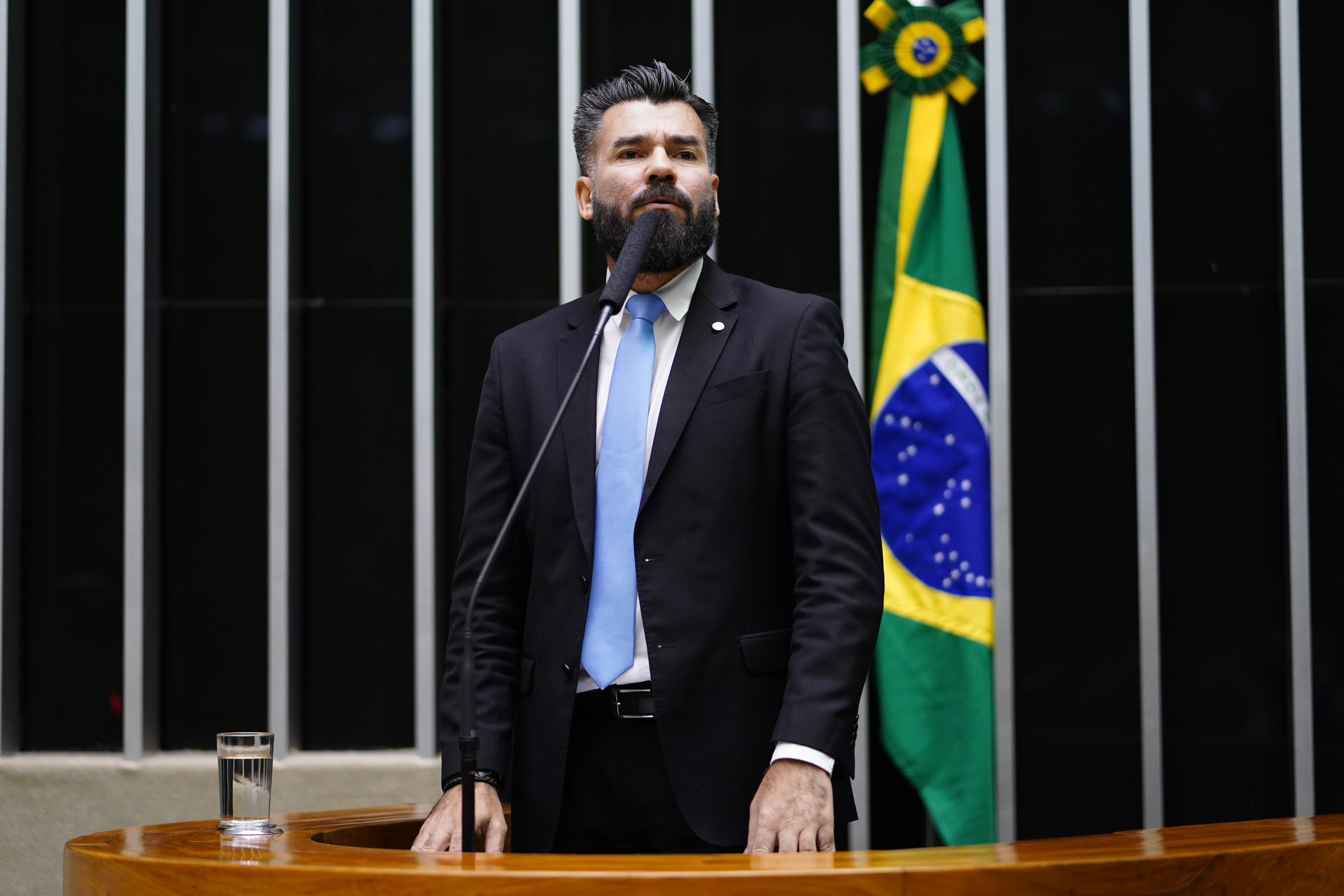
- Caveira in 2023

Member of the Chamber of Deputies
- Incumbent
- Assumed office 1 February 2023
- Constituency: Pará

Personal details
- Born: 27 April 1979 (age 47)
- Party: Liberal Party (since 2022)

Lenildo Mendes dos Santos Sertão (born 27 April 1979), better known as Delegado Caveira, is a Brazilian politician serving as a member of the Chamber of Deputies since 2023. From 2019 to 2023, he was a member of the Legislative Assembly of Pará.
