= Clarissa Tércio =

Brazilian politician (born 1984)

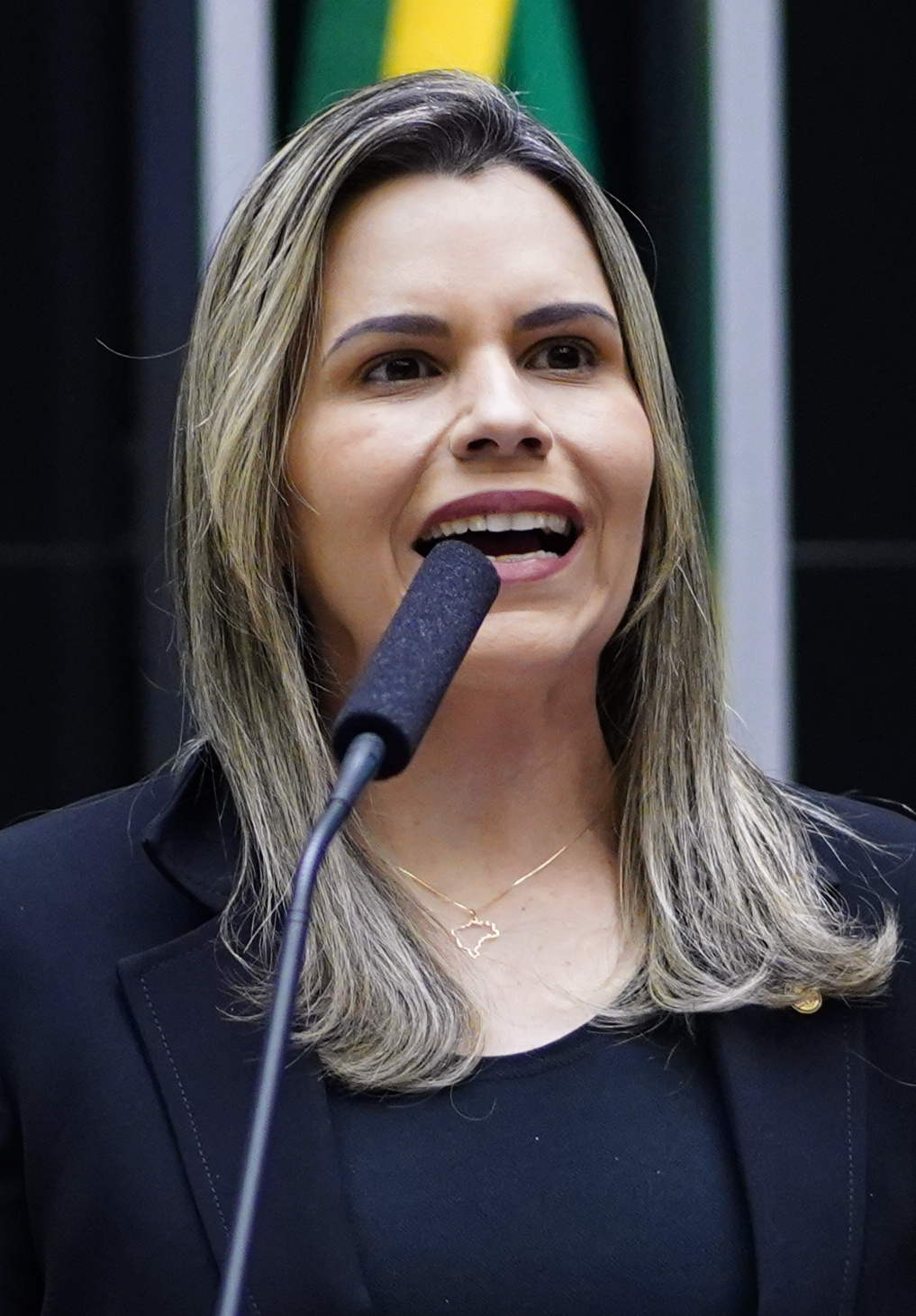
- Tércio in 2023

Member of the Chamber of Deputies
- Incumbent
- Assumed office 1 February 2023
- Constituency: Pernambuco

Personal details
- Born: 26 December 1984 (age 41)
- Party: Progressistas (since 2022)
- Spouse: Júnior Tércio

Erica Clarissa Borba Cordeiro de Moura (born 26 December 1984), better known as Clarissa Tércio, is a Brazilian politician serving as a member of the Chamber of Deputies since 2023. From 2019 to 2023, she was a member of the Legislative Assembly of Pernambuco.
