= Movimento Vem pra Rua =

Brazilian sociopolitical movement

Movement Come to the Streets
- Movimento Vem pra Rua
- Abbreviation: MVPR
- Founded: October 2014
- Type: Political Movement
- Purpose: Combat against corruption
- Headquarters: São Paulo, Brazil
- Region served: Brazil
- Website: http://www.vemprarua.net/

The Movement Come to the Streets is a Brazilian sociopolitical movement founded in October 2014. The movement emerged in October 2014 as an attempt to organize and unite people in the face of the 2014 Brazilian economic crisis during the Dilma Rousseff government. The movement focused on the government of the former president, the fight against corruption, the impeachment of Dilma Rousseff and the approval of the 10 Measures against Corruption, a bill of the Federal Public Ministry.

== Participation in Dilma Rousseff's impeachment process ==
As of April 2015, the Movimento Vem Pra Rua started to support the impeachment of President Dilma Rousseff.

In 2015 and 2016, Vem Pra Rua and other civil society movements organized demonstrations throughout Brazil against corruption, the Workers' Party (Brazil) and Dilma Rousseff's government.

The March 15, 2015 protest was considered the largest popular mobilization in the country since the beginning of the New Republic. On March 13, 2016, the protests surpassed the previous number, with 6.7 million people on the streets of every state in the country and in the Federal District, according to the organizers. The Military Police claimed that 3.3 million people were present. It was considered the biggest protest in the country's history.

The March 13 protests continued spontaneously between March 16 and March 22. On March 17 in the states of Acre, Alagoas, Manaus, Amapá, Bahia, Ceará, Federal District, Espírito Santo, Goiás, Maranhão, Minas Gerais, Mato Grosso do Sul, Mato Grosso, Pará, Paraíba, Pernambuco, Paraná, Rio de Janeiro, Rio Grande do Norte, Rio Grande do Sul, Rondônia, Roraima, Santa Catarina, Sergipe, São Paulo and Tocantins had protesters against the government, after President Dilma named Lula as minister of the Casa Civil.

There were also records of Cacerolazos during Lula's inauguration at the Palácio do Planalto, which was later suspended by the courts.

In 2016, the movement created a tool on its website, called "Map of the Impeachment", to facilitate contact between citizens in favor of the impeachment of Rouseff and the federal deputies, and a panel that displayed the position of each deputy on the process.

== Positions ==
The Movement declared itself in favor of the impeachment of Dilma Rousseff and against corruption, military intervention and the coup d'état, separatism and authoritarian governments.

During the COVID-19 pandemic in Brazil, the movement took a stance to pressure parliamentarians to use electoral fund money to fight disease in the country.

== Movement creation ==
Within the action of this movement, the "impeachment map" was created, which was a tool that made available the position of parliamentarians on the impeachment vote. In addition, it created the Wall of Shame, a panel inaugurated by the movement in São Paulo to show the position of federal deputies in relation to the impeachment of Dilma Rousseff.

In 2019, the movement created a similar tool, the "second instance map" which demonstrates the position of parliamentarians in relation to the PEC that allows those sentenced in second instance to start serving their sentences immediately.

== Controversies ==
=== Financing ===
The movement has been repeatedly criticized for its lack of clarity about the source of its funding, who its donors are, and the amounts of donations. However, the movement itself claims to come from voluntary donations, and have no links with political parties.

The foundation is controlled by businessman Jorge Paulo Lemann, a partner at the brewery Ambev and the fast food chain Burger King. A BBC Brasil team had access to the registration site vemprarua.org.br, official URL used by the movement in the elections, and revealed that the domain was purchased by the Foundation Studying. At the end of 2014, the website was deleted and Vem Pra Rua changed its online address. In a statement, Fundação Estudar called itself "non-partisan" and attributed the case to an "isolated initiative" of a former employee.

=== Confidential member ID ===
In December 2014, in an interview with Estadão, one of the founders, Rogério Checker, comments on the fact that the identity of the co-founder who goes by Collin Butterfield is kept confidential, under the allegation that the person does not want expose itself, because it deals with companies.

=== Nonpartisanship ===
The movement declares to defend the non-partisan cause of fighting corruption and the imprisonment of corrupt persons, regardless of the party, and supports the Lava Jato in its actions. Prior to the Impeachment, the group's actions targeted the Workers' Party and the Dilma Rousseff government. After the removal of Dilma Rousseff and the inauguration of Michel Temer, Vem Pra Rua was criticized for its discreet reaction to the various allegations of corruption involving the highest levels of the provisional government. The movement claimed, at the time, that it chose to give the "benefit of the doubt" to the new government, however supported the departure of Temer government ministers involved in Lava Jato.

After the Bolsonaro government takes office in 2019, the movement maintained its non-partisan posture, supporting Lava Jato, and the fight against corruption, especially after the change in the understanding of the STF in relation to second instance arrest, which supposedly generated a setback in the fight against corruption and impunity in the country, causing the movement to once again call demonstrations throughout the country.

=== Political Member ===
In March 2015 a video from 2013 was released where the leader of Vem Pra Rua in the state of Espírito Santo, Armando Fontoura, hits the time and leaves without working. He was, at the time of the video, an employee of Councilor Luiz Emanuel (PSDB) at the municipal council of Vitória, and was exonerated after the fraud was revealed. At the time the video was released, in addition to being the leader of the movement, he was also the general secretary of the PSDB in the city. This fact caught the attention of the movement to defend the flag against corruption.

=== Public agent intimidation ===
In May 2015, a video was released in which law professor Henrique Quintanilha, one of the leaders of Vem Pra Rua in Bahia, intimidates traffic agents who fined him for parking in a space reserved for the physically handicapped and the elderly. In the video, Quintanilha uses card and influence peddling with the mayor of Salvador ACM Neto to intimidate the agents of Transalvador to cancel the fine. Quintanilha is known for his militancy in Vem Pra Rua and in the fight against corruption, which led to criticism regarding his stance in the episode.

=== Quote in the "Vaza Jato" ===
In the Vaza Jato archive, published by The Intercept, it is pointed out that Deltan Dallagnol used political groups to be one of his personal spokespersons. One of those mentioned is the Movimento Vem Pra Rua.
