= Yury do Paredão =

Brazilian politician (born 1988)

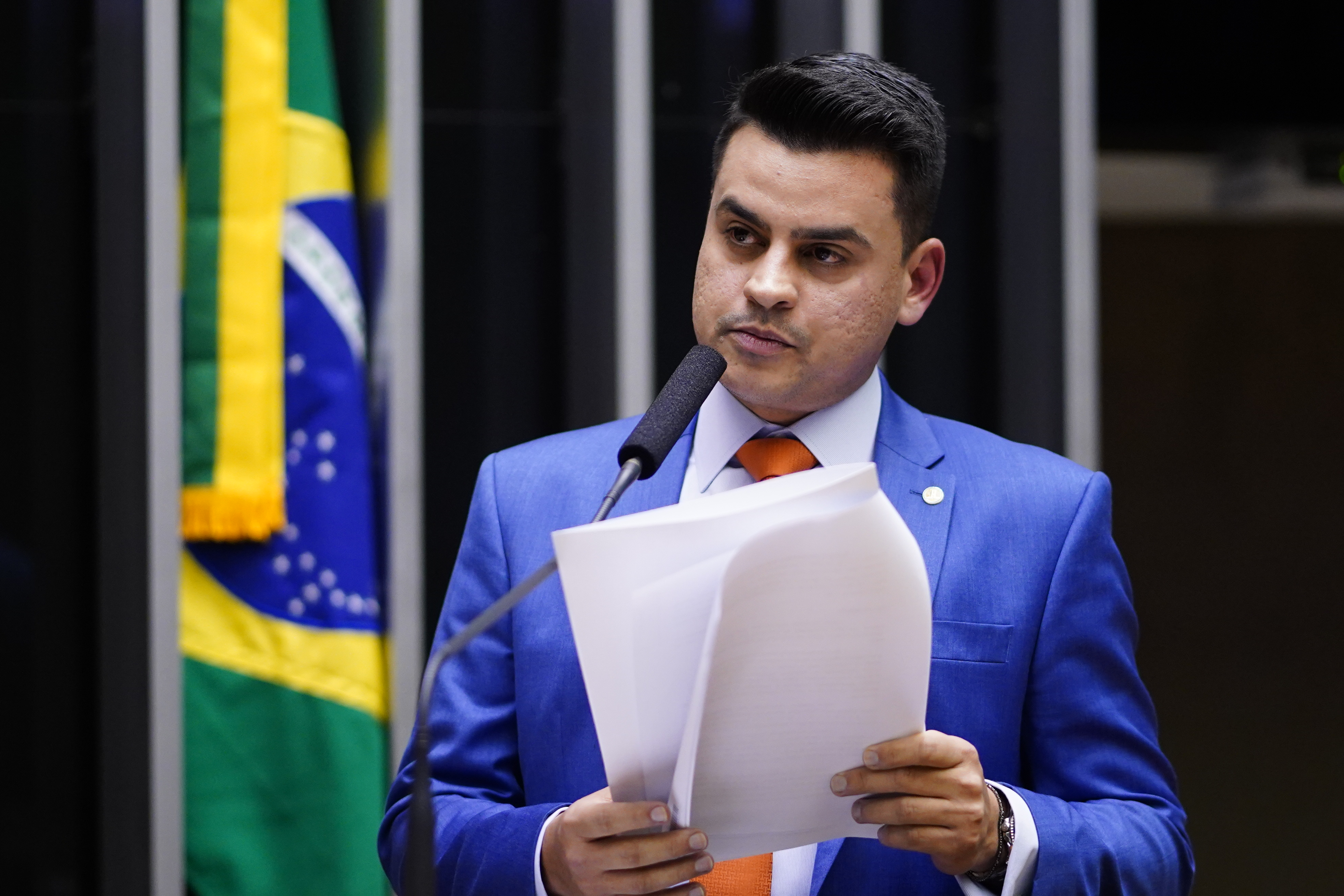

Member of the Chamber of Deputies
- Incumbent
- Assumed office 1 February 2023
- Constituency: Ceará

Personal details
- Born: Yury Bruno de Alencar Araújo; 31 May 1988 (age 38) Juazeiro do Norte, Ceará, Brazil
- Party: MDB (since 2023)
- Other political affiliations: PTB (2015–2019); PT (2019–2021); PL (2021–2023)

Yury Bruno de Alencar Araújo, better known as Yury do Paredão (born 31 May 1988), is a Brazilian politician serving as a member of the Chamber of Deputies since 2023. He has served as chairman of the urban development committee since 2025.
