= Politics of Pernambuco =

- Legislative Branch: Constitution of 1989
- Voters: 7,018,098 (2022)
- Last state elections: 2022

Executive Branch
- Governor: Raquel Lyra (PSDB)
- Vice Governor: Priscila Krause (Cidadania)
- Government headquarters: Campo das Princesas Palace
- Government website: www.pe.gov.br

Legislative Branch
- Parliament: Legislative Assembly of Pernambuco: 49 state deputies; 19th legislature

Federal Parliamentary Representation
- Federal Senate of Brazil: 3 senators: Humberto Costa (PT); Jarbas Vasconcelos (MDB); Teresa Leitão (PT)
- Chamber of Deputies of Brazil: 25 Federal Deputies

The politics of Pernambuco is the direction of Pernambuco's territory and the determination of the powers that make up its government structure. It is governed by three branches, the executive, the legislative, and the judiciary, and its current constitution was enacted on October 5, 1989; the first constitution was enacted in 1891 and after that there were three others.

The executive power has as central figures the governor, who is elected to office by direct vote and has a four-year term with the right to one reelection and a vice-governor, the latter taking over the functions of the former when it's unable to exercise them for any reason; currently the positions are held by Raquel Lyra (PSDB) and Priscila Krause (Cidadania). The legislative branch is represented by the Legislative Assembly of Pernambuco (Assembleia Legislativa de Pernambuco - Alepe), which has 49 state deputies, elected every four years, whose main function is to analyze and vote on bills at the state level; the current president of Alepe is Eriberto Medeiros. The judiciary is represented by the Court of Justice of Pernambuco (Tribunal de Justiça de Pernambuco - TJPE), and its main function is to make judgments based on state laws. The court has 52 judges and is currently presided over by Adalberto de Oliveira Melo.

The symbols that represent Pernambuco are the flag, the coat of arms, and the anthem; and they symbolize its history and identity. The flag was based on the one utilized during the Pernambucan Revolution of 1817, in which the Pernambucans fought for the state's independence from the Portuguese Crown. The coat of arms has in its symbolism several elements that can be related to the history of Pernambuco, and the anthem is an exaltation of the conquests and the past of the Pernambucan people.

== History ==
=== First years ===
Coat of Arms of the Captaincy of Pernambuco.

At the beginning of Brazil's colonization in 1530, King John III of Portugal (r. 1521–1557) divided the territory into hereditary captaincies The first donee of the Captaincy of Pernambuco was Duarte Coelho, who took possession of it in 1535 and named it "Nova Lusitânia" It became the richest in Brazil, due to the production of sugarcane, and was also the state responsible for more than half of Brazil's sugarcane exports. Speaking about the center of the colonial economy, Father Fernão Cardim said that "in Pernambuco one finds more vanity than in Lisbon", an opulence that seemed to derive, as suggested by Gabriel Soares de Sousa in 1587, from the fact that, at the time, the captaincy was "so powerful (...) that there are more than one hundred men in it who have from 1,000 to 5,000 cruzados of income, and some from 8,000 to 10,000 cruzados. From this land many rich men came out to these kingdoms that were very poor". Around the beginning of the 17th century, the Capitaincy of Pernambuco was the largest and richest sugar-producing area in the world.

During the Dutch invasions in Brazil (1630–1654), the city of Recife (Mauritsstad) was the capital of the Dutch possessions in Portuguese America, called New Holland. When Count Maurice of Nassau, administrator of the Dutch domains, landed in New Holland on January 23, 1637, he was with artists and intellectuals such as the painter Frans Post and the humanist Elias Herckmans, along with 350 soldiers. Nassau's government in Pernambuco had as its main actions the investments in the infrastructure of Recife, the establishment of the political alliance with the sugarmill lords by increasing the sugar production and the reducing the taxes levied on them, establishing religious freedom. After the end of Maurice's government in 1644, the harmonious climate between the Dutch and the sugarmill lords ceased to exist, and the latter began to act to expel them, which was achieved with the Pernambuco Insurrection of 1654.

=== Revolts that occurred in Pernambuco ===
One of Pernambuco's best-known historical facts is that it has been the scene of several revolts, among which the most prominent are the Mascate War (1710–1711), the Pernambuco Revolution (1817), the Confederation of the Equator (1824).

==== Mascate War ====
After the Dutch invasion, many merchants from Portugal - pejoratively called "mascates" - settled in Recife, bringing prosperity to the town. Its development was viewed with suspicion by the Olindenses, largely economically struggling sugarmill lords. As Recife, at the time subordinate to Olinda, grew in importance, the merchants began to claim their political-administrative autonomy, seeking to free themselves from Olinda and the authority of its City Council.

In 1709, Recife officially became independent from Olinda, which left the sugarmill landlords unhappy. After many fights between the Olindenses and Recifenses, the ruler Félix José de Mendonça became responsible for putting an end to this conflict, and did so in 1711, when he stipulated the imprisonment of all the Olindense landlords involved in the war and equalized the two cities politically. In 1714, Recife became the capital of Pernambuco.

==== Pernambucan Revolution ====
Flag of Pernambuco during the Pernambucan Revolution of 1817.

The so-called Pernambucan Revolution, also known as "Father's Revolution", was an emancipationist movement that broke out on March 6, 1817. Among its causes were the influence of the Enlightenment ideas propagated by Masonic societies, Portuguese monarchical absolutism, and the enormous expenses of the royal family and its entourage newly arrived in Brazil. The Pernambuco government was obliged to send to Rio de Janeiro large sums of money to fund salaries, food, clothing, and court parties, which made it difficult to face local problems (such as the drought that occurred in 1816), generating great discontent among the Pernambucan and Brazilian people. In addition to Pernambuco, the Revolution was joined by the states of Paraíba and Rio Grande do Norte, each of which got a star on the flag of the revolution.

Even though it lasted only 74 days, the Pernambucan Revolution was the only emancipationist movement of the period of Portuguese domination that went beyond the conspiratorial phase and reached the revolutionary process of seizing power. The Pernambucan Revolution left a strong legacy in the history of Pernambuco, being a movement that marks the identity of the state, one of the main proofs of this being its current flag.

==== Confederation of the Equator ====
The Confederation of the Equator was a revolutionary movement, of emancipationist and republican nature, which represented the main reaction against the absolutist tendency and the centralizing policy of Pedro I's government (r. 1822–1831), outlined in the Constitution of 1824, Brazil's first constitution. Pernambuco did not accept it, and Manuel de Carvalho Pais de Andrade, president of the province, proclaimed the Confederation of the Equator, which united Pernambuco, Ceará and Rio Grande do Norte. The central objective was the creation of a sovereign state separate from the empire, with sovereignty and autonomy of the confederated provinces. The movement also included the participation of Cipriano Barata and had as its best-known figure Frei Caneca.

The central government, in Rio de Janeiro, carefully watched the development of the revolt and prepared from the beginning the repression. To this end, military force was used, organized and led by Brigadier Francisco de Lima e Silva, who headed the land forces, and Thomas Cochrane, an English mercenary who structured and commanded the naval offensive. In 1824, the rebels were arrested and Frei Caneca was sentenced to hang. However, faced with the executioner's refusal to carry out the sentence, he was eventually shot. Many other rebels received the same penalty, while a few others fled.

==== Recent history ====
In the early years of the Brazilian Republic, Recife was still a very influential city: it was second in political-economic importance only to Rio de Janeiro. On July 26, 1930, the lawyer and politician João Pessoa, who had been that year a candidate for vice president on the ticket headed by Getúlio Vargas, was assassinated by João Duarte Dantas at the Glória Confectionery in Nova Street, downtown Recife. The crime was one of the triggers of the Revolution of 1930.

In 1966, there was a terrorist attack on General Arthur da Costa e Silva, candidate to the presidency of the republic, while he was landing at Guararapes Airport. There were dead and wounded, but the future president escaped, arriving in Recife by car from João Pessoa. As this was one of the main centers of action of the Military Regime, it was in the metropolis of Pernambuco that the "Diretas Já" movement began in 1983, which expanded throughout the country and was responsible for hastening the end of the dictatorship in Brazil.

== Constitution ==
The current Constitution of Pernambuco was enacted, later increased by changes resulting from constitutional amendments, on October 5, 1989, by the state constituent assembly. The first constitution was enacted on June 17, 1891, and after it three more (not counting the current one) were enacted in 1935, 1947, and 1967.

The president of the state constituent assembly was João Ferreira Lima Filho and the rapporteur of the constitution was Marcus Antonio Soares da Cunha. Other notable people who participated in the drafting of the constitution include: former governor and former minister of education Mendonça Filho, former president of the Chamber of Deputies Severino Cavalcanti, and João Lyra Filho, who is the father of former governor João Lyra Neto and grandfather of the current governor, Raquel Lyra.

On November 20, 2014, in commemoration of the 25th anniversary of Pernambuco's constitution, Alepe honored with medals the deputies who were part of the constituent assembly and two public servants who participated in the drafting of the document. The commendation of the tribute was created through Resolution No. 1,268, October 8, 2014; the commission responsible for organizing the solemnity was chaired by André Campos, and included the participation of Raquel Lyra (Note: Raquel Lyra also represented her grandfather, João Lyra Filho, at the event and received the medal in his name, as he had already passed away.) and Tony Gel.

== Government structure ==
=== Executive ===
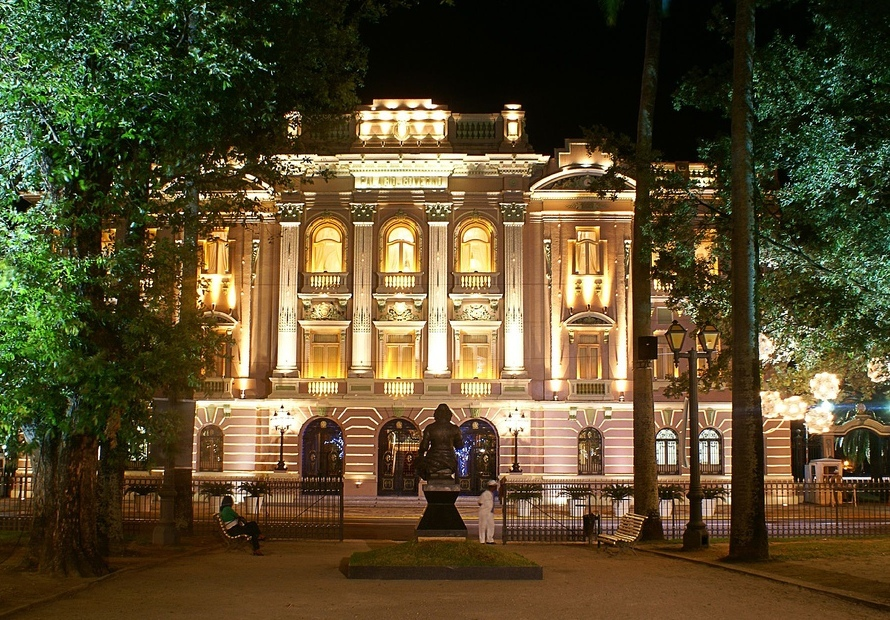
Campo das Princesas Palace, headquarters of Pernambuco's executive power.

Pernambuco's executive power has as its most important figure the governor, who is elected by the population in universal suffrage, through direct and secret ballot, every four years, and an incumbent governor can be reelected for another term.

Its headquarters, since 1841, is the Campo das Princesas Palace, located in Recife and built by the engineer Morais Âncora at the behest of the governor Francisco do Rego Barros. Idealized since 1786, the palace has this name due to a visit of the emperor Pedro II (r. 1831–1889) and his family, being initially a tribute of the people to the emperor's daughters and an expression of sympathy for the imperial family. In 1967, during the government of Nilo Coelho, and the presidency of Arthur da Costa e Silva, the palace was used as the seat of the federal government.

The governor has the following administrative functions: (Note: Chapter III, Section II - article 37)

- sanction or veto bills;
- appoint and/or dismiss secretaries, heads of state-maintained autarchies and foundations, advisors to the Court of Accounts, state attorney general, justice attorney general, chief of the Civil Police, commander of the Military Police, commander of the Military Fire Department, and general administrator of the Fernando de Noronha State District (the latter with the approval of the Legislative Assembly); (Note: Items VII, IX through XII, XIV and XVI)
- decree and execute intervention in municipalities;
- request federal intervention;
- send information on accountability, budget proposals, and any information requested by the legislative or judiciary powers;
- promote the creation of metropolitan regions;
- to summon, extraordinarily, the Legislative Assembly;
- awarding decorations and honorary distinctions.

There is also the vice-governor, who replaces the governor in case the latter resigns from his position, is removed from power, or needs to leave office temporarily. Currently, the position is held by Priscila Krause. If the positions of governor and vice-governor become vacant for any reason, the presidents of the Legislative Assembly and the Court of Justice will take office successively and a new election will be held ninety days later, except if this happens in the governor's last year in office, in which case the remaining period will complete in this way without elections. If the vacancy occurs in the penultimate year, the election will occur indirectly thirty days later. (Note: Chapter III, Section I - article 36)

Executive Branch Structure
Agency	Function	Source
Special Advisory	To advise the governor in any matter concerning the management of the public administration and in relations with officials of foreign governments.	
Military house	Execution of national and international cooperation programs and projects.	
Strategic Projects Office	Develop and manage actions to implement projects in articulation with the federal government, other states, and municipalities.	
Governor's Office	Direct and immediate support for the governor.	
Prosecutor General's Office	Exercise legal, judicial and extrajudicial representation.	
Secretariat of the Civil House	To promote the direct articulation of the executive branch with the other branches of government and with the municipalities.	
Secretariat of the State Comptroller General	Coordinate the public administration's internal control system.	
Secretariat of Finance	Develop and execute tax policy.	
Secretariat of the Women	Develop policies for women.	
Secretariat of Administration	Actions in the administrative systems of personnel management, property management, transportation and communication in the state public administration.	
Secretariat of Science, Technology and Innovation	Formulate, foster, and execute actions aimed at scientific and technological development.	
Secretariat of Culture	Cultural policy actions.	
Secretariat of Social Defense	To promote the defense of citizens' rights and social normalcy.	
Secretariat of Agrarian Development	To develop agricultural policy actions, according to the characteristics and peculiarities of each region.	
Secretariat of Economic Development	Plan, promote, and execute the economic development policy in the industrial, commercial, and service sectors.	
Secretariat of Social Development, Children and Youth, and Drug Prevention	Promote and expand social development with actions together with other public agencies and society. As of 2023, it became responsible for actions related to drug policy.	
Secretariat of Urban Development and Housing	Urban development actions and execution of the government's housing policies.	
Secretariat of Education and Sports	Policies of education and enabling cultural action.	
Secretariat of Press (currently known as the Secretariat of Communication)	Directly assisting the governor in the performance of his duties with regard to issues involving the press or the use of the media.	
Secretariat of Infrastructure and Water Resources (currently known as the Secretariat of Mobility and Infrastructure)	Formulate and execute state policies for water resources, infrastructure, sanitation and energy.	
Secretariat of Justice and Human Rights	To carry out activities related to the areas of justice, human rights, and citizenship, aiming at social development and guaranteeing the rights of all citizens, including social minorities.	
Secretariat of Environment and Sustainability	Actions related to environmental protection	
Secretariat of Planning and Management	To plan, develop, and monitor actions aimed at territorial, economic, and social development.	
Secretariat of Health	Develop health-related policies.	
Secretariat of Tourism and Leisure	To promote integrated and articulated management with the other government spheres and with the private sector for tourism development policies.	
Secretariat of Labor, Employment and Qualification (currently known as the Secretariat of Professional Development and Entrepreneurship)	Encourage entrepreneurship activities.	

=== Legislative ===
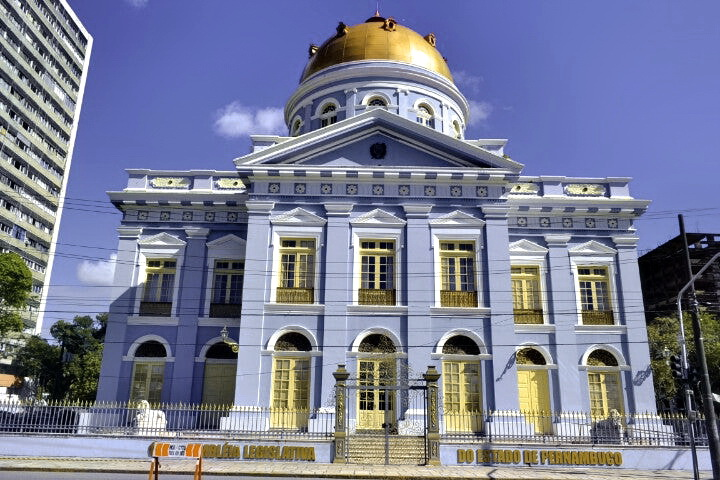
Joaquim Nabuco Palace, headquarters of the Legislative Power of Pernambuco for 142 years, is now a museum that tells the history of the Legislative Assembly of Pernambuco (Alepe).

The legislative power is unicameral and represented by the Legislative Assembly of Pernambuco (Alepe), consisting of 49 deputies, who are elected every four years, and its headquarters is located in the Boa Vista neighbourhood. In the National Congress, Pernambuco is represented by three Senators and 25 Federal Deputies. The main functions of the state deputies are to propose, analyze and vote bills. The deputies also have as responsibilities the inspection and/or investigation of the executive branch and the elaboration of the annual budget laws.

Alepe has a board of directors composed of 7 deputies, 16 standing commissions, and in some situations, parliamentarians have the right to form special commissions, of a temporary nature, to deal with specific issues or establish a Parliamentary Commission of Inquiry (Comissão Parlamentar de Inquérito - CPI). The current president of Alepe is Eriberto Medeiros (PSB).

For many years, the seat of Alepe was the Joaquim Nabuco Palace, whose name, since 1948, is a tribute to the abolitionist of the same name and founder of the Brazilian Academy of Letters (Academia Brasileira de Letras - ABL). Its construction, which had its approval by Provincial Law No. 963, was started in 1870, and its inauguration occurred on March 1, 1875. The author of the project was the engineer José Tibúrcio Pereira de Magalhães and the work was carried out by the architect José Inácio D'Ávila. After functioning as the seat of the legislative power for much of its history, the Joaquim Nabuco Palace ceased to have this function as of August 1, 2017 and became the State Legislative Museum, displaying various objects and documents that show the history of this power, the palace is now open to visits by tourists and students. The current headquarters of the state legislative power is the Governor Miguel Arraes de Alencar Building, which is named after former governor Miguel Arraes. The plenary of the new headquarters is called Governor Eduardo Campos Plenary.

=== Court of Accounts ===
The Court of Accounts of Pernambuco (Tribunal de Contas de Pernambuco - TCE-PE) has as its primary functions to assist the legislative power in the external control of the entire public administration and to supervise the application of all public money belonging to the state and municipalities. This inspection occurs in all powers and in the 184 municipalities of Pernambuco, including public entities with decentralized administration and indirect administration (autarchies, foundations, public companies and mixed economy companies). The Court of Auditors was installed on October 15, 1968, by then governor Nilo Coelho.

The TCE-PE is a collegiate body composed of a full court and two deliberative chambers that have three councilors each. The full court is the highest instance of deliberation and has seven councilors, among them the president of the Court of Accounts, who is elected to assume a two-year term; currently the position belongs to Marcos Loreto. Among its members, besides the president, the full court also has a vice president, a general ombudsman, an ombudsman, the director of the Professor Barreto Guimarães School of Public Accounts (Escola de Contas Públicas Professor Barreto Guimarães - ECPBG, created in 1998) and the presidents of the two chambers.

In the legal world, there is a national debate on the question of the autonomy of the Courts of Accounts between jurists who understand that article 71 of the 1988 Federal Constitution places a Court of Accounts as an integral body of the legislative branch and those who believe that the Courts of Accounts are independent and autonomous bodies that eventually assist it. On the official website of the TCE-PE, it is said that the body is independent.

=== Judiciary ===
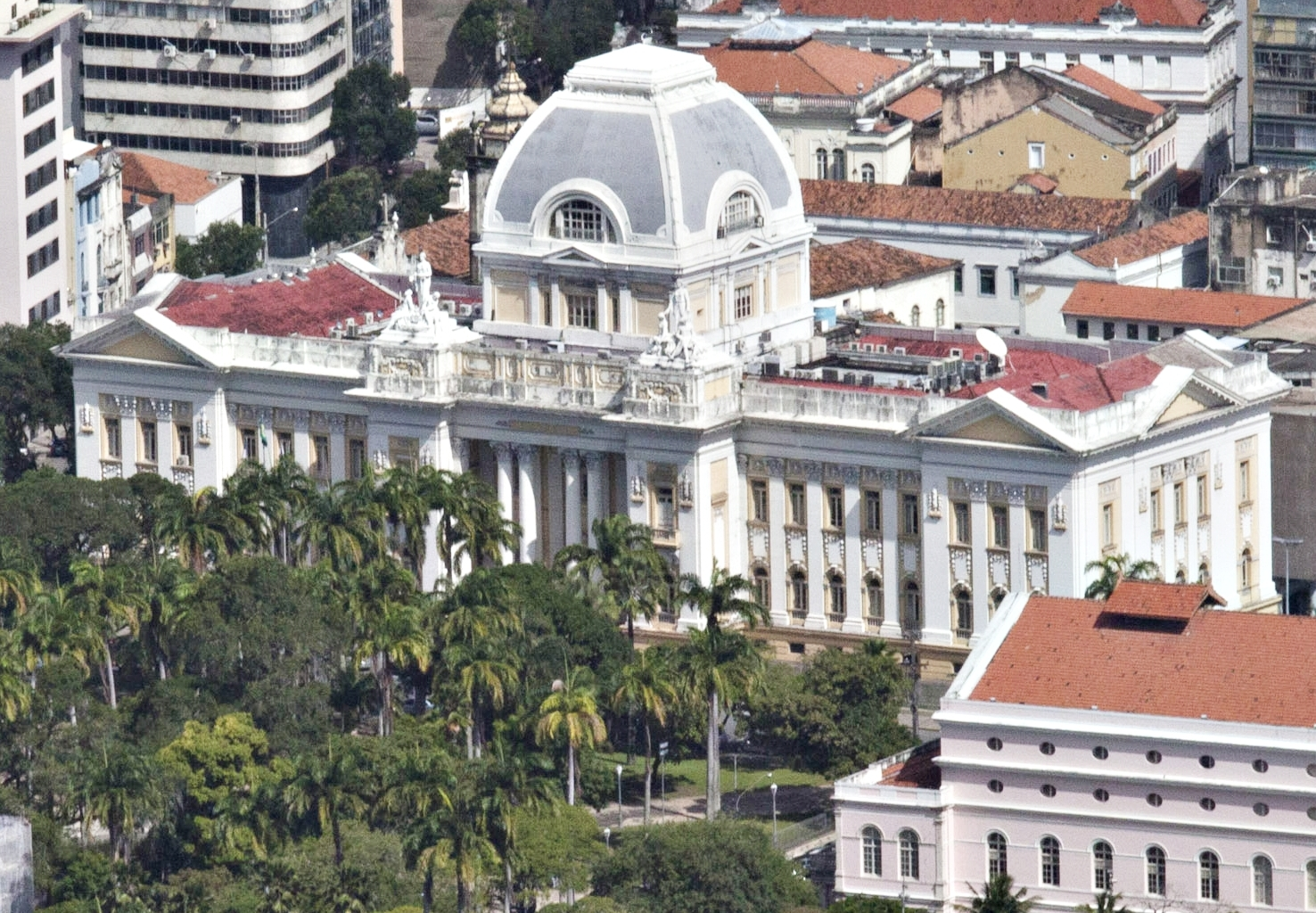
Palace of Justice, headquarters of the judicial power of Pernambuco.

The judiciary has the function of judging, according to laws created by the legislature and Brazilian constitutional rules, and is composed of judges, justices, and ministers. Currently, the highest court in Pernambuco's judiciary is the Court of Justice of Pernambuco (TJPE), located in the República Square. Nowadays, the Court of Justice consists of a full court of 52 judges, 4 of whom occupy the court's board for a two-year term, and 20 (including the 4 on the board) make up a Special Organ, currently its president is Luiz Carlos de Barros Figueiredo.

The TJPE came into existence by charter of João VI on February 6, 1821. At the time, it was called Court of Appeals of Pernambuco and was established in a space inside the former Jesuits' School of Recife on August 13, 1822. After that, the court's headquarters were moved several times until the current one, the Palace of Justice, was built in 1930. The idea of building the Palace of Justice originated in the government of Sérgio Loreto, who laid the cornerstone of the building on July 2, 1924, in commemoration of the first centennial of the Confederation of the Equator and who was responsible for several modernization works in the city of Recife due to the influence generated by the urbanization of European metropolises such as Paris. It was designed by Italian architect Giacomo Palumbo, who had the collaboration of Evaristo de Sá; the built project was the fourth to be presented. The construction of the Palace of Justice lasted six years and eventually suffered a halt of almost two years between 1926 and 1928, so it was inaugurated under the government of Estácio Coimbra on September 7, 1930.

=== Public Prosecutor's Office ===
The Public Prosecutor's Office of Pernambuco (Ministério Público de Pernambuco - MPPE) is a state subdivision of the Federal Public Prosecutor's Office (Ministério Público Federal - MPF) and among its functions are the defense of the legal order, that is, the enforcement of the law, the investigation and external control of police activity, the defense of individual and collective interests of citizens and the defense of the national, public and social heritage; the 1988 Constitution assures the Public Prosecutor's Office functional and administrative autonomy, i.e., it is not subordinated to any of the three branches of government.

The MPPE is presided over by the attorney general, who is appointed by the governor after evaluation of a triple list and remains in office for a minimum of two years, with no term limits for reappointment; the current incumbent is Marcos Carvalho. The administrative structure of the state prosecutor's office also has three deputy attorney general, a chief and a cabinet coordinator, and four technical advisory offices, one with two people and the other three with four people each.

== Fernando de Noronha ==
Flag of Fernando de Noronha.

Fernando de Noronha is a Brazilian archipelago in Pernambuco. Its discovery in 1503 is attributed to the navigator Amerigo Vespúcio, a participant in the second exploratory expedition to the Brazilian coasts, commanded by Gonçalo Coelho and financed by the Portuguese nobleman Fernão de Loronha, a New Christian who was a lessee of Pau-Brasil extraction.

As provided in article 96 of the state constitution, it is a geo-economic, social, and cultural region of Pernambuco, established in the form of a state district. The general administrator of Fernando de Noronha is appointed by the governor, with the prior approval of the Legislative Assembly; the position is currently held by Thallyta Figueirôa, the first woman to assume the position. In addition to the general administrator, the archipelago also has three directorates, the Administrative and Financial Directorate, the Infrastructure and Sustainability Directorate, and the Special Projects Directorate. Following an administrative reform proposed by Governor Raquel Lyra and approved by Alepe, the administration of Fernando de Noronha ceased to be directly subordinated to the governor and became the responsibility of the Secretariat of Environment in January 2023.

As Fernando de Noronha is a special district, local voters do not vote for mayor or councilor, and do not have in their electoral calendar municipal elections, so they vote every four years, and not every two as Brazilian municipalities do. However, the voters of Fernando de Noronha have the right to vote in elections at the national, state and, at the local level, citizens have the right to elect seven district councilors, who are the representatives of the community and exercise activity similar to that of a councilor. Voters in Fernando de Noronha are the first to vote and close polling places in Brazil because the district's time zone, with its location closest to the Greenwich Meridian, is one hour longer than Brasilia time. Fernando de Noronha is not considered a municipality because to be a municipality in Brazil a given region must meet certain requirements, such as having a minimum number of voters and possessing economic autonomy.

== Voter statistics ==
In 2022 Pernambuco had a total of 7,018,098 voters distributed among 185 municipalities. Of this number, more than 53% were women. The growth in relation to the 2020 election was 4.24%. In Pernambuco, 1,689 people from the LGBT public were able to use a social name on their title. In 2018, the cancellation of voter's titles and the prohibition to vote of voters who did not have biometric registration, something close to 3.3 million people nationally, affected 28.4% of Pernambuco's electorate, making the number of Pernambuco voters eligible to vote in 2018 approximately 4.7 million people.

Recife is the municipality with the largest number of voters, with 1,215,546. It is followed by Jaboatão dos Guararapes, with 478,789 voters, Olinda (297,800) and Caruaru (239,299). The municipality with the smallest number of voters is Ingazeira, with just over four thousand. In Pernambuco there are also municipalities with more voters than inhabitants, the largest difference in the state, in 2020, coming from the city of Cumaru, with 5,143 more voters, the city also has the largest difference in absolute numbers in Brazil, besides Cumaru the municipalities of Brejinho, Calumbi and Sairé have more voters than inhabitants.

== Access to information ==
=== Transparency ===
Since 2007, the government of Pernambuco has had an official transparency portal that is maintained by the Secretariat of the State Comptroller General (Secretaria da Controladoria-Geral do Estado - SCGE). According to the portal, the state is a pioneer and national reference in this regard. The portal has information on state expenditures and budget, the annual rendering of accounts, fiscal reports, and state assets.

The Comptroller General of the Union (Controladoria-Geral da União - CGU), since 2015, evaluates states and municipalities in a transparency ranking known as the Transparent Brazil Scale (Escala Brasil Transparente - EBT). In the first edition of the ranking, the state ranked eleventh (8.61), with the same score as Tocantins. In the second, it had its worst performance in this ranking, with the twentieth position (6.67), in a drop of almost two points in relation to the previous edition. In the following edition it had its best performance, with the first place (10), but in this edition, twelve states were tied in this position. In the first release of the result of the 2018 edition of EBT, which occurred on December 12, 2018, Pernambuco had ranked first on the scale (with a score of 9.4) and this fact was publicized by the Pernambuco press and by the governor, in a post on a social network. However, there were requests for grade revision by some states and municipalities analyzed by the ranking that year and part of them were accepted by CGU, which released the final result on February 28, 2019. After the revision, the state of Pernambuco was ranked fourth, the same as Santa Catarina, and the state that reached the first place was Mato Grosso do Sul, taking the score 9.64. Pernambuco was not one of the states that requested revision of its score, so it was not changed.

The EBT is also used to assess transparency in municipalities. In relation to Pernambuco's municipalities, Recife has always taken the top Pernambuco position in the overall ranking and when assessing only the state's municipalities. However, in the second and third editions the municipalities of São Vicente Férrer and Serra Talhada also took the top score. In the 2018 edition, Recife had ranked second among Brazilian capitals in the first disclosure, behind only Vitória, but it moved up to the highest score after its score was raised from 9.76 to 9.9.

The Court of Accounts also does its own transparency ranking among Pernambuco municipalities, the ITMPE. The assessment has been done since 2015 for municipalities and since 2017 for city councils. It uses the scales desirable (between 0.75 and 1), moderate (0.5 and 0.75), insufficient (0.25 and 0.5), critical (0.01 and 0.25), and non-existent with a score of 0, and the values of the scores were up to 1000 (for example desirable would be 750 up to 1000) before 2018. In the 2015 and 2016 editions, the only city hall to reach the desirable scale was Recife. In the 2017 edition Jaboatão dos Guararapes entered this scale and in the 2018 edition 101 more city halls also entered, making their percentage increase from 1.09% to 56%. The municipality of Recife was in first place in all editions except the 2018 edition, in this one it was the municipality of Jaboatão dos Guararapes with an index of 0.94. With respect to municipal councils, in the 2017 edition none reached the desirable scale, the one that ranked first was the one of Palmeirina (the one of Recife was in the 48th position). In the 2018 edition, 56 councils (30.4% of the total), including Recife, reached the maximum scale, and the one that ranked first was Lagoa do Ouro, with an index of 0.96 (Recife's index: 0.83).

=== Electoral corruption ===
Based on data released by the Superior Electoral Court, the Anti-Electoral Corruption Movement released a balance sheet on October 4, 2007, listing the parties and states with the highest number of parliamentarians terminated for corruption since 2000. Pernambuco appears in fifteenth place on the list, with 14 parliamentarians terminated, tying in that position with Pará and Maranhão.

== State symbols ==
=== Flag ===
Flag of Pernambuco.

The current flag of Pernambuco is inspired by the Pernambucan Revolution. It is similar to the one used by the revolutionaries of 1817. The only difference between the two flags is that the current flag has one star in the center instead of three. The 1817 flag was made by priest João Ribeiro de Melo Montenegro with the collaboration of Antônio Alvares and tailor José do Ó Barbosa and, after being forgotten for some time, was rescued by governor Manuel Borba for the commemoration of the centenary of the revolution through decree No. 459/1917. The flag of the Pernambucan Revolution was hoisted for the first time on April 2, 1817.

According to the state government's website, the blue color of the upper rectangle symbolizes the greatness of Pernambuco's sky; the white color represents peace; the rainbow in three colors (green, yellow, red) represents the union of all Pernambucans; the star characterizes the state in the federation as a whole; the sun is Pernambuco's strength and energy, and the cross represents faith in justice and understanding.

=== Coat of arms ===
Coat of arms of Pernambuco.

The coat of arms of Pernambuco was made official by Governor Barbosa Lima through State Law No. 75 of May 21, 1895. One of the symbols of the coat of arms, the Barra lighthouse was originally built in 1822 as part of the old Barra Fort. In 1931 the lighthouse was even deactivated because it was considered outdated, but was reactivated a year later and, after a transfer in 1938, was relocated to its original place in 1945.

The coat of arms was even revitalized by researcher Jobson Figueiredo in 1997, at the request of Judge Itamar Pereira da Silva, then general corregedor of justice, before this revitalization the coat of arms was produced randomly and without any official confection methodology, Jobson's work was registered with the Archeological, Historical and Geographical Institute of Pernambuco and is used as the standard format to represent the coat of arms.

In the symbolism of the state coat of arms, the lion represents the bravery of the Pernambucanian people; the cotton and sugarcane branches symbolize the state's riches; the sun is the shining light of the equator; the stars are the Pernambuco municipalities. Still on the coat of arms are the sea of Recife and the lighthouse of Barra Fort, from which the city of Olinda can be seen. On the banner, the most important historical dates appear: 1710 (Mascate War), 1817 (Pernambucan Revolution), 1824 (Confederation of the Equator), and 1889 (Proclamation of the Republic).

=== Anthem ===
The Pernambuco Anthem was composed in 1908 with the lyrics of Oscar Brandão da Rocha and the composition of Nicolino Milano. The anthem extols the historical achievements of the Pernambucan people and the various battles that have marked the state's past.

In 2002, during Jarbas Vasconcelos' first term in office, the government acted in partnership with the Recife City Hall and the Secretariat of Tourism to promote a wider dissemination of the anthem through its re-recording in the most varied rhythms, such as frevo, forró, and manguebeat. Artists such as Alceu Valença, Dominguinhos, and Cannibal from the band Devotos were part of this project.

== See also ==
- Politics of Brazil
- Fernando de Noronha
- Pernambucan Revolution
- Mascate War
- Confederation of the Equator

== Bibliography ==
- Asfora, João Sales (2002). Palestinos: a saga de seus descendentes (in Portuguese). Brazil: Indústria Gráfica e Editora.
- Bueno, Eduardo (2019). Capitães do Brasil: A saga dos primeiros colonizadores (in Portuguese). Rio de Janeiro: Sextante. ISBN 9788556080547
- Gândavo, Pero de Magalhães (1980). Tratado da Terra do Brasil; História da Província Santa Cruz (in Portuguese). Belo Horizonte: Itatiaia.
- Hemming, John (2007). Ouro vermelho: a conquista dos índios brasileiros (in Portuguese). São Paulo: EdUSP. ISBN 9788531409608
- Neto, Lira (2012). Getúlio (1882-1930): Dos anos de formação à conquista do poder (in Portuguese). São Paulo: Companhia das Letras. ISBN 978-85-8086-230-0.
- Silva, Luiz Geraldo (2001). A faina, a festa e o rito: uma etnografia histórica sobre as gentes do mar (sécs. XVII ao XIX) (in Portuguese). Campinas: Papirus. ISBN 9788530806354
