= André Ferreira =

André Ferreira may refer to:

- André Ferreira (volleyball) (born 1964), Brazilian former volleyball player
- André Ferreira (footballer, born 1990), Portuguese footballer
- André Ferreira (footballer, born 1996), Portuguese footballer
- André Ferreira (politician) (born 1972), Brazilian politician
- André Luís Ferreira (born 1959), former Brazilian footballer
