= Guilherme Uchoa Júnior =

Brazilian politician (born 1971)

Member of the Chamber of Deputies
- Incumbent
- Assumed office 1 February 2023
- Constituency: Pernambuco

Personal details
- Born: 27 April 1971 (age 55)
- Party: PSD (since 2026)
- Parent: Guilherme Uchoa (father)

Guilherme Aristóteles Uchoa Cavalcanti Pessoa de Melo Júnior (born 27 April 1971) is a Brazilian politician serving as a member of the Chamber of Deputies since 2023. From 2019 to 2023, he was a member of the Legislative Assembly of Pernambuco.
