= José Eriberto Medeiros =

Brazilian politician

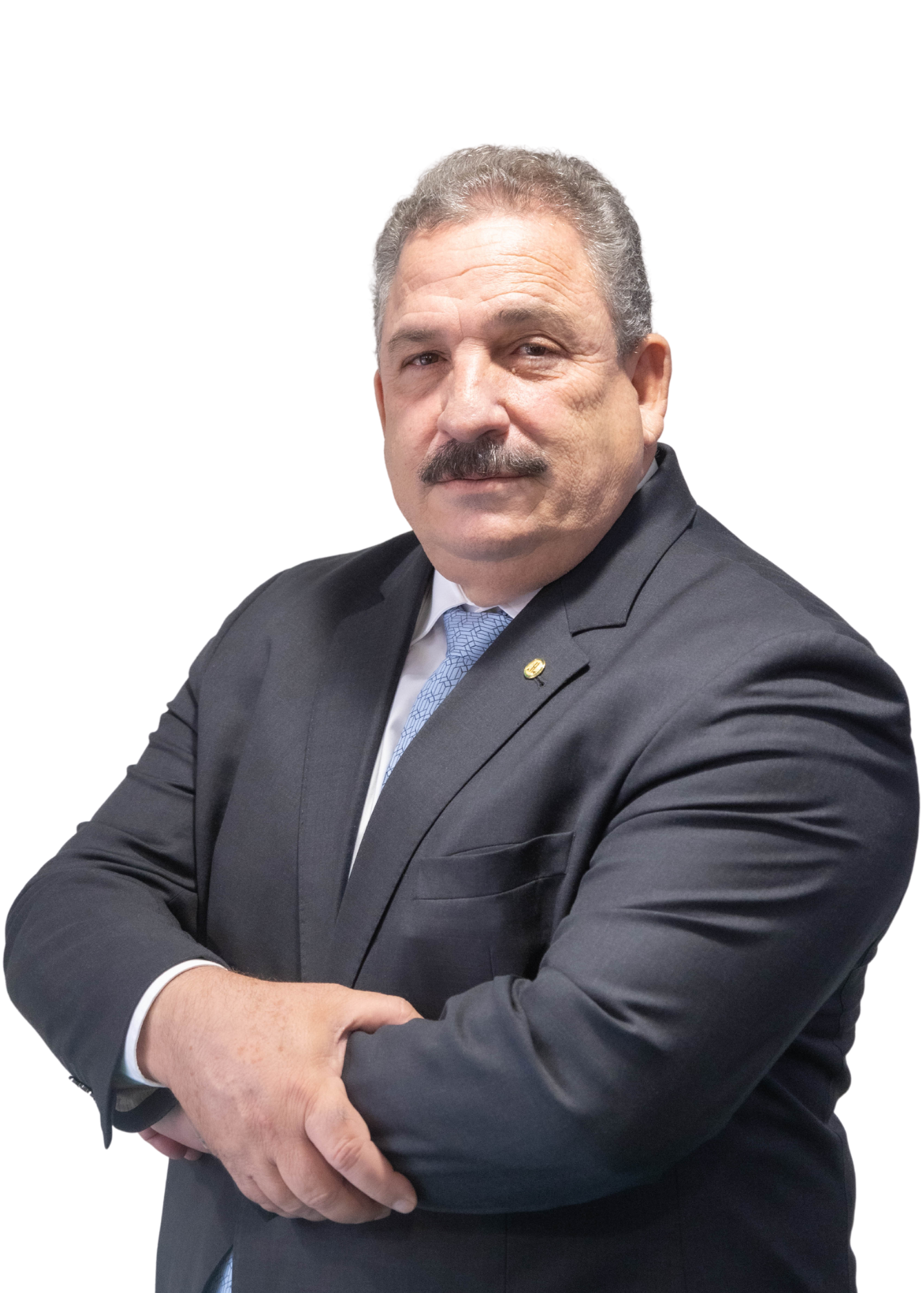

Federal Deputy for Pernambuco
- Incumbent
- Assumed office February 1st, 2023
- Constituency: Pernambuco

President of the Legislative Assembly of Pernambuco
- In office August 1st, 2018 – February 1st, 2023
- Preceded by: Cleiton Collins
- Succeeded by: Álvaro Porto

State Deputy of Pernambuco
- In office February 1st, 2007 – February 1st, 2023

Councillor of Recife
- In office January 1st, 2001 – February 1st, 2007

Personal details
- Born: 26 September 1965 (age 60) Recife, Pernambuco, Brazil
- Other political affiliations: PP (2003–2005); PTdoB (2005–2007); PTC (2007–2018); PP (2018–2022); PSB (2022–)
- Spouse: Mariana Medeiros

José Eriberto Medeiros (born September 26, 1965) is a Brazilian politician affiliated with the Brazilian Socialist Party (PSB). He was a state deputy and president of the Legislative Assembly of Pernambuco (Alepe). In 2022, he was elected federal deputy.

He served as a councillor in Recife between 2001 and 2007 and was president of the PTC in Pernambuco for 11 years. He was elected to the state legislature four times in a row, starting in 2007. His wife, Mariana Medeiros, and his son, Eriberto Rafael, also hold political office.

== Personal life ==
Eriberto Medeiros graduated in law from Catholic University of Pernambuco (Unicap) in 1995. He represents Pernambuco on the National Board of the National Union of State Legislators (Unale) and has been a civil servant since 1987. His wife, Mariana Medeiros, has been mayor of Cumaru since 2016. Eriberto Medeiros' son, Eriberto Rafael, is also active in politics, serving as a councillor in Recife since 2013.

Eriberto was involved in a car accident on March 6, 2016. The car he was in overturned on the PE-050 highway in Vitória de Santo Antão, in the Zona da Mata. There was oil on the road, which caused the vehicle to overturn and hit a wall. Inside the car were Eriberto, his wife and a driver; no one was seriously injured.

== Political career ==
Eriberto Medeiros served as a councillor in Recife for two terms, running in 2000 and 2004. During his terms as a councillor, he served on the Legislation and Justice, Finance, Public Security and Parliamentary Ethics Committees. He was also the 3rd secretary of the executive committee of the Recife City Council.

He ran for the first time in the elections for state representative in 2006. Within Alepe, he was elected fourth secretary of the Board of Directors three times and headed the PTC in Pernambuco for 11 years. He also served on the Ethics, International Affairs and Finance, Budget and Taxation Committees.

After disaffiliating from the PTC and joining the Progressistas in April 2018, Eriberto launched a candidacy for federal deputy in the elections of the same year, but resigned and ran for another term as state deputy. In 2022, he ran for federal deputy for the PSB and was elected.

== President of the Legislative Assembly of Pernambuco ==
After Guilherme Uchoa's death on July 3, 2018, the position of president of the Legislative Assembly was filled on an interim basis by Deputy Cleiton Collins (PP), who decreed elections for the presidency for August 1, 2018. He was considered a possible candidate for this election, but he decided not to run.

Eriberto was elected president of the Legislative Assembly of Pernambuco (Alepe) and took office on August 1, 2018. He ran against Edilson Silva (PSOL), who got one vote, against forty for Medeiros. In February 2019, he was the only candidate for the presidency of the Legislative Assembly, obtaining 42 votes. In December 2020, he stood for re-election and won again with 31 votes, against fourteen for Álvaro Porto (PTB). After being elected as a federal deputy, Eriberto left the presidency of Alepe. Álvaro Porto was elected to succeed him.

== See also ==
- Politics of Brazil
