= 2022 Pernambuco gubernatorial election =

2022 Pernambuco state election
- 2 October 2022 (first round); 30 October 2022 (second round)
- Opinion polls
- Gubernatorial election
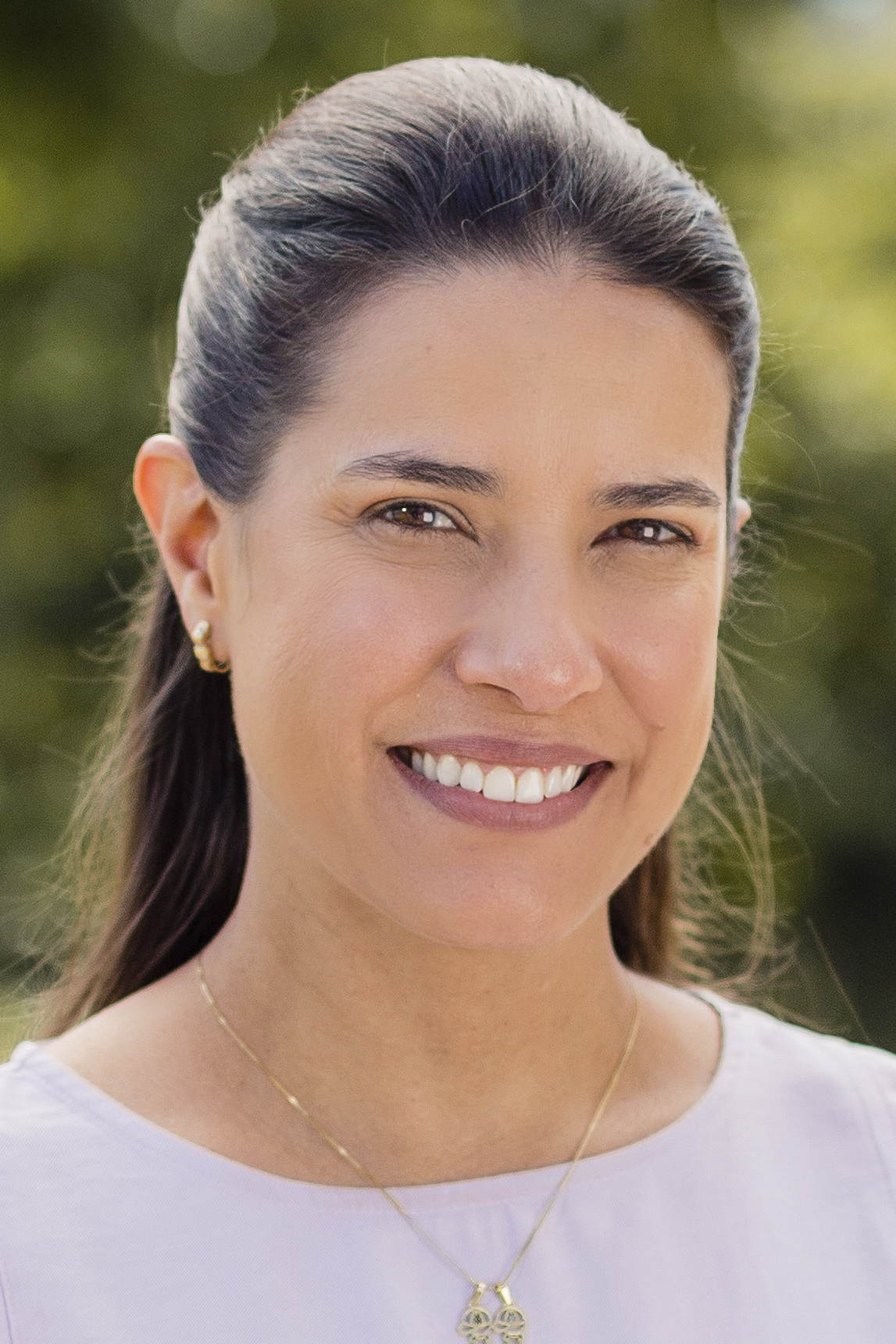

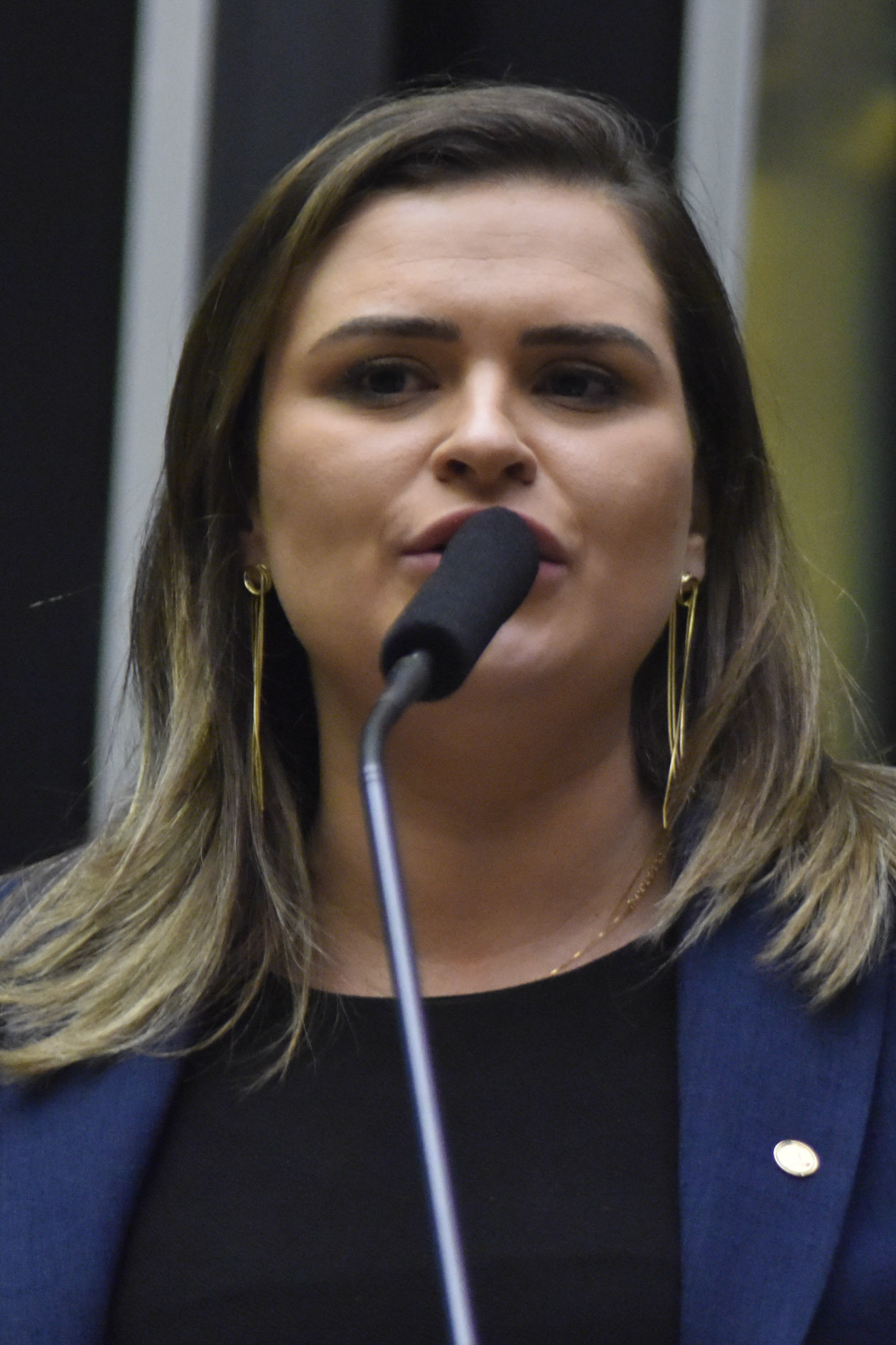
Candidate	Raquel Lyra	Marília Arraes
Party	PSDB	Solidarity
Alliance	Pernambuco quer Mudar	Pernambuco na Veia
Running mate	Priscila Krause	Sebastião Oliveira
Popular vote	3,113,415	2,190,264
Percentage	58.70%	41.30%
- Most voted candidates by municipalities (185) in the second round: Raquel Lyra (105 municipalities); Marília Arraes (80 municipalities)
Governor before election
Paulo Câmara
PSB
Elected Governor
Raquel Lyra
PSDB
- Parliamentary election
- All 49 seats of the Legislative Assembly
Party	Leader	Vote %	Seats	+/–
Legislative Assembly
PSB	Sivaldo Albino	25.71	14	+3
PP	Roberta Arraes	15.42	8	−2
UNIÃO	Alessandra Vieira	9.85	5	New
PL	Manuel Ferreira da Silva	9.05	5	+3
Solidarity	Gustavo Gouveia	7.86	3	+2
PT	Doriel Saturnino	7.17	3	0
PSDB	Álvaro Porto de Barros	4.46	3	+2
PV	Joaquim Carneiro	3.41	3	+3
Republicanos	William Brígido	5.05	2	+1
Patriota	Joãozinho Tenório	3.49	1	+1
PCdoB	João Paulo Cavalcanti	1.82	1	0
PSOL	Jô Cavalcanti	1.78	1	0
This lists parties that won seats. See the complete results below.
- Senatorial election
- 2 October 2022 (one-only round)
- Opinion polls
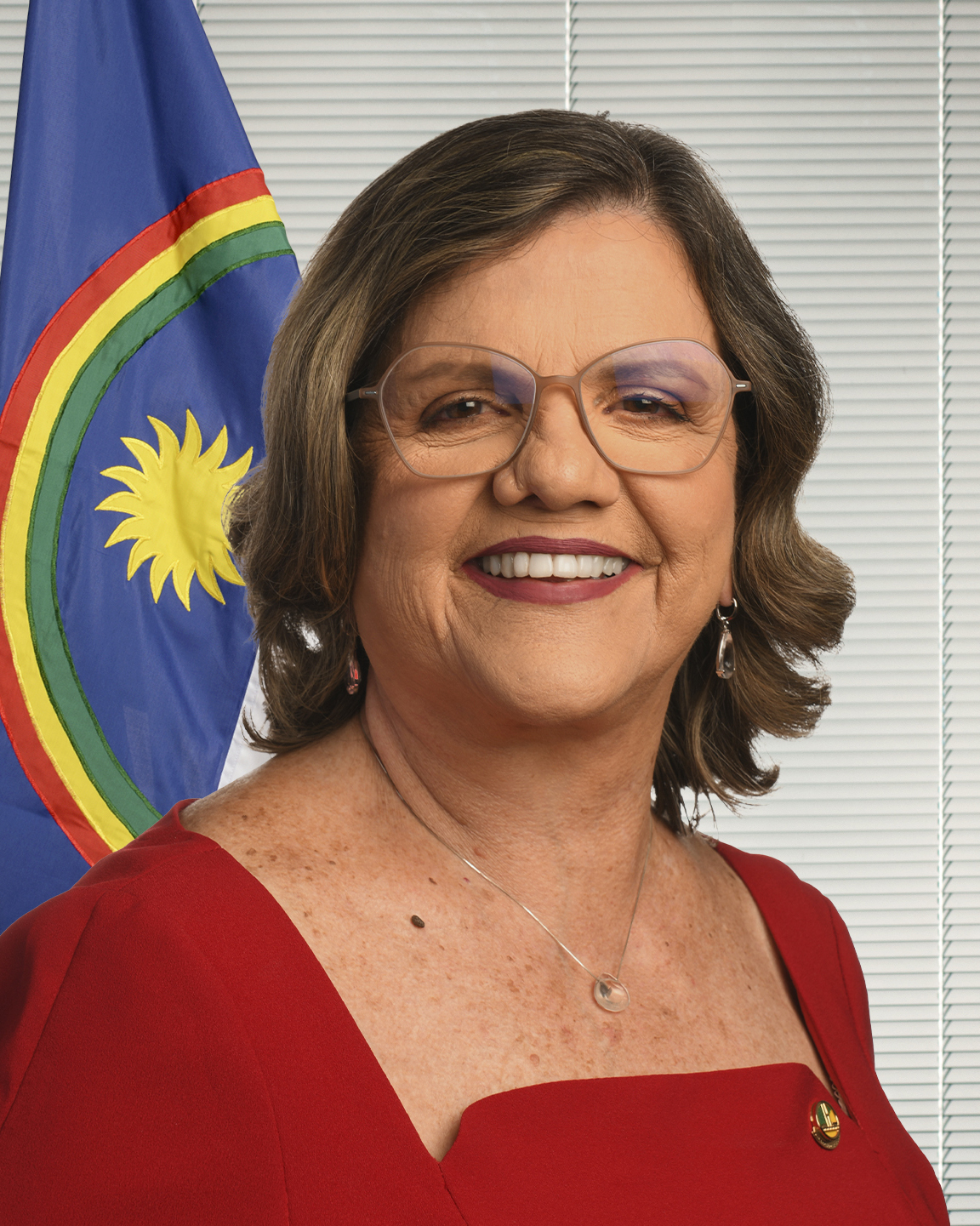

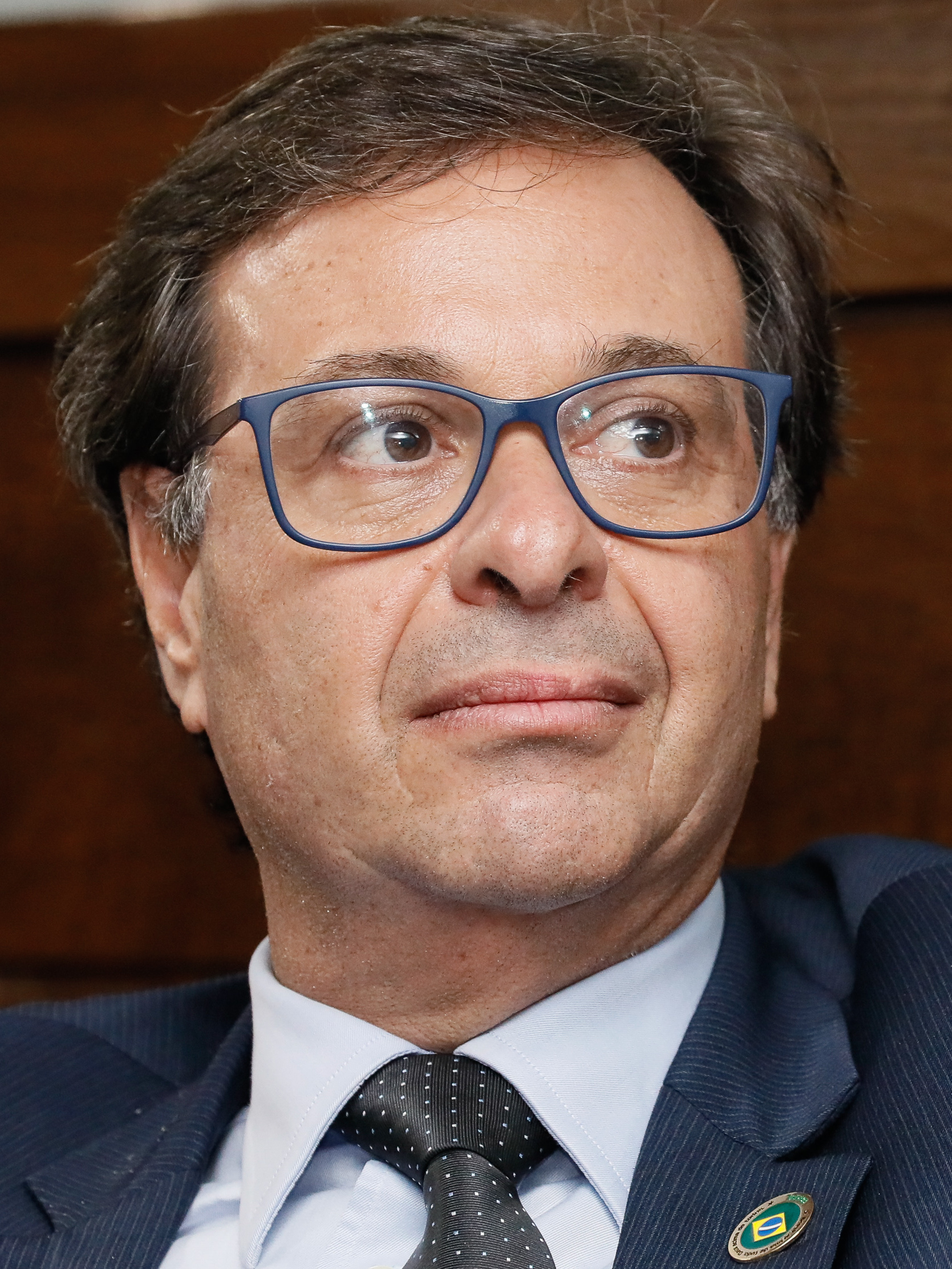
Candidate	Teresa Leitão	Gilson Machado Neto
Party	PT	PL
Popular vote	2.061.276	1.320.555
Percentage	46,62%	29,55%
- Most voted candidates by municipality (185): Teresa Leitão (138); André de Paula (34); Gilson Machado (8); Carlos Andrade (4); Guilherme Coelho (1)
Senator before election
Fernando Bezerra Coelho
MDB
Elected Senator
Teresa Leitão
PT

The 2022 Pernambuco state elections took place in the state of Pernambuco, Brazil on 2 October 2022. Voters elected a governor, vice governor, one senator, 25 representatives for the Chamber of Deputies, and 49 Legislative Assembly members. Paulo Câmara, the incumbent governor of Pernambuco, was reelected in the first round in 2018 Pernambuco gubernatorial election, with 1,918,219 votes, the equivalent to 50.70% of the valid votes. He wasn't eligible for a new term, since he ran for governor in 2014 and 2018. In a crowded field, former mayor of Caruaru Raquel Lyra (PSDB) defeated Federal Deputy Marília Arraes (Solidarity) by close to 20 points in the second round. She was inaugurated on 1 January 2023.

For the election to the Federal Senate, the seat occupied since 2014 by Fernando Bezerra Coelho, who was elected by the Brazilian Socialist Party (PSB), and currently affiliated to the Brazilian Democratic Movement (MDB), was at dispute. Teresa Leitão (PT), a state deputy, defeated former Minister of Tourism Gilson Machado (PL) by 15 points.

== Electoral calendar ==
Note: This section only presents the main dates of the 2022 electoral calendar, check the TSE official website (in Portuguese) and other official sources for detailed information.

Electoral calendar
15 May	Start of crowdfunding of candidates
20 July to 5 August	Party conventions for choosing candidates and coalitions
16 August to 30 September	Period of exhibition of free electoral propaganda on radio, television and on the internet related to the first round
2 October	First round of 2022 elections
7 October to 28 October	Period of exhibition of free electoral propaganda on radio, television and on the internet related to a possible second round
30 October	Possible second round of 2022 elections
until 19 December	Delivery of electoral diplomas for those who were elected in the 2022 elections by the Brazilian Election Justice

== Gubernatorial candidates ==
Political parties have until 15 August 2022 to formally register their candidates.

=== Candidates in runoff ===
Governor		Previous office	Vice Governor		Previous office	Coalition	Ref.
Party Federation	Candidate	Previous office	Party Federation	Candidate	Previous office	Coalition	Ref.
PSDB	Raquel Lyra	Mayor of Caruaru	CID	Priscila Krause	State Deputy for Pernambuco	Pernambuco Wants Change (Fed. PSDB/CID (PSDB and CID) and PRTB)	
SD	Marília Arraes	Federal Deputy for Pernambuco	AVANTE	Sebastian Oliveira	Federal Deputy for Pernambuco	Pernambuco in my Blood (SD, AVANTE, PSD, AGIR, PMN, and PROS)	

=== Candidates failing to make runoff ===
Governor		Previous office	Vice Governor		Previous office	Coalition	Ref.
Party Federation	Candidate	Previous office	Party Federation	Candidate	Previous office	Coalition	Ref.
PTB	Pastor Wellington		PTB	Carol Tosaka			
PSTU	Claudia Ribeiro		PSTU	Professor Mariano			
PCB	Jones Manoel		PCB	Raline Almeida			
PL	Anderson Ferreira	Mayor of Jaboatão dos Guararapes	PL	Izabel Urquiza	Secretary of Economic Development of Olinda		
PCO	Ubiracy Olímpio		PCO	Anderson Isaiah			
PMB	Jadilson Bombeiro		PMB	Fernanda Souto Maior			
PSB	Danilo Cabral	Federal Deputy for Pernambuco	PCdoB	Luciana Santos	Vice Governor of Pernambuco	Popular Front of Pernambuco (PSB, FE Brazil (PT PCdoB, and PV), MDB, Republicans, PDT, and PP)	
UNIÃO	Miguel Coelho	Mayor of Petrolina	UNIÃO	Alessandra Vieira	State Deputy for Pernambuco		
PSOL	João Arnaldo		REDE	Alice Gabino			

Candidate name and party	Most recent political office	Party logo	Details	Vice Governor	Ref.
Danilo Cabral; Brazilian Socialist Party (PSB)	Federal Deputy from Pernambuco (since 2011)		Born in Surubim, Pernambuco in 1967. Lawyer and former city councillor of Recife (2005–2009).		
Marília Arraes; Solidariedade (SD)	Federal Deputy from Pernambuco (since 2019)		Born in Recife, Pernambuco in 1984. Former city councillor of Recife (2009–2019).		
Raquel Lyra; Brazilian Social Democracy Party (PSDB)	Mayor of Caruaru (2017–2022)		Born in Recife, Pernambuco in 1978. State deputy for Pernambuco (2011–2017).		
Anderson Ferreira; Liberal Party (PL)	Mayor of Jaboatão dos Guararapes (2017–2022)		Born in Recife, Pernambuco in 1972. Federal deputy for Pernambuco (2011–2017).		
Miguel Coelho; Brazil Union (UNIÃO)	Mayor of Petrolina (2017–2022)		Born in Recife, Pernambuco in 1990. Lawyer and state deputy for Pernambuco (2015–2017).		
Jones Manoel; Brazilian Communist Party (PCB)	No prior public office		Born in Recife, Pernambuco in 1990. History teacher, writer and YouTuber.		
João Arnaldo; Socialism and Liberty Party (PSOL)	No prior public office		Born in Salgueiro, Pernambuco in 1974. Lawyer and running mate of Marília Arraes in 2020 Recife mayoral election.		
Cláudia Ribeiro; United Socialist Workers' Party (PSTU)	No prior public office		Born in Rio de Janeiro in 1972. Teacher and candidate for mayor in 2020 Recife mayoral election.		
Wellington Carneiro; Brazilian Labour Party (PTB)	No prior public office		Born in Garanhuns, Pernambuco in 1973. Lawyer, evangelical pastor and candidate for Vice Mayor in 2020 Recife mayoral election.		
Esteves Jacinto; Brazilian Labour Renewal Party (PRTB)	No prior public office		Born in Recife, Pernambuco in 1966. Evangelical pastor and singer.		
Jadilson Bombeiro; Brazilian Woman's Party (PMB)	No prior public office		Born in Recife, Pernambuco in 1978. Firefighter.		

=== Withdrawn candidacies ===
- Humberto Costa (PT) - Senator for Pernambuco (2011–present). He withdrew the candidacy by orders of the party itself. The Workers' Party will support the candidacy of Danilo Cabral (PSB).
- Armando Filho (PRTB) - He was announced as a candidate for the government by the Brazilian Labour Renewal Party but he gave up and decided to support the candidacy of Raquel Lyra. He was expelled from the party after this decision.
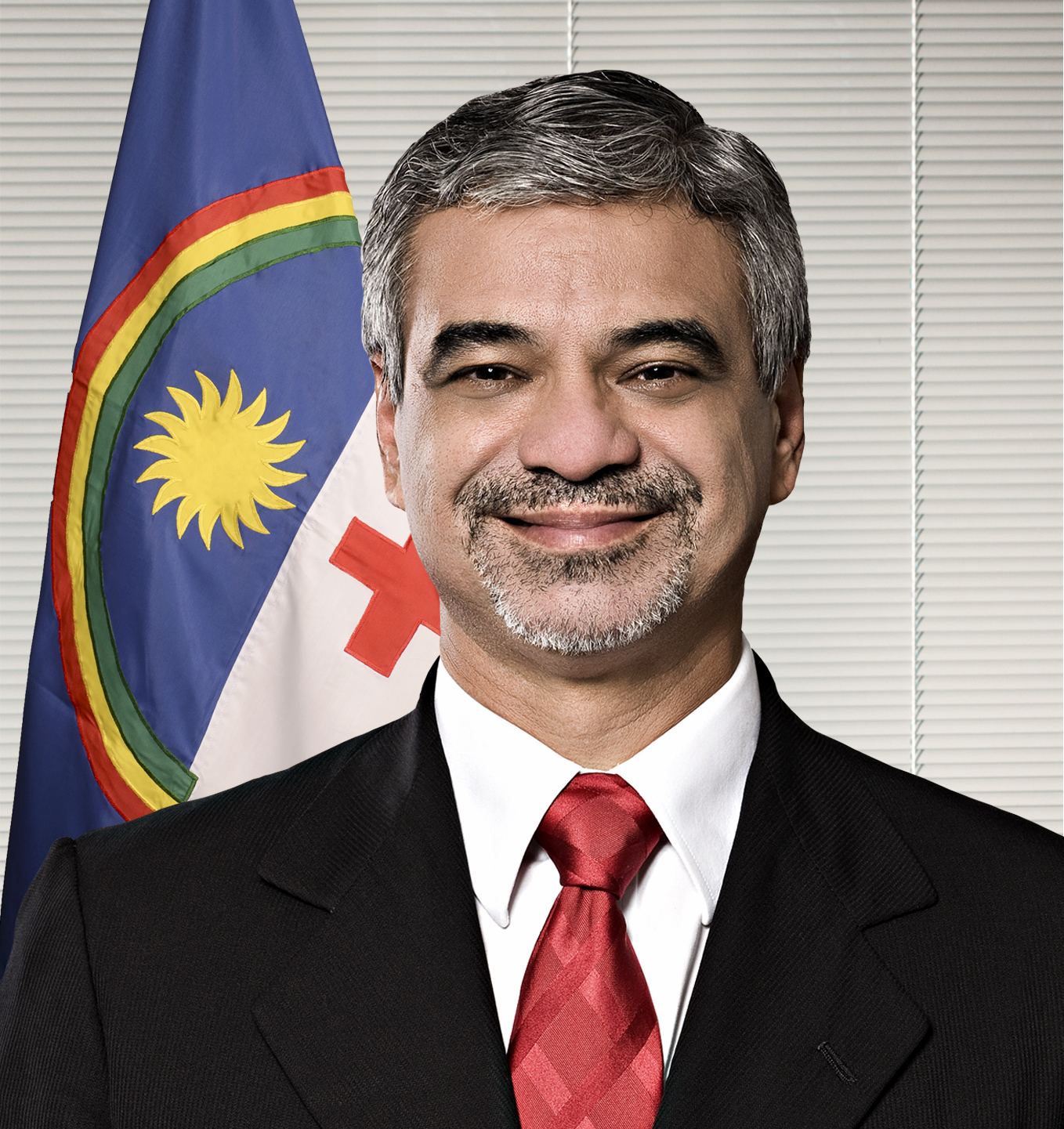
Senator
Humberto Costa (PT)
for Pernambuco

== Senatorial candidates ==
Political parties have until 15 August 2022 to formally register their candidates.

=== Potential candidates ===
Candidate name and party		Most recent political office	Party logo	Details	Ref.
Armando Monteiro; Brazilian Social Democracy Party (PSDB)	Danilo Cabral	Senator for Pernambuco (2011–2019)		Born in Recife, Pernambuco in 1952. 34th Minister of Development, Industry and Foreign Trade (2015–2016) and Federal Deputy from Pernambuco (1999–2011).	
André de Paula; Social Democratic Party (PSD)	Danilo Cabral	Federal Deputy from Pernambuco (since 2019)		Born in Recife, Pernambuco in 1961. Lawyer, 2nd Vice President of the Chamber of Deputies (since 2021) and state deputy for Pernambuco for two periods: (1989–1991) and (1991–1998).	
Gilson Machado Neto; Social Christian Party (PSC)		Minister of Tourism of Brazil (2020–2022)		Born in Recife, Pernambuco in 1968. Accordionist, entrepreneur and politician.	
Teresa Leitão; Workers' Party (PT)		State Deputy of Pernambuco (since 2013)		Born in Recife, Pernambuco in 1951. Teacher and unionist.	
Luciana Santos; Communist Party of Brazil (PCdoB)		Vice Governor of Pernambuco (since 2019)		Born in Recife, Pernambuco in 1965. National president of the Communist Party of Brazil (PCdoB) since 2015 and federal deputy for Pernambuco (2011–2018). Pernambuco State Secretary of Science and Technology (2009–2010). Mayor of Olinda, Pernambuco (2001–2008) and state deputy of Pernambuco (1997–2000).	
Eugênia Lima; Socialism and Liberty Party (PSOL)		No prior public office		Born in Recife, Pernambuco in 1983. Candidate for senator in 2018 Pernambuco state election.	
Wolney Queiroz; Democratic Labour Party (PDT)		Federal Deputy from Pernambuco (since 2007)		Born in Caruaru, Pernambuco in 1972. Federal Deputy from Pernambuco (1995–1999) and city councillor of Caruaru (1993–1995).	
Silvio Costa Filho; Republicans		Federal Deputy from Pernambuco (since 2019)		Born in Recife, Pernambuco in 1982. State deputy of Pernambuco (2007–2019), Secretary of Tourism of Pernambuco (2007–2009) and City Councillor of Recife (2005–2007).	

=== Withdrawn candidates ===
- Carlos Veras (PT) - Federal Deputy from Pernambuco (2019–present). Veras withdrew his candidacy to help the Workers' Party (PT) in the composition of the senatorial ticket, in order to build a consensus around the party's nomination. The federal deputy stated that this would help his ally Teresa Leitão on the gender issue on the ticket and that she has all the qualifications to be a senator.

== Legislative Assembly ==
The result of the last state election and the current situation in the Legislative Assembly of Pernambuco is given below:

Affiliation	Members		+/–
Affiliation	Elected	Current	+/–
PSB	11	14	▲3
PP	10	7	▼3
Solidarity	1	4	▲3
PSC	5	4	▼1
PL	2	3	▲1
PT	3	3	Steady
PV	0	2	▲2
UNIÃO	New	2	▲2
Cidadania	0	1	▲1
PSDB	1	1	Steady
PCdoB	1	1	Steady
Avante	1	1	Steady
PDT	1	1	Steady
PSOL	1	1	Steady
Republicanos	1	1	Steady
PRTB	1	1	Steady
PTB	2	1	▼1
MDB	1	0	▼1
PHS	1	0	▼1
DEM	3	1	▼2
PSD	3	0	▼3
Total	49		–

== Opinion polls ==
=== Governor ===
==== First round ====
The first round is scheduled to take place on 2 October 2022.

Pollster/client(s)	Date(s) conducted	Sample size	Arraes SD	Lyra PSDB	Cabral PSB	Coelho UNIÃO	Anderson PL	Arnaldo PSOL	Jones PCB	Others	Abst. Undec.	Lead
Paraná Pesquisas	4–8 Jul 2022	1.510	30,7%	15,6%	7,5%	12,5%	13%	0,6%	0,6%	–	19,5%	15,1%
IPESPE	28–30 Jun 2022	1.000	29%	13%	10%	9%	12%	1%	–	(Note: Wellington Carneiro (PTB) with 1%. Esteves Jacinto (PRTB) and Jadilson Bombeiro (PMB) didn't reach 1%. The name of the candidate Jones Manoel (PCB) was on the list, but wasn't mentioned by any respondent.)	27%	16%
IPESPE	28–30 Jun 2022	1.000	24%	10%	24%	8%	14%	–	–	(Note: Possible electoral scenario in which the presidential candidate Lula (PT) would support Danilo Cabral (PSB) for the government of Pernambuco; Paulinho da Força (SD) would support Marília Arraes (SD); Jair Bolsonaro (PL) would support Anderson Ferreira (PL); Simone Tebet (MDB) would support Raquel Lyra (PSDB) and Luciano Bivar (UNIÃO) would support Miguel Coelho (UNIÃO).)	20%	Tie
Instituto Potencial Inteligência	24–28 Jun 2022	1.202	25,5%	11,9%	8,6%	8,6%	13,1%	0,7%	0,7%	0,9% (Note: Esteves Jacinto (PRTB) with 0,7% and Jadilson Bombeiro (PMB) with 0,2%)	30%	12,4%
Instituto Potencial Inteligência	24–28 Jun 2022	1.202	20,3%	–	14,8%	–	16,1%	–	–	(Note: Possible electoral scenario in which the presidential candidate Lula (PT) supports Danilo Cabral (PSB) for the government of Pernambuco; Paulinho da Força (SD) supports Marília Arraes (SD) and Jair Bolsonaro (PL) supports Anderson Ferreira (PL).)	48,8%	4,2%
Real Time Big Data	24–25 Jun 2022	1.500	27%	18%	10%	10%	12%	1%	1%	1% (Note: Wellington Carneiro (PTB) with 1%; Esteves Jacinto (PRTB), Jadilson Bombeiro (PMB) and Claudia Ribeiro (PSTU) did not score on this opinion poll.)	20%	9%
Instituto Opinião	11–14 Jun 2022	2.000	28,1%	12,6%	4,5%	8,7%	8,8%	0,6%	0,3%	1,1% (Note: Esteves Jacinto (PRTB) with 0,6% and Jadilson Bombeiro (PMB) with 0,5%)	35,3%	15,5%
EXAME/IDEIA	3–8 Jun 2022	1.000	24%	18%	8%	12%	12%	2%	1%	0,5% (Note: Jadilson Bombeiro (PMB) with 0,3% and Esteves Jacinto (PRTB) 0,2%)	24%	6%
Paraná Pesquisas	10–14 May 2022	1.510	28,8%	16%	7,1%	13,6%	12,1%	1,3%	0,7%	–	20,5%	12,8%
Paraná Pesquisas	10–14 May 2022	1.510	34,9%	–	8,3%	15,4%	12,8%	2,2%	1,5%	–	24,9%	19,5%
Paraná Pesquisas	10–14 May 2022	1.510	32,6%	18,8%	7,7%	–	12,6%	1,4%	0,9%	–	25,9%	13,8%
Instituto Múltipla	9–13 May 2022	800	11,5%	8,3%	32,5%	3,3%	16,9%	–	–	(Note: Possible electoral scenario in which the presidential candidate Lula (PT) supports Danilo Cabral (PSB) for the government of Pernambuco; Paulinho da Força (SD) supports Marília Arraes (SD); Jair Bolsonaro (PL) supports Anderson Ferreira (PL); João Doria (PSDB) supports Raquel Lyra (PSDB) and Luciano Bivar (UNIÃO) supports Miguel Coelho (UNIÃO).)	27,5%	15,6%
Instituto Múltipla	9–13 May 2022	800	12,4%	9%	28,1%	3,8%	16,6%	–	–	(Note: Possible electoral scenario in which the presidential candidate Lula (PT) and the governor of Pernambuco, Paulo Câmara (PSB) supports Danilo Cabral (PSB) for the government of Pernambuco; Paulinho da Força (SD) supports Marília Arraes (SD); Jair Bolsonaro (PL) supports Anderson Ferreira (PL); João Doria (PSDB) supports Raquel Lyra (PSDB) and Luciano Bivar (UNIÃO) supports Miguel Coelho (UNIÃO).)	30,1%	11,5%
Instituto Opinião	30 Apr–2 May 2022	2.000	31,9%	13,3%	5%	9,1%	10,3%	1,5%	0,8%	–	28,1%	18,6%
Instituto Opinião	30 Apr–2 May 2022	2.000	21,1%	9%	21,4%	7,5%	14,9%	–	–	(Note: Possible electoral scenario in which the presidential candidate Lula (PT) supports Danilo Cabral (PSB) for the government of Pernambuco; Paulinho da Força (SD) supports Marília Arraes (SD); Jair Bolsonaro (PL) supports Anderson Ferreira (PL) and João Doria (PSDB) supports Raquel Lyra (PSDB))	26,1%	0,3%
Conectar	21–24 Apr 2022	1.000	26%	15%	5%	12%	8%	2%	1%	–	31%	11%
Conectar	21–24 Apr 2022	1.000	–	24%	8%	14%	9%	3%	2%	–	42%	10%
Conectar	21–24 Apr 2022	1.000	29%	18%	6%	–	9%	4%	1%	–	33%	11%
Conectar	21–24 Apr 2022	1.000	34%	–	6%	12%	10%	4%	1%	–	34%	22%
Conectar	21–24 Apr 2022	1.000	–	27%	8%	–	12%	7%	2%	–	44%	15%
Conectar	21–24 Apr 2022	1.000	–	–	12%	18%	13%	6%	2%	–	49%	5%
Conectar	21–24 Apr 2022	1.000	36%	–	9%	–	11%	6%	1%	–	37%	25%
Conectar	26–29 Mar 2022	1.000	28%	14%	6%	11%	8%	2%	1%	–	32%	14%
Conectar	26–29 Mar 2022	1.000	–	21%	8%	15%	11%	4%	3%	–	39%	6%
Conectar	26–29 Mar 2022	1.000	31%	17%	6%	–	9%	3%	1%	–	33%	14%
Conectar	26–29 Mar 2022	1.000	34%	–	8%	12%	9%	4%	1%	–	33%	22%
Conectar	26–29 Mar 2022	1.000	–	25%	11%	–	11%	7%	2%	–	45%	14%
Conectar	26–29 Mar 2022	1.000	–	–	12%	18%	12%	7%	2%	–	49%	6%
Conectar	26–29 Mar 2022	1.000	38%	–	10%	–	10%	5%	1%	–	37%	28%
25 Mar 2022		Marília Arraes leaves the Workers' Party and joins Solidariedade, in order to run for the 2022 Pernambuco gubernatorial election.										
Pollster/client(s)	Date(s) conducted	Sample size	Arraes PT	Lyra PSDB	Cabral PSB	Coelho UNIÃO	Arnaldo PSOL	Jones PCB	Anderson PL	Others	Abst. Undec.	Lead
Paraná Pesquisas	19–24 Mar 2022	1.510	–	25,8%	11,9%	15,6%	3,3%	0,9%	13,6%	–	28,8%	10,2%
Paraná Pesquisas	19–24 Mar 2022	1.510	–	–	15,2%	23,2%	4,3%	1,2%	15,4%	–	40,8%	7,8%
Paraná Pesquisas	19–24 Mar 2022	1.510	–	29,7%	13,6%	–	3,9%	1,4%	15%	–	36,4%	14,7%
Instituto Múltipla	10–14 Mar 2022	800	–	25,6%	5,9%	10,9%	0,2%	0,4%	9,2%	–	47,4%	14,7%
Empetec/Diário	26 Feb–4 Mar 2022	2.019	–	22,7%	7,6%	9,9%	–		9,1%	–	50,7%	12,8%
Instituto Simplex	22–25 Feb 2022	2.401	–	18,99%	5,07%	9,92%	1,29%	0,25%	9,44%	4,2% (Note: Clarissa Tércio (PSC) with 4,2%)	50,84%	9,07%
Instituto Opinião	17–20 Feb 2022	2.000	–	16,2%	4,2%	9,2%	1,3%	0,7%	5,4%	17,2% (Note: Humberto Costa (PT) with 11,4% and Clarissa Tércio (PSC) with 5,8%)	45,8%	1%
Instituto Opinião	17–20 Feb 2022	2.000	–	18,4%	4,8%	10,2%	1,6%	1,1%	6,5%	5,9% (Note: Clarissa Tércio (PSC) with 5,9%)	51,5%	8,2%
Instituto Opinião	17–20 Feb 2022	2.000	20,9%	14,1%	3,4%	8,4%	0,8%	0,4%	6,4%	4,4% (Note: Clarissa Tércio (PSC) with 4,4%)	41,2%	6,8%
4 Feb 2022		Humberto Costa gives up on his candidacy to the government of Pernambuco.										
Pollster/client(s)	Date(s) conducted	Sample size	Arraes PT	Costa PT	Lyra PSDB	Geraldo PSB	Coelho UNIÃO	Anderson PL	Gilson Ind.	Others	Abst. Undec.	Lead
Vox Populi	22–24 Jan 2022	800	–	31%	14%	16%	4%	–		5% (Note: Clarissa Tércio (PSC) with 5%)	29%	15%
Vox Populi	22–24 Jan 2022	800	–	38%	15%	–	4%	–		8% (Note: Clarissa Tércio (PSC) with 6% and Tadeu Alencar (PSB) with 2%)	33%	23%
Vox Populi	22–24 Jan 2022	800	–	37%	17%	–	4%	–		7% (Note: Clarissa Tércio (PSC) with 6% and Danilo Cabral (PSB) with 1%)	33%	20%
Instituto Opinião	16–20 Oct 2021	2.000	–	–	19,9%	14,4%	12,4%	8,7%	1,7%	–	42,9%	5,5%
Instituto Opinião	16–20 Oct 2021	2.000	23,1%	–	15%	9,9%	9,5%	7,7%	1,2%	–	33,6%	8,1%
Instituto Plural	7–11 Aug 2021	1.000	25%	9%	11%	8%	7%	7%	–	3% (Note: Clarissa Tércio (PSC) with 3%)	21%	14%
Instituto Plural	7–11 Aug 2021	1.000	36%	–	11%	11%	–		–	–	42%	25%
Instituto Plural	7–11 Aug 2021	1.000	42%	–	–	12%	–		–	4% (Note: Clarissa Tércio (PSC) with 4%)	42%	30%

==== Second round ====
The second round (if necessary) is scheduled to take place on 30 October 2022.

Lyra vs. Arraes

Pollster/client(s)	Date(s) conducted	Sample size	Lyra PSDB	Arraes SD	Abst. Undec.	Lead
EXAME/IDEIA	3–8 Jun 2022	1.000	36%	40%	24%	4%

Lyra vs. Cabral

Pollster/client(s)	Date(s) conducted	Sample size	Lyra PSDB	Cabral PSB	Abst. Undec.	Lead
EXAME/IDEIA	3–8 Jun 2022	1.000	44%	24%	32%	20%
Paraná Pesquisas	10–14 May 2022	1.510	41,8%	20,3%	37,9%	21,5%
Paraná Pesquisas	19–24 Mar 2022	1.510	41,5%	23,4%	35,1%	18,1%
Empetec/Diário	26 Feb–4 Mar 2022	2.019	26,9%	11,9%	61,2%	15%

Lyra vs. Anderson

Pollster/client(s)	Date(s) conducted	Sample size	Lyra PSDB	Anderson PL	Abst. Undec.	Lead
EXAME/IDEIA	3–8 Jun 2022	1.000	42%	31%	27%	11%
Empetec/Diário	26 Feb–4 Mar 2022	2.019	29,3%	13%	57,7%	16,3%

Lyra vs. Coelho

Pollster/client(s)	Date(s) conducted	Sample size	Lyra PSDB	Coelho UNIÃO	Abst. Undec.	Lead
Empetec/Diário	26 Feb–4 Mar 2022	2.019	28,3%	12,3%	59,4%	16%

Cabral vs. Anderson

Pollster/client(s)	Date(s) conducted	Sample size	Cabral PSB	Anderson PL	Abst. Undec.	Lead
EXAME/IDEIA	3–8 Jun 2022	1.000	25%	26%	49%	1%
Paraná Pesquisas	10–14 May 2022	1.510	29,1%	28,1%	42,8%	1%
Paraná Pesquisas	19–24 Mar 2022	1.510	31,7%	26,3%	42%	5,4%
Empetec/Diário	26 Feb–4 Mar 2022	2.019	14,7%	14,2%	71,1%	0,5%

Cabral vs. Coelho

Pollster/client(s)	Date(s) conducted	Sample size	Cabral PSB	Coelho UNIÃO	Abst. Undec.	Lead
EXAME/IDEIA	3–8 Jun 2022	1.000	24%	29%	47%	5%
Paraná Pesquisas	10–14 May 2022	1.510	22,7%	35%	42,4%	12,3%
Paraná Pesquisas	19–24 Mar 2022	1.510	24,6%	34,8%	40,6%	10,2%
Empetec/Diário	26 Feb–4 Mar 2022	2.019	14,4%	13,6%	72%	0,8%

Arraes vs. Cabral

Pollster/client(s)	Date(s) conducted	Sample size	Arraes SD	Cabral PSB	Abst. Undec.	Lead
EXAME/IDEIA	3–8 Jun 2022	1.000	37%	22%	41%	15%
Paraná Pesquisas	10–14 May 2022	1.510	51,4%	18,7%	29,8%	32,7%

Arraes vs. Anderson

Pollster/client(s)	Date(s) conducted	Sample size	Arraes SD	Anderson PL	Abst. Undec.	Lead
EXAME/IDEIA	3–8 Jun 2022	1.000	41%	32%	27%	9%

Arraes vs. Coelho

Pollster/client(s)	Date(s) conducted	Sample size	Arraes SD	Coelho UNIÃO	Abst. Undec.	Lead
EXAME/IDEIA	3–8 Jun 2022	1.000	42%	31%	27%	11%

=== Senator ===
Pollster/client(s)	Date(s) conducted	Sample size	Armando PSDB	Leitão PT	Gilson PL	André PSD	Arraes SD	Eugênia PSOL	Lyra PSDB	Coelho Filho UNIÃO	Others	Abst. Undec.	Lead
Paraná Pesquisas	4–8 Jul 2022	1.510	18,5%	6,4%	8,2%	9,8%	–	0,5%	–	–	19,8% (Note: Mendonça Filho (UNIÃO) with 19,8%)	36,8%	1,3%
Paraná Pesquisas	4–8 Jul 2022	1.510	–	8,4%	8,9%	12,1%	–	0,8%	–	–	26% (Note: Mendonça Filho (UNIÃO) with 26%)	43,7%	13,9%
Paraná Pesquisas	4–8 Jul 2022	1.510	16,8%	7,7%	14,4%	27,9%	–	0,8%	–	–	13,7% (Note: Mendonça Filho (UNIÃO) with 13,2% and a candidate from the Brazilian Communist Party (PCB) for Senator with 0,5%) (Note: Paraná Pesquisas tested a scenario in which the names of candidates for the Federal Senate are directly linked to possible candidates for the government. In this scenario, André de Paula would be in Marília Arraes' ticket, Armando Monteiro in Raquel Lyra's ticket, Gilson Machado in Anderson Ferreira's ticket, Mendonça Filho in Miguel Coelho's ticket, Teresa Leitão in Danilo Cabral's ticket, João Arnaldo in Eugenia Lima's ticket and a generic Brazilian Communist Party (PCB) candidate on the Jones Manoel's ticket.)	18,7%	11,1%
Instituto Potencial Inteligência	24–28 Jun 2022	1.202	18,1%	15,8%	10,2%	5,2%	–	1%	–	–	–	49,7%	2,3%
Real Time Big Data	24–25 Jun 2022	1.500	21%	10%	8%	6%	–	1%	–	–	23% (Note: Mendonça Filho (UNIÃO) with 23%)	31%	2%
EXAME/IDEIA	3–8 Jun 2022	1.000	4%	7%	7%	8%	2%	2%	2%	1%	7% (Note: Luciana Santos (PCdoB) with 6% and Carlos Veras (PT) with 1%)	60%	1%
EXAME/IDEIA	3–8 Jun 2022	1.000	2%	1%	3%	3%	13%	1%	7%	1%	7,4% (Note: Anderson Ferreira (PL) with 2%; Carlos Veras (PT) with 1%; Luciana Santos (PCdoB) with 1%; Humberto Costa (PT) with 0,4% and other candidates with 3%)	65%	5,6%
Paraná Pesquisas	10–14 May 2022	1.510	–	9,8%	8,3%	14%	–	1,1%	32,8%	–	–	33,9%	18,8%
Instituto Opinião	30 Apr–2 May 2022	2.000	–	8,9%	5,8%	10,9%	–	–	–	–	15,7% (Note: Luciana Santos (PCdoB) with 11,5% and Dudu da Fonte (PP) with 4,2%)	58,7%	0,6%
Conectar	21–24 Apr 2022	1.000	–	–	7%	10%	44%	2%	–	–	–	37%	34%
Conectar	21–24 Apr 2022	1.000	–	–	7%	13%	–	2%	29%	–	–	50%	16%
Conectar	21–24 Apr 2022	1.000	–	–	8%	17%	–	3%	–	15%	–	57%	2%
Conectar	21–24 Apr 2022	1.000	–	–	8%	–	45%	2%	–	–	6% (Note: Luciana Santos (PCdoB) with 6%)	40%	37%
Conectar	21–24 Apr 2022	1.000	–	–	10%	–	–	2%	29%	–	10% (Note: Luciana Santos (PCdoB) with 10%)	50%	19%
Conectar	21–24 Apr 2022	1.000	–	–	11%	–	–	3%	–	18%	13% (Note: Luciana Santos (PCdoB) with 13%)	55%	5%
Conectar	21–24 Apr 2022	1.000	–	–	9%	–	44%	2%	–	–	4% (Note: Carlos Veras (PT) with 4%)	40%	35%
Conectar	21–24 Apr 2022	1.000	–	–	11%	–	–	3%	30%	–	4% (Note: Carlos Veras (PT) with 4%)	52%	19%
Conectar	21–24 Apr 2022	1.000	–	–	12%	–	–	5%	–	20%	5% (Note: Carlos Veras (PT) with 5%)	58%	8%
25 Mar 2022		Marília Arraes leaves the Workers' Party and joins Solidariedade, in order to run for the 2022 Pernambuco gubernatorial election.											
Pollster/client(s)	Date(s) conducted	Sample size	Armando PSDB	Veras PT	Daniel Cidadania	André PSD	Arraes PT	Anderson PL	Gilson PSC	Luciana PCdoB	Others	Abst. Undec.	Lead
Paraná Pesquisas	19–24 Mar 2022	1.510	–	2,3%	–	14%	46,2%	–	5,4%	–	1,4% (Note: Eugênia Lima (PSOL) with 1,4%)	30,8%	32,2%
Paraná Pesquisas	19–24 Mar 2022	1.510	–	3%	–	14,8%	–	–	5,8%	–	41,8% (Note: Raquel Lyra (PSDB) with 39,9% and Eugênia Lima (PSOL) with 1,9%)	34,7%	27%
Paraná Pesquisas	19–24 Mar 2022	1.510	–	–	–	14,3%	47%	–	5,6%	–	1,9% (Note: Eugênia Lima (PSOL) with 1,9%)	31,1%	32,7%
Empetec/Diário	26 Feb–4 Mar 2022	2.019	13%	1%	4,1%	2,7%	25,8%	5%	0,6%	–	5,4% (Note: Wolney Queiroz (PDT) with 3,6%; Dudu da Fonte (PP) with 1,1%; Sílvio Costa Filho (Republicanos) with 0,6% and Eugênia Lima (PSOL) with 0,1%)	42,4%	12,8%
Instituto Simplex	22–25 Feb 2022	2.401	7,53%	–	2,76%	1,87%	14,21%	6,25%	2,85%	1,6%	3,55% (Note: Wolney Queiroz (PDT) with 2,26% and Sílvio Costa Filho (Republicanos) with 1,29%)	57,77%	6,68%
Instituto Opinião	17–20 Feb 2022	2.000	21,2%	–	–	–	26,1%	–	3,9%	–	3,3% (Note: Magno Martins (Ind.) with 2,5% and Eugênia Lima (PSOL) with 0,8%)	45,5%	4,9%
Instituto Opinião	17–20 Feb 2022	2.000	26,2%	–	–	–	–	–	5%	–	12% (Note: Teresa Leitão (PT) with 6,4%; Magno Martins (Ind.) with 4% and Eugênia Lima (PSOL) with 1,6%)	56,8%	14,2%
Instituto Opinião	17–20 Feb 2022	2.000	26,9%	4,1%	–	–	–	–	4,8%	–	5,4% (Note: Magno Martins (Ind.) with 3,8% and Eugênia Lima (PSOL) with 1,6%)	58,8%	21,5%
Instituto Opinião	17–20 Feb 2022	2.000	26,4%	–	–	4,6%	–	–	5,1%	–	6,1% (Note: Magno Martins (Ind.) with 4,2% and Eugênia Lima (PSOL) with 1,9%)	57,8%	20,3%
Instituto Opinião	17–20 Feb 2022	2.000	26,5%	–	–	–	–	–	5%	–	13,2% (Note: Dudu da Fonte (PP) with 7,3%; Magno Martins (Ind.) with 3,8% and Eugênia Lima (PSOL) with 2,1%)	55,3%	13,3%
Instituto Opinião	17–20 Feb 2022	2.000	27,1%	–	–	–	–	–	5,5%	–	11,2% (Note: Sílvio Costa Filho (Republicanos) with 4,5%; Magno Martins (Ind.) with 4,3% and Eugênia Lima (PSOL) with 2,4%)	56,2%	15,9%
Instituto Opinião	17–20 Feb 2022	2.000	22,6%	–	–	–	23,1%	4,8%	–	–	5,2% (Note: Magno Martins (Ind.) with 4% and Eugênia Lima (PSOL) with 1,2%)	44,3%	0,5%
Instituto Opinião	17–20 Feb 2022	2.000	27,7%	3,4%	–	–	–	6,6%	–	–	6,7% (Note: Magno Martins (Ind.) with 4,5% and Eugênia Lima (PSOL) with 2,2%)	55,6%	21%
Instituto Opinião	17–20 Feb 2022	2.000	27,1%	–	–	–	–	6,8%	–	–	11,7% (Note: Teresa Leitão (PT) with 5%; Magno Martins (Ind.) with 4,5% and Eugênia Lima (PSOL) with 2,2%)	54,4%	15,4%
Instituto Opinião	17–20 Feb 2022	2.000	28,1%	–	–	3,2%	–	6,6%	–	–	6,8% (Note: Magno Martins (Ind.) with 4,8% and Eugênia Lima (PSOL) with 2%)	55,3%	21,3%
Instituto Opinião	17–20 Feb 2022	2.000	27,6%	–	–	–	–	6,7%	–	–	11% (Note: Dudu da Fonte (PP) with 4,7%; Magno Martins (Ind.) with 4,3% and Eugênia Lima (PSOL) with 2%)	54,7%	16,6%
Instituto Opinião	17–20 Feb 2022	2.000	28%	–	–	–	–	7%	–	–	10,1% (Note: Magno Martins (Ind.) with 4,6%; Sílvio Costa Filho (Republicanos) with 3,5% and Eugênia Lima (PSOL) with 2%)	54,9%	21%
Instituto Plural	7–11 Aug 2021	1.000	–	–	–	5%	44%	10%	–	–	7% (Note: Sílvio Costa Filho (Republicanos) with 7%)	34%	34%

== Results ==
=== Governor ===
Candidate	Running mate	Party	First round		Second round	
Candidate	Running mate	Party	Votes	%	Votes	%
Raquel Lyra	Priscila Krause (Cidadania)	PSDB	1,009,556	20.58	3,113,415	58.70
Marília Arraes	Sebastião Oliveira (Avante)	Solidariedade	1,175,651	23.97	2,190,264	41.30
Anderson Ferreira	Izabel Urquiza	PL	890,220	18.15		
Danilo Cabral	Luciana Santos (PCdoB)	PSB	885,994	18.06		
Miguel Coelho	Alessandra Vieira	UNIÃO	884,941	18.04		
Jones Manoel	Raline Almeida	PCB	33,931	0.69		
João Arnaldo	Alice Gabino (REDE)	PSOL	12,558	0.26		
Wellington Carneiro	Carol Tosaka	PTB	8,020	0.16		
Jadilson Andrade	Fernanda Souto	PMB	2,435	0.05		
Claudia Ribeiro	José Mariano	PSTU	1,745	0.04		
Total			4,905,051	100.00	5,303,679	100.00
Valid votes			4,905,051	85.57	5,303,679	91.52
Invalid votes			543,922	9.49	377,950	6.52
Blank votes			283,316	4.94	113,730	1.96
Total votes			5,732,289	100.00	5,795,359	100.00
Registered voters/turnout			7,018,098	81.68	7,018,098	82.58
PSDB gain from PSB						

Popular vote (first round)
Arraes	23.97%
Lyra	20.58%
Ferreira	18.15%
Cabral	18.06%
Coelho	18.04%
Others	1.20%

Popular vote (second round)
Lyra	58.70%
Arraes	41.30%

=== Senator ===
Candidate	Party	Votes	%
Teresa Leitão	PT	2,061,276	46.13
Gilson Machado	PL	1,320,555	29.55
André de Paula	PSD	567,367	12.70
Carlos Andrade Lima	UNIÃO	258,289	5.78
Guilherme Coelho	PSDB	187,364	4.19
Eugênia Lima	PSOL	45,358	1.02
Esteves Jacinto	PRTB	15,701	0.35
Dayse Medeiros	PSTU	12,844	0.29
Roberta Rita	PCO	666	
Total		4,468,754	100.00
Valid votes		4,468,754	77.96
Invalid votes		705,926	12.31
Blank votes		557,609	9.73
Total votes		5,732,289	100.00
Registered voters/turnout		7,018,098	81.68
PT gain from MDB			

Popular vote
Leitão	46.12%
Machado	29.55%
Paula	12.69%
Others	11.63%

=== Chamber of Deputies ===
Party or alliance		Votes	%	Seats	+/–
Brazilian Socialist Party		727,527	14.64	5	Steady
Progressistas		681,164	13.71	4	▲2
Liberal Party		636,231	12.80	4	▲3
Brazil Union		461,431	9.28	3	New
Republicanos		416,059	8.37	2	Steady
Brazil of Hope	Workers' Party	355,602	7.16	1	▼1
Brazil of Hope	Green Party	116,478	2.34	1	▲1
Brazil of Hope	Communist Party of Brazil	63,854	1.28	1	Steady
Brazilian Democratic Movement		259,476	5.22	1	Steady
Avante		225,100	4.53	1	▲1
Solidariedade		196,762	3.96	1	Steady
Podemos		156,384	3.15	0	▼1
PSOL REDE	Sustainability Network	151,812	3.05	1	▲1
PSOL REDE	Socialism and Liberty Party	115,062	2.32	0	Steady
Democratic Labour Party		140,384	2.82	0	Steady
Always Forward	Cidadania	114,121	2.30	0	▼1
Always Forward	Brazilian Social Democracy Party	27,826	0.56	0	Steady
Brazilian Labour Renewal Party		51,142	1.03	0	Steady
Patriota		16,122	0.32	0	▼1
New Party		12,947	0.26	0	Steady
Party of National Mobilization		10,080	0.20	0	Steady
Social Democratic Party		6,246	0.13	0	▼1
Social Christian Party		6,176	0.12	0	▼1
Brazilian Labour Party		5,598	0.11	0	Steady
Brazilian Communist Party		3,873	0.08	0	Steady
Agir		3,609	0.07	0	Steady
Popular Unity		3,376	0.07	0	New
Christian Democracy		3,140	0.06	0	Steady
United Socialist Workers' Party		1,873	0.04	0	Steady
Brazilian Woman's Party		408	0.01	0	Steady
Republican Party of the Social Order		0	0.00	0	Steady
Workers' Cause Party		0	0.00	0	Steady
Total		4,969,863	100.00	25	–
Valid votes		4,969,863	86.70		
Invalid votes		346,902	6.05		
Blank votes		415,524	7.25		
Total votes		5,732,289	100.00		
Registered voters/turnout		7,018,098	81.68		

=== Legislative Assembly ===
Party or alliance		Votes	%	Seats	+/–
Brazilian Socialist Party		1,237,696	24.87	14	▲3
Progressistas		738,630	14.84	8	▼2
Brazil Union		484,166	9.73	5	New
Liberal Party		456,482	9.17	5	▲3
Brazil of Hope	Workers' Party	446,662	8.97	3	Steady
Brazil of Hope	Green Party	163,373	3.28	3	▲3
Brazil of Hope	Communist Party of Brazil	88,569	1.78	1	Steady
Solidariedade		348,740	7.01	3	▲2
Republicanos		246,553	4.95	2	▲1
Always Forward	Brazilian Social Democracy Party	227,888	4.58	3	▲2
Always Forward	Cidadania	62,103	1.25	0	Steady
Patriota		165,178	3.32	1	▲1
PSOL REDE	Socialism and Liberty Party	86,445	1.74	1	Steady
PSOL REDE	Sustainability Network	48,475	0.97	0	Steady
Democratic Labour Party		73,659	1.48	0	▼1
Social Democratic Party		32,050	0.64	0	▼3
Avante		24,688	0.50	0	▼1
Brazilian Labour Renewal Party		11,816	0.24	0	▼1
Agir		7,991	0.16	0	Steady
Brazilian Labour Party		6,299	0.13	0	▼2
Brazilian Communist Party		5,905	0.12	0	Steady
Brazilian Woman's Party		4,465	0.09	0	Steady
Christian Democracy		2,602	0.05	0	Steady
Party of National Mobilization		2,436	0.05	0	Steady
Popular Unity		2,048	0.04	0	Steady
United Socialist Workers' Party		1,688	0.03	0	Steady
Republican Party of the Social Order		1,054	0.02	0	Steady
Workers' Cause Party		0	0.00	0	Steady
Total		4,977,661	100.00	49	–
Valid votes		5,013,585	87.46		
Invalid votes		314,161	5.48		
Blank votes		404,543	7.06		
Total votes		5,732,289	100.00		
Registered voters/turnout		7,018,098	81.68		
