= Anderson Ferreira (politician) =

Brazilian politician (born 1972)

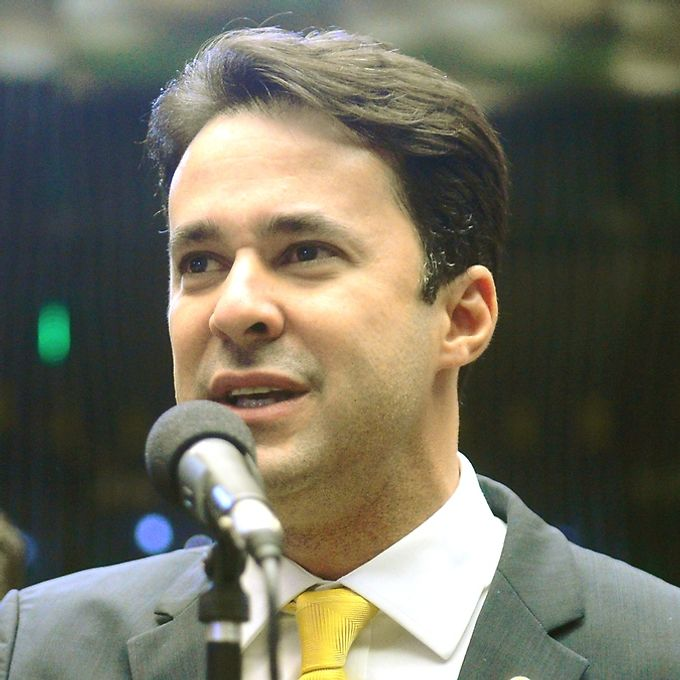
- Ferreira in 2016

Member-elect of the Chamber of Deputies
- Assuming office 1 February 2027
- Constituency: Pernambuco
- In office 1 February 2011 – 1 January 2017
- Constituency: Pernambuco

Mayor of Jaboatão dos Guararapes
- In office 1 January 2017 – 31 March 2022
- Vice Mayor: Ricardo Valois; Mano Medeiros
- Preceded by: Elias Gomes
- Succeeded by: Mano Medeiros

Personal details
- Born: Anderson Ferreira Rodrigues; 10 December 1972 (age 53) Recife, Pernambuco, Brazil
- Party: PL (since 2007)
- Other political affiliations: PP (1999–2005); PMN (2005–2007)
- Relatives: André Ferreira (twin brother)

Anderson Ferreira Rodrigues (born 10 December 1972) is a Brazilian politician. From 2011 to 2017, he was a member of the Chamber of Deputies. From 2017 to 2022, he served as mayor of Jaboatão dos Guararapes. In the 2022 gubernatorial election, he was a candidate for governor of Pernambuco. He is the son of Manoel Ferreira da Silva and the twin brother of André Ferreira.

Political offices
Preceded by Elias Gomes	Mayor of Jaboatão dos Guararapes; 2017–2022	Succeeded by Mano Medeiros
