= Guilherme Uchoa =

Brazilian politician and judge (1947–2018)

Guilherme Uchoa (April 22, 1947 – July 3, 2018) was a Brazilian politician and former judge. Uchoa served as the President of the Legislative Assembly of Pernambuco for six consecutive terms until his death in office in 2018. He was first elected to the state Legislative Assembly of Pernambuco in 1994.

Uchoa was born in the city of Timbaúba, Pernambuco, on April 22, 1947. He received a law degree from the Federal University of Pernambuco in Recife and also held a history degree from the Faculty of Philosophy, Sciences and Letters in Caruaru.

Uchoa first worked as a clerk for the police. He then served as a Pernambuca state judge from April 15, 1985, until March 31, 1992, before entering politics in the early 1990s. In 1994, Guilherme Uchoa was elected to his first term in the Legislative Assembly of Pernambuco.

Uchoa served as the President of the Legislative Assembly of Pernambuco for six consecutive terms until his death in 2018. He was a close ally of former Governor of Pernambuco Eduardo Campos (PSB), who died in a 2014 plane crash, and Campos' successor, incumbent Governor Paulo Câmara (PBS). Uchoa, who was particularly close with Campos, helped to shepherd much of Campos' and Câmara's legislation through the state assembly.

A longtime member of the Democratic Labour Party (PDT), Uchoa has recently joined the Social Christian Party (PSC) in 2018 to run for re-election.

Uchoa was hospitalized with pulmonary edema on Sunday, July 1, 2018. He died from the illness at Real Hospital Português de Beneficência in Recife on July 3, 2018, at the age of 71. He was survived by his wife, two children, and six grandchildren.

Pernambuco Governor Paulo Câmara declared five days of official mourning following Uchoa's death. A public viewing was held at the state Legislative Assembly building in Recife. Uchoa was buried at a cemetery in the city of Igarassu.
