= Raquel Lyra =

Brazilian politician (born 1978)

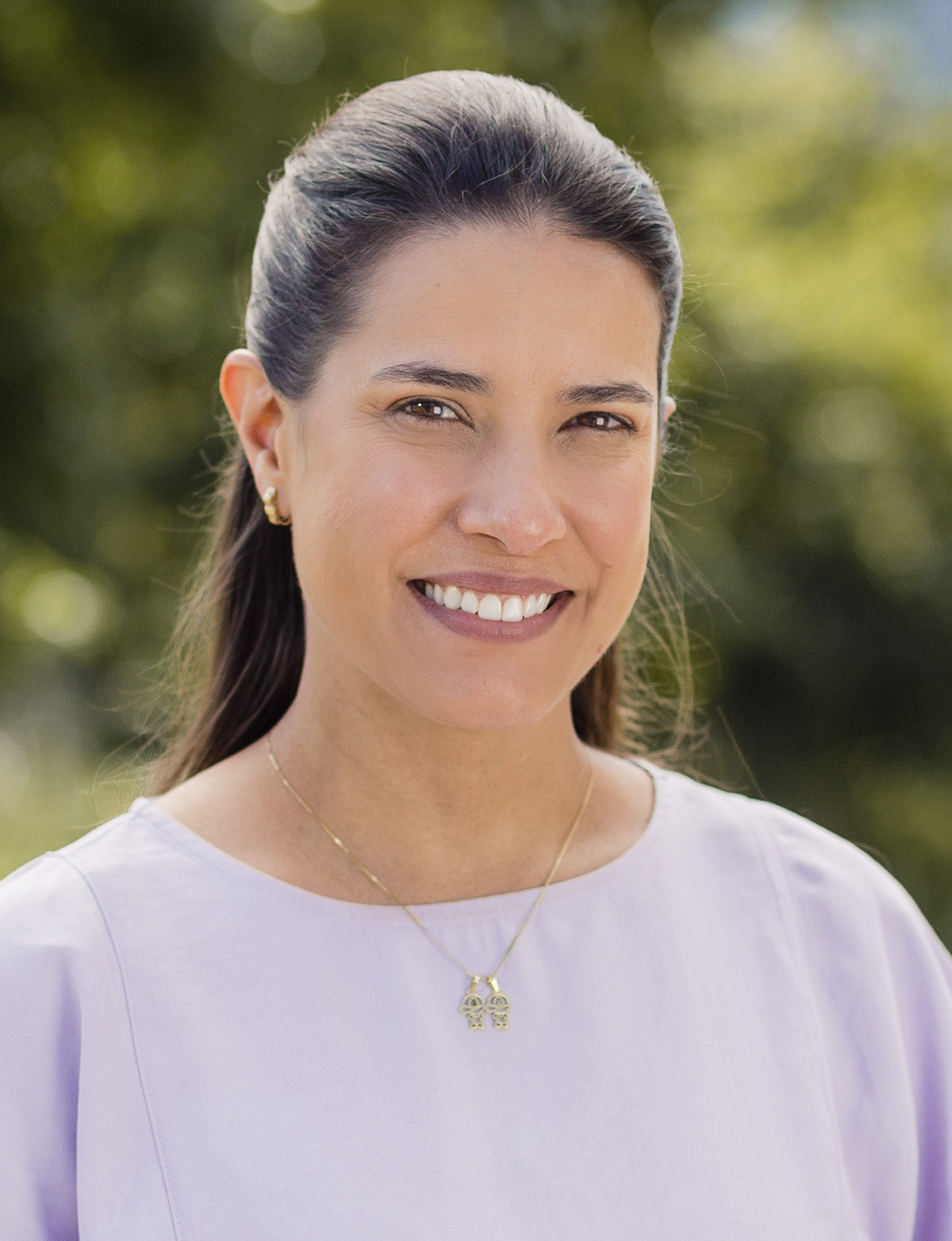

Governor of Pernambuco
- Incumbent
- Assumed office 1 January 2023
- Vice Governor: Priscila Krause
- Preceded by: Paulo Câmara

Mayor of Caruaru
- In office 1 January 2017 – 31 March 2022
- Vice Mayor: Rodrigo Pinheiro
- Preceded by: José Queiroz de Lima
- Succeeded by: Rodrigo Pinheiro

State Deputy of Pernambuco
- In office 1 January 2011 – 31 December 2016
- Constituency: At-large

Personal details
- Born: Raquel Teixeira Lyra; 2 December 1978 (age 47) Recife, Pernambuco, Brazil
- Party: PSD (since 2025)
- Other political affiliations: PSB (2007–2016); PSDB (2016–2025)
- Spouse: Fernando Lucena (died 2022)
- Children: 2
- Relatives: Fernando Lyra (uncle)
- Education: Federal University of Pernambuco

Raquel Teixeira Lyra Lucena (born 2 December 1978) is a Brazilian lawyer and politician who has served as governor of Pernambuco since 2023. She is a member of the Social Democratic Party (PSD).

Born in Recife and raised in Caruaru, Lyra studied law and became a delegate of the Federal Police. She later worked positions in the state government of Eduardo Campos. A member of a political family, she is the daughter of former governor João Lyra Neto. She was elected state deputy in 2010 as a member of the Brazilian Socialist Party (PSB). During her first term, she served as Pernambuco's Secretary of Children and Youth from 2011 to 2012, and was reelected in 2014.

Lyra left the PSB in 2016 and joined the Brazilian Social Democratic Party (PSDB). That year she was elected mayor of Caruaru in a runoff, becoming the first woman to hold the office, and was reelected in 2020. She resigned in 2022 to run for governor of Pernambuco. After finishing second in the first round, she defeated Marília Arraes in the runoff with 58.70%, becoming the first female governor of Pernambuco.

Lyra joined the PSD in 2025. As governor, she won reelection in 2026, defeating former Recife mayor João Campos in the first round, with 53.27% of the vote.

== Early life and career ==
Raquel Teixeira Lyra Lucena was born on December 2, 1978 in Recife, the youngest of three daughters of Mércia Teixeira Lyra and João Lyra Neto.

The Lyra family has a history in Pernambuco politics. Her father and her grandfather, João Lyra Filho, both served as mayor of Caruaru, while her uncle Fernando Lyra served as federal deputy and Minister of Justice under President José Sarney. Lyra accompanied her family in political events from childhood, starting with the 1989 Brazilian presidential election where her family had joined the Democratic Labour Party (PDT) and supported Leonel Brizola, with her uncle Fernando being Brizola's vice-presidential nominee.

She is of Portuguese, Azorean, and Atikum ancestry.

=== Education ===
Lyra was eduated in a montessori school in Caruaru, but moved to Recife to study at a more rigorous school, preparing for college entrance exams. She initially studied both law and business administration at the Federal University of Pernambuco, but focused only on law by the time she graduated in 2000. Lyra also obtained a postgraduate degree in business and economic law in 2003 from the Fundação Getulio Vargas.

=== Legal career ===
Lyra began practicing law in 2000, after completing an internship with the Federal Public Prosecutor's Office. She then passed a competitive exam to work at the Bank of the Northeast, before passing an exam in 2002 to become a Federal Police delegate. Lyra worked in the financial crimes division in Recife and Rio de Janeiro.

Lyra passed the exam to become a state attorney for Pernambuco in 2005. While still a state attorney, Lyra joined the Brazilian Socialist Party (PSB) in 2007. She became the head of the Legislative-Legal Support Prosecutor's Office of Eduardo Campos, where her father João Lyra Neto was the vice governor.

== Early political career ==
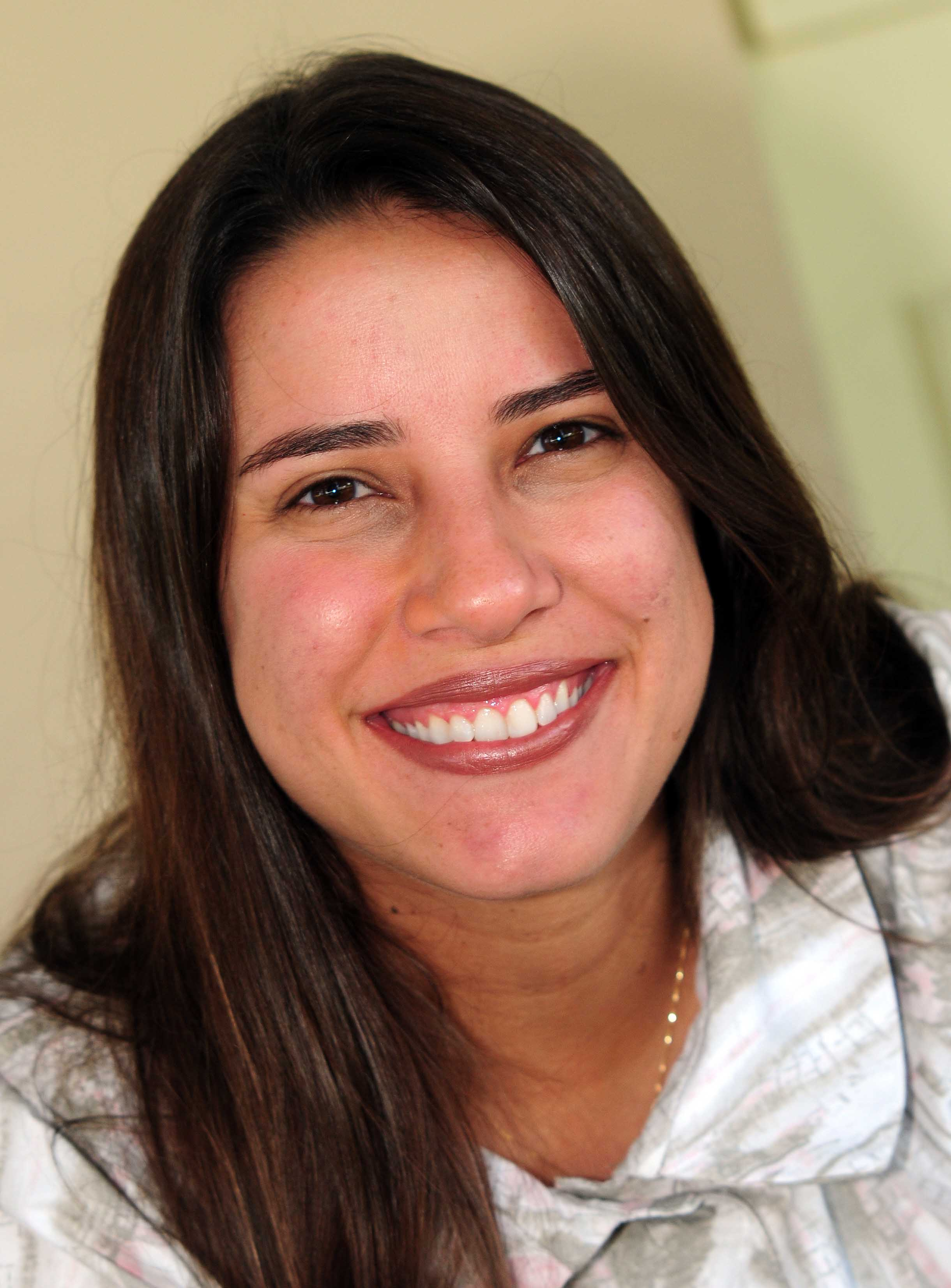
Lyra as a candidate during the 2010 election.

In 2010, Lyra left her position in the Campos administration to run for state deputy. Her campaign centered on reducing social inequalities within the state. She was elected with 49,610 votes, the 18th most voted elected deputy. 63% of her votes came from Caruaru where she was the top voted candidate. Lyra was also the top voted woman statewide.

=== Secretary of Children and Youth ===
After assuming office in the Legislative Assembly, Lyra took leave 8 days into her term to assume the position as Secretary of Children and Youth in the cabinet of Eduardo Campos.

During Lyra's tenure, the secretariat implemented social programs, including Minha Certidão, which connected maternity hospitals with civil registries to allow birth certificates to be issued before newborns were discharged, and Casas da Juventude, which partnered with municipal governments to provide courses, workshops, and other services to young people. The secretariat also asssited municipalities with childcare center renovations and trainings for early childhood educators and received R$1.2 from Petrobras for its youth sports initiative.

In February 2012, Lyra was elected president of the National Forum for Youth Policy Managers, taking office in May. She left the Campos cabinet during the December 2012 reshuffle following the 2012 municipal elections, being replaced at the secretariat by former state deputy Pedro Eurico.

=== Term in legislative assembly ===
After leaving state government, Lyra's leave ended and she returned to the legislature. In February 2013, she was elected president of the Committee on Constitution, Legislation, and Justice. During her first term, Lyra authored legislation that regulated transitions between outgoing and incoming state and municipal government.

Lyra's father became governor of Pernambuco in April 2014 when Eduardo Campos resigned to run for president in the 2014 general elections. Campos died in a plane crash before the election, but his designated successor Paulo Câmara won the state gubernatorial election that year.

In the 2014 elections, Lyra herself was reelected with 80,789 votes, the third highest total statewide. She gained support outside Caruaru, but was not the most voted candidate in the city, where she received 28,280 votes in comparison to former mayor Tony Gel's 31,426.

In her second term, Lyra was reelected president of the Justice Committee. Among legislation she authored during her second term were a law requiring the use of metal detectors in state public examinations and another reserving 10% of state apprenticeship positions for adolescents with disabilities.

== Mayor of Caruaru ==
=== 2016 election ===
==== Nomination battle ====
In 2015, Lyra began seeking the PSB nomination for mayor of Caruaru to succeed incumbent mayor Zé Queiroz of the Democratic Labour Party (PDT) in the 2016 election. Queiroz's vice mayor, Jorge Gomes, also of the PSB, sought the party nomination. The race continued rivalries between the Lyra and Queiroz families in Caruaru, along with Tony Gel of the PMDB. Queiroz's alliance with the PSB had complicated Lyra's plans and by August 2015 she was openly suggesting joining the centrist Brazilian Social Democracy Party (PSDB).

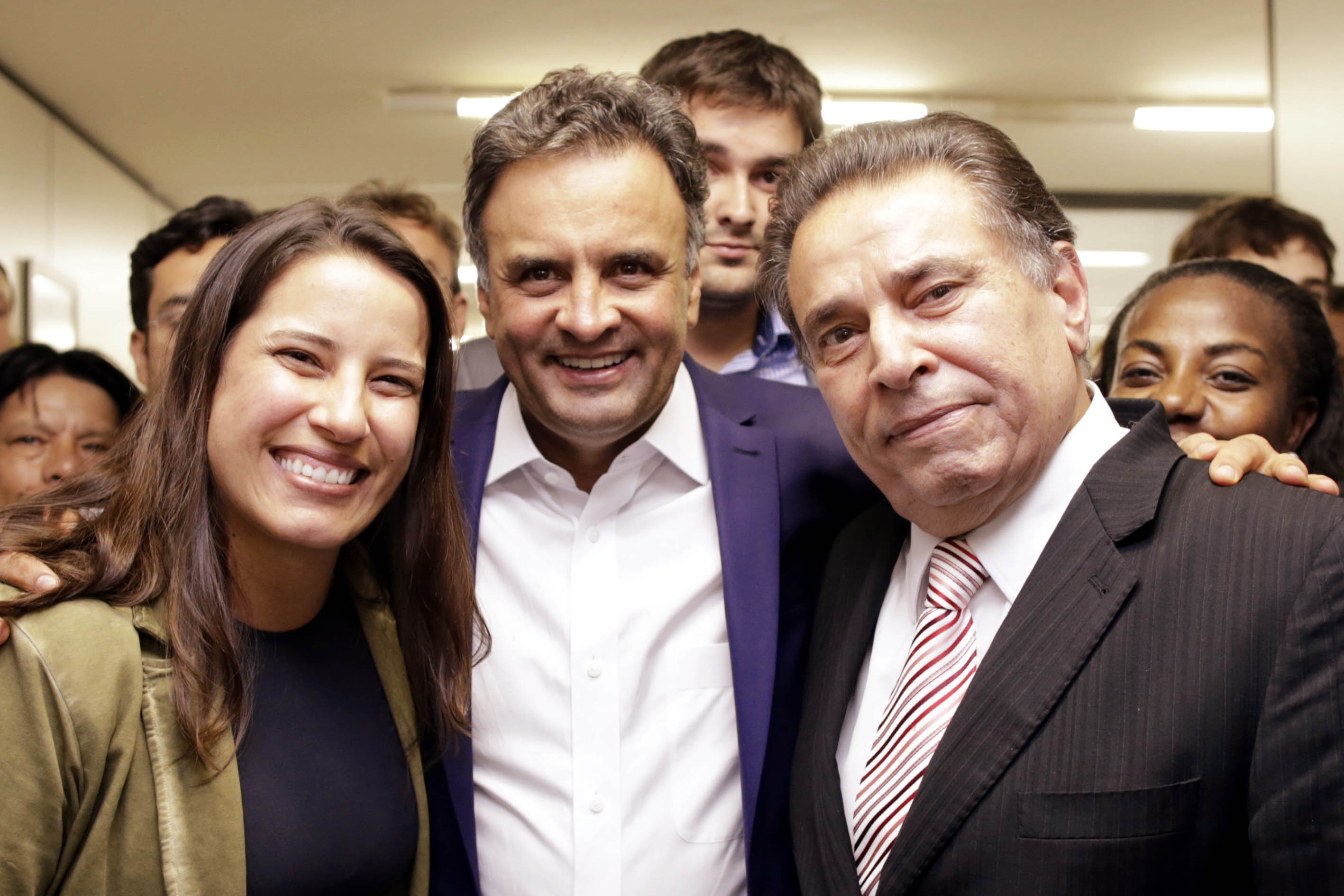
Lyra (left), Aécio Neves (center), and João Lyra Neto (right) during the 2014 Brazilian general election.

Lyra assumed leadership of the municipal PSB in November 2015, but the party leadership including Paulo Câmara informed her in March 2016 that they would not support her. She attributed the decision to an agreement to oppose her candidacy between the PDT and PSB in exchange for the PDT to support Geraldo Júlio for Mayor of Recife. On 17 March 2016, Lyra and her father joined the PSDB in Brasília following discussions with the party president Aécio Neves that assured her candidacy.

==== Campaign ====
On 5 August 2016, the PSDB formally nominated Lyra for mayor, with businessman Rodrigo Pinheiro as her running mate, at a party convention in Caruaru. Her candidacy was supported by a coalition of eleven parties, including the PSDB, PTB, DEM and PROS. Public security and the conditions of the city's traditional commercial markets were prominent campaign issues, with candidates debating rising violence and the infrastructure of the Feira da Sulanca. Lyra faced several opponents, including former mayor Tony Gel, police delegate Erick Lessa and Queiroz's preferred successor, Jorge Gomes.

=== Second term (2021–2022) ===
Lyra was elected mayor of her hometown Caruaru in 2017 with 53.15% of the vote. She is the first woman to be elected as a mayor of Caruaru.

== Governor of Pernambuco ==
In 31 March 2022 she resigned to the office of mayor of Caruaru in order to run in the 2022 Pernambuco gubernatorial election as a candidate. She finished the first round of the elections in the second place, with 20.58% of the valid votes, and advanced to a run-off in the second round with Marília Arraes, a member of Solidariedade.

Raquel was elected governor of Pernambuco on 30 October 2022, after obtaining 58.70% of the valid votes in the second round and defeating Marília Arraes, who obtained 41.30% of the votes. She is the first female governor of the state of Pernambuco.

== Personal life ==
Lyra is the daughter of former mayor of Caruaru and former Governor of Pernambuco João Lyra Neto. She is the widow of Fernando Lucena who died on the day of the first round of the 2022 Brazilian general election. She has two sons: Fernando Jr. and João.

== Electoral history ==
Year	Election	Party	Office	Coalition	Partners	Party	Votes	Percent	Result
2010	State Election of Pernambuco	PSB	State Deputy	Pernambuco Popular Front (PRB, PP, PDT, PT, PTB, PSC, PR, PSB, PCdoB)	—N/a		49,610	1.10%	Elected
2014	State Election of Pernambuco	PSB	State Deputy	Pernambuco Popular Front for State Deputy (PSB, PMDB, PCdoB, PR, PSD, PSDB, PPL, DEM, PEN, PTC)	—N/a		80,879	1.76%	Elected
2016	Municipal Election of Caruaru	PSDB	Mayor	Together for Caruaru (PRB, PSL, PTN, DEM, PRTB, PMN, PSDB, Patriota, PTdoB, PROS, PTB)	Rodrigo Pinheiro	PSDB	44,776	26.08%	Runoff
2016	Municipal Election of Caruaru	PSDB	Mayor	Together for Caruaru (PRB, PSL, PTN, DEM, PRTB, PMN, PSDB, Patriota, PTdoB, PROS, PTB)	Rodrigo Pinheiro	PSDB	93,803	53.15%	Elected
2020	Municipal Election of Caruaru	PSDB	Mayor	All for Caruaru (Cidadania, DEM, PSDB, PTB, PODE, PSC, PL, PRTB, PMB, Avante, PMN, Patriota)	Rodrigo Pinheiro	PSDB	114,466	66.86%	Elected
2022	State Election of Pernambuco	PSDB	Governor	Pernambuco Wants to Change (PSDB Cidadania Fdr., PRTB)	Priscila Krause	Cidadania	1,009,556	20.58%	Runoff
2022	State Election of Pernambuco	PSDB	Governor	Pernambuco Wants to Change (PSDB Cidadania Fdr., PRTB)	Priscila Krause	Cidadania	3,113,415	58.70%	Elected
2026	State Election of Pernambuco	PSD	Governor	Pernambuco of Heart (PSD, UPB (UNIÃO & PP), PODE, and AVANTE)	Priscila Krause	PSD	2,805,438	53.27%	Elected

Political offices
Preceded by José Queiroz de Lima	Mayor of Caruaru; 2017–2022	Succeeded by Rodrigo Pinheiro
Preceded by Paulo Câmara	Governor of Pernambuco; 2023–present	Incumbent
