= War of the Mascates =

Armed conflict in Portuguese America

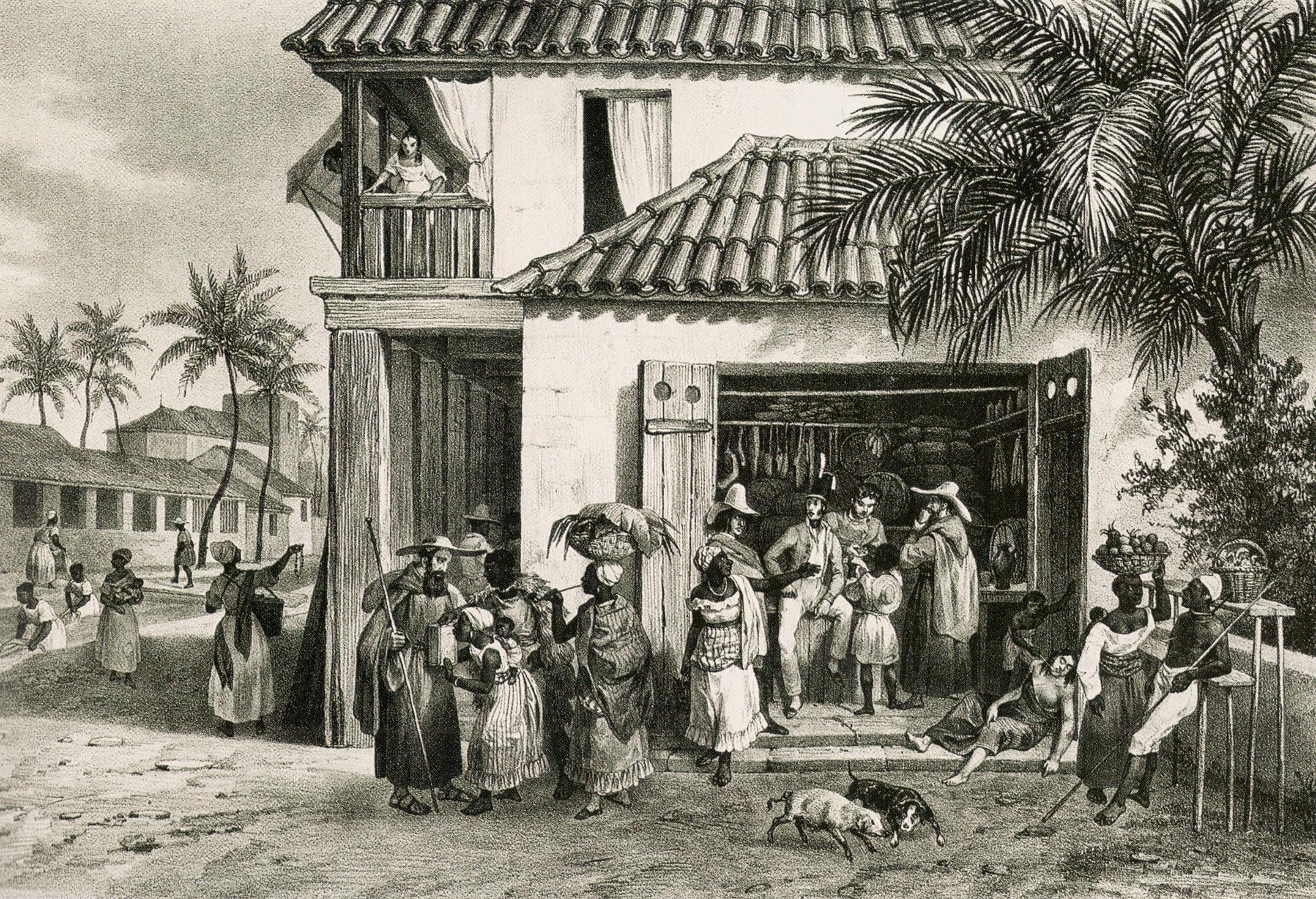

The War of the Mascates might be more accurately called an insurrection; the main events occurred in and around Recife, Pernambuco during 1710 and 1711. Some consider the underlying causes lasted for two centuries. The two sides were the landed elites, often referred to as senhores de engenho, and the merchants of Recife.

== Intro ==
The twentieth century historian C. R. Boxer, in describing the coeval accounts of the War of the Mascates commented: "So much hard lying is involved in this conflict of evidence that the exact truth is probably unascertainable..."

The War of the Mascates evidences the tensions between the landed elites in colonial Brazil and the mascates (merchants) of Recife. The "war" (there was considerable shooting but little loss of life) has elements of class struggle. Moreover, although Recife and Olinda were far from the goldfields, to an arguable extent the War of the Mascates can be seen as a parallel to the War of the Emboabas between people born in Brazilian and newcomers. To the extent that is true, it shows effects of the gold rush were felt in Pernambuco, many miles from the goldfields.

After the expulsion of the Dutch, Olinda, then the capital of Pernambuco and the civic and religious center, was left in shambles. Yet Olinda was the municipality of the planters, the local aristocracy. Recife, the port facility for Olinda, had formerly consisted of a few modest dwellings, warehouses, and businesses catering to ships and seamen. It had been developed by the Dutch into a thriving center of commerce populated by wealthy, mostly recently arrived merchants. The investment required to build, operate, and maintain an engenho had always been high and the discovery of gold and the subsequent demand for slaves had driven up the cost of slaves significantly, which further indebted the planters to the merchants.

== The events ==
The governor, Sebastião de Castro e Caldas, was appointed by the crown. The local municipal offices were controlled by the planters. The wealthy merchants resented the political controls exercised by the planters, and the planters resented being indebted to the merchants. The governors frequently favored wealthy merchants.

In 1710, after many denied requests, the crown granted Recife municipal status. The governor, anticipating resistance from the planters, decided on a secret and clumsy strategy to implement the new municipality. The planters seized upon his secrecy to contend that the new status for Recife had not been authorized by the king. The planters reacted, the governor reacted, the governor was shot at and decamped to Bahia. The planters attacked Recife, although serious violence was averted by clerical intercession. The planters and their allies regrouped in Olinda where, in a precursor to the declaration of an independent republic in the nineteenth century, there was at least a minimally credible suggestion that Pernambuco be declared an independent republic.

For several months the situation was subdued, but then the merchants and their allies rebelled. After some minimal violence, the planters and their adherents laid siege to Recife, and additionally to some other areas adhering to the mascates, such as the fortress of Tamandaré. The siege succeeded in isolating and inconveniencing the residents of Recife but despite a need to subsist mostly by eating shellfish and other seafood, Recife was able to sustain itself until the crown-appointed new governor arrived. The new governor, Felix Machado, came with a pardon for the rebels and relative peace was restored temporarily. However, the municipal status of Recife was also affirmed and the planters again took offense. Felix Machado, who would be remembered as one of the worst governors of Pernambuco, sided with the merchants and persecuted the planters. He too like his predecessor, Sebastiåo de Castro, accrued an attempted assassination.

However accurate or exaggerated the descriptions of the depravity of governor Felix Machado, his excesses were eventually quelled when António de Albuquerque, twice governor of Rio de Janeiro, stopped in Pernambuco en route to Lisbon. Apprised of the situation he presented his Pernambucan relative's case to the king. The king issued a new set of instructions to Governor Felix Machado, freeing a shipload of planters who were already chained and on board a ship about to sail to Portugal. In 1715 the crown dispatched a new governor to replace Felix Machado and residents of Pernambuco finally felt the troubles were ended, though many families of the colony's elites were ruined.

== See also ==
- History of Pernambuco
- Captaincies of Brazil
- Politics of Pernambuco
