= André Ferreira (politician) =

Brazilian politician (born 1972)

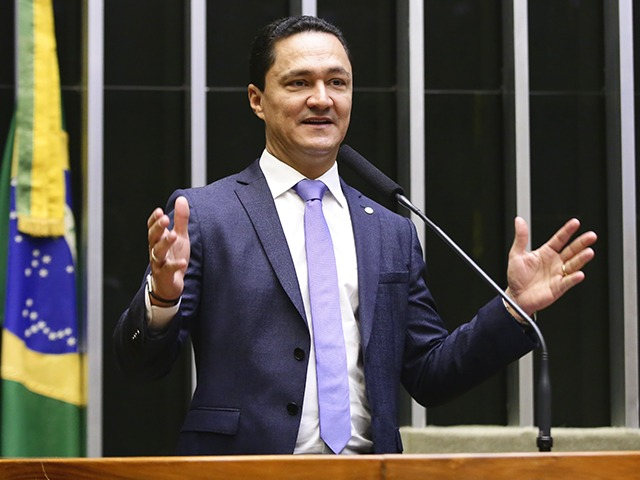
- Ferreira in 2019

Member of the Chamber of Deputies
- Incumbent
- Assumed office 1 February 2019
- Constituency: Pernambuco

Personal details
- Born: 10 December 1972 (age 53)
- Party: Liberal Party (since 2022)
- Relatives: Anderson Ferreira (twin brother)

André Ferreira Rodrigues (born 10 December 1972) is a Brazilian politician serving as a member of the Chamber of Deputies since 2019. From 2015 to 2019, he was a member of the Legislative Assembly of Pernambuco.
