= Teresa Leitão =

Brazilian politician

- Official portrait

Senator for Pernambuco
- Incumbent
- Assumed office 1 February 2023

Personal details
- Born: 7 October 1951 (age 74) Recife, Pernambuco, Brazil
- Party: PT (2000–present)
- Profession: Professor

Maria Teresa Leitão de Melo (born 7 October 1951) is a Brazilian politician from the Workers' Party. She has represented Pernambuco in the Federal Senate since the 2022 general election.

== See also ==
- 57th Legislature of the National Congress
