= André Ferreira (footballer, born 1990) =

Portuguese footballer (born 1990)

Personal information
- Full name: André Francisco Bruno Ferreira
- Date of birth: 15 June 1990 (age 36)
- Place of birth: Santarém, Portugal
- Height: 1.82 m (5 ft 11 1/2 in)
- Position: Winger

Youth career
- 1998−2004: Quarteirense
- 2004−2009: Farense

Senior career*
Years	Team	Apps	(Gls)
2009–2010	Quarteirense	23	(5)
2010–2011	Portosantense	31	(7)
2011−2014	Marítimo B	64	(6)
2014	Marítimo	1	(1)
2015	Aiginiakos	9	(0)
2015−2016	Portimonense	12	(1)
2016	Leixões	1	(0)
2017	Quarteirense	0	(0)
Total		141	(20)
- * Club domestic league appearances and goals

André Francisco Bruno Ferreira (born 15 June 1990 in Santarém) is a Portuguese former professional footballer who played as a right winger.
