= Governor of Pernambuco =

Government office in Brazil

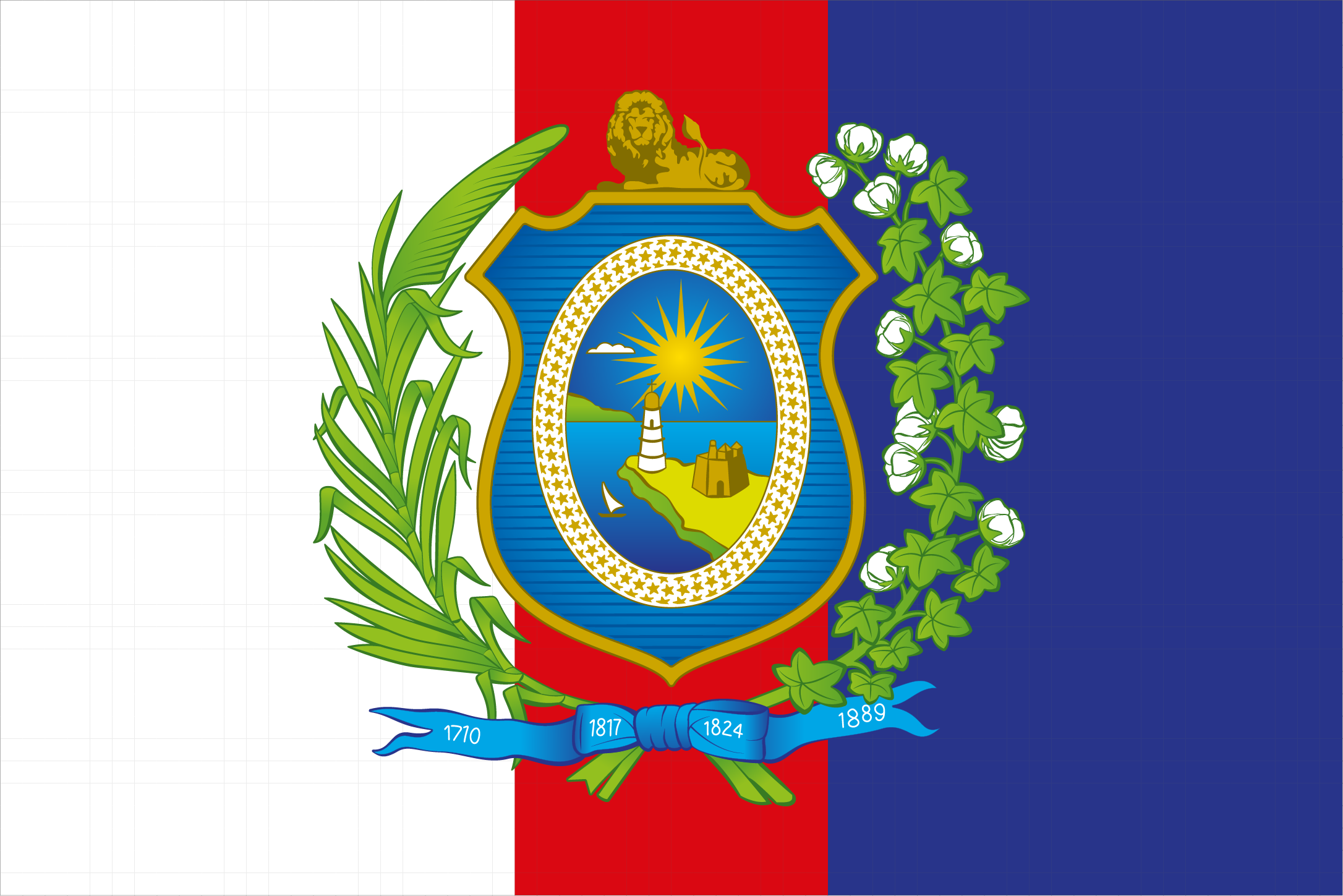
- Standard of the governor
- Incumbent; Raquel Lyra since 1 January 2023
- Style: Madam Governor or even simply Governor (informal); Most Excellent Madam Governor (formal); Her Excellency (alternative formal, diplomatic)
- Residence: Recife, Pernambuco
- Term length: Four years, renewable once consecutively
- Inaugural holder: José Cerqueira de Aguiar Lima
- Formation: 16 November 1889
- Deputy: Vice Governor of Pernambuco
- Website: www.pe.gov.br

The Governor of the State of Pernambuco is the chief executive of the state of Pernambuco. The governor is the head of the executive branch of Pernambuco's state government. The officeholder is afforded the courtesy title of His/Her Excellency while in office. The incumbent governor is Raquel Lyra, affiliated to the Brazilian Social Democracy Party (PSDB). Lyra won the 2022 Pernambuco gubernatorial election and was sworn in as the 58th governor of the state of Pernambuco on January 1, 2023.

== See also ==
- 2022 Pernambuco gubernatorial election
- Politics of Pernambuco
