= Humberto Costa =

Brazilian medical doctor and politician

Senator for Pernambuco
- Incumbent
- Assumed office February 1, 2011

Deputy from Pernambuco
- In office January 1, 1995 – January 1, 1999

Personal details
- Born: July 7, 1957 (age 69) Campinas, Brazil
- Party: Workers' Party
- Profession: Doctor
- Nickname: Dracula

Humberto Costa (born July 7, 1957) is a Brazilian medical doctor and politician. He has represented Pernambuco in the Federal Senate since 2011. Previously, he was a Deputy from Pernambuco from 1995 to 1999. He is a member of the Workers' Party.

== Corruption scandals ==
The Operation Vampire (Operação Vampiro) was an operation carried out in 2004 by the Federal Police of Brazil to investigate the diversion of resources that should have been intended for the purchase of materials and maintenance of public blood banks. 17 arrest warrants and 42 search and seizure orders were served. The investigation found that about R$2.3 billion (US$1 billion) was embezzled. Humberto Costa was the minister of health and personally nominated most of the officials who were arrested in the operation.

Humberto Costa was indicted for receiving R$590,000 (US$200,000) in bribes for favoring overbilling in a contract signed by Odebretch with Petrobras. The indictment took place within the scope of Operation Lava Jato.

The biggest implicated company, Odebrecht kept an entire department to coordinate the payment of bribe to politicians. In the Car Wash Operation, officers seized several electronic spreadsheets linking the payments to nicknames. Every corrupt politician received a nickname based on physical characteristics, public trajectory, personal infos, owned cars/boats, origin place or generic preferences. Humberto Costa's nickname was 'Dracula', referring the "Operation Vampire" when he allegedly embezzled funds from public blood banks.
