= Legislative Assembly of Pernambuco =

Government of Pernambuco, Brazil

Coordinates: 8°3′30″S 34°52′47″W

Legislative Assembly of Pernambuco Assembleia Legislativa de Pernambuco
- 20th legislature
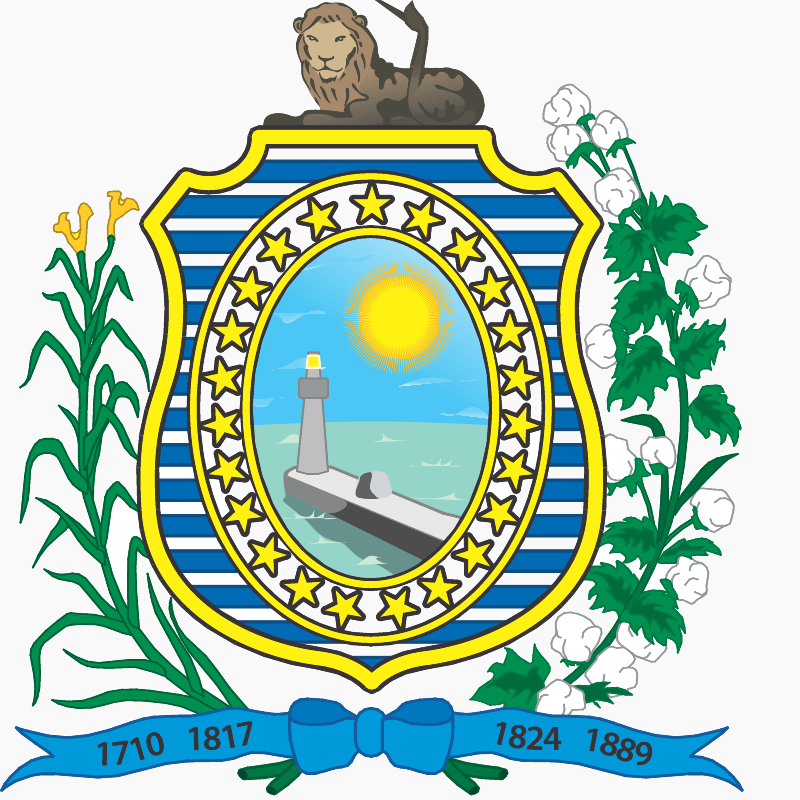

Type
- Type: Unicameral

Leadership
- President: Álvaro Porto, PSDB since 1 February 2023
- Government leader: Socorro Pimentel, UNIÃO

Structure
- Seats: 49 deputies
- Political groups: PSB (9) PP (8) FE Brasil (7) (Note: PCdoB (1) PV (3) PT (3)) PL (5) UNIÃO (5) PSDB (4) Solidarity (4) MDB (2) PRD (2) Republicans (2) PSOL (1)

Elections
- Voting system: Proportional representation
- Last election: 2 October 2022
- Next election: 2026

Meeting place
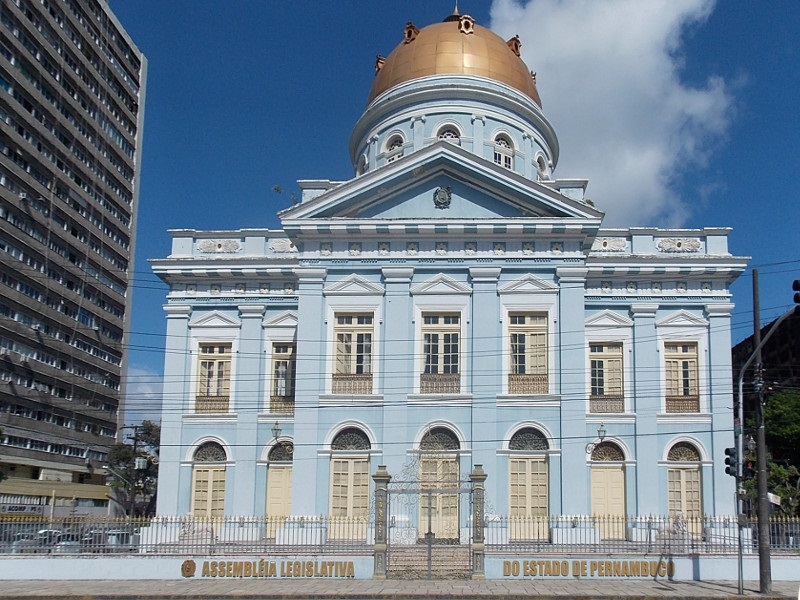
- Palácio Joaquim Nabuco, Recife

Website
- www.alepe.pe.gov.br

The Legislative Assembly of Pernambuco (Portuguese: Assembleia Legislativa de Pernambuco, Alepe) is the unicameral legislature of the state of Pernambuco, Brazil. It has 49 state deputies elected by proportional representation. The most recent election was in 2018, with the Brazilian Socialist Party leading the coalition government.

== History ==
On April 1, 1835 is installed the Legislative Assembly of the Province of Pernambuco, with the first legislature (1835-37 counted with 36 members, of whom 11 were priests, reflecting the strong influence of the Catholic Church at the time.

Its current headquarters was designed by architect José Tiburcio Pereira Magalhães, the inauguration took place on March 1, 1875, with the building still unfinished. The work was only finally delivered on January 20, 1876.

With the Proclamation of the Republic in 1889, is adopted in the states bicameral system with a Chamber of Deputies and State Senate. In Pernambuco, the Board was composed of 30 deputies, with a mandate of three years, and the Senate by 15 senators, with a mandate of six years.

In 1930, the Chambers of Deputies become Legislatures, interrupted the legislative work in 1937, with the imposition of the Estado Novo. In this period (until 1945), the state legislature is closed and replaced by appointed counsel.

With the return to democracy, a Constituent Assembly was elected in Pernambuco and after the enactment of the State Constitution, on July 25, 1947, that assembly passes the condition of the State Legislature.
