= Constitutional Amendment of Shielding =

Proposed amendment to the constitution of Brazil

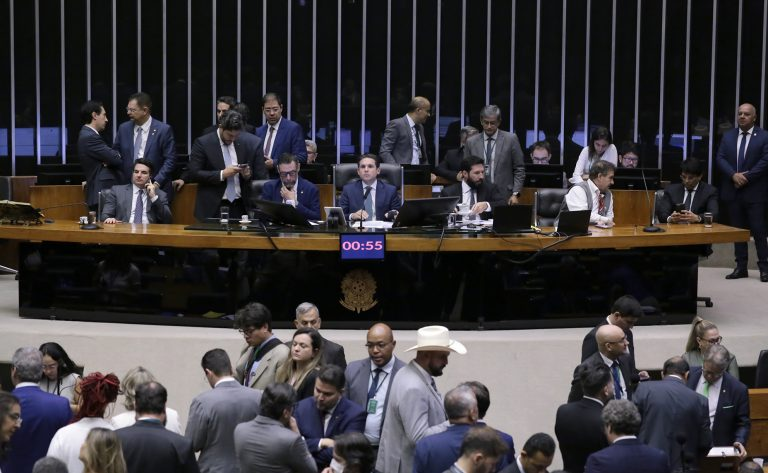
- Plenary of the Chamber of Deputies during the constitutional amendment voting.

Brazilian National Congress
- Long title: Amends articles 14, 27, 53, 102 and 105 of the Federal Constitution, to provide for parliamentary prerogatives and other measures.
- Territorial extent: Brazil
- Passed by: Chamber of Deputies
- Passed: 17 September 2025
- Considered by: Federal Senate

Legislative history

Initiating chamber: Chamber of Deputies
- Bill title: Constitutional Amendment Bill no. 3 of 2021
- Bill citation: PEC 3/2021
- Introduced by: Dep. Celso Sabino (PSDB-PA)
- Introduced: 24 February 2021
- Second reading: 16 September 2025
- Passed: 16 September 2025
- Voting summary: 344 voted for; 133 voted against; 36 absent

Revising chamber: Federal Senate
- Bill title: Constitutional Amendment Bill no. 3 of 2021
- Bill citation: PEC 3/2021
- Received from the Chamber of Deputies: 17 September 2025
- Committee responsible: Constitution, Justice and Citizenship
- Considered by the Constitution, Justice and Citizenship Committee: 24 September 2025 (rejected, None voted for, 26 voted against)
- Status: Rejected in committee by the Federal Senate

Constitutional Amendment Bill no. 3/2021 (popularly known as Constitutional Amendment of Shielding, Constitutional Amendment of Immunity or Constitutional Amendment of Banditry; Constitutional Amendment of Prerogatives for supporters) was a Brazilian constitutional amendment which consists of the need for prior authorization, in a secret voting, of the Chamber or Senate for the Supreme Federal Court to prosecute a parliamentarian, whether a deputy or a senator. Introduced by opposition parties, right-wing and centrão, under justification of being a response against "abuses" and allegations of persecution by the Supreme Court, this constitutional amendment expands the protection of parliamentarians against investigations, criminal and civil lawsuits (even if they have committed serious crimes, such as manslaughter, robbery, pedophilia and domestic violence) and could benefit and shield many lawmakers who are currently investigated by the Supreme Federal Court for parliamentary amends embezzlement and acting against Brazilian sovereignty. Centre-right and right-wing parties, such as the Liberal Party, Progressistas, Brazil Union and Republicans, showed massive support to this bill. This proposal would also institute, if passed, privilegium fori for presidents of political parties. Another major risk would be members of organized crime, such as the Primeiro Comando da Capital (PCC) or Comando Vermelho (CV), entering politics with the goal of shielding themselves from investigations. Recent cases, such as state deputy TH Joias (MDB-RJ), investigate for association with drug trafficking, and federal deputy Elmar Nascimento (UNIÃO-BA), investigated for embezzlement, could not happen without the authorization of their peers.

Many sectors of social society and artists showed their opposition to the constitutional amendment, with many protests occurred in many Brazilian cities, with São Paulo reaching the peak of participants. In face of the bad repercussion, many deputies apologized for voting in favor of the bill.

== History ==
=== Introduction ===
The bill was introduced by federal deputy Celso Sabino from the state of Pará, at the time a member of the Brazilian Social Democracy Party. The first reading occurred on 24 February 2021.

=== Chamber votings ===
On 16 September 2025, president Hugo Motta (Republicanos-PB) tabled the bill after a meeting with leaders of political parties.

=== Report ===
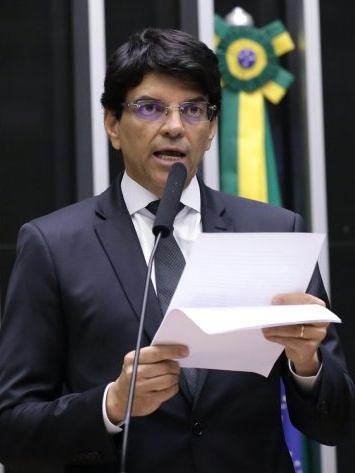
Deputy Cláudio Cajado (PP-BA), report of the bill designated by Hugo Motta

Deputy Lafayette Andrada (Republicanos-MG) was the first rapporteur designated in August 2025, after the riot of opposition lawmakers against the director's boards of both congressional Houses. The obstruction aimed to press the presidencies to table Prerogatives Bill and the amnesty proposal for arrested protestors from the 8 January Brasília attacks. The unblocking of both boards came after a deal made by former Chamber president Arthur Lira, an ally of president Hugo Motta. On the day the bill was tabled, Motta changed the rapporteur, designating deputy Cláudio Cajado (PP-BA), an ally of Lira.

==== Plenary ====
Voted in two ballots, the bill was passed in the first ballot in a voting of 353–134 and the second ballot in a voting of 344–133.

Vote to pass the amendment bill
First ballot	16 September 2025
Required majority	308 out of 513 (60%)
Yes	353 / 513
No	134 / 513
Abstentions	1 / 513
Absentees	25 / 513

Vote to pass the amendment bill
Second ballot	16 September 2025
Required majority	308 out of 513 (60%)
Yes	344 / 513
No	133 / 513
Abstentions	0 / 513
Absentees	36 / 513

==== Agglutinative amendment ====
After the voting, on the following day, leaders of political parties presented to the rapporteur a new amendment that consisted in a new version of the previous approved bill, adding the need of a secret ballot to authorize legal proceedings by the Supreme Court against Congress members.

Vote to pass the agglunative amendment bill
Second ballot	17 September 2025
Required majority	308 out of 513 (60%)
Yes	314 / 513
No	168 / 513
Abstentions	0 / 513
Absentees	31 / 513

Party	Votes	%	Seats	
Party	Votes	%	For	Against
Liberal Party	85	17.63	85	0
Workers' Party	65	13.49	8	57
Brazil Union	53	11.00	43	10
Progressistas	48	9.96	46	2
Republicans	44	9.13	43	1
Social Democratic Party	39	8.09	18	21
Brazilian Democratic Movement	34	7.05	27	7
Podemos	17	3.53	14	3
Brazilian Socialist Party	16	3.32	3	13
Democratic Labour Party	15	3.11	4	11
Socialism and Liberty Party	14	2.90	0	14
Brazilian Social Democracy Party	13	2.70	7	6
Communist Party of Brazil	9	1.87	0	9
Avante	7	1.45	6	1
Solidariedade	5	1.04	4	1
Democratic Renewal Party	5	1.04	4	1
New Party	4	0.83	0	4
Green Party	4	0.83	0	4
Cidadania	4	0.83	2	2
Sustainability Network	1	0.21	0	1
Total	482	100.00	314	168
Registered voters/turnout	513	–		

==== Votes cast by members ====
All Chamber members of the 57th Legislature that voted against party lines are noted here.

Member	Party	State	First ballot	Second ballot	Amendment
Alex Santana	Republicanos	Bahia	No	No	Yes
Aliel Machado	PV	Paraná	Yes	Yes	No
André Figueiredo	PDT	Ceará	Yes	Yes	No
Any Ortiz	Cidadania	Rio Grande do Sul	Yes	Yes	No
Augusto Rosa	PL	São Paulo	No	No	Yes
Bacelar	PV	Bahia	Yes	Yes	No
Dagoberto Nogueira	PSDB	Mato Grosso do Sul	No	No	Yes
Danilo Forte	UNIÃO	Ceará	Yes	Yes	No
Danrlei Hinterholz	PSD	Rio Grande do Sul	Yes	Yes	No
David Soares	UNIÃO	São Paulo	Yes	Yes	No
Duda Ramos	MDB	Roraima	Yes	Yes	No
Emidinho Madeira	PL	Minas Gerais	No	No	Yes
Eriberto Medeiros	PSB	Pernambuco	Yes	Yes	No
Fábio Teruel	MDB	São Paulo	Yes	Yes	No
Fernando Máximo	UNIÃO	Rondônia	Yes	Yes	No
Flávio Nogueira	PT	Piauí	Yes	Yes	No
Florentino Neto	PT	Piauí	Yes	Yes	No
Francisco Costa	PT	Piauí	Yes	Yes	No
Gervásio Maia	PSB	Paraíba	Yes	Yes	No
Gilson Daniel	PODE	Espírito Santo	No	No	Yes
Gilson Fahur	PSD	Paraná	Yes	Yes	No
Henderson Pinto	MDB	Pará	Yes	Yes	No
Ismael dos Santos	PSD	Santa Catarina	Yes	Yes	No
João Bacelar	PL	Bahia	No	No	Yes
João Daniel	PT	Sergipe	No	No	Yes
Jonas Donizette	PSB	São Paulo	Yes	Yes	No
Jonildo Assis	UNIÃO	Mato Grosso	Yes	Yes	No
Júlio Cesar Lima	PSD	Piauí	Yes	Yes	No
Julio Cesar Ribeiro	Republicanos	Federal District	Yes	Yes	No
Luciano Bivar	UNIÃO	Pernambuco	Yes	Yes	absent
Lucio Mosquini	MDB	Rondônia	No	No	Yes
Luiz Fernando Faria	PSD	Minas Gerais	Yes	Yes	No
Luiz Philippe of Orléans-Braganza	PL	São Paulo	No	No	Yes
Márcio Honaiser	PDT	Maranhão	Yes	Yes	No
Marcos Aurélio Sampaio	PSD	Piauí	Yes	Yes	No
Marcos Soares	UNIÃO	Rio de Janeiro	Yes	Yes	No
Marcos Tavares	PDT	Rio de Janeiro	Yes	Yes	No
Mauro Benevides Filho	PDT	Ceará	Yes	Yes	No
Meire Serafim	UNIÃO	Acre	Yes	Yes	No
Mendonça Filho	UNIÃO	Pernambuco	Yes	Yes	No
Merlong Solano	PT	Piauí	Yes	Yes	No
Mersinho Lucena	PP	Paraíba	No	No	Yes
Miguel Lombardi	PL	São Paulo	Yes	Yes	No
Pauderney Avelino	UNIÃO	Amazonas	Yes	Yes	No
Paulo Folletto	PSB	Espírito Santo	Yes	Yes	No
Pedro Aihara	PRD	Minas Gerais	Yes	Yes	No
Pedro Campos	PSB	Pernambuco	Yes	Yes	No
Rafael Fera	PODE	Rondônia	Yes	Yes	No
Renilce Nicodemos	MDB	Pará	Yes	Yes	No
Ricardo Maia	MDB	Bahia	Yes	Yes	No
Robério Monteiro	PDT	Ceará	Yes	Yes	No
Roberto Duarte	Republicanos	Acre	Yes	Yes	No
Rodrigo Estacho	PSD	Paraná	Yes	Yes	No
Stefano Aguiar	PSD	Minas Gerais	No	No	Yes
Thiago Flores	Republicanos	Rondônia	No	No	Yes
Valmir Assunção	PT	Bahia	No	No	Yes
Weliton Prado	Solidarity	Minas Gerais	No	No	Yes
Zé Silva	Solidarity	Minas Gerais	No	No	Yes

== Aftermath ==
=== Protests ===
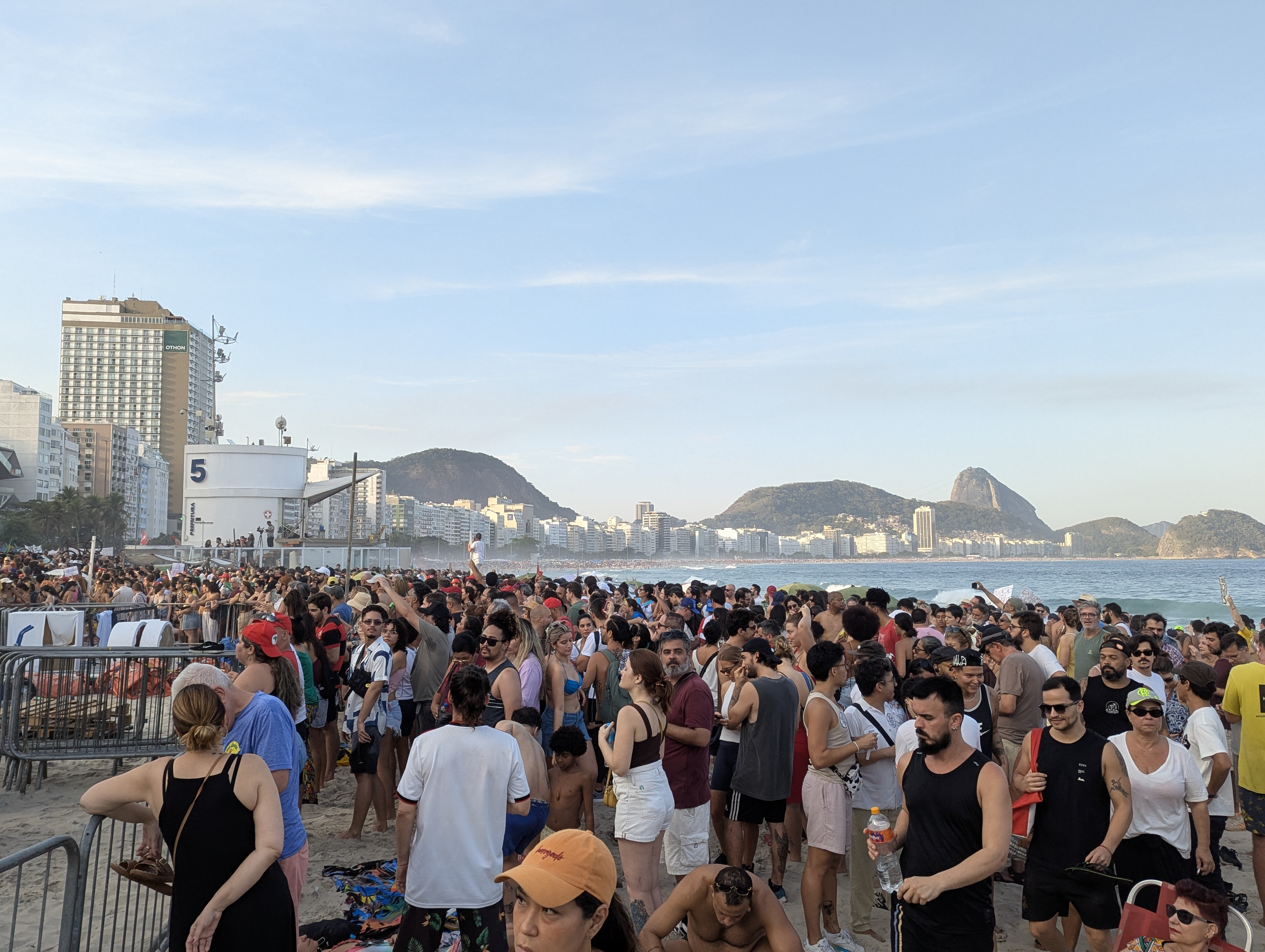
Protest against amnesty and the Shielding Bill in Copacabana, Rio de Janeiro.

On 21 September 2025, protests against the bill approved and against the amnesty proposal for those convicted for the 8 January attacks erupted in many cities. In Copacabana, Rio de Janeiro, a protest organized by producer Paula Lavigne, gathered names such as Gilberto Gil, Caetano Veloso, Chico Buarque, Paulinho da Viola, Djavan, Frejat, Ivan Lins, Geraldo Azevedo and Maria Gadú in a concert against the amendment bill and the amnesty. According to an estimate by the Political Debate Monitor of the Brazilian Center of Analysis and Planning (CEBRAP), in partnership with NGO More in Common, it was estimated a total of 41,800 people, with an error margin between 36,800 and 46,800 people.

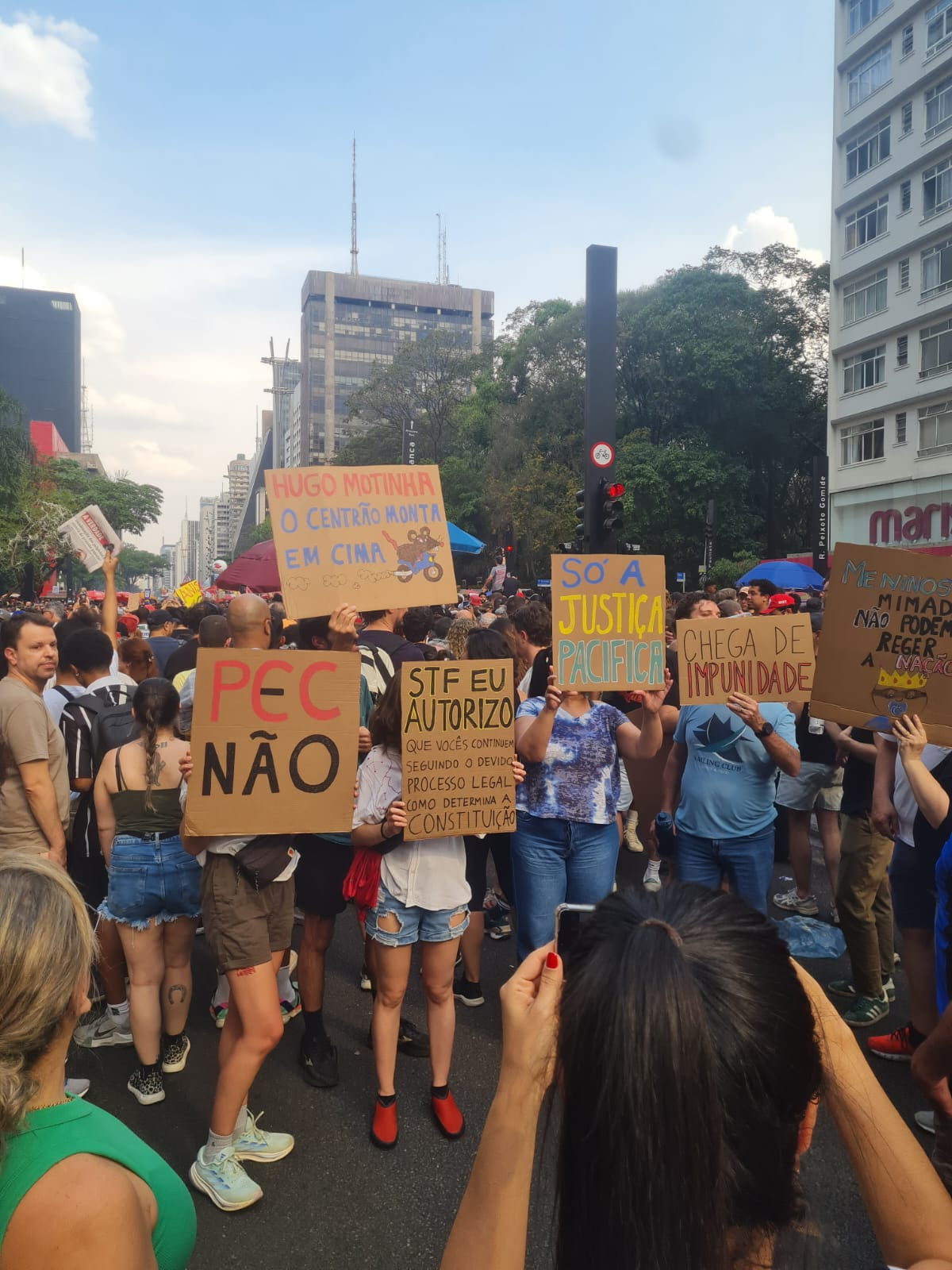
Protest on Paulista Avenue, São Paulo.

In São Paulo, the protest occurred on Paulista Avenue, with the participation of artists such as Emicida, Luiz Thunderbird, João Suplicy, Otto and Leoni, and many social movements and trade unions. According to a CEBRAP estimate, around 42,400 people were present in the protests, at 16h06, considered a peak time of the protest, with an error margin between 37,300 and 47,500 people. The capital of Minas Gerais, Belo Horizonte, registered popular gathering on Praça Raul Soares and headed towards Praça da Estação, with the presence of trade unions and local artists. In Brasília, the protests took place at the Monumental Axis, with presence of artists such as Chico César and Djonga. In Belém, which will host the 2025 United Nations Climate Change Conference (COP30), the protest took place in front of Theatro da Paz, on Praça da República, by the morning. Actor Marco Nanini and artists of the city endorsed the protest.

In Curitiba, around 15,000 people were present at the protests on Boca Maldita, traditional gathering place for protests in the city. In Florianópolis, the protest scheduled by trade unions and left-wing parties gathered 5,000 people. Porto Alegre gathered more than 15,000 people, with the protest ending on Largo Zumbi dos Palmares.

=== Senate voting ===
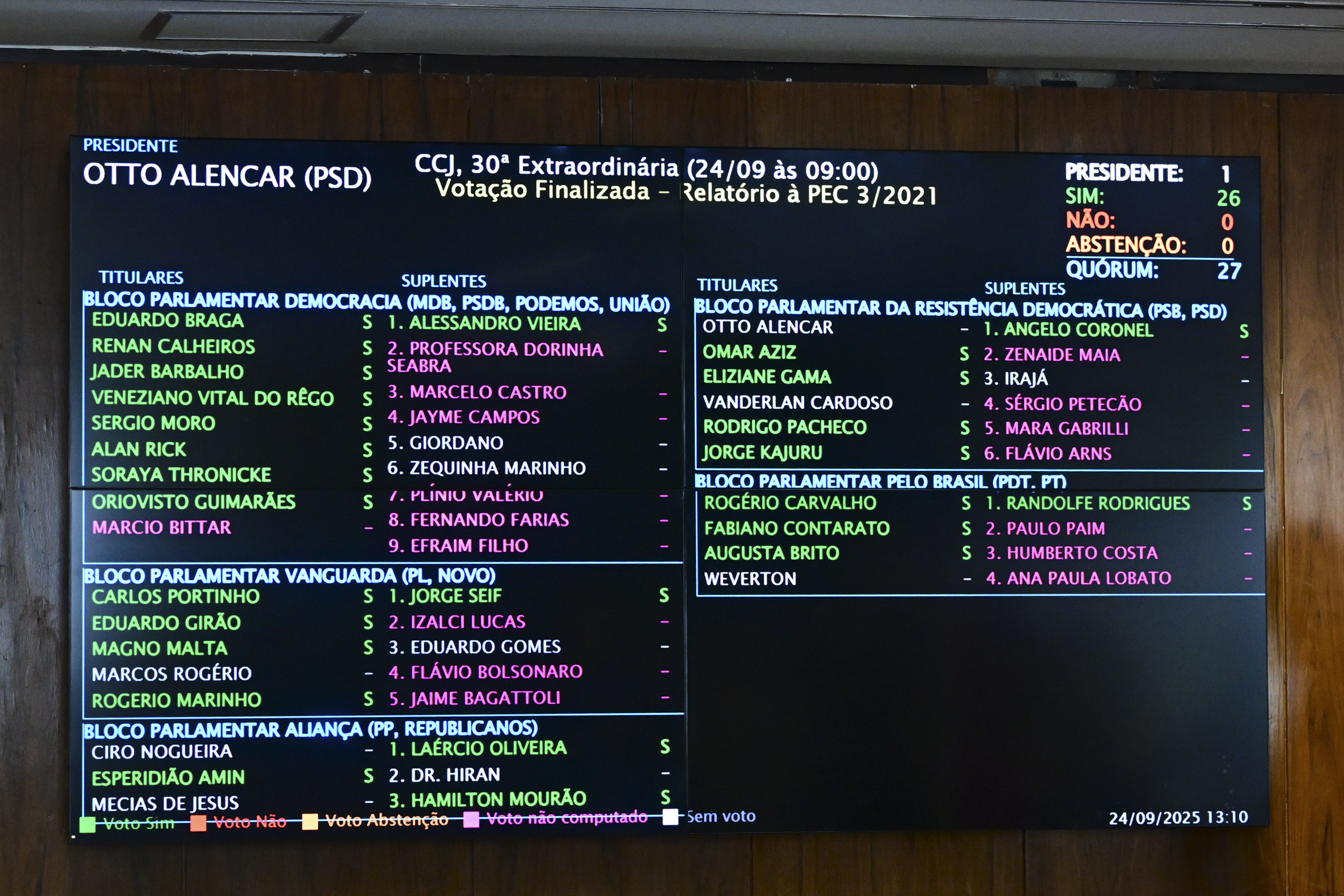
Electronic voting panel of the commission showing the unanimous result.

On 24 September 2025, three days after the protests, the Federal Senate Constitution, Justice and Citizenship Commission unanimously rejected the bill. It was expected that the bill would be sent to the Senate floor, and eventually rejected, but Senate president Davi Alcolumbre (UNIÃO-AP) stated that, according to the internal statute, as the commission determined the bill's unconstitutionality, the bill would not even need to be voted on, and thus, archived it on the same day.

Vote to reject the amendment bill
Ballot	24 September 2025
Required majority	14 out of 27 (51%)
Yes	26 / 27
No	0 / 27
Abstentions	0 / 27
Not voting	1 / 27

The 26 senators members and surrogates of the commission are the following:

- Alan Rick (UNIÃO-AC)
- Alessandro Vieira (MDB-SE)
- Angelo Coronel (PSD-BA)
- Augusta Brito (PT-CE)
- Carlos Portinho (PL-RJ)
- Eduardo Braga (MDB-AM)
- Eduardo Girão (NOVO-CE)
- Eliziane Gama (PSD-MA)
- Esperidião Amin (PP-SC)
- Fabiano Contarato (PT-ES)
- Hamilton Mourão (Republicanos-RS)
- Jader Barbalho (MDB-PA)
- Jorge Kajuru (PSB-GO)
- Jorge Seif (PL-SC)
- Laercio Oliveira (PP-SE)
- Magno Malta (PL-ES)
- Omar Aziz (PSD-AM)
- Oriovisto Guimarães (PSDB-PR)
- Randolfe Rodrigues (PT-AP)
- Renan Calheiros (MDB-AL)
- Rodrigo Pacheco (PSD-MG)
- Rogério Carvalho (PT-SE)
- Rogério Marinho (PL-RN)
- Sergio Moro (UNIÃO-PR)
- Soraya Thronicke (PODE-MS)
- Veneziano Vital do Rêgo (MDB-PB)
