= 8 January CPMI =

2023 parliamentary inquiry commission in Brazil

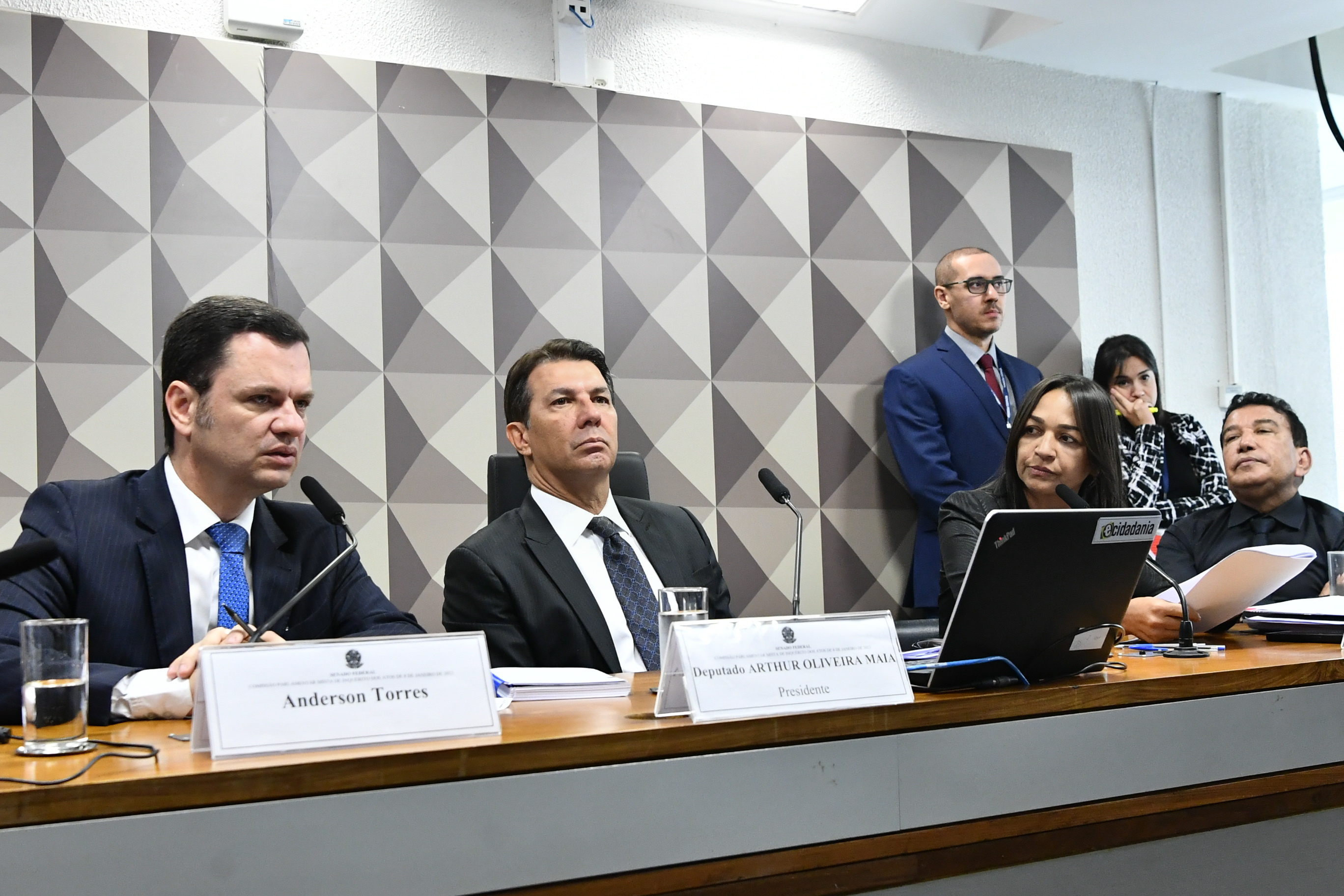
- Former justice minister Anderson Torres during hearing beside CPI chair Arthur Maia and rapporteur Eliziane Gama
- Native name: CPMI do 8 de janeiro
- Date: 26 April 2023 – 18 October 2023
- Time: (UTC–3)
- Duration: 5 months and 22 days
- Venue: National Congress of Brazil
- Location: Brasília, Federal District
- Also known as: Coup CPMI; Antidemocratic Acts CPMI
- Type: Parliamentary Commission of Inquiry
- Cause: 2023 Brazilian Congress attack
- Participants: Members

The 8 January CPMI (Note: Also called Antidemocratic Acts CPMI or Coup CPMI) was a parliamentary inquiry commission in Brazil that investigated the invasion and attack of the Praça dos Três Poderes against the National Congress of Brazil on 8 January 2023.

== Background ==
After acts of vandalism by supporters of former president Jair Bolsonaro against the Supreme Federal Court building, the National Congress Palace and the Planalto Palace, many disclaimer notes and solidarity notes supporting Lula's government and the defense of democracy in Brazil was published by the country's federative units and foreign countries.

The CPI was first suggested by Bolsonaro supporters, who endorsed the theory that the federal government infiltrated people among the protesters to allow the invasion and pose as a victim. Senator Soraya Thronicke (UNIÃO-MS) was the CPI rapporteur on the Senate and she could gather enough signatures, but Congress president Rodrigo Pacheco (PSD-MG) hadn't form it. Until then, the government coalition had a position against the creation of the commission for considering that the investigations were ongoing by the Judiciary Power and the legislative branch of the Federal District. Later, CNN Brazil published CCTV video, which was classified at the time, showing members of the Institutional Security Bureau ignoring the presence of the vandals, leading to the removal of Gonçalves Dias, head of the department appointed by Lula. Therefore, the creation of the CPI became inevitable to oppose the infiltration theory. Representative André Fernandes (PL-CE) filed a new CPI request and the opposition obstructed all of the voting until the reading of the request.

== Members ==
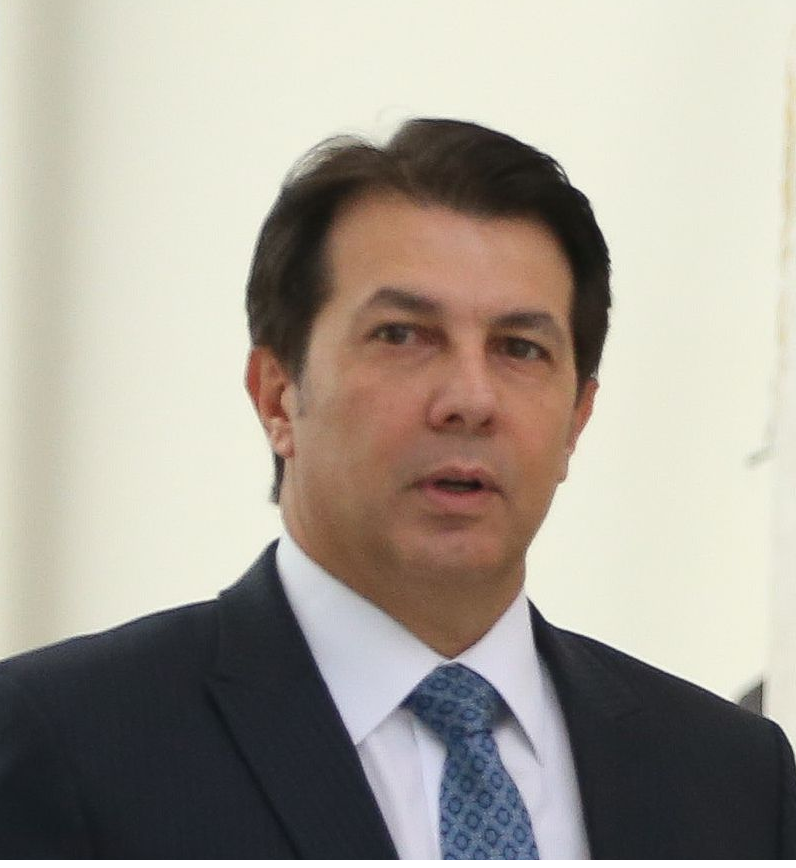
Chair Arthur Maia (UNIÃO-BA)

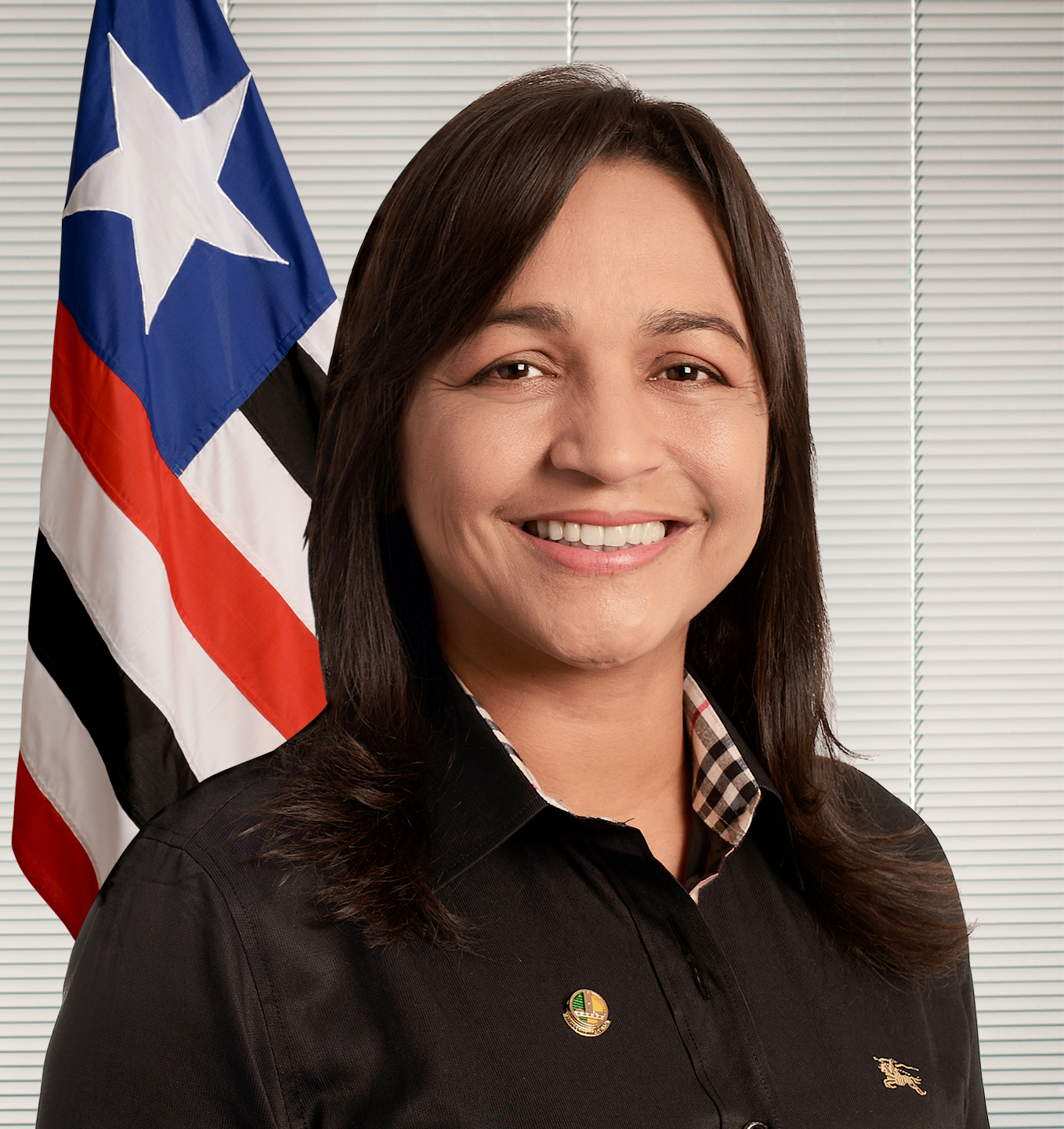
Rapporteur Eliziane Gama (PSD-MA)

=== Director's Board ===
- Chair: Rep. Arthur Oliveira Maia (UNIÃO-BA)
- 1st Vice Chair: Sen. Cid Gomes (PDT-CE)
- 2nd Vice Chair: Sen. Magno Malta (PL-ES)
- Rapporteur: Sen. Eliziane Gama (PSD-MA)

=== Federal Senate ===
==== Democracy Parliamentary Bloc (MDB/UNIÃO/PODE/PSDB/PDT) ====
Permanent

- Cid Gomes (PDT-CE)
- Davi Alcolumbre (UNIÃO-AP)
- Marcelo Castro (MDB-PI)
- Marcos do Val (PODE-ES)
- Soraya Thronicke (PODE-MS)
- Veneziano Vital do Rêgo (MDB-PB)

Substitutes

- Alexandre Giordano (MDB-SP)
- Dorinha Seabra (UNIÃO-TO)
- Fernando Dueire (MDB-AL)
- Izalci Lucas (PSDB-DF)
- Sergio Moro (UNIÃO-PR)
- Styvenson Valentim (PODE-RN)

==== Democratic Resistance Parliamentary Bloc (PSD/PT/PSB) ====
Permanent

- Ana Paula Lobato (PSB-MA)
- Eliziane Gama (PSD-MA)
- Fabiano Contarato (PT-ES)
- Omar Aziz (PSD-AM)
- Otto Alencar (PSD-BA)
- Rogério Carvalho (PT-SE)

Substitutes

- Angelo Coronel (PSD-BA)
- Augusta Brito (PT-CE)
- Irajá Abreu (PSD-TO)
- Jorge Kajuru (PSB-GO)
- Randolfe Rodrigues (Ind-AP)
- Zenaide Maia (PSD-RN)

==== Vanguard Parliamentary Bloc (PL/NOVO) ====
Permanent

- Eduardo Girão (NOVO-CE)
- Magno Malta (PL-ES)

Substitutes

- Flávio Bolsonaro (PL-RJ)
- Jorge Seif (PL-SC)

==== Alliance Parliamentary Bloc (PP/Republicanos) ====
Permanent

- Damares Alves (Republicanos-DF)
- Esperidião Amin (PP-SC)

Substitutes

- Cleitinho Azevedo (Republicanos-MG)
- Luiz Carlos Heinze (PP-RS)

=== Chamber of Deputies ===
==== UNIÃO/PP/PSDB Cidadania Federation/PDT/PSB/Avante/Solidariedade/Patriota Bloc ====
Permanent

- Arthur Oliveira Maia (UNIÃO-BA)
- Amanda Gentil (PP-MA)
- Carlos Sampaio (PSDB-SP)
- Duda Salabert (PDT-MG)
- Duarte Júnior (PSB-MA)

Substitutes

- Any Ortiz (Cidadania-RS)
- Evair de Melo (PP-ES)
- Felipe Francischini (UNIÃO-PR)
- Gervásio Maia (PSB-PB)
- Josenildo Abrantes (PDT-AP)

==== MDB/PSD/Republicanos/PODE/PSC Bloc ====
Permanent

- Aluísio Mendes (Republicanos-MA)
- Paulo Magalhães (PSD-BA)
- Rafael Brito (MDB-AL)
- Rodrigo Gambale (PODE-SP)

Substitutes

- Emanuel Pinheiro Neto (MDB-MT)
- Laura Carneiro (PSD-RJ)
- Mauricio Marcon (PODE-RS)
- Roberto Duarte (Republicanos-AC)

==== Liberal Party ====
Permanent

- Alexandre Ramagem (PL-RJ)
- André Fernandes (PL-CE)
- Filipe Barros (PL-PR)

Substitutes

- Eduardo Bolsonaro (PL-SP)
- Marco Feliciano (PL-SP)
- Nikolas Ferreira (PL-MG)

==== Brazil of Hope Federation ====
Permanent

- Jandira Feghali (PCdoB-RJ)
- Rogério Correia (PT-MG)
- Rubens Pereira Júnior (PT-MA)

Substitutes

- Adriana Accorsi (PT-GO)
- Aliel Machado (PV-PR)
- Carlos Veras (PT-PE)

==== PSOL REDE Federation ====
Permanent

- Erika Hilton (PSOL-SP)

Substitute

- Henrique Vieira (PSOL-RJ)

== Hearings and meetings ==
=== First Week ===
On the first week of the CPMI, there was resistance to the nomination of Eliziane Gama as rapporteur by the opposition, for considering her a "partial" congresswoman during hearings. However, the position was countered by government lawmakers. Other decision contested was the position of a 2nd Vice Chair, with the nomination of senator Esperidião Amin. However, according to the internal statute of both houses, such an act would be a violation of Article 20 of the National Congress. However, according to Congressman Rubens Pereira, Article 21 of the same regiment did not forbid it in mixed parliamentary inquiry commissions. During the session, the opposition tried to unbind themselves from the 8 January attacks. Congressman Marco Felicia denied that the vandals had promoted a coup d'état. Congressman Eduardo Bolsonaro affirmed that "there were infiltrated people" among the protesters, citing also supposed "violations of human rights and arbitrary arrests".

== See also ==
- COVID-19 CPI
