= Abrantes (surname) =

Abrantes is a Portuguese surname. Notable people with the surname include:

- Alfredo Abrantes (1929–2005), Portuguese footballer
- António Abrantes (born 1968), Portuguese middle-distance runner
- António Abrantes Mendes (1907–1987), Portuguese footballer
- Arnaldo Abrantes (born 1986), Portuguese sprinter
- Arnaldo Abrantes (athlete, born 1961), Portuguese sprinter
- Domingos Abrantes (born 1936), Portuguese politician
- Fernando Abrantes (born 1960), German-Portuguese musician
- Josenildo Abrantes (born 1973), Brazilian politician
- Mara Abrantes (1934–2021), Brazilian-Portuguese singer
- Rodolfo Abrantes (born 1972), Brazilian singer and musician
- Roger Abrantes (born 1951), Portuguese writer
