= Alex Santana (disambiguation) =

Alex Santana (born 1995) is a Brazilian footballer.

Alex Santana may also refer to:

- Alex Muralha (born 1989), full name Alex Roberto Santana Rafael, Brazilian footballer
- Alex Santana (baseball), American baseball player
- Alex Santana (politician) (born 1972), Brazilian politician

== See also ==
- Alexi Santana, alias used by imposter James Hogue
