= Rodrigo Estacho =

Brazilian politician (born 1989)

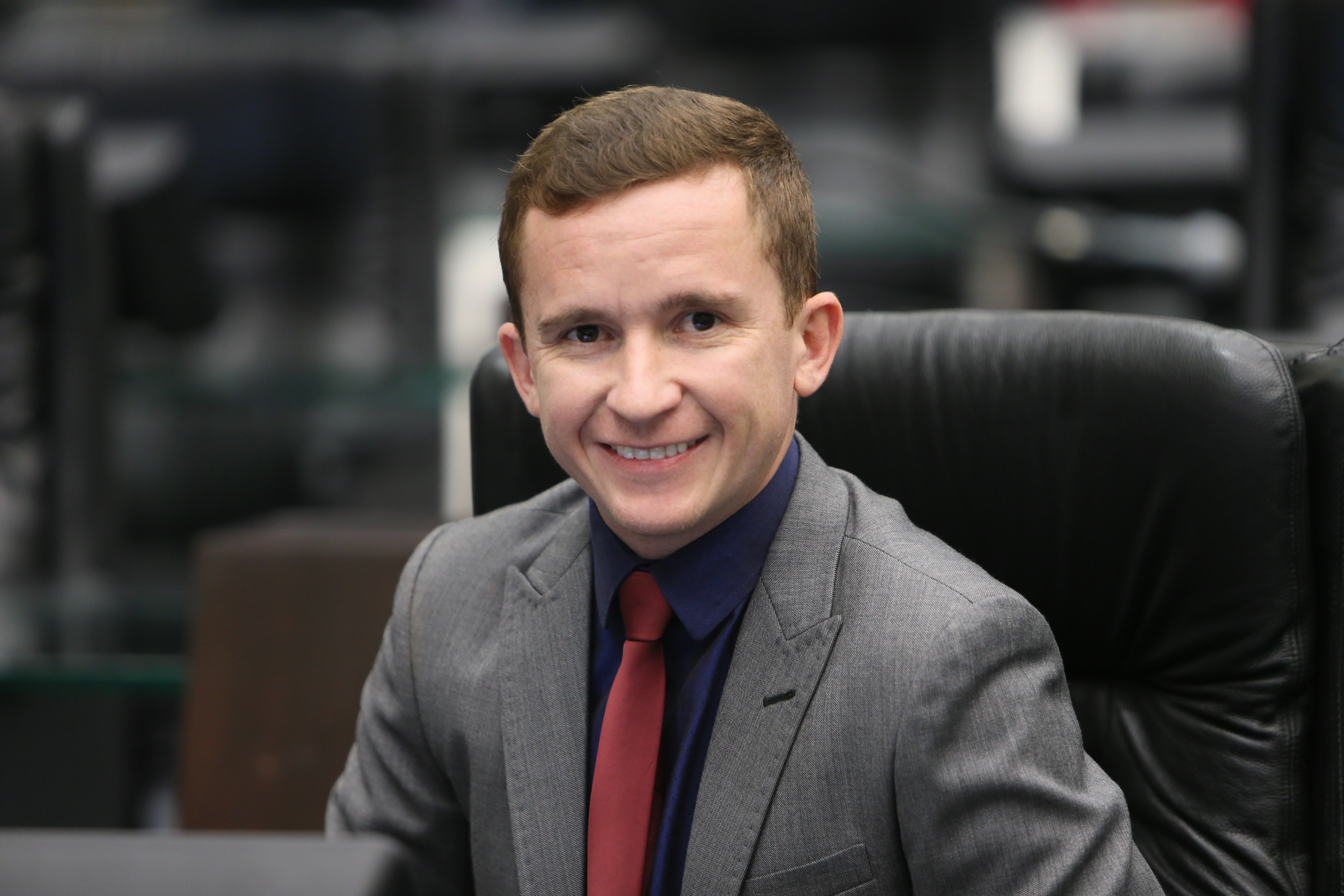
- Estacho in 2019

Member of the Chamber of Deputies
- Incumbent
- Assumed office 15 February 2023
- Preceded by: Leandre Dal Ponte
- Constituency: Paraná

Personal details
- Born: 16 January 1989 (age 37)
- Party: Social Democratic Party (since 2022)

Rodrigo Tlustik Venek (born 16 January 1989), better known as Rodrigo Estacho, is a Brazilian politician serving as a member of the Chamber of Deputies since 2023. From 2019 to 2023, he was a member of the Legislative Assembly of Paraná.
