= Robério Monteiro =

Brazilian politician (born 1970)

- Official portrait, 2019

Member of the Chamber of Deputies
- Incumbent
- Assumed office 1 February 2019
- Constituency: Ceará

Member of the Legislative Assembly of Ceará
- In office 1 February 2015 – 1 February 2019
- Constituency: At-large

Mayor of Itarema
- In office 1 January 2005 – 1 January 2013
- Vice Mayor: Roberto Gomes (2005–2008); Pio Rios (2009–2012)
- Preceded by: José Stênio Rios
- Succeeded by: Benedito Filho

Personal details
- Born: Marcos Robério Ribeiro Monteiro; 15 February 1970 (age 56) Itarema, Ceará, Brazil
- Party: PSB (2026–present)
- Other political affiliations: PMDB (1992–2013); PROS (2013–2016); PDT (2016–2026)

Marcos Robério Ribeiro Monteiro (born 15 February 1970) is a Brazilian politician serving as a member of the Chamber of Deputies since 2019. From 2015 to 2018, he was a member of the Legislative Assembly of Ceará. From 2005 to 2012, he served as mayor of Itarema.

Political offices
Preceded by José Stênio Rios	Mayor of Itarema; 2005–2013	Succeeded by Benedito dos Santos Filho
