= Capitólio rockfall =

Natural disaster in Minas Gerais, Brazil, in 2022

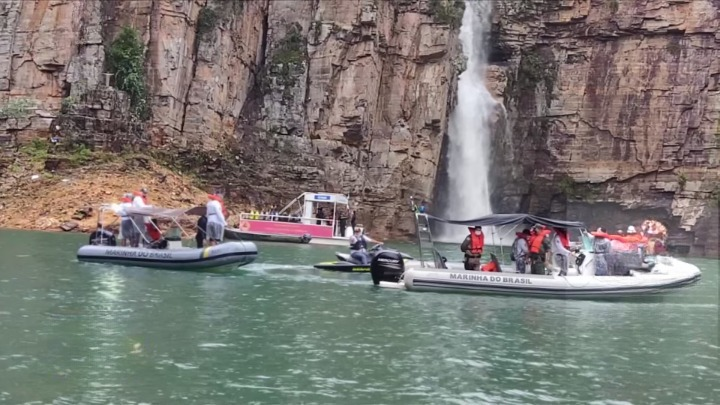
- Search-and-rescue efforts after the rockfall
- Date: 8 January 2022
- Time: c. 12:30 BRT (UTC−03)
- Location: Capitólio, Minas Gerais, Brazil; 20°38′49″S 46°15′56″W
- Deaths: 10
- Injuries: 32

On 8 January 2022, a rockfall occurred in a canyon of Furnas Lake in Capitólio, Minas Gerais, Brazil. A cliff face collapsed onto tourist pleasure boats on the lake, killing 10 people and leaving 32 others injured.

== Background ==
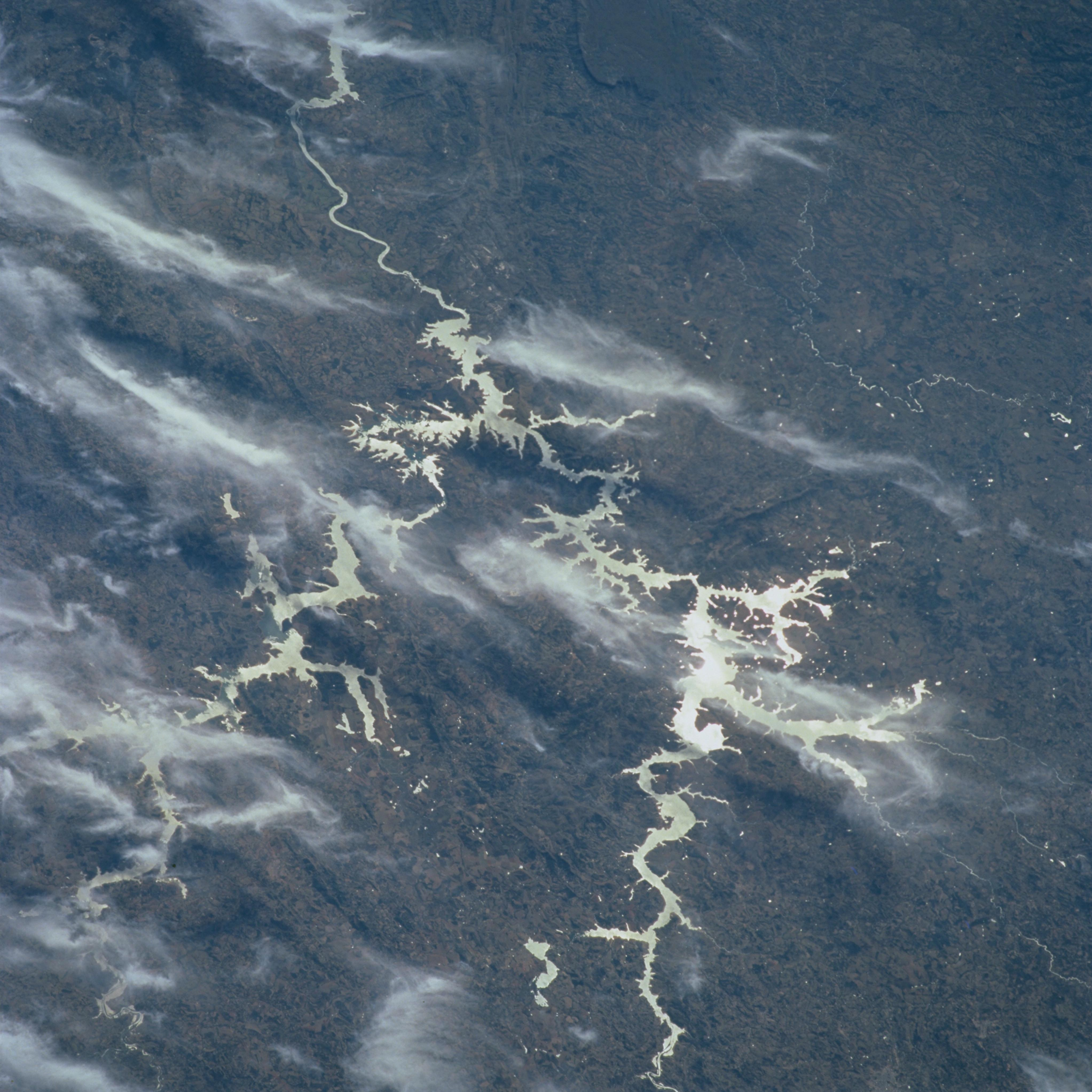
Furnas Reservoir seen from the International Space Station

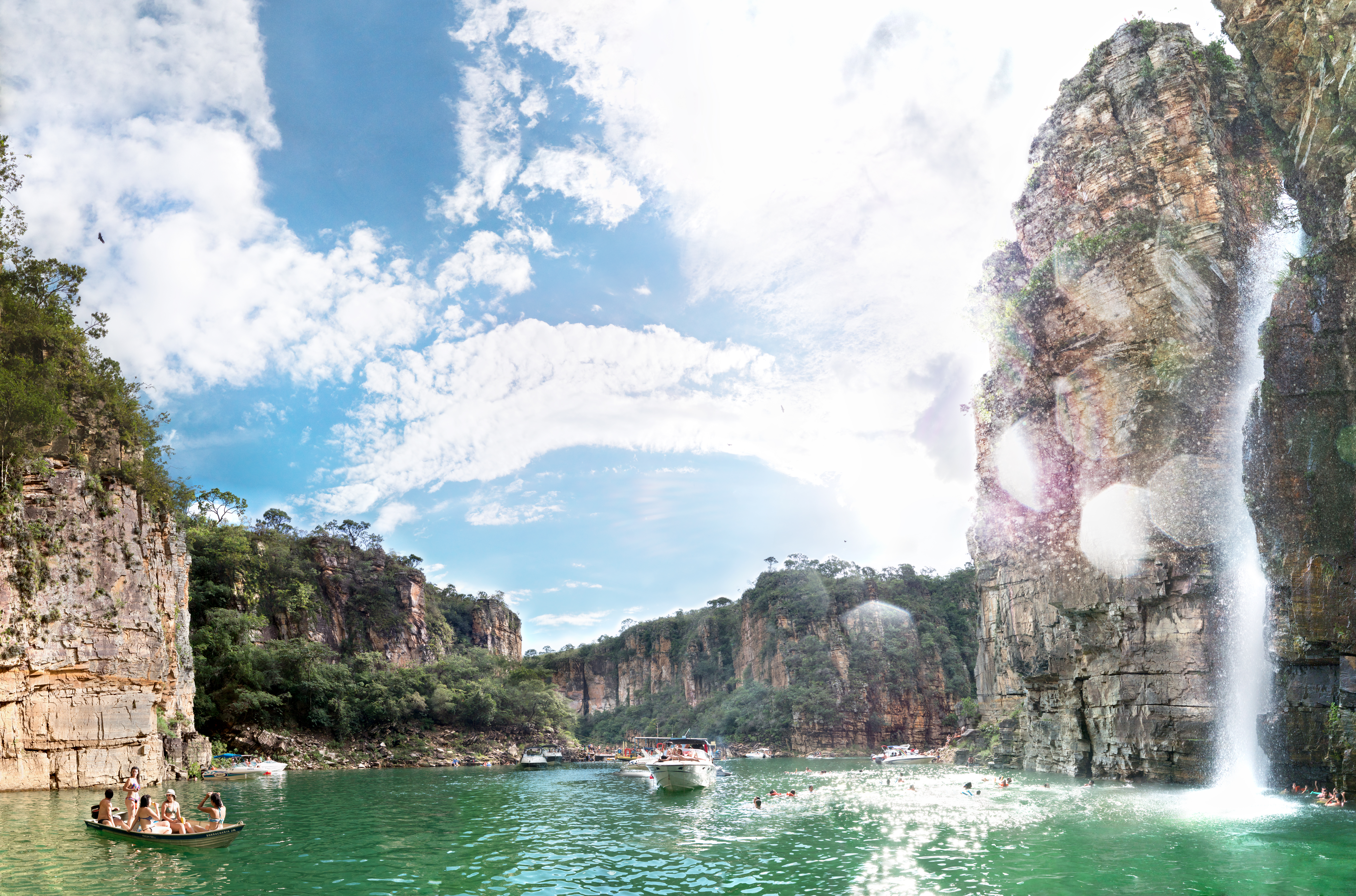
Cliffs along Furnas Lake with speedboats and bathers

Furnas Lake, a reservoir created by Furnas Dam in the Brazilian state of Minas Gerais, attracts tourists looking for speedboat rides and diving in the region. The canyons at the site are formed by walls more than twenty metres (66 ft) tall. In an interview with GloboNews, Lieutenant Pedro Aihara, a spokesman for the Fire Department of Minas Gerais, explained that the formation of the site is of sedimentary rocks and, therefore, more susceptible to the action of wind and rain. At the end of the morning of 8 January 2022, the same day as the accident, the Civil Defense of Minas Gerais had issued an alert for heavy rain in the Capitólio region with the possibility of "water head", warning members of the public to "avoid waterfalls during the rainy season".

== Collapse ==
The rockfall occurred around 12:30 (local time) at a canyon of Furnas Lake in the municipality of Capitólio, with four tourist boats nearby. About 70 to 100 people were at the site, which was isolated and closed. The Minas Gerais Fire Department initially reported that a "waterspout" near the rocks had caused the rockfall. However, according to Gustavo Cunha Melo, a specialist in risk management, the waterspout may have acted as a trigger for the landslide, but it was not necessarily the cause of the problem. He opined the rock would have fallen off due to erosion in any case. A fire department spokesman said the rock formation at the site and the rains in the region made it easier for the rockfall to occur, and that the way the rock fell aggravated the situation.

The Air Operations Battalion, in addition to divers, were mobilized to work at the site. More than 40 soldiers were dispatched to the region and an aircraft started to search. The Furnas River Police deployed search and rescue teams to the site. All of the victims were taken to hospitals in the region; three were taken to São José da Barra, and two more who were seriously injured and had fractures in the upper limbs were taken to Piumhi and Passos in ambulances in the municipality. Another stable patient had a trauma to the face, while others had minor injuries.

== Victims ==
Thirty-four people were involved in the rockfall. Ten deaths were confirmed by the Fire Department by 9 January. Of the ten deaths, nine were adults and one was a teenager. Thirty-two other people were treated, most with minor injuries. Twenty-seven were attended to and released, twenty-three of them from Santa Casa de Capitólio and four from Santa Casa de São José da Barra. Four were hospitalized.

== Investigation ==
The Brazilian Navy said they would investigate the incident.

The specialist in risk management and safety Gerardo Portela reported in an interview with CNN Brasil that images published on social networks showed that the occupants of the vessels were warned by people around about the risk of the structure collapsing, but the initiative to move away from the region of risk was slow to happen: "These last images reveal that there was time to prevent people from being hit, there were visual signs, there were probably noises, because pieces of rock were lying on the water, it's regrettable". Portela also reported that there was "unpreparedness": "we observed that the boats were overcrowded, with the bow pointed at the risk location, it should be positioned with the bow on the opposite side in case of a possible need to abandon the area. Succession of failures, people farther away were realizing the risk, but they, even being professionals, could not get the right attention".

== Reactions ==
A video began circulating on social networks showing the disaster, and its veracity was confirmed. The governor of Minas Gerais, Romeu Zema, lamented the collapse on social networks: "We are currently suffering the pain of a tragedy in our state, due to heavy rains, which caused the loosening of a wall of stones at Furnas Lake in Capitólio. The Government of Minas is present from the first moments through the Civil Defense and Fire Department". Zema also expressed solidarity with the families of the victims: "I sympathize with the families in this difficult time. We will continue to act to provide the necessary support." President Jair Bolsonaro called the incident a "regrettable disaster".
