= Leandre Dal Ponte =

Brazilian politician

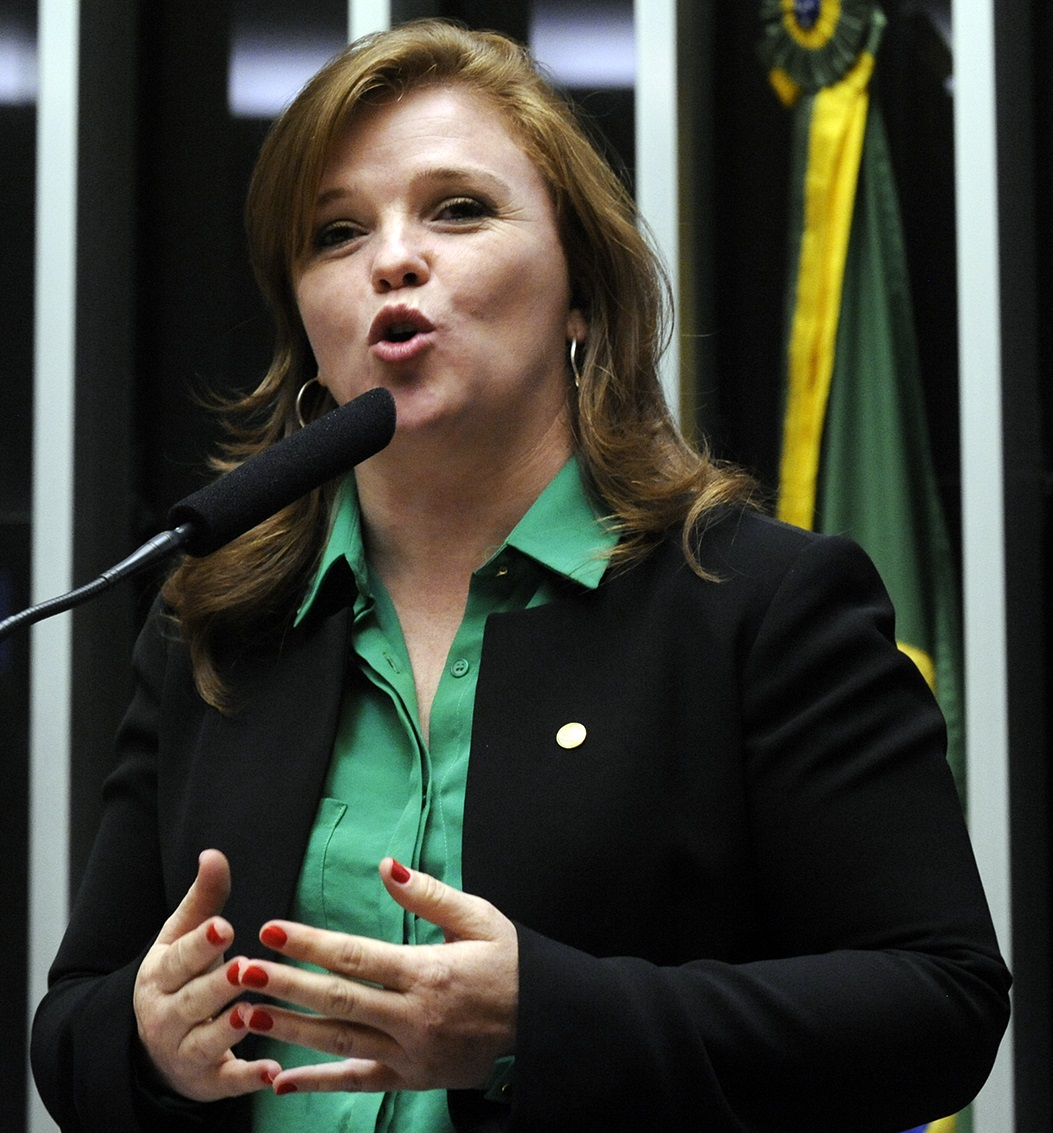
- Da Ponte in March 2016

Federal Deputy for Paraná
- In office 1 February 2011 – 31 January 2019

Municipal Secretary of Health for Saudade do Iguaçu
- In office 1997–2000

Personal details
- Born: 20 December 1975 (age 50) Pato Branco, Paraná, Brazil
- Party: PV

Leandre Dal Ponte (born 20 December 1975), sometimes known more simply as Leandre, is a Brazilian politician and civil engineer. She has spent her political career representing her home state of Paraná, having served as state representative from 2015.

== Personal life ==
She is the daughter of Nadilo Dal Ponte and Maria Selvina. Prior to becoming a politician Pal Ponte worked as a civil engineer, and is an alumnus of Universidade Positivo. From 1997 to 2000 she served as the municipal secretary of health for the municipality of Saudade do Iguaçu.

== Political career ==
Dal Ponte voted in favor of the impeachment motion of then-president Dilma Rousseff. She would later vote in favor of opening a similar corruption investigation against Rousseff's successor Michel Temer, and voted in favor of the proposed 2017 Brazilian labor reforms.
