= Rubens Pereira Júnior =

Brazilian politician (born 1984)

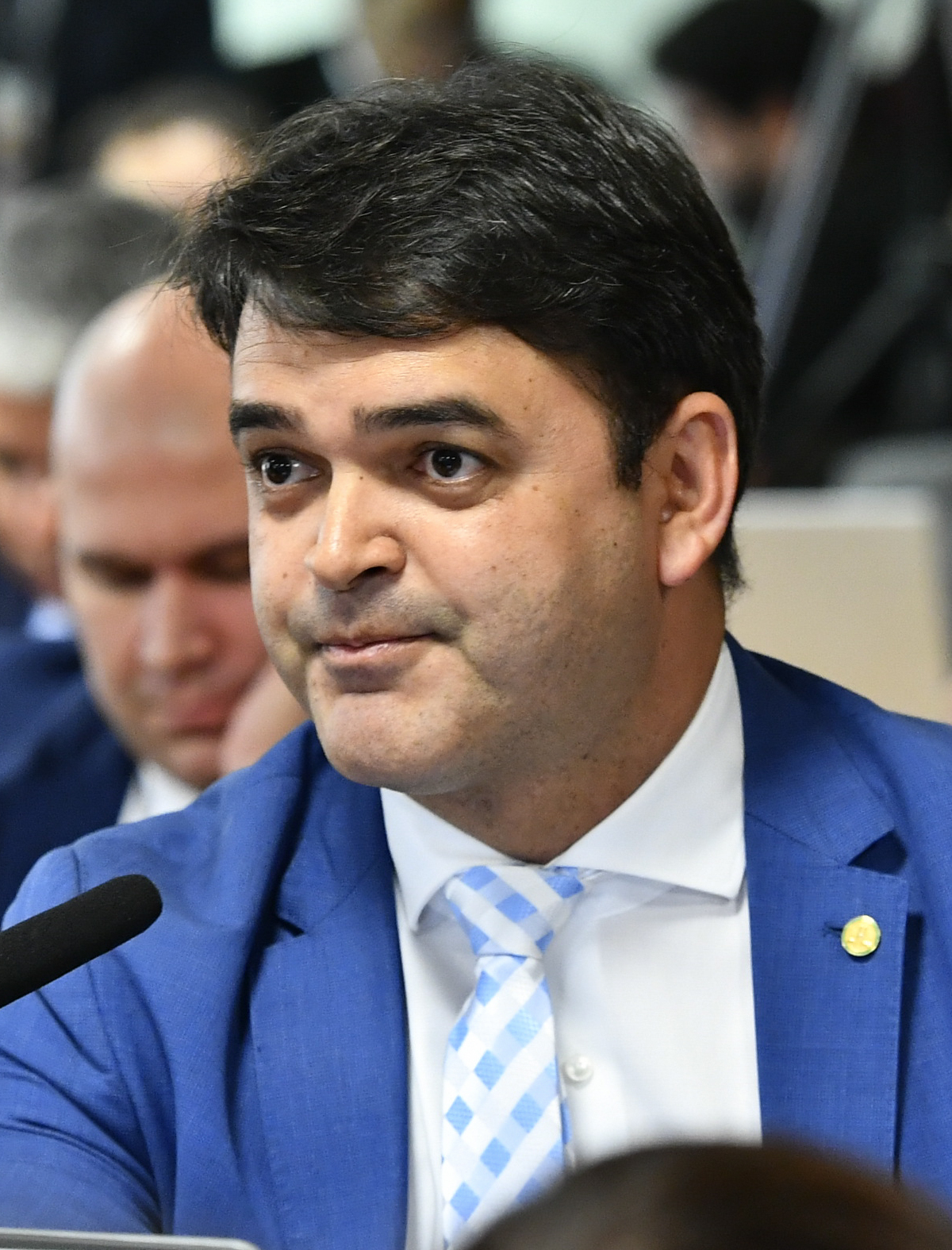
- Pereira in 2023

Member of the Chamber of Deputies
- Incumbent
- Assumed office 1 February 2015
- Constituency: Maranhão

Member of the Legislative Assembly of Maranhão
- In office 1 February 2007 – 1 February 2015
- Constituency: At-large

Personal details
- Born: Rubens Pereira e Silva Júnior; 16 March 1984 (age 42) São Luís, Maranhão, Brazil
- Party: PT (since 2022)
- Other political affiliations: PSC (2003–2005); PRTB (2005–2009); PCdoB (2009–2022)
- Profession: Lawyer

Rubens Pereira e Silva Júnior (born 16 March 1984) is a Brazilian politician serving as a member of the Chamber of Deputies since 2015. From 2007 to 2014, he was a member of the Legislative Assembly of Maranhão. He is the son of Rubens Pereira.
