= Emidinho Madeira =

Brazilian politician (born 1967)

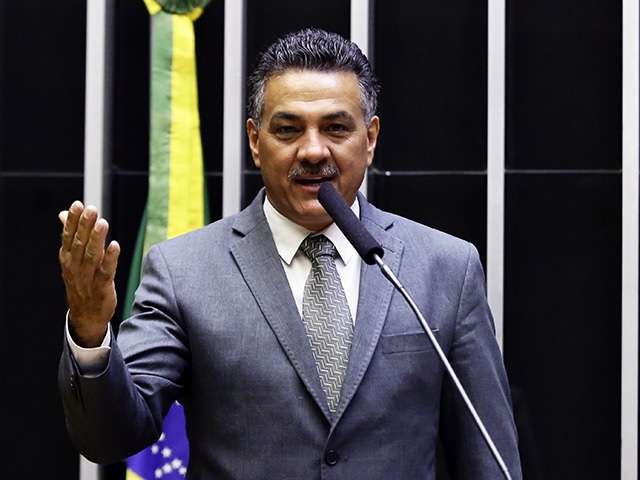
- Madeira in 2021

Member of the Chamber of Deputies
- Incumbent
- Assumed office 1 February 2019
- Constituency: Minas Gerais

Personal details
- Born: 10 March 1967 (age 59)
- Party: Liberal Party (since 2022)

Emídio Alves Madeira Júnior (born 10 March 1967), better known as Emidinho Madeira, is a Brazilian politician serving as a member of the Chamber of Deputies since 2019. From 2015 to 2019, he was a member of the Legislative Assembly of Minas Gerais.
