= Itarema =

Municipality in Ceará, Brazil

Coordinates: 2°55′24″S 39°54′52″W

- Municipality
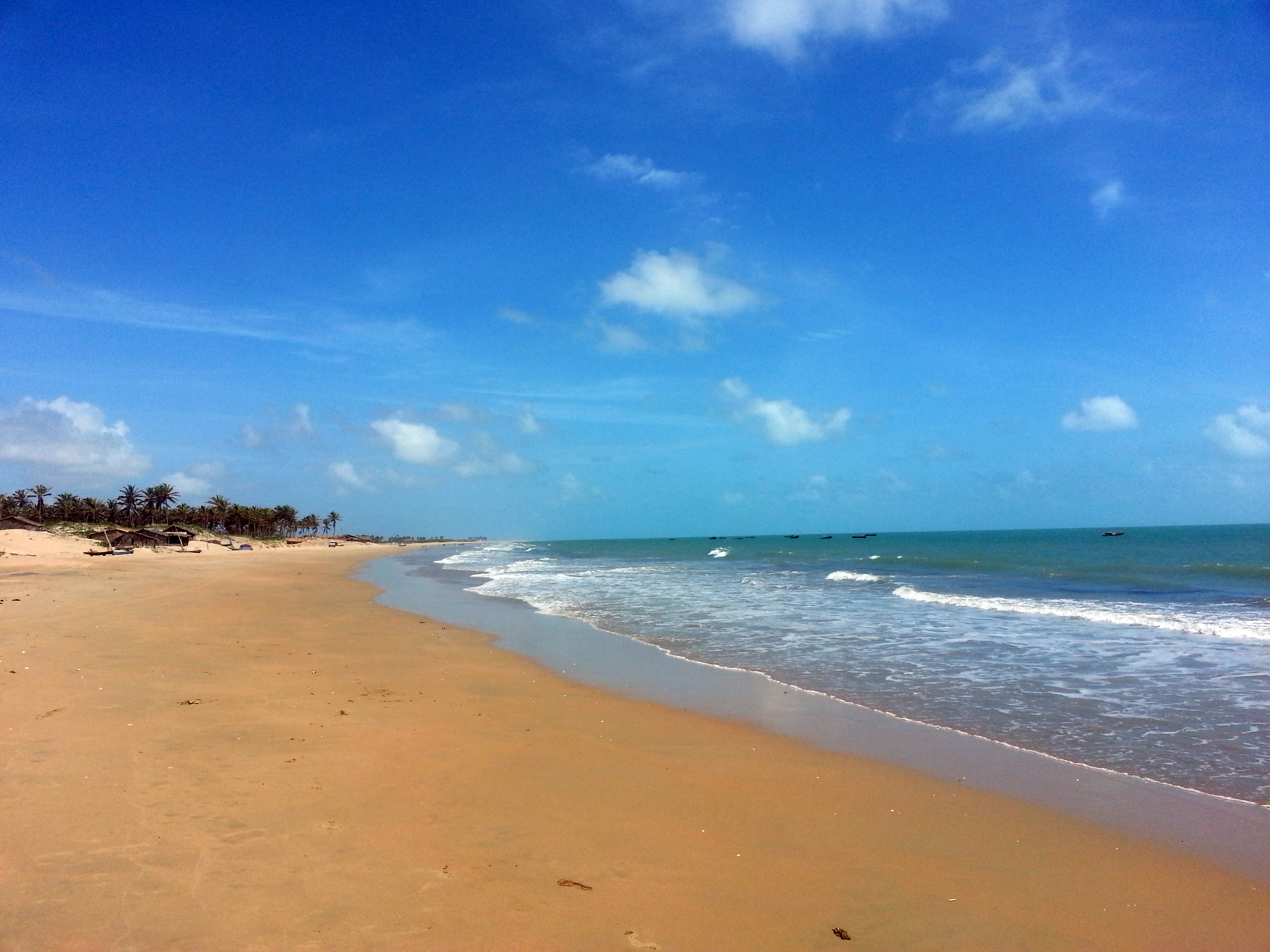

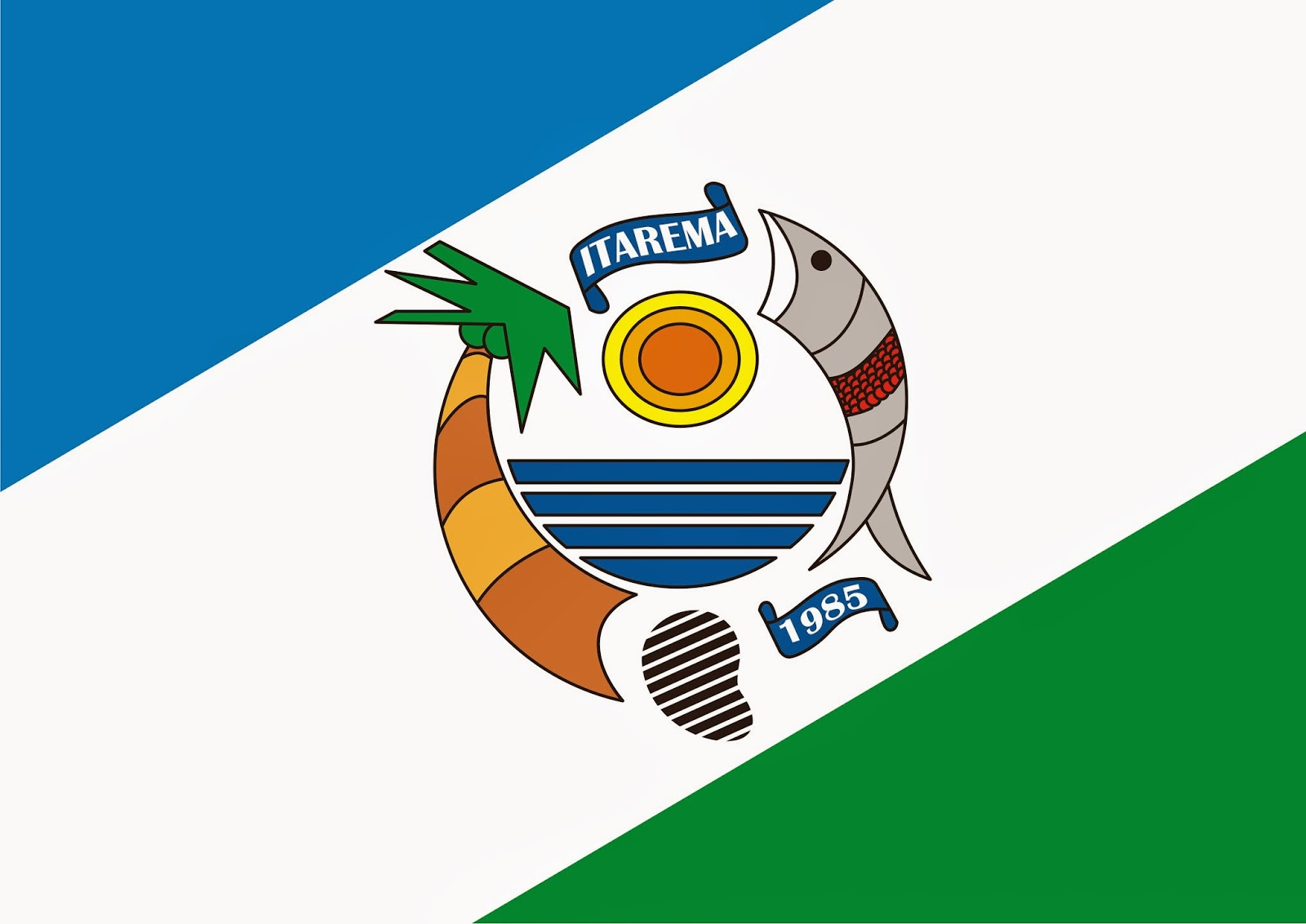
- Flag
- Interactive map of Itarema
- Country: Brazil
- Region: Nordeste
- State: Ceará
- Mesoregion: Noroeste Cearense

Population (2020)
  - Total: 42,215
- Time zone: UTC−3 (BRT)

Itarema is a municipality in the state of Ceará in the Northeast region of Brazil.

== See also ==
- List of municipalities in Ceará
