= Gilson Daniel =

Brazilian politician (born 1978)

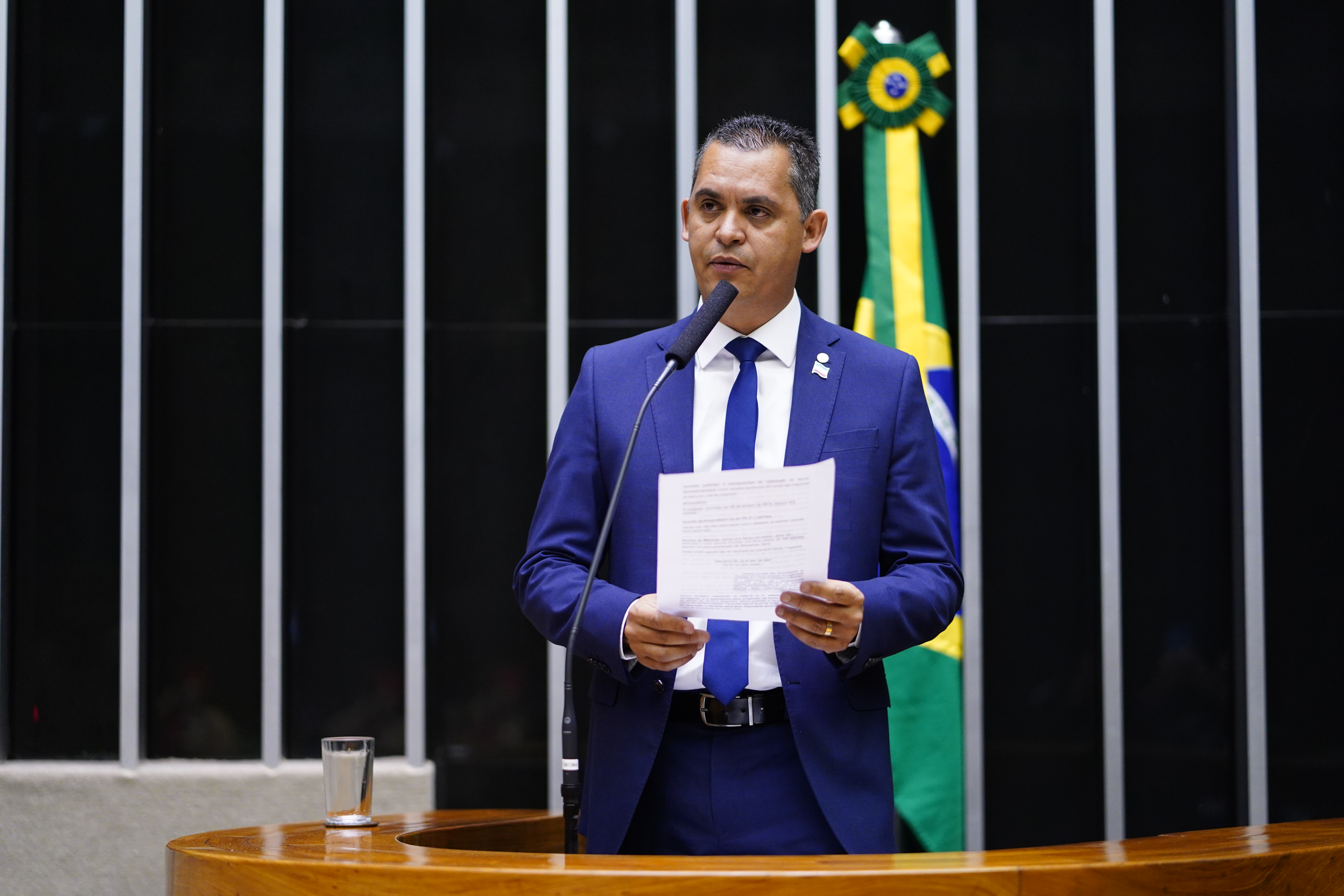
- Daniel in 2023

Member of the Chamber of Deputies
- Incumbent
- Assumed office 1 February 2023
- Constituency: Espírito Santo

Mayor of Viana
- In office 1 January 2013 – 1 January 2021
- Preceded by: Angela Maria Sias
- Succeeded by: Wanderson Bueno

Member of the Municipal Chamber of Viana
- In office 1 January 2009 – 1 January 2013
- Constituency: At-large

Personal details
- Born: Gilson Daniel Batista; 17 July 1978 (age 48) Duque de Caxias, Rio de Janeiro, Brazil
- Party: PODE (since 2017)
- Other political affiliations: PTdoB (2003–2007); PV (2007–2017)

Gilson Daniel Batista (born 17 July 1978) is a Brazilian politician serving as a member of the Chamber of Deputies since 2023. From 2013 to 2020, he served as mayor of Viana.
