= Mauricio Marcon =

Brazilian politician (born 1987)

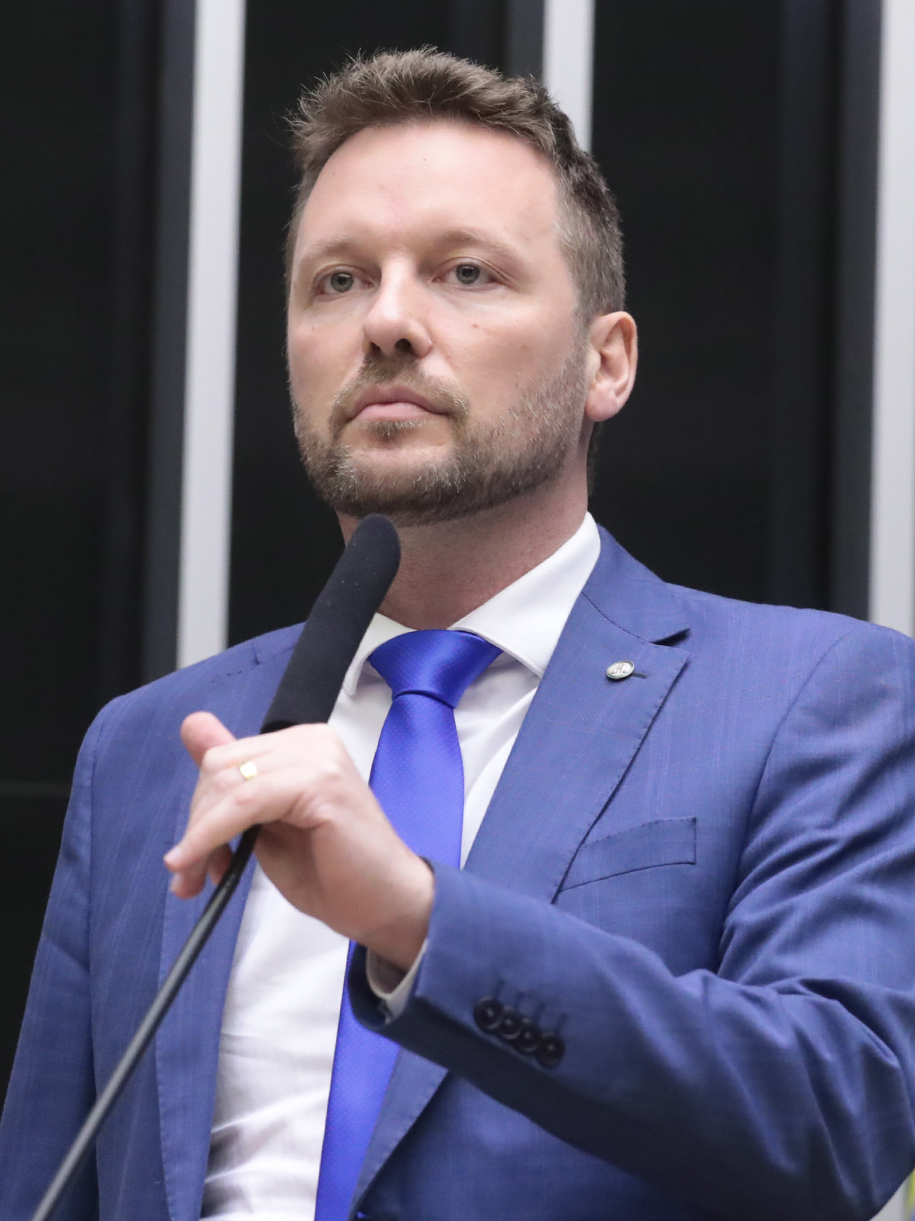
- Marcon in 2024

Member of the Chamber of Deputies
- Incumbent
- Assumed office 1 February 2023
- Constituency: Rio Grande do Sul

Member of the Municipal Chamber of Caxias do Sul
- In office 1 January 2021 – 1 February 2023
- Constituency: At-large

Personal details
- Born: Mauricio Bedin Marcon; 24 January 1987 (age 39) Caxias do Sul, Rio Grande do Sul, Brazil
- Party: PL (since 2025)
- Other political affiliations: PSDB (2005–2016); NOVO (2016–2021); PODE (2021–2025)
- Profession: Economist

Mauricio Marcon (born 24 January 1987) is a Brazilian politician serving as a member of the Chamber of Deputies since 2023. From 2021 to 2022, he was a city councillor of Caxias do Sul.
