= Julio Cesar Ribeiro =

Brazilian politician (born 1975)

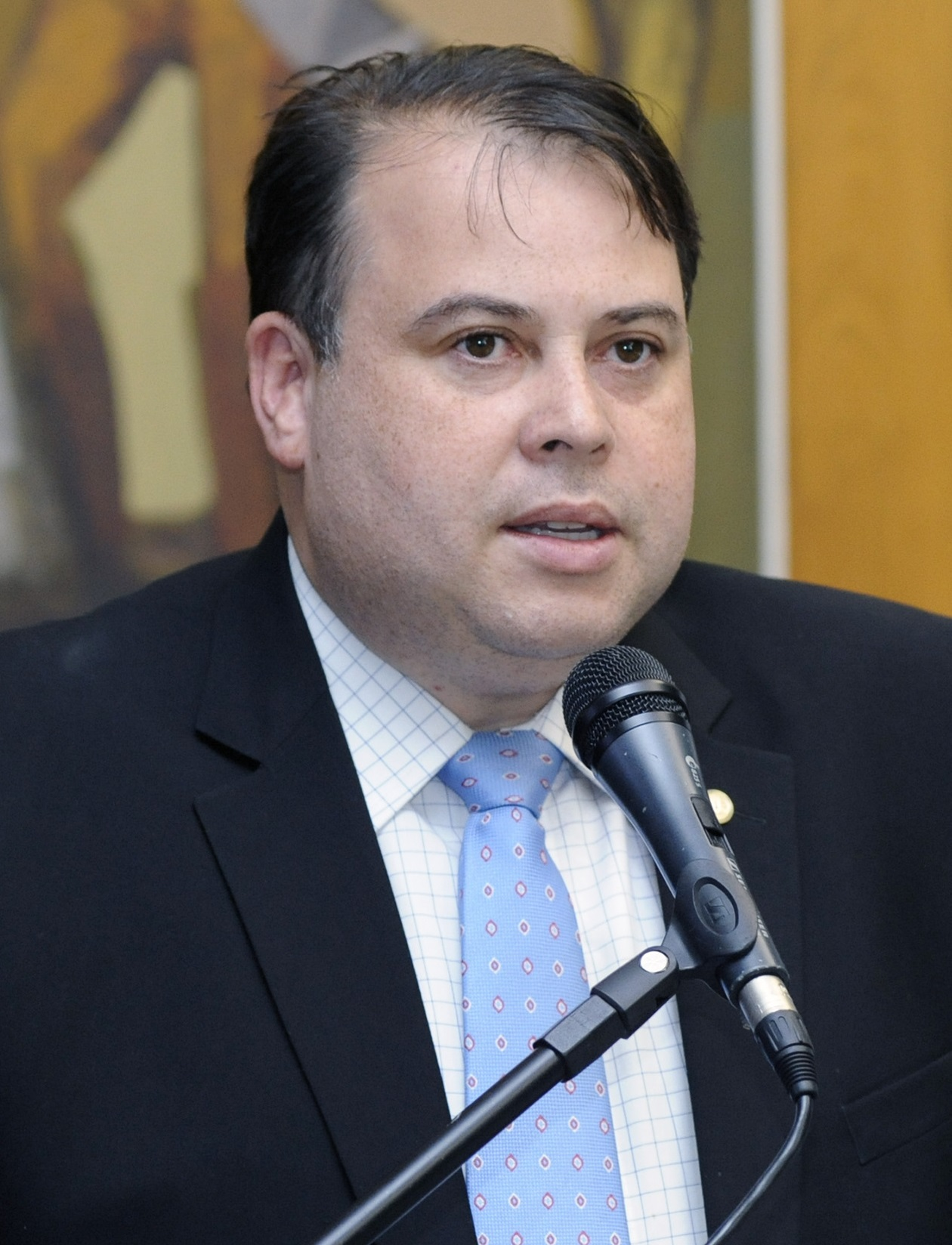
- Ribeiro in 2019

Member of the Chamber of Deputies
- Incumbent
- Assumed office 1 February 2019
- Constituency: Federal District

Personal details
- Born: 24 February 1975 (age 51)
- Party: Republicans (since 2011)

Julio Cesar Ribeiro (born 24 February 1975) is a Brazilian politician serving as a member of the Chamber of Deputies since 2019. From 2015 to 2018, he was a member of the Legislative Chamber of the Federal District.

Ribeiro is the current president of the Brazil/Australia parliamentary group, with a parliamentary group meaning to bolster Brazil's relations with another country's parliament.
