= Arthur Oliveira Maia =

Brazilian politician (born 1964)

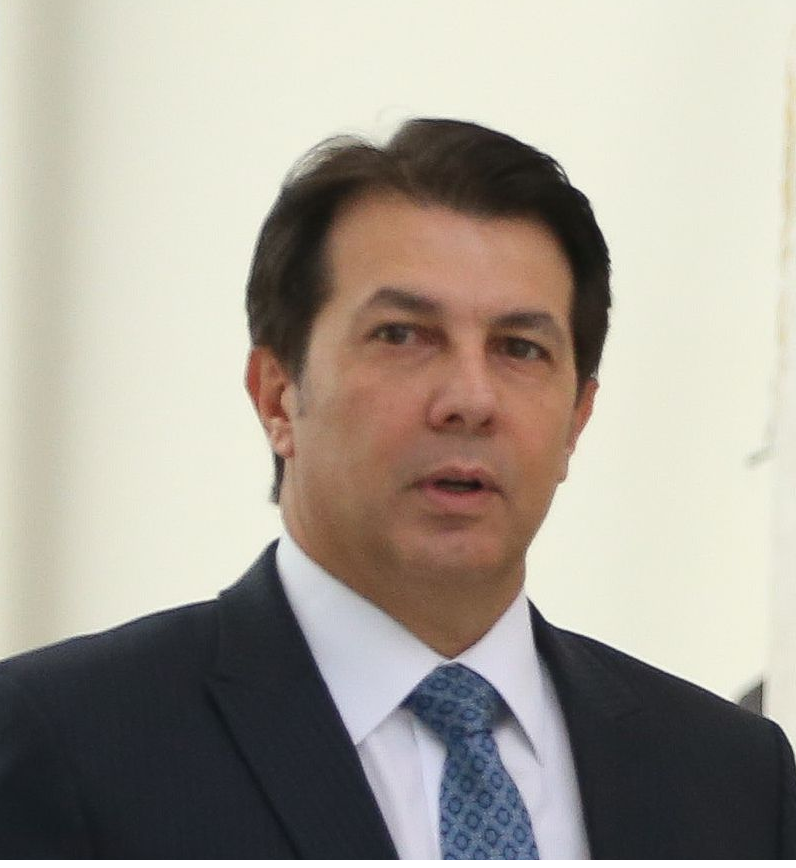
- Maia in 2017

Member of the Chamber of Deputies
- Incumbent
- Assumed office 1 February 2011
- Constituency: Bahia

Personal details
- Born: 17 August 1964 (age 62)
- Party: Brazil Union (since 2022)

Arthur de Oliveira Maia da Silva (born 17 August 1964) is a Brazilian politician serving as a member of the Chamber of Deputies since 2011. He was a member of the Legislative Assembly of Bahia from 1991 to 1992 and from 1999 to 2011. From 1993 to 1996, he served as mayor of Bom Jesus da Lapa.
