= Pedro Aihara =

Brazilian politician (born 1993)

Member of the Chamber of Deputies
- Incumbent
- Assumed office 1 February 2023
- Constituency: Minas Gerais

Personal details
- Born: February 16, 1993 (age 33) Belo Horizonte, Minas Gerais, Brazil
- Party: Democratic Renewal Party (since 2023)

Pedro Doshikazu Pianchão Aihara (born February 16, 1993) is a Brazilian politician serving as a member of the Chamber of Deputies since 2023. He previously served as spokesperson for the Military Fire Department of Minas Gerais.

In 2019, Aihara responded to the Brumadinho dam disaster. In 2021, he responded to the Piedade de Caratinga Beechcraft King Air crash. In 2022, he responded to the Capitólio rockfall.

At the age of eighteen, in 2011, he joined the Military Fire Department of the State of Minas Gerais. He holds a law degree from the Federal University of Minas Gerais, a specialization in Project Management from the University of São Paulo, a specialization in Disaster Management from Yamaguchi University, and a degree in military sciences, with an emphasis on disaster management and prevention, from the Fire Department. He holds a master's degree in Human Rights from UFMG.
