= Rafael Fera =

Brazilian politician (born 1990)

Member of the Chamber of Deputies
- Incumbent
- Assumed office 31 July 2025
- Preceded by: Lebrão
- Constituency: Rondônia

Personal details
- Born: 6 February 1990 (age 36)
- Party: Podemos

Rafael Bento Pereira (born 6 February 1990), better known as Rafael Fera, is a Brazilian politician serving as a member of the Chamber of Deputies since 2025. He replaced Lebrão following an election recount.
