= Stefano Aguiar =

Brazilian politician (born 1976)

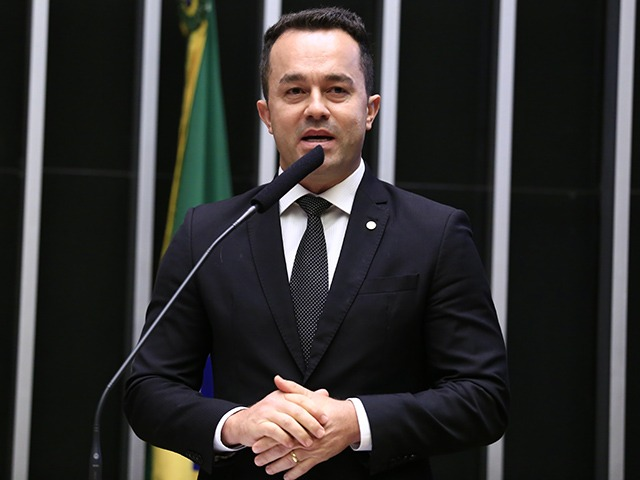

Member of the Chamber of Deputies
- Incumbent
- Assumed office 1 January 2015
- Constituency: Minas Gerais

Personal details
- Born: Stefano Aguiar dos Santos; 3 March 1976 Belo Horizonte, Minas Gerais, Brazil
- Party: PSD (since 2016)
- Other political affiliations: PSC (2009–2013); PSB (2013–2016)
- Occupation: Businessman, evangelical pastor

Stefano Aguiar dos Santos (born 3 March 1976) more commonly known as Stefano Aguiar is a Brazilian politician and pastor. He has spent his political career representing his home state of Minas Gerais, having served as state representative since 2015.

== Personal life ==
He is the child of Geraldo Aguiar dos Santos and Maria Aparecida de Oliveira Santos. Aguiar is a pastor, theologian, and secretary of the Foursquare Gospel church. His father Geraldo Aguiar, as well as his uncles Mario de Oliveira and Antônio Genaro are also pastors of the foursquare church.

== Political career ==
Aguiar served as a caretacker role of Federal deputy after his uncle Mario de Oliveira resigned in 2012.

Aguiar voted in favor of the impeachment of then-president Dilma Rousseff. Aguiar voted against the 2017 Brazilian labor reform, and would vote in favor of a corruption investigation into Rousseff's successor Michel Temer.
