= Renilce Nicodemos =

Brazilian politician (born 1976)

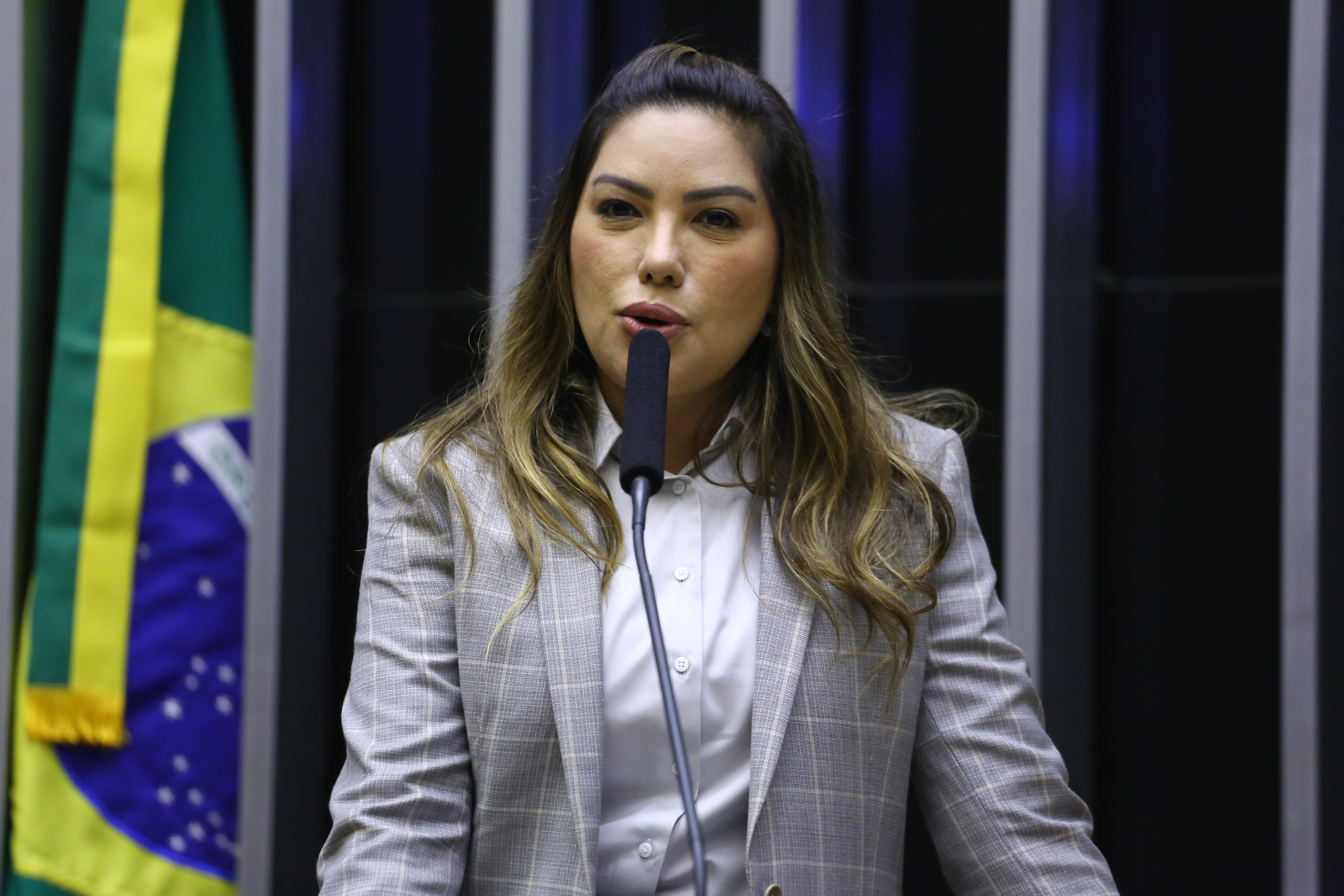
- Nicodemos in 2023

Member of the Chamber of Deputies
- Incumbent
- Assumed office 1 February 2023
- Constituency: Pará

Personal details
- Born: 8 December 1976 (age 49)
- Party: Brazilian Democratic Movement (since 2019)

Renilce Conceição Nicodemos de Albuquerque (born 8 December 1976) is a Brazilian politician serving as a member of the Chamber of Deputies since 2023. From 2019 to 2022, she was a member of the Legislative Assembly of Pará.
