= Meire Serafim =

Brazilian politician (born 1975)

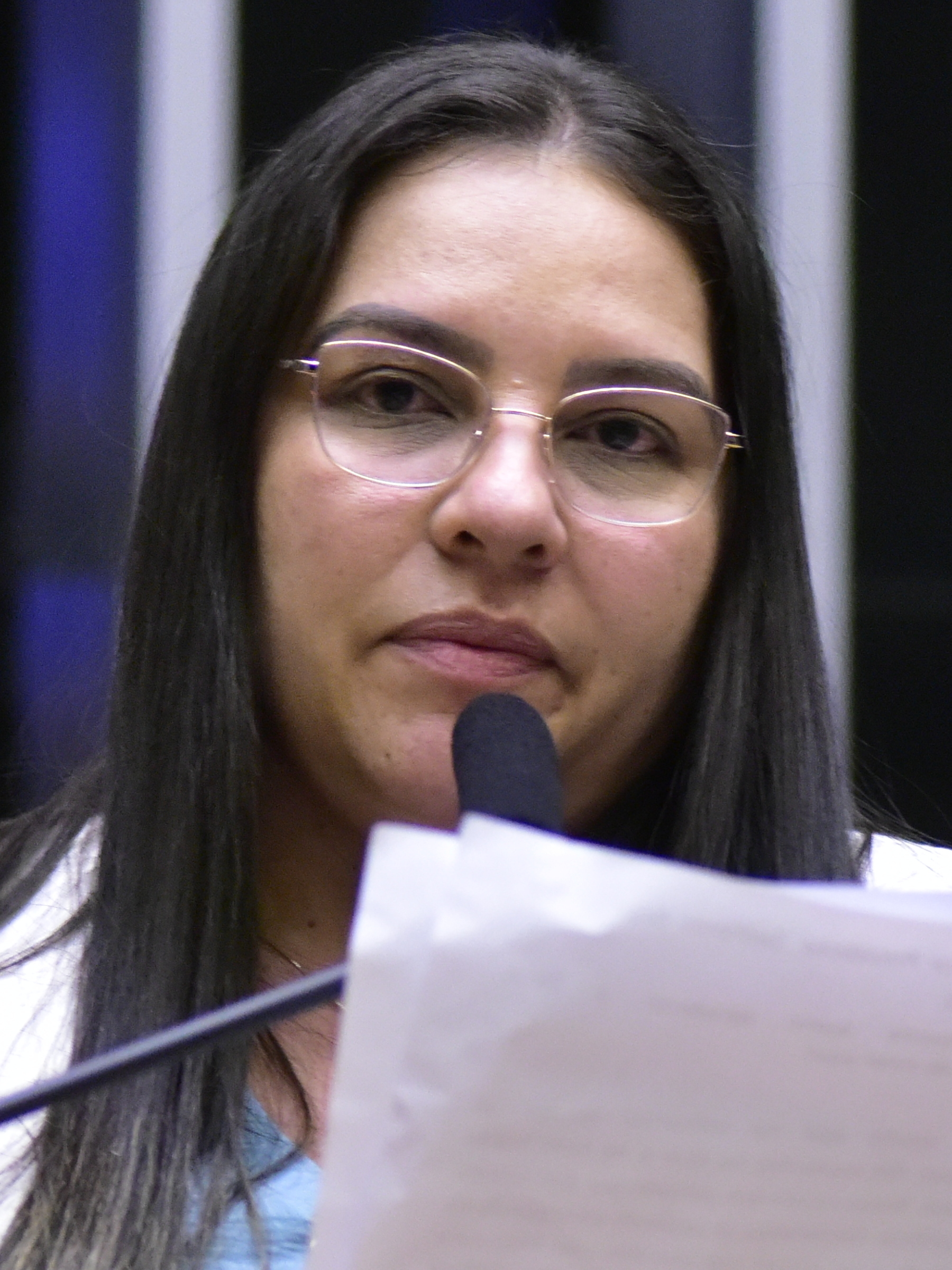
- Serafim in 2023

Member of the Chamber of Deputies
- Incumbent
- Assumed office 1 February 2023
- Constituency: Acre

Personal details
- Born: 10 February 1975 (age 51)
- Party: Brazil Union (since 2022)

Rozimeire Ribeiro Andrade, better known as Meire Serafim (born 10 February 1975), is a Brazilian politician serving as a member of the Chamber of Deputies since 2023. From 2019 to 2022, she was a member of the Legislative Assembly of Acre.
