= Florentino Neto =

Brazilian politician (born 1969)

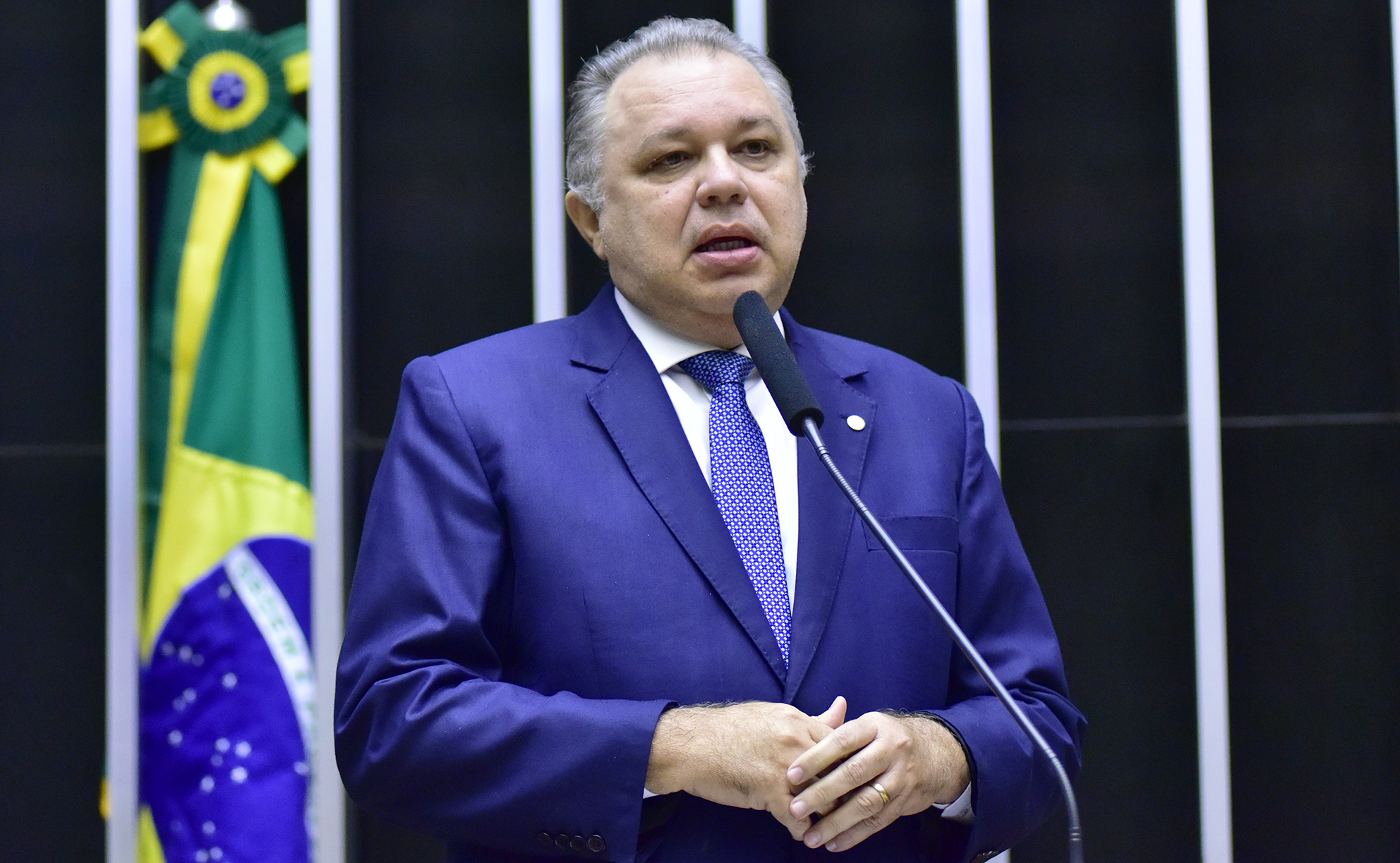
- Florentino Neto in 2023

Member of the Chamber of Deputies
- Incumbent
- Assumed office 1 February 2023
- Constituency: Piauí

Personal details
- Born: 5 October 1969 (age 57)
- Party: Workers' Party

Florentino Alves Veras Neto (born 5 October 1969) is a Brazilian politician serving as a member of the Chamber of Deputies since 2023. From 2013 to 2016, he served as mayor of Parnaíba.
