= Fábio Teruel =

Brazilian politician (born 1971)

Member of the Chamber of Deputies
- Incumbent
- Assumed office 1 February 2023
- Constituency: São Paulo

Personal details
- Born: 22 October 1971 (age 54)
- Party: Brazilian Democratic Movement (since 2022)
- Parent: Ataíde Teruel (mother)

Fábio Eduardo de Oliveira Teruel (born 22 October 1971) is a Brazilian politician serving as a member of the Chamber of Deputies since 2023. He is the son of Ataíde Teruel.
