= Mersinho Lucena =

Brazilian politician (born 1981)

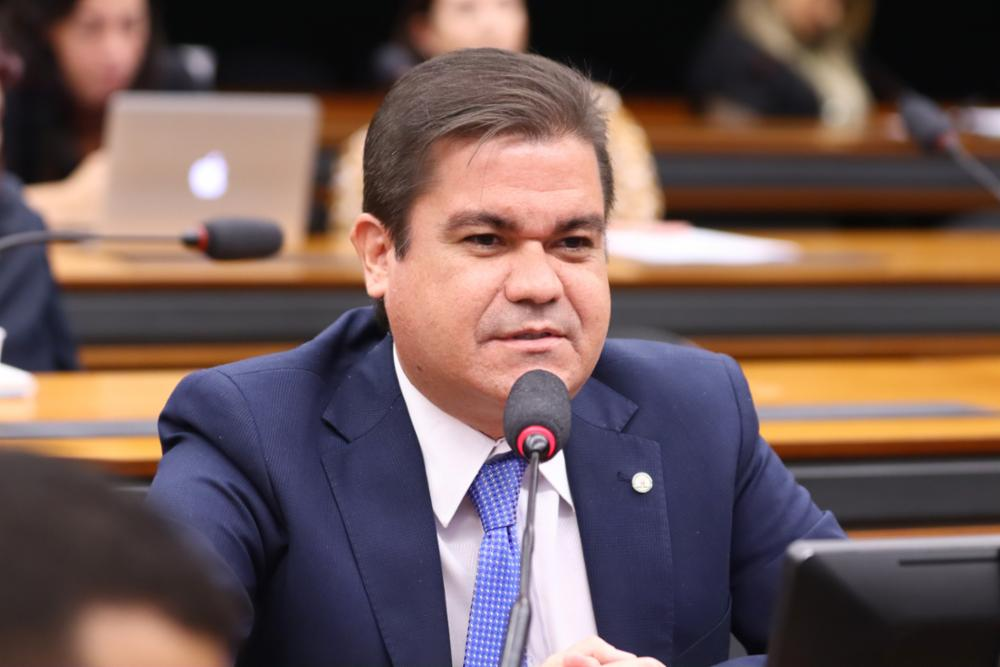
- Lucena in 2023

Member of the Chamber of Deputies
- Incumbent
- Assumed office 1 February 2023
- Constituency: Paraíba

Personal details
- Born: 8 February 1981 (age 45)
- Party: Progressistas (since 2022)
- Parent: Cícero Lucena (father)

Francisco Emerson Assis de Lucena (born 8 February 1981), better known as Mersinho Lucena, is a Brazilian politician serving as a member of the Chamber of Deputies since 2023. He is the son of Cícero Lucena.
