= Thiago Flores =

Brazilian politician (born 1980)

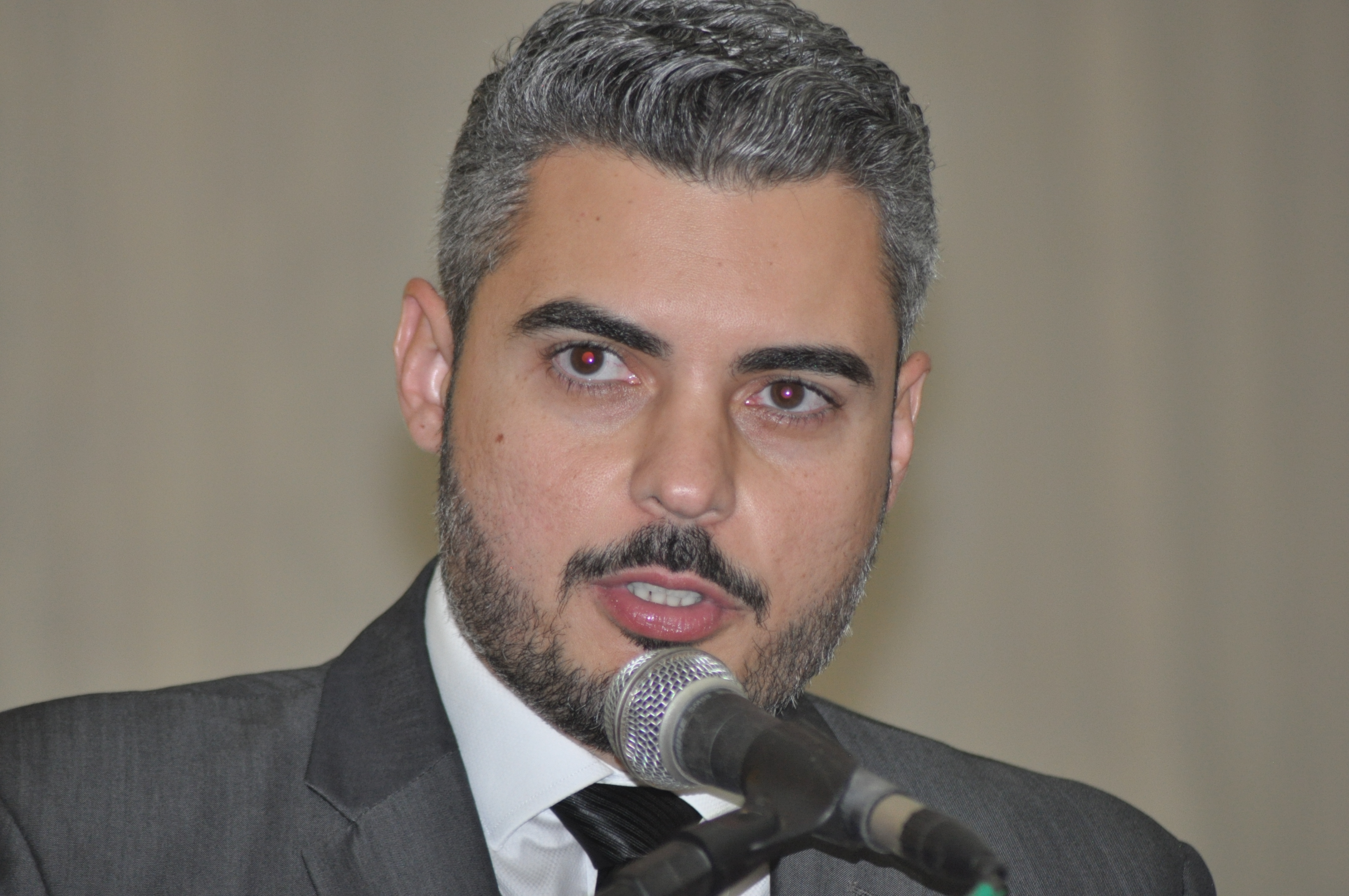
- Flores in 2017

Member of the Chamber of Deputies
- Incumbent
- Assumed office 1 February 2023
- Constituency: Rondônia

Personal details
- Born: 3 July 1980 (age 46)
- Party: Republicans (since 2024)

Thiago Leite Flores Pereira (born 3 July 1980) is a Brazilian politician serving as a member of the Chamber of Deputies since 2023. From 2017 to 2020, he served as mayor of Ariquemes.
