= Aluísio Mendes =

Brazilian politician (born 1961)

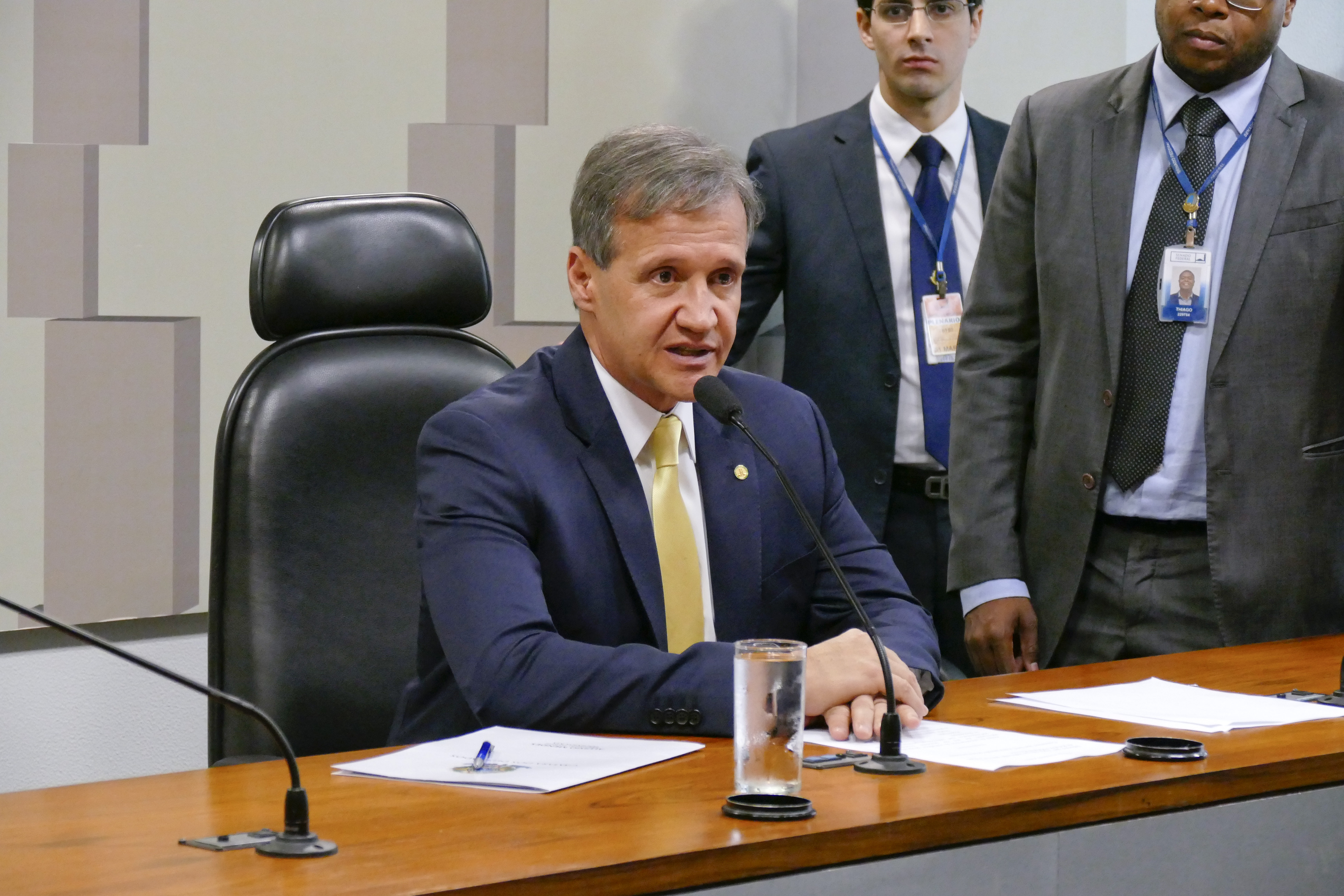
- Mendes in 2018

Member of the Chamber of Deputies
- Incumbent
- Assumed office 1 February 2015
- Constituency: Maranhão

Personal details
- Born: Aluísio Guimarães Mendes Filho; 11 November 1961 (age 65) Belo Horizonte, Minas Gerais, Brazil
- Party: Republicanos (2023–present)
- Other political affiliations: PMDB (1980–1993); PL (1993–2006); PR (2006–2013); PSDC (2013–2015); PMB (2015–2016); PODE (2016–2019); PSC (2019–2023)
- Profession: Lawyer

Aluísio Guimarães Mendes Filho (born 11 November 1961) is a Brazilian politician serving as a member of the Chamber of Deputies since 2015. From 2010 to 2014, he served as secretary of public security of Maranhão.
