= Henderson Pinto =

Brazilian politician (born 1976)

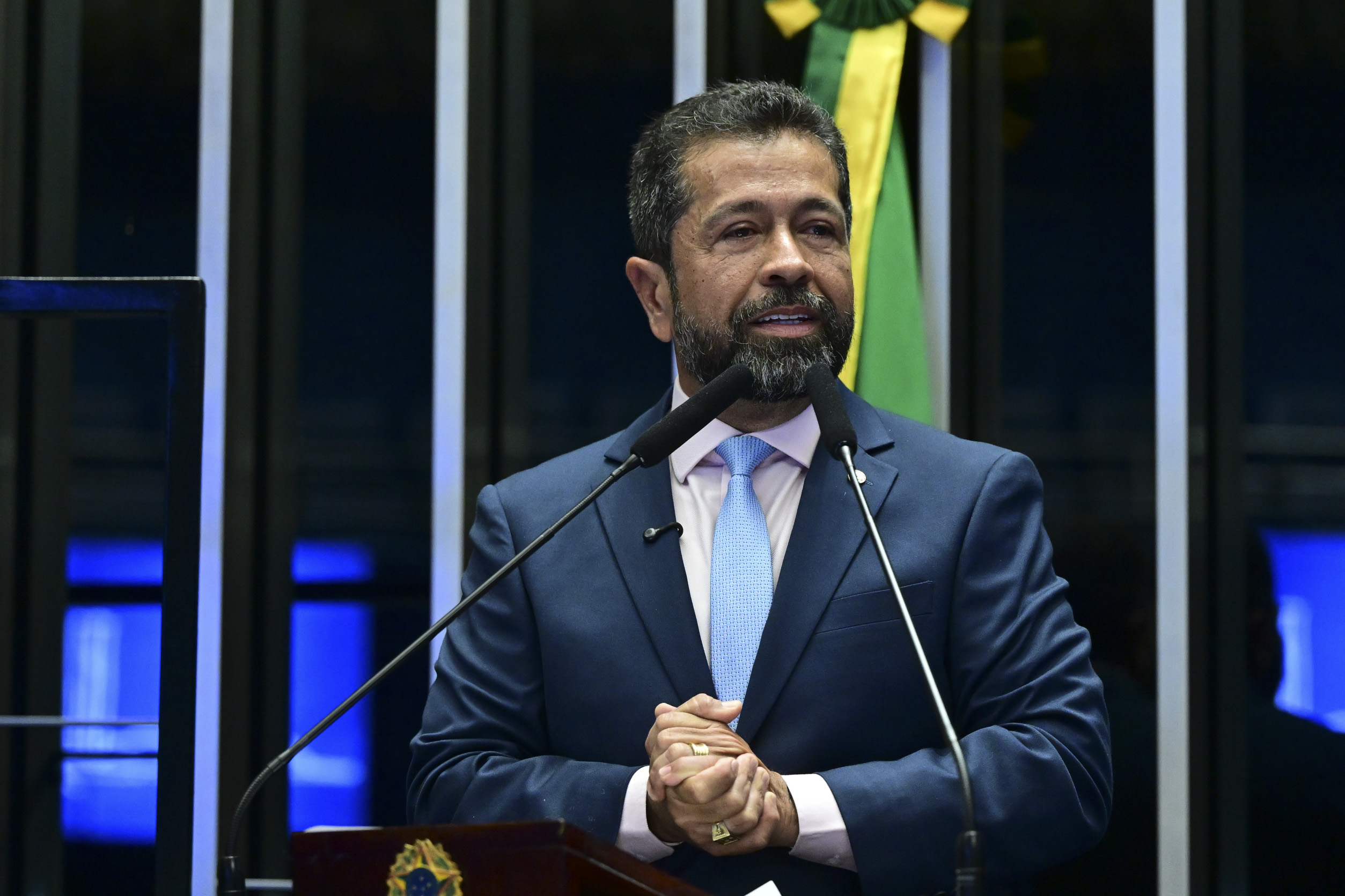
- Pinto in 2025

Member of the Chamber of Deputies
- Incumbent
- Assumed office 1 February 2023
- Constituency: Pará

Personal details
- Born: 25 April 1976 (age 49)
- Party: Brazilian Democratic Movement (since 2018)

Henderson Lira Pinto (born 25 April 1976) is a Brazilian politician serving as a member of the Chamber of Deputies since 2023. From 2013 to 2014, he served as chairman of the municipal council of Santarém.
