= Marcos Tavares (politician) =

Brazilian politician (born 1978)

Member of the Chamber of Deputies
- Incumbent
- Assumed office 1 February 2023
- Constituency: Rio de Janeiro

Member of the Municipal Chamber of Duque de Caxias
- In office 1 January 2013 – 1 February 2023
- Constituency: At-large

Personal details
- Born: Marcos Paulo Barbosa Tavares; 28 January 1978 (age 48) Duque de Caxias, Rio de Janeiro, Brazil
- Party: PDT (since 2022)
- Other political affiliations: PT (2003–2007); DC (2007–2019); Avante (2019–2022)

Marcos Paulo Barbosa Tavares (born 28 January 1978) is a Brazilian politician serving as a member of the Chamber of Deputies since 2023. From 2021 to 2022, he served as secretary of environment and animal protection of Duque de Caxias.
