= Saudade do Iguaçu =

- Municipality
- Flag Coat of arms

- Municipal location within the State of Paraná

- Location in Brazil
- Coordinates: 25.69444°S 52.61889°W
- Country: Brazil
- State: Paraná
- Municipality: Saudade do Iguaçu

Government
  - Mayor: Mauro Cesar Cenci

Area
  - Total: 152.085 km^{2} (58.720 sq mi)
- Elevation: 618 m (2,028 ft)

Population (2020)
  - Total: 5,539
  - Density: 36.42/km^{2} (94.33/sq mi)
- Demonym: saudadense
- Time zone: UTC−3 (BRT)

Saudade do Iguaçu is a municipality in the Brazilian state of Paraná. It has an area of 152.085 square kilometres (58.720 sq mi). It has a humid subtropical climate. As of 2020 the estimated population was 5,539. The municipality contains the Salto Santiago Hydroelectric Power Plant on the Iguazu River.

== History ==
In 1954, the Companhia Brasileira de Viação e Comércio (BRAVIACO) opened a road up to the small plateau that the present Saudade do Iguaçu occupies. A pioneer opened a farm there in 1955, and other settlers from Rio Grande do Sul and Santa Catarina followed. At first they planted beans and corn and raised pigs for their own consumption. The district of Saudade was created by state law nº 8, of 06-08-1973, part of the municipality of Chopinzinho. State law nº 9914 of 19 March 1992 raised the district to the category of a municipality with the name Saudade do Iguaçu.

== Geography ==
Saudade do Iguaçu is in the state of Paraná, Brazil. It has an area of 152.085 square kilometres (58.720 sq mi) as of 2018. The elevation above sea level is about 618 metres (2,028 ft).

It is named for a falls on the Iguazu River, a tributary of the Paraná River and the largest river in the state of Paraná, formed by the meeting of the Iraí and Atuba rivers in the eastern part of the Paraná municipality of Curitiba along its border with the municipalities of Pinhais and São José dos Pinhais. The Iguazu runs from east to west, with some parts serving as a natural border between Paraná and Santa Catarina. In one part of its lower course it forms the border between Brazil and Argentina's Misiones Province. The Salto Santiago Hydroelectric Power Plant on the Iguazu is in Saudade do Iguaçu.

=== Climate ===
The Köppen climate type is Cfa : humid subtropical climate. The average annual temperature is 20 °C (68 °F). The average annual rainfall is 2,634 millimetres (103.7 in).

Saudade do Iguaçu, Paraná (state)|Paraná

Climate chart (precipitation, max. and min. temperature)
J	F	M	A	M	J	J	A	S	O	N	D
199 27 19	268 27 18	197 26 18	214 24 15	205 19 12	500 18 11	125 19 12	57 22 13	242 24 13	188 27 15	173 28 16	263 29 18
- █ Average max. and min. temperatures in °C
- █ Precipitation totals in mm
Imperial conversion
J	F	M	A	M	J	J	A	S	O	N	D
7.8 81 66	11 81 64	7.8 79 64	8.4 75 59	8.1 66 54	20 64 52	4.9 66 54	2.2 72 55	9.5 75 55	7.4 81 59	6.8 82 61	10 84 64
- █ Average max. and min. temperatures in °F
- █ Precipitation totals in inches

== Demographics ==
The population in the 2010 census was 5,028. The estimated population as of 2019 was 5,500. Population density as of 2010 was 33.06 inhabitants per square kilometre (85.6/sq mi). As of 2010, 99% of the population had attended school between the ages of 6 and 14. Also as of 2010, the municipal Human Development Index was 0.699. This compares to 0.401 in 1991 and 0.577 in 2000.

On the 2010 census, religion was reported as Catholic by 4,263 people, Evangelical by 661 people and Animism by 0 people.

In 2017, the average monthly salary of formal workers was 2.7 minimum wages. Formally employed people were 22.5% of the total population. Households with monthly income of up to half a minimum wage per person represent 34.7% of the population. Recent estimates of GDP per capita:

== Health and sanitation ==
2.0% of households have adequate sanitation, 80.2% of urban households are on public roads with afforestation and 57% of urban households are on public roads with adequate urbanization (presence of manhole, sidewalk, pavement and curb). Annual hospitalizations due to diarrhea are 6.8 per 1,000 inhabitants. Deaths per 1,000 live births:

== Municipal finances ==
Recent figures for committed municipal expenditure:

Recent figures for realized municipal revenue:

== See also ==
- List of municipalities in Paraná

== Sources ==
- Brasil / Paraná (state)|Paraná / Saudade do Iguaçu, IBGE
- História: Saudade do Iguaçu, IBGE
- "Saudade do Iguaçu", Geonames
- Saudade do Iguaçu, Brazilian Institute of Geography and Statistics
- "Saudade do Iguaçu, Brazil", Mindat
- NASA Earth Observations Data Set Index, NASA, archived from the original on 28 November 2017
- NASA Earth Observations: Rainfall (1 month - TRMM), NASA/Tropical Rainfall Monitoring Mission, archived from the original on 11 May 2020
