= Gervásio Maia =

Brazilian politician (born 1975)

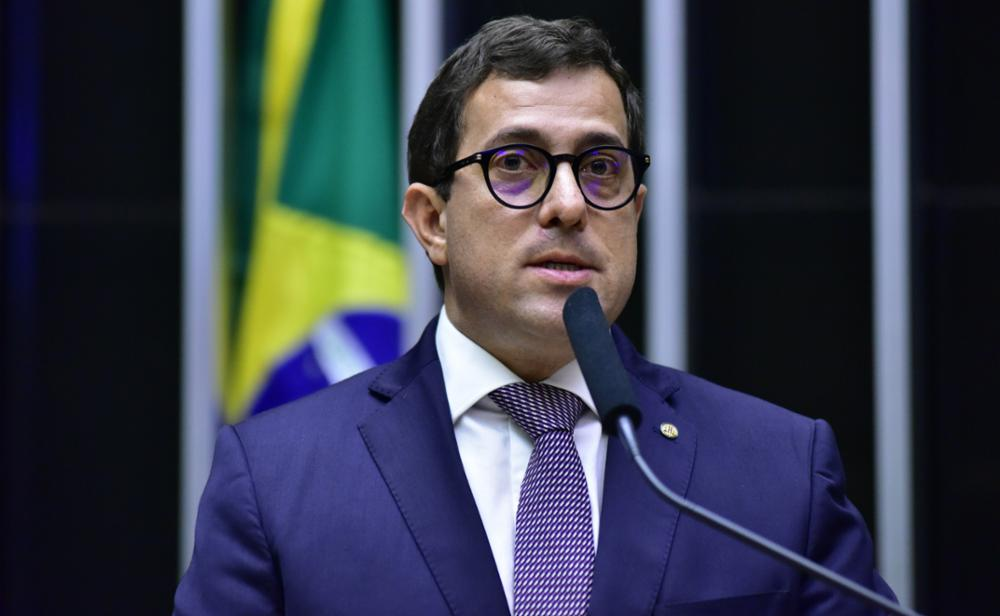
- Maia in 2023

Member of the Chamber of Deputies
- Incumbent
- Assumed office 1 February 2019
- Constituency: Paraíba

President of the Legislative Assembly of Paraíba
- In office 1 February 2017 – 1 February 2019
- Preceded by: Adriano Galdino
- Succeeded by: Adriano Galdino

Member of the Legislative Assembly of Paraíba
- In office 1 February 2003 – 1 February 2019
- Constituency: At-large

Personal details
- Born: Gervásio Agripino Maia; 14 April 1975 (age 51) São Paulo, Brazil
- Party: PCdoB (2026–present)
- Other political affiliations: PMDB (1999–2016); PSB (2016–2026)
- Profession: Lawyer

Gervásio Agripino Maia (born 14 April 1975) is a Brazilian politician serving as a member of the Chamber of Deputies since 2019. He was a member of the Legislative Assembly of Paraíba from 2003 to 2019, and served as president of the assembly from 2017 to 2019. He is the son of Gervásio Maia and the grandson of João Agripino.
