= Alex Santana (politician) =

Brazilian politician (born 1972)

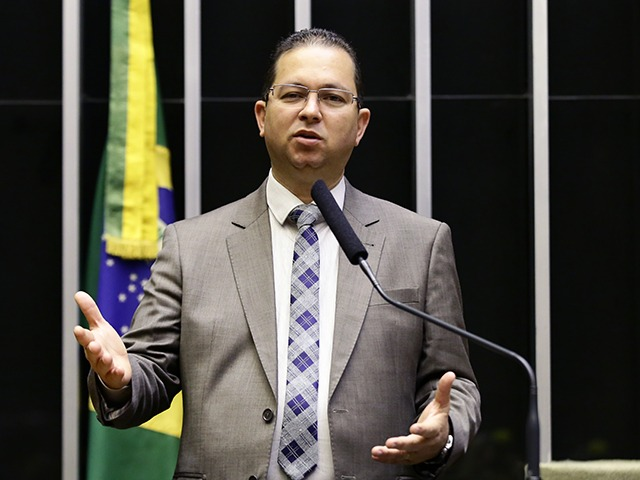
- Santana in 2019

Member of the Chamber of Deputies
- Incumbent
- Assumed office 1 February 2019
- Constituency: Bahia

Personal details
- Born: 22 June 1972 (age 54)
- Party: Republicans (since 2022)

Alex Marco Santana Sousa (born 22 June 1972) is a Brazilian politician serving as a member of the Chamber of Deputies since 2019. He has been a member of the Republicans since 2022.
