= Aliel Machado =

Brazilian politician (born 1989)

Member of the Chamber of Deputies
- Incumbent
- Assumed office 1 February 2015
- Constituency: Paraná

Member of the Municipal Chamber of Ponta Grossa
- In office 1 January 2013 – 1 February 2015
- Constituency: At-large

Personal details
- Born: Aliel Machado Bark; 26 February 1989 (age 37) Ponta Grossa, Paraná, Brazil
- Party: PV (since 2022)
- Other political affiliations: PCdoB (2007–2015); REDE (2015–2018); PSB (2018–2022)

Aliel Machado Bark (born 26 February 1989) is a Brazilian politician serving as a member of the Chamber of Deputies since 2015. From 2013 to 2014, he was a city councillor of Ponta Grossa.
