= Josenildo Abrantes =

Brazilian politician (born 1973)

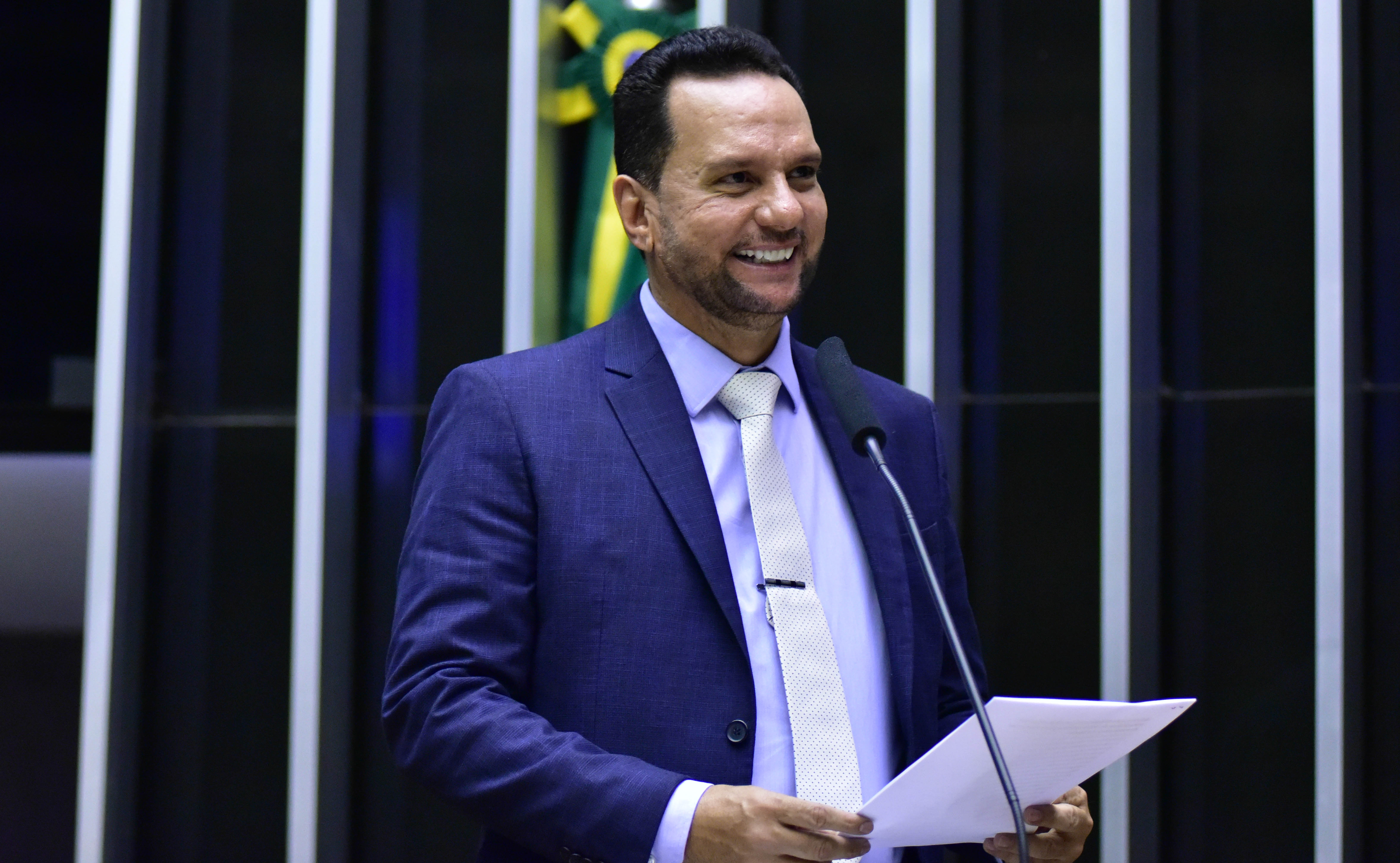
- Abrantes in 2023

Member of the Chamber of Deputies
- Incumbent
- Assumed office 1 February 2023
- Constituency: Amapá

Personal details
- Born: Josenildo Santos Abrantes; 29 March 1973 (age 53) Macapá, Amapá, Brazil
- Party: PDT
- Profession: Public servant

Josenildo Santos Abrantes (born 29 March 1973) is a Brazilian politician serving as a member of the Chamber of Deputies since 2023. From 2015 to 2022, he served as secretary of finance of Amapá.
