= 58th Legislature of the National Congress =

Upcoming meeting of the legislature of Brazil

58th Legislature of National Congress
←	57th	59th	→
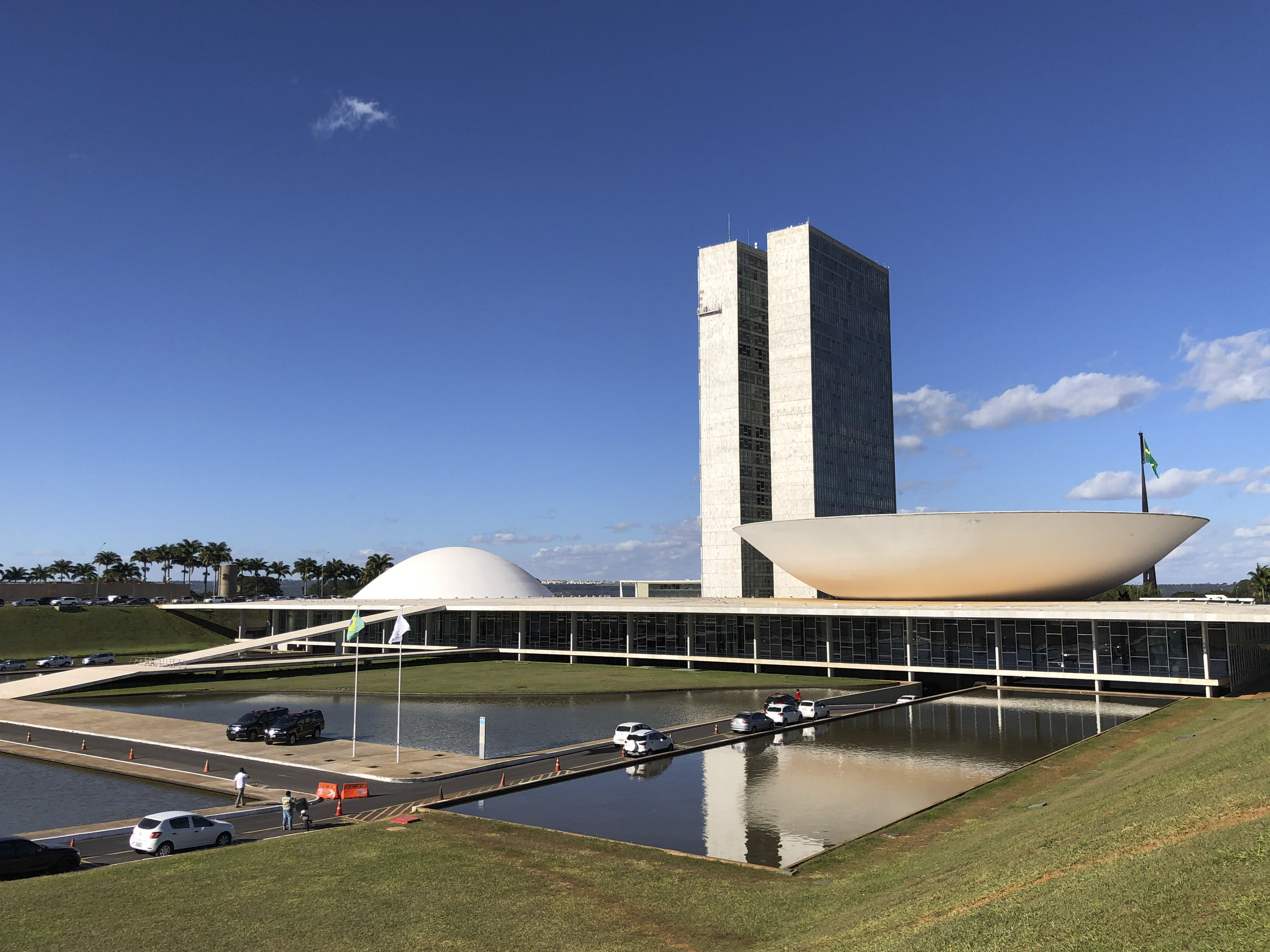
- National Congress building (2019)

Overview
- Legislative body: National Congress
- Meeting place: National Congress Palace
- Term: 1 February 2027 – 31 January 2031
- Election: 4 October 2026
- Government: Second Lula cabinet
- Website: congressonacional.leg.br

Federal Senate
- Members: 81 senators
- President of the Senate: TBD

Chamber of Deputies
- Members: 513 deputies
- President of the Chamber: TBD

Sessions
- 1st: 1 February 2027 – TBD

The 58th Legislature of the National Congress is the next meeting of the legislative branch of the federal government of Brazil, composed by the Chamber of Deputies and the Federal Senate. It resulted from the 2026 Brazilian legislative election and it will convene in Brasília on 1 February 2027, nearly a month after the inauguration of the winner of the 2026 presidential election.

In the 2026 elections, the Liberal Party won the plurality of the Chamber with 121 deputies, and the plurality of the Senate with 29 senators. (Note: As in Brazil the government is formed by a coalition, it is hard for a party to reach the majority of 257 deputies and/or 41 senators. Therefore, the majority party is the one with more members in each house.)

== Major events ==
- 1 February 2027: Congress scheduled to convene. Election for the directors' board of the Chamber of Deputies and Senate.

== Leadership ==
=== Federal Senate ===
- President of the Federal Senate: TBD
- Government Leader: TBD
- Majority Leader: TBD
- Opposition Leader: TBD
- Minority Leader: TBD
- Female Caucus Leader: TBD
- PL Leader: TBD
- UPB Leader: TBD
- PT Leader: TBD
- MDB Leader: TBD
- PSD Leader: TBD
- PSB Leader: TBD
- NOVO Leader: TBD
- PODE Leader: TBD
- PSDB Leader: TBD
- PDT Leader: TBD
- REDE Leader: TBD

=== Chamber of Deputies ===
- President of the Chamber of Deputies: TBD
- Government Leader: TBD
- Majority Leader: TBD
- Opposition Leader: TBD
- Minority Leader: TBD
- PL Leader: TBD
- FE Brasil Leader: TBD
- UPB Leader: TBD
- PSD Leader: TBD
- Republicanos Leader: TBD
- MDB Leader: TBD
- PODE Leader: TBD
- PSB Leader: TBD
- PSOL REDE Fed. Leader: TBD
- PSDB Leader: TBD
- NOVO Leader: TBD
- Solidary Renewal Fed. Leader: TBD
- PDT Leader: TBD
- Avante Leader: TBD
- MISSÃO Representative: TBD

== Members ==
=== Federal Senate ===
==== Acre ====
▌ Alan Rick (UNIÃO)
▌ Mara Rocha (Republicanos)
▌ Marcio Bittar (PL)

==== Alagoas ====
▌ Arthur Lira (PP)
▌ Marina Candia (PSDB)
▌ Renan Filho (MDB)

==== Amapá ====
▌ Davi Alcolumbre (UNIÃO)
▌ Lucas Barreto (PSD)
▌ Rayssa Furlan (PODE)

==== Amazonas ====
▌ Cheila Moreira (PT)
▌ Eduardo Braga (MDB)
▌ Plínio Valério (PSDB)

==== Bahia ====
▌ Jaques Wagner (PT)
▌ Otto Alencar (PSD)
▌ Rui Costa (PT)

==== Ceará ====
▌ Camilo Santana (PT)
▌ Cid Gomes (PSB)
▌ Luizianne Lins (REDE)

==== Espírito Santo ====
▌ Evair de Melo (Republicanos)
▌ Magno Malta (PL)
▌ Renato Casagrande (PSB)

==== Federal District ====
▌ Bia Kicis (PL)
▌ Damares Alves (Republicanos)
▌ Michelle Bolsonaro (PL)

==== Goiás ====
▌ Gracinha Caiado (UNIÃO)
▌ Gustavo Gayer (PL)
▌ Wilder Morais (PL)

==== Maranhão ====
▌ Ana Paula Lobato (PSB)
▌ André Fufuca (PP)
▌ Lahesio Bonfim (NOVO)

==== Mato Grosso ====
▌ Jayme Campos (UNIÃO)
▌ José Medeiros (PL)
▌ Mauro Mendes (UNIÃO)

==== Mato Grosso do Sul ====
▌ Reinaldo Azambuja (PL)
▌ Renan Contar (PL)
▌ Tereza Cristina (PP)

==== Minas Gerais ====
▌ Alex Diniz (PL)
▌ Domingos Sávio (PL)
▌ Marília Campos (PT)

==== Pará ====
▌ Beto Faro (PT)
▌ Chicão Melo (UNIÃO)
▌ Helder Barbalho (MDB)

==== Paraíba ====
▌ Efraim Filho (PL)
▌ João Azevêdo (PSB)
▌ Veneziano Vital do Rêgo (MDB)

==== Paraná ====
▌ Deltan Dallagnol (NOVO)
▌ Filipe Barros (PL)
▌ Luis Felipe Cunha (UNIÃO)

==== Pernambuco ====
▌ Humberto Costa (PT)
▌ Marília Arraes (PDT)
▌ Teresa Leitão (PT)

==== Piauí ====
▌ Júlio César (PSD)
▌ Jussara Lima (PSD)
▌ Marcelo Castro (MDB)

==== Rio de Janeiro ====
▌ Carlos Jordy (PL)
▌ Carlos Portinho (PL)
▌ Romário Faria (Independent)

==== Rio Grande do Norte ====
▌ Rogério Marinho (PL)
▌ Samanda Alves (PT)
▌ Styvenson Valentim (PODE)

==== Rio Grande do Sul ====
▌ Hamilton Mourão (Republicanos)
▌ Marcel van Hattem (NOVO)
▌ Ubiratan Sanderson (PL)

==== Rondônia ====
▌ Bruno Scheid (PL)
▌ Fernando Máximo (PL)
▌ Jaime Bagattoli (PL)

==== Roraima ====
▌ Antonio Nicoletti (PL)
▌ Hiran Gonçalves (PP)
▌ Teresa Surita (MDB)

==== Santa Catarina ====
▌ Carlos Bolsonaro (PL)
▌ Caroline de Toni (PL)
▌ Jorge Seif (PL)

==== São Paulo ====
▌ André do Prado (PL)
▌ Guilherme Derrite (PP)
▌ Marcos Pontes (PL)

==== Sergipe ====
▌ Alessandro Vieira (MDB)
▌ Laércio Oliveira (PP)
▌ Rogério Carvalho (PT)

==== Tocantins ====
▌ Alexandre Guimarães (MDB)
▌ Dorinha Rezende (UNIÃO)
▌ Eduardo Gomes (PL)

=== Chamber of Deputies ===
==== Acre ====
▌ Socorro Neri (PP)
▌ Fábio Rueda (UNIÃO)
▌ Coronel Ulysses (UNIÃO)
▌ Pedro Longo (MDB)
▌ Roberto Duarte (Republicanos)
▌ José Adriano (PP)
▌ Perpétua Almeida (PCdoB)

==== Alagoas ====
▌ Alvinho Lira (PP)
▌ Delegado Fabio Costa (PP)
▌ Luciano Amaral (PSD)
▌ Rafael Brito (MDB)
▌ Isnaldo Bulhões (MDB)
▌ Daniel Barbosa (PP)
▌ Marx Beltrão (UNIÃO)
▌ Júlia Nunes (PSD)
▌ Gilvan Barros (PSDB)

==== Amapá ====
▌ Felipe Pinto (UNIÃO)
▌ Josenildo Abrantes (PDT)
▌ Aline Gurgel (UNIÃO)
▌ Marcio Serrão (UNIÃO)
▌ Vinícius Gurgel (PL)
▌ Dorinaldo Malafaia (PDT)
▌ Professora Marcivânia (PCdoB)
▌ Erica Aymoré (PODE)

==== Amazonas ====
▌ Sargento Salazar (PL)
▌ Sidney Leite (PSD)
▌ Adail Filho (MDB)
▌ Fausto Jr. (UNIÃO)
▌ Amom Mandel (Republicanos)
▌ Saullo Vianna (MDB)
▌ Joana Darc (UNIÃO)
▌ Alfredo Nascimento (PL)

==== Bahia ====
▌ Isidório de Santana (Avante)
▌ Antonio Brito (PSD)
▌ Neto Carletto (Avante)
▌ Daniel Alencar (PSD)
▌ Lucas Reis (PT)
▌ Sandro Filho (PP)
▌ Ivoneide Caetano (PT)
▌ Raissa Soares (PL)
▌ Roberta Roma (PL)
▌ Gabriel Nunes (PSD)
▌ Jorge Solla (PT)
▌ Valmir Assunção (PT)
▌ Sergio Brito (PSD)
▌ Ricardo Maia (MDB)
▌ Diego Coronel (Republicanos)
▌ Carlos Muniz (PSDB)
▌ Afonso Florence (PT)
▌ Elmar Nascimento (UNIÃO)
▌ Olivia Santana (PCdoB)
▌ Dal Barreto (UNIÃO)
▌ Adolfo Viana (PSDB)
▌ Daniel Almeida (PCdoB)
▌ Alice Portugal (PCdoB)
▌ Benedito Lemos Filho (UNIÃO)
▌ Cláudio Cajado (PP)
▌ Leur Lomanto Júnior (UNIÃO)
▌ Maria Marighella (PT)
▌ Joseildo Ramos (PT)
▌ João Bacelar (PL)
▌ Paulo Azi (UNIÃO)
▌ Capitão Alden (PL)
▌ Manuel Rocha (UNIÃO)
▌ Leo Prates (Republicanos)
▌ Raimundo Costa (PSD)
▌ Mário Negromonte Jr. (PSB)
▌ Márcio Marinho (Republicanos)
▌ Charles Fernandez (PSD)
▌ Elmo Vaz (Avante)
▌ Félix Mendonça Júnior (PDT)

==== Ceará ====
▌ André Fernandes (PL)
▌ Tainah Marinho (PSB)
▌ Yury do Paredão (MDB)
▌ Giordanna Mano (PRD)
▌ Domingos Neto (PSD)
▌ Robério Monteiro (PSB)
▌ Moses Rodrigues (UNIÃO)
▌ Fernando Santana (PT)
▌ Idilvan Alencar (PSB)
▌ Acilon Gonçalves (PSB)
▌ Matheus Noronha (PL)
▌ Fernanda Pessoa (PSD)
▌ Célio Studart (PSD)
▌ Danilo Forte (PP)
▌ Raimundo Martins (PT)
▌ Erika Amorim (Republicanos)
▌ AJ Albuquerque (PP)
▌ Nenen Coelho (MDB)
▌ Luisa Cela (PT)
▌ Jaziel Pereira (PL)
▌ Emanuel Acrizio (Solidariedade)
▌ Carmelo Neto (PL)

==== Espírito Santo ====
▌ Lucas Polese (PL)
▌ Jack Rocha (PT)
▌ Bruno Resende (UNIÃO)
▌ Gilson Daniel (PODE)
▌ Da Vitória (PP)
▌ Marcelo Santos (UNIÃO)
▌ João Coser (PT)
▌ Emanuela Pedroso (PSB)
▌ Alexandre Ramalho (Republicanos)
▌ Lucas Casagrande (PL)

==== Federal District ====
▌ Fábio Felix (PSOL)
▌ Rafael Prudente (MDB)
▌ Alberto Fraga (PL)
▌ Thiago Manzoni (PL)
▌ Julio Cesar Ribeiro (Republicanos)
▌ Izalci Lucas (PL)
▌ Agnelo Queiroz (PT)
▌ Reginaldo Veras (PV)

==== Goiás ====
▌ Bruno Peixoto (UNIÃO)
▌ Adriana Accorsi (PT)
▌ Fred Rodrigues (PL)
▌ Flávia Morais (MDB)
▌ Magda Mofatto (PL)
▌ Lucas do Vale (PSD)
▌ Adriano do Baldy (PP)
▌ Daniel Agrobom (PSD)
▌ José Nelto (UNIÃO)
▌ Lucas Calil (PRD)
▌ Célio Silveira (MDB)
▌ Major Vitor Hugo (PL)
▌ Rubens Otoni (PT)
▌ Glauskston Rios (PODE)
▌ Marussa Boldrin (Republicanos)
▌ Silvye Alves (UNIÃO)
▌ Fábio Sousa (PL)

==== Maranhão ====
▌ Pedro Lucas Fernandes (UNIÃO)
▌ Iracema Vale (MDB)
▌ Vinícius Ferro (MDB)
▌ Fabiana Vilar (PL)
▌ Aldir Júnior (PL)
▌ Amanda Gentil (PP)
▌ Larissa Torres (MDB)
▌ Erlanio Xavier (PDT)
▌ Juscelino Filho (PSDB)
▌ Hildo Rocha (MDB)
▌ Mariana Carvalho (PL)
▌ Junior Lourenço (MDB)
▌ Marreca Filho (PRD)
▌ Rubens Pereira Júnior (PT)
▌ Josivaldo JP (UNIÃO)
▌ Aluísio Mendes (Republicanos)
▌ Dr. Orlando (PL)
▌ Márcio Jerry (PCdoB)

==== Mato Grosso ====
▌ Coronel Fernanda (PL)
▌ Rosa Neide (PT)
▌ Fábio Garcia (UNIÃO)
▌ Coronel Assis (PL)
▌ Virginia Mendes (UNIÃO)
▌ Juarez Costa (Republicanos)
▌ Thiago Boava (PL)
▌ César Roveri (PODE)

==== Mato Grosso do Sul ====
▌ Camila Jara (PT)
▌ Marcos Pollon (PL)
▌ Rose Modesto (UNIÃO)
▌ Mara Caseiro (PL)
▌ Rodolfo Nogueira (PL)
▌ Beto Pereira (Republicanos)
▌ Isa Marcondes (Republicanos)
▌ Dagoberto Nogueira (PP)

==== Minas Gerais ====
▌ Nikolas Ferreira (PL)
▌ Ana Elisa (PT)
▌ Duda Salabert (PSOL)
▌ Reginaldo Lopes (PT)
▌ Rogério Correia (PT)
▌ Pinheirinho (PP)
▌ Zé Vitor (PL)
▌ Ana Pimentel (PT)
▌ Gleide Andrade (PT)
▌ Weliton Prado (PSD)
▌ Paulo Guedes (PT)
▌ Gleidson Azevedo (Republicanos)
▌ Pedro Rousseff (PT)
▌ Bruno Farias (Republicanos)
▌ Miguel Ângelo (PT)
▌ Diego Andrade (PSD)
▌ Dandara Tonantzin (PT)
▌ Lohanna França (PV)
▌ Rodrigo de Castro (UNIÃO)
▌ Delegado Marcelo Freitas (UNIÃO)
▌ Fred Costa (PRD)
▌ Bella Gonçalves (PT)
▌ Gilberto Abramo (Republicanos)
▌ Emidinho Madeira (PL)
▌ Newton Cardoso Jr. (MDB)
▌ Dimas Fabiano (PP)
▌ Padre João (PT)
▌ Luis Tibé (Avante)
▌ Rafael Simões (UNIÃO)
▌ Samuel Viana (UNIÃO)
▌ Eros Biondini (PL)
▌ Vinicius Diniz (PL)
▌ Leonardo Monteiro (PT)
▌ André Janones (REDE)
▌ Nely Aquino (PODE)
▌ Igor Santos (PL)
▌ Paulo Abi-Ackel (PSDB)
▌ Marcos Vinicius Bizarro (PL)
▌ Greyce Elias (PL)
▌ Lafayette de Andrada (PL)
▌ Dr. Frederico (PL)
▌ Cristiano Caporezzo (PL)
▌ Rosangela Reis (PL)
▌ Marcelo Álvaro Antônio (PL)
▌ Duarte Júnior (PSB)
▌ Fabio Ramalho (PL)
▌ Thiago Ganem (PL)
▌ Delegada Ione (PL)
▌ Rodrigo Tavares (PL)
▌ Lincoln Portela (PL)
▌ Gonzaga Ribeiro (PL)
▌ Cabo Junio Amaral (PL)
▌ Carlos Alberto de Mello (PL)

==== Pará ====
▌ Lenildo Sertão (PL)
▌ Jader Barbalho Filho (MDB)
▌ Alessandra Haber (PODE)
▌ Júnior Ferrari (PSD)
▌ Renilce Nicodemos (MDB)
▌ Dilvanda Faro (PT)
▌ José Priante (MDB)
▌ Andréia Siqueira (PSB)
▌ Joaquim Passarinho (PL)
▌ Lu Ogawa (PP)
▌ Adriano Coelho (MDB)
▌ Antonio Leocádio (MDB)
▌ Cassio Andrade (MDB)
▌ Airton Faleiro (PT)
▌ Rogerio Barra (PL)
▌ Raimundo Santos (PSD)
▌ Bob Fllay (PODE)

==== Paraíba ====
▌ Cabo Gilberto Silva (PL)
▌ Aguinaldo Ribeiro (PP)
▌ Ricardo Coutinho (PT)
▌ Murilo Galdino (Republicanos)
▌ Hugo Motta (Republicanos)
▌ Wilson Santiago (Republicanos)
▌ Ruy Carneiro (PODE)
▌ Gervásio Maia (PCdoB)
▌ Wellington Roberto (PSD)
▌ Damião Feliciano (UNIÃO)
▌ George Morais (PL)
▌ Pollyanna Dutra (PP)

==== Paraná ====
▌ Jeffrey Chiquini (NOVO)
▌ Guilherme Kilter (NOVO)
▌ Gilson Fahur (PL)
▌ Ana Júlia (PT)
▌ Beto Preto (PSD)
▌ Zeca Dirceu (PT)
▌ Rosangela Moro (PL)
▌ Aliel Machado (PV)
▌ Renato Freitas (PT)
▌ Matheus Laiola (UNIÃO)
▌ Pedro Lupion (Republicanos)
▌ Felipe Francischini (PODE)
▌ Carol Dartora (PT)
▌ Leonaldo Paranhos (PSD)
▌ Ricardo Barros (PP)
▌ Leandre dal Ponte (PSD)
▌ Paulo Litro (UNIÃO)
▌ Toninho Wandscheer (PP)
▌ Da Costa (PODE)
▌ Tião Medeiros (PP)
▌ Marcelo Belinati (PP)
▌ Arilson Chiorato (PT)
▌ Nelsi Conguetto (PL)
▌ Sergio Souza (MDB)
▌ Henrique Mecabô (NOVO)
▌ Luiz Goulart (PSD)
▌ Newton Bonin (Republicanos)
▌ Fernando Francischini (PL)
▌ Ricardo Arruda (PL)
▌ Paulo Martins (NOVO)

==== Pernambuco ====
▌ Pedro Campos (PSB)
▌ Jones Manoel (PSOL)
▌ Anderson Ferreira (PL)
▌ Marcelo Gouveia (PODE)
▌ Juliana de Chaparral (UNIÃO)
▌ Silvio Costa Filho (Republicanos)
▌ Gilson Machado (PODE)
▌ Felipe Carreras (PSB)
▌ Lula da Fonte (PP)
▌ Rosa Amorim (PT)
▌ Carlos Veras (PT)
▌ Fernando Coelho Filho (UNIÃO)
▌ Gabriel Porto (PSB)
▌ Fernando Monteiro (PSD)
▌ Eduardo Moura (NOVO)
▌ Clarissa Tércio (PP)
▌ Iza Arruda (MDB)
▌ Eliane Soares (PSB)
▌ Guilherme Uchoa Junior (PSD)
▌ Waldemar Oliveira (Avante)
▌ Augusto Coutinho (Republicanos)
▌ Clodoaldo Magalhães (PV)
▌ Thiago Medina (PL)
▌ Liana Cirne (PT)
▌ Ricardo Teobaldo (PODE)

==== Piauí ====
▌ Georgiano Neto (PSD)
▌ Charles Pessoa (PV)
▌ Castro Neto (MDB)
▌ José Santana (PT)
▌ Francisco Costa (PT)
▌ Jadyel Alencar (Republicanos)
▌ Júlio Arcoverde (PP)
▌ Marcos Aurélio Sampaio (MDB)
▌ Flávio Nogueira (PT)
▌ Wilson Martins (PSD)

==== Rio de Janeiro ====
▌ Dr. Luizinho (PP)
▌ Rick Azevedo (PSOL)
▌ Lindbergh Farias (PT)
▌ Luciano Vieira (PSDB)
▌ Altineu Côrtes (PL)
▌ Marcelo Freixo (PT)
▌ Sóstenes Cavalcante (PL)
▌ Antônio Rueda (UNIÃO)
▌ Anielle Franco (PT)
▌ Eduardo Pazuello (PL)
▌ Gutemberg Reis (MDB)
▌ Soraya Santos (PL)
▌ Áureo Ribeiro (Solidariedade)
▌ Felipe Curi (PP)
▌ Talíria Petrone (PSOL)
▌ Manoela Peres (PL)
▌ Dani Cunha (PL)
▌ Daniel Soranz (PSD)
▌ Julia de Castro (PL)
▌ Elias Jabbour (PCdoB)
▌ Diogo Balieiro Diniz (PL)
▌ Renan Ferreirinha (PSD)
▌ Rafael Satiê (PL)
▌ Glauber Braga (PSOL)
▌ Renato Cozzolino (PP)
▌ Fabiano Horta (PT)
▌ Chris Tonietto (PL)
▌ Filippe Poubel (PL)
▌ Wladimir Garotinho (PL)
▌ Douglas Gomes (PL)
▌ Luiz Lima (NOVO)
▌ Henrique Vieira (PSOL)
▌ Márcio Rezende (PSD)
▌ Jandira Feghali (PCdoB)
▌ Leniel Borel (PP)
▌ Luis Carlos Gomes (Republicanos)
▌ Marcos Tavares (PDT)
▌ Diego Quaquá (PT)
▌ Marcio Ribeiro (PSD)
▌ Thiago Gagliasso (PL)
▌ Nísia Trindade (PT)
▌ Jorge Miranda (PL)
▌ Juninho do Pneu (PSDB)
▌ Marcelo Queiroz (PSDB)
▌ Bebeto (PP)
▌ Talita Galhardo (PSDB)

==== Rio Grande do Norte ====
▌ Natália Bonavides (PT)
▌ Nina Souza (PL)
▌ Benes Leocádio (UNIÃO)
▌ Evandro Gonçalves (PL)
▌ Eliéser Girão (PL)
▌ Bernardo Amorim (PV)
▌ João Maia (PP)
▌ Thabatta Pimenta (PV)

==== Rio Grande do Sul ====
▌ Mauricio Marcon (PL)
▌ Fernanda Melchionna (PSOL)
▌ Giovani Cherini (PL)
▌ Rony Gabriel (PODE)
▌ Alceu Moreira (MDB)
▌ Maria do Rosário (PT)
▌ Afonso Hamm (PP)
▌ Any Ortiz (PP)
▌ Pedro Westphalen
▌ Covatti Filho (PP)
▌ Osmar Terra (PL)
▌ Daiana Santos (PCdoB)
▌ Bohn Gass (PT)
▌ Danrlei Hinterholz (PSD)
▌ Marcelo Moraes (PL)
▌ Denise Pessôa (PT)
▌ Lucas Redecker (PSD)
▌ Dionilso Marcon (PT)
▌ Jessé Sangalli (PL)
▌ Gustavo Victorino (Republicanos)
▌ Valdeci Oliveira (PT)
▌ Diogo Siqueira (PL)
▌ Felipe Camozzato (NOVO)
▌ Pompeo de Mattos (PDT)
▌ Carlos Gomes (Republicanos)
▌ Juvir Costella (MDB)
▌ Bibo Nunes (PL)
▌ Marciano Perondi (PL)
▌ Luiz Carlos Busato (UNIÃO)
▌ Sergio Zambiasi (PODE)
▌ Vilmar Zanchin (MDB)

==== Rondônia ====
▌ Lucio Mosquini (PL)
▌ João Chrisóstomo (PL)
▌ Thiago Flores (UNIÃO)
▌ Joliane Furia (PSD)
▌ Sofia Andrade (PL)
▌ Cristiane Lopes (PODE)
▌ Maurício Carvalho (UNIÃO)
▌ Jaime Gazola (PODE)

==== Roraima ====
▌ Marcos Jorge (Republicanos)
▌ Ítalo Otávio (Republicanos)
▌ Rodrigo Mesquita (PODE)
▌ Daniel Trindade (PL)
▌ Duda Ramos (PODE)
▌ Zé Haroldo Cathedral (UNIÃO)
▌ Joner Chagas (Republicanos)
▌ Defensor Stélio Dener (UNIÃO)

==== Santa Catarina ====
▌ Julia Zanatta (PL)
▌ Ana Paula Lima (PT)
▌ Pedro Uczai (PT)
▌ Jair Renan Bolsonaro (PL)
▌ Carlos Henrique Lima (PL)
▌ Pezenti (MDB)
▌ Gilson Marques (NOVO)
▌ Giovana Mondardo (PCdoB)
▌ Julio Garcia (PSD)
▌ Daniela Reinehr (PL)
▌ Zé Milton (PP)
▌ Ana Paula da Silva (PODE)
▌ Zé Trovão (PL)
▌ Ricardo Guidi (PL)
▌ Daniel Freitas (PL)
▌ Geovania de Sá (Republicanos)

==== São Paulo ====
▌ Lucas Pavanato (PL)
▌ Erika Hilton (PSOL)
▌ Sâmia Bomfim (PSOL)
▌ Kim Kataguiri (MISSÃO)
▌ Tabata Amaral (PSB)
▌ Renato Bolsonaro (PL)
▌ Israel Nantes (PP)
▌ Mario Palumbo (PODE)
▌ Guilherme Cortez (PSOL)
▌ Mauricio Neves (PP)
▌ Marcio Alvino (PL)
▌ Luciene Cavalcante (PSOL)
▌ Ana Carolina Oliveira (PODE)
▌ Baleia Rossi (MDB)
▌ Luna Zarattini (PT)
▌ Marina Helena (NOVO)
▌ Bruno Lima (PODE)
▌ Rosana Valle (PL)
▌ Renata Abreu (PODE)
▌ Marcos Pereira (Republicanos)
▌ Luiz Philippe of Orléans-Braganza (PL)
▌ Guilherme Piai (Republicanos)
▌ Igor Soares (PSD)
▌ Paulo Alexandre Barbosa (PSD)
▌ Felipe Becari (PODE)
▌ Thiago Surfista (PL)
▌ Alencar Santana (PT)
▌ Augusto Rosa (PL)
▌ Jilmar Tatto (PT)
▌ Celso Russomanno (Republicanos)
▌ Thiago dos Reis (PT)
▌ Paulo Serra (PSDB)
▌ Sidney Cruz (MDB)
▌ João Cury (MDB)
▌ Luiz Fernando Machado (PL)
▌ Arlindo Chinaglia (PT)
▌ Marco Feliciano (PL)
▌ Ney Santos (Republicanos)
▌ Carlos Zarattini (PT)
▌ Edinho Silva (PT)
▌ Nilto Tatto (PT)
▌ Natália Boulos (PSOL)
▌ Kiko Celeguim (PT)
▌ Luiz Carlos Motta (PL)
▌ Juliana Cardoso (PT)
▌ João Paulo Cunha (PT)
▌ Rodrigo Gambale (PODE)
▌ Sandra Tadeu (PL)
▌ Enrico Misasi (MDB)
▌ Paulo Telhada (PP)
▌ Paulo Freire (PL)
▌ Marcos Neves (PSD)
▌ Jonas Donizette (PSB)
▌ Miguel Lombardi (PL)
▌ Saulo Pedroso (PSD)
▌ Altair Moraes (Republicanos)
▌ Jefferson Campos (PL)
▌ Carlos Sampaio (PSD)
▌ Maria Rosas (Republicanos)
▌ Mario Frias (PL)
▌ Paulo Bilynskyj (PL)
▌ Carlos Bezerra Jr. (PSD)
▌ Sirlange Manga (UNIÃO)
▌ Milton Leite Filho (UNIÃO)
▌ Adriana Ventura (NOVO)
▌ Eduardo Cury (PL)
▌ Wesley Cezar (PL)
▌ Gil Diniz (PL)
▌ Edinho Araujo (PRD)
▌ Sônia Guajajara (PSOL)

==== Sergipe ====
▌ Yandra Moura (UNIÃO)
▌ Claudio Mitidieri (PSB)
▌ João Daniel (PT)
▌ Fábio Reis (PSD)
▌ Delegada Katarina (PSD)
▌ Ícaro de Valmir (Republicanos)
▌ Samuel Barreto (UNIÃO)
▌ Gustinho Ribeiro (PP)

==== Tocantins ====
▌ Janad Valcari (PP)
▌ Jair Farias (UNIÃO)
▌ Lucas Campelo (Republicanos)
▌ Ricardo Ayres (Republicanos)
▌ Filipe Martins (PL)
▌ Sandoval Cardoso (PODE)
▌ Iratã Abreu (PSDB)

== Committees ==
=== Federal Senate ===
Committee	Chair
Agriculture and Agrarian Reform	TBA
Communication and Digital Law	TBA
Constitution, Justice and Citizenship	TBA
Defense of Democracy	TBA
Economic Affairs	TBA
Education and Culture	TBA
Environment	TBA
Ethics and Parliamentary Decorum	TBA
External Relations and National Defence	TBA
Human Rights and Participative Legislation	TBA
Infrastructure Services	TBA
Public Security	TBA
Regional Development and Tourism	TBA
Science, Technology, Innovation and Computing	TBA
Social Affairs	TBA
Sports	TBA
Transparency, Governance, Inspection and Control and Consumer Defence	TBA

=== Chamber of Deputies ===
Committee	Chair
Administration and Public Service	TBA
Agriculture, Livestock, Supply and Rural Development	TBA
Amazon and Originary and Traditional People	TBA
Communication	TBA
Consumer Defence	TBA
Constitution, Justice and Citizenship	TBA
Culture	TBA
Defense of Elderly People Rights	TBA
Defense of People with Disabilities Rights	TBA
Defense of Women Rights	TBA
Economic Development	TBA
Education	TBA
Environment and Sustainable Development	TBA
Ethics and Parliamentary Decorum	TBA
Finances and Taxation	TBA
Financial Oversight and Control	TBA
Foreign Affairs and National Defence	TBA
Health	TBA
Human Rights, Minorities and Racial Equality	TBA
Industry, Trade and Services	TBA
Labour	TBA
Mines and Energy	TBA
National Integration and Regional Development	TBA
Participative Legislation	TBA
Public Security and Fight Against Organized Crime	TBA
Roads and Transports	TBA
Science, Technology and Innovation	TBA
Social Security, Social Assistance, Childhood, Adolescence and Family	TBA
Sports	TBA
Tourism	TBA
Urban Development	TBA
