= Charles Pessoa =

Brazilian politician (born 1983)

- Pessoa in 2026

Member-elect of the Chamber of Deputies
- Assuming office 1 February 2027
- Constituency: Piauí

Personal details
- Born: Charles de Holanda Pessoa; 31 August 1983 (age 43) Rio Grande do Piauí, Piauí, Brazil
- Party: PV
- Profession: Police officer
- Website: despertadordocharles.com.br

Charles de Holanda Pessoa (born 31 August 1983) is a Brazilian politician who was elected member of the Chamber of Deputies in 2026. From 2023 to 2025, he served as coordinator of the Department for Combating Organized Crime of Piauí. From 2019 to 2022, he served as director of intelligence of the Secretariat of Justice of Piauí.
