= Ivoneide Caetano =

Brazilian politician (born 1972)

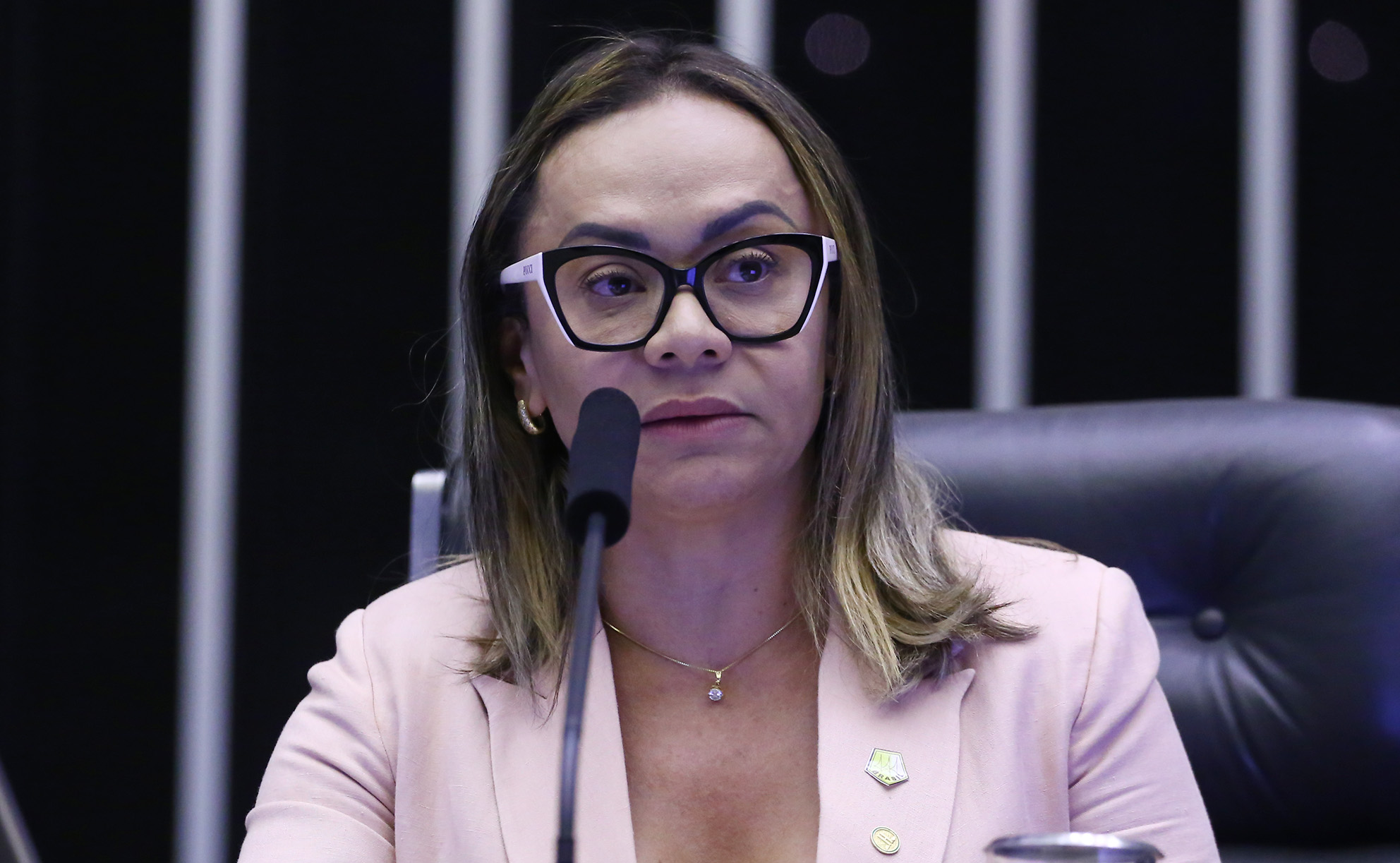
- Caetano in 2023

Member of the Chamber of Deputies
- Incumbent
- Assumed office 1 February 2023
- Constituency: Bahia

Personal details
- Born: Ivoneide Souza; 10 September 1972 (age 54) Biritinga, Bahia, Brazil
- Party: PT (since 2020)
- Spouse: Luiz Caetano (m. 2019)

Ivoneide Souza Caetano (née Souza; born 10 September 1972) is a Brazilian politician serving as a member of the Chamber of Deputies since 2023. She has been married to Luiz Caetano since 2019.
