= Miguel Ângelo (politician) =

Brazilian politician (born 1991)

Member of the Chamber of Deputies
- Incumbent
- Assumed office 1 February 2023
- Constituency: Minas Gerais

Personal details
- Born: 11 October 1991 (age 34)
- Party: Workers' Party (since 2008)
- Parent: Durval Ângelo (father)

Miguel Ângelo Monteiro Andrade (born 11 October 1991) is a Brazilian politician serving as a member of the Chamber of Deputies since 2023. He is the son of Durval Ângelo.
