= Dal Barreto =

Brazilian politician (born 1979)

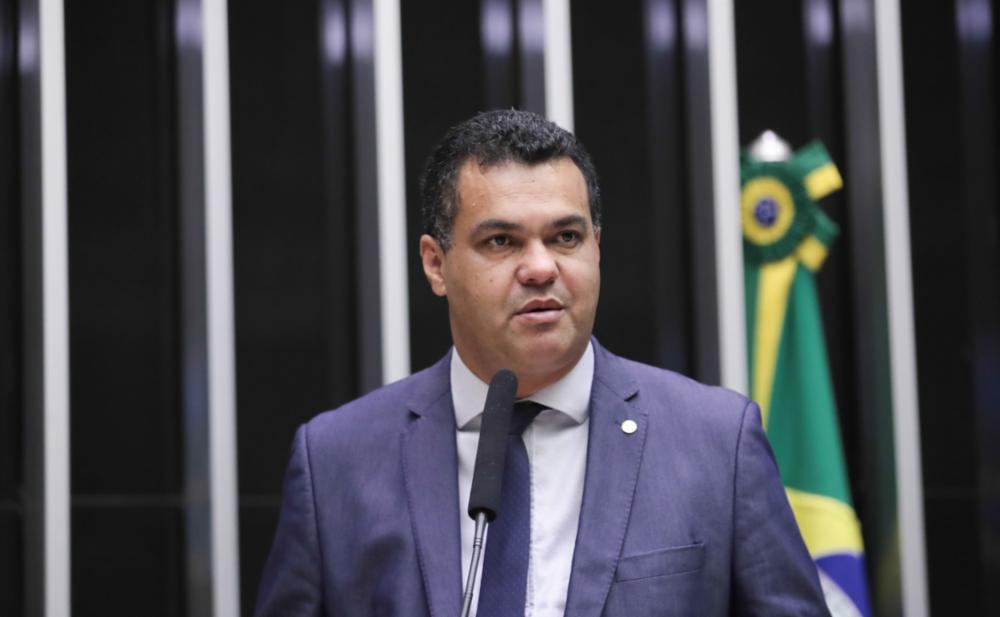
- Barreto in 2023

Member of the Chamber of Deputies
- Incumbent
- Assumed office 1 February 2023
- Constituency: Bahia

Member of the Legislative Assembly of Bahia
- In office 1 February 2019 – 1 February 2023
- Constituency: At-large

Personal details
- Born: Adalberto Rosa Barreto; 16 March 1979 (age 47) Amargosa, Bahia, Brazil
- Party: UNIÃO (since 2022)
- Other political affiliations: DEM (2008–2018); PCdoB (2018–2019); PP (2019–2022)

Adalberto Rosa Barreto (born 16 March 1979), better known as Dal Barreto, is a Brazilian politician serving as a member of the Chamber of Deputies since 2023. From 2019 to 2023, he was a member of the Legislative Assembly of Bahia.
