= Biritinga =

Municipality of Bahia, Brazil

- Municipality of Bahia, Brazil
- Flag Coat of arms
- Etymology: Indigenous name that means "white wild cane"
- Location of Biritinga in Bahia

- Location within Brazil Location within South America
- Coordinates: 11°37′22″S 38°48′27″W
- Country: Brazil
- Region: Northeast
- State: Bahia
- Founded: 23 April 1962

Government
  - Mayor: Gilmário Souza de Oliveira (PSB) (2025-2028)
  - Vice Mayor: Daniel Cerqueira do Nascimento (PSB) (2025-2028)

Area
  - Total: 553.762 km^{2} (213.809 sq mi)
- Elevation: 249 m (817 ft)

Population (2022)
  - Total: 15,146
  - Density: 27.35/km^{2} (70.8/sq mi)
- Demonym: Biritinguense (Brazilian Portuguese)
- Time zone: UTC-03:00 (Brasília Time)
- Postal code: 48780-000
- HDI (2010): 0.538 – low
- Website: biritinga.ba.gov.br

Biritinga is a municipality in Bahia, Brazil. As of 2020, it had a population of 15,984 and a land area of 214 square miles (553 km^{2}).

== See also ==
- List of municipalities in Bahia
