= Samuel Viana =

Brazilian politician (born 1992)

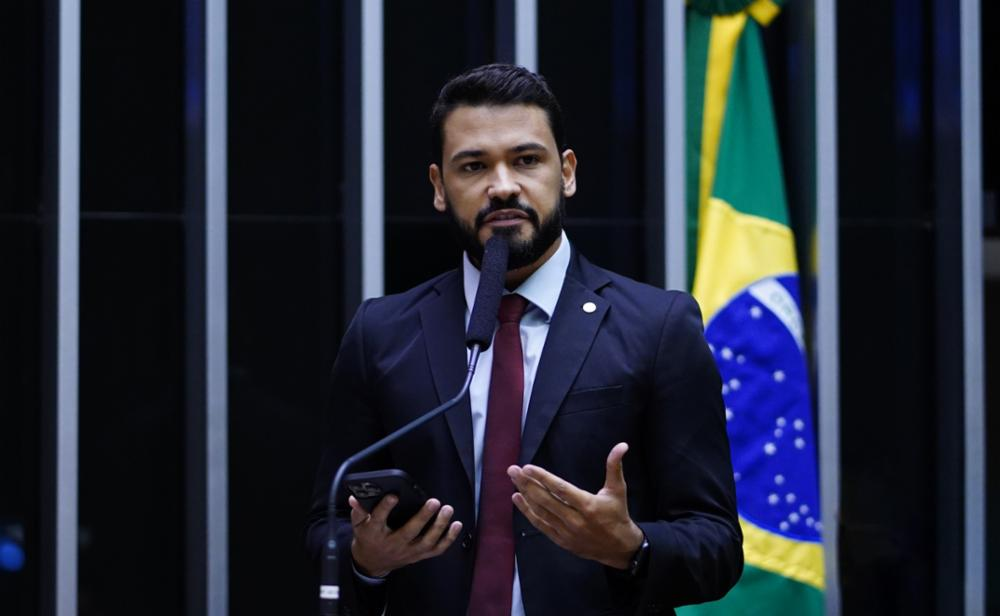
- Viana in 2023

Member of the Chamber of Deputies
- Incumbent
- Assumed office 1 February 2023
- Constituency: Minas Gerais

Personal details
- Born: 5 March 1992 (age 34)
- Party: Republicans (since 2024)
- Parent: Carlos Viana (father)

Samuel José Rodrigues de Viana (born 5 March 1992) is a Brazilian politician serving as a member of the Chamber of Deputies since 2023. He is the son of Carlos Viana.
