= Daniel Trindade =

Brazilian politician (born 1983)

Member-elect of the Chamber of Deputies
- Assuming office 1 February 2027
- Constituency: Roraima

Personal details
- Born: Daniel Pedreiro da Trindade; 25 December 1983 (age 42) Monte Alegre, Pará, Brazil
- Party: PL
- Education: Federal University of Roraima
- Profession: Police officer

Daniel Pedreiro da Trindade (born 25 December 1983) is a Brazilian politician who was elected member of the Chamber of Deputies in 2026. He previously served as president of the Democratic Renewal Party in Roraima.
