= Juliana de Chaparral =

Brazilian politician (born 1983)

Member of the Chamber of Deputies
- Assuming office 1 February 2027
- Constituency: Pernambuco

Personal details
- Born: Juliana Barbosa da Silva Aguiar; 11 October 1983 (age 43) Orobó, Pernambuco, Brazil
- Party: UNIÃO
- Spouse: Cléber Chaparral (m. 2012)
- Profession: Teacher

Juliana Barbosa da Silva Aguiar (born 11 October 1983), better known as Juliana de Chaparral, is a Brazilian politician who was elected member of the Chamber of Deputies in 2026. From 2021 to 2026, she served as mayor of Casinhas. She has been married to Cléber Chaparral since 2012.
