= Manoela Peres =

Brazilian politician (born 1980)

Member-elect of the Chamber of Deputies
- Assuming office 1 February 2027
- Constituency: Rio de Janeiro

Personal details
- Born: Manoela Ramos de Souza Gomes Alves; 23 August 1980 (age 46) Araruama, Rio de Janeiro, Brazil
- Party: PL

Manoela Ramos de Souza Gomes Alves (born 23 August 1980), better known as Manoela Peres, is a Brazilian politician who was elected member of the Chamber of Deputies in 2026. From 2017 to 2024, she served as mayor of Saquarema.
