= Juninho do Pneu =

Brazilian politician (born 1976)

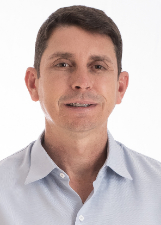

Member of the Chamber of Deputies
- Incumbent
- Assumed office 1 February 2019
- Constituency: Rio de Janeiro

State Secretary of Transports of Rio de Janeiro
- In office 20 June 2021 – 24 November 2021
- Governor: Cláudio Castro
- Preceded by: Delmo Pinho
- Succeeded by: André Luiz Nahass

Member of the Municipal Chamber of Nova Iguaçu
- In office 1 January 2013 – 1 February 2019
- Constituency: At-large

Personal details
- Born: Rogério Teixeira Júnior; 23 October 1976 (age 50) Nova Iguaçu, Rio de Janeiro, Brazil
- Party: PSDB (2026–present)
- Other political affiliations: PR (2011–2016); MDB (2016–2018); DEM (2018–2022); UNIÃO (2022–2026)

Rogério Teixeira Júnior, better known as Juninho do Pneu (born 23 October 1976), is a Brazilian politician serving as a member of the Chamber of Deputies since 2019. In 2021, he served as secretary of transport of Rio de Janeiro.
