= Bruno Resende =

Brazilian politician (born 1986)

Member-elect of the Chamber of Deputies
- Assuming office 1 February 2027
- Constituency: Espírito Santo

Member of the Legislative Assembly of Espírito Santo
- Incumbent
- Assumed office 1 February 2023
- Constituency: At-large

Personal details
- Born: Bruno da Costa Resende; 7 December 1986 (age 39) Cachoeiro de Itapemirim, Espírito Santo, Brazil
- Party: UNIÃO

Bruno da Costa Resende (born 7 December 1986) is a Brazilian politician who was elected member of the Chamber of Deputies in 2026. He has been a member of the Legislative Assembly of Espírito Santo since 2023.
