= Lucas do Vale =

Brazilian politician (born 1989)

Member of the Legislative Assembly of Goiás
- Incumbent
- Assumed office 1 February 2023

Personal details
- Born: 18 March 1989 (age 37)
- Party: Brazilian Democratic Movement (since 2022)

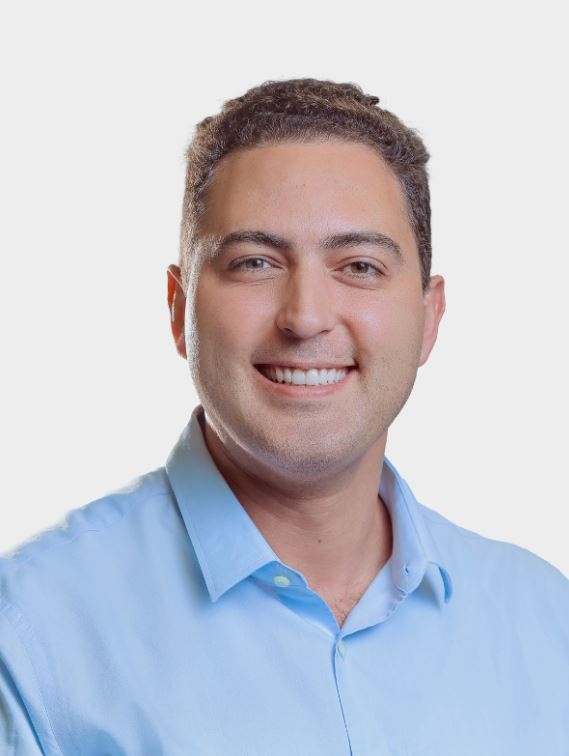
Lucas Martins do Vale

Lucas Martins do Vale (born 18 March 1989) is a Brazilian politician serving as a member of the Legislative Assembly of Goiás since 2023. He previously worked as a nephrologist for the Sistema Único de Saúde for 10 years.
