= Diogo Siqueira =

Brazilian politician (born 1979)

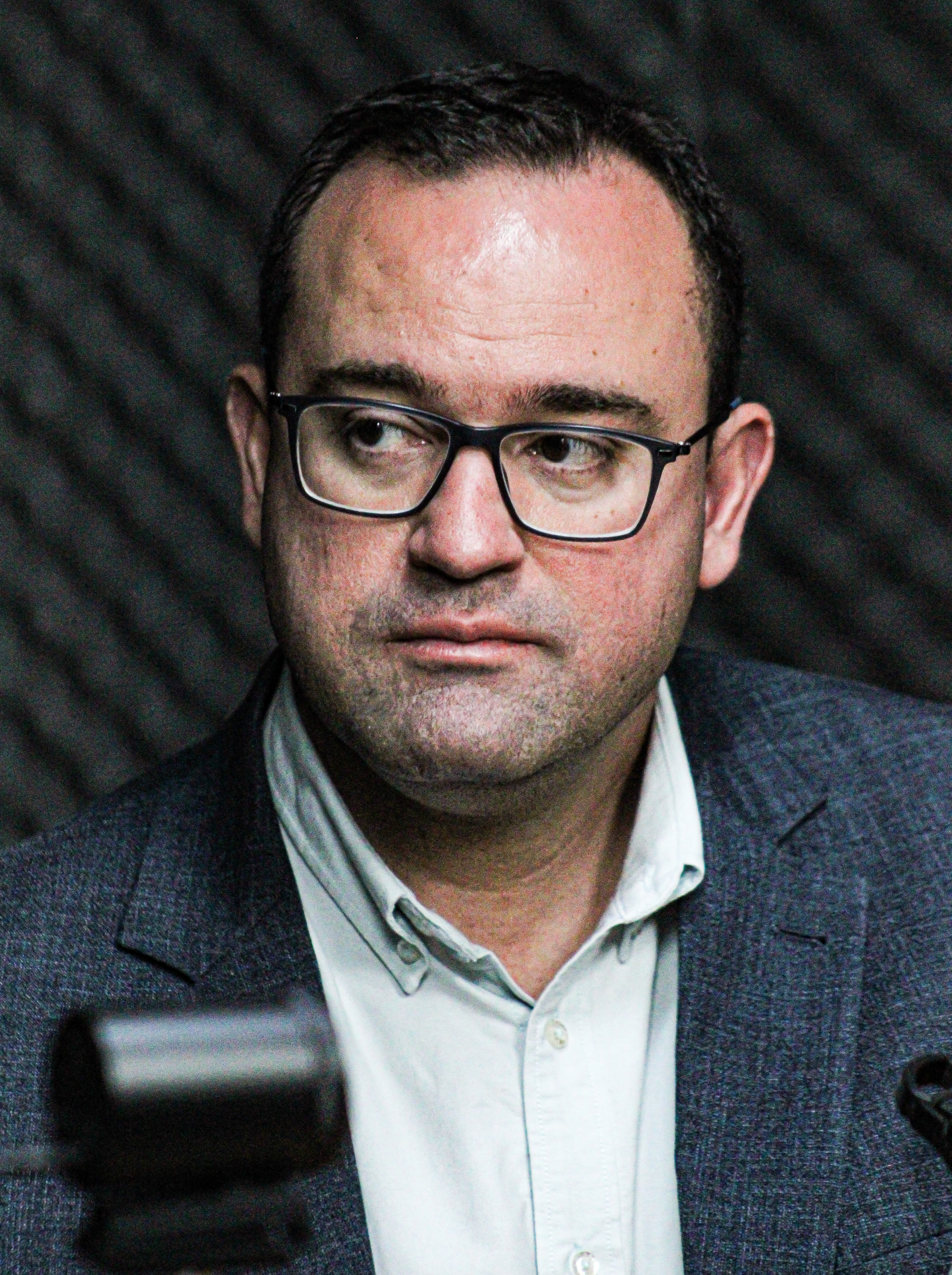
- Siqueira in 2024

Member-elect of the Chamber of Deputies
- Assuming office 1 February 2027
- Constituency: Rio Grande do Sul

Mayor of Bento Gonçalves
- In office 1 January 2021 – 30 March 2026
- Vice Mayor: Amarildo Lucatelli
- Preceded by: Guilherme Pasin
- Succeeded by: Amarildo Lucatelli

Personal details
- Born: Diogo Segabinazzi Siqueira; 29 August 1979 (age 47) Joaçaba, Santa Catarina, Brazil
- Party: PL (since 2026)
- Other political affiliations: PSDB (2008–2026)
- Profession: Odontologist

Diogo Segabinazzi Siqueira (born 29 August 1979) is a Brazilian politician who was elected member of the Chamber of Deputies in 2026. From 2021 to 2026, he served as mayor of Bento Gonçalves. From 2009 to 2016, he served as mayor of Santa Tereza.
