= Eduardo Moura =

Brazilian politician (born 1980)

Member of the Chamber of Deputies
- Incumbent
- Assumed office 1 February 2027
- Constituency: Pernambuco

Personal details
- Born: 30 March 1980 (age 46)
- Party: New Party

Eduardo Ramos de Moura (born 30 March 1980) is a Brazilian politician who was elected member of the Chamber of Deputies in 2026. He has been a member of the Municipal Chamber of Recife since 2025.
