= Vinicius Diniz =

Brazilian politician (born 1986)

Member-elect of the Chamber of Deputies
- Assuming office 1 February 2027
- Constituency: Minas Gerais

Personal details
- Born: Vinicius Abreu Diniz; 27 February 1986 (age 40) Governador Valadares, Minas Gerais, Brazil
- Party: PL

Vinicius Abreu Diniz (born 27 February 1986) is a Brazilian politician who was elected member of the Chamber of Deputies in 2026. He is the son of Hercílio Coelho Diniz and the nephew of Alex Diniz.
