= Lucas Reis (politician) =

Brazilian politician (born 1987)

Member-elect of the Chamber of Deputies
- Assuming office 1 February 2027
- Constituency: Bahia

Personal details
- Born: Lucas Araújo dos Reis; 6 August 1987 (age 39) Salvador, Bahia, Brazil
- Party: PT
- Other political affiliations: Lawyer

Lucas Araújo dos Reis (born 6 August 1987) is a Brazilian politician who was elected member of the Chamber of Deputies in 2026. From 2019 to 2026, he served as chief of staff to Jaques Wagner.
