= Jeffrey Chiquini =

Brazilian politician (born 1990)

Member-elect of the Chamber of Deputies
- Assuming office 1 February 2027
- Constituency: Paraná

Personal details
- Born: Jeffrey Chiquini da Costa; 15 February 1990 (age 36) Curitiba, Paraná, Brazil
- Party: NOVO
- Education: Faculdade Opet; Centro Universitário Curitiba
- Profession: Criminal lawyer

Jeffrey Chiquini da Costa (born 15 February 1990) is a Brazilian politician who was elected member of the Chamber of Deputies in 2026. He is a professor of criminal procedure law at the Escola da Magistratura do Paraná.
