= Julia de Castro =

Brazilian politician (born 2002)

Member-elect of the Chamber of Deputies
- Assuming office 1 February 2027
- Constituency: Rio de Janeiro

Personal details
- Born: Julia de Castro Placido; 28 February 2002 (age 24) São João de Meriti, Rio de Janeiro, Brazil
- Party: PL

Julia de Castro Placido (born 28 February 2002) is a Brazilian politician who was elected member of the Chamber of Deputies in 2026. She is the vice president of the youth wing of the Liberal Party.
