= Thiago Manzoni =

Brazilian politician (born 1984)

- Manzoni in 2023

Member-elect of the Chamber of Deputies
- Assuming office 1 February 2027
- Constituency: Federal District

Member of the Legislative Chamber of the Federal District
- Incumbent
- Assumed office 1 February 2023
- Constituency: At-large

Personal details
- Born: Thiago de Araújo Macieira Manzoni; 25 January 1984 (age 42) Campo Grande, Mato Grosso do Sul, Brazil
- Party: PL (since 2022)
- Profession: Lawyer

Thiago De Araújo Macieira Manzoni (born 25 January 1984) is a Brazilian politician who was elected member of the Chamber of Deputies in 2026. He has been a member of the Legislative Chamber of the Federal District since 2023.
