= Jadyel Alencar =

Brazilian politician (born 1987)

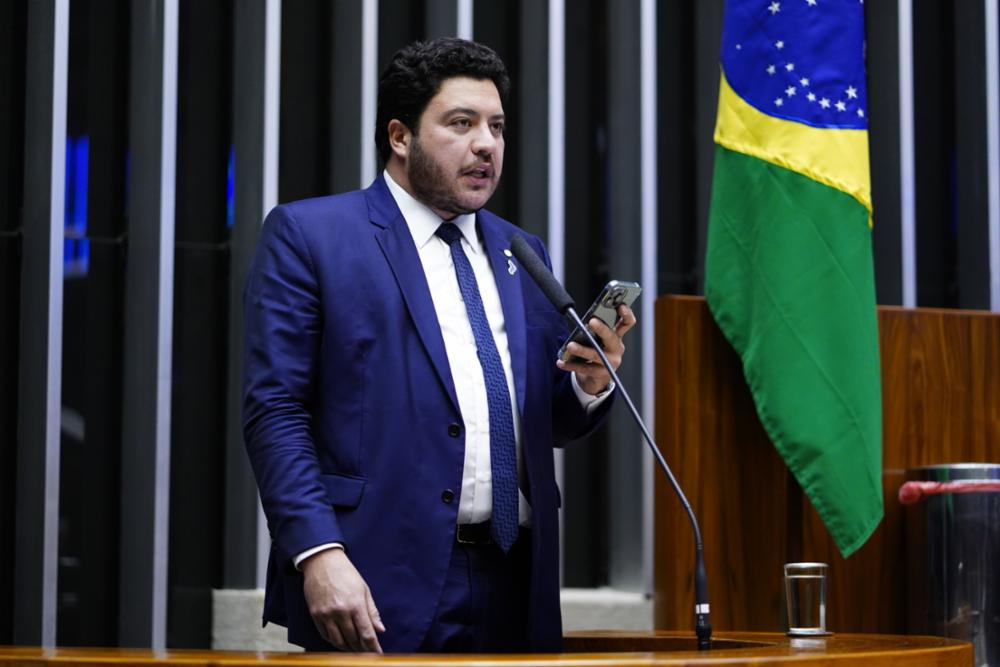
- Alencar in 2023

Member of the Chamber of Deputies
- Incumbent
- Assumed office 1 February 2023
- Constituency: Piauí

Personal details
- Born: Jadyel Silva Alencar; 23 July 1987 (age 39) Teresina, Piauí, Brazil
- Party: Republicanos (since 2024)
- Other political affiliations: PV (2022–2024)

Jadyel Silva Alencar (born 23 July 1987) is a Brazilian politician serving as a member of the Chamber of Deputies since 2023. He has been a member of the Republicans since 2024.
