= Ricardo Maia (politician) =

Brazilian politician (born 1975)

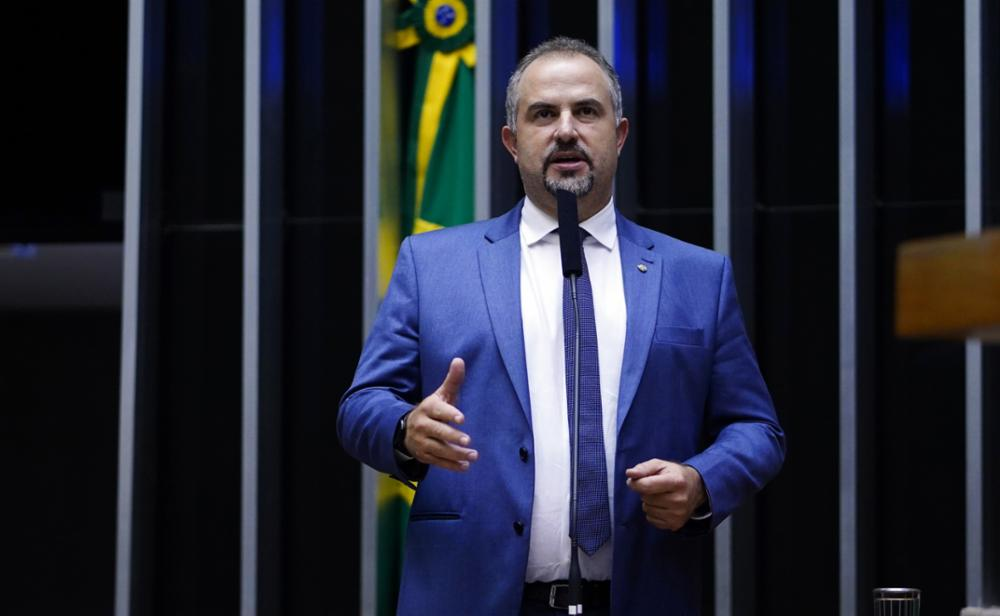
- Maia in 2023

Member of the Chamber of Deputies
- Incumbent
- Assumed office 1 February 2023
- Constituency: Bahia

Personal details
- Born: 26 August 1975 (age 51)
- Party: Brazilian Democratic Movement (since 2022)

Ricardo Maia Chaves de Souza (born 26 August 1975) is a Brazilian politician serving as a member of the Chamber of Deputies since 2023. From 2013 to 2020, he served as mayor of Ribeira do Pombal.
