= Giovana Mondardo =

Brazilian politician (born 1993)

- Mondardo in 2024

Member-elect of the Chamber of Deputies
- Assuming office 1 February 2027
- Constituency: Santa Catarina

Member of the Municipal Chamber of Criciúma
- Incumbent
- Assumed office 1 January 2021
- Constituency: At-large

Personal details
- Born: Giovana Vito Mondardo; 1 February 1993 (age 33) Criciúma, Santa Catarina, Brazil
- Party: PCdoB
- Other political affiliations: Dentist surgeon, teacher

Giovana Vito Mondardo (born 1 February 1993) is a Brazilian politician who was elected member of the Chamber of Deputies in 2026. She has been a municipal councillor of Criciúma since 2021.
