= Gilberto Abramo =

Brazilian politician (born 1966)

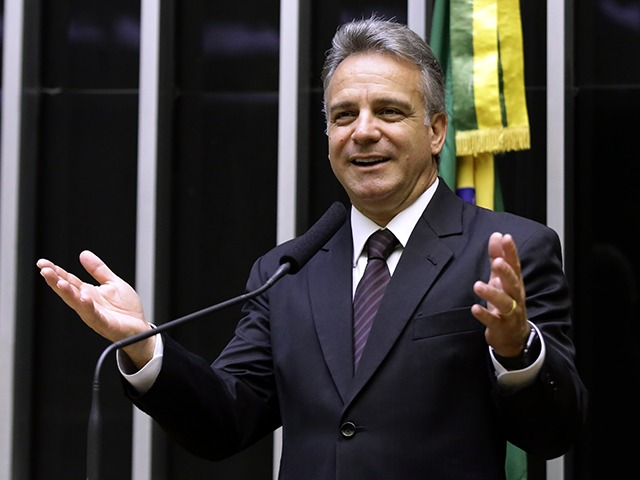
- Abramo in 2022

Member of the Chamber of Deputies
- Incumbent
- Assumed office 1 February 2019
- Constituency: Minas Gerais

Personal details
- Born: 6 August 1966 (age 60)
- Party: Republicans (since 2009)

Gilberto Aparecido Abramo (born 6 August 1966) is a Brazilian politician serving as a member of the Chamber of Deputies since 2019. From 2003 to 2019, he was a member of the Legislative Assembly of Minas Gerais.
