= Da Costa (politician) =

Brazilian politician (born 1990)

Member-elect of the Chamber of Deputies
- Assuming office 1 February 2027
- Constituency: Paraná

Member of the Municipal Chamber of Curitiba
- In office 1 January 2025 – 6 October 2026
- Constituency: At-large

Personal details
- Born: Gustavo Silveira da Costa; 24 January 1990 (age 36) Curitiba, Paraná, Brazil
- Party: PODE (since 2026)
- Other political affiliations: UNIÃO (2024–2026)

YouTube information
- Channel: Perdeu Piá
- Years active: 2020–present
- Genre: True crime
- Subscribers: 885 thousand
- Views: 257 million
- Last updated: 14 October 2026

Gustavo Silveira da Costa (born 24 January 1990), known mononymously as Da Costa, is a Brazilian politician and internet personality who was elected member of the Chamber of Deputies in 2026. From 2025 to 2026, he was a member of the Municipal Chamber of Curitiba.
