= Thiago Surfista =

Brazilian politician (born 1982)

- Surfista in 2025

Member-elect of the Chamber of Deputies
- Assuming office 1 February 2027
- Constituency: São Paulo

Vice Mayor of Guarulhos
- Incumbent
- Assumed office 1 January 2025
- Vice Mayor: Lucas Sanches
- Preceded by: Jesus Roque de Freitas

Member of Municipal Chamber of Guarulhos
- In office 1 January 2017 – 1 January 2025
- Constituency: At-large

Personal details
- Born: Thiago de Azevedo Lopes Fonseca; 22 July 1982 (age 44) São Paulo, Brazil
- Party: PL (2025–present)
- Other political affiliations: PRTB (until 2020); PSD (2020–2024); NOVO (2024–2025)

Thiago de Azevedo Lopes Fonseca (born 22 July 1982), better known as Thiago Surfista, is a Brazilian politician who was elected member of the Chamber of Deputies in 2026. He has served as deputy mayor of Guarulhos since 2025.
