= Sargento Salazar =

Brazilian politician (born 1983)

Member-elect of the Chamber of Deputies
- Assuming office 1 February 2027
- Constituency: Amazonas

Member of the Municipal Chamber of Manaus
- Incumbent
- Assumed office 1 January 2025
- Constituency: At-large

Personal details
- Born: Alexandre da Silva Salazar; 21 May 1983 (age 43) Manaus, Amazonas, Brazil
- Party: PL
- Profession: Police officer

Military service
- Allegiance: Military Police of Amazonas State
- Rank: Sergeant

Alexandre da Silva Salazar (born 21 May 1983), better known as Sargento Salazar, is a Brazilian politician who was elected member of the Chamber of Deputies in 2026. He has been a municipal councillor of Manaus since 2025.
