= Sandro Filho =

Brazilian politician (born 2005)

- Sandro in 2020

Member-elect of the Chamber of Deputies
- Assuming office 1 February 2027
- Constituency: Bahia

Member of the Municipal Chamber of Salvador
- Incumbent
- Assumed office 1 January 2025
- Constituency: At-large

Personal details
- Born: Sandro Alex dos Santos Silva Filho; 6 August 2005 (age 21) Salvador, Bahia, Brazil
- Party: PP

Sandro Alex dos Santos Silva Filho (born 6 August 2005) is a Brazilian politician who was elected member of the Chamber of Deputies in 2026. He has been a municipal councillor of Salvador since 2025.
