= Ricardo Ayres =

Brazilian politician (born 1979)

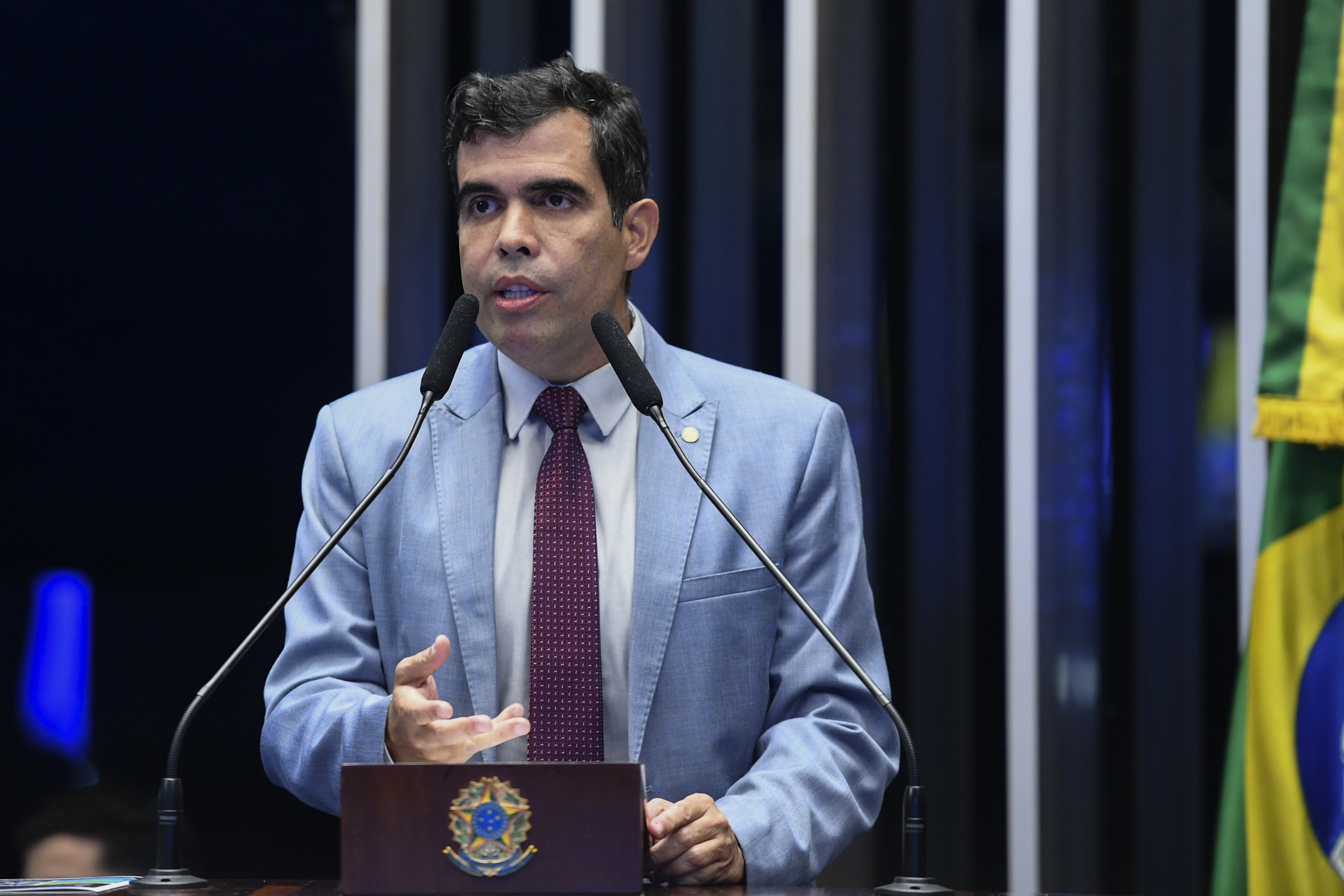
- Ayres in 2025

Member of the Chamber of Deputies
- Incumbent
- Assumed office 1 February 2023
- Constituency: Tocantins

Member of the Legislative Assembly of Tocantins
- In office 1 February 2015 – 1 February 2023
- Constituency: At-large

Personal details
- Born: Ricardo Ayres de Carvalho; 17 January 1979 (age 47) Goiânia, Goiás, Brazil
- Party: Republicanos (2022–present)
- Other political affiliations: PT (2003–2009); PMDB (2009–2013); PSB (2013–2022)

Ricardo Ayres de Carvalho (born 17 January 1979) is a Brazilian politician serving as a member of the Chamber of Deputies since 2023. From 2015 to 2022, he was a member of the Legislative Assembly of Tocantins.
