= Marcelo Gouveia =

Brazilian politician (born 1985)

Member-elect of the Chamber of Deputies
- Assuming office 1 February 2027
- Constituency: Pernambuco

Personal details
- Born: Marcello Fuchs Campos Gouveia; 28 October 1985 (age 41) Recife, Pernambuco, Brazil
- Party: PODE
- Education: University of Pernambuco
- Profession: Civil engineer

Marcello Fuchs Campos Gouveia (born 28 October 1985) is a Brazilian politician who was elected member of the Chamber of Deputies in 2026. He has served as chairman of Podemos in Pernambuco since 2023. From 2017 to 2024, he served as mayor of Paudalho.
