= Pinheirinho =

Brazilian politician (born 1991)

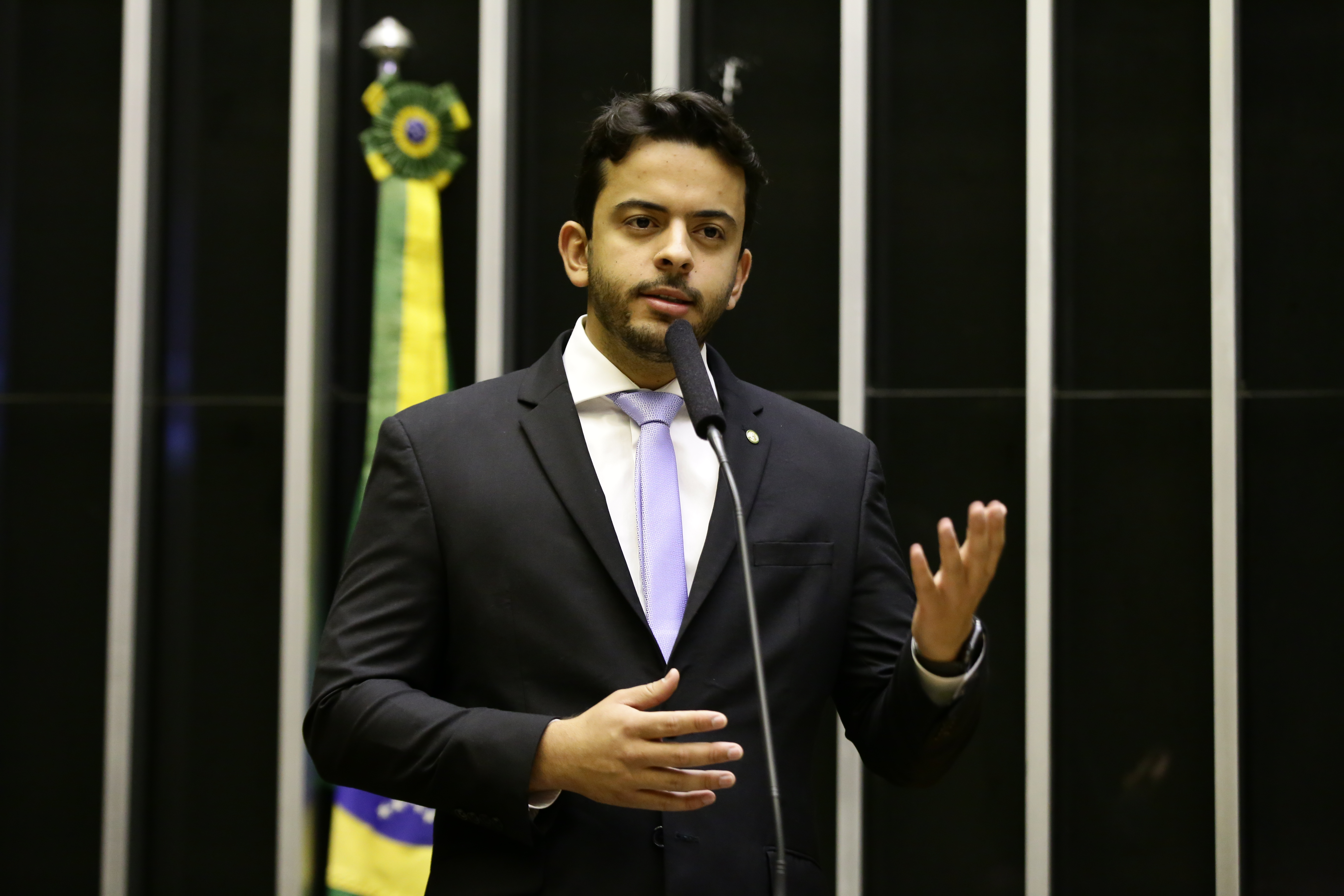
- Pinheirinho in 2019

Member of the Chamber of Deputies
- Incumbent
- Assumed office 1 February 2019
- Constituency: Minas Gerais

Personal details
- Born: 30 May 1991 (age 35)
- Party: Progressistas (since 2009)
- Parent: Toninho Pinheiro (father)

Antônio Pinheiro Neto (born 30 May 1991), better known as Pinheirinho, is a Brazilian politician serving as a member of the Chamber of Deputies since 2019. From 2013 to 2016, he served as mayor of Ibirité.
