= Rodrigo Tavares (politician) =

Brazilian politician (born 1985)

Member-elect of the Chamber of Deputies
- Assuming office 1 February 2027
- Constituency: Minas Gerais

Personal details
- Born: Rodrigo Rodrigues Tavares; 10 December 1985 (age 40) Teófilo Otoni, Minas Gerais, Brazil
- Party: PL (since 2026)
- Education: Pontifical Catholic University of Minas Gerais
- Profession: Lawyer

Rodrigo Rodrigues Tavares (born 10 December 1985) is a Brazilian politician who was elected member of the Chamber of Deputies in 2026. From 2022 to 2025, he served as director-general of the Department of Highways of Minas Gerais. From 2025 to 2026, he served as president of Invest Minas.
