= Lucas Calil =

Brazilian politician (born 1988)

Member of the Legislative Assembly of Goiás
- Incumbent
- Assumed office 1 February 2015

Personal details
- Born: 28 March 1988 (age 38)
- Party: Brazilian Democratic Movement (since 2022)

Lucas Pinheiro Brandão Calil (born 28 March 1988) is a Brazilian politician serving as a member of the Legislative Assembly of Goiás since 2015. He has been a member of the Brazilian Democratic Movement since 2022.
