= Gabriel Porto =

Brazilian politician (born 1993)

Member-elect of the Chamber of Deputies
- Assuming office 1 February 2027
- Constituency: Pernambuco

Personal details
- Born: Gabriel Lopes Porto de Barros; 19 May 1993 (age 33) Recife, Pernambuco, Brazil
- Party: PSB (since 2026)
- Profession: Physician

Gabriel Lopes Porto de Barros (born 19 May 1993) is a Brazilian politician who was elected member of the Chamber of Deputies in 2026. He is the son of Álvaro Porto.
