= Marussa Boldrin =

Brazilian politician (born 1990)

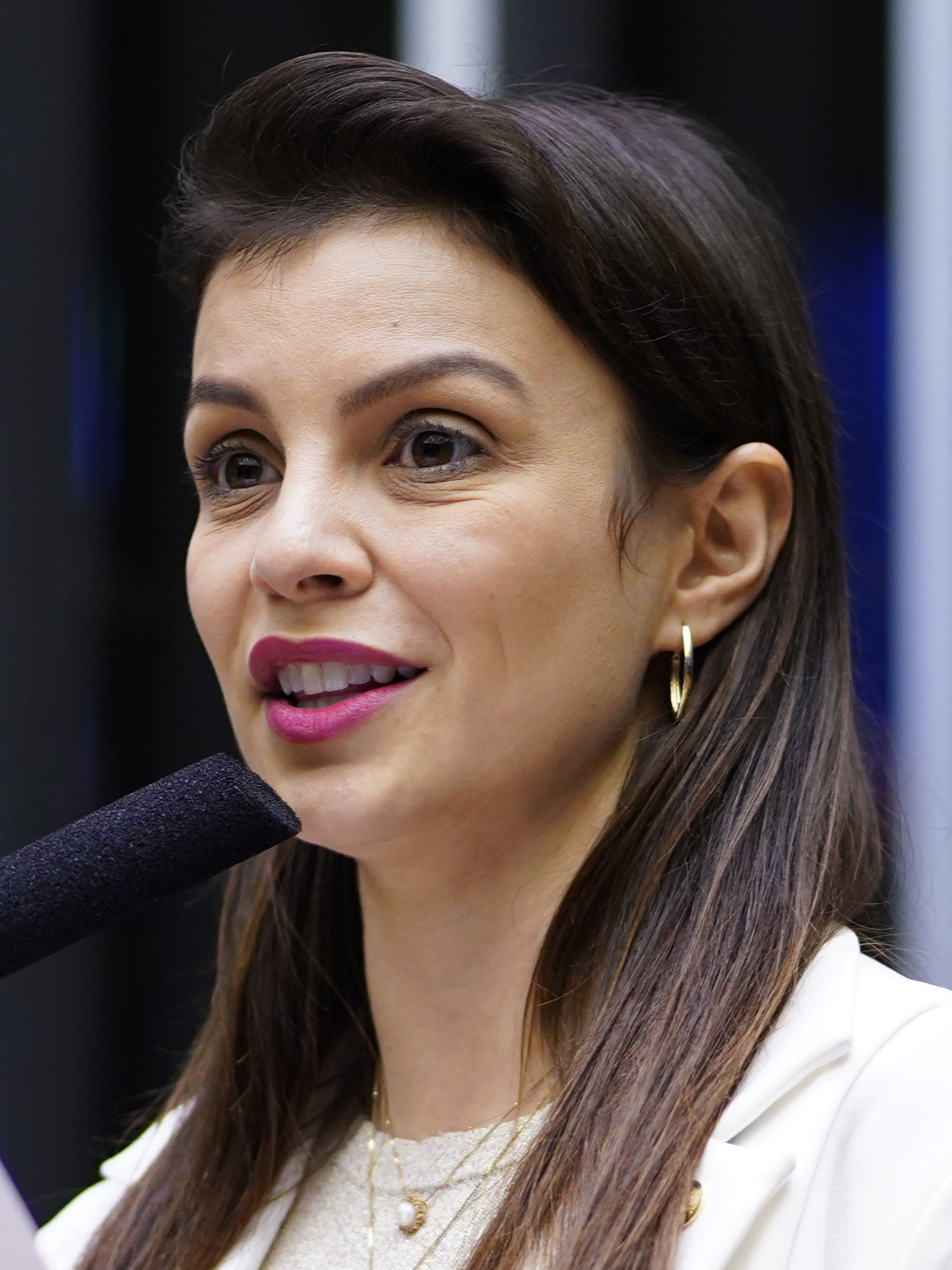
- Boldrin in 2023

Member of the Chamber of Deputies
- In office 1 February 2023 – December 2026
- Constituency: Goiás

Personal details
- Born: 25 June 1990 (age 36) Rio Verde
- Party: Republicans
- Other political affiliations: Brazilian Democratic Movement (2020-2026)

Marussa Cassia Favaro Boldrin (born 25 June 1990) is a Brazilian politician and an agronomist serving as a member of the Chamber of Deputies since 2023. From 2017 to 2023, she was a municipal councillor of Rio Verde.

She is affiliated with the Republican Party since March 2026.

She is an agronomist, graduated from the University of Rio Verde (UniRV). Postgraduate in Urban and Environmental Planning and Master in Agricultural Sciences and Agronomy from the Instituto Federal Goiano (IF Goiano).

She is a businesswoman, rural producer and owner of the company Solo Forte - Agricultural Analysis Laboratory.
