= Cristiano Caporezzo =

Brazilian politician (born 1988)

Member of the Legislative Assembly of Minas Gerais
- Incumbent
- Assumed office 1 February 2023

Personal details
- Born: 24 June 1988 (age 38)
- Party: Liberal Party (since 2022)

Cristiano Caporezzo Araújo Pires Ferreira (born 24 June 1988) is a Brazilian politician serving as a member of the Legislative Assembly of Minas Gerais since 2023. From 2021 to 2023, he was a city councillor of Uberlândia.
