= Gleide Andrade =

Brazilian politician (born 1971)

- Andrade in 2015

Member-elect of the Chamber of Deputies
- Assuming office 1 February 2027
- Constituency: Minas Gerais

Personal details
- Born: Gleide Andrade de Oliveira; 25 May 1971 (age 55) Divinópolis, Minas Gerais, Brazil
- Party: PT
- Education: Pontifical Catholic University of Minas Gerais
- Profession: Teacher

Gleide Andrade de Oliveira (born 25 May 1971) is a Brazilian politician who was elected member of the Chamber of Deputies in 2026. She has served as secretary of finance of the Workers' Party since 2019. From 2017 to 2019, she served as secretary of organization of the Workers' Party.
