= Reginaldo Veras =

Brazilian politician (born 1973)

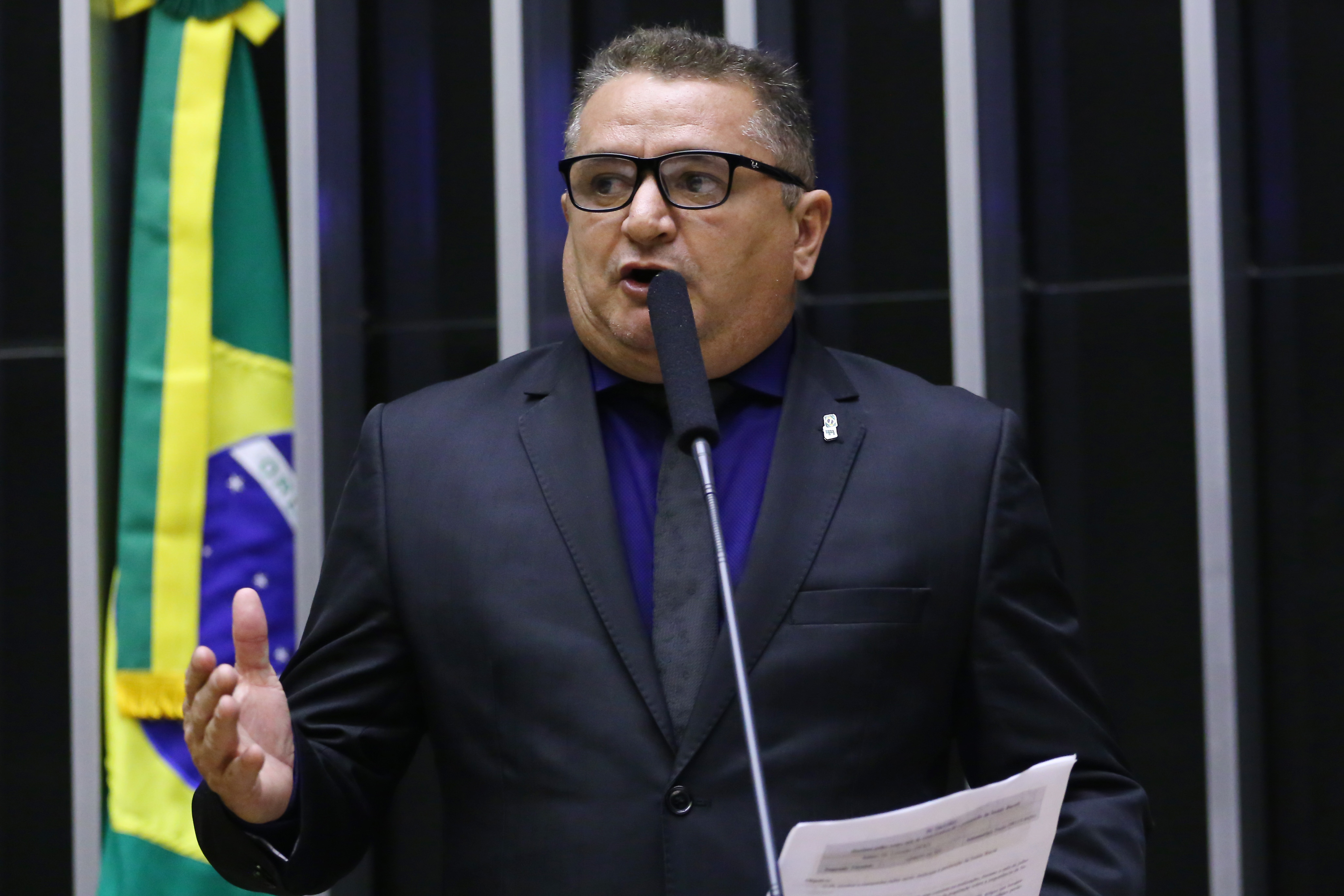
- Veras in 2023

Member of the Chamber of Deputies
- Incumbent
- Assumed office 1 February 2023
- Constituency: Federal District

Personal details
- Born: 2 January 1973 (age 53)
- Party: Green Party (since 2022)

Reginaldo Veras Coelho (born 2 January 1973) is a Brazilian politician serving as a member of the Chamber of Deputies since 2023. From 2015 to 2022, he was a member of the Legislative Chamber of the Federal District.
