= Lu Ogawa =

Brazilian politician (born 1980)

Member-elect of the Chamber of Deputies
- Assuming office 1 February 2027
- Constituency: Pará

Member of the Legislative Assembly of Pará
- Incumbent
- Assumed office 1 February 2023
- Constituency: At-large

Personal details
- Born: Jose Lucio Ogawa Rodrigues; 15 October 1980 (age 46) Barcarena, Pará, Brazil
- Party: PP

Jose Lucio Ogawa Rodrigues (born 15 October 1980), better known as Lu Ogawa, is a Brazilian politician who was elected member of the Chamber of Deputies in 2026. He has been a member of the Legislative Assembly of Pará since 2023.
