= Sofia Andrade (Brazilian politician) =

Brazilian politician (born 1990)

Member-elect of the Chamber of Deputies
- Assuming office 1 February 2027
- Constituency: Rondônia

Member of the Municipal Chamber of Porto Velho
- Incumbent
- Assumed office 1 January 2025
- Constituency: At-large

Personal details
- Born: Sofia Andrade de Aguiar Gomes; 11 September 1990 (age 36) Cacoal, Rondônia, Brazil
- Party: PL

Sofia Andrade de Aguiar Gomes (born 11 September 1990) is a Brazilian politician who was elected member of the Chamber of Deputies in 2026. She has been a municipal councillor of Porto Velho since 2025.
