= Lucas Casagrande =

Brazilian politician (born 1987)

Member-elect of the Chamber of Deputies
- Assuming office 1 February 2027
- Constituency: Espírito Santo

Member of the Municipal Chamber of Viana
- Incumbent
- Assumed office 1 January 2025
- Constituency: At-large

Personal details
- Born: Lucas Stein Casagrande; 16 February 1987 (age 39) Vila Velha, Espírito Santo, Brazil
- Party: PL

Lucas Stein Casagrande (born 16 February 1987) is a Brazilian politician who was elected member of the Chamber of Deputies in 2026. He has been a municipal councillor of Viana since 2025.
