= Thiago Ganem =

Brazilian politician (born 1990)

Member-elect of the Chamber of Deputies
- Assuming office 1 February 2027
- Constituency: Minas Gerais

Personal details
- Born: Thiago Martins Milhim; 12 July 1990 (age 36) São José do Rio Preto, São Paulo, Brazil
- Party: PL (since 2026)
- Education: Mackenzie Presbyterian University
- Profession: Lawyer

Thiago Martins Milhim (born 12 July 1990), better known as Thiago Ganem, is a Brazilian politician who was elected member of the Chamber of Deputies in 2026. From March to October 2023, he served as national secretary of amateur sports, education, leisure and social inclusion. In 2022, he served as secretary of sports of the state of São Paulo. From 2021 to 2022, he served as secretary of sports of the city of São Paulo.
