= Joana Darc =

Brazilian politician (born 1989)

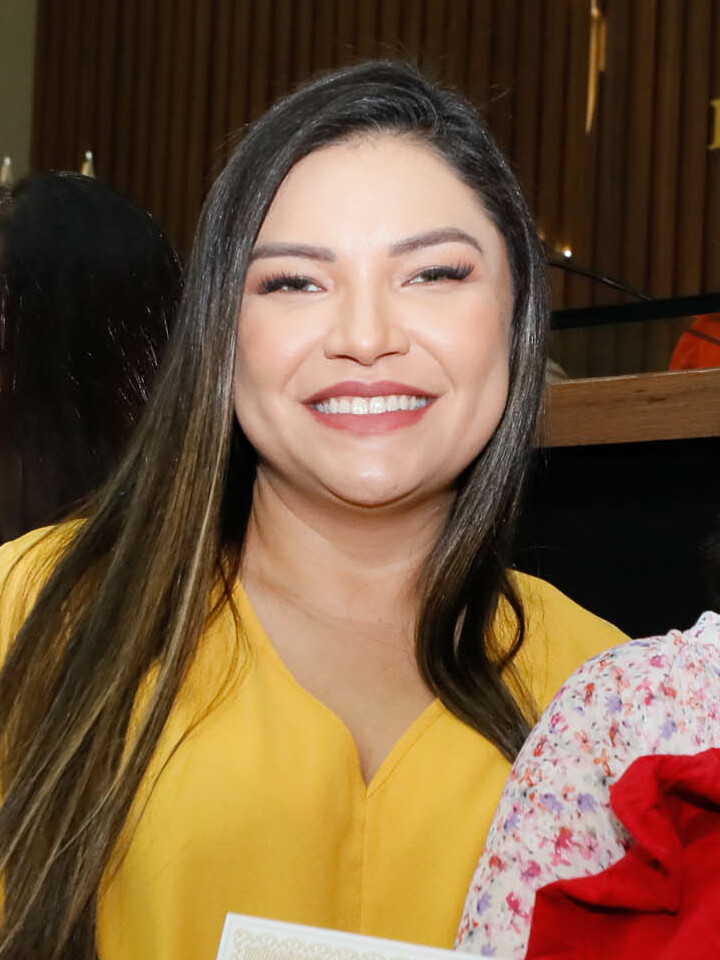
- Darc in 2023

Secretary of Animal Protection of Amazonas
- Incumbent
- Assumed office 1 October 2025

Personal details
- Born: 3 August 1989 (age 37)
- Party: Brazil Union (since 2022)

Joana Darc Cordeiro de Lima (born 3 August 1989) is a Brazilian politician serving as secretary of animal protection of Amazonas since 2025. She has been a member of the Legislative Assembly of Amazonas since 2019.
