= Lucas Campelo =

Brazilian politician (born 1992)

Member-elect of the Chamber of Deputies
- Assuming office 1 February 2027
- Constituency: Tocantins

Member of the Municipal Chamber of Araguaína
- Incumbent
- Assumed office 1 January 2025
- Constituency: At-large

Personal details
- Born: Lucas Gomes Pinheiro Neto; 13 January 1992 (age 34) Araguaína, Tocantins, Brazil
- Party: Republicanos (since 2026)

Lucas Gomes Pinheiro Neto (born 13 January 1992), better known as Lucas Campelo, is a Brazilian politician who was elected member of the Chamber of Deputies in 2026. He has been a municipal councillor of Araguaína since 2025.
