= Filipe Martins (politician) =

Brazilian politician (born 1984)

Member of the Chamber of Deputies
- Incumbent
- Assumed office 1 February 2023
- Constituency: Tocantins

Member of the Municipal Chamber of Palmas
- In office 1 January 2017 – 1 February 2023
- Constituency: At-large

Personal details
- Born: Filipe Martins dos Santos; 1 April 1984 (age 42) Goiânia, Goiás, Brazil
- Party: PL (2022–present)
- Other political affiliations: PSC (2013–2020); PSDB (2020–2022)

Filipe Martins dos Santos (born 1 April 1984) is a Brazilian politician serving as a member of the Chamber of Deputies since 2023. From 2017 to 2023, he was a municipal councillor of Palmas.
