= Dr. Frederico =

Brazilian politician (born 1977)

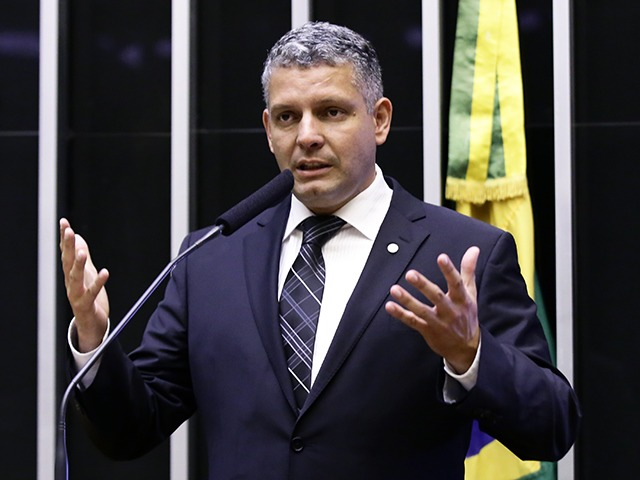
- Frederico in 2021

Member of the Chamber of Deputies
- Incumbent
- Assumed office 1 February 2019
- Constituency: Minas Gerais

Personal details
- Born: 24 March 1977 (age 49)
- Party: Democratic Renewal Party (since 2023)

Frederico de Castro Escaleira, better known as Dr. Frederico (born 24 March 1977), is a Brazilian politician serving as a member of the Chamber of Deputies since 2019. From 2021 to 2022, he served as chairman of the elderly rights committee.
