= Vinícius Ferro =

Brazilian politician (born 1987)

Member-elect of the Chamber of Deputies
- Assuming office 1 February 2027
- Constituency: Maranhão

Personal details
- Born: Vinicius Cesar Ferro Castro; 24 November 1987 (age 38) São Luís, Maranhão, Brazil
- Party: MDB

Vinícius Cesar Ferro Castro (born 24 November 1987) is a Brazilian politician who was elected member of the Chamber of Deputies in 2026. From 2023 to 2026, he served as secretary of planning and budget of Maranhão.
