= Defensor Stélio Dener =

Brazilian politician (born 1972)

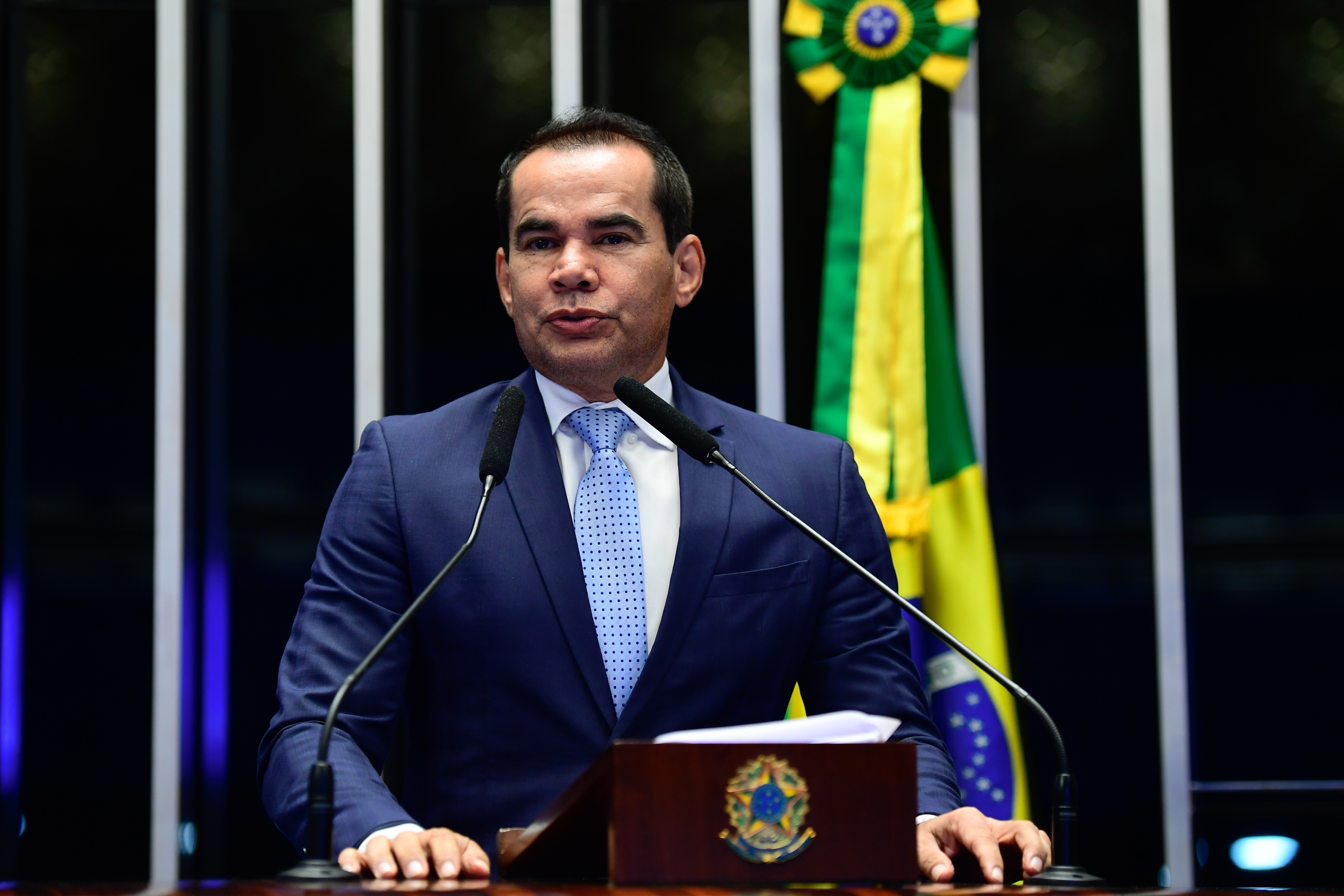
- Dener in 2025

Member of the Chamber of Deputies
- Incumbent
- Assumed office 1 February 2023
- Constituency: Roraima

Personal details
- Born: Stélio Dener de Souza Cruz; 16 November 1972 (age 53) Boa Vista, Roraima, Brazil
- Party: UNIÃO (2026–present)
- Other political affiliations: Republicanos (2022–2026)
- Profession: Public defender

Stélio Dener de Souza Cruz (born 16 November 1972), better known as Defensor Stélio Dener, is a Brazilian politician serving as a member of the Chamber of Deputies since 2023. He served as public defender-general of Roraima from 2011 to 2015 and from 2019 to 2021.
