= Manuel Rocha (politician) =

Brazilian politician (born 1983)

- Rocha in 2022

Member-elect of the Chamber of Deputies
- Assuming office 1 February 2027
- Constituency: Bahia

Member of the Legislative Assembly of Bahia
- Incumbent
- Assumed office 1 February 2023
- Constituency: At-large

Personal details
- Born: Manuel Azevedo Rocha; 27 December 1983 (age 42) Salvador, Bahia, Brazil
- Party: UNIÃO
- Profession: Lawyer

Manuel Azevedo Rocha (born 27 December 1983) is a Brazilian politician who was elected member of the Chamber of Deputies in 2026. He has been a member of the Legislative Assembly of Bahia since 2023. From 2013 to 2020, he served as mayor of Coribe. He is the son of José Rocha.
