= Matheus Noronha =

Brazilian politician (born 1998)

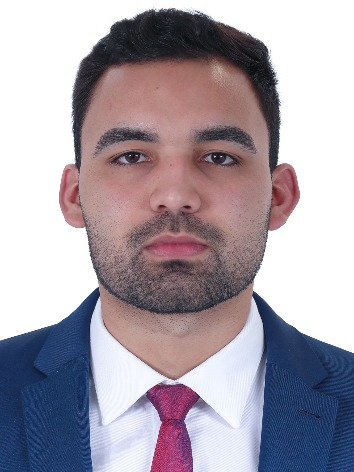
- Official portrait, 2023

Member of the Chamber of Deputies
- Incumbent
- Assumed office 1 February 2023
- Constituency: Ceará

Personal details
- Born: Matheus Soares Noronha; 10 September 1998 (age 28) Castanhal, Pará, Brazil
- Party: PL (since 2022)

Matheus Soares Noronha (born 10 September 1998) is a Brazilian politician serving as a member of the Chamber of Deputies since 2023. He is the son of Genecias Noronha and Aderlânia Noronha.
