= Júlio Arcoverde =

Brazilian politician (born 1966)

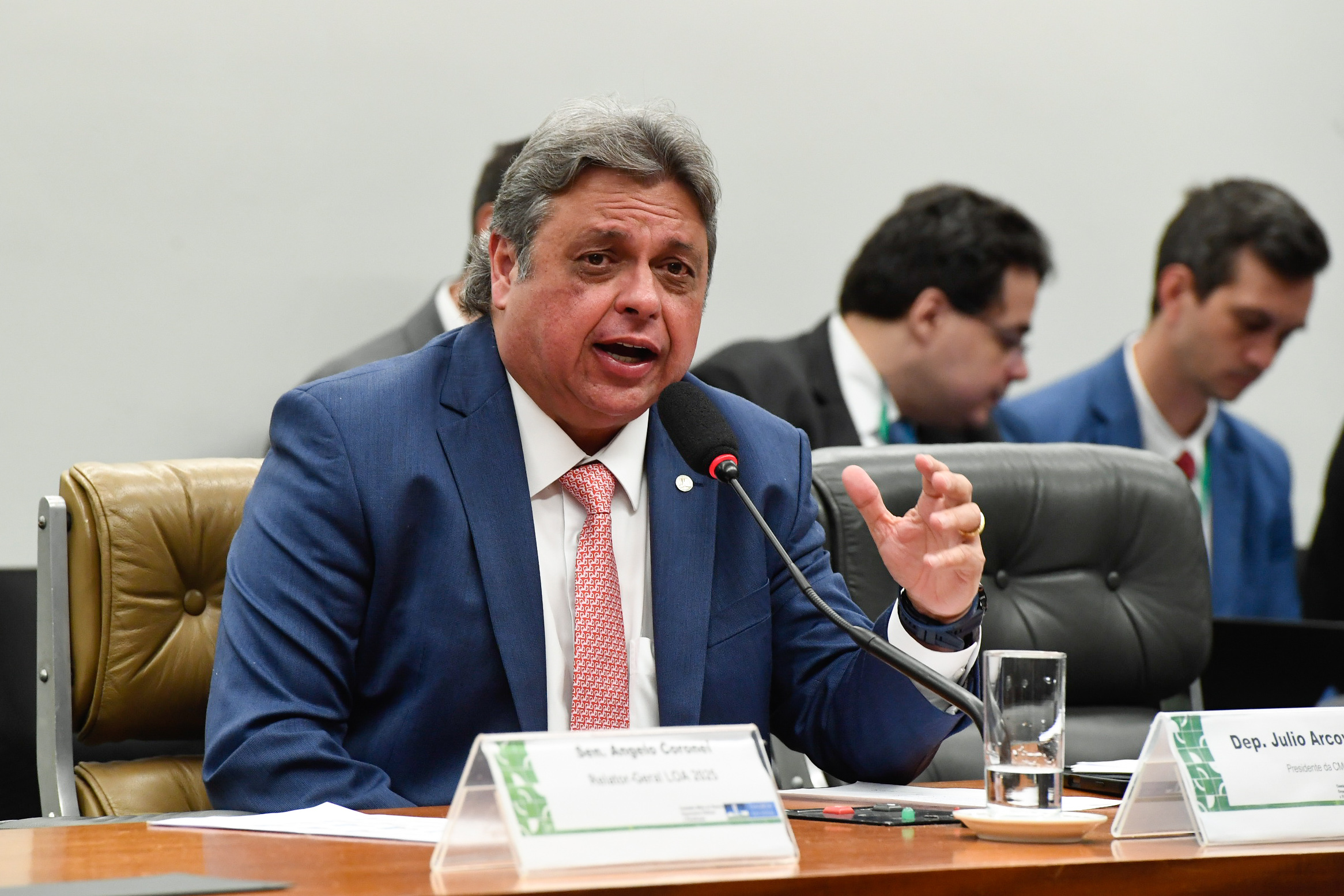
- Arcoverde in 2025

Member of the Chamber of Deputies
- Incumbent
- Assumed office 1 February 2023
- Constituency: Piauí

Member of the Legislative Assembly of Piauí
- In office 1 February 2019 – 1 February 2023
- Constituency: At-large

Personal details
- Born: Júlio Ferraz Arcoverde; 14 February 1966 (age 60) Teresina, Piauí, Brazil
- Party: PP (since 2004)
- Education: Universidade Gama Filho
- Profession: Lawyer

Júlio Ferraz Arcoverde (born 14 February 1966) is a Brazilian politician serving as a member of the Chamber of Deputies since 2023. From 2015 to 2022, he was a member of the Legislative Assembly of Piauí.
