= Delegada Ione =

Brazilian politician (born 1974)

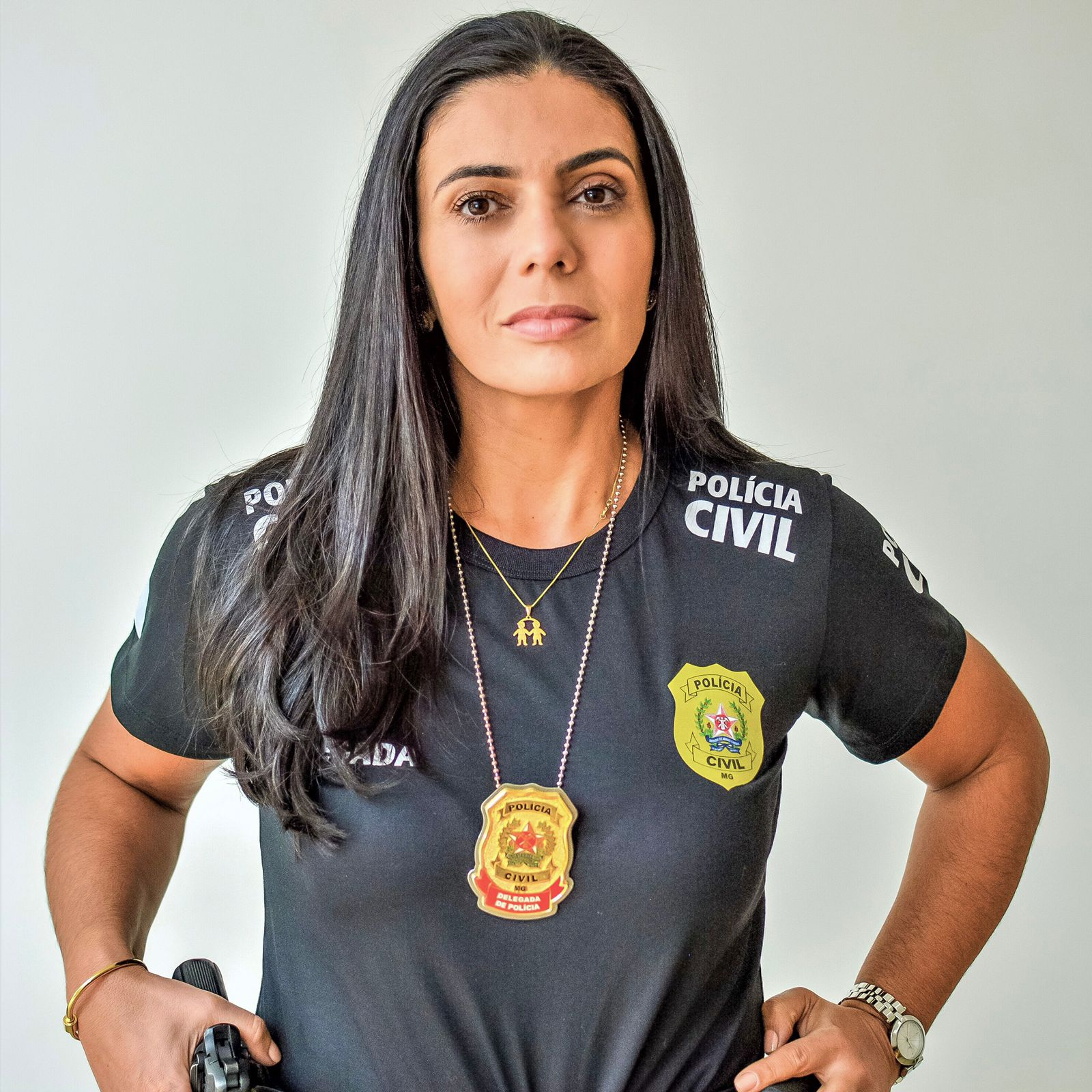
- Ione in 2022

Member of the Chamber of Deputies
- Incumbent
- Assumed office 1 February 2023
- Constituency: Minas Gerais

Personal details
- Born: 20 March 1974 (age 52)
- Party: Liberal Party (since 2026)

Ione Maria Moreira Dias Barbosa (born 20 March 1974), better known as Delegada Ione, is a Brazilian politician serving as a member of the Chamber of Deputies since 2023. She has served as chairwoman of the administration and public service committee since 2026.
