= Douglas Gomes =

Brazilian politician (born 1990)

- Gomes in 2024

Member-elect of the Chamber of Deputies
- Assuming office 1 February 2027
- Constituency: Rio de Janeiro

Member of the Municipal Chamber of Rio de Janeiro
- Incumbent
- Assumed office 1 January 2021
- Constituency: At-large

Personal details
- Born: Douglas de Souza Gomes; 2 May 1990 (age 36)
- Party: PL

Douglas de Souza Gomes (born 2 May 1990) is a Brazilian politician who was elected member of the Chamber of Deputies in 2026. From 2021 to 2026, he was a municipal councillor of Niterói.
