= Amanda Gentil =

Brazilian politician (born 1998)

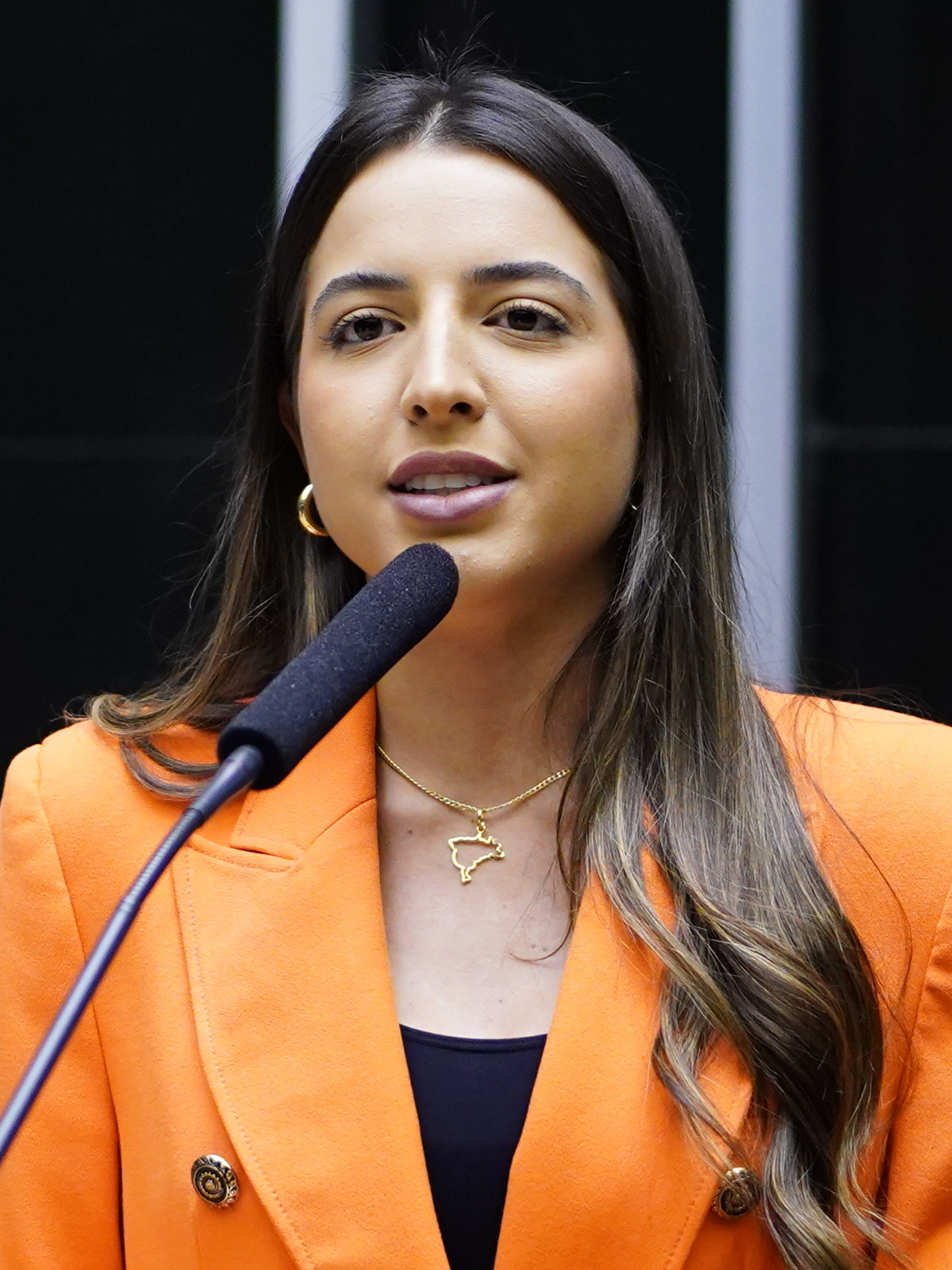
- Gentil in 2023

Member of the Chamber of Deputies
- Incumbent
- Assumed office 1 February 2023
- Constituency: Maranhão

Personal details
- Born: Amanda Kelly Gentil Guimarães Rosa; 25 December 1998 (age 27) Caxias, Maranhão, Brazil
- Party: PP (since 2022)

Amanda Kelly Gentil Guimarães Rosa (born 25 December 1998) is a Brazilian politician serving as a member of the Chamber of Deputies since 2023. From 2021 to 2023, she served as secretary of government of Caxias.
