= Saullo Vianna =

Brazilian politician (born 1984)

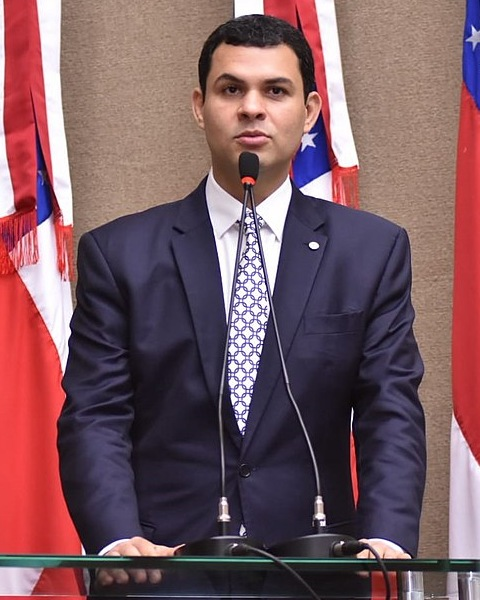
- Vianna in 2021

Member of the Chamber of Deputies
- Incumbent
- Assumed office 1 February 2023
- Constituency: Amazonas

Personal details
- Born: 22 June 1984 (age 42)
- Party: MDB (since 2026)

Saullo Velame Vianna (born 22 June 1984) is a Brazilian politician serving as a member of the Chamber of Deputies since 2023. From 2019 to 2023, he was a member of the Legislative Assembly of Amazonas.
