= Gabriel Nunes (politician) =

Brazilian politician (born 1983)

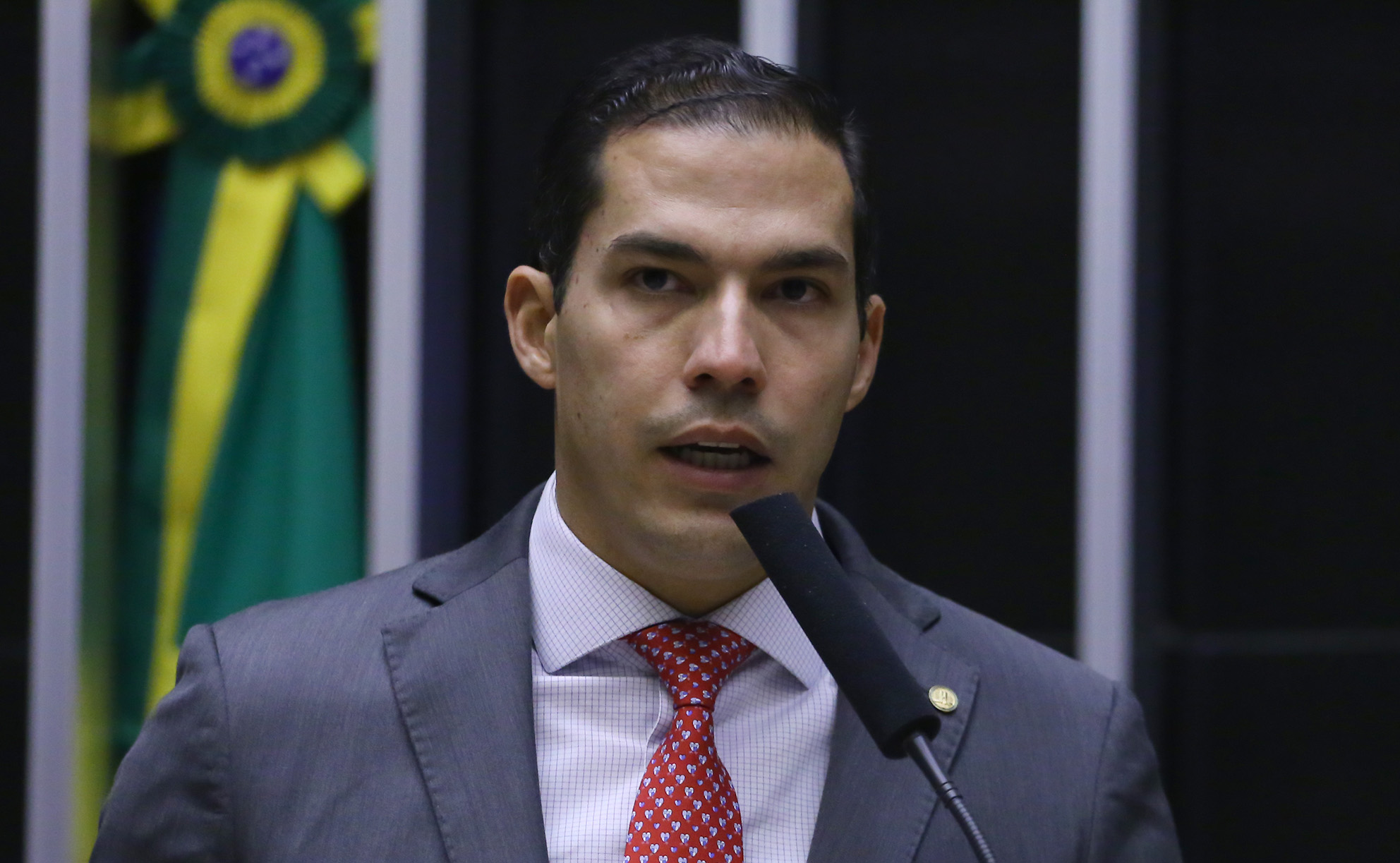
- Nunes in 2023

Member of the Chamber of Deputies
- Incumbent
- Assumed office 1 February 2023
- Constituency: Bahia

Personal details
- Born: Gabriel José Moura Nunes Soares; 23 July 1983 (age 43) Euclides da Cunha, Bahia, Brazil
- Party: PSD (since 2011)
- Other political affiliations: DEM (2005–2011)
- Parent: José Nunes Soares (father)

Gabriel José Moura Nunes Soares (born 23 July 1983) is a Brazilian politician serving as a member of the Chamber of Deputies since 2023. He is the son of José Nunes Soares.
