= Rafael Prudente =

Brazilian politician (born 1983)

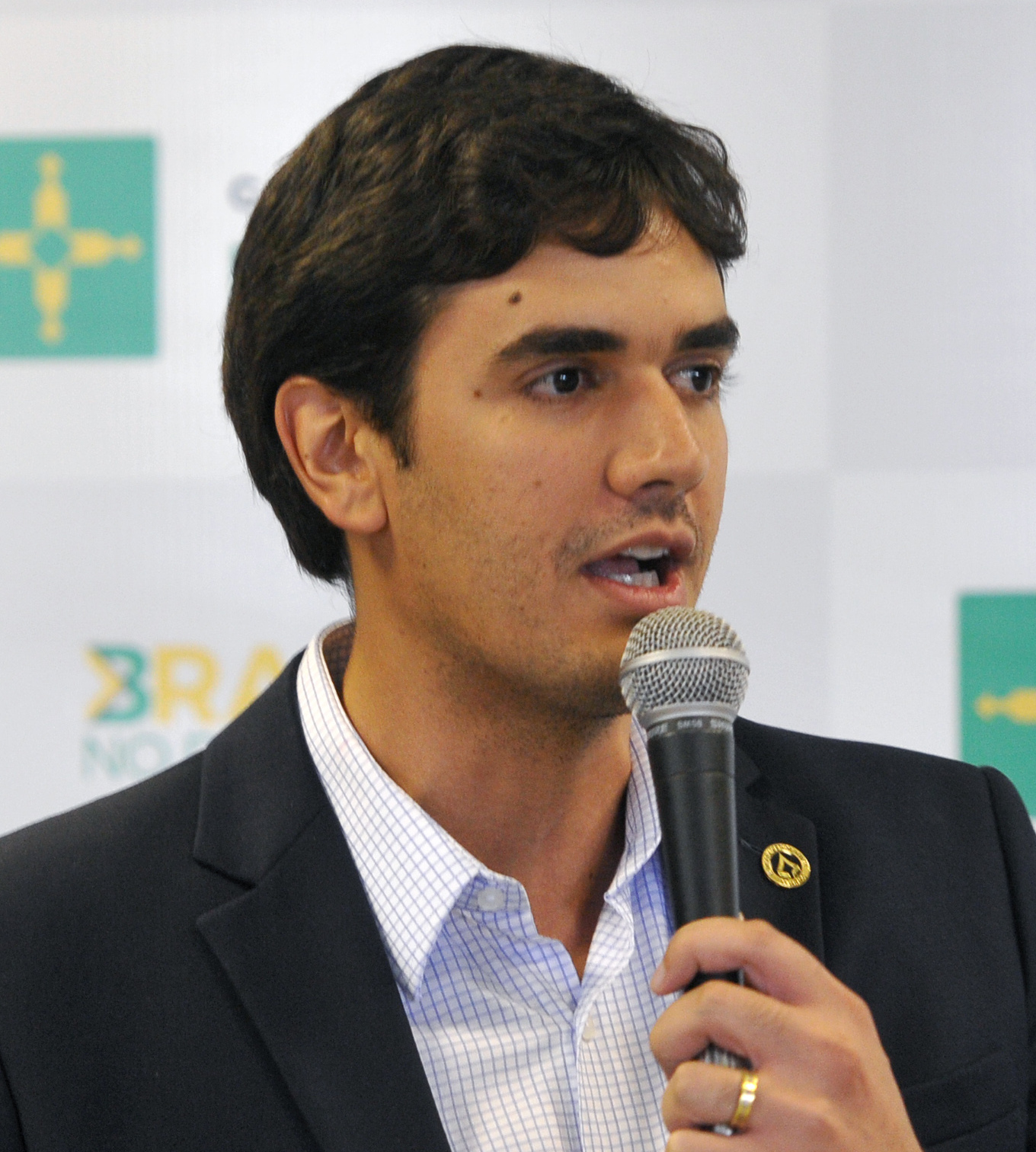
- Prudente in 2017

Member of the Chamber of Deputies
- Incumbent
- Assumed office 1 February 2023
- Constituency: Federal District

Personal details
- Born: 5 November 1983 (age 42)
- Party: Brazilian Democratic Movement (since 2013)

Rafael Cavalcanti Prudente (born 5 November 1983) is a Brazilian politician serving as a member of the Chamber of Deputies since 2023. From 2019 to 2022, he served as president of the Legislative Chamber of the Federal District.
