= Igor Santos =

Brazilian politician (born 1997)

Member-elect of the Chamber of Deputies
- Assuming office 1 February 2027
- Constituency: Minas Gerais

Personal details
- Born: Igor Pereira dos Santos; 9 February 1997 (age 29) Paracatu, Minas Gerais, Brazil
- Party: PL
- Education: Federal University of Minas Gerais

Igor Pereira dos Santos (born 9 February 1997) is a Brazilian politician who was elected member of the Chamber of Deputies in 2026. From 2021 to 2026, he served as mayor of Paracatu.
