= Júlia Nunes =

Brazilian politician (born 1988)

Member-elect of the Chamber of Deputies
- Assuming office 1 February 2027
- Constituency: Alagoas

Personal details
- Born: Júlia Nunes Bentes Leal; 16 November 1988 (age 37) Maceió, Alagoas, Brazil
- Party: PSD (since 2026)
- Other political affiliations: UNIÃO (until 2026)
- Profession: Lawyer

Júlia Nunes Bentes Leal (born 16 November 1988) is a Brazilian politician who was elected member of the Chamber of Deputies in 2026. She previously worked as a criminal defense lawyer, specializing in consumer protection and violence against women.

== Electoral history ==
Year	Election	Party	Office	Votes	Percent	Result
2024	Municipal Election of Maceió	UNIÃO	Councillor	5,286	1.16%	Surrogate
2026	State Elections of Alagoas	PSD	Federal Deputy	71,825	3.99%	Elected
