= Jack Rocha =

Brazilian politician (born 1983)

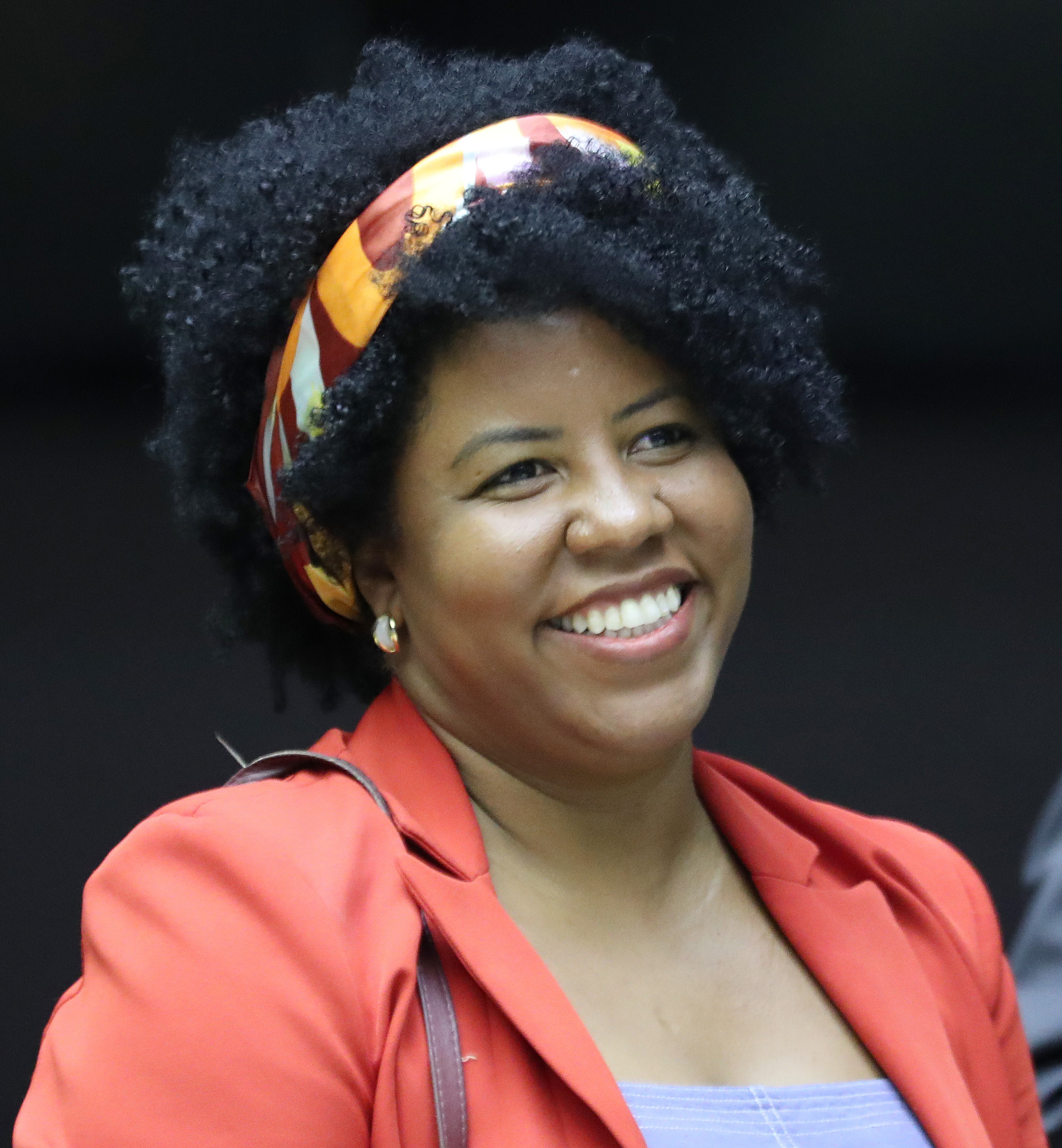
- Rocha in 2023

Member of the Chamber of Deputies
- Incumbent
- Assumed office 1 February 2023
- Constituency: Espírito Santo

Personal details
- Born: Jackeline Oliveira Rocha; 26 August 1983 (age 43) Colatina, Espírito Santo, Brazil
- Party: PT (since 2004)

Jackeline Oliveira Rocha (born 26 August 1983), better known as Jack Rocha, is a Brazilian politician serving as a member of the Chamber of Deputies since 2023. From 2019 to 2025, she served as president of the Workers' Party in Espírito Santo.
