= Leo Prates =

Brazilian politician (born 1978)

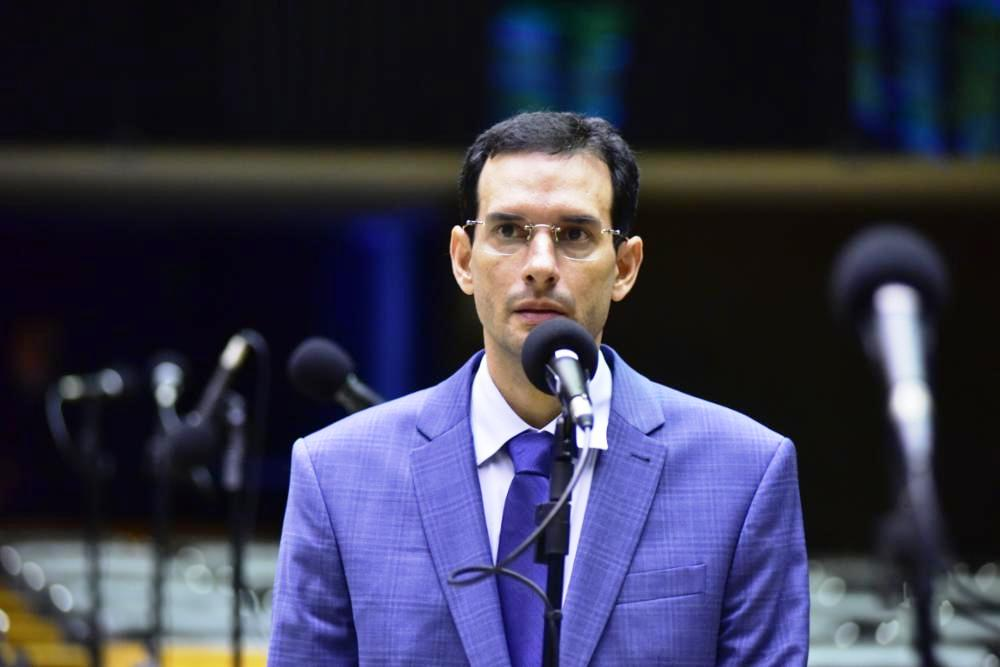
- Prates in 2023

Member of the Chamber of Deputies
- Incumbent
- Assumed office 1 February 2023
- Constituency: Bahia

Member of the Legislative Assembly of Bahia
- In office 1 February 2019 – 1 February 2023
- Constituency: At-large

Member of the Municipal Chamber of Salvador
- In office 1 January 2013 – 1 February 2019
- Constituency: At-large

Personal details
- Born: Leonardo Silva Prates; 5 April 1978 (age 48) Salvador, Bahia, Brazil
- Party: Republicanos (since 2026)
- Other political affiliations: PFL (2003–2007); DEM (2007–2020); PDT (2020–2026)
- Profession: Electrical engineer

Leonardo Silva Prates (born 5 April 1978) is a Brazilian politician serving as a member of the Chamber of Deputies since 2023. From 2019 to 2022, he was a member of the Legislative Assembly of Bahia.
