= Daniel Agrobom =

Brazilian politician (born 1968)

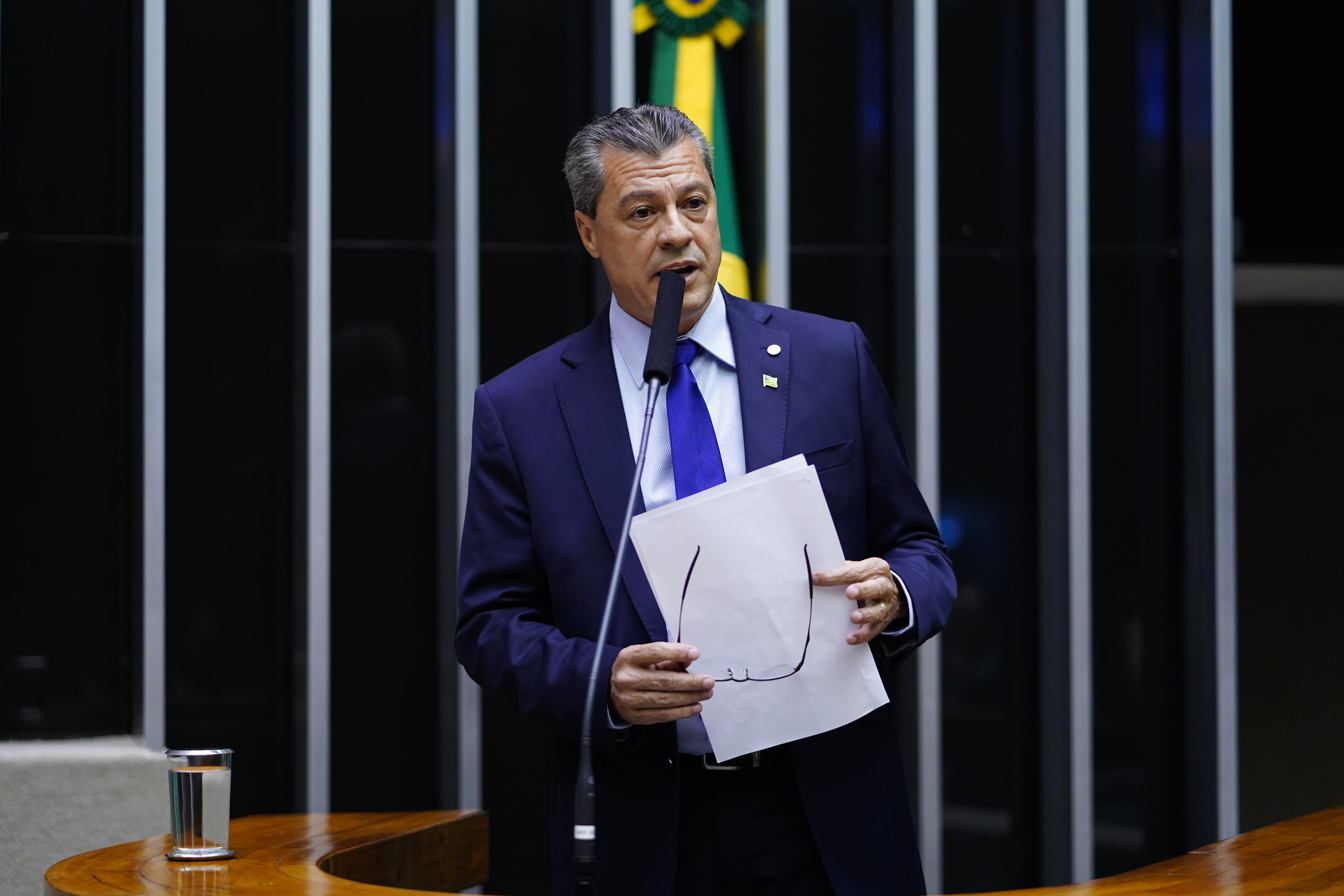
- Agrobom in 2023

Member of the Chamber of Deputies
- Incumbent
- Assumed office 1 February 2023
- Constituency: Goiás

Personal details
- Born: 2 July 1968 (age 58)
- Party: MDB (since 2026)
- Other political affiliations: Liberal Party (2022-2026)

Daniel Vieira Ramos (born 2 July 1968), better known as Daniel Agrobom, is a Brazilian politician serving as a member of the Chamber of Deputies since 2023. From 2015 to 2020, he served as mayor of Bom Jesus de Goiás.
