= Zé Vitor (politician) =

Brazilian politician (born 1984)

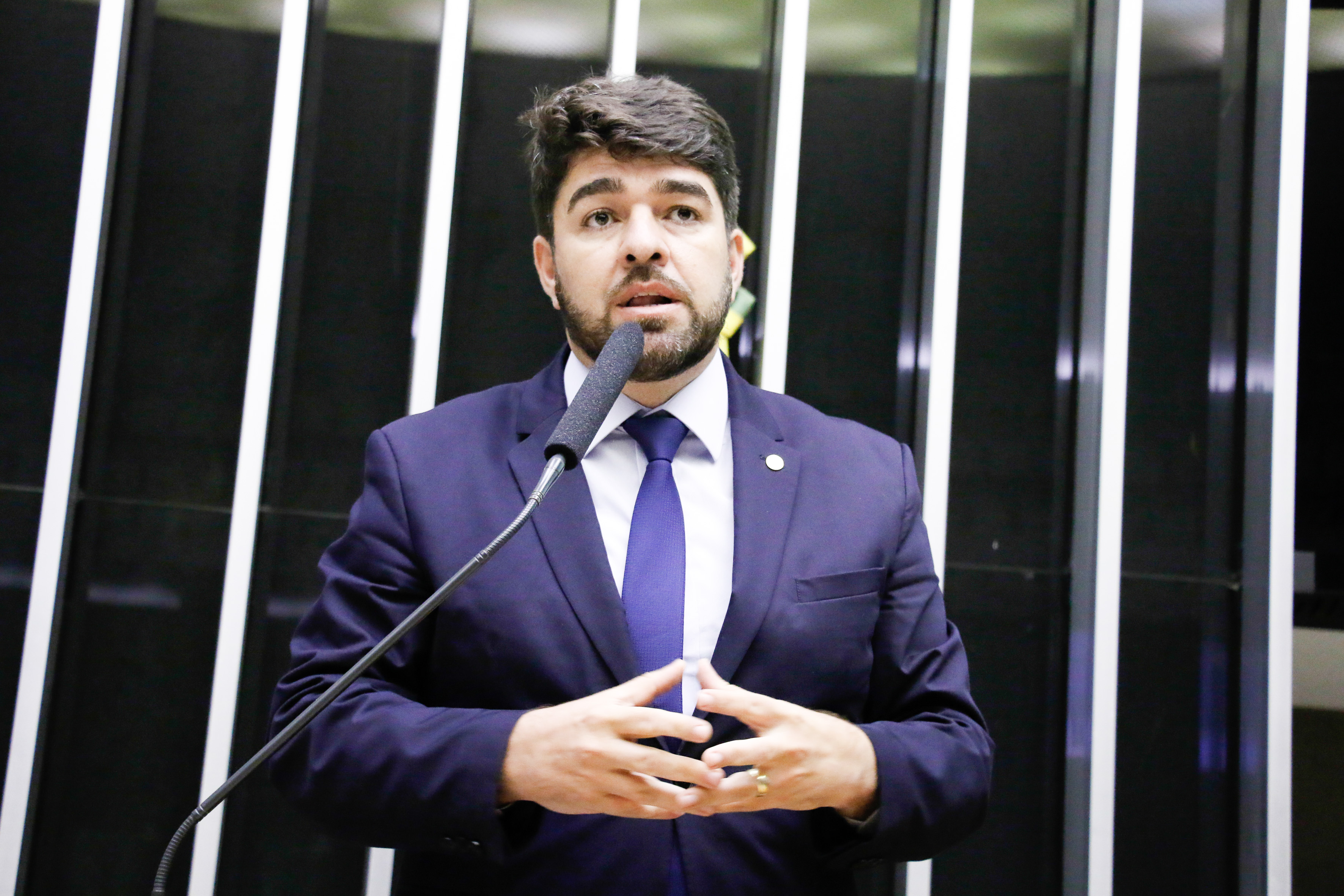
- Vitor in 2021

Member of the Chamber of Deputies
- Incumbent
- Assumed office 1 February 2019
- Constituency: Minas Gerais

Personal details
- Born: 1 November 1984 (age 41)
- Party: Liberal Party (since 2019)

José Vitor de Resende Aguiar, better known as Zé Vitor (born 1 November 1984), is a Brazilian politician serving as a member of the Chamber of Deputies since 2019. He has served as chairman of the health committee since 2025, having previously served in 2023.
