= Rodrigo Mesquita =

Brazilian politician (born 1995)

Member-elect of the Chamber of Deputies
- Assuming office 1 February 2027
- Constituency: Roraima

Personal details
- Born: Rodrigo Fernandes Mesquita; 13 May 1995 (age 31) Boa Vista, Roraima, Brazil
- Party: PODE

Rodrigo Fernandes Mesquita (born 13 May 1995) is a Brazilian politician who was elected member of the Chamber of Deputies in 2026. He previously served as director of the Cooperativa Agropecuária de Roraima and as president of the Fundo de Desenvolvimento da Pecuária de Roraima.
