= Carlos Muniz (politician) =

Brazilian politician (born 2001)

Member-elect of the Chamber of Deputies
- Assuming office 1 February 2027
- Constituency: Bahia

Personal details
- Born: Carlos da Silva Muniz Filho; 23 July 2001 (age 25) Salvador, Bahia, Brazil
- Party: PSDB
- Profession: Physician

Carlos da Silva Muniz Filho (born 23 July 2001) is a Brazilian politician who was elected member of the Chamber of Deputies in 2026. He works as a medical doctor.
