= Wesley Cezar =

Brazilian politician (born 1981)

Member-elect of the Chamber of Deputies
- Assuming office 1 February 2027
- Constituency: São Paulo

Personal details
- Born: Wesley Leonardo Cezar; 7 July 1981 (age 45)
- Party: PL

Wesley Leonardo Cezar (born 7 July 1981), also known as Lelinho, is a Brazilian politician who was elected member of the Chamber of Deputies in 2026. He is the son of Marmo Cezar and the brother of Elvis Cezar.
