= Coronel Assis =

Brazilian politician (born 1976)

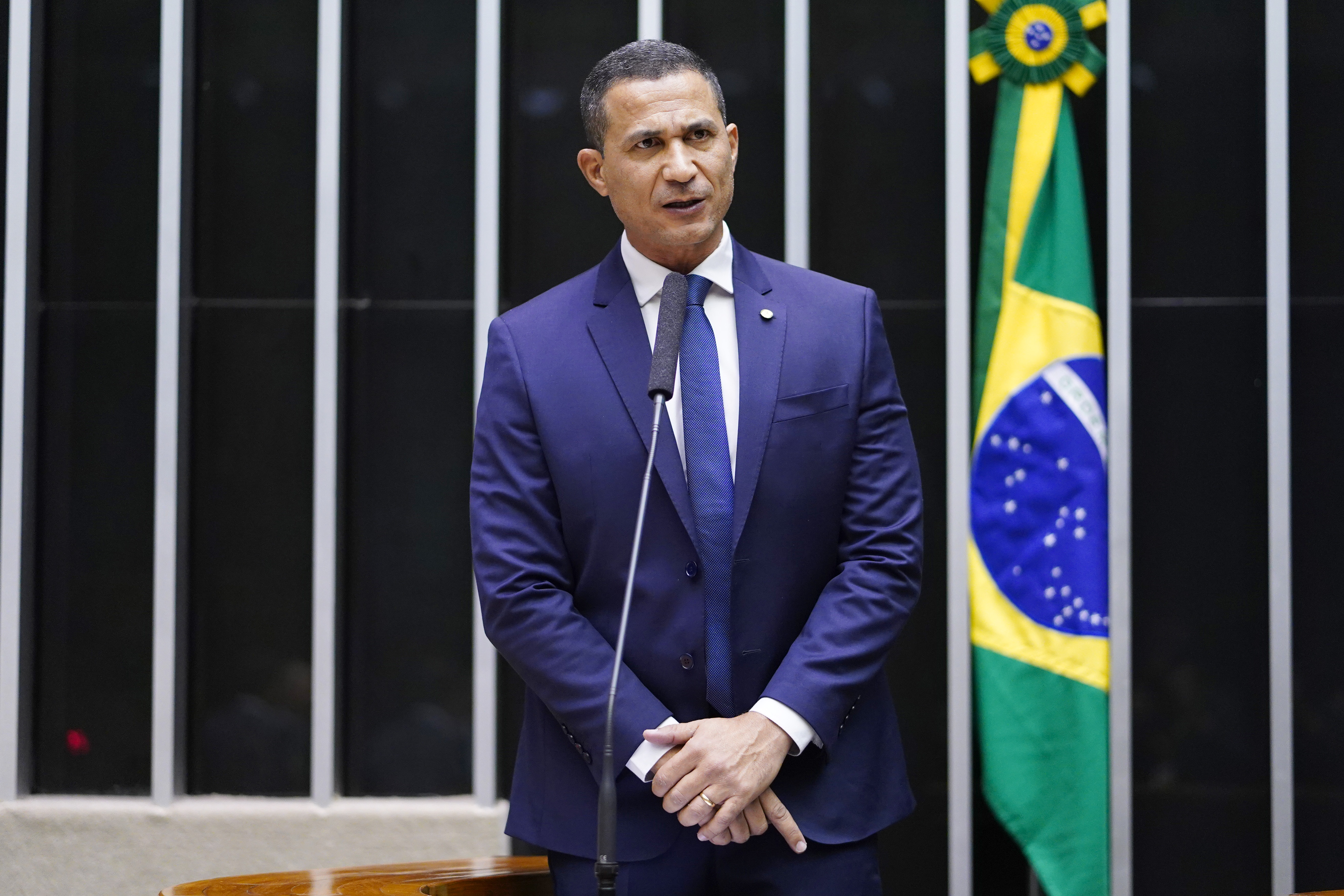
- Assis in 2023

Member of the Chamber of Deputies
- Incumbent
- Assumed office 1 February 2023
- Constituency: Mato Grosso

Personal details
- Born: 16 April 1976 (age 50)
- Party: PL (since 2026)
- Other political affiliations: Brazil Union (2022-2026)

Jonildo de José Assis (born 16 April 1976), better known as Coronel Assis, is a Brazilian politician serving as a member of the Chamber of Deputies since 2023. From 2019 to 2022, he served as commandant-general of the Military Police of Mato Grosso.

== Political Career ==
In 2022, he ran for the office of Federal Deputy for Mato Grosso and was elected with 47.479 votes. Initially affiliated with União Brasil, he switched to the Liberal Party (PL) in March 2026.

== Election results ==
Year	Election	Position	Party	Votes	Results	Ref.
2022	State of Mato Grosso	Federal deputy	UNIAO	47.479	Elected	
