= 2026 Brazilian legislative election =

- Chamber of Deputies
- 4 October 2026
- All 513 seats in the Chamber of Deputies; 257 seats needed for a majority
| Party | Leader | Vote % | Seats | +/– |
|---|---|---|---|---|
| PL | Sóstenes Cavalcante | 22.69 | 121 | +22 |
| FE Brasil | Pedro Uczai | 14.81 | 88 | +7 |
| UNIÃO | Moses Rodrigues | 13.69 | 87 | −19 |
| PSD | Antonio Brito | 8.34 | 43 | +1 |
| Republicanos | Augusto Coutinho | 7.10 | 41 | +1 |
| MDB | Isnaldo Bulhões | 7.00 | 36 | −6 |
| PODE | Rodrigo Gambale | 5.28 | 27 | +9 |
| PSOL-REDE | Tarcísio Motta | 4.91 | 15 | +1 |
| PSB | Jonas Donizette | 4.44 | 15 | +1 |
| PSDB–Cidadania | Adolfo Viana | 2.80 | 11 | −7 |
| NOVO | Gilson Marques | 2.58 | 10 | +7 |
| Solidary Renewal | Áureo Ribeiro | 1.98 | 7 | −2 |
| PDT | André Figueiredo | 1.50 | 6 | −11 |
| Avante | Waldemar Oliveira | 1.62 | 5 | −2 |
| Missão | Kim Kataguiri | 1.04 | 1 | New |
This lists parties that won seats. See the complete results below.
- Federal Senate
- 4 October 2026
- 54 of the 81 seats in the Federal Senate; 41 seats needed for a majority
| Party | Leader | Vote % | Seats | +/– |
|---|---|---|---|---|
| PL | Carlos Portinho | 28.11 | 29 | +14 |
| PT | Camilo Santana | 13.16 | 9 | 0 |
| MDB | Eduardo Braga | 5.73 | 8 | −1 |
| PP | Tereza Cristina | 10.65 | 6 | −2 |
| Republicanos | Alan Rick | 4.30 | 6 | 0 |
| UNIÃO | Dorinha Rezende | 3.84 | 5 | +2 |
| PSD | Omar Aziz | 5.07 | 5 | −9 |
| PSB | Cid Gomes | 7.14 | 4 | −2 |
| NOVO | | 5.34 | 3 | +3 |
| PODE | Alexandre Giordano | 1.91 | 2 | −1 |
| PSDB | Plínio Valério | 1.34 | 2 | −2 |
| REDE | | 5.20 | 1 | +1 |
| PDT | Weverton Rocha | 2.60 | 1 | −1 |
This lists parties that won seats. See the complete results below.

Legislative elections were held in Brazil on 4 October 2026 as part of the nationwide general elections to elect members of the National Congress. Although the Worker's Party candidate, incumbent president Lula da Silva won a fourth term in office, the Liberal Party won pluralities in both the Federal Senate and the Chamber of Deputies. The result of the legislative elections compared to the presidential elections, marked what has been described as the result of increasing hostility towards Lula.

== Previous composition ==
The results of the previous general elections and the current composition of the National Congress are given below. The party composition changed during the course of the legislature due to replacements of members, changes in their party affiliation, and mergers of parties. In 2026, all members of the Chamber of Deputies and two thirds of the Senate (two senators from each state and the Federal District) will be up for election.

Composition of the National Congress of Brazil
| Party | Chamber of Deputies | | | Senate | | | | | |
| Party | Elected | Incumbent | +/– | Elected | | Incumbent | +/– | Up for election | |
| Party | 2022 | 2026 | +/– | 2018 | 2022 | 2026 | +/– | 2026 | 2030 |
|---|---|---|---|---|---|---|---|---|---|
| Liberal Party (Note: Named Party of the Republic before 2019.) | 99 | 98 | ▼1 | 1 | 8 | 16 | ▲7 | 6 | 10 |
| Workers' Party | 69 | 64 | ▼5 | 4 | 4 | 9 | ▲1 | 6 | 3 |
| Brazil Union (Note: Part of the Progressive Union) | 59 | 52 | ▼7 | 8 (Note: 4 senators from the Social Liberal Party and 4 senators from Democrats, which merged to form Brazil Union in 2022.) | 5 | 3 | ▼10 | 1 | 2 |
| Progressistas (Note: Part of the Progressive Union) | 47 | 46 | ▼1 | 5 | 3 | 7 | ▼1 | 4 | 3 |
| Social Democratic Party | 42 | 48 | ▲6 | 4 | 2 | 14 | ▲8 | 11 | 3 |
| Brazilian Democratic Movement | 42 | 38 | ▼4 | 7 | 1 | 9 | ▲1 | 8 | 1 |
| Republicans (Note: Named Brazilian Republican Party before 2019.) | 40 | 42 | ▲2 | 1 | 2 | 6 | ▲3 | 2 | 4 |
| Podemos | 18 (Note: Including 6 deputies from the Social Christian Party, which merged into Podemos in 2023.) | 27 | ▲9 | 4 (Note: Including 2 senators from the Humanist Party of Solidarity and 1 senator from the Social Christian Party, which merged into Podemos in 2019 and 2023.) | 1 (Note: Senator from the Social Christian Party, which merged into Podemos in 2023.) | 3 | ▼2 | 3 | 0 |
| Democratic Labour Party | 17 | 10 | ▼7 | 2 | 0 | 2 | Steady | 2 | 0 |
| Brazilian Socialist Party | 14 | 17 | ▲3 | 2 | 1 | 7 | ▲4 | 6 | 1 |
| Brazilian Social Democracy Party | 13 | 18 | ▲5 | 4 | 0 | 4 | Steady | 4 | 0 |
| Socialism and Liberty Party | 12 | 13 | ▲1 | 0 | 0 | 0 | Steady | 0 | 0 |
| Avante | 7 | 5 | ▼2 | 0 | 0 | 1 | ▲1 | 1 | 0 |
| Solidarity | 7 (Note: Including 3 deputies from the Republican Party of the Social Order, which merged into Solidarity in 2023.) | 4 | ▼3 | 2 (Note: Including 1 senator from the Republican Party of the Social Order, which merged into Solidarity in 2023.) | 0 | 0 | ▼2 | 0 | 0 |
| Communist Party of Brazil | 6 | 11 | ▲5 | 0 | 0 | 0 | Steady | 0 | 0 |
| Green Party | 6 | 6 | Steady | 0 | 0 | 0 | Steady | 0 | 0 |
| Democratic Renewal Party | 5 (Note: 4 deputies from Patriota and 1 deputy from the Brazilian Labour Party, which merged to form the Democratic Renewal Party in 2023.) | 3 | ▼2 | 3 (Note: 1 senator from the Progressive Republican Party, which merged into Patriota in 2019, and 2 senators from the Brazilian Labour Party, which merged with Patriota to form the Democratic Renewal Party in 2023.) | 0 | 0 | ▼3 | 0 | 0 |
| Cidadania (Note: Named Popular Socialist Party before 2019.) | 5 | 2 | ▼3 | 2 | 0 | 0 | ▼2 | 0 | 0 |
| New Party | 3 | 5 | ▲2 | 0 | 0 | 0 | Steady | 0 | 0 |
| Sustainability Network | 2 | 3 | ▲1 | 5 | 0 | 0 | ▼5 | 0 | 0 |
| Mission Party | —N/a | 1 | ▲1 | —N/a | —N/a | 0 | Steady | 0 | 0 |
| Total | 513 | 513 | Steady | 54 | 27 | 81 | Steady | 54 | 27 |

Outgoing senators
| Federative Unit | Senator | Party |
|---|---|---|
| Acre | Marcio Bittar | Liberal Party |
| Acre | Sérgio de Oliveira Cunha | Social Democratic Party |
| Alagoas | Eudócia Caldas | Brazilian Social Democracy Party |
| Alagoas | Renan Calheiros | Brazilian Democratic Movement |
| Amapá | Lucas Barreto | Social Democratic Party |
| Amapá | Randolfe Rodrigues | Workers' Party |
| Amazonas | Eduardo Braga | Brazilian Democratic Movement |
| Amazonas | Plínio Valério | Brazilian Social Democracy Party |
| Bahia | Angelo Coronel | Republicans |
| Bahia | Jaques Wagner | Workers' Party |
| Ceará | Cid Gomes | Brazilian Socialist Party |
| Ceará | Reginauro Nascimento | Brazilian Social Democracy Party |
| Espírito Santo | Fabiano Contarato | Workers' Party |
| Espírito Santo | Marcos do Val | Avante |
| Federal District | Leany Lemos | Brazilian Socialist Party |
| Federal District | Izalci Lucas | Liberal Party |
| Goiás | Vanderlan Cardoso | Social Democratic Party |
| Goiás | Jorge Kajuru | Brazilian Socialist Party |
| Maranhão | Eliziane Gama | Social Democratic Party |
| Maranhão | Weverton Rocha | Democratic Labour Party |
| Mato Grosso | Jayme Campos | Brazil Union |
| Mato Grosso | Carlos Fávaro | Social Democratic Party |
| Mato Grosso do Sul | Soraya Thronicke | Brazilian Socialist Party |
| Mato Grosso do Sul | Nelsinho Trad | Social Democratic Party |
| Minas Gerais | Rodrigo Pacheco | Brazilian Socialist Party |
| Minas Gerais | Carlos Viana | Social Democratic Party |
| Pará | Jader Barbalho | Brazilian Democratic Movement |
| Pará | Zequinha Marinho | Podemos |
| Paraíba | Veneziano Vital do Rêgo | Brazilian Democratic Movement |
| Paraíba | Daniella Ribeiro | Progressistas |
| Paraná | Flávio Arns | Brazilian Socialist Party |
| Paraná | Oriovisto Guimarães | Brazilian Social Democracy Party |
| Pernambuco | Humberto Costa | Workers' Party |
| Pernambuco | Fernando Dueire | Social Democratic Party |
| Piauí | Marcelo Castro | Brazilian Democratic Movement |
| Piauí | Ciro Nogueira | Progressistas |
| Rio de Janeiro | Flávio Bolsonaro | Liberal Party |
| Rio de Janeiro | Carlos Portinho | Liberal Party |
| Rio Grande do Norte | Zenaide Maia | Social Democratic Party |
| Rio Grande do Norte | Styvenson Valentim | Podemos |
| Rio Grande do Sul | Luis Carlos Heinze | Progressistas |
| Rio Grande do Sul | Paulo Paim | Workers' Party |
| Rondônia | Marcos Rogério Brito | Liberal Party |
| Rondônia | Confúcio Moura | Brazilian Democratic Movement |
| Roraima | Roberta Acioly | Republicans |
| Roraima | Chico Rodrigues | Brazilian Socialist Party |
| Santa Catarina | Esperidião Amin | Progressistas |
| Santa Catarina | Ivete da Silveira | Brazilian Democratic Movement |
| São Paulo | Mara Gabrilli | Social Democratic Party |
| São Paulo | Alexandre Giordano | Podemos |
| Sergipe | Rogério Carvalho | Workers' Party |
| Sergipe | Alessandro Vieira | Brazilian Democratic Movement |
| Tocantins | Irajá Abreu | Social Democratic Party |
| Tocantins | Eduardo Gomes | Liberal Party |

== Results ==
=== Chamber of Deputies ===
| Party or alliance | | Votes | % | Seats | +/– |
|---|---|---|---|---|---|
| Liberal Party | | 25,824,755 | 22.69 | 121 | +22 |
| Brazil of Hope | Workers' Party | 14,793,128 | 13.00 | 70 | +1 |
| Brazil of Hope | Green Party | 1,368,491 | 1.20 | 7 | +1 |
| Brazil of Hope | Communist Party of Brazil | 1,306,368 | 1.15 | 11 | +5 |
| Progressive Union | Brazil Union | 7,876,904 | 6.92 | 46 | –13 |
| Progressive Union | Progressistas | 7,616,758 | 6.69 | 41 | –6 |
| Social Democratic Party | | 9,391,321 | 8.25 | 43 | +1 |
| Republicanos | | 7,911,780 | 6.95 | 41 | +1 |
| Brazilian Democratic Movement | | 7,890,384 | 6.93 | 36 | –6 |
| Podemos | | 5,887,427 | 5.17 | 27 | +9 (Note: Compared to the combined results of Podemos and the Social Christian Party in 2022. The Social Christian Party merged into Podemos in 2023.) |
| PSOL REDE | Socialism and Liberty Party | 5,312,161 | 4.67 | 14 | +2 |
| PSOL REDE | Sustainability Network | 264,181 | 0.23 | 1 | –1 |
| Brazilian Socialist Party | | 5,007,692 | 4.40 | 15 | +1 |
| PSDB Cidadania | Brazilian Social Democracy Party | 2,742,544 | 2.41 | 11 | –2 |
| PSDB Cidadania | Cidadania | 291,324 | 0.26 | 0 | –5 |
| New Party | | 2,914,364 | 2.56 | 10 | +7 |
| Solidary Renewal | Democratic Renewal Party | 1,203,659 | 1.06 | 5 | 0 (Note: Compared to the combined results of the Brazilian Labour Party and Patriot in 2022. The two parties merged to form the Democratic Renewal Party in 2022.) |
| Solidary Renewal | Solidarity | 1,049,014 | 0.92 | 2 | –2 |
| Democratic Labour Party | | 1,868,424 | 1.64 | 6 | –11 |
| Avante | | 1,807,942 | 1.59 | 5 | –2 |
| Mission Party | | 1,223,569 | 1.08 | 1 | New |
| Christian Democracy | | 114,402 | 0.10 | 0 | 0 |
| Popular Unity | | 45,431 | 0.04 | 0 | 0 |
| National Mobilization | | 34,272 | 0.03 | 0 | 0 |
| Democrat | | 27,195 | 0.02 | 0 | 0 (Note: Compared to the Brazilian Woman's Party in 2022. The party was renamed to Democrat in 2025.) |
| United Socialist Workers' Party | | 18,696 | 0.02 | 0 | 0 |
| Agir | | 7,155 | 0.01 | 0 | 0 |
| Workers' Cause Party | | 3,041 | 0.00 | 0 | 0 |
| Brazilian Communist Party | | 0 | 0.00 | 0 | 0 |
| Brazilian Labour Renewal Party | | 0 | 0.00 | 0 | 0 |
| Total | | 113,802,382 | 100.00 | 513 | 0 |
| Valid votes | | 113,802,382 | 91.40 | | |
| Invalid votes | | 4,264,784 | 3.43 | | |
| Blank votes | | 6,445,372 | 5.18 | | |
| Total votes | | 124,512,538 | 100.00 | | |
| Registered voters/turnout | | 158,745,502 | 78.44 | | |

Popular vote
| PL | 22.69% |
| FE Brasil | 15.35% |
| UPB | 13.61% |
| PSD | 8.25% |
| Republicanos | 6.95% |
| MDB | 6.93% |
| PODE | 5.17% |
| PSOL REDE | 4.90% |
| PSB | 4.40% |
| PSDB Cidadania | 2.67% |
| NOVO | 2.56% |
| Solidary Renewal | 1.98% |
| PDT | 1.64% |
| Avante | 1.59% |
| MISSÃO | 1.08% |

Parliamentary seats
| PL | 23.58% |
| FE Brasil | 17.15% |
| UPB | 16.96% |
| PSD | 8.38% |
| Republicanos | 7.99% |
| MDB | 7.02% |
| PODE | 5.26% |
| PSOL REDE | 2.92% |
| PSB | 2.92% |
| PSDB Cidadania | 2.14% |
| NOVO | 1.95% |
| Solidary Renewal | 1.36% |
| PDT | 1.17% |
| Avante | 0.97% |
| MISSÃO | 0.19% |

==== Results by federative unit ====
| Federative unit | Seats | PL | FE Brasil | UPB | PSD | REP | MDB | PODE | Others |
|---|---|---|---|---|---|---|---|---|---|
| Acre | 8 | 1 | 1 | 4 | — | 1 | 1 | 0 | 0 |
| Alagoas | 9 | 0 | 0 | 4 | 2 | — | 2 | — | 1 |
| Amapá | 8 | 1 | 1 | 3 | 0 | — | 0 | 1 | 2 |
| Amazonas | 8 | 2 | 0 | 2 | 1 | 1 | 2 | 0 | 0 |
| Bahia | 39 | 4 | 10 | 8 | 6 | 3 | 1 | 0 | 7 |
| Ceará | 22 | 4 | 3 | 3 | 3 | 1 | 2 | 0 | 6 |
| Espírito Santo | 10 | 2 | 2 | 3 | 0 | 1 | — | 1 | 1 |
| Federal District | 8 | 3 | 2 | 0 | 0 | 1 | 1 | 0 | 1 |
| Goiás | 17 | 4 | 2 | 4 | 2 | 1 | 2 | 1 | 1 |
| Maranhão | 18 | 4 | 2 | 3 | 0 | 1 | 5 | 0 | 3 |
| Mato Grosso | 8 | 3 | 1 | 2 | 0 | 1 | — | 1 | 0 |
| Mato Grosso do Sul | 8 | 3 | 1 | 2 | — | 2 | 0 | — | 0 |
| Minas Gerais | 53 | 21 | 13 | 6 | 2 | 3 | 1 | 1 | 6 |
| Pará | 17 | 3 | 2 | 1 | 2 | 0 | 6 | 2 | 1 |
| Paraíba | 12 | 2 | 2 | 3 | 1 | 3 | — | 1 | 0 |
| Paraná | 30 | 5 | 6 | 6 | 4 | 2 | 1 | 2 | 4 |
| Pernambuco | 25 | 2 | 4 | 4 | 2 | 2 | 1 | 3 | 7 |
| Piauí | 10 | 0 | 4 | 1 | 2 | 1 | 2 | 0 | 0 |
| Rio de Janeiro | 46 | 15 | 8 | 6 | 4 | 1 | 1 | 0 | 11 |
| Rio Grande do Norte | 8 | 3 | 3 | 2 | — | — | — | — | 0 |
| Rio Grande do Sul | 31 | 8 | 6 | 5 | 2 | 2 | 3 | 2 | 3 |
| Rondônia | 8 | 3 | 0 | 2 | 1 | 0 | 0 | 2 | 0 |
| Roraima | 8 | 1 | 0 | 2 | — | 3 | 0 | 2 | 0 |
| Santa Catarina | 16 | 7 | 3 | 1 | 1 | 1 | 1 | 1 | 1 |
| São Paulo | 70 | 19 | 11 | 5 | 6 | 6 | 4 | 6 | 13 |
| Sergipe | 8 | 0 | 1 | 3 | 2 | 1 | 0 | 0 | 1 |
| Tocantins | 8 | 1 | 0 | 2 | — | 3 | — | 1 | 1 |
| Total | 513 | 121 | 88 | 87 | 43 | 41 | 36 | 27 | 70 |
Source: Superior Electoral Court

=== Federal Senate ===
| Party or alliance | | Votes | % | Seats | | |
| Party or alliance | | Votes | % | Elected | Total | +/– |
|---|---|---|---|---|---|---|
| Liberal Party | | 58,307,861 | 28.11 | 19 | 29 | +14 |
| Brazil of Hope | Workers' Party | 27,306,998 | 13.16 | 6 | 9 | 0 |
| Brazil of Hope | Green Party | 5,644 | 0.00 | 0 | 0 | 0 |
| Brazil of Hope | Communist Party of Brazil | 0 | 0.00 | 0 | 0 | 0 |
| Brazilian Democratic Movement | | 11,881,617 | 5.73 | 7 | 8 | –1 |
| Progressive Union | Progressistas | 22,082,660 | 10.65 | 3 | 6 | –2 |
| Progressive Union | Brazil Union | 7,968,162 | 3.84 | 3 | 5 | +2 |
| Republicanos | | 8,911,223 | 4.30 | 2 | 6 | 0 |
| Social Democratic Party | | 10,522,601 | 5.07 | 2 | 5 | –9 |
| Brazilian Socialist Party | | 14,804,125 | 7.14 | 3 | 4 | –2 |
| New Party | | 11,067,357 | 5.34 | 3 | 3 | +3 |
| PSDB Cidadania | Brazilian Social Democracy Party | 2,789,626 | 1.34 | 2 | 2 | –2 |
| PSDB Cidadania | Cidadania | 205,849 | 0.10 | 0 | 0 | 0 |
| Podemos | | 3,951,521 | 1.91 | 2 | 2 | –1 |
| PSOL REDE | Sustainability Network | 10,777,999 | 5.20 | 1 | 1 | +1 |
| PSOL REDE | Socialism and Liberty Party | 8,028,938 | 3.87 | 0 | 0 | 0 |
| Democratic Labour Party | | 5,395,434 | 2.60 | 1 | 1 | –1 |
| Solidary Renewal | Democratic Renewal Party | 608,874 | 0.29 | 0 | 0 | 0 |
| Solidary Renewal | Solidarity | 134,992 | 0.07 | 0 | 0 | 0 |
| Mission Party | | 684,138 | 0.33 | 0 | 0 | 0 |
| National Mobilization | | 533,859 | 0.26 | 0 | 0 | 0 |
| Popular Unity | | 431,082 | 0.21 | 0 | 0 | 0 |
| Avante | | 406,723 | 0.20 | 0 | 0 | –1 |
| United Socialist Workers' Party | | 216,829 | 0.10 | 0 | 0 | 0 |
| Christian Democracy | | 189,353 | 0.09 | 0 | 0 | 0 |
| Democrata | | 67,585 | 0.03 | 0 | 0 | 0 |
| Workers' Cause Party | | 50,478 | 0.02 | 0 | 0 | 0 |
| Brazilian Labour Renewal Party | | 39,609 | 0.02 | 0 | 0 | 0 |
| Brazilian Communist Party | | 33,330 | 0.02 | 0 | 0 | 0 |
| Agir | | 23,881 | 0.01 | 0 | 0 | 0 |
| Total | | 207,428,348 | 100.00 | 54 | 81 | 0 |
| Registered voters/turnout | | 154,404,390 | – | | | |

Popular vote
| PL | 28.11% |
| UPB | 14.49% |
| FE Brasil | 13.16% |
| PSOL REDE | 9.07% |
| PSB | 7.14% |
| MDB | 5.73% |
| NOVO | 5.34% |
| PSD | 5.07% |
| Republicanos | 4.30% |
| PDT | 2.60% |
| PODE | 1.91% |
| PSDB Cidadania | 1.44% |

Parliamentary seats
| PL | 35.80% |
| UPB | 13.58% |
| FE Brasil | 11.11% |
| MDB | 9.88% |
| Republicanos | 7.41% |
| PSD | 6.17% |
| PSB | 4.94% |
| NOVO | 3.70% |
| PODE | 2.47% |
| PSDB Cidadania | 2.47% |
| PDT | 1.23% |
| PSOL REDE | 1.23% |

==== Results by federative unit ====
| Federative unit | Seats | PL | MDB | UPB | PT | PSB | Novo | Others |
|---|---|---|---|---|---|---|---|---|
| Acre | 2 | 1 | — | 0 | 0 | 0 | — | 1 |
| Alagoas | 2 | — | 0 | 1 | — | — | — | 1 |
| Amapá | 2 | — | 0 | 0 | 0 | 0 | — | 2 |
| Amazonas | 2 | 0 | 1 | 0 | — | — | — | 1 |
| Bahia | 2 | 0 | — | — | 2 | — | — | 0 |
| Ceará | 2 | 0 | — | 0 | — | 1 | 0 | 1 |
| Espírito Santo | 2 | 0 | 0 | — | 0 | 1 | 0 | 1 |
| Federal District | 2 | 2 | — | — | 0 | — | 0 | 0 |
| Goiás | 2 | 1 | 0 | 1 | — | — | — | 0 |
| Maranhão | 2 | 0 | 0 | 1 | 0 | — | 1 | 0 |
| Mato Grosso | 2 | 1 | 0 | 1 | — | 0 | — | 0 |
| Mato Grosso do Sul | 2 | 2 | — | — | 0 | 0 | 0 | 0 |
| Minas Gerais | 2 | 1 | 0 | 0 | 1 | 0 | 0 | 0 |
| Pará | 2 | 0 | 1 | 1 | — | — | — | 0 |
| Paraíba | 2 | 0 | 1 | — | — | 1 | 0 | 0 |
| Paraná | 2 | 1 | — | — | 0 | — | 1 | 0 |
| Pernambuco | 2 | 0 | — | 0 | 1 | — | 0 | 1 |
| Piauí | 2 | 0 | 1 | 0 | — | — | 0 | 1 |
| Rio de Janeiro | 2 | 2 | — | — | 0 | — | — | 0 |
| Rio Grande do Norte | 2 | 0 | — | 0 | 1 | — | — | 1 |
| Rio Grande do Sul | 2 | 1 | — | — | 0 | 0 | 1 | 0 |
| Rondônia | 2 | 2 | — | 0 | 0 | 0 | — | 0 |
| Roraima | 2 | 1 | 1 | 0 | — | 0 | 0 | 0 |
| Santa Catarina | 2 | 2 | 0 | 0 | 0 | — | — | 0 |
| São Paulo | 2 | 1 | — | 1 | — | 0 | — | 0 |
| Sergipe | 2 | 0 | 1 | 0 | 1 | — | — | 0 |
| Tocantins | 2 | 1 | 1 | 0 | 0 | — | 0 | 0 |
| Total | 54 | 19 | 7 | 6 | 6 | 3 | 3 | 10 |
Source: Superior Electoral Court

== See also ==
- 58th Legislature of the National Congress
