= 2026 Brazilian general election =

- Presidential election
- 4 October 2026 (first round); 25 October 2026 (second round)
- Opinion polls
- Turnout: 78.92% (first round; ▼0.13 pp); 80.78% (second round; ▲1.57 pp)
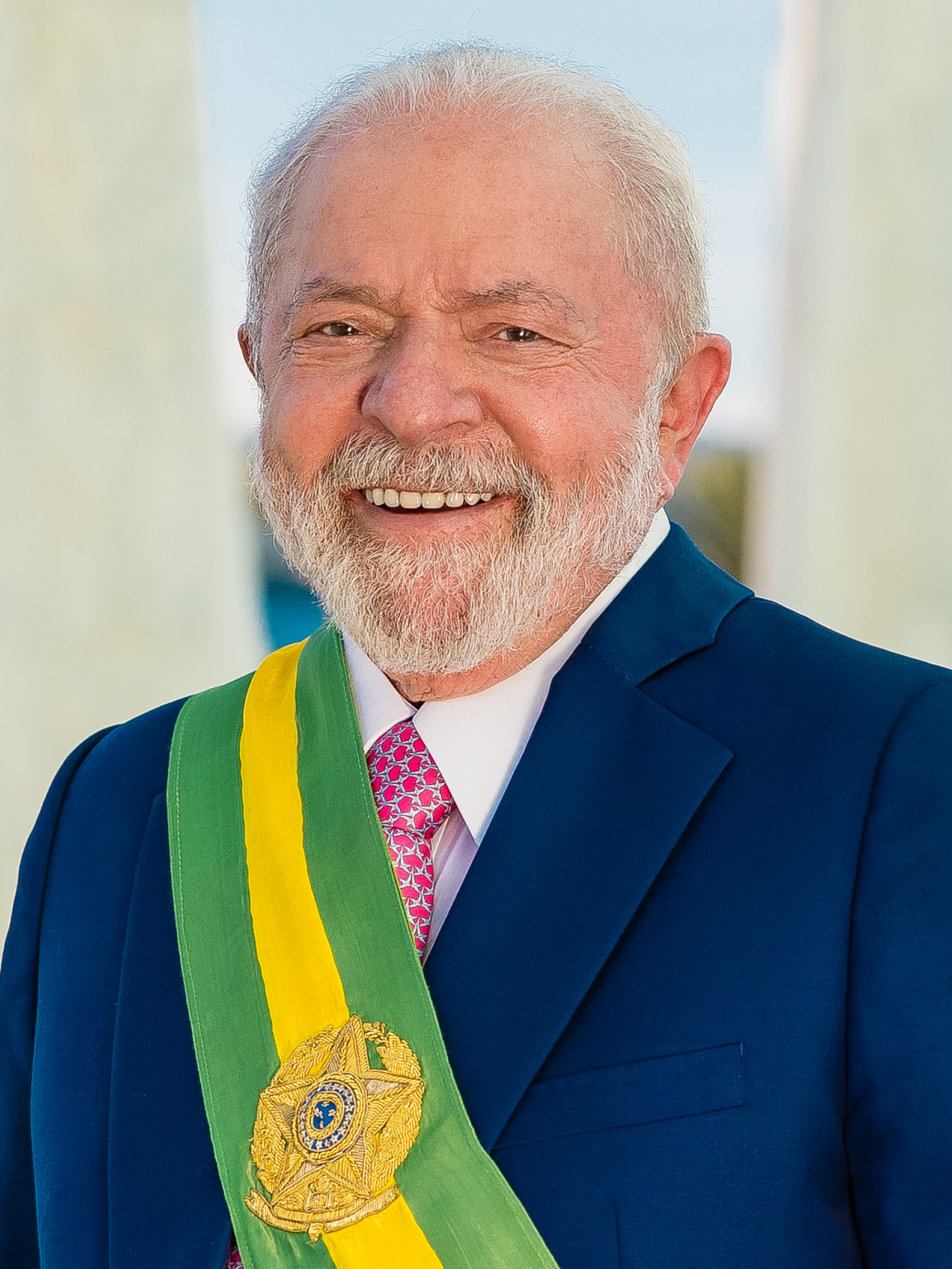

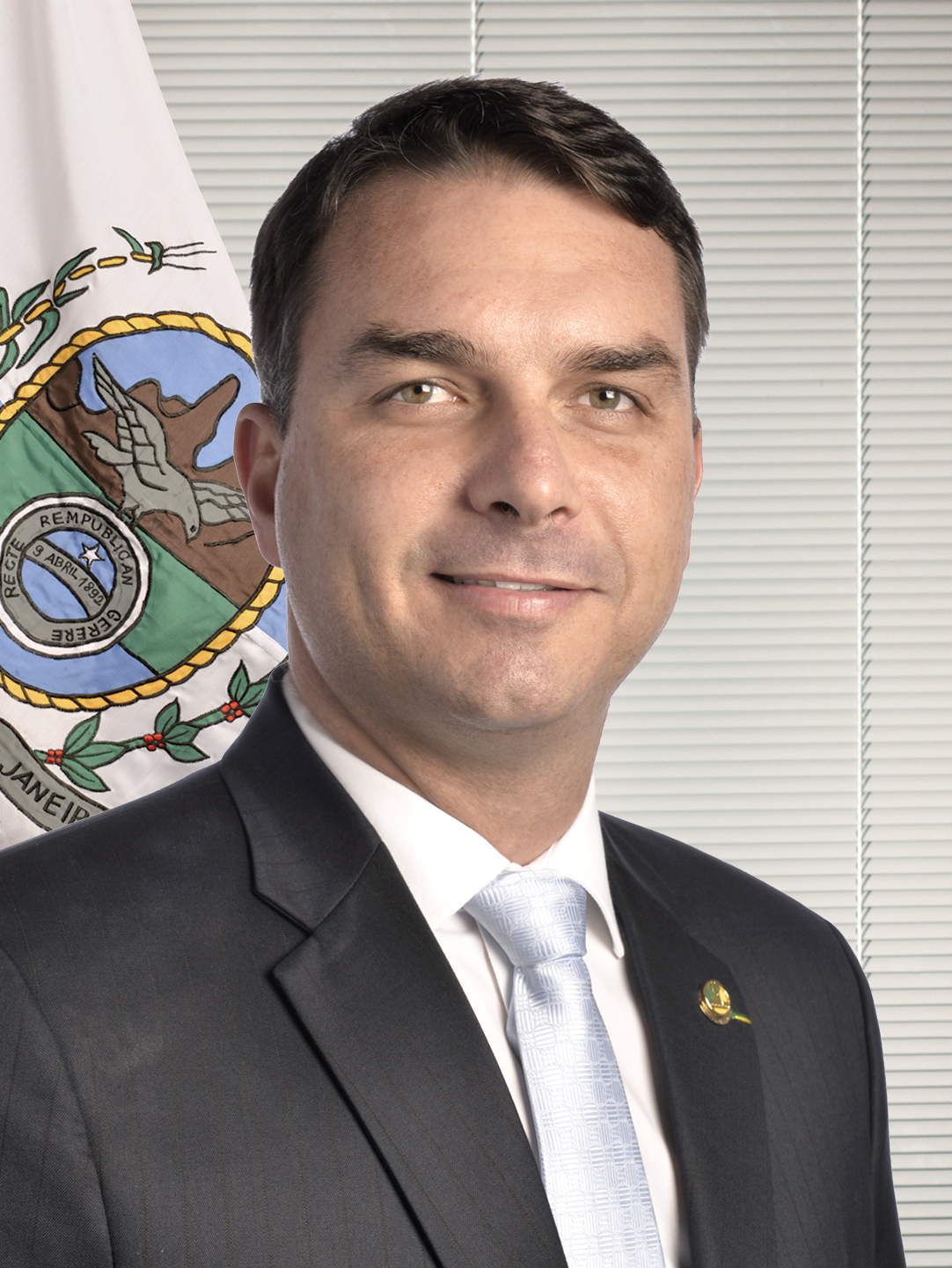
Candidate	Lula da Silva	Flávio Bolsonaro
Party	PT	PL
Alliance	Brazil Ready for More (Note: Lula da Silva received second-round endorsements from Samara Martins of Popular Unity (UP), Hertz Dias of the United Socialist Workers' Party (PSTU), and Edmilson Costa of the Brazilian Communist Party (PCB).)	None (Note: Flávio Bolsonaro received second-round endorsements from Augusto Cury of Avante, Ronaldo Caiado of the Social Democratic Party (PSD), Romeu Zema of the New Party (NOVO), and Clariana Barão of Christian Democracy (DC).)
Running mate	Geraldo Alckmin (PSB)	Alfredo Gaspar
Popular vote	64,256,232	59,826,041
Percentage	51.79%	48.21%
President before election
Luiz Inácio Lula da Silva
PT
Elected President
Luiz Inácio Lula da Silva
PT
- Chamber of Deputies
- 4 October 2026
- All 513 seats in the Chamber of Deputies; 257 seats needed for a majority
Party	Leader	Vote %	Seats	+/–
PL	Sóstenes Cavalcante	22.69	121	+22
FE Brasil	Pedro Uczai	14.81	88	+7
UNIÃO	Moses Rodrigues	13.69	87	−19
PSD	Antonio Brito	8.34	43	+1
Republicanos	Augusto Coutinho	7.10	41	+1
MDB	Isnaldo Bulhões	7.00	36	−6
PODE	Rodrigo Gambale	5.28	27	+9
PSOL-REDE	Tarcísio Motta	4.91	15	+1
PSB	Jonas Donizette	4.44	15	+1
PSDB–Cidadania	Adolfo Viana	2.80	11	−7
NOVO	Gilson Marques	2.58	10	+7
Solidary Renewal	Áureo Ribeiro	1.98	7	−2
PDT	André Figueiredo	1.50	6	−11
Avante	Waldemar Oliveira	1.62	5	−2
Missão	Kim Kataguiri	1.04	1	New
This lists parties that won seats. See the complete results below.
- Federal Senate
- 4 October 2026
- 54 of the 81 seats in the Federal Senate; 41 seats needed for a majority
Party	Leader	Vote %	Seats	+/–
PL	Carlos Portinho	28.11	29	+14
PT	Camilo Santana	13.16	9	0
MDB	Eduardo Braga	5.73	8	−1
PP	Tereza Cristina	10.65	6	−2
Republicanos	Alan Rick	4.30	6	0
UNIÃO	Dorinha Rezende	3.84	5	+2
PSD	Omar Aziz	5.07	5	−9
PSB	Cid Gomes	7.14	4	−2
NOVO		5.34	3	+3
PODE	Alexandre Giordano	1.91	2	−1
PSDB	Plínio Valério	1.34	2	−2
REDE		5.20	1	+1
PDT	Weverton Rocha	2.60	1	−1
This lists parties that won seats. See the complete results below.

General elections were held in Brazil on 4 October 2026 to elect the president, vice president, members of the National Congress, the governors, vice governors and legislative assemblies of all federative units, and the district council of Fernando de Noronha. As no candidate for president (and for governor in some states) received more than half of the valid votes in the first round, a runoff election for these offices was held on 25 October.

== Electoral system ==
Brazil's president and vice president are elected as a joint ticket using the two-round system. The first round of elections is held on the first Sunday of October (in this instance, 4 October 2026). A candidate who receives more than half of the valid votes in the first round is elected.

If this threshold is not met by any candidate, the two candidates with the most votes in the first round advance to a second round of voting, held on the last Sunday of October (in this case, 25 October 2026). The candidate with the most votes in the second round is elected. Elections for governors and vice governors of all 26 states and of the Federal District are held on the same dates and with the same two-round system as the presidential election.

Two-thirds of the 81 members of the Brazilian Senate were up for election in 2026, two senators being elected from each of the states and the Federal District using plurality block voting. The other third of the Senate was elected in 2022.

All 513 members of the Chamber of Deputies (federal deputies) are elected from 27 multi-member constituencies corresponding to the states and the Federal District, varying in size from 8 to 70 seats. All members of the state legislative assemblies (state deputies) and of the Legislative Chamber of the Federal District (district deputies), varying in size from 24 to 94 seats, are also elected. These elections are held using open list, proportional representation, with seats allocated using integer quotients and the D'Hondt method.

All seven members of the District Council of Fernando de Noronha are elected by single non-transferable vote. Unlike elections for other offices in Brazil, candidates for this council are not nominated by political parties.

=== Voters ===
Official 2026 elections logo

Voting in Brazil is allowed for citizens over 16 years of age and mandatory for literate citizens between 18 and 70 years of age, except conscripts, who are not allowed to vote during their period of mandatory military service. Those who are required but do not vote in an election and do not present an acceptable justification, such as being absent from their voting locality at the time, must pay a fine, normally R$3.51, equivalent to about US$0.70 as of 2026. In some cases, the fine may be waived, reduced, or increased by up to 10 times.

Brazilian citizens residing abroad may only vote for president and vice president. Under the Equality Statute between Brazil and Portugal, Portuguese citizens legally residing in Brazil for more than three years may also register to vote in Brazilian elections.

About 158.7 million people were eligible to vote in the 2026 Brazilian elections.

=== Candidates and political parties ===
All candidates for federal, state, Federal District, and municipal offices must be nominated by a political party. For offices to be elected by majority or plurality (executive offices and senators), parties may form an electoral coalition (coligação) to nominate a single candidate. The coalitions do not need to be composed of the same parties for every nomination, do not need to be maintained after the election, and are not valid for offices to be elected proportionally (deputies and aldermen).

Parties may also form a different type of alliance called federation (federação), which acts as a single party to nominate candidates for all offices in all locations, including those to be elected proportionally, and must be maintained with a single leadership structure over the course of the elected legislature. Federations may also act as parties to form coalitions. For the 2026 election, the registered federations are Brazil of Hope (PT–PCdoB–PV), Always Forward (PSDB–Cidadania), PSOL REDE Federation (PSOL–REDE), Solidary Renewal (PRD–Solidarity), and Progressive Union (Union–PP).

For offices to be elected proportionally, each party must nominate candidates of each sex in a distribution between 30 and 70%. Parties must also allocate their funds and broadcast time proportionally to the number of their candidates of each sex and race, with a minimum of 30% of funds for Black and Brown candidates.

=== Procedure ===
Brazil Countries with voting stations for Brazilian citizens abroad

Voting in Brazilian elections can only be done in person and only on election day, which is always a Sunday. There is no provision for postal or early voting. Voter registration must be done in advance, and each voter can only vote in one designated voting station, either based on the voter's registered domicile or at a different location that the voter must specifically request if planning to be there temporarily on election day. Voters must provide photo identification at their voting station before proceeding to vote.

About 95,000 voting stations were installed in all municipalities of Brazil, the Federal District, and Fernando de Noronha. Most voting stations are in public schools. In some sparsely populated areas, such as indigenous territories, the installation and use of voting stations requires extensive travel and logistics. Voting stations were also installed in 164 locations in other countries, mostly in Brazilian diplomatic missions, for citizens residing abroad.

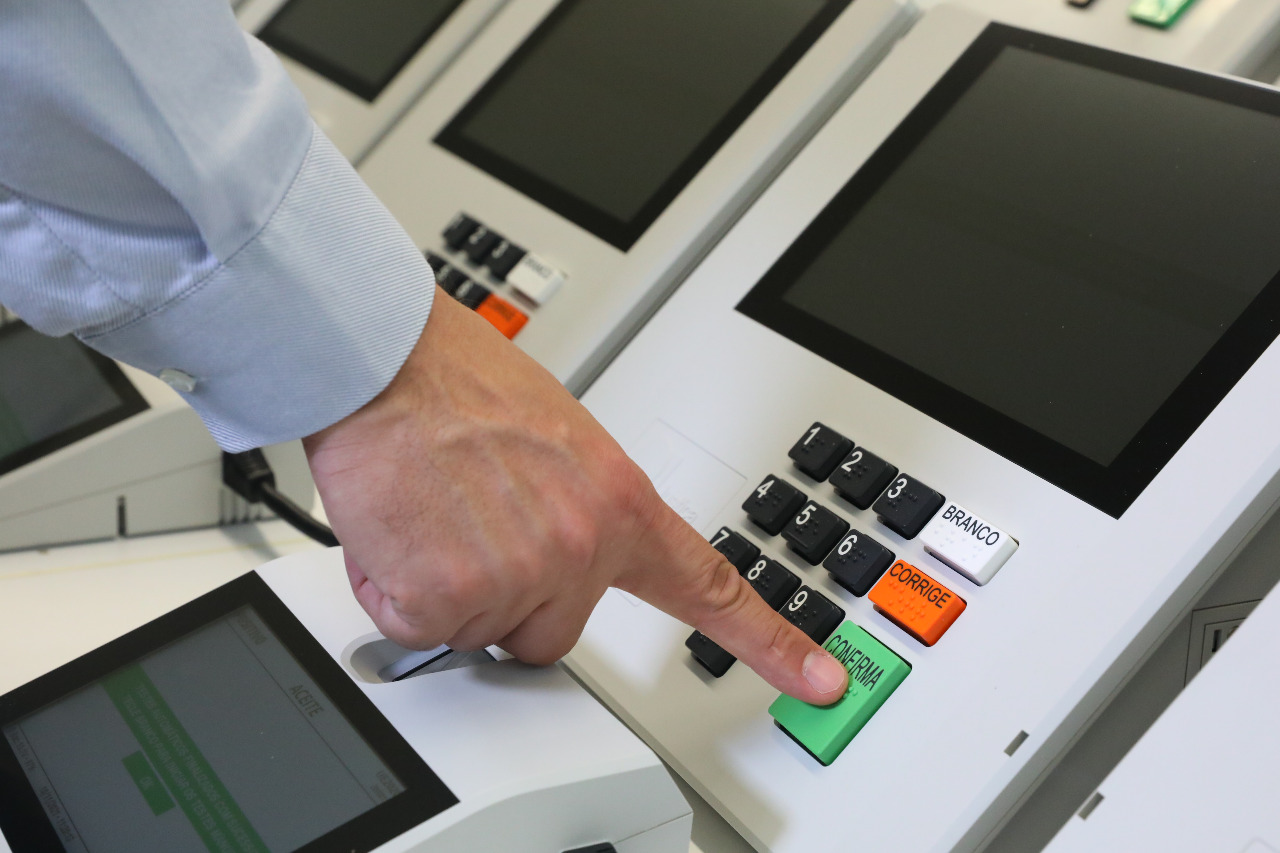
Brazilian voting machines

Voting is done almost entirely on direct-recording electronic voting machines, designed for extreme simplicity. The voter dials a number corresponding to the desired candidate or party, causing the name and photo of the candidate or party to appear on the screen, then the voter presses a green button to confirm or an orange button to correct and try again. It is also possible to leave the vote blank by pressing a white button, or to nullify the vote by dialing a number that does not correspond to any candidate or party. Paper ballots are only used in case a voting machine malfunctions or in locations abroad with fewer than 100 voters.

The electronic system is subject to extensive tests, including on machines randomly selected from actual voting stations on election day, witnessed by political parties to rule out fraud. After voting ends, every machine prints a record of its total votes for each candidate or party, which is publicly displayed for comparison with the results published electronically. The system delivers the complete election results usually a few hours after voting ends, which is extremely fast for such a large population as Brazil. However, the system does not create a physical record of individual votes to allow a full recount.

Voting stations operate at the same time in the whole country, regardless of their time zone: 9:00 to 18:00 UTC−02:00, 8:00 to 17:00 UTC−03:00, 7:00 to 16:00 UTC−04:00, and 6:00 to 15:00 UTC−05:00. The unified voting time does not apply to voting stations for citizens abroad, which operate from 8:00 to 17:00 local time, ranging from 16 hours before to 4 hours after those in Brazil.

=== Administration ===
Unusual in the world, Brazilian elections are administered by the judiciary. Brazil has one Superior Electoral Court (Tribunal Superior Eleitoral, TSE), and each state and the Federal District have a Regional Electoral Court (Tribunal Regional Eleitoral, TRE), all headed by judges selected from other courts. The electoral courts register voters and candidates, install voting machines, count votes, publish the results, issue regulations, monitor compliance and rule on disputes and potential violations of electoral law.

== Presidential election ==
On 4 October 2026, an election was held as a part of the 2026 Brazilian general election to elect the president and vice president of the Federal Republic of Brazil. The election, mainly contested between incumbent president, Luiz Inácio Lula da Silva and Flávio Bolsonaro came after 4 years of investigation into Bolsonaro's father, Jair Bolsonaro due to his involvement in the 2022–2023 Brazilian coup plot.

In the first round, senator Flávio Bolsonaro of the state of Rio de Janeiro, the eldest son of former president Jair Bolsonaro, led with 47% of the vote over incumbent president Luiz Inácio Lula da Silva's 45%. In the second round, Lula overcame his first-round loss and was re-elected in an upset victory to a fourth non-consecutive term as president, outperforming his 2022 result. It was the first instance of a Brazilian presidential election in which the winner of the first round was defeated in the runoff.

== Gubernatorial elections ==
Gubernatorial elections were held in Brazil on 4 October 2026 as part of the nationwide general elections to elect tickets with state governors and their vice governors (as well as the governor of the Federal District and their vice governor). A second round was held on 25 October 2026 for states where no candidate was able to secure more than half of the votes in the first round.

== Legislative elections ==
Legislative elections were held in Brazil on 4 October 2026 as part of the nationwide general elections to elect members of the National Congress. Although the Worker's Party candidate, incumbent president Lula da Silva won a fourth term in office, the Liberal Party won pluralities in both the Federal Senate and the Chamber of Deputies. The result of the legislative elections compared to the presidential elections, marked what has been described as the result of increasing hostility towards Lula.

== See also ==
- List of elections in 2026
