= Giordanna Mano =

Brazilian politician (born 1985)

Member-elect of the Chamber of Deputies
- Assuming office 1 February 2027
- Constituency: Ceará

Personal details
- Born: Giordanna Silva Braga; 14 October 1985 (age 41) Fortaleza, Ceará, Brazil
- Party: PRD
- Spouse: Júnior Mano (m. 2018)
- Profession: Lawyer

Giordanna Silva Braga Mano (née Silva Braga, born 14 October 1985) is a Brazilian politician who was elected member of the Chamber of Deputies in 2026. From 2021 to 2026, she served as mayor of Nova Russas. She is married to Júnior Mano.
