= List of people from Alagoas =

The people who are born in the Brazilian State of Alagoas are called Alagoanos in Portuguese. Notable people born in the State of Alagoas include:

== Entrepreneurs and industrialists ==
- Antônio Guedes Muniz – Engineer and pioneer of the Brazilian aviation industry.
- Delmiro Augusto da Cruz Gouveia – Versatile and promising businessman from Alagoas, assassinated by gunshot in 1917. He was so famous that he ended up bothering the gigantic monopoly of the Coats Group and his name, currently names a city in the state of Alagoas (Delmiro Gouveia City).

== Filmmakers and actors ==
- Cacá Diegues – Film director and screenwriter member of the Brazilian "Cinema Novo movement", In 2018, Diegues was elected to the Brazilian Academy of Letters.
- Celso Brandão – Photographer and director of documentaries.
- Joffre Soares – Film actor, he appeared in 100 films between 1963 and 1996.

== Scientists and technician ==
- Manfredo do Carmo – Mathematician. He spent most of his career at IMPA and is seen as the doyen of differential geometry in Brazil.
- Elon Lages Lima – Mathematician whose research concerned differential topology, algebraic topology, and differential geometry. Lima was an influential figure in the development of mathematics in Brazil.

== Sportists and athletes ==
- Ulisses dos Santos – Hurdler at the 1956 Summer Olympics.
- Mário Zagallo – Football player and famous manager.
- Roberto Firmino – Liverpool FC football player.
- Marta (Marta Vieira da Silva) – Women's world famous soccer football striker.
- Reinaldo Alagoano – Soccer Footballer.
- Fabrício Bigode – Soccer Footballer.
- Didira – Soccer Footballer.
- Nélson de Jesus Silva, better known simply as "Dida" – Former footballer who played as a goalkeeper. At international level, Dida earned 91 caps in eleven years with the Brazil national team, winning the FIFA World Cup and an Olympic medal, while he is the most successful player in the history of the FIFA Confederations Cup. He notably broke a color barrier during the 1999 Copa América by being the Seleção's first Afro-Brazilian starting goalkeeper since Moacyr Barbosa half a century earlier, and, in 2006, became the first black goalkeeper to start for Brazil in a FIFA World Cup finals tournament since 1950.
- Iomar do Nascimento, known as "Mazinho" – Former footballer and football manager
- Geyse da Silva Ferreira – Commonly known as Geyse and previously Pretinha, is a Brazilian professional footballer who plays as a forward for Primera División club Barcelona and the Brazil women's national team.
- Júnior Viçosa – Soccer Footballer.
- Élton Arábia – Soccer Footballer.
- Edna Veiga – Retired Brazilian female volleyball player, she was part of the Brazil women's national volleyball team at the 1994 FIVB Volleyball Women's World Championship in Brazil.
- Sandra Suruagy – Retired volleyball player from Brazil, who represented her native country at the 1996 Summer Olympics in Atlanta, Georgia. There she claimed the bronze medal with the Women's National Team. She also competed at the 1984 Summer Olympics and the 1988 Summer Olympics.
- Roseane Santos – Paralympic athlete from Brazil competing mainly in category F58 throwing events.
- Bruna Farias – Brazilian Olympic sprinter. She represented Brazil at the 2016 Summer Olympics as part of the track and field women's 4x100m relay.
- Mário Sérgio Santos Costa – Soccer Footballer.
- Bruno de Barros – Sprinter who is specializes in the 200 metres.
- Yohansson Nascimento – Athlete and Paralympian from Brazil competing mainly in T45/46 sprint events. He was born without both his hands, and is classified T46.
- Maurício Borges Silva – Professional volleyball player, a former member of the Brazil national team. He is the 2016 Olympic Champion, a silver medallist at the 2014 World Championship, 2019 World Cup winner, and a two–time South American Champion (2013, 2017).
- Tiago Fernandes – Former male tennis player coached by Larri Passos. He achieved the No. 1 ranking on the ITF Junior Circuit and won the Boys' Singles division of the 2010 Australian Open, defeating Sean Berman of Australia in the final, 7–5, 6–3.
- José Pereira or Zé Pereira – Professional male tennis player.
- Ana Lima – Retired female volleyball player. She was part of the Brazil women's national volleyball team and participated in the 1994 FIVB Volleyball Women's World Championship.
- Jonathan de Souza Santos – Paralympian athlete from the city of Maceió (Alagoas) competing mainly in F41 classification throwing events.
- Adailma Aparecida da Silva dos Santos known as "Duda Santos" – Professional footballer who plays as a midfielder for Palmeiras.
- Maria Eduarda Arakaki or "Duda" Araki – Rhythmic gymnast. She represented Brazil at the 2018 Summer Youth Olympics and competed in the individual all-around, and she represented Brazil at the 2020 Summer Olympics in the group all-around.
- Marily dos Santos – Marathon runner that was the 2012 winner at the Maratona di Sant'Antonio in Italy.

== Religious ==
- José Palmeira Lessa – Prelate of the Roman Catholic Church.
- Avelar Brandão Vilela – Cardinal of the Roman Catholic Church.
- Waldyr Calheiros Novaes – Prelate of the Catholic Church.
- Fernando Iório Rodrigues – Roman Catholic prelate and professor.
- Henrique Soares da Costa – Roman Catholic bishop.

== Socio-cultural personalities ==
- Francisco – A black man slave that was last person to be officially tried, sentenced to death and executed in Brazil history.
- Domingos Fernandes Calabar – Murdered Portuguese soldier, smuggler, and plantation owner during the time of the Netherlands occupation into Brazil.
- Paulo de Mello Bastos – Aeronaut pilot, trade unionist whose resignation in 1963 inspired a general strike in Brazil.

== Intellectuals ==
- Arthur Ramos – Psychiatrist, social psychologist, ethnologist, folklorist, Brazilian anthropologist and considered the father of Brazilian anthropology.
- Nise da Silveira – Psychiatrist and social reformer.
- Anilda Leão (1923–2012) – Poet, writer, feminist, actress and singer.
- Aurélio Buarque de Holanda Ferreira – Lexicographer, philologist, translator, and writer of brazilian portuguese.
- Francisco Cavalcanti Pontes de Miranda – Prominent jurist, judge, diplomat and professor of Law. He occupied the 7th chair of the Brazilian Academy of Letters.

== Politicians ==
- Deodoro da Fonseca (1827–1892) – First president of the First Brazilian Republic (Old Republic of Brazil), 1889–1891.
- Floriano Peixoto – Second president of the First Brazilian Republic (Old Republic of Brazil), 1891–1894.
- Heloísa Helena – Politician, feminist and ambientalist.
- Renan Calheiros – PMDB Politician and former president of the Senate of Brazil.
- Renan Filho – Former governor of Alagoas, son of the previous president of the Senate, Renan Calheiros, and actually Minister of Transport of Brazil.
- Marx Beltrão – Former Minister of Tourism of Brazil.
- Renilde Bulhões – Senator and physician.
- Aldo Rebelo – Influent former left politician that is former Minister of Institutional Affairs, former President of the Chamber of Deputies, former Chief of Staff to the Governor of São Paulo, former Minister of Defence, former Minister of Science, Technology and Innovations, former Minister of Sports.
- Teotonio Vilela Filho – Former senator and governor of the brazilian state of Alagoas.
- Augusto Farias – Brother of the murdered businessman Paulo Cesar Farias, who was the campaign treasurer of former Brazilian President Fernando Collor de Mello.
- Eurídice Moreira – Eurídice, better known as Dona Dida, was a politician and professor from the state of Alagoas who represented the state of Paraíba.
- Sóstenes Cavalcante – Politician and pastor. Although born in Alagoas, he has spent his political career representing Rio de Janeiro (state), actually is Member of the Chamber of Deputies of Brazil.
- Fernando Collor de Mello – Brazilian politician who was born into a political family of the brazilian state of Alagoas of German origin and served as the 32nd president of Brazil from 1990 to 1992, when he resigned in a failed attempt to stop his impeachment trial by the Brazilian Senate. Collor was the first President democratically elected after the end of the Brazilian military dictatorship. He became the youngest president in Brazilian history, taking office at the age of 40. After he resigned from the presidency, the impeachment trial on charges of corruption continued. Collor was found guilty by the Senate and disqualified from holding elected office for eight years (1992–2000). He was later acquitted of ordinary criminal charges in his judicial trial before Brazil's Supreme Federal Court, for lack of valid evidence.
- Pedro Collor de Mello – brother of former Brazilian president Fernando Collor. Working for the Collor family's newspaper Gazeta de Alagoas, Pedro Collor gained prominence when he made a series of accusations against his brother, who was then president. The allegations include corruption, and drug use. Pedro Collor's revelations helped precipitate his brother's downfall in 1992. Pedro Collor died of brain cancer in 1994.
- Maurício Quintella Lessa – Lawyer and former Minister of Transports, Ports and Civil Aviation of Brazil.
- João Henrique Caldas – Actually Mayor of capital of Alagoas Maceió.
- Paulo Dantas – Actually Governor of the brazilian state of Alagoas.
- Arthur Lira – President of the Chamber of Deputies of Brazil since February 2021 and lawyer, farmer, entrepreneur.

== Writers ==
- Jorge de Lima – Poet and writer.
- Graciliano Ramos – Mundial famous Writer and social critic.
- Guimarães Passos – Journalist and poet.
- Lêdo Ivo – Poet, novelist, essayist and journalist. He was member of the Brazilian Academy of Letters.

== Musicians ==
- Djavan – Singer/songwriter.
- Hermeto Pascoal – Composer and multi-instrumentalist.

== Models ==
- Bruna Tenório – Top Model.
