= Júnior Mano =

Brazilian politician (born 1985)

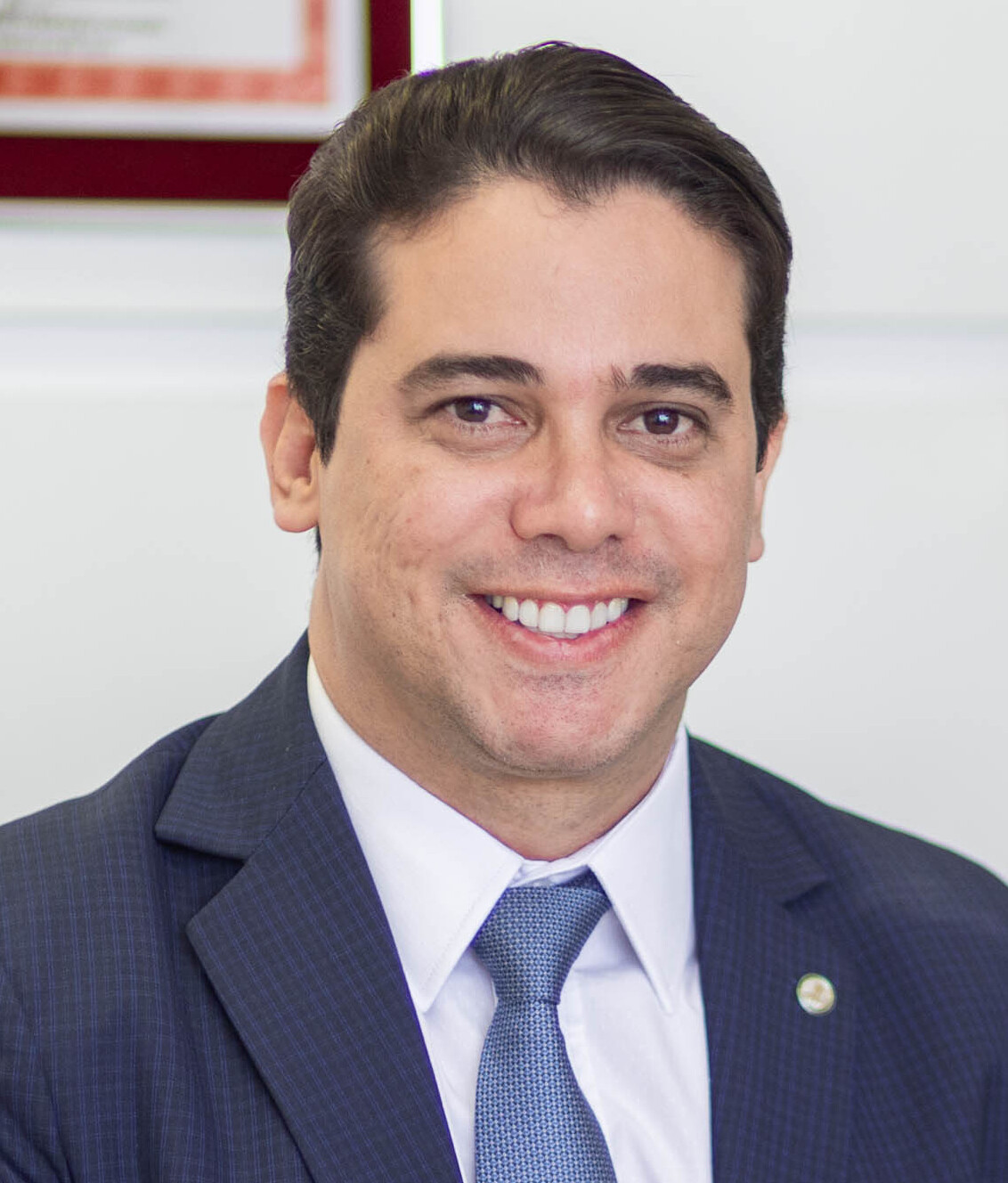
- Mano in 2025

Member of the Chamber of Deputies
- Incumbent
- Assumed office 1 February 2019
- Constituency: Ceará

Personal details
- Born: 16 April 1985 (age 41)
- Party: Brazilian Socialist Party (since 2024)
- Spouse: Giordanna Mano (m. 2018)

Antônio Luiz Rodrigues Mano Júnior, better known as Júnior Mano (born 16 April 1985), is a Brazilian politician serving as a member of the Chamber of Deputies since 2019. From 2017 to 2018, he served as deputy mayor of Nova Russas.

He was excluded from Partido Liberal on the demand of Jair Bolsonaro in July 2025 as he is under suspicion of corruption.
