= Leão (disambiguation) =

Leão (Portuguese for lion) may refer to:

== People ==
- André Leão (born 1985), Portuguese footballer
- Anilda Leão (1923–2012), Brazilian poet, writer, actress and singer
- Aristides Leão (1914–1993), Brazilian biologist and scientist
- Augusto Pinto Duarte Maia (born 1971), Portuguese footballer known as Leão
- Celina Leão (born 1977), Brazilian business administrator and politician
- Chris Leão (born 1994), Brazilian TV celebrity, DJ and musical producer
- Danuza Leão (1933–2022), Brazilian model, socialite, journalist, writer and actress
- Émerson Leão (born 1949), Brazilian football player and manager
- Eriberto Leão (born 1972), Brazilian actor
- Honório Hermeto Carneiro Leão, Marquis of Paraná (1801–1856), Brazilian politician, diplomat, judge and monarchist
- Leão Lopes (born 1948), Cape Verdean director, writer, plastic artist and professor
- Mara Ferreira Leão (born 1991), Brazilian volleyball player
- Nara Leão (1942–1989), Brazilian singer and actress
- Rafael Leão (born 1999), Portuguese footballer
- Ricardo Leão (born 1975), Portuguese politician
- Rodrigo Leão (musician) (born 1964), Portuguese musician and songwriter
- Rodrigo Leão (volleyball) (born 1996), Brazilian indoor volleyball player

== Other uses ==
- Leao (band), a New Zealand music group
- "Leão" (Marília Mendonça song), a song by Xamã and Marília Mendonça
- Leão River, a river in Santa Catarina, Brazil
- Leão River (Rio Grande do Sul), a river in Rio Grande do Sul, Brazil
- Matte Leão, a Brazilian infusion and tea brand
