= Paulinho da Força =

Brazilian politician (born 1956)

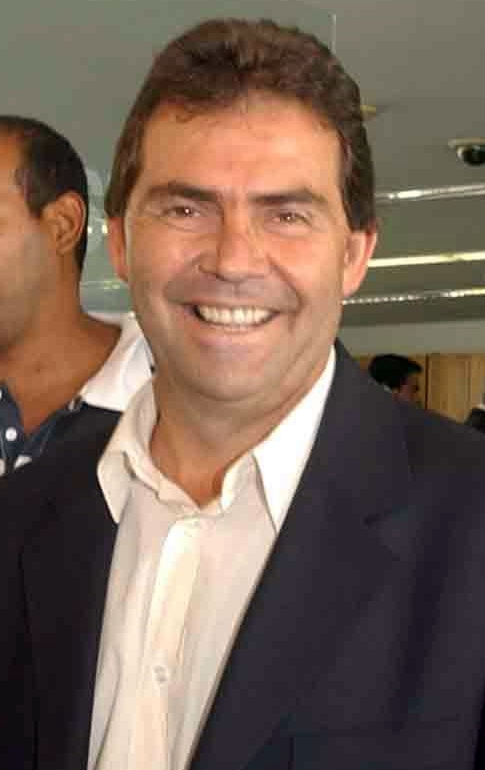

Member of the Chamber of Deputies
- Incumbent
- Assumed office 30 November 2023
- Constituency: São Paulo
- In office 1 February 2007 – 5 June 2020 (Note: Silva was removed from the Chamber by the Supreme Federal Court and had his political rights suspended for five years.)
- Constituency: São Paulo

Solidariedade National Vice President
- Incumbent
- Assumed office 8 November 2022
- Preceded by: Jefferson Coriteac

Solidariedade National President
- In office 5 October 2013 – 8 November 2022
- Preceded by: Marcílio Duarte
- Succeeded by: Eurípeder Júnior

Personal details
- Born: Paulo Pereira da Silva; 25 January 1956 (age 70) Porecatu, Paraná, Brazil
- Party: Solidariedade (since 2013)
- Other political affiliations: PT (1984–1996); PTB (1996–2003); PDT (2003–2013)
- Occupation: Trade unionist

Paulo Pereira da Silva, better known as Paulinho da Força (born 24 February 1956) is a Brazilian metallurgist and politician. He had served as federal deputy from 2007 to 2020, until he had his mandate repealed and political rights suspended by the Supreme Federal Court in June 2020. Pereira is a member of Solidariedade.

== Notes ==
Trade union offices
Preceded by Luiz Antônio Medeiros	Chairman of Força Sindical; 1999–2021	Succeeded by Miguel Torres
Party political offices
Preceded by Marcílio Duarte	Solidariedade National President; 2013–2022	Succeeded by Eurípedes Júnior
Preceded by Jefferson Coriteac	Solidariedade National Vice President; 2022–present	Incumbent
