= Waldemar Oliveira =

Waldemar Oliveira may refer to:

- Waldemar de Oliveira, Brazilian boxer
- Waldemar Oliveira (politician), Brazilian politician
