= Eduardo da Fonte =

Brazilian politician (born 1972)

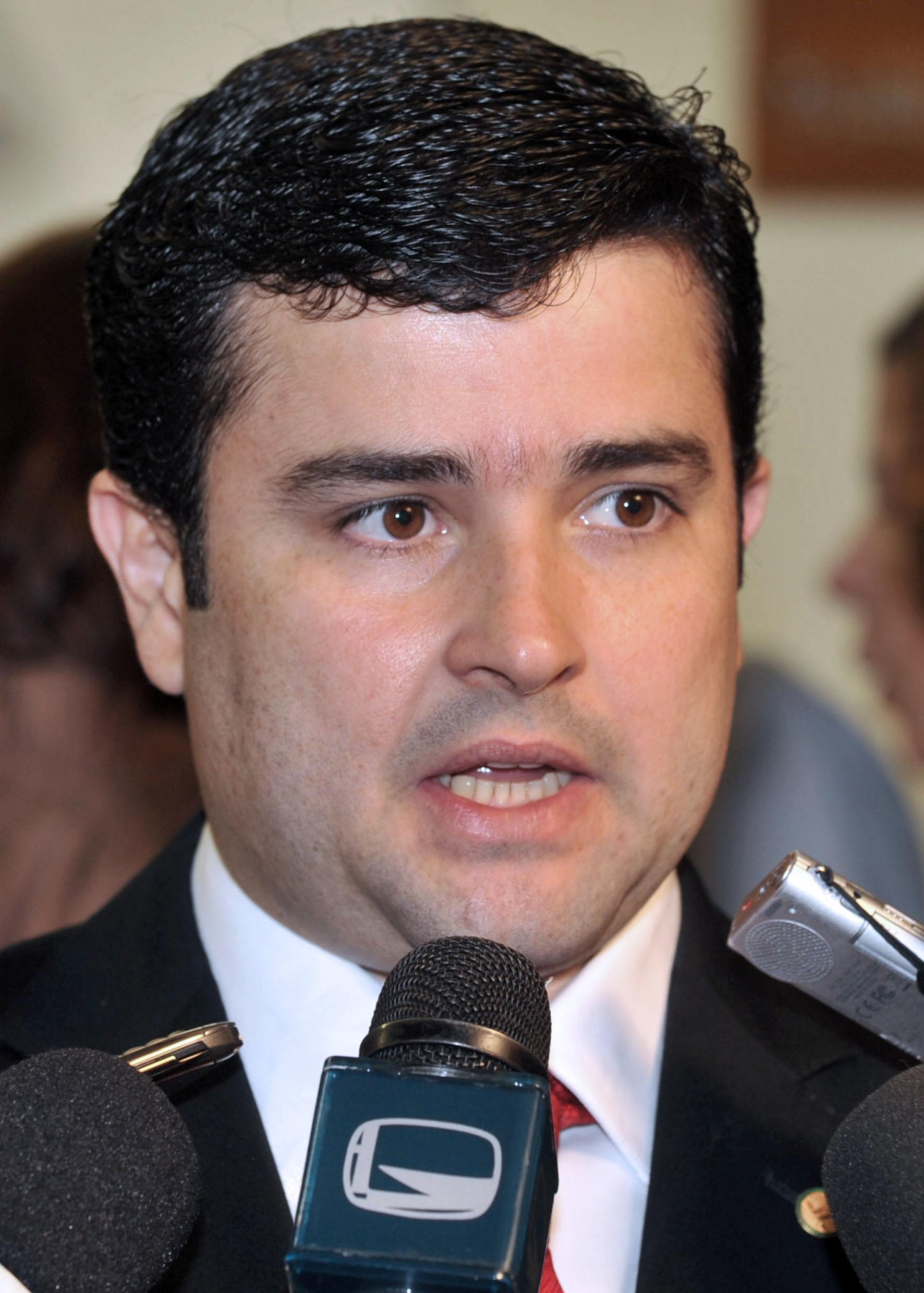

Member of the Chamber of Deputies
- Incumbent
- Assumed office 1 February 2007
- Constituency: Pernambuco

Personal details
- Born: 17 October 1972 (age 53)
- Party: Progressistas (since 2003)
- Children: Lula da Fonte

Eduardo Henrique da Fonte de Albuquerque Silva (born 17 October 1972) is a Brazilian politician serving as a member of the Chamber of Deputies since 2007. He is the father of Lula da Fonte.
