= Sóstenes =

Sóstenes is Spanish and Portuguese for Sosthenes. It may refer to:

- Sóstenes Cavalcante (b. 1975), Brazilian politician and pastor
- Sóstenes Lins (b. 1952), Brazilian mathematician
- Sóstenes Rocha (1831–1897), Mexican general, politician, and writer

== See also ==
- La guerra de los sostenes (The War of the Bras), 1976 Argentine comedy film
