= Giovani Cherini =

Brazilian politician (born 1960)

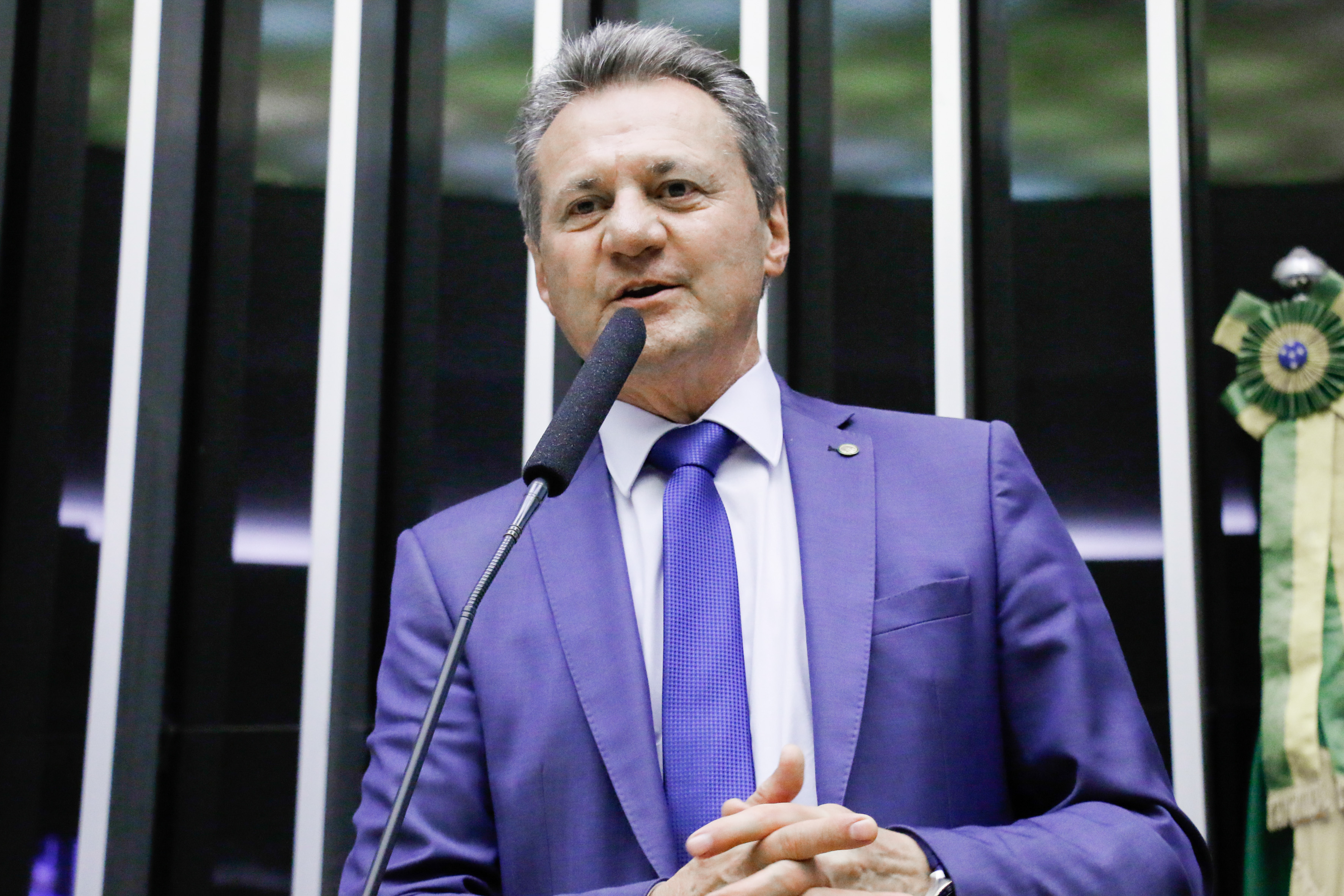
- Cherini in 2023

Member of the Chamber of Deputies
- Incumbent
- Assumed office 1 February 2011
- Constituency: Rio Grande do Sul

Member of the Legislative Assembly of Rio Grande do Sul
- In office 1 February 1995 – 1 February 2011
- Constituency: At-large

Personal details
- Born: 23 June 1960 (age 66) Soledade, Rio Grande do Sul, Brazil
- Party: PL (since 2016)
- Other political affiliations: PDT (1988–2016)

Giovani Cherini (born 23 June 1960) is a Brazilian politician serving as a member of the Chamber of Deputies since 2011. From 1995 to 2011, he was a member of the Legislative Assembly of Rio Grande do Sul. From 2010 to 2011, he served as president of the assembly.
