= Cabo Gilberto Silva =

Brazilian politician (born 1981)

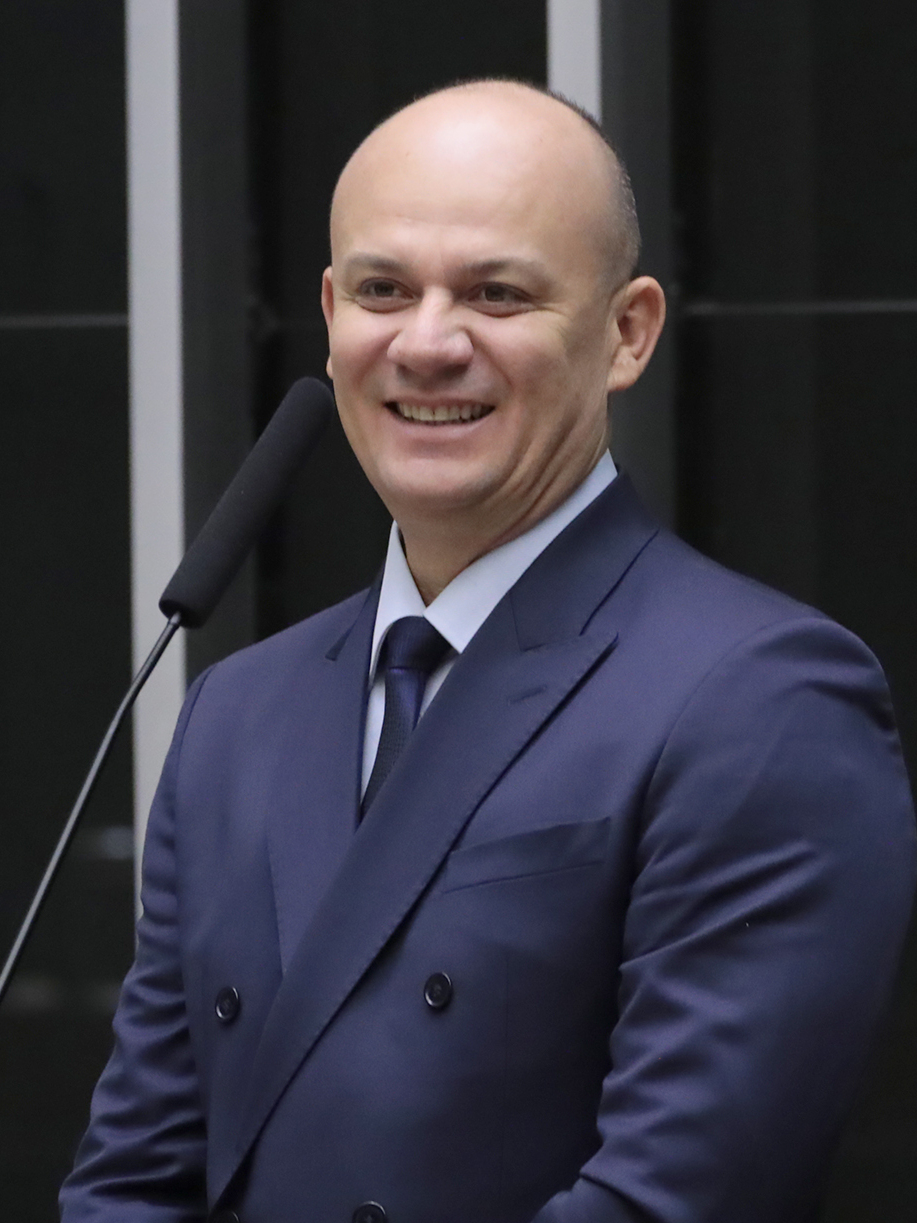
- Silva in 2025

Member of the Chamber of Deputies
- Incumbent
- Assumed office 1 February 2023
- Constituency: Paraíba

Member of the Legislative Assembly of Paraíba
- In office 1 February 2019 – 1 February 2023
- Constituency: At-large

Personal details
- Born: Gilberto Gomes da Silva; 1 April 1981 (age 45) Santa Rita, Paraíba, Brazil
- Party: PL (since 2022)
- Other political affiliations: PROS (2014–2016); PRB (2016–2018); PSL (2018–2022); UNIÃO (2022)
- Profession: Military police officer

Military service
- Allegiance: Military Police of Paraíba State
- Rank: Corporal

Gilberto Gomes da Silva (born 1 April 1981), better known as Cabo Gilberto Silva, is a Brazilian politician serving as a federal deputy in the Chamber of Deputies since 2023.

From 2019 to 2023, he was a member of the Legislative Assembly of Paraíba.
