= Renilde Bulhões =

Brazilian physician and politician

- Official portrait

Senator for Alagoas
- In office 3 April 2019 – 1 August 2019

Mayor of Santana do Ipanema
- In office 1 January 2005 – 31 December 2012

Personal details
- Born: March 30, 1947 (age 79) Santana do Ipanema, Alagoas
- Party: PROS (since 2019)
- Spouse: Isnaldo Bulhões
- Children: Isnaldo Bulhões
- Profession: Obstetrician

Renilde Silva Bulhões Barros (born 30 March 1947) is a Brazilian physician and politician who is currently a Senator for the state of Alagoas. She took office on 3 April 2019 after Fernando Collor de Mello took a 120-day leave. Before being elected, she was mayor of Santana do Ipanema from 2005 to 2012.

She is married to Isnaldo Bulhões, the current mayor of Santana do Ipanema, and was his Secretary of Government before taking office as Senator.
