= Joaquim Passarinho =

Brazilian politician and architect

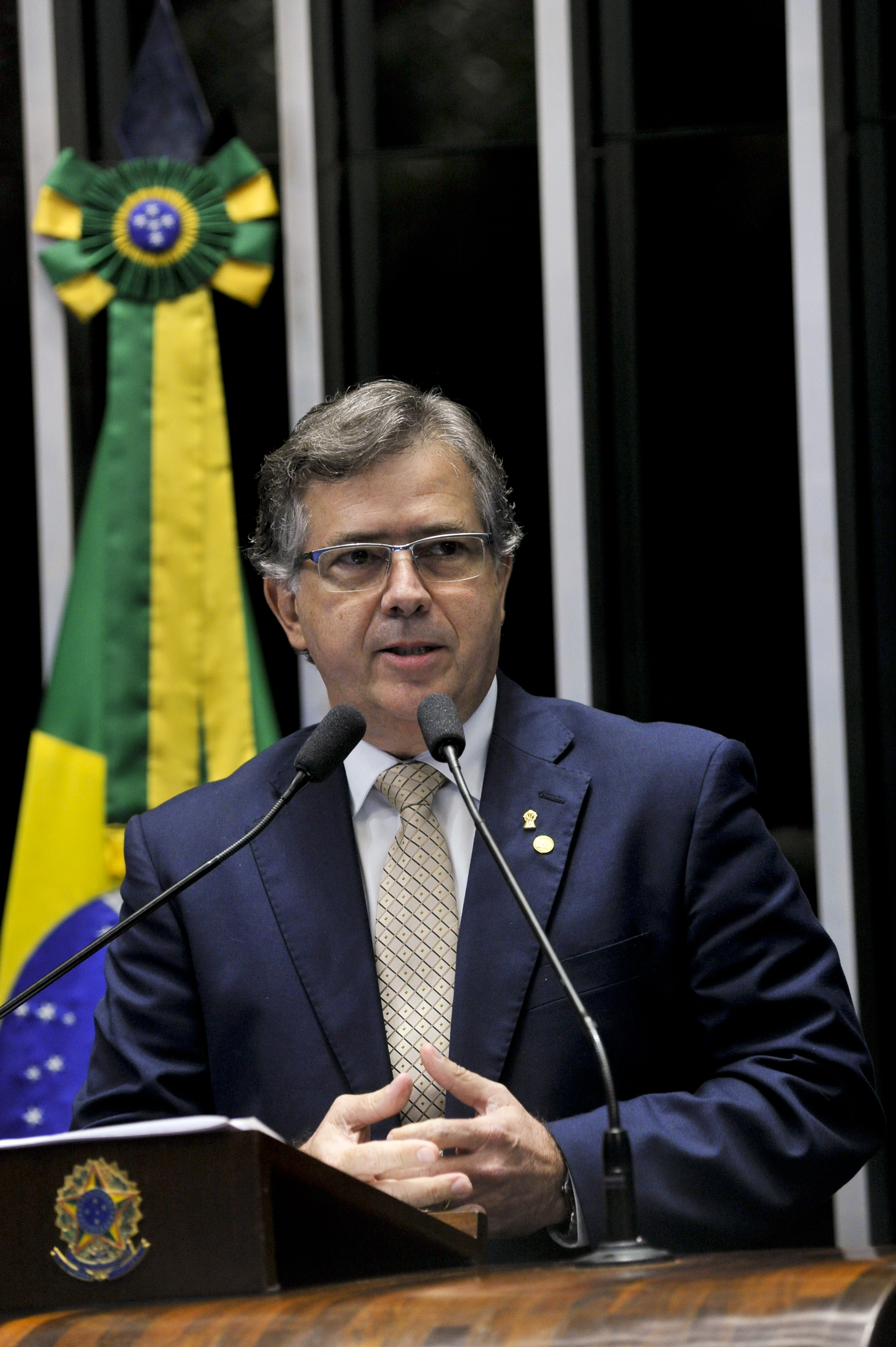
- Passarinho in October 2016

Federal Deputy for Pará
- Incumbent
- Assumed office 1 February 2015

Secretary of State for Public Works of Pará
- In office 2011–2014

State representative for Pará
- In office 2003–3010

Secretary of State for Public Works of Pará
- In office 2002–2003

City Councilor for Belém
- In office 1989–2002

Personal details
- Born: 2 December 1961 (age 64) Belém, Pará, Brazil
- Party: PL

Joaquim Passarinho Pinto de Souza Porto (born 2 December 1961) is a Brazilian politician and architect. Born in Belém, he has served in the state council, as well as state representative since 2015 for Pará.

== Personal life ==
Passarinho studied architecture at university. He is a practicing Roman Catholic. He is the nephew of former senator and governor of Pará, Jarbas Passarinho.

== Political career ==
Passarinho served on the city council of Belém, as well as serving in the state senate and having two separate stints of being Secretary of State for Public Works for the state of Pará, prior to being elected federal deputy.

Passarinho voted in favor of the impeachment against then-president Dilma Rousseff and political reformation. He would vote in favor of a similar corruption investigation into Rousseff's successor Michel Temer. Passarinho voted in favor of the 2017 Brazil labor reform.
