= Bruno Farias (politician) =

Brazilian politician (born 1982)

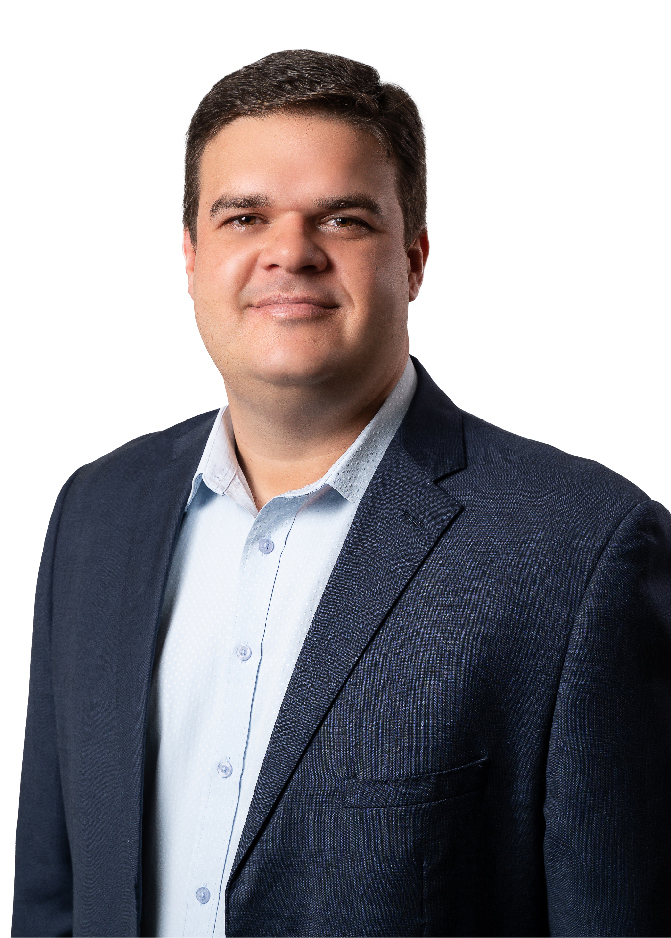
- Farias in 2022

Member of the Chamber of Deputies
- Incumbent
- Assumed office 1 February 2023
- Constituency: Minas Gerais

Personal details
- Born: 13 October 1982 (age 43)
- Party: Avante (since 2022)

Bruno Souza Farias (born 13 October 1982) is a Brazilian politician serving as a member of the Chamber of Deputies since 2023. He is the president of the Regional Nursing Council of Minas Gerais.
