= Lula da Fonte =

Brazilian politician (born 2000)

Member of the Chamber of Deputies
- Incumbent
- Assumed office 1 February 2023
- Constituency: Pernambuco

Personal details
- Born: 8 December 2000 (age 25)
- Party: Progressistas (since 2018)
- Parent: Eduardo da Fonte (father)

Luiz Eduardo de Queiroz Campos da Fonte Albuquerque (born 8 December 2000) is a Brazilian politician serving as a member of the Chamber of Deputies since 2023. He is the son of Eduardo da Fonte.
