= Luiz Nishimori =

Brazilian politician

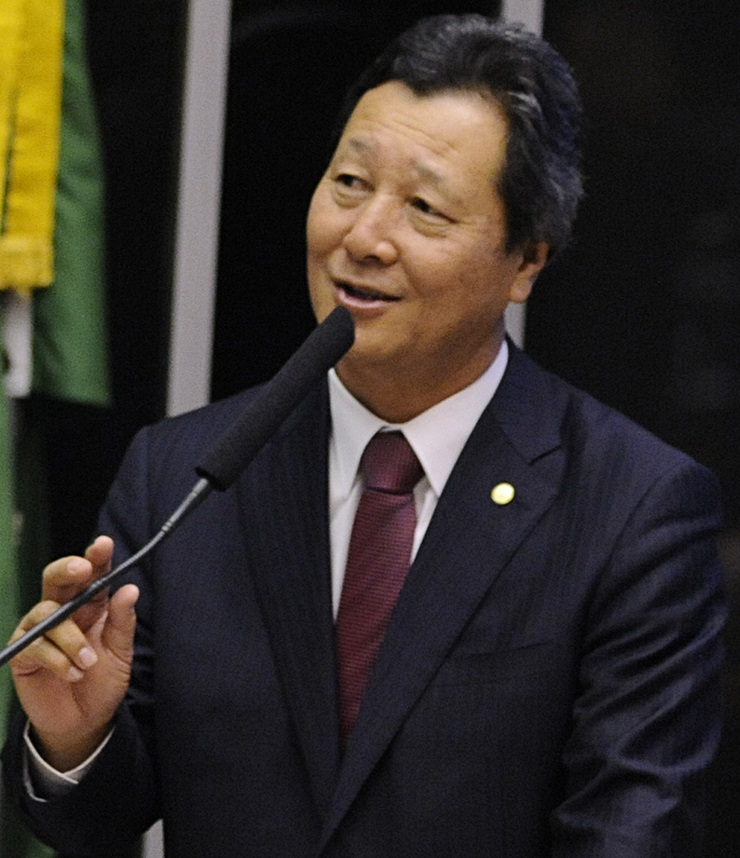
- Perondi in November 2015

Federal Deputy for Paraná
- Incumbent
- Assumed office 1 February 2011

State Deputy for Paraná
- In office 1 February 2003 – 31 January 2011

Personal details
- Born: 9 April 1949 (age 77) Marialva, Paraná, Brazil
- Party: PR (2013–); PSDB (2007–2013); PP (2002–2007)

Luiz Hiloshi Nishimori (born 9 April 1949) is a Brazilian politician and farmer. He has spent his political career representing Paraná, having served as a state deputy representative from 2005 to 2011 and as federal deputy representative from 2011.

== Personal life ==
Nishimori is married to Akemi Nishimori and has two children. He has been a farmer since 1970, growing soybeans and wheat. His family owns the pesticide company named Mariagro Agrícola Ltda and his children are the owners of another company named Nishimori Agrícola.

== Political career ==
Nishimori voted in favor of the impeachment against then-president Dilma Rousseff and political reformation. He would later vote in against opening a corruption investigation against Rousseff's successor Michel Temer, and voted in favor of the 2017 Brazilian labor reforms. Nishimori is a supporter of reforming the pension system run by the government in Brazil.

Nishimori was one of the principal drafters of bill 6299, which relaxed the rules concerning the usage of pesticides on Brazilian farms. This bill essentially overturned Law 7.8022 passed in 1989 that limited the amount of pesticides that the Ministry of Agriculture would allow used, with regulation from health agencies. Bill 6299 was passed and became a law in 2018.

There was some controversy as Nishimori's company profited from the loosening laws regarding pesticide usage that Nishimori helped pass. He has also been accused of covering up the use of DDT in his and other farms in Brazil.

He is currently president of the Parliamentary Front in Defense of Fish; president of the Brazil Japan parliamentary group; coordinator of the Security Commission in the field of the Agricultural Parliamentary Front; member of the Committee on Agriculture, Livestock, Supply and Rural Development; member of the cooperative parliamentary front and also participates in other fronts and committees of the chamber of deputies.
