= Gilson Marques =

Brazilian politician (born 1981)

- Official portrait, 2019

Member of the Chamber of Deputies
- Incumbent
- Assumed office 1 February 2019
- Constituency: Santa Catarina

Personal details
- Born: Gilson Marques Vieira; 12 April 1981 (age 45) Rio do Sul, Santa Catarina, Brazil
- Party: NOVO (since 2017)
- Education: Regional University of Blumenau; Fundação Getulio Vargas
- Profession: Lawyer
- Website: gilsonmarques.com

Gilson Marques Vieira (born 12 April 1981) is a Brazilian politician serving as a member of the Chamber of Deputies since 2019. From 2004 to 2018, he worked as a lawyer.

He was reelected for the legislature 2023-2027.
