= Progressive Union (Brazil) =

Political alliance in Brazil

Progressive Union União Progressista
- Abbreviation: UPB
- President: Antônio Rueda
- Founded: 29 April 2025
- Registered: 26 March 2026
- Headquarters: Brasília, Federal District
- Membership (2025): 2,410,352
- Ideology: Liberal conservatism; Conservative liberalism
- Political position: Centre-right
- Slogan: Upwards Brazil!
- Party members: Brazil Union (UNIÃO); Progressistas (PP)
- Governors: 6 / 27
- Mayors: 1,344 / 5,669
- Federal Senate: 12 / 81
- Chamber of Deputies: 101 / 513
- State deputies: 186 / 1,060
- Councillors: 12,351 / 58,026

Party flag

The Progressive Union Federation (Portuguese: Federação União Progressista, UPB) is an electoral and parliamentary group formed by Brazil Union and Progressistas.

The federation brings together two parties that trace their lineages to the National Renewal Alliance (ARENA), a party that supported the Brazilian military dictatorship, and its successor, the Democratic Social Party (PDS).

In March 2025, with a sum of both parties, the federation had 2,410,352 registered members. The size of the federation's creation led to it being called a "superfederation", as it will have the largest benches in both houses of the National Congress, the largest number of affiliated mayors and governors, and largest share of party subsidies.

== History ==
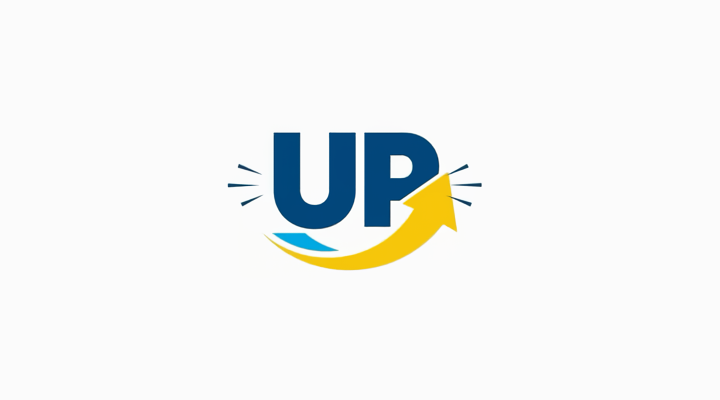
Former logo

Former logo

In March 2025, political parties Brazil Union and Progressistas, presided by Antônio Rueda and Ciro Nogueira, respectively, began negotiations to form a federation. On 18 March, a deliberation by both parties approved further negotiations.

On 28 April, Brazil Union and Progressistas announced the founding of Progressive Union in a ceremony held at the Noble Hall of the Chamber of Deputies, which would be held on 29 April.

Both parties agreed that the presidency should be shared between Rueda and Nogueira until December 2025, when a sole leader will be elected.

== Composition ==
The federation consists of two political parties:

Party	Portuguese	Leader	Ideology	Deputies	Senators
Brazil Union	União Brasil (UNIÃO)	Antônio Rueda	Liberal conservatism	52 / 513	4 / 81
Progressives	Progressistas (PP)	Ciro Nogueira	Conservative liberalism	49 / 513	8 / 81

=== Presidential election ===
Election	Candidate	Running mate	Coalition	First round		Second round		Result
Election	Candidate	Running mate	Coalition	Votes	%	Votes	%	Result
Source: *First round: neutrality for the 2026 Brazilian general election

== See also ==
- List of political parties in Brazil
