= Augusto Coutinho =

Brazilian politician

- Coutinho in 2017

Member of the Chamber of Deputies
- Incumbent
- Assumed office 1 February 2011
- Constituency: Pernambuco

State representative
- In office 1 February 1999 – 31 December 2010
- Constituency: Pernambuco

Vereador of Recife
- In office 1 January 1992 – 31 December 1998

Personal details
- Born: 22 October 1962 (age 63) Recife, Pernambuco, Brazil
- Party: SD (2013–); DEM (2007–2013); PFL (1986–2007)

Augusto Rodrigues Coutinho de Melo (born 22 October 1962) more commonly known as Augusto Coutinho is a Brazilian politician as well as a civil engineer. He has spent his political career representing Pernambuco, having served as state representative since 2011.

== Early life ==
Coutinho was born to Henoch Coutinho de Melo and Carmen Rodrigues Coutinho de Melo. Before entering politics Coutinho worked as a civil engineer.

== Political career ==
Coutinho voted in favor of the impeachment motion of then-president Dilma Rousseff. He would later vote against opening a similar corruption investigation into Rousseff's successor Michel Temer, and voted in favor of the 2017 Brazilian labor reforms.

In January 2019 Coutinho was appointed leader of the Solidariedade party in the Brazilian legislature.
