= Santana do Ipanema =

Municipality in Alagoas, Brazil

- Municipality
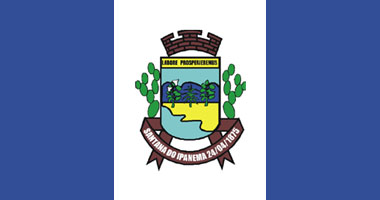
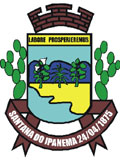
- Flag Coat of arms
- Nickname: Princesinha do Sertão (Little Princess of the Sertão)
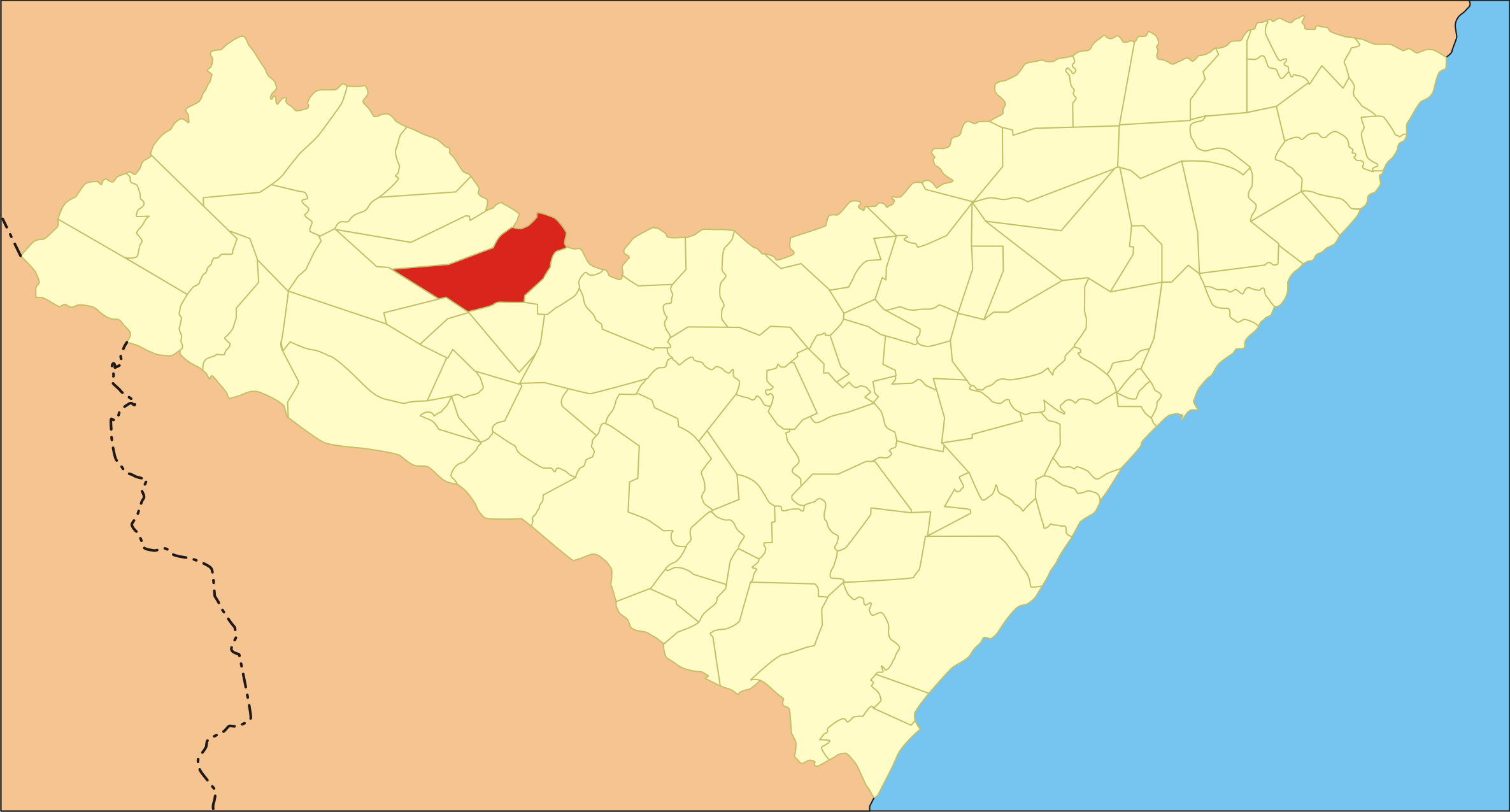
- Location of Santana do Ipanema in the State of Alagoas

- Location in Brazil
- Coordinates: 09°22′40″S 37°14′42″W
- Country: Brazil
- State: Alagoas
- Founded: April 24, 1875

Government
  - Mayor: Isnaldo Bulhoes Barros (PMDB)

Area
  - Total: 437.847 km^{2} (169.054 sq mi)

Population (2020)
  - Total: 47,819
  - Density: 103.81/km^{2} (268.9/sq mi)
- Demonym: santanense
- Time zone: UTC−3 (BRT)
- Website: Official website

Santana do Ipanema (Central northeastern portuguese pronunciation: [sɐ̃ˈtɐ̃nɐ ˈdu ipɐˈnẽmɐ]) is a municipality in the western half of the Brazilian state of Alagoas. It was founded in 1875 on the banks of the Ipanema river.

Its population was 47,819 (2020) and its area is 438 km².
