= Força Sindical =

FS
- Força Sindical
- Founded: 1991
- Headquarters: São Paulo, Brazil
- Location: Brazil
- Members: 2.1 million
- Key people: Miguel Torres, president
- Affiliations: ITUC
- Website: www.fsindical.org.br

The Força Sindical (FS) is a trade union centre in Brazil. It was formed in 1991 by Luis Antônio Medeiros, a leader from the Confederação Geral dos Trabalhadores. It opposes the left-wing radicalism of the Central Única dos Trabalhadores in favor of a more pragmatic and less ideological approach. Politically it is associated with the centrist Solidarity party.

The FS is affiliated with the International Trade Union Confederation.
