= Solidary Renewal Federation =

Brazilian political group

Solidary Renewal Federation Federação Renovação Solidária
- President: Ovasco Resende
- Vice President: Eurípedes Júnior
- Founded: 25 June 2025
- Registered: 4 December 2025
- Headquarters: Brasília, Federal District
- Ideology: National conservatism Labourism
- Political position: Centre-right to right-wing
- Party members: PRD; Solidariedade
- Federal Senate: 0 / 81
- Chamber of Deputies: 9 / 513
- Governorships: 0 / 27
- State Assemblies: 31 / 1,024
- Mayors: 138 / 5,569
- City Councillors: 2,657 / 58,026

The Solidary Renewal Federation (Portuguese: Federação Renovação Solidária) is an electoral and parliamentary group formed by the Democratic Renewal Party and Solidariedade.

The federation was officially announced on 25 June 2025, in a special session of the Chamber of Deputies.

On 27 August 2025, an official request was sent for approval of the Superior Electoral Court. On 4 December, the court had decided for the registration approval.

== Composition ==
The federation consists of two political parties:

| Party | Portuguese | Leader | Ideology | Deputies | Senators |
|---|---|---|---|---|---|
| Democratic Renewal Party | Partido Renovação Democrática (PRD) | Ovasco Resende | National conservatism | 4 / 513 | 0 / 81 |
| Solidarity | Solidariedade | Paulo Pereira da Silva | Labourism | 5 / 513 | 0 / 81 |
