= Pedro Uczai =

Brazilian politician (born 1963)

- Uczai in 2024

Member of the Chamber of Deputies
- Incumbent
- Assumed office 1 February 2011
- Constituency: Santa Catarina

Member of the Legislative Assembly of Santa Catarina
- In office 1 February 2007 – 1 February 2011
- Constituency: At-large
- In office 1 February 1995 – 1 January 2001
- Constituency: At-large

Personal details
- Born: Pedro Francisco Uczai; 10 March 1963 (age 63) Descanso, Santa Catarina, Brazil
- Party: PT (since 1989)
- Profession: Teacher

Pedro Francisco Uczai (born 10 March 1963) is a Brazilian politician serving as a member of the Chamber of Deputies since 2011. He was a member of the Legislative Assembly of Santa Catarina from 1997 to 1998, from 1999 to 2000, and from 2007 to 2010. From 2002 to 2004, he served as mayor of Chapecó.
