= Isnaldo Bulhões =

Brazilian politician (born 1976)

- Bulhões in 2019

Member of the Chamber of Deputies
- Incumbent
- Assumed office 1 February 2019
- Constituency: Alagoas

Personal details
- Born: 30 October 1976 (age 49)
- Party: Brazilian Democratic Movement (since 2016)
- Parent: Renilde Bulhões (mother)

Isnaldo Bulhões Barros Junior (born 30 October 1976) is a Brazilian politician serving as a member of the Chamber of Deputies since 2019. From 1999 to 2019, he was a member of the Legislative Assembly of Alagoas. He is the son of Renilde Bulhões.
