= Solidarity (Brazil) =

Solidarity Solidariedade
- President: Paulo Pereira da Silva
- General Secretary: Luiz Adriano
- Vice President: Jefferson Coriteac
- Treasurer: Luciano Araújo
- Founded: 25 October 2012; 14 years ago
- Legalized: 24 September 2013; 13 years ago
- Split from: Democratic Labour Party
- Headquarters: Brasília, DF
- Newspaper: Humanitá
- Think tank: 1 May Foundation
- Youth wing: Youth Secretariat
- Women's wing: Women Secretariat
- LGBT wing: Social Equality Secretariat
- Elder wing: Retirees, Pensioner and Elder Secretariat
- Membership (2022): 257,638
- Ideology: Social democracy; Third Way; Labourism
- Political position: Centre
- National affiliation: Solidary Renewal Federation
- Colours: Orange & blue
- Chamber of Deputies: 6 / 513
- Federal Senate: 1 / 81
- Mayorships: 95 / 5,568
- Legislative assemblies: 29 / 1,024
- City councillors: 1,348 / 56,810

Website
- www.solidariedade.org.br
- Politics of Brazil; Political parties; Elections; A: The party has also been described as center-right and center-left

Solidarity (Portuguese: Solidariedade, pronounced [solidaɾieˈdadʒi]) is a Brazilian centrist political party that uses the TSE number 77. The party elected 13 deputies and one senator in the 2018 Brazilian general election.

Solidarity was founded by Paulinho da Força, union leader and former president of the Força Sindical trade union centre. The new party reflected its origin on the Força Sindical: to be a labourist party, but with a less ideological and more pragmatic approach. Combining labor and trade union agendas with a centrist political stance, focused on dialogue with the business sector and the advocacy of policies for economic growth and job creation. Solidariedade defines itself as centrist, laborist, and humanist, and is occasionally described as "center-left". In practice, however, its parliamentary activity and political alliances frequently position it as part of the so-called Centrão—a bloc characterized by pragmatism and the pursuit of influence in Congress.

In the 2022 Brazilian general election, Solidarity supported the pre-candidacy of Lula da Silva in the 2022 Brazilian general election under the alliance Let's go together for Brazil. It remains allied with the Workers Party & other coalition members. Following the elections, the party announced plans to merge with the Republican Party of the Social Order, with PROS joining an enlarged party under the same name. The Superior Electoral Court approved the merger on February 14, 2023.

== Ideology ==
The party identifies itself as centre-left and social-democratic. The party has strong links with Força Sindical, a labour union that historically strongly opposes the hegemony of Central Única dos Trabalhadores and other leftist labour movements in favor of a less ideological and more pragmatic approach, "Sindicalismo de Resultados" (Unionism of Results), which means less ideology and more direct gains for the working class.

The party supports a world-view following social constructionism and social constructivism.

It has also been described as right-wing as well.

== Electoral history ==
=== Presidential elections ===
Election	Candidate	Running mate	Coalition	First round		Second round		Result
Election	Candidate	Running mate	Coalition	Votes	%	Votes	%	Result
2014	Aécio Neves (PSDB)	Aloysio Nunes (PSDB)	PSDB; PMN; Solidarity; DEM; PEN; PTN; PTB; PTC; PTdoB	34,897,211	33.55% (#2)	54,041,155	48.36% (#2)	Not elected ✗
2018	Geraldo Alckmin (PSDB)	Ana Amélia Lemos (PP)	PSDB; PP; PL; PRB; PSD; Solidarity; DEM; PTB; PPS	5,096,349	4.76% (#4)	–	–	Not elected ✗
2022	Luiz Inácio Lula da Silva (PT)	Geraldo Alckmin (PSB)	PT; PCdoB; PV; PSOL; REDE; PSB; Solidarity; Avante; Agir	57,259,405	48.43% (#1)	60,345,999	50.90% (#1)	Elected ✓
Source: Election Resources: Federal Elections in Brazil – Results Lookup

=== Legislative elections ===
Election	Chamber of Deputies				Federal Senate				Role in government
Election	Votes	%	Seats	+/–	Votes	%	Seats	+/–	Role in government
2014	2,689,701	2.77%	15 / 513	New	370,507	0.41%	1 / 81	New	Opposition (2014–2016)
2014	2,689,701	2.77%	15 / 513	New	370,507	0.41%	1 / 81	New	Coalition (2016–2018)
2018	1,953,067	1.99%	13 / 513	▼2	4,001,903	2.34%	1 / 81	0	Opposition
2022	1,728,083	1.57%	4 / 513	▼9	19,408	0.02%	0 / 81	▼1	Coalition (2022–2026)
2022	1,728,083	1.57%	4 / 513	▼9	19,408	0.02%	0 / 81	▼1	Independent (2026–present)
2026	1,049,014	0.92%	2 / 513	▼2	134,992	0.10%	0 / 81	0	TBA

== See also ==
- Category:Solidariedade politicians

Preceded by 70 - AVANTE	Numbers of Brazilian Official Political Parties; 77 - SOLIDARIEDADE	Succeeded by 80 - PU (UP)
