= Alexandre Giordano =

Brazilian entrepreneur and politician

Senator for São Paulo
- Incumbent
- Assumed office 31 March 2021
- Preceded by: Major Olímpio

Personal details
- Born: Alexandre Luiz Giordano; 26 June 1973 (age 53) São Paulo, Brazil
- Party: PODE (since 2026)
- Other political affiliations: PV (2005–2016); PSDB (2016–2018); PSL (2018–2021); MDB (2021–2026)
- Profession: Politician, entrepreneur

Alexandre Luiz Giordano (born 26 June 1973 in São Paulo) is a Brazilian entrepreneur and politician, filiated to Podemos (PODE) political party. Currently, he is Middle Senator for the state of São Paulo.

== Political life ==
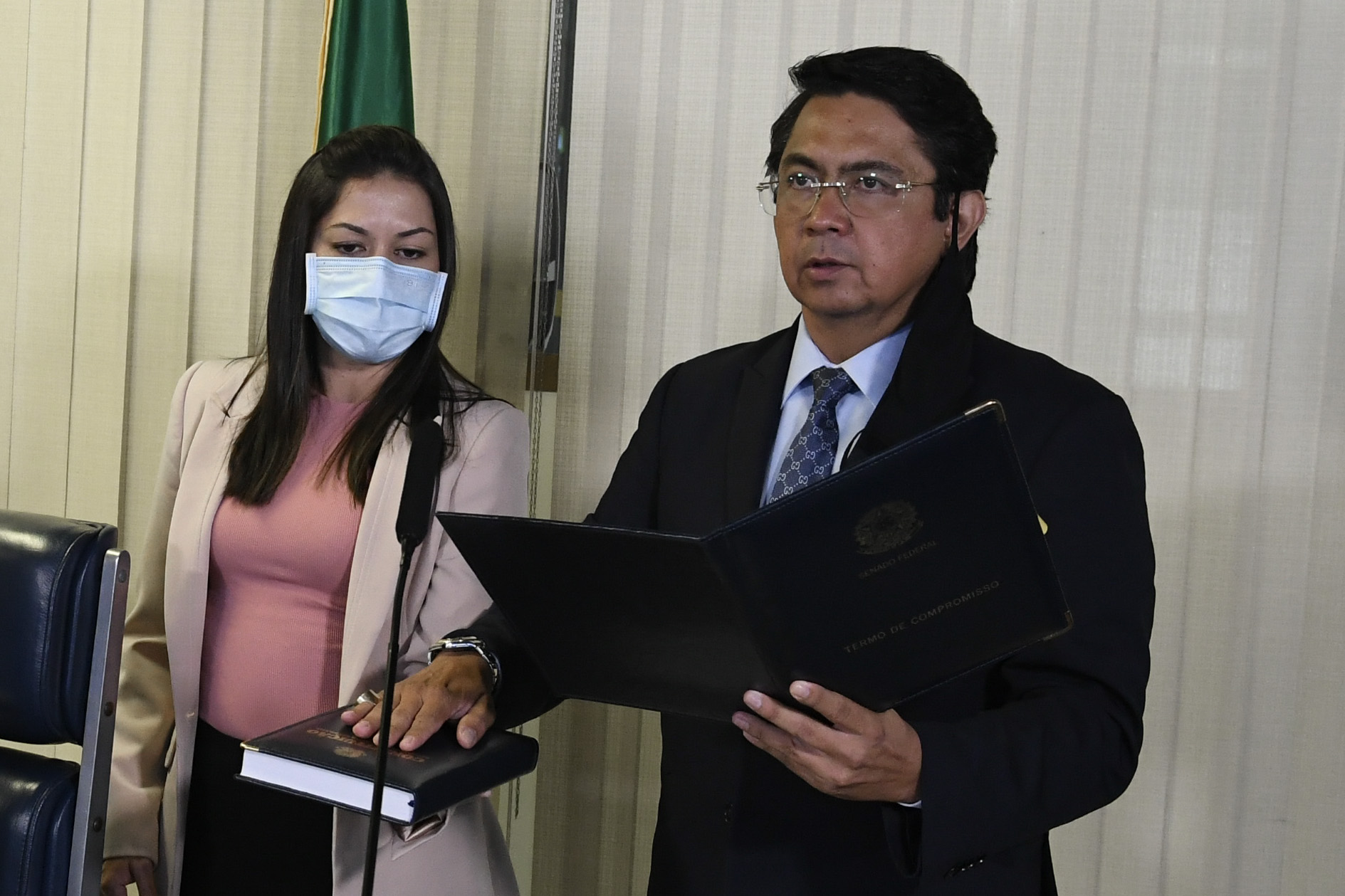
Giordano is sworn in as Senator.

Giordano was elected in 2018 as first-substitute of Senator in the ticket of Major Olímpio and Marcos Pontes. After Olímpio's death, he was sworn in on 31 March 2021.

Before his membership to the Social Liberal Party, Giordano was member of the Green Party (PV) and the Brazilian Social Democracy Party (PSDB).

Giordano was pointed as a key figure of the deal between Brazil and Paraguay for the selling of excess Paraguayan energy from Itaipu Dam to the Léros company. This crisis almost led to an impeachment process against Paraguayan President Mario Abdo Benítez.

In the city of São Paulo, on the eve of the 2024 municipal elections, the senator declared his support for the left-wing pre-candidate, Guilherme Boulos. Even though he is affiliated in the same party of the incumbent in the city's executive position Ricardo Nunes, the senator gained little notoriety after highly criticizing the idea of the mayor announcing a retired military police officer, Colonel Mello Araújo, as a vice-candidate on Nunes' ticket for his re-election.
