= Democratic Renewal Party (Brazil) =

Democratic Renewal Party Partido Renovação Democrática
- Abbreviation: PRD
- President: Marcus Vinícius Neskau
- Founded: 26 October 2022
- Registered: 9 November 2023
- Merger of: Brazilian Labour Party; Patriota
- Headquarters: Brasília, DF
- Youth wing: PRD Jovem
- Women's wing: PRD Mulher
- Membership (2023): 1,334,065
- Ideology: National conservatism
- Political position: Right-wing
- National affiliation: Solidary Renewal Federation
- Party number: 25
- Federal Senate: 0 / 81
- Chamber of Deputies: 3 / 513

Website
- prd25.org.br

The Democratic Renewal Party (Portuguese: Partido Renovação Democrática, PRD) is a political party in Brazil, established on 26 October 2022 from the merger of two conservative parties: the Brazilian Labour Party (PTB) and Patriota. The merger was motivated by the results of the 2022 general election, since both parties failed to obtain the number of votes to meet the electoral threshold. With the union, the votes of the two parties were summed up and the new organization was considered to have reached the threshold.

With 1.3 million members in December 2023, it is the third largest party in the country.

== History ==
As of the 2018 general election, a progressive electoral threshold was established for political parties in Brazil to have access to party subsidies and free electoral advertising on radio and television. That year, Patriota did not meet the new criteria to be entitled to these benefits, the reason why it merged with the Progressive Republican Party.

In 2022, the Brazilian Labour Party and Patriota both failed to reach the threshold; therefore, the parties began negotiations for a merger. On 26 October, the merger was approved in the national conventions of both parties, on the condition that controversial PTB politicians Roberto Jefferson and Eduardo Cunha did not join the new organization. It was decided at the time that it would be called "More Brazil" (Portuguese: Mais Brasil) and would use the number 25 in elections.

=== Name issues ===
Originally, "More Brazil" was the name chosen for the registration of the party. However, in 2022, the Superior Electoral Court (TSE) rejected the request of the Brazilian Woman's Party to be renamed "Brazil Party" (Portuguese: Partido Brasil) or "For More Brazil" (Portuguese: Por Mais Brasil), on the grounds that these names did not distinguish its ideological orientation and could create confusion among voters with the Brazilian state itself. Hence, as a preventive measure against a potential rejection of the name "More Brazil", in 2023 the party adopted the alternative name "Democratic Renewal Party".

On 9 November 2023, the TSE registered the party, recognizing the second name.

== Election results ==
=== Legislative elections ===
Election	Chamber of Deputies				Federal Senate				Role in government
Election	Votes	%	Seats	+/–	Votes	%	Seats	+/–	Role in government
2026	1,203,659	1.06%	5 / 513	0	608,874	0.29%	0 / 81	0	TBA

Preceded by 23- Cidadania	Numbers of Brazilian Official Political Parties; 25 - DRP (PRD)	Succeeded by 27- CD (DC)
