= Anilda Leão =

Brazilian poet, writer, feminist, actress and singer

- Born: Anilda Neves Leão; 15 July 1923; Maceió, Alagoas, Brazil
- Died: 6 January 2012 (aged 88); Maceió, Brazil
- Occupations: poet, writer, feminist
- Years active: 1936-2003

Anilda Neves Leão (1923–2012) was a Brazilian poet, writer, feminist, actress and singer. She was a member of numerous feminist organizations in Alagoas and attended the 1963 World Congress on Women in Moscow. She published her first volume of poems in 1961 and her last volume in 2002. She performed in theater and the burgeoning film industry in Alagoas, writing scripts and acting in both short films and features.

== Biography ==
Anilda Neves Leão was born 15 July 1923 in Maceió, Alagoas, Brazil to Joaquim de Barros Leão and Jorgina Neves Leão She attended grammar school at the Colégio Imaculada Conceição (College of Immaculate Conception) and Junior High School at Colégio São José (St. Joseph's College). At thirteen years old, she published her first poem, about abandoned children. Leão attended Alagoas High School and then graduated in accounting from the Escola Técnica de Comércio (Technical school of Commerce) in Alagoas in 1945.

Her dream was to become a doctor, but her father would not allow it. In 1950, in an event organized by the Alagoas Federation for Women's Progress, she sang publicly for the first time. From that time forward, she was heavily involved in the struggle for women's rights and belonged to various feminist organizations in Alagoas, including the Center for Women of Alagoas, Federation for Women's Progress, the State Council for Women, and the Teotonio Vilela Foundation. In 1963, she participated in the World Congress on Women held in Moscow in the Soviet Union, as a representative of the Alagoas Federation for Women's Progress. In 1990, she became president of the organization.

In 1953, Leão married the architect, journalist, and writer Carlos Moliterno with whom she had two children. Moliterno encouraged her to write. She wrote articles for several publications of Alagoas, the magazines Caetés and Mocidade, as well as the newspapers, Jornal de Alagoas and Gazeta de Alagoas.

In 1961 she published her first book, Chão de Pedras (Stone Ground). In 1972 she wrote a volume of short stories, Riacho Seco (Dry creek), with which won the Graciliano Ramos Prize in 1973 from the Alagoas Academy of Letters. This was followed by many more publications, such as Chuvas de Verão (1974), Poemas Marcados (1978), Ohos Convexos (1989) Círculo Mágico (1993), and Eu em Trânsito (2002).

As an actor, she worked on films, including Lampião e Maria Bonita (1970) and Órfãos da Terra (1970), Alagoano Calabouço (1976) and as an extra in the films Bye Bye Brazil, Memórias do cárcere (1984), Deus é brasileiro (2002). She appeared in the short films, Ouça o silêncio, Mordaça (1975), Sacrossaques (1977), Relatório sem feed-back (1979), and Guenzo (1982). In 1978, a movie, directed by José Márcio Passos was presented adapted from one of her short stories, Alívio.

In the theater she performed in Bossa nordeste and Onde canta o sabiá. She worked on the staging of the play A farsa da boa preguiça, by Ariano Suassuna. Even with all of her performing, Leão worked in the 1970s, in the Department of Culture for the State of Alagoas, in the 1980s was the State Secretariat for culture.

She was a member of the Academia Alagoana de Letras (AAL) (Alagoas Academy of Letters), holding the 26th chair and a member of the Associação Alagoana de Imprensa (AAI) (Alagoas Press Association). She belonged to the Literary Group of Alagoas and the Alagoas Historical and Geographical Institute (IHGAL), holding the 7th chair.

Leão died at age 88, on 6 January 2012 in Maceió, Brazil, due to a generalized infection after fracturing her femur in a fall. She was buried at the cemetery Parque das Flores in the Barrio da Lourdes Grotto (Maceio).

== Awards ==
- Comenda Mário Guimarães (from the Mayor of Maceió).
- Comenda Nise da Silveira (from the Government of the State of Alagoas).
- Comenda Graciliano Ramos (from the Mayor of Maceió).
- Comenda da Ordem do Mérito de Palmares (from the Government of the State of Alagoas).
- Comenda Teotônio Vilela, (from the Teotônio Vilela Foundation).
- Faça Diploma de Mérito (Degree of Cultural Merit), (from the Brazilian Union of Writers).

== Selected works ==
=== Books ===
- Chão de Pedras (1961) (In Portuguese)
- Riacho Seco (1972) (In Portuguese)
- Chuvas de Verão (1974) (In Portuguese)
- Poemas marcados (1978) (In Portuguese)
- Olhos Convexos (1989) (In Portuguese)
- Círculo Mágico (e outros nem tanto) (1993) (In Portuguese)
- Eu em Trânsito (2002) (In Portuguese)

=== Articles ===
- ”Marina Pura e Humilde”, Revista da AAL, No. 1, p. 27-30 (fiction) (In Portuguese)
- ”Poemas”, Revista da AAL, No. 2, p. 13-14 (the book Poems marked) (In Portuguese)
- ”Salário mínimo”, Revista da AAL, No. 3, p. 33- 35 (story) (In Portuguese)
- ”Poluição”, Revista da AAL, No. 4, p. 25 (poetry) (In Portuguese)
- ”Ausência”, Revista da AAL, No. 4, p. 51-52 (story) (In Portuguese)
- ”Soneto de chão e de espaço”, Revista da AAL, No. 5, p. 29-30 (In Portuguese)
- ”Um conto para você”, Revista da AAL, No. 5, p. 41-43 (In Portuguese)
- ”Dois poemas”, Revista da AAL, No. 7, p. 37 (In Portuguese)
- ”Reflexões em torno do verão”, Revista da AAL, No. 7, p. 63-64 (In Portuguese)
- ”Dois poemas”, Revista da AAL, No. 8, p. 16-17 (In Portuguese)
- ”O social na poesía de Jorge de Lima”, Revista da AAL, No. 8, p. 211-216 (lecture No. 1, Salão do Escritor Alagoano, 25 November 1982) (In Portuguese)
- ”Romeu de Avelar”, Revista da AAL, No. 9, p. 129-131 (In Portuguese)
- ”Poemas de Anilda Leão”, Revista da AAL, No. 10, p. 19-22 (In Portuguese)
- ”Poemas de Anilda Leão”, Revista da AAL, No. 11, p. 25-28 (In Portuguese)
- ”O medalhão e sua mensagem poética”, Revista da AAL, No. 11, pp. 140–141 (on the book of Teomirtes de Barros Malta) (In Portuguese)
- ”Rosa menina”, Revista da AAL, No. 14, p. 203-204 (story) (In Portuguese)
- ”Três tempos”, Revista da AAL, No. 14, p. 232 (In Portuguese)
- ”Poema do nada”, Revista da AAL, No. 14, p. 233 (In Portuguese)
- ”Poema do amor teórico” Revista da AAL, No. 15, p. 133-135 (In Portuguese)
- ”A mulher e o mar”, Revista da AAL, No. 15, p. 171-173 (In Portuguese)
- ”A pessoa humana e a transcendental”, Revista da AAL, No. 15, p. 321-324 (In Portuguese)
- ”A paisagem”, Revista da AAL, No. 12, p. 69-70 (story) (In Portuguese)
- ”Tranqüilidade”, Revista da AAL, No. 13, p. 129-132 (story) (In Portuguese)
- ”O homem e sua dimensão”, Revista da AAL, No. 17, p. 67-68 (In Portuguese)
- ”Crônica do tempo e do lembrar”, Revista da AAL, No. 18, p. 188-189 (In Portuguese)
- ”Saudação a José María Tenório no día de sua posse na Academia Alagoana de Letras em 31/12/1999”, Revista da AAL, No. 18, p. 327-330 (In Portuguese)
