= Rodrigo Gambale =

Brazilian politician (born 1984)

- Gambale in 2018

Member of the Chamber of Deputies
- Incumbent
- Assumed office 1 February 2023
- Constituency: São Paulo

Personal details
- Born: 17 March 1984 (age 42) Mogi das Cruzes, Brazil
- Party: Podemos (since 2022)

Rodrigo Gambale Vieira (born 17 March 1984) is a Brazilian politician serving as a member of the Chamber of Deputies since 2023. From 2019 to 2023, he was a member of the Legislative Assembly of São Paulo.
