= Adolfo Viana =

Brazilian politician (born 1981)

- Viana in 2022

Member of the Chamber of Deputies
- Incumbent
- Assumed office 1 February 2019
- Constituency: Bahia

Member of the Legislative Assembly of Bahia
- In office 1 February 2011 – 1 February 2019
- Constituency: At-large

Personal details
- Born: Adolo Viana de Castro Neto; 2 February 1981 (age 45) Salvador, Bahia, Brazil
- Party: PSDB (since 2007)
- Other political affiliations: PFL (2005–2007)
- Profession: Public servant

Adolfo Viana de Castro Neto (born 2 February 1981) is a Brazilian politician serving as a member of the Chamber of Deputies since 2019. From 2011 to 2019, he was a member of the Legislative Assembly of Bahia.
