= Nova Russas =

Municipality in Ceará, Brazil

Coordinates: 4°42′S 40°34′W

- Municipality
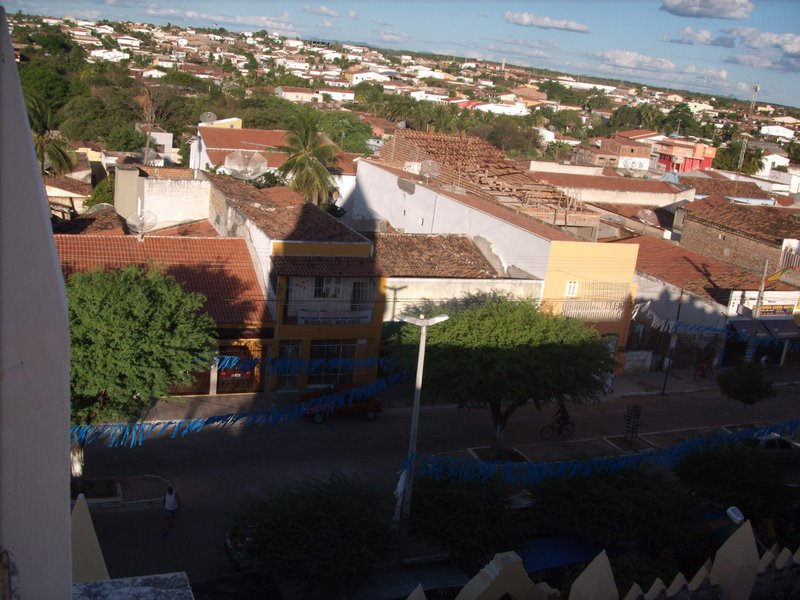
- View of Nova Russas

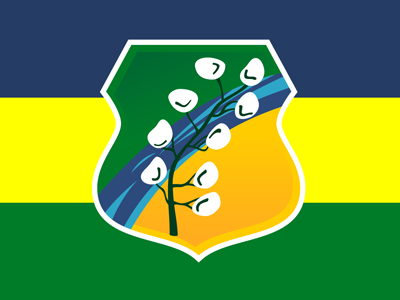
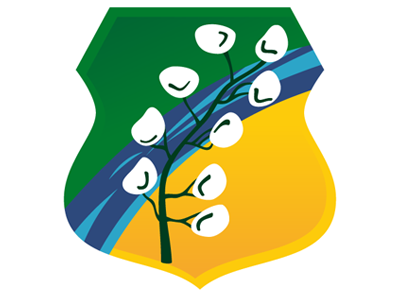
- Flag Coat of arms
- Interactive map of Nova Russas
- Country: Brazil
- Region: Nordeste
- State: Ceará
- Mesoregion: Sertoes Cearenses

Population (2020)
  - Total: 32,408
- Time zone: UTC−3 (BRT)

Nova Russas is a municipality in the state of Ceará in the Northeast region of Brazil.

== See also ==
- List of municipalities in Ceará
