= Waldemar Oliveira (politician) =

Brazilian politician (born 1972)

- Oliveira in 2025

Member of the Chamber of Deputies
- Incumbent
- Assumed office 1 February 2023
- Constituency: Pernambuco

Personal details
- Born: 29 November 1972 (age 53)
- Party: Avante (since 2019)

Waldemar de Andrada Ignácio de Oliveira (born 29 November 1972) is a Brazilian politician serving as a member of the Chamber of Deputies since 2023. From 2024 to 2025, he served as chairman of the administration and public services committee.
