= Jonas Donizette =

Brazilian politician

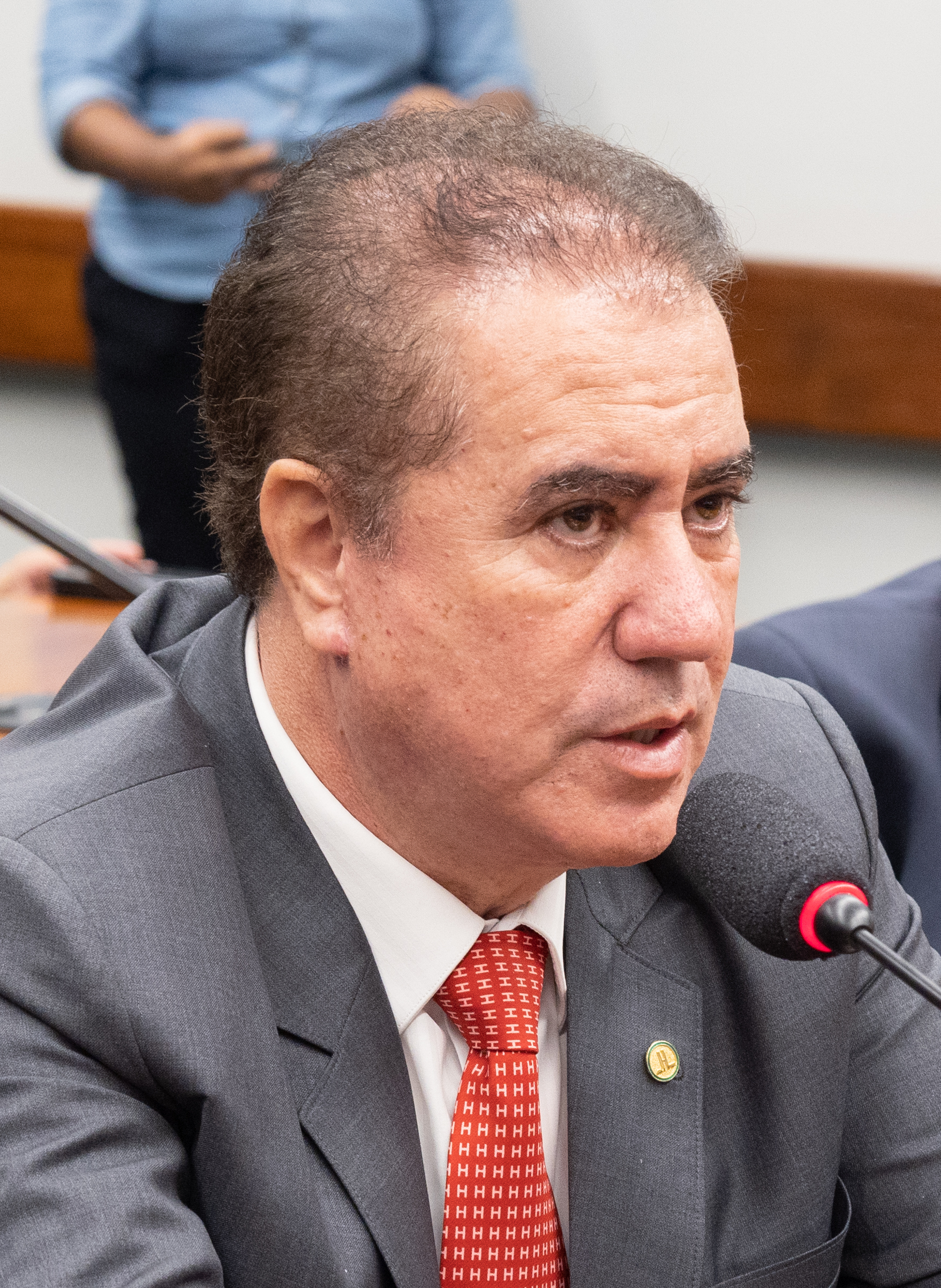
Jonas Donizette in 2023

Jonas Donizette (born 1965, in Monte Belo) is a Brazilian politician of the Brazilian Socialist Party (PSB) who serves as a member of Congress (Chamber of Deputies) since 2020. Before that, he served as mayor of Campinas, a Brazilian city in the State of São Paulo, between 2012 and 2020.

== Early life ==
Donizette was born in 1965 in Monte Belo in the state of Minas Gerais as the 20th child of a family of farmers, Maria José and João Marcelino Ferreira. The family moved to Campinas when he was 4 years old, in 1969.

== Political career ==
In 1992 he became the youngest elected to the Campinas’ House of Councillors. He was re-elected twice, both times with a plurality of votes. During the third term in 2002, Jonas Donizette was elected to the São Paulo State Assembly. In 2006 he was reelected.

Donizette was chosen as one of top ten São Paulo’s best legislators by Conscious Vote Movement (Movimento Voto Consciente) in 2010. In the São Paulo State Assembly, he sponsored a law to give back money to the automotive ownership taxpayers if their car is stolen. He was also the author of the urban forestry act and the law that became a health public priority the otoacoustic emission test for babies.

In October 2012, Jonas Donizette was elected mayor of Campinas and in April 2013, he was elected as vice president of Brazil’s National Front of Mayors (FNP), an organization composed of 658 Brazilian municipalities, including 26 capitals and more than 100 cities with populations above 100,000 inhabitants. He was reelected in 2016 and was elected as president of FNP in April 2017.
