= Sóstenes Cavalcante =

Brazilian politician

Member of the Chamber of Deputies
- Incumbent
- Assumed office 1 February 2015
- Constituency: Rio de Janeiro

Personal details
- Born: Sóstenes Silva Cavalcante; 16 January 1975 (age 51) Maceió, Alagoas, Brazil
- Party: PL (2022–present)
- Other political affiliations: PSD (2013–2016); DEM (2016–2022); UNIÃO (2022)
- Website: www.lagoadigital.com/sostenes/

Religious life
- Religion: Christian
- Denomination: Neopentecostal
- Church: Assembly of God

Sóstenes Silva Cavalcante (born 16 January 1975) is a Brazilian politician and pastor. Although born in Alagoas, he has spent his political career representing Rio de Janeiro (state), having served as state representative since 2015.

== Personal life ==
Cacalcante is married to Isleia Cavalcante. He is a pastor of the Assembleias de Deus church.

== Political career ==
Cavalcante voted in favor of the impeachment against then-president Dilma Rousseff and political reformation. He would later back Rousseff's successor Michel Temer against a similar impeachment motion, and also voted in favor of the Brazil labor reform (2017).

Due to his evangelical beliefs Cacalcante is strongly against same-sex marriage, and since his time in the chambers of deputies has been pushing for a bill that would define marriage as exclusively between a man and woman. During his time in office Cacalcante has lobbied with other evangelical politicians including Eduardo Cunha and Everaldo Pereira.

=== PL 1904/2024 ===
In 2024, he proposed the PL 1904/2024, which equates abortion after 22 weeks of gestation to simple homicide and restrictions, including in cases of pregnancy resulting from rape, cases in which abortion is permitted under current legislation.

Cavalcante stated that he proposed the bill to "test" whether Former President Luiz Inácio Lula da Silva would fulfill his promise not to veto projects of a moral nature.

The project was accepted by the president of the Chamber, Arthur Lira, and began to be processed urgently after a controversial symbolic vote, which generated a wave of protests over its content, given that the proposal would equate the penalty for abortion after 22 weeks of gestation to that of the crime of homicide, being greater than the penalty for the crime of rape itself and therefore penalizing the victim more than the rapist.

Political offices
Preceded by André de Paula	Second Vice President of the Chamber of Deputies; 2023–present	Incumbent
