= Chamber of Deputies (Brazil) =

Lower house of the Brazilian National Congress

Coordinates: 15°47′59″S 47°51′51″W

Chamber of Deputies Câmara dos Deputados
- 57th Legislature of the National Congress

Type
- Type: Lower house of the Brazilian National Congress
- Term limits: None

History
- Founded: 6 May 1826
- New session started: 2 February 2026

Leadership
- President: Hugo Motta, Republicanos since 1 February 2025
- Government Leader: Paulo Pimenta, PT since 14 April 2026
- Majority Leader: Arlindo Chinaglia, PT since 8 April 2025
- Opposition Leader: Cabo Gilberto Silva, PL since 16 December 2025
- Minority Leader: Gustavo Gayer, PL since 19 December 2025

Structure
- Seats: 513
- Political groups: Outgoing legislature Government (205): Brazil of Hope (81) (Note: PT (64); PCdoB (11); PV (6)); PSD (48); MDB (38); PSB (17); PSOL-REDE (16) (Note: PSOL (13); REDE (3)); Avante (5); Opposition (256): UPB (98) (Note: UNIÃO (52); PP (46)); PL (98); PODE (27); PSDB-Cidadania (20) (Note: PSDB (18); Cidadania (2)); Solidary Renewal (7) (Note: Solidariedade (4); PRD (3)); NOVO (5); MISSÃO (1); Independent (52): Republicanos (42); PDT (10)
- Political groups: Incoming legislature: PL (121); FE Brasil (88) (Note: PT (70); PCdoB (11); PV (7)); UPB (87) (Note: UNIÃO (46); PP (41)); PSD (43); Republicanos (41); MDB (36); PODE (27); PSB (15); PSOL-REDE (15) (Note: PSOL (14); REDE (1)); PSDB (11); NOVO (10); FRS (7) (Note: PRD (5); Solidarity (2)); PDT (6); Avante (5); MISSÃO (1)
- Length of term: 4 years
- Salary: R$ 39,293 monthly (and benefits)

Elections
- Voting system: Open list proportional representation (D'Hondt method)
- Last election: 4 October 2026
- Next election: October 2030

Meeting place
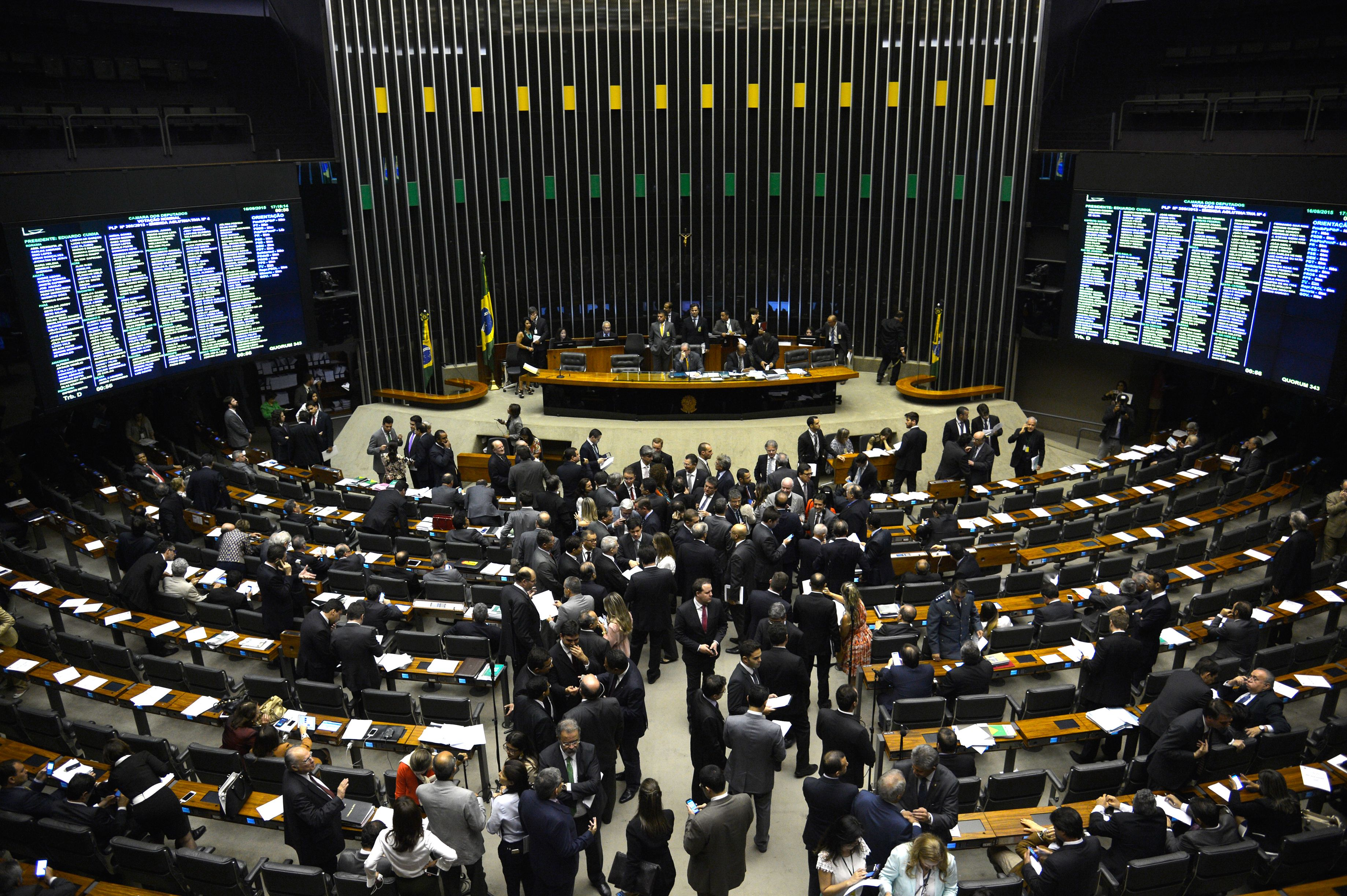
- Ulysses Guimarães plenary chamber National Congress Palace; Brasília, Federal District, Brazil

Website
- www.camara.leg.br

The Chamber of Deputies (Portuguese: Câmara dos Deputados) is a federal legislative body and the lower house of the National Congress of Brazil. The chamber comprises 513 deputies, who are elected by proportional representation to serve four-year terms. The current president of the chamber is the Deputy Hugo Motta (Republicanos-PB), who was elected on 1 February 2025.

== Structure ==
The number of deputies elected is proportional to the size of the population of the respective state (or of the Federal District) as of 1994. However, no delegation can be made up of less than eight or more than seventy seats. Thus the least populous state elects eight federal deputies and the most populous elects seventy. These restrictions favour the smaller states at the expense of the more populous states and so the size of the delegations is not exactly proportional to population.

Elections to the Chamber of Deputies are held every four years, with all seats up for election.

== Federal representation ==
A census held every 10 years by the Brazilian Institute of Geography and Statistics is used as the basis for the distribution of the seats. Proportionality is followed as a principle, with the exception that there should be a minimum of eight (8) members and a maximum of seventy (70) members per state. Per the 2010 census, states with 3,258,117 inhabitants upwards have 9 to 70 deputies.

As a result, although most states hover around an average of 362,013 inhabitants by deputy (per the 2010 census), some states with smaller populations have a much lower average, such as Roraima (1 for 51,000 inhabitants).

State	Deputies currently allotted	%	Population (2010 Census)	%	Population per deputy	Deputies in proportional allotment	Difference (actual−proportional)
São Paulo	70	13.6%	39,924,091	21.5%	570,344	110	–40
Minas Gerais	53	10.3%	19,159,260	10.3%	361,495	53	0
Rio de Janeiro	46	9%	15,180,636	8.2%	330,014	42	+4
Bahia	39	7.6%	13,633,969	7.3%	349,589	38	+1
Rio Grande do Sul	31	6%	10,576,758	5.7%	341,186	29	+2
Paraná	30	5.8%	10,226,737	5.5%	340,891	28	+2
Pernambuco	25	4.9%	8,541,250	4.6%	341,650	24	+1
Ceará	22	4.3%	8,450,527	4.4%	371,822	23	–1
Maranhão	18	3.5%	6,424,340	3.5%	356,908	18	0
Goiás	17	3.3%	5,849,105	3.1%	344,065	16	+1
Pará	17	3.3%	7,443,904	4.0%	437,877	21	–4
Santa Catarina	16	3.1%	6,178,603	3.3%	386,163	17	–1
Paraíba	12	2.3%	3,753,633	2.0%	312,803	10	+2
Espírito Santo	10	1.9%	3,392,775	1.8%	339,278	9	+1
Piauí	10	1.9%	3,086,448	1.7%	308,645	9	+1
Alagoas	9	1.7%	3,093,994	1.7%	343,777	9	0
Acre	8	1.6%	707,125	0.4%	88,391	2	+6
Amazonas	8	1.6%	3,350,773	1.8%	418,847	9	–1
Amapá	8	1.6%	648,553	0.3%	81,069	2	+6
Distrito Federal	8	1.6%	2,469,489	1.3%	308,686	7	+1
Mato Grosso do Sul	8	1.6%	2,404,256	1.3%	300,532	7	+1
Mato Grosso	8	1.6%	2,954,625	1.6%	369,328	8	0
Rio Grande do Norte	8	1.6%	3,121,451	1.7%	390,181	9	–1
Rondônia	8	1.6%	1,535,625	0.8%	191,953	4	+4
Roraima	8	1.6%	425,398	0.2%	53,175	1	+7
Sergipe	8	1.6%	2,036,227	1.1%	254,528	6	+2
Tocantins	8	1.6%	1,373,551	0.7%	171,694	4	+4
Total	513	100%	185,712,713	100%	362,013	514	–2

== Present composition ==
Parties and Federations in the 57th Chamber of Deputies
Party	Floor leader	Seats
UPB	Pedro Lucas Fernandes	98
Liberal Party	Sóstenes Cavalcante	98
Brazil of Hope Federation	Pedro Uczai	81
Social Democratic Party	Antonio Brito	48
Republicanos	Augusto Coutinho	42
Brazilian Democratic Movement	Isnaldo Bulhões	38
PODE	Rodrigo Gambale	27
PSDB-Cidadania Federation	Adolfo Viana	20
Brazilian Socialist Party	Jonas Donizette	17
PSOL REDE Federation	Tarcísio Motta	16
Democratic Labour Party	Mário Heringer	10
Solidarity Renewal	Unknown	7
Avante	Bruno Farias	5
New Party	Marcel van Hattem	5
Mission Party	Kim Kataguiri	1
Total		513

=== Partisan blocs composition ===
Partisan bloc leadership is organized into the following roles:

- Government Leader: elected by members of the party of the Cabinet in the Chamber to speak on behalf of the Cabinet
- Majority Leader: elected by the leaders of the majority bloc in the Chamber, usually in support of the Cabinet
- Opposition Leader: elected by the members of the largest party in opposition to the Cabinet
- Minority Leader: elected by the leaders of the minority bloc, usually in opposition to the Cabinet

Bloc	Leader
Government	José Guimarães (PT-CE)
Majority	Arlindo Chinaglia (PT-SP)
Opposition	Gilberto Silva (PL-PB)
Minority	Gustavo Gayer (PL-GO)

== Bodies ==
The House of Deputies is composed of the Bureau of the Chamber of Deputies of Brazil by College Leaders and the Commissions, which can be permanent, temporary, or special inquiry.

=== Bureau of the Chamber of Deputies of Brazil ===
The current composition of the Board of the Chamber of Deputies is the following:

President: Hugo Motta (Republicanos-PB)
1st vice president: Altineu Côrtes (PL-RJ)
2nd vice president: Elmar Nascimento (UNIÃO-BA)
1st secretary: Carlos Veras (PT-PE)
2nd secretary: Lula da Fonte (PP-PE)
3rd secretary: Delegada Katarina (PSD-SE)
4th secretary: Sérgio Souza (MDB-PR)
1st substitute: Antonio Carlos Rodrigues (PL-SP)
2nd substitute: Paulo Folletto (PSB-ES)
3rd substitute: Victor Linhalis (PODE-ES)
4th substitute: Paulo Alexandre Barbosa (PSDB-SP)

=== Standing commissions ===
Commission	Chair
Administration and Public Service	Delegada Ione (PL-MG)
Agriculture, Livestock, Supply and Rural Development	Luiz Nishimori (PSD-PR)
Amazon and Originary and Traditional People	Juliana Cardoso (PT-SP)
Communication	Maria Rosas (Republicanos-SP)
Consumer Defence	Clodoaldo Magalhães (PV-PE)
Constitution, Justice and Citizenship	Leur Lomanto Júnior (UNIÃO-BA)
Culture	Carol Dartora (PT-PR)
Defense of Women Rights	Erika Hilton (PSOL-SP)
Defense of Elderly Rights	Weliton Prado (Solidariedade-MG)
Defense of People with Disabilities Rights	Rodrigo Rollemberg (PSB-DF)
Economic Development	Jadyel Alencar (Republicanos-PI)
Education	Benes Leocádio (UNIÃO-RN)
Environment and Sustainable Development	Valdir Cobalchini (MDB-SC)
Ethics and Parliamentary Decorum	Fabio Schiochet (UNIÃO-SC)
Finances and Taxation	Merlong Solano (PT-PI)
Financial Oversight and Control	Alexandre Lindenmeyer (PT-RS)
Foreign Affairs and National Defense	Luiz Philippe of Orléans-Braganza (PL-SP)
Health	Giovani Cherini (PL-RS)
Human Rights, Minorities and Racial Equality	Alice Portugal (PCdoB-BA)
Industry, Trade and Services	Beto Richa (PSDB-PR)
Labour	Max Lemos (PDT-RJ)
Mines and Energy	Joaquim Passarinho (PL-PA)
National Integration and Regional Development	Moses Rodrigues (UNIÃO-CE)
Participative Legislation	Frederico Escaleira (PRD-MG)
Public Security and Fight Against Organized Crime	Luiz Meira (PL-PE)
Roads and Transports	Claudio Cajado (PP-BA)
Science, Technology and Innovation	Átila Lira (PP-PI)
Social Security, Social Assistance, Childhood, Adolescence and Family	Bruno Ganem (PODE-SP)
Sports	Saulo Pedroso (PSD-SP)
Tourism	Daniela Reinehr (PL-SC)
Urban Development	Keniston Braga (MDB-PA)

== See also ==
- Federal institutions of Brazil
- 57th Legislature of the National Congress
- National Congress of Brazil
- Federal Senate
- TV Câmara
- Evangelical Parliamentary Front
