= Bureau of the Chamber of Deputies of Brazil =

The Board of Directors of the Chamber of Deputies of Brazil is the body responsible for directing the legislative work and administrative services of the Chamber of Deputies, the lower house of the National Congress of Brazil.

It is composed of the Presidency, made up of a President and two vice-presidents, and the Secretariat, which has four secretaries and four alternate secretaries. The competence of each of its members is defined in an act that must be published within 30 sessions after the composition of the Board, and they will have the competence of the previous legislative session until such act is published.

The Board meets ordinarily every two weeks and, in extraordinary session, whenever convened by the President or by four effective members.

== Responsibilities ==
Article 15 of the Chamber's Internal Regulations establishes the duties of the Chamber's Board of Directors. Among them are the following:

- Direct all services of the House during the legislative session and in its interregnums;
- Alternate with the Senate Board the position of Board of the National Congress;
- Together with the Senate Board, promulgate amendments to the Federal Constitution in a joint session of the National Congress;
- Propose an action of unconstitutionality to the Supreme Federal Court;
- Issue an opinion on the preparation of the Chamber's Internal Regulations and its amendments;
- Confer powers on its members (vice-presidents and secretaries), within 30 sessions after its composition;
- Establish guidelines for the dissemination of the Chamber's activities;
- Adopt measures to preserve and enhance the image of the Chamber of Deputies;
- Defend judicially or extrajudicially the constitutional prerogatives of Deputies;
- Set, at the beginning of the first and third legislative sessions of the legislature, after hearing the College of Leaders of the Chamber, the number of Deputies per political party or parliamentary bloc in each Standing Committee;
- Prepare, after consulting the College of Leaders and the Presidents of the Standing Committees, a draft Internal Regulations for the Committees;
- Comply with court decisions;
- Assess and forward written requests for information to Ministers of State;
- Declare the loss of the mandate of Deputy provided for in art. 55 of the Constitution;
- Apply the penalty of written censure to Deputies;
- Decide, at the appeal stage, matters relating to the legal system of the Chamber's personnel;
- Privately propose a project providing for organization, operation, police, legal regime, creation and transformation and extinction of positions, jobs and functions, in addition to setting the respective remuneration;
- Provide positions, jobs and functions;
- Grant leave, retirement and benefits, as well as make servers available;
- Request servers from direct, indirect or foundational public administration;
- Approve the budget proposal, forwarding it to the Executive Branch;
- Forward to the Executive a request for additional credit necessary for the Chamber's operation;
- Establish competence limits for expenditure authorizations;
- Authorize the signing of agreements and service provision contracts;
- Approve the Chamber's analytical budget;
- Authorize bids, approve their results and approve the purchasing calendar;
- Exercise financial oversight over subsidized entities;
- Forward the Chamber’s financial statements to the Federal Court of Auditors;
- Request police reinforcement.

== Powers ==
=== President ===
The chairman of the Board of Directors, who is also the president of the Chamber of Deputies, is the representative of the Chamber when it speaks collectively, in addition to being the supervisor of its work and its order. This position is held exclusively by a Brazilian citizen in accordance with Art. 12, § 3º of the Federal Constitution.

Furthermore, he is third in the line of presidential succession in Brazil, having occupied the position in the absence of the Vice President of the Republic, in addition to being a member of the National Defense Council and the top director of the Federal Legislative Police, responsible for the ostensive and judicial policing of the Chamber's premises.

According to Article 17 of the Chamber's Internal Regulations, the president is responsible for presiding over plenary sessions and maintaining order, granting the floor, checking the remaining time for each speaker or interlocutor, inviting the speaker to state whether they are speaking for or against a given proposition, interrupting or removing the floor from a speaker who strays from the topic or uses his or her floor to speak on a topic that has been defeated in a vote, determining that a speech or interlocution not be recorded in the minutes, inviting a Deputy to leave the room when they are disrupting order, suspending or adjourning the session, authorizing the publication of information or documents, appointing a special committee after hearing the College of Leaders, deciding on points of order, announcing the Agenda, announcing the project concluded by the Committee, submitting the matter discussed to a vote, announcing the result of the vote, declaring a project prejudicial, organizing the agenda after hearing the College of Leaders, calling sessions, breaking ties in overt votes and applying verbal censure to Deputies.

The President is also responsible for, within the scope of the Committees: appointing the full and alternate members by means of communication from the Leaders or independently of this after the statutory deadline, declaring the loss of the place of the missing Deputy, ensuring its full functioning, requesting clarifications from the Rapporteur or another member of the Committee, convening the Standing Committees for the election of their presidents and judging appeals regarding points of order and complying with and enforcing the internal regulations.

Other powers attributed to the position include: distributing the matters to be discussed among the committees, granting the withdrawal of a proposal from the Agenda, dispatching requests, determining the archiving or unarchiving of proposals, determining the publication of related material in Voz do Brasil, deciding on an extraordinary convocation of the National Congress, swearing in Deputies and granting them leave, declaring the vacancy of a Deputy's position, ensuring the prestige and decorum of the Chamber.

Due to his position, the President of the Board cannot propose a proposal as a Deputy, nor vote in the Plenary, except in the case of a secret ballot or to break a tie in an open vote. While discussing a matter, he must hand over the position to his substitute, and he cannot resume the presidency while a matter that he proposed to discuss is being debated.

=== 1st Vice President ===
In addition to replacing the president and his respective powers in the absence or impediment of the latter, the first vice-president of the Chamber is also responsible for preparing opinions on requests for information from authorities and draft resolutions of the Chamber.

=== 2nd Vice President ===
In addition to replacing the president and his respective powers in the absence or impediment of the latter and the first vice-president, the second vice-president of the Chamber is also responsible for examining and preparing opinions on requests for reimbursement of medical and hospital expenses resulting from medical or surgical assistance to federal deputies, in addition to managing the Interactive Legislation Program (PROLEGIS), an initiative between the Chamber of Deputies and the legislative assemblies of the states and Federal District and the municipal chambers, with the purpose of systematically developing legislative action.

=== Secretariat ===
The secretaries of the Board of Directors are numbered as First, Second, Third and Fourth, according to the decreasing order of the votes obtained. The four alternate secretaries are named in the same way.

In addition to overseeing administrative services, they are responsible for: receiving invitations, representations, petitions and memorials, receiving and processing correspondence, deciding in the first instance on appeals against acts of the Director General of the Chamber, interpreting the legal system of the Chamber's personnel and swearing in the Director General of the Chamber, as well as the Secretary General of the Board.

==== First Secretary ====
The First Secretary has powers related to the general administration of the Chamber, as defined in the internal regulations, some of which are:

- Accredit representatives of the press, public bodies, entities and institutions of civil society at national level to have access to the Chamber's facilities.
- Forward, after consideration by the first vice-president, requests for information from deputies to ministers of state and heads of bodies subordinate to the Presidency of the Republic .
- Forward, after preparing an opinion, recommendations from deputies to the other Powers ( Executive and Judiciary ) for the adoption of measures, such as administrative acts and requests to the Executive Power to send a legislative project of its exclusive initiative.
- Ratify Chamber expenses.
- Receive and send official correspondence from the Chamber, except for that from parliamentary committees .

==== Second Secretary ====
The Second Secretary has responsibilities related to internships, diplomacy and awards for the Chamber. He is responsible, among other functions, for promoting and supervising the internship programs of the Chamber, for organizing and holding awards ceremonies for the following awards: the Legislative Merit Medal, the Dr. Pinotti Award and others, for representing the Chamber of Deputies in its representations with the Ministry of Foreign Affairs and embassies and for supervising the issuance of diplomatic passports and visas for official missions granted to parliamentarians.

==== Third Secretary ====
The Third Secretary has powers related to absences and is responsible for authorizing the reimbursement of expenses for airfare on international trips, in accordance with article 228 of the Internal Regulations of the Chamber, and examining requests for leave and justification of absences, forwarding any omissions to the Board of Directors.

==== Fourth Secretary ====
The Fourth Secretary is responsible for housing and the residences of deputies. He is responsible for supervising the housing system of the Chamber, proposing to the Board of Directors the purchase, sale, construction and rental of properties and distributing residential units or forwarding to the General Directorate the granting of housing assistance to deputies who do not reside in official properties.

==== Substitutes ====
The substitutes, who, like the secretaries, have the designations of First, Second, Third and Fourth, according to the decreasing order of the votes obtained, are responsible for replacing the respective secretaries in their absences or impediments.

== Current composition ==
The current composition of the Board of the Chamber of Deputies is the following:

President: Hugo Motta (Republicanos-PB)
1st vice president: Altineu Côrtes (PL-RJ)
2nd vice president: Elmar Nascimento (UNIÃO-BA)
1st secretary: Carlos Veras (PT-PE)
2nd secretary: Lula da Fonte (PP-PE)
3rd secretary: Delegada Katarina (PSD-SE)
4th secretary: Sérgio Souza (MDB-PR)
1st substitute: Antonio Carlos Rodrigues (PL-SP)
2nd substitute: Paulo Folletto (PSB-ES)
3rd substitute: Victor Linhalis (PODE-ES)
4th substitute: Paulo Alexandre Barbosa (PSDB-SP)
