= 2025 President of the Chamber of Deputies of Brazil election =

- 1 February 2025

Needed to Win: Majority of the votes cast 499 votes cast, 250 needed for a majority
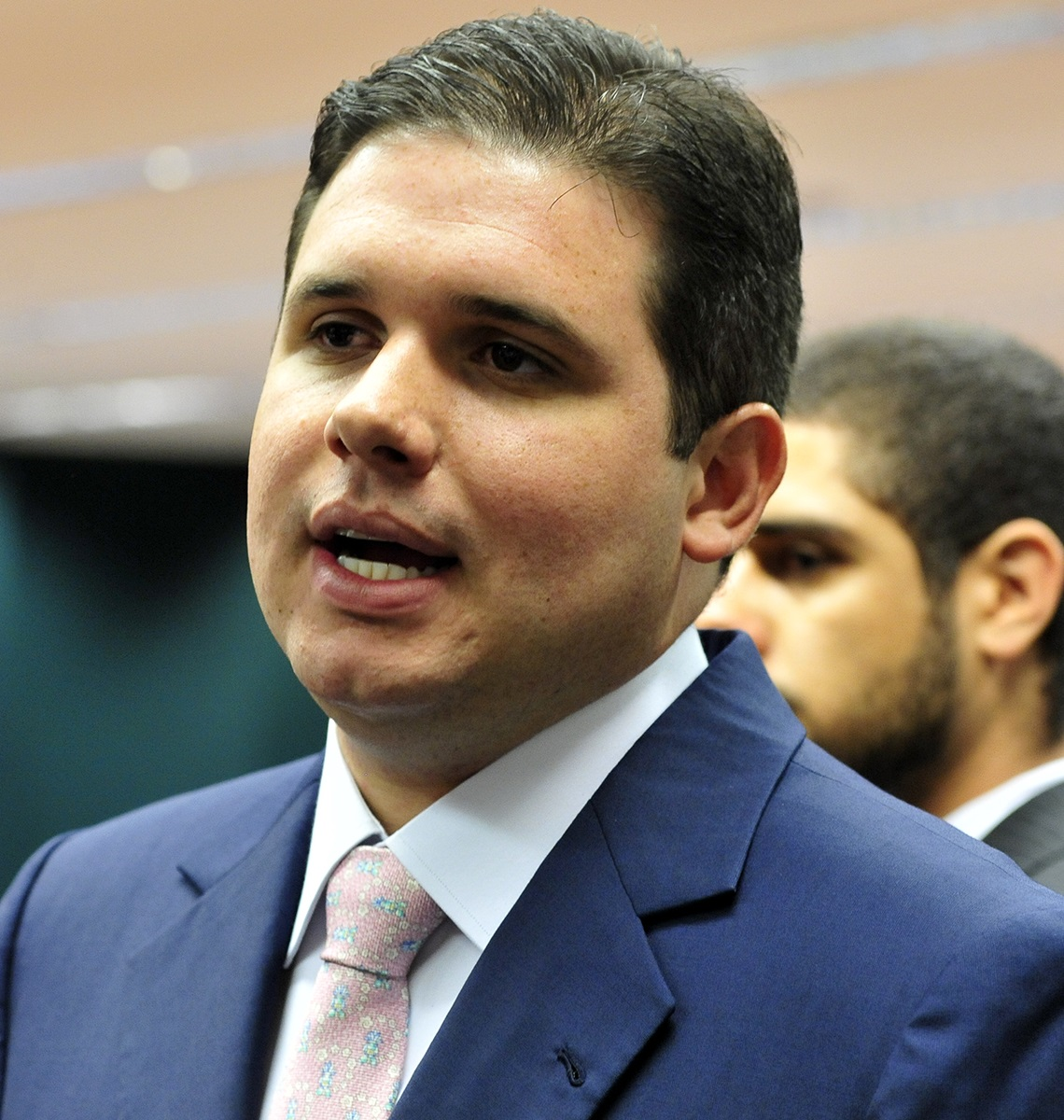

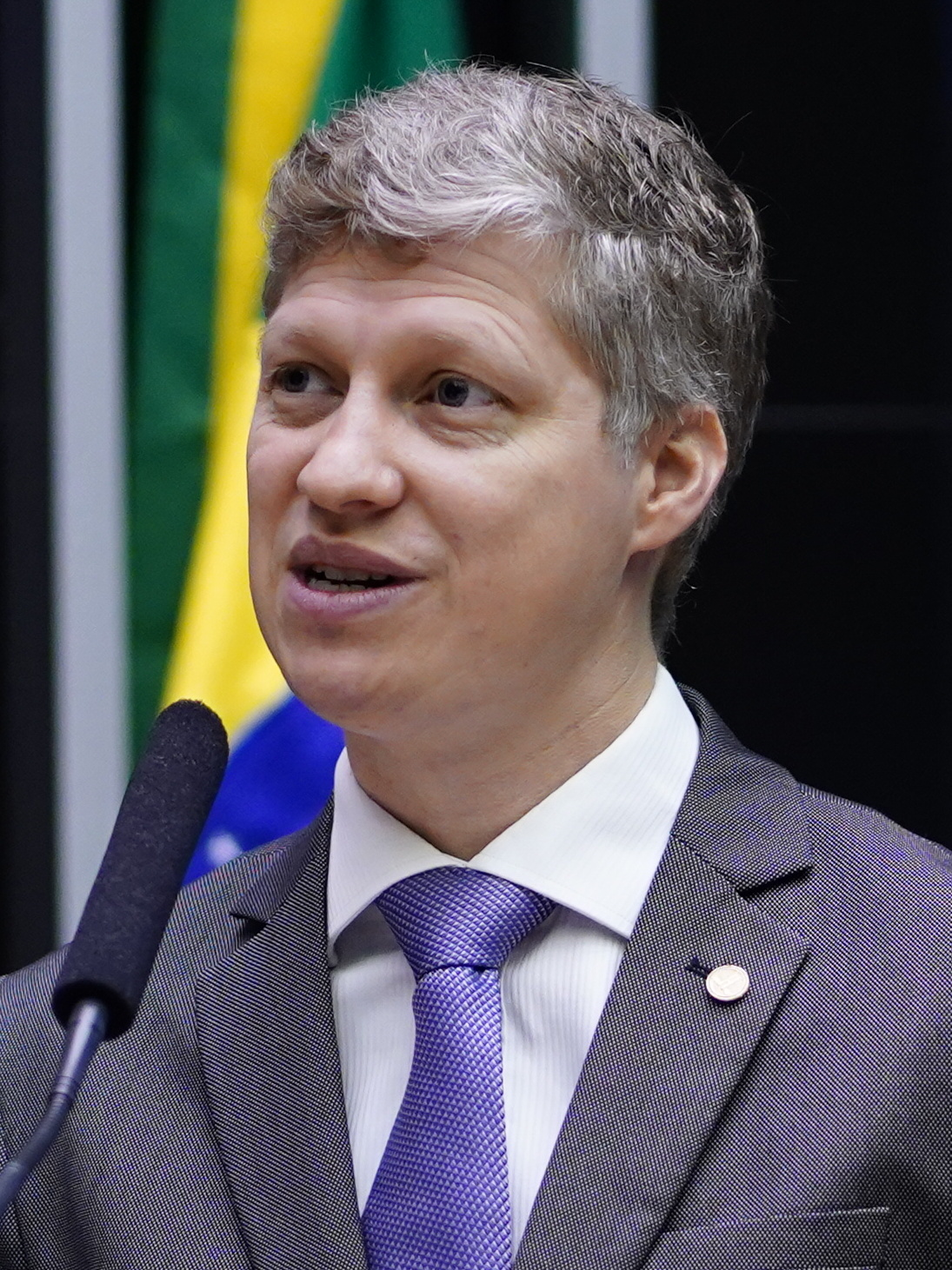

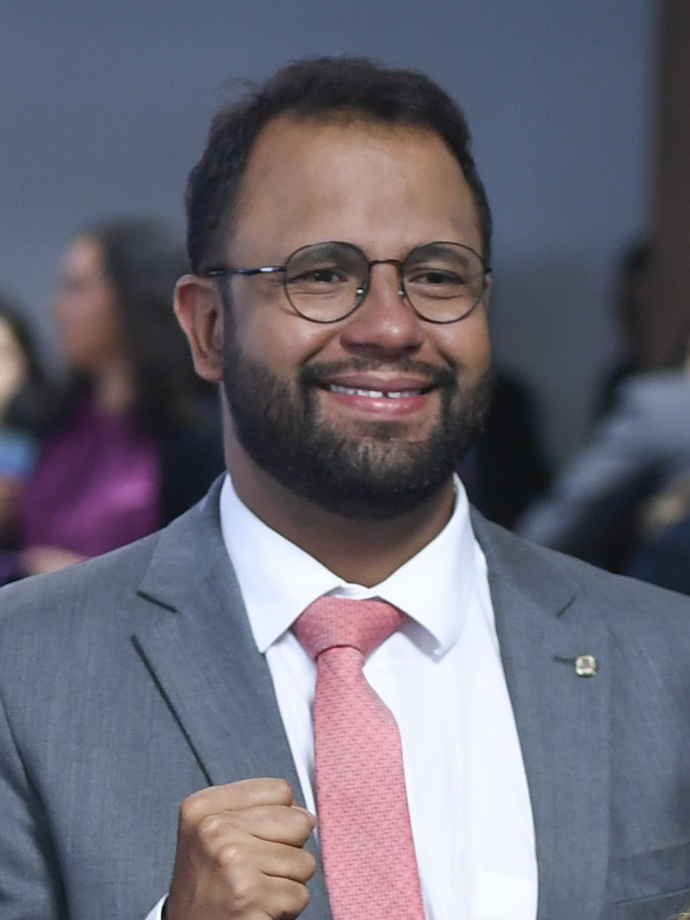
	Majority party	Minority party	Third party
Candidate	Hugo Motta	Marcel van Hattem	Henrique Vieira
Party	Republicanos	NOVO	PSOL
Leader's seat	Paraíba	Rio Grande do Sul	Rio de Janeiro
Members' vote	444	31	22
President before election
Arthur Lira
PP
Elected President
Hugo Motta
Republicanos

The 2025 President of the Chamber of Deputies of Brazil election took place on 1 February 2025, the opening day of the 3rd Session of the 57th Legislature of the National Congress. It resulted in the election of the President of the Chamber of Deputies, two vice presidents, the positions of 1st, 2nd, 3rd and 4th secretaries and their respective replacements. They will hold a biennial term (2025–2027), making it possible to be re-elected in the next Legislature - as established in Article 5th of the Chamber Statute.

The incumbent president, Arthur Lira, is not able to run for a third term. The election was carried out by secret ballot and electronic voting, requiring an absolute majority of votes, in the first ballot, and a simple majority, in the second ballot, with the absolute majority of the Deputies present - as established in Article 7th of the Chamber Statute. The Chamber President is also the second in the Brazilian presidential line of succession.

== Candidates ==
=== Potential candidates ===
- Henrique Vieira (PSOL-RJ) - Member of the Chamber from Rio de Janeiro since 2023; Councillor of Niterói 2013–2017.
- Hugo Motta (Republicanos-PB) - Member of the Chamber from Paraíba since 2011; Leader of Republicanos since 2023. Motta is endorsed by incumbent president Arthur Lira.
- Marcel van Hattem (NOVO-RS) - Member of the Chamber from Rio Grande do Sul since 2019; Leader of New Party 2019–2020.

=== Withdrawn candidates ===
- Altinêu Côrtes (PL-RJ) - Member of the Chamber from Rio de Janeiro since 2015; Leader of the Liberal Party since 2022; member of the Legislative Assembly of Rio de Janeiro 2003–2015. Côrtes was endorsed by the party and opposition members.
- Antonio Brito (PSD-BA) - Member of the Chamber from Bahia since 2011; Leader of the Social Democratic Party since 2021; Leader of the Black Caucus since 2023.
- Elmar Nascimento (UNIÃO-BA) - Member of the Chamber from Bahia since 2015; Member of the Legislative Assembly of Bahia 2003–2015. Nascimento was endorsed by incumbent president Arthur Lira.
- Marcos Pereira (Republicanos-SP) - Member of the Chamber from São Paulo since 2019; Vice President of the Chamber since 2023; Minister of Industry, Foreign Trade and Services 2016–2018; National President of Republicanos since 2011. Pereira was endorsed by the Chamber Evangelical Caucus.

== Formal voting ==
=== President ===
Candidate	Party	Votes	%
Hugo Motta (PB) ✓	Republicanos	444	89.34
Marcel van Hattem (RS)	NOVO	31	6.24
Henrique Vieira (RJ)	PSOL	22	4.43
Total		497	100.00
Valid votes		497	99.60
Invalid/blank votes		2	0.40
Total votes		499	100.00
Registered voters/turnout		513	97.27

=== First Vice President ===
Candidate	Party	Votes	%
Altineu Côrtes (SP) ✓	PL	440	100.00
Total		440	100.00
Valid votes		440	88.18
Invalid/blank votes		59	11.82
Total votes		499	100.00
Registered voters/turnout		513	97.27

=== Second Vice President ===
Candidate	Party	Votes	%
Elmar Nascimento (BA) ✓	UNIÃO	427	100.00
Total		427	100.00
Valid votes		427	85.57
Invalid/blank votes		72	14.43
Total votes		499	100.00
Registered voters/turnout		513	97.27

=== First Secretary ===
Candidate	Party	Votes	%
Carlos Veras (PE) ✓	PT	427	100.00
Total		427	100.00
Valid votes		427	85.57
Invalid/blank votes		72	14.43
Total votes		499	100.00
Registered voters/turnout		513	97.27

=== Second Secretary ===
Candidate	Party	Votes	%
Lula da Fonte (PE) ✓	PP	437	100.00
Total		437	100.00
Valid votes		437	87.58
Invalid/blank votes		62	12.42
Total votes		499	100.00
Registered voters/turnout		513	97.27

=== Third Secretary ===
Candidate	Party	Votes	%
Delegada Katarina (SE) ✓	PSD	445	100.00
Total		445	100.00
Valid votes		445	89.18
Invalid/blank votes		54	10.82
Total votes		499	100.00
Registered voters/turnout		513	97.27

=== Fourth Secretary ===
Candidate	Party	Votes	%
Sérgio Souza (PR) ✓	MDB	432	100.00
Total		432	100.00
Valid votes		432	86.57
Invalid/blank votes		67	13.43
Total votes		499	100.00
Registered voters/turnout		513	97.27

=== Substitute Secretaries ===
For this election, a block voting system is used, as all of the members of the Chamber vote in 4 candidates at the same time.

Candidate	Party	Votes	%
Victor Linhalis (ES) ✓	PODE	388	25.15
Antonio Carlos Rodrigues (SP) ✓	PL	395	25.60
Paulo Folletto (ES) ✓	PSB	389	25.21
Paulo Alexandre Barbosa (SP) ✓	PSDB	371	24.04
Total		1,543	100.00
Valid votes		1,543	77.30
Invalid/blank votes		453	22.70
Total votes		1,996	100.00
