= Brazilian National Congress =

Bicameral federal legislature of Brazil

Coordinates: 15°47′59″S 47°51′51″W

National Congress Congresso Nacional
- 57th Legislature of the National Congress

Type
- Type: Bicameral
- Houses: Federal Senate; Chamber of Deputies

History
- Founded: 6 May 1826
- New session started: 1 February 2025

Leadership
- President of the Federal Senate: Davi Alcolumbre, UNIÃO since 1 February 2025
- President of the Chamber of Deputies: Hugo Motta, Republicans since 1 February 2025
- Government Leader: Randolfe Rodrigues, PT since 3 January 2023
- Majority Leader: Aguinaldo Ribeiro, PP since 19 April 2024
- Opposition Leader: Izalci Lucas, PL since 20 June 2026
- Minority Leader: Bia Kicis, PL since 30 March 2026

Structure
- Seats: 594 members: 81 senators; 513 federal deputies
- Federal Senate political groups: Government (40): PSD (14); MDB (9); PT (9); PSB (7); PDT (1); Opposition (23): PL (15); PSDB (4); PODE (3); Avante (1); Independent (18): PP (8); Republicanos (6); UNIÃO (3); No party (1)
- Chamber of Deputies political groups: Government (207): Brazil of Hope (83) (Note: PT (66); PCdoB (11); PV (6)); PSD (48); MDB (38); PSB (17); PSOL-REDE (16) (Note: PSOL (13); REDE (3)); Avante (5); Opposition (150): PL (98); PODE (27); PSDB-Cidadania (19) (Note: PSDB (17); Cidadania (2)); NOVO (5); MISSÃO (1); Independent (156): UPB (97) (Note: UNIÃO (50); PP (47)); Republicanos (43); PDT (9); Solidary Renewal (7) (Note: Solidariedade (4); PRD (3))

Elections
- Federal Senate voting system: Plurality voting, alternating every four years between single-member elections (FPTP) and dual-member elections (Block voting)
- Chamber of Deputies voting system: Open list proportional representation (D'Hondt method) with a 2% election threshold
- Last general election: 4 October 2026
- Next general election: 4 October 2030

Meeting place
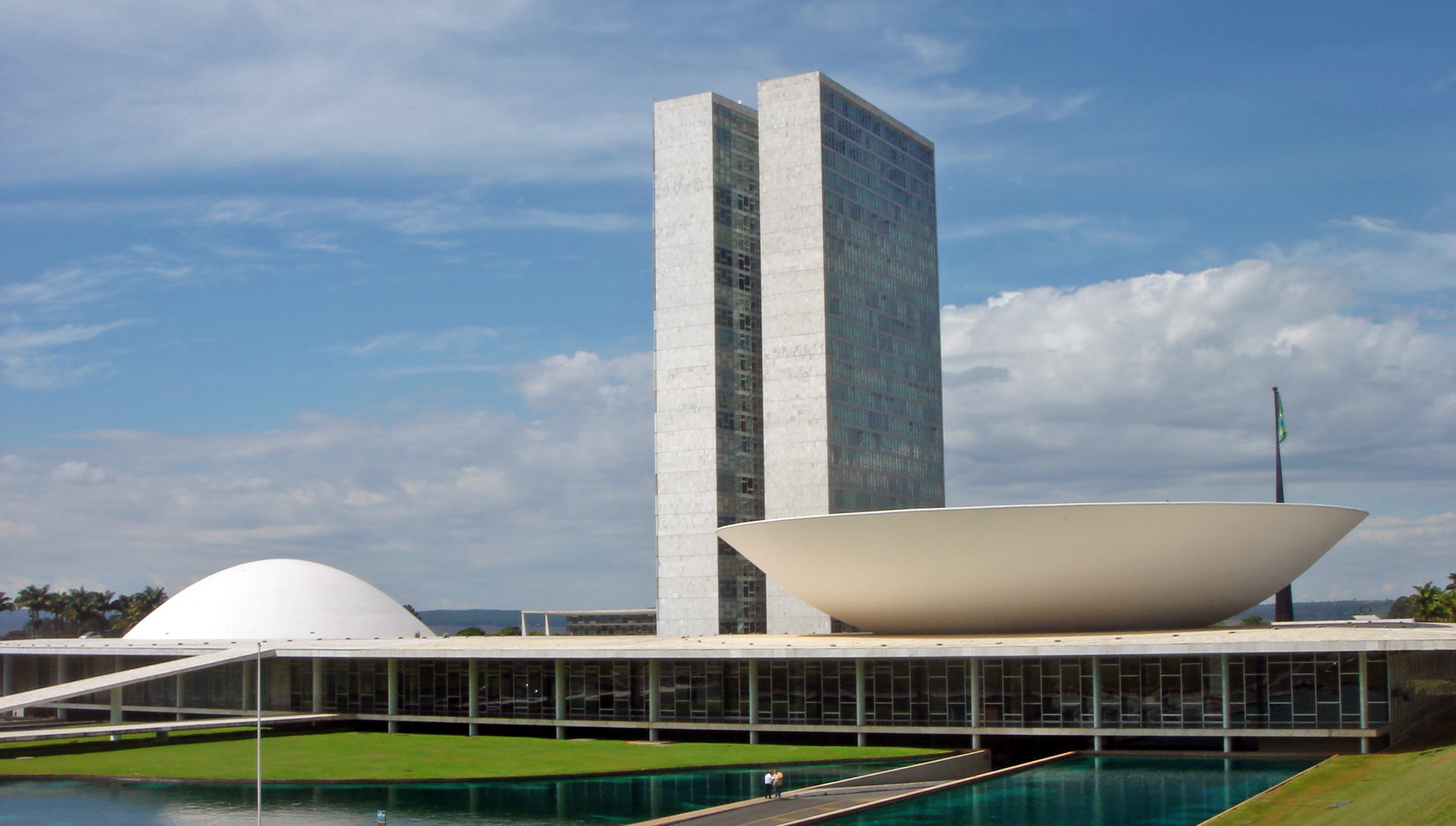
- Nereu Ramos Palace, Brasília, Federal District, Brazil

Website
- www.congressonacional.leg.br

The National Congress (Portuguese: Congresso Nacional) is the legislative body of Brazil's federal government. Unlike the state legislative assemblies and municipal chambers, the Congress is bicameral, composed of the Federal Senate (the upper house) and the Chamber of Deputies (the lower house). The Congress meets annually in Brasília from 2 February to 22 December, with a mid-term break taking place between 17 July and 1 August.

The Senate represents the 26 states and the Federal District. Each state and the Federal District has a representation of three senators, who are elected by popular ballot for a term of eight years. Every four years, renewal of either one third or two-thirds of the Senate (and of the delegations of the States and the Federal District) takes place. The Chamber of Deputies represents the people of each state, and its members are elected for a four-year term by a system of proportional representation. Seats are allotted proportionally according to each state's population, with each state eligible for a minimum of 8 seats (least populous) and a maximum of 70 seats (most populous). Unlike the Senate, the whole of the Chamber of Deputies is renewed every four years.

Until recently it was common for politicians to switch parties and the proportion of congressional seats held by each party would often change. Seats belong to the parties and not to the politicians; one can only change parties and retain their seat in a very limited set of cases. Politicians who abandon the party for which they were elected now face the loss of their congressional seat. Each house of the Brazilian Congress elects its president and the other members of its directing board from among its members. The President of the Senate is ex officio the President of the National Congress, and in that capacity summons and presides over joint sessions, as well as over the joint services of both houses. The President of the Chamber is second in the presidential line of succession while the President of the Senate (and of Congress) is third.

== Board of the National Congress ==
The current composition of the Board of the National Congress is as follows:

Office	Name	Party	State
President	Davi Alcolumbre	UNIÃO	Amapá
1st Vice-President	Altineu Côrtes	PL	Rio de Janeiro
2nd Vice-President	Humberto Costa	PT	Pernambuco
1st Secretary	Carlos Veras	PT	Pernambuco
2nd Secretary	Confúcio Moura	MDB	Rondônia
3rd Secretary	Delegada Katarina	PSD	Sergipe
4th Secretary	Laércio Oliveira	PP	Sergipe

== Houses ==
=== Federal Senate ===
The Federal Senate (Portuguese: Senado Federal) is the upper house of the National Congress created by the first Constitution of the Brazilian Empire in 1824; it was inspired by United Kingdom's House of Lords, but with the Proclamation of the Republic in 1889 it became closer to the United States Senate. Currently, the Senate comprises 81 seats. Three senators from each of the 26 states and three senators from the Federal District are elected on a majority basis to serve eight-year terms. Elections are staggered so that two-thirds of the upper house is up for election at one time and the remaining one-third four years later. When one seat is up for election in each State, each voter casts one vote for the Senate; when two seats are up for election, each voter casts two votes, and the voter cannot give his two votes for the same candidate, but, in elections for the renewal of two-thirds of the Senate, each party can present two candidates for election. The candidate in each State and the Federal District (or the first two candidates, when two-thirds of the seats are up for election) who achieve the greatest plurality of votes are elected.

=== Chamber of Deputies ===
The Chamber of Deputies (Câmara dos Deputados) is the lower house of the National Congress, it is composed of 513 federal deputies, who are elected by a proportional representation of votes to serve a four-year term. Seats are allotted proportionally according to each state's population, with each state eligible for a minimum of 8 seats (least populous) and a maximum of 70 seats (most populous).

In 2018, 24 out of the country's 33 political parties were able to elect at least one representative in the Chamber, while sixteen of them were able to elect at least one senator.

See the Latest election section for election results table.

== Building ==
In early 1900s, the Brazilian National Congress happened to be in separate buildings in Rio de Janeiro which was then the national capital. The Senate was located near Railway Central Station, beside the Republica Square, at Moncorvo Filho Street, where there is today a Federal University of Rio de Janeiro students' center. The Federal Chamber of Deputies was located at Misericórdia Street, which would later be the location of the State of Rio de Janeiro's local Chamber of Deputies. From the 1930s to early 1960s, the Senate occupied the Monroe Palace, which was demolished in the 1970s to allow the construction of the subway Cinelândia Station. The Federal Chamber of Deputies moved to Brasília in the early 1960s, a process that took years to complete.

Since the 1960s, the National Congress has been located in Brasília. Like most of the city's government buildings, the National Congress building was designed by Oscar Niemeyer.

The semi-sphere on the left is the seat of the Senate, and the semi-sphere on the right is the seat of the Chamber of the Deputies. Between them are two vertical office towers.

The building is located in the middle of the Monumental Axis, the main street of Brasília. In front of it there is a large lawn where demonstrations take place. At the back of it, is the Praça dos Três Poderes ('Three Powers Plaza'), where lies the Palácio do Planalto and the Supreme Federal Court.

On 6 December 2007, the Institute of Historic and Artistic National Heritage (Instituto do Patrimônio Histórico e Artístico Nacional) decided to declare the building of the National Congress a historical heritage of the Brazilian people. The building has also been a UNESCO World Heritage Site, as part of Brasília's original urban buildings, since 1987.

=== Invasions of the National Congress Building ===
The National Congress of Brazil has been the focal point of major protests and invasions, reflecting periods of political and social unrest. In June 2013, during the "Jornadas de Junho" (June Journeys), over two million Brazilians protested against public transport fare hikes and government corruption, with demonstrators symbolically occupying the Congress dome in Brasília. On 8 January Brasília attacks, supporters of President Jair Bolsonaro, disputing the 2022 election results, stormed the Congress, Supreme Court, and Presidential Palace, causing extensive damage and drawing international condemnation. In April 2025, approximately 8,000 Indigenous people from 150 ethnic groups gathered in Brasília to protest legislative measures perceived as threats to their land rights. The demonstration escalated when protesters breached security barriers and occupied the lawn in front of the National Congress, leading to police intervention. These events underscore the National Congress's central role in Brazil's democratic processes and its significance as a site of civil activism.

== Gallery ==
=== National Congress building ===
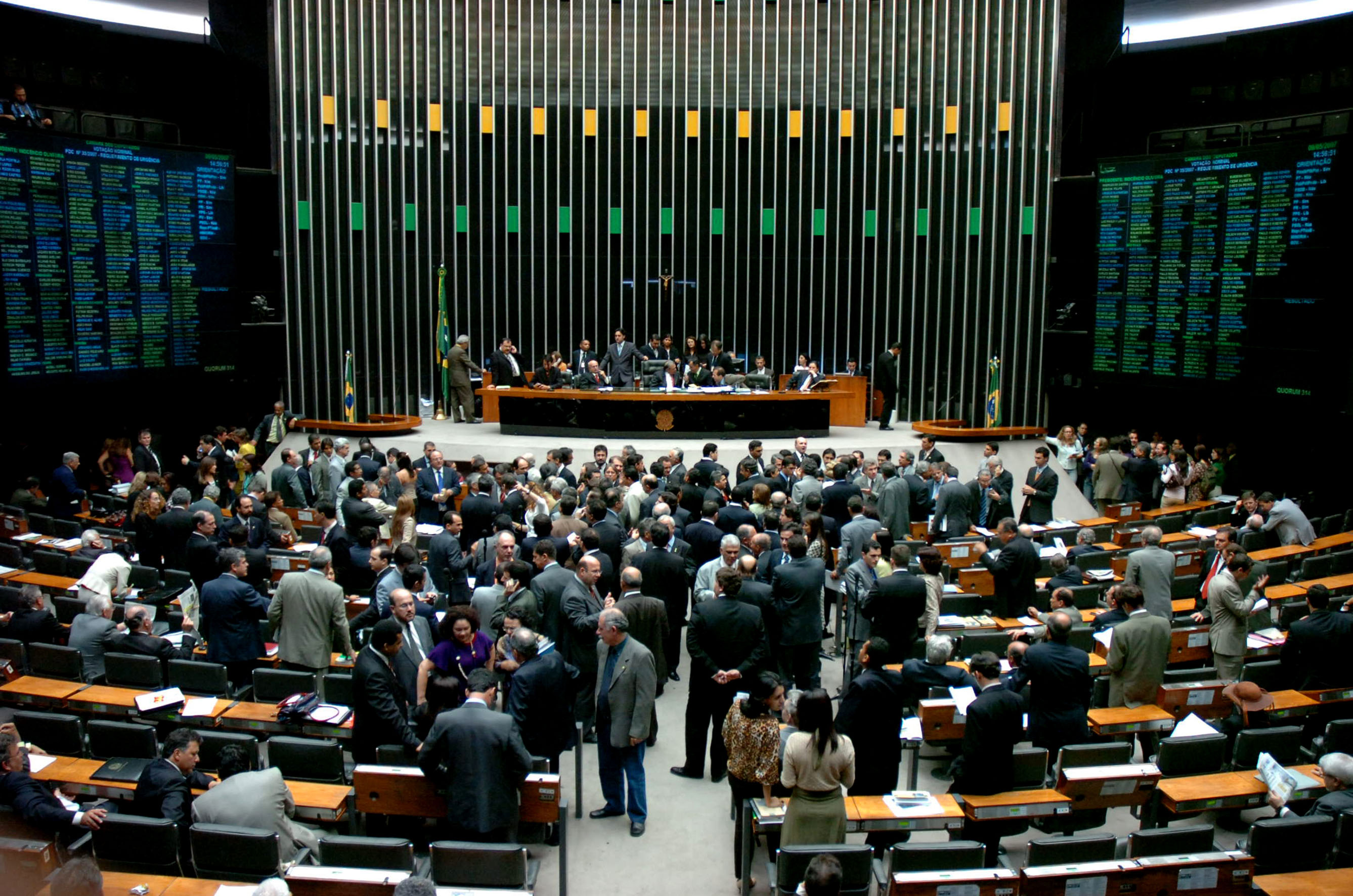
Chamber of Deputies

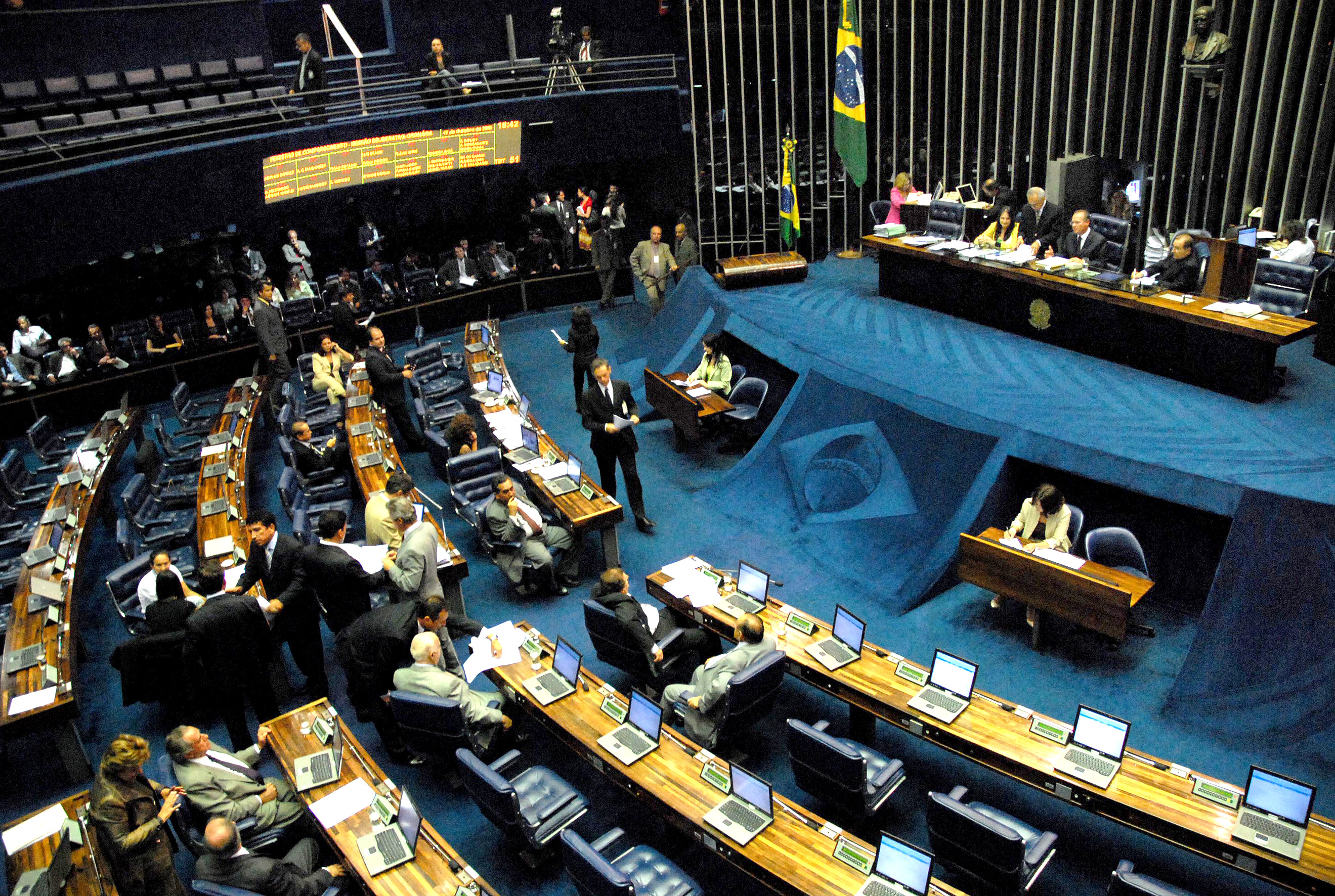
Federal Senate

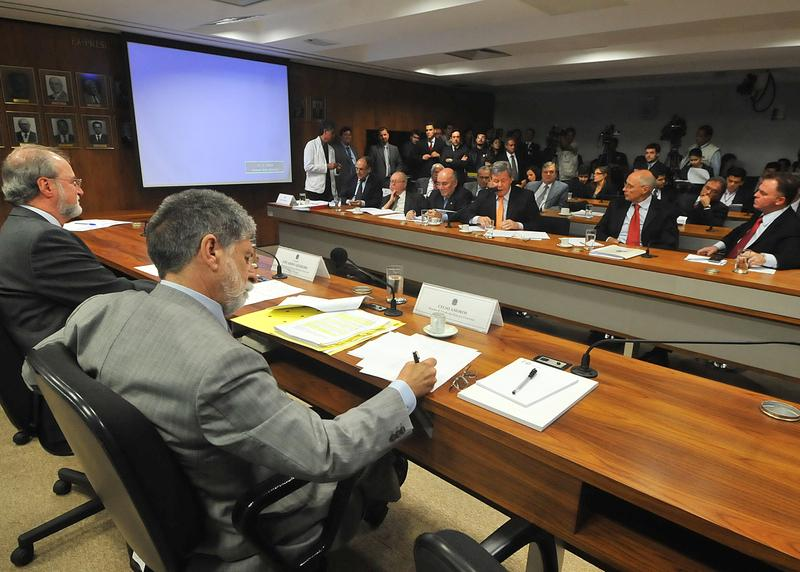
Committee room

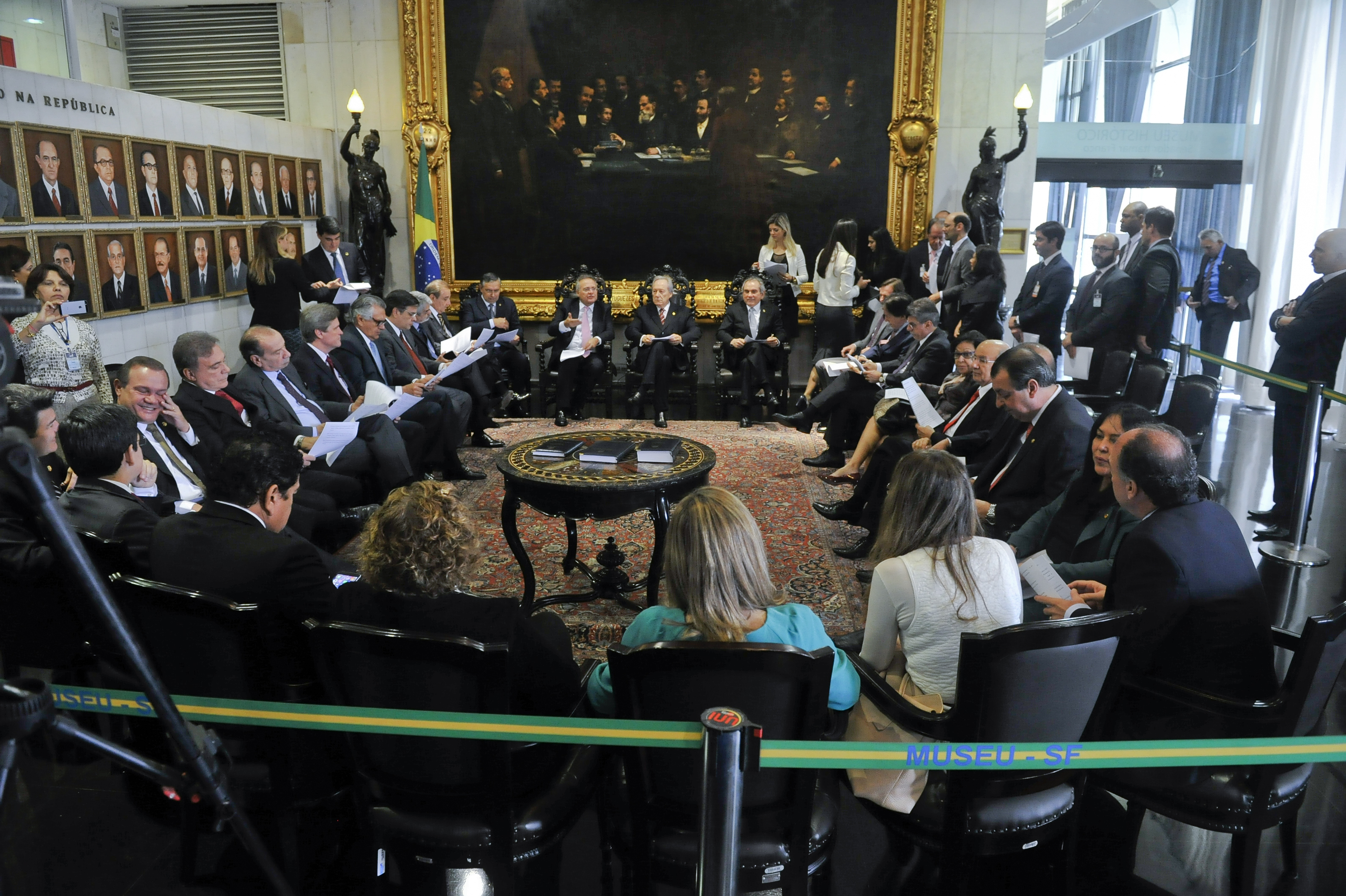
Noble Room of the Senate

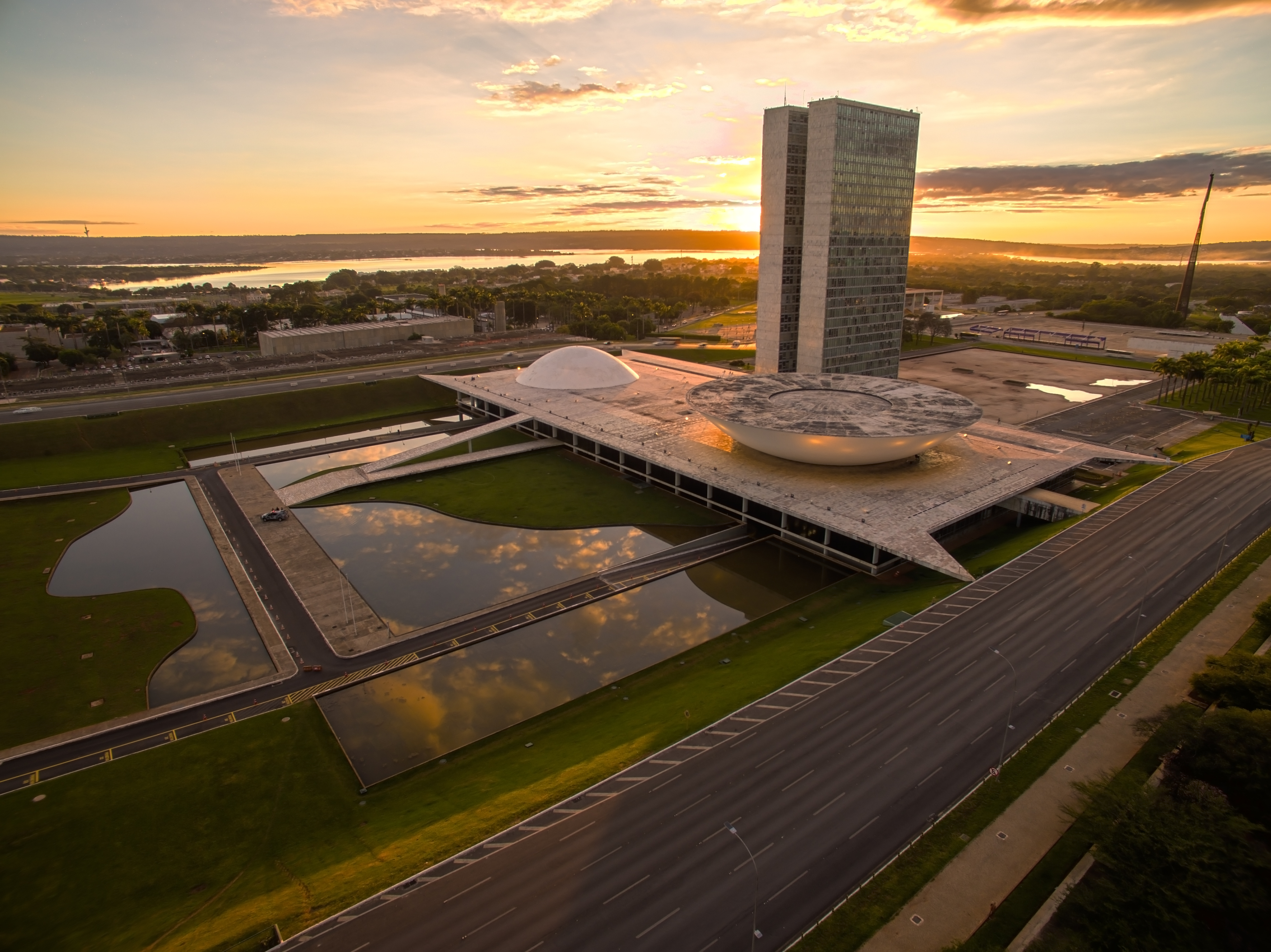
Aerial view

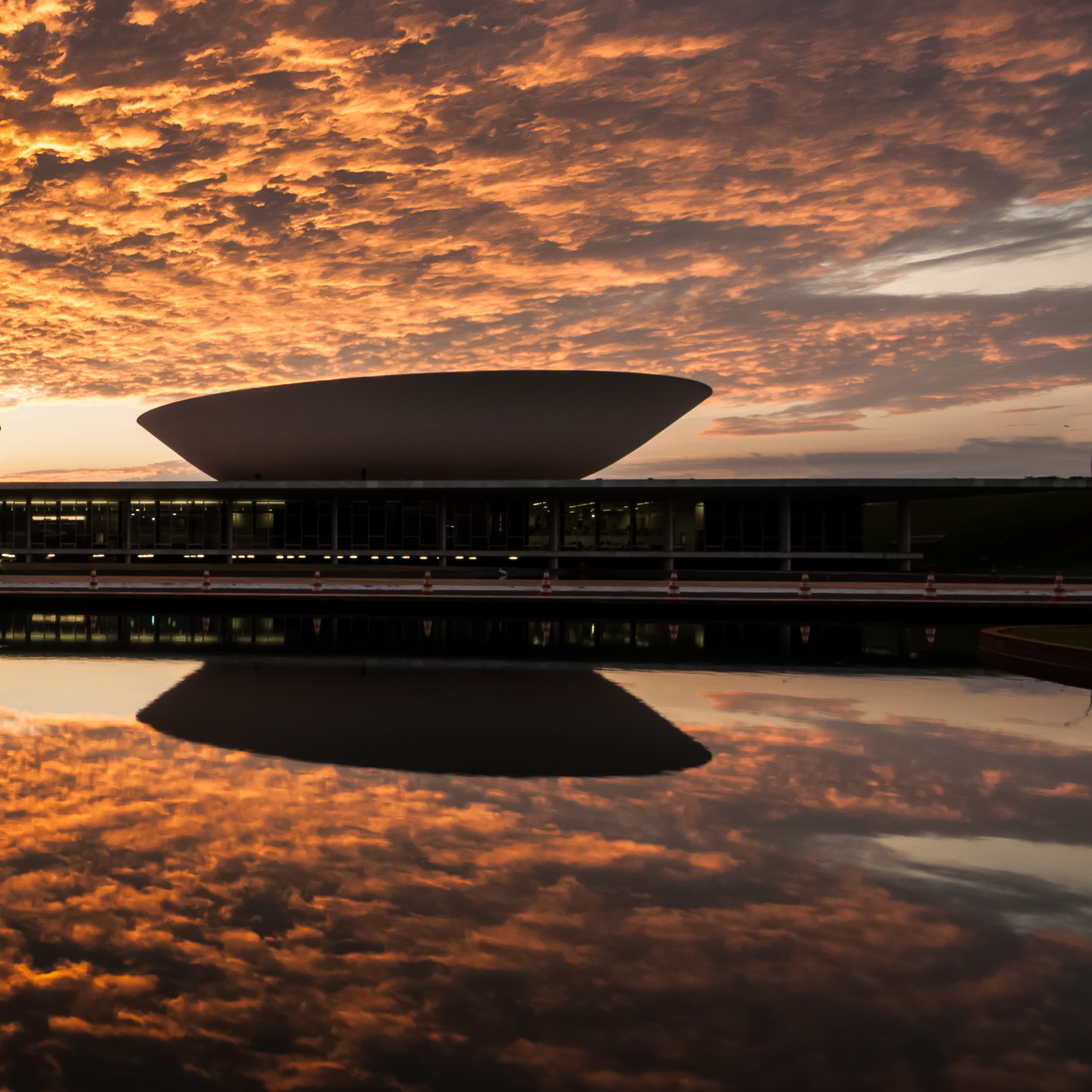
Exterior view of the Chamber of Deputies

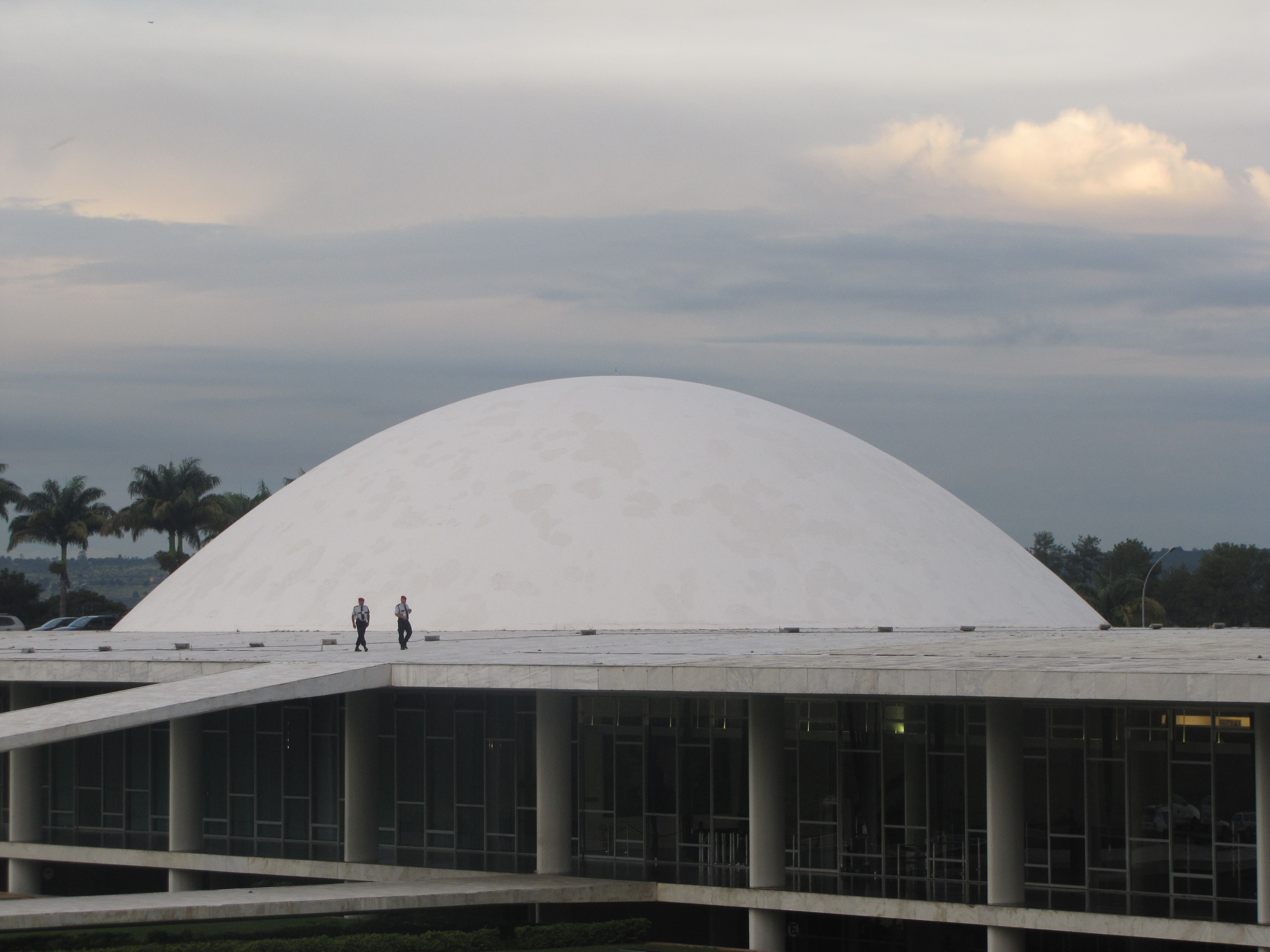
Exterior view of the Senate chamber

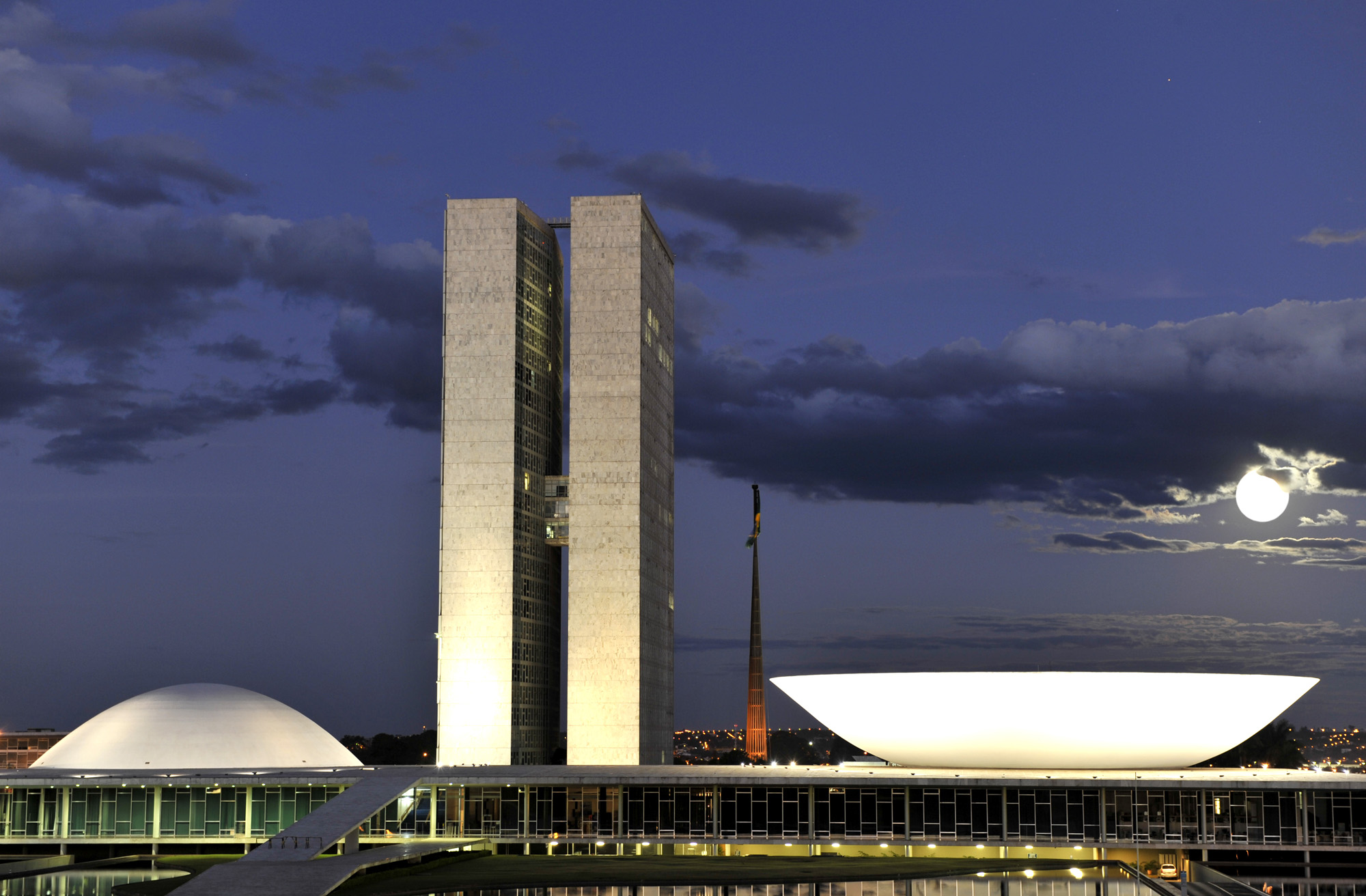
The National Congress building at night

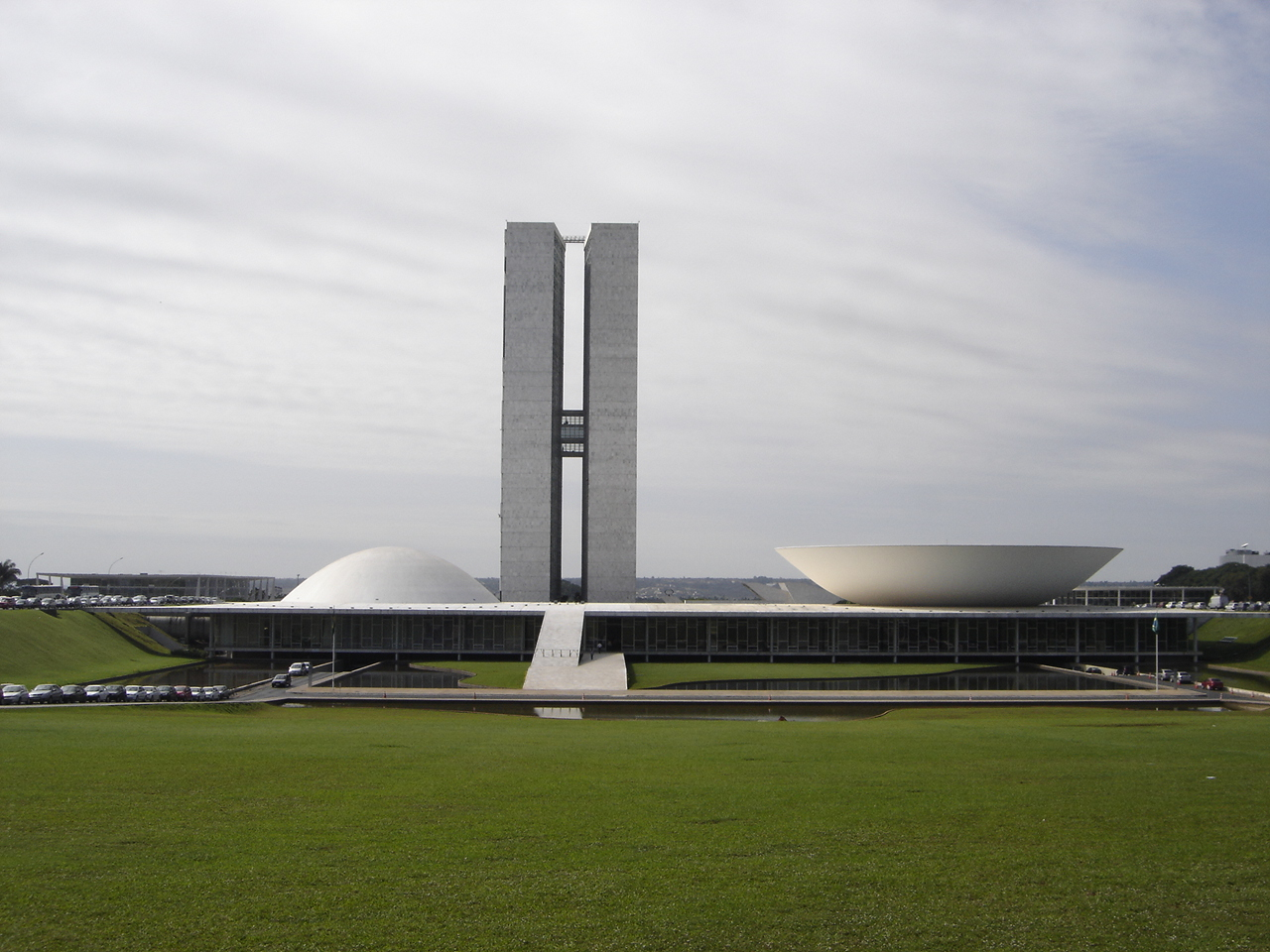
Front façade and lawn, showing the twin towers

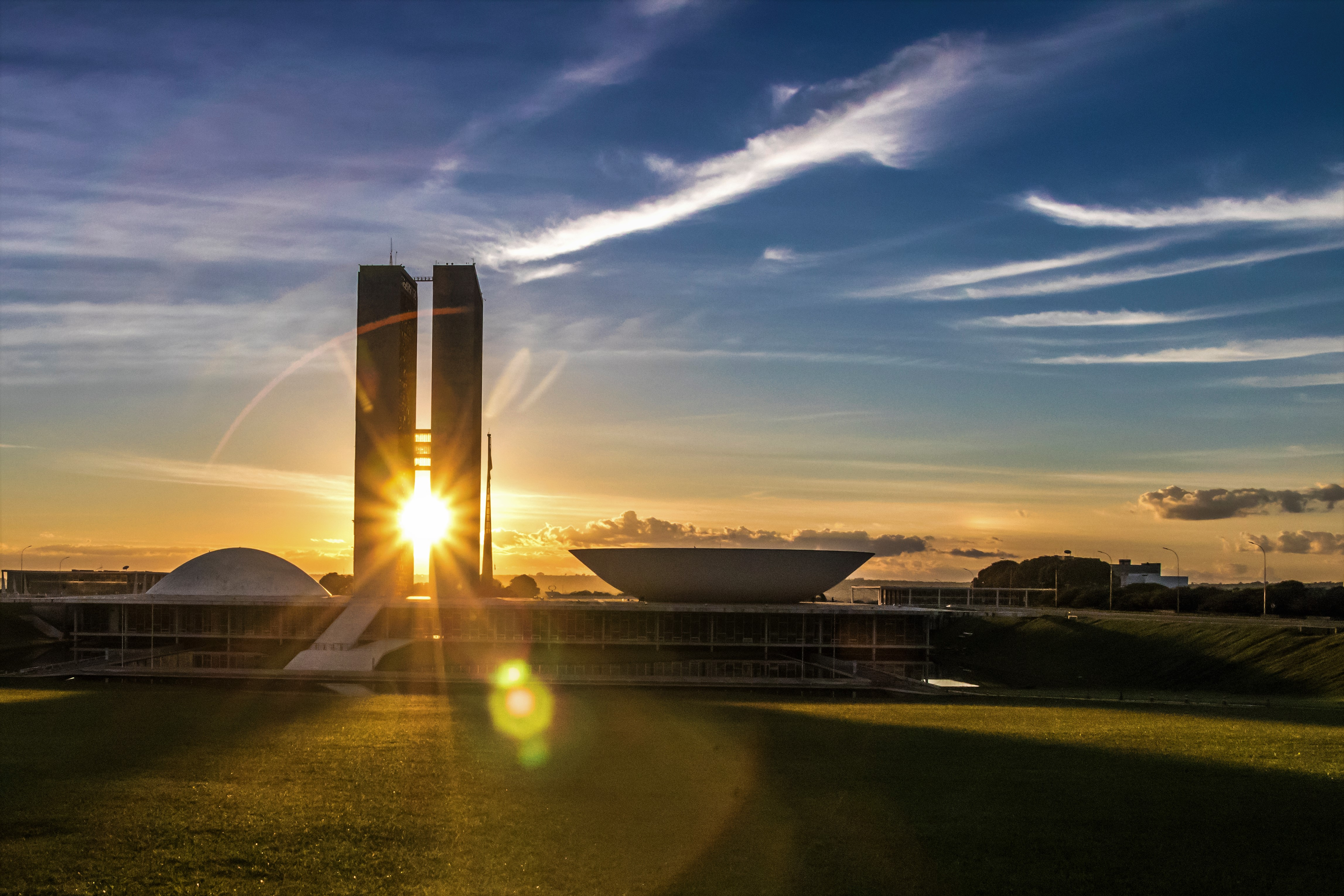
The Congress as seen from the Monumental Axis

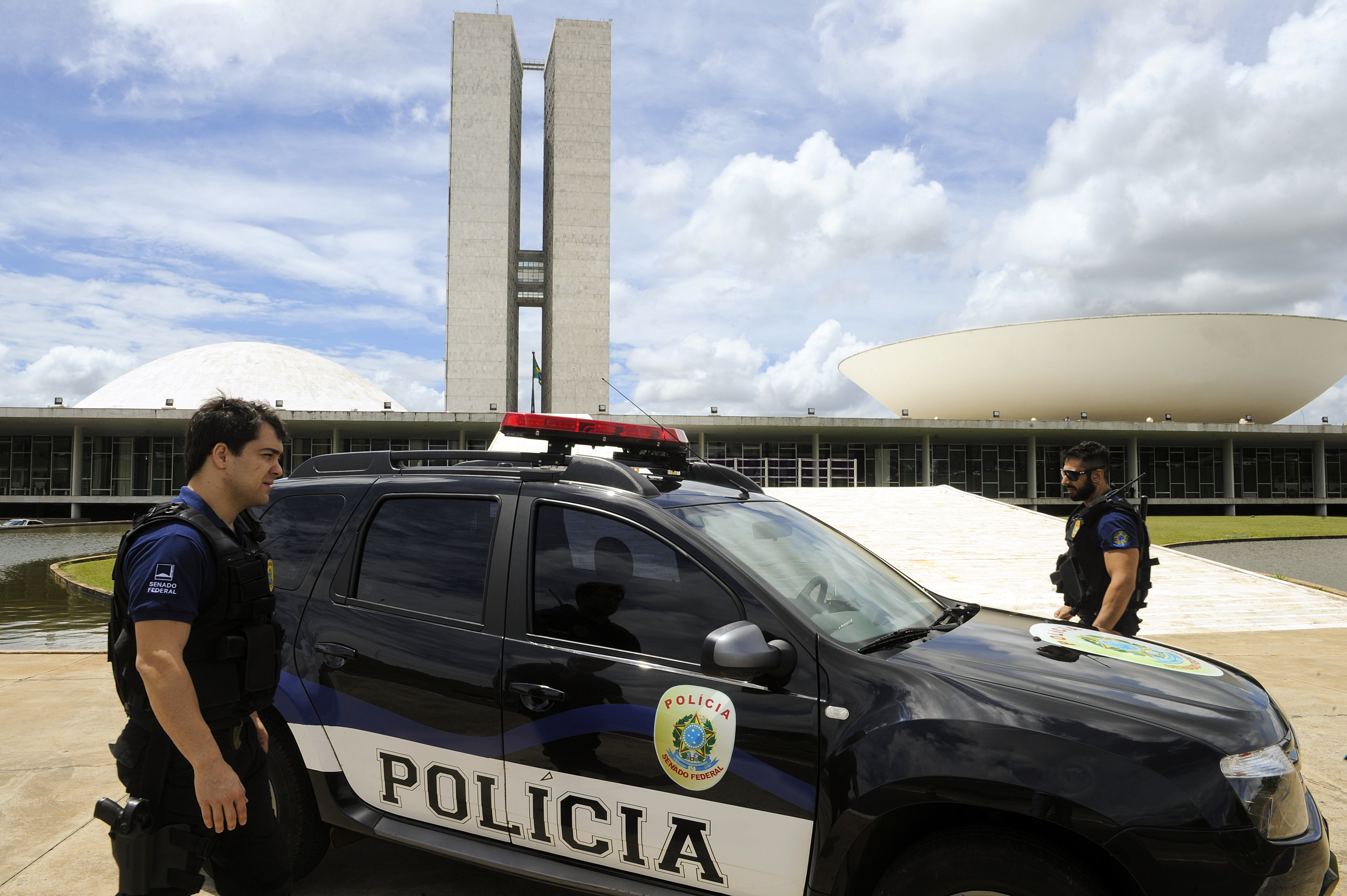
Legislative police officers outside the National Congress building

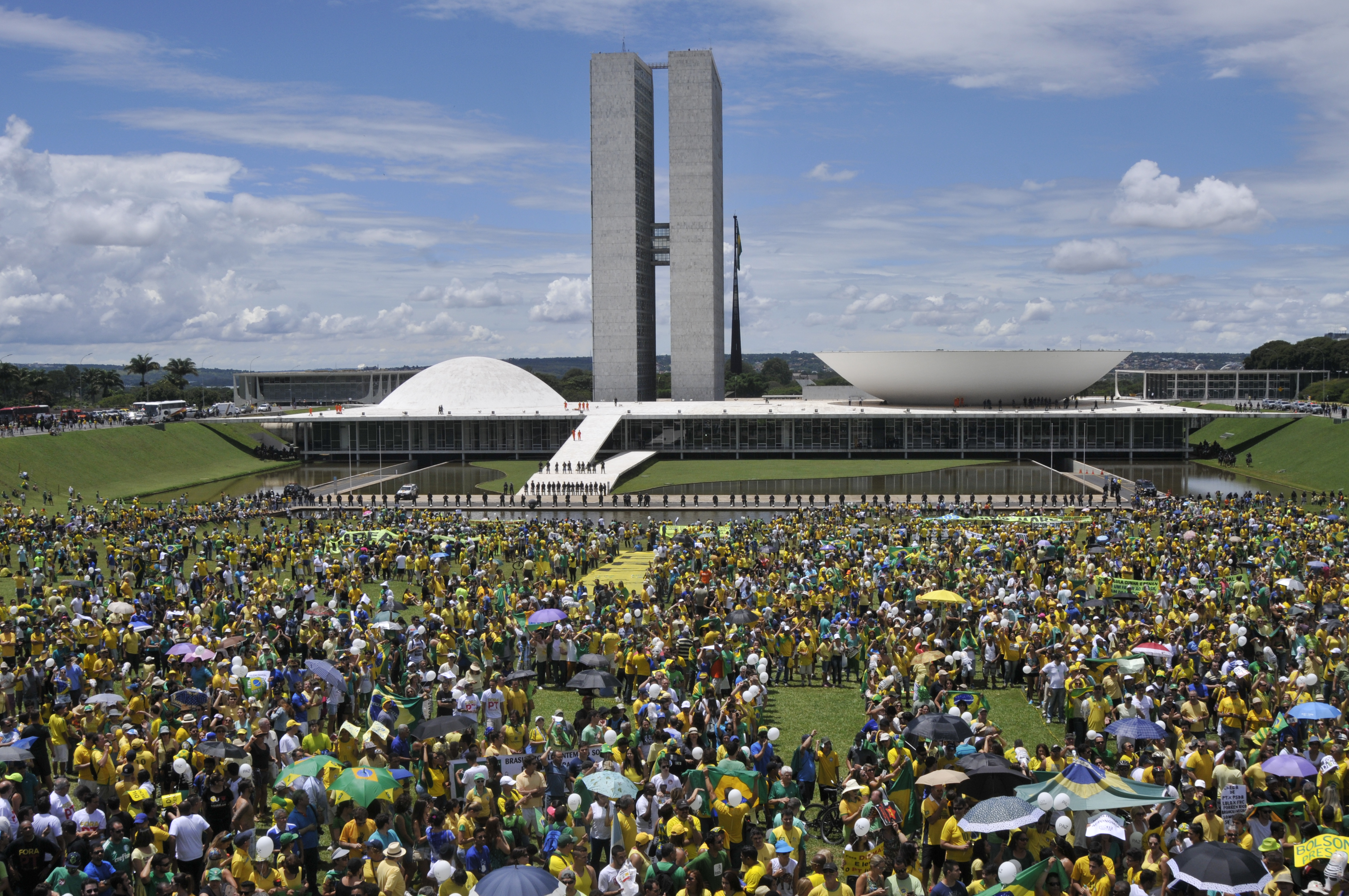
Protesters during an anti-government demonstration in front of the Congress, 13 March 2016

== Latest election ==
=== Chamber of Deputies ===
Party or alliance		Votes	%	Seats	+/–
Liberal Party		18,201,246	16.62	99	+66 (Note: Compared to the deputies of the Party of the Republic elected in 2018. The party was renamed Liberal Party in 2019.)
Brazil of Hope	Workers' Party	13,170,626	12.02	67	+11
Brazil of Hope	Communist Party of Brazil	1,154,712	1.05	6	–4 (Note: Compared to the combined deputies of the Communist Party of Brazil and of the Free Fatherland Party elected in 2018. The parties merged after that election.)
Brazil of Hope	Green Party	954,578	0.87	6	+2
Brazil Union		10,198,288	9.31	59	–22 (Note: Compared to the combined deputies of the Social Liberal Party and of Democrats elected in 2018. The parties merged to form Brazil Union in 2022.)
Progressistas		8,692,918	7.94	47	+10
Social Democratic Party		8,293,956	7.57	42	+8
Brazilian Democratic Movement		7,870,810	7.18	42	+8
Republicans		7,610,894	6.95	41	+11 (Note: Compared to the deputies of the Brazilian Republican Party elected in 2018. The party was renamed Republicans in 2019.)
Always; Forward	Brazilian Social Democracy Party	3,309,061	3.02	13	–16
Always; Forward	Cidadania	1,614,106	1.47	5	–3 (Note: Compared to the deputies of the Popular Socialist Party elected in 2018. The party was renamed Cidadania in 2019.)
PSOL; REDE	Socialism and Liberty Party	3,856,031	3.52	12	+2
PSOL; REDE	Sustainability Network	783,601	0.72	2	+1
Brazilian Socialist Party		4,172,383	3.81	14	–18
Democratic Labour Party		3,828,289	3.49	17	–11
Podemos		3,610,634	3.30	12	–5 (Note: Compared to the combined deputies of Podemos and of the Humanist Party of Solidarity elected in 2018. The parties merged after that election.)
Avante		2,175,355	1.99	7	0
Social Christian Party		1,944,678	1.78	6	–2
Solidarity		1,697,127	1.55	4	–9
Patriota		1,526,570	1.39	4	–5 (Note: Compared to the combined deputies of Patriota and of the Progressive Republican Party elected in 2018. The parties merged after that election.)
Brazilian Labour Party		1,422,652	1.30	1	–9
New Party		1,354,754	1.24	3	–5
Republican Party of the Social Order		1,042,698	0.95	4	–4
Brazilian Labour Renewal Party		288,027	0.26	0	0
Party of National Mobilization		256,578	0.23	0	–3
Act		158,622	0.14	0	–2 (Note: Compared to the deputies of the Christian Labour Party elected in 2018. The party was renamed Act in 2022.)
Christian Democracy		97,741	0.09	0	–1
Brazilian Communist Party		85,511	0.08	0	0
Brazilian Woman's Party		83,055	0.08	0	0
Popular Unity		54,586	0.05	0	New
United Socialist Workers' Party		27,995	0.03	0	0
Workers' Cause Party		7,308	0.01	0	0
Total		109,545,390	100.00	513	0
Valid votes		109,545,390	88.92		
Invalid votes		6,149,056	4.99		
Blank votes		7,501,125	6.09		
Total votes		123,195,571	100.00		
Registered voters/turnout		155,557,503	79.20		
Source: Superior Electoral Court

=== Federal Senate ===
Party or alliance		Votes	%	Seats		
Party or alliance		Votes	%	Elected	Total	+/–
Liberal Party		25,278,764	25.39	8	13	+11 (Note: Compared to the senators of the Party of the Republic elected in 2018 or not up for election in 2018. The party was renamed Liberal Party in 2019.)
Brazilian Socialist Party		13,615,846	13.67	1	1	–1
Brazil of Hope	Workers' Party	12,024,696	12.08	4	9	+3
Brazil of Hope	Green Party	475,597	0.48	0	0	0
Brazil of Hope	Communist Party of Brazil	299,013	0.30	0	0	0
Social Democratic Party		11,312,512	11.36	2	10	+3
Progressistas		7,592,391	7.62	3	7	+2
Brazil Union		5,465,486	5.49	5	12	+2 (Note: Compared to the combined senators of Democrats and of the Social Liberal Party elected in 2018 or not up for election in 2018. The parties merged to form Brazil Union in 2022.)
Social Christian Party		4,285,485	4.30	1	1	0
Republicans		4,259,279	4.28	2	3	+2 (Note: Compared to the senators of the Brazilian Republican Party elected in 2018 or not up for election in 2018. The party was renamed Republicans in 2019.)
Brazilian Democratic Movement		3,882,458	3.90	1	10	–2
Brazilian Labour Party		2,046,003	2.05	0	0	–3
Podemos		1,776,283	1.78	0	6	–1 (Note: Compared to the combined senators of Podemos and of the Humanist Party of Solidarity elected in 2018 or not up for election in 2018. The parties merged after that election.)
Democratic Labour Party		1,586,922	1.59	0	2	–2
Always; Forward	Brazilian Social Democracy Party	1,384,871	1.39	0	4	–5
Always; Forward	Cidadania	0	0.00	0	1	–1 (Note: Compared to the senators of the Popular Socialist Party elected in 2018 or not up for election in 2018. The party was renamed Cidadania in 2019.)
Avante		1,359,455	1.37	0	0	0
Brazilian Labour Renewal Party		758,938	0.76	0	0	0
PSOL; REDE	Socialism and Liberty Party	675,244	0.68	0	0	0
PSOL; REDE	Sustainability Network	8,133	0.01	0	1	–4
New Party		479,593	0.48	0	0	0
Popular Unity		291,294	0.29	0	0	New
Republican Party of the Social Order		213,247	0.21	0	1	0
United Socialist Workers' Party		132,680	0.13	0	0	0
Christian Democracy		94,098	0.09	0	0	0
Patriota		76,729	0.08	0	0	–1 (Note: Compared to the combined senators of Patriota and of the Progressive Republican Party elected in 2018 or not up for election in 2018. The parties merged after that election.)
Brazilian Communist Party		64,569	0.06	0	0	0
Brazilian Woman's Party		61,350	0.06	0	0	0
Party of National Mobilization		27,812	0.03	0	0	0
Act		24,076	0.02	0	0	–1 (Note: Compared to the senators of the Christian Labour Party elected in 2018 or not up for election in 2018. The party was renamed Act in 2022.)
Solidarity		17,339	0.02	0	0	–1
Workers' Cause Party		5,572	0.01	0	0	0
Independent		0	0.00	0	0	–1
Total		99,575,735	100.00	27	81	0
Valid votes		99,575,735	80.83			
Invalid votes		14,279,527	11.59			
Blank votes		9,340,309	7.58			
Total votes		123,195,571	100.00			
Registered voters/turnout		155,557,503	79.20			
Source: Superior Electoral Court

== Legislatures ==
The legislatures are counted from the first meeting of the Chamber of Deputies and of the Senate, on 6 May 1826, in the imperial era (the Chamber of Deputies met for preparatory sessions from 29 April 1826 onwards to elect its officers and conduct other preliminary business, but the legislature was formally opened on 6 May). The Chamber of Deputies and the Senate were created by Brazil's first Constitution, the Constitution of the Empire of Brazil, adopted in 1824. The previous Constituent and Legislative Assembly of the Empire of Brazil, a unicameral National Assembly, that was convened in 1823 and dissolved by Emperor Pedro I before adopting a Constitution is not counted among the legislatures. Thus, the numbering includes only the bicameral legislatures that existed from 1826 to the present day, and includes only legislatures elected after the adoption of the first Brazilian Constitution.

In the imperial era, the national legislature was named General Assembly. It was made up of the Chamber of Deputies and the Senate. Senators were elected for life and the Senate was a permanent institution, whereas the Chamber of Deputies, unless dissolved earlier, was elected every four years. When Brazil became a Republic and a Federal State, the model of a bicameral legislature was retained at the Federal level, but the Parliament was renamed National Congress. The National Congress is made up of the Chamber of Deputies and the Federal Senate. Both Houses have fixed terms and cannot be dissolved earlier. Under Brazil's present constitution, adopted in 1988, senators are elected for an eight-year term, and deputies are elected every four years.

The numbering of the legislatures is continuous, including the legislatures of the imperial General Assembly and of the republican National Congress. The inauguration of a new composition of Chamber of Deputies for a four-year term of office marks the start of a new legislature.

Legislature	Period	Legislature	Period	Legislature	Period	Legislature	Period	Legislature	Period
1st Legislature	1826–1829	13th Legislature	1867–1868	25th Legislature	1900–1902	37th Legislature	1935–1937	49th Legislature	1991–1995
2nd Legislature	1830–1833	14th Legislature	1869–1872	26th Legislature	1903–1905	38th Legislature	1946–1950	50th Legislature	1995–1999
3rd Legislature	1834–1837	15th Legislature	1872–1875	27th Legislature	1906–1908	39th Legislature	1951–1954	51st Legislature	1999–2003
4th Legislature	1838–1841	16th Legislature	1876–1877	28th Legislature	1909–1911	40th Legislature	1955–1958	52nd Legislature	2003–2007
5th Legislature	1842–1844	17th Legislature	1878–1881	29th Legislature	1912–1914	41st Legislature	1959–1962	53rd Legislature	2007–2011
6th Legislature	1845–1847	18th Legislature	1882–1884	30th Legislature	1915–1917	42nd Legislature	1963–1967	54th Legislature	2011–2015
7th Legislature	1848–1848	19th Legislature	1885–1885	31st Legislature	1918–1920	43rd Legislature	1967–1970	55th Legislature	2015–2019
8th Legislature	1849–1852	20th Legislature	1886–1889	32nd Legislature	1921–1923	44th Legislature	1971–1975	56th Legislature	2019–2023
9th Legislature	1853–1856	21st Legislature	1890–1891	33rd Legislature	1924–1926	45th Legislature	1975–1979	57th Legislature	2023–2027
10th Legislature	1857–1860	22nd Legislature	1891–1893	34th Legislature	1927–1929	46th Legislature	1979–1983		
11th Legislature	1861–1863	23rd Legislature	1894–1896	35th Legislature	1930–1930	47th Legislature	1983–1987		
12th Legislature	1864–1866	24th Legislature	1897–1899	36th Legislature	1933–1935	48th Legislature	1987–1991		

== See also ==
- Chamber of Deputies (Brazil)
- Federal Senate (Brazil)
- List of legislatures by country
- Palácio do Planalto
- Politics of Brazil
