= 2027 President of the Chamber of Deputies of Brazil election =

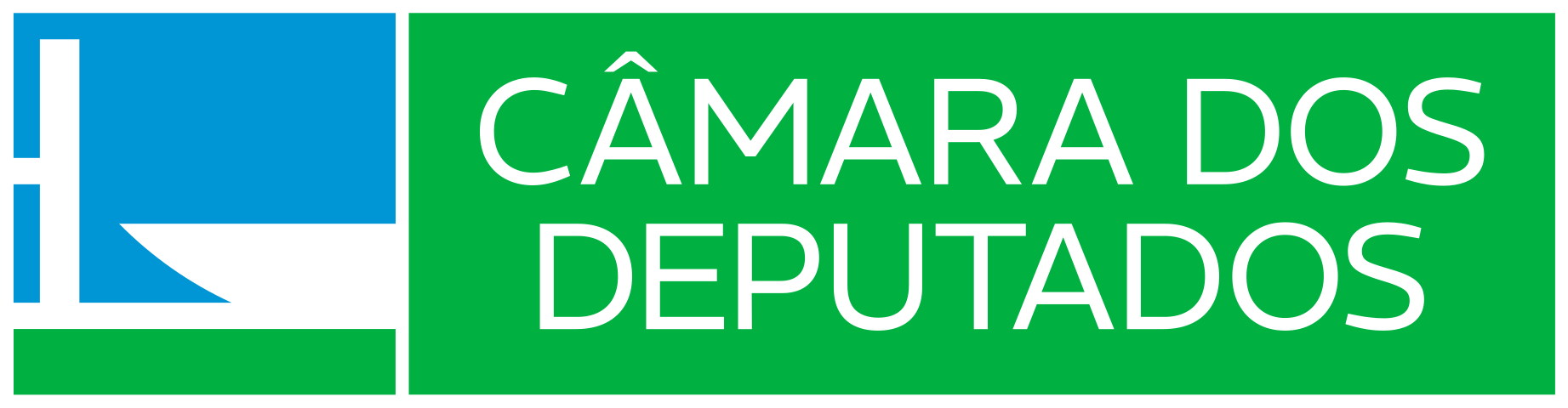
- 1 February 2027

Needed to Win: 513 eligible voting members in the Chamber of Deputies 257 seats needed for a majority
Incumbent President
Hugo Motta
Republicanos

The 2027 President of the Chamber of Deputies of Brazil election will take place on 1 February 2027, the opening day of the 1st Session of the 58th Legislature of the National Congress, almost four months after the 2026 elections. It will result in the election of the President of the Chamber of Deputies, two vice presidents, the positions of 1st, 2nd, 3rd and 4th Secretaries and their respective replacements. They will hold a biennial term (2027–2029), making it impossible to be re-elected during the same Legislature - as established in Art. 5 of the Internal Statute of the Chamber of Deputies.

The incumbent president, Hugo Motta is able to run for a second term. The election will be carried out by secret ballot and electronic voting, requiring an absolute majority of votes, in the first ballot, and a simple majority, in the second ballot, with the absolute majority of the Deputies present. (Article 7 of the Internal Regulations of the Chamber of Deputies)

== Candidates ==
=== Potential candidates ===
- Altineu Côrtes (PL-RJ) - Member of the Chamber from Rio de Janeiro since 2015; Leader of the Liberal Party 2022–2025; member of the Legislative Assembly of Rio de Janeiro 2003–2015.
- Hugo Motta (Republicanos-PB) - Member of the Chamber from Paraíba since 2011; President of the Chamber since 2025.
- Sóstenes Cavalcante (PL-RJ) - Member of the Chamber from Rio de Janeiro since 2015; Leader of the Liberal Party since 2025; Second Vice President of the Chamber 2023–2025.
- Zé Trovão (PL-SC) - Member of the Chamber from Santa Catarina since 2023.

=== Endorsements ===
Hugo Motta (Republicanos-PB)

Executive branch officials

- Luiz Inácio Lula da Silva, President of Brazil (2003–2010, 2023–present)

Political parties

- Workers' Party (PT)
- Brazil Union (UNIÃO)
- Social Democratic Party (PSD)
- Progressistas (PP)
- Republicanos
- Brazilian Democratic Movement (MDB)
- Podemos (PODE)
- Brazilian Socialist Party (PSB)
- Brazilian Social Democracy Party (PSDB)
- Communist Party of Brazil (PCdoB)
- Green Party (PV)
- Democratic Labour Party (PDT)
- Solidariedade
