= Henrique Vieira =

Brazilian politician (born 1987)

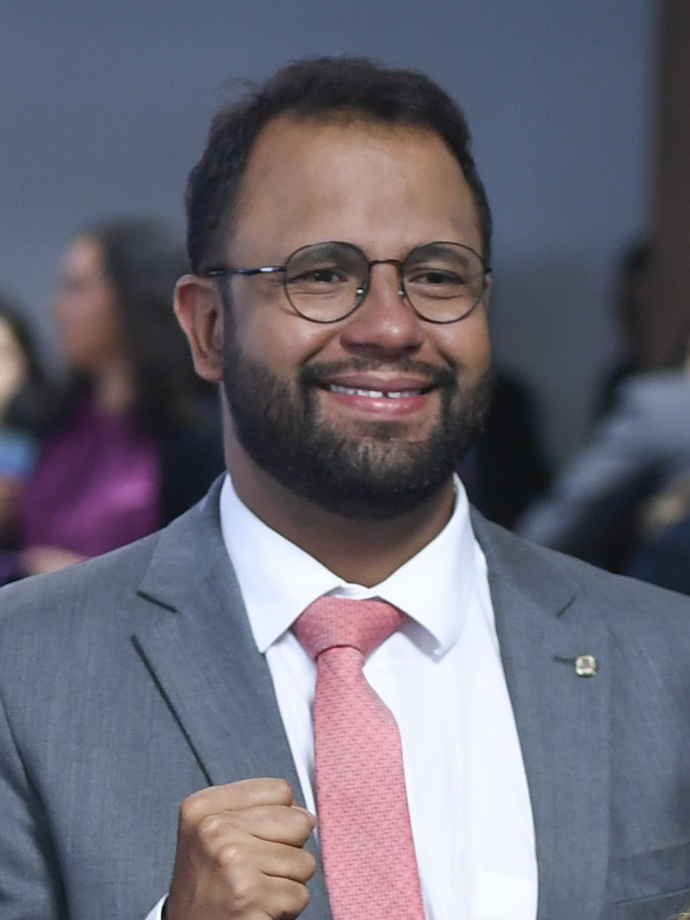
- Vieira in 2023

Member of the Chamber of Deputies
- Incumbent
- Assumed office 1 February 2023
- Constituency: Rio de Janeiro

Personal details
- Born: 15 April 1987 (age 39)
- Party: Socialism and Liberty Party

Henrique dos Santos Vieira Lima (born 15 April 1987) is a Brazilian pastor and politician serving as a member of the Chamber of Deputies since 2023. From 2013 to 2016, he was a municipal councillor of Niterói. In 2019, he appeared in Marighella. He was a candidate for president of the Chamber of Deputies in the 2025 election.

== Biography ==
The son of a teacher and a tailor, Vieira was born and raised in the Fonseca neighborhood of the city of Niterói. He studied for a large part of his life at the Joaquim Távora State College, located in the Icaraí neighborhood, and spent part of his adolescence in the Santa Rosa neighborhood, in the same city.

During adolescence, he suffered from inflammation of the optic nerve and lost a significant portion of his vision for about two years when he was 16 years old. Even after treatment, it was not possible to fully restore his vision, and only his peripheral vision remained. These events made it difficult for the pastor to study for the university entrance exam, but he later graduated in History, Sociology, and Theology.

In 2016, when he ceased being a city councilor for Niterói, he moved from the Santa Rosa neighborhood to Rio de Janeiro.

=== Ministry ===
Vieira was raised in a Baptist evangelical family, leading him to attend the First Baptist Church of Niterói during his adolescence. In 2009, he became a seminarian in a congregation of this same church. About three years later, along with a group of young people, he founded the Igreja Batista do Caminho, an itinerant church operating between the cities of Rio de Janeiro and Niterói. There, Vieira coordinated projects to collect donations from small farmers in the state for vulnerable families in Morro da Providência, in addition to participating in a community college entrance exam project that helps young people from the region gain admission to public universities.

According to Vieira, the figures who motivated him to become a pastor were Martin Luther King Jr., Dom Hélder Câmara, Frei Tito, Frei Betto, Dorothy Stang, Francis of Assisi, and Teresa of Ávila. He stated that he has been the target of attacks from both progressive and religious groups.
