= Fonseca, Niterói =

Fonseca
- Neighborhood
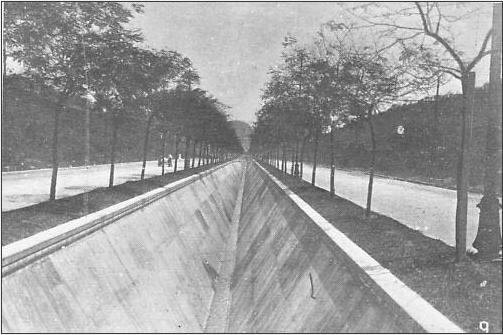
- Alameda São Boaventura in 1909
- Country: Brazil
- State: Rio de Janeiro
- Municipality: Niterói
- Administrative Region: Zona Norte (North Zone)

Population (2010)
  - Total: 52,000
- Time zone: UTC-3 (BRT)

Fonseca is a central neighborhood in the North Zone (Zona Norte) of Niterói, in the state of Rio de Janeiro, Brazil. It is one of the most populous, oldest, and strategically situated neighborhoods in the municipality, serving as the main transport axis connecting downtown Niterói to the Rio–Niterói Bridge, the neighboring municipalities of São Gonçalo and Maricá, and the Região dos Lagos coastal region.

With a heterogeneous and predominantly residential urban character, Fonseca features a broad network of local trade and services, major educational institutions, regional reference hospitals, and important historical, environmental, and cultural landmarks, such as the Niterói Botanical Garden (Horto Botânico de Niterói / Jardim Botânico Nilo Peçanha), the Oliveira Vianna House Museum, and the centennial Fonseca Atlético Clube.

== Etymology ==
The neighborhood's name dates back to the 18th century and originates from the surname of the Portuguese nobleman and landowner José da Fonseca e Vasconcelos. Owner of one of the largest land grants (sesmarias) in the former Vila Real da Praia Grande region, José da Fonseca established a prosperous sugarcane plantation featuring a sugar mill and a chapel dedicated to Saint Bonaventure. Over the decades, as the land was subdivided into smaller farms and properties in the 19th century, the area became known as "Val de Fonseca" and later simply "Fonseca".

== Geography ==
=== Location and borders ===
Fonseca is situated in Niterói's North Zone and belongs to the North Administrative Region of the municipality. It borders several Niterói neighborhoods:

- North: Engenhoca and Tenente Jardim;
- South: São Lourenço, Fátima, and Cubango;
- East: Caramujo and Santa Rosa;
- West: Barreto and Santana.

Its central artery and structural axis is Alameda São Boaventura, a long, tree-lined avenue around which the neighborhood developed longitudinally.

=== Topography, hydrography, and climate ===
Geomorphologically, the neighborhood occupies a valley surrounded by hills covered with tropical vegetation, including Morro do Castro, Morro Seco, Morro da Vila Ipiranga, and Morro do Ceasa.

The main watercourse in the neighborhood is the Vicência River (also referred to in parts as Rio das Pedras or Canal da Alameda), which flows through a canal in the central median of Alameda São Boaventura. The river receives runoff and stormwater from the surrounding slopes and empties into Guanabara Bay. Due to the valley topography and intense soil impermeabilization from urban development, parts of the neighborhood have historically faced flooding during periods of heavy rain, prompting regular dredging and drainage works by municipal authorities.

The climate is tropical (Am/Cwa under the Köppen climate classification), characterized by hot, rainy summers and mild, drier winters. The dense vegetation of the Botanical Garden and residential avenues helps temper local temperatures compared to the more built-up areas of downtown Niterói.

== Demographics and socioeconomic profile ==
According to census data from the Brazilian Institute of Geography and Statistics (IBGE), Fonseca is one of the most populous neighborhoods in Niterói, with over 52,000 residents recorded in 2010.

The demographic and socioeconomic profile of the neighborhood is highly diverse:

- Middle and upper-middle class: Concentrated in flat, leafy sub-districts such as Bairro Chic, the Palmeiras area, Rua Magnólia Brasil, and the surroundings of the Botanical Garden, characterized by residential condominiums, single-family homes, and apartment buildings.
- Lower-middle and working class: Distributed along Alameda São Boaventura, Rua Professor João Brasil, and areas bordering Engenhoca and Cubango.
- Low-income communities and favelas: Located on the peripheral hillsides of the neighborhood, housing a working-class population in established informal settlements such as Vila Ipiranga, Morro Seco, Coréia, and Santo Cristo.

== History ==
=== Colonial and Imperial periods (16th–19th centuries) ===
The land comprising modern Fonseca was originally part of the large land grant awarded in 1568 to Chief Araribóia, founder of Niterói (then São Lourenço dos Índios). Throughout the 17th century, the lands were gradually transferred or sold to religious orders—notably the Jesuits—and private farmers.

In the 18th century, the region consolidated as an agricultural zone supplying produce to the city of Rio de Janeiro and Vila Real da Praia Grande. Large plantations cultivated sugarcane, coffee, corn, cassava, and citrus fruits. José da Fonseca e Vasconcelos's estate stood out for its sugar production and the construction of a chapel dedicated to Saint Bonaventure, a local religious landmark.

In the 19th century, following the transfer of the provincial capital of Rio de Janeiro to Niterói in 1834, Fonseca attracted wealthy families from the imperial court and provincial politics, who built country estates (chácaras) along the main access road into the interior.

=== 20th century: Urbanization and industrial growth ===
In the early 20th century, Fonseca underwent rapid urbanization. The expansion of public transit—initially mule-drawn trams, followed by electric streetcars operated by the Companhia de Cantareira e Viação Fluminense—facilitated the subdivision of former estates into urban lots.

In 1906, the President of the State of Rio de Janeiro, Nilo Peçanha, expropriated land in the neighborhood to create the Niterói Botanical Garden (Horto Botânico de Niterói), intended for experimental agricultural production and seedling propagation. Around the same period, mechanical workshops, textile factories, and technical schools were established, such as the Escola Técnica Estadual Henrique Lage (founded in 1923).

During this era, the neighborhood consolidated its identity as a middle-class residential area and cultural hub. The Fonseca Atlético Clube, founded in 1917, gained state recognition by winning the Campeonato Fluminense professional football championship three times (1959, 1960, and 1962), competing against major national teams in the Taça Brasil.

=== 21st century ===
Between 2008 and 2010, the Rio de Janeiro State Government and Niterói City Hall built a Bus Rapid Service (BRS) corridor along Alameda São Boaventura. The project created dedicated bus lanes and elevated boarding stations to streamline intercity transit.

Recent initiatives in the neighborhood include urban revitalization programs, expansion of public healthcare facilities, public lighting upgrades, and plans to establish dedicated dining and cultural districts.

== Sub-districts and communities ==
=== Residential sectors ===
- Bairro Chic: An upper-middle-class residential area centered around streets like Magnólia Brasil, Desembargador Lima e Castro, and Presidente Backer. It features tree-lined streets, spacious homes, upscale retail, and local dining.
- Palmeiras: A middle-class residential area adjacent to the Botanical Garden, known for quiet streets and green surroundings.
- Teixeira de Freitas and Riodades: Commercial and residential sectors along secondary avenues.

=== Informal settlements ===
- Vila Ipiranga: One of Niterói's largest and oldest informal communities, with an estimated population exceeding 15,000. It originated in the mid-20th century on former agricultural land, housing industrial and construction workers.
- Morro Seco, Coréia, and Santo Cristo: Hillside settlements receiving municipal investments in slope stabilization, sanitation, and paving.
- Other localities: Buraco do Juca, Quebra, Granja do Pau Ferro, Vila Guarani, Caixa d'Água, Pimba, Bonfim, Juca Branco, and Chapa Quente.

== Transportation ==
=== Alameda São Boaventura and BRS Corridor ===
Alameda São Boaventura is the primary thoroughfare of Fonseca and one of the busiest avenues in the Rio de Janeiro metropolitan area. Spanning approximately 3.2 km (2.0 mi), it consists of dual carriageways running on either side of the Vicência River Canal.

Inaugurated in March 2010, the BRS Corridor on Alameda features dedicated bus lanes for municipal and intercity routes and central median stations. The avenue handles over 80,000 vehicles daily and serves bus routes connecting Niterói to São Gonçalo, Itaboraí, Maricá, Rio de Janeiro, and Duque de Caxias.

=== Highway connections ===
Fonseca serves as a key regional junction:

- RJ-104: State highway connecting Niterói to São Gonçalo, Itaboraí, and the BR-116 highway.
- RJ-106 (Rodovia Amaral Peixoto): Highway connecting the neighborhood to the Região dos Lagos coastal towns (Maricá, Saquarema, Araruama, Cabo Frio).
- Rio–Niterói Bridge (BR-101): Access to the bridge is located minutes from the southern tip of the neighborhood, providing direct access to the city of Rio de Janeiro.

== Infrastructure and public services ==
=== Healthcare ===
- Hospital Municipal Getúlio Vargas Filho ("Getulinho"): Founded in 1953 on Rua Teixeira de Freitas, it is Niterói's primary public pediatric emergency and inpatient hospital.
- Policlínica Regional do Fonseca (Dr. Guilherme Taylor March): Located on Rua Desembargador Lima e Castro, providing outpatient care, specialty consultations, diagnostic exams, and medications via the SUS.

=== Education ===
- Escola Técnica Estadual Henrique Lage (ETEHL): Operated by FAETEC, it is a prominent public vocational and secondary school offering technical diplomas in mechanics, electronics, construction, and electrical engineering.
- Private and public schools: Includes historic private institutions like Colégio Nossa Senhora das Mercês, alongside several municipal and state public schools.

== Culture and landmarks ==
=== Niterói Botanical Garden (Jardim Botânico Nilo Peçanha) ===
Established on 16 May 1906, the Niterói Botanical Garden covers approximately 258,000 m^{2} (64 acres) of protected green space in central Fonseca. It contains native Atlantic Forest trees, including centuries-old jatobás, jequitibás, and jacarandas. Today, it functions as a public urban park for leisure, athletics, cultural events, and environmental education.

=== Oliveira Vianna House Museum ===
Located at Alameda São Boaventura, No. 41, the Casa de Oliveira Vianna was the residence of sociologist, jurist, and historian Francisco José de Oliveira Vianna (1883–1951), a member of the Brazilian Academy of Letters. Designated a historic heritage site by INEPAC and IPHAN, the house museum preserves his personal library of rare volumes, original furnishings, and historical documents.

=== Fonseca Atlético Clube ===
Founded on 12 October 1917, Fonseca Atlético Clube is a historic sports club based on Alameda São Boaventura. The club achieved prominence in professional football during the 1950s and 1960s, winning three state titles in the Campeonato Fluminense (1959, 1960, and 1962). Although its professional football department closed in 1965, the club remains active in social and recreational sports such as futsal and swimming.

== See also ==
- Niterói
- Rio–Niterói Bridge
