= Oliveira Viana =

Brazilian professor, jurist and sociologist (1883–1951)

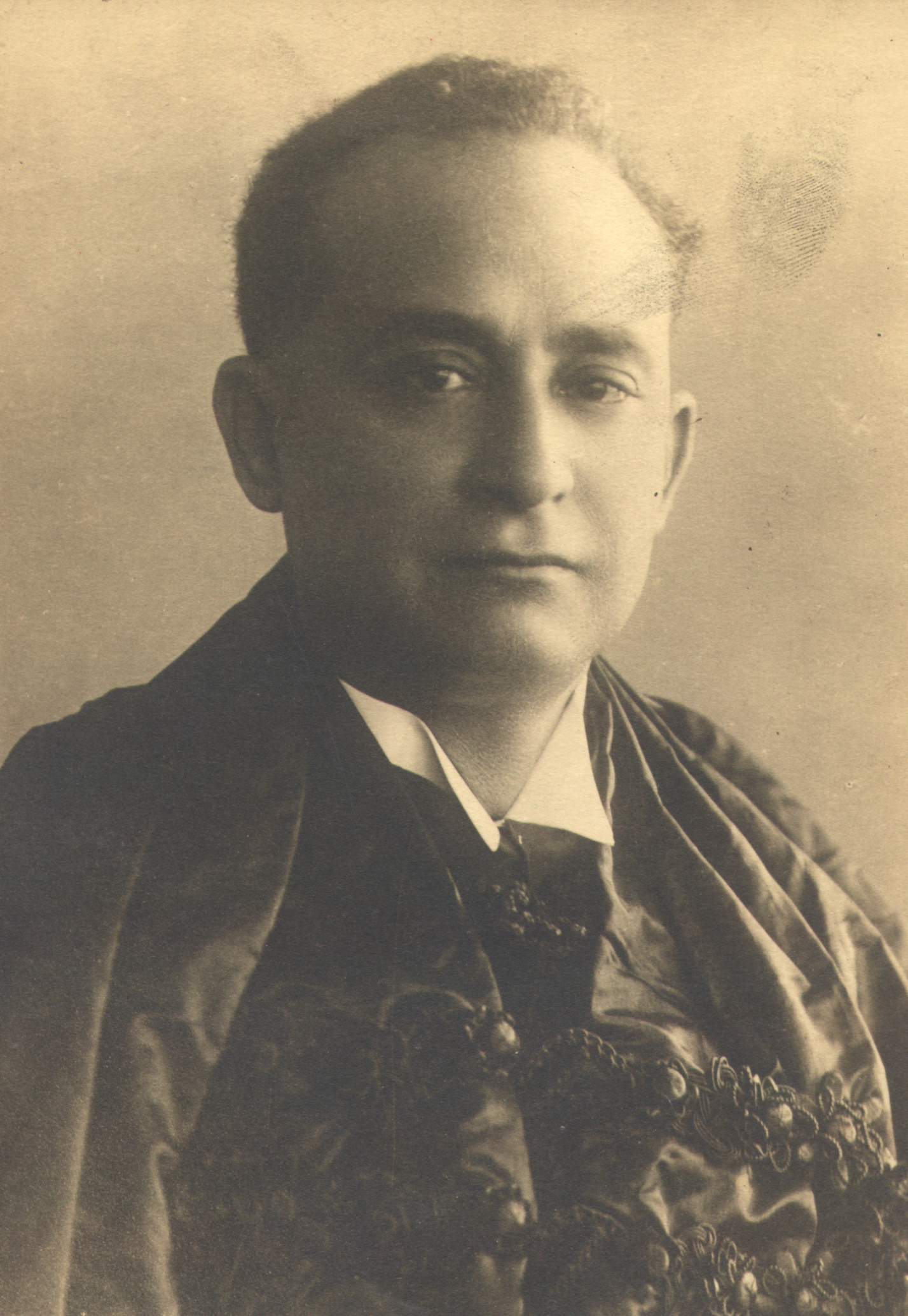
- Born: June 20, 1883; Saquarema, Rio de Janeiro, Brazil
- Died: March 28, 1951 (aged 67); Niterói, Rio de Janeiro, Brazil

Francisco José de Oliveira Viana (June 20, 1883 – March 28, 1951) was a Brazilian professor, jurist, historian, sociologist, and an imortal of the Brazilian Academy of Letters. He has been described as a conservative political theorist.

== Biography ==
Son of Francisco José de Oliveira Viana and Balbina Rosa de Azeredo, he studied at Carlos Alberto school, at Niterói, where he concluded the prep course, enrolling at Faculdade Livre de Direito, at Rio de Janeiro, which nowadays is the National Law College of the Federal University of Rio de Janeiro (UFRJ), where he graduated in 1906.

He soon got a chair in the Fluminense Federal University Law School, in Niterói- then Rio de Janeiro's capital city- as a teacher of Penal Process, in 1916. After being off the teaching body, returns to it in 1930, occupying a new chair in the Law Course, one of which he would be one of the more expressive holders: the Social Law chair (later known as Industrial Law and further as Labor Law). From this time three books are distinguished: Questions of Corporative Law (1938); Questions of Sindical Law (1943), and the collection of disperse studies grouped as Of Labor Law and Social Democracy, edited in 1951. He holds several state and national public offices, until becoming, as of 1940, a minister in the National Audit Tribunal.

His work, versing about the formation of Brazilian people, has the merit of being one of the first which endeavored to address the subject under a sociological and differentiated view. He wrote ''Meriodional Populations of Brazil'' (1918), considered a classic of national thinking.

He was one of the ideologues of racial eugenism in Brazil. He was against the coming of Japanese immigrants to Brazil. He got notoriously known for quotes like ''the 200 million Hindu are not worth the handful of British who dominates them'', and ''the Japanese are like sulphur: insoluble'', and also ''the Party is the President'', referring to Getúlio Vargas.

As a jurist, his specialty was Labor Law, an incipient branch in Brazil, which he helped to consolidate, being one of the organizers of the Brazilian sindical system and its financing. He was a member of the Brazilian Geographic and Historical Institute, beside other Brazilian and Portuguese learned institutions.

== Academia Brasileira de Letras ==
He was elected on May 27, 1937, for the chair number 8 of the Academia, whose founding patron is Cláudio Manuel da Costa, as its second occupant. He was received by Afonso d’Escragnolle Taunay, better known by his romance ''Inocência'' and the historical account ''Retirada de Laguna.''

== See also ==
- Estado Novo
- Corporativism
