= Paulo Alexandre Barbosa =

Brazilian politician (born 1979)

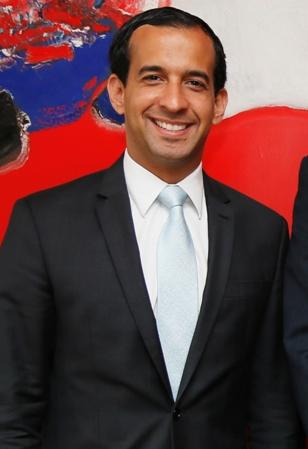
- Barbosa in 2013

Member of the Chamber of Deputies
- Incumbent
- Assumed office 1 February 2023
- Constituency: São Paulo

Personal details
- Born: 9 January 1979 (age 47)
- Party: Brazilian Social Democracy Party (since 2002)

Paulo Alexandre Pereira Barbosa (born 9 January 1979) is a Brazilian politician serving as a member of the Chamber of Deputies since 2023. From 2013 to 2020, he served as mayor of Santos.
