= Sérgio Souza =

Brazilian politician (born 1971)

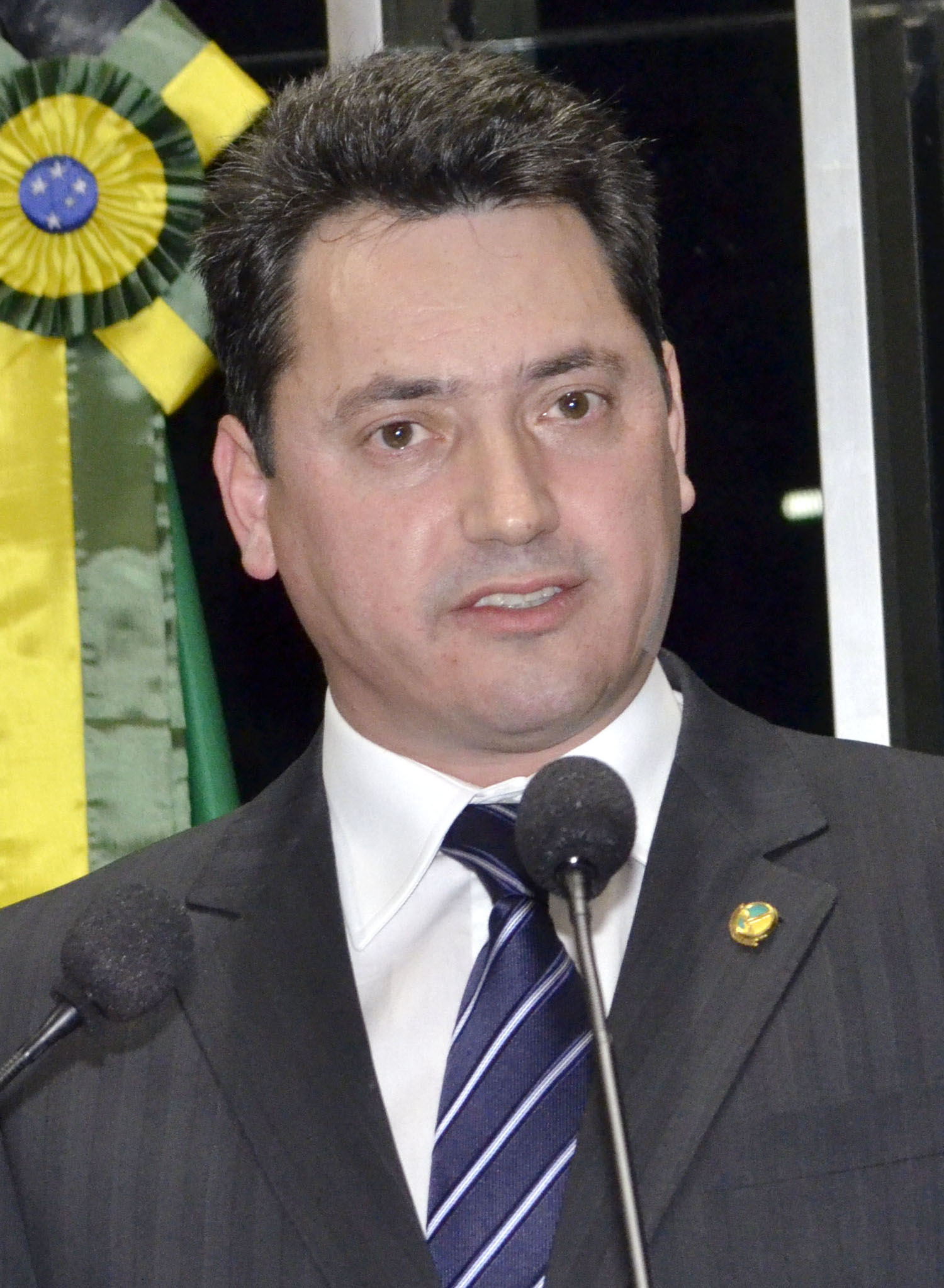
- Souza in 2011

Member of the Chamber of Deputies
- Incumbent
- Assumed office 1 February 2015
- Constituency: Paraná

Member of the Federal Senate
- In office 14 June 2011 – 2 February 2014
- Constituency: Paraná

Personal details
- Born: 13 March 1971 (age 55)
- Party: Brazilian Democratic Movement (since 2010)

Sérgio de Souza (born 13 March 1971) is a Brazilian politician serving as a member of the Chamber of Deputies since 2015. From 2011 to 2014, he was a member of the Federal Senate.
