= Victor Linhalis =

Brazilian politician (born 1986)

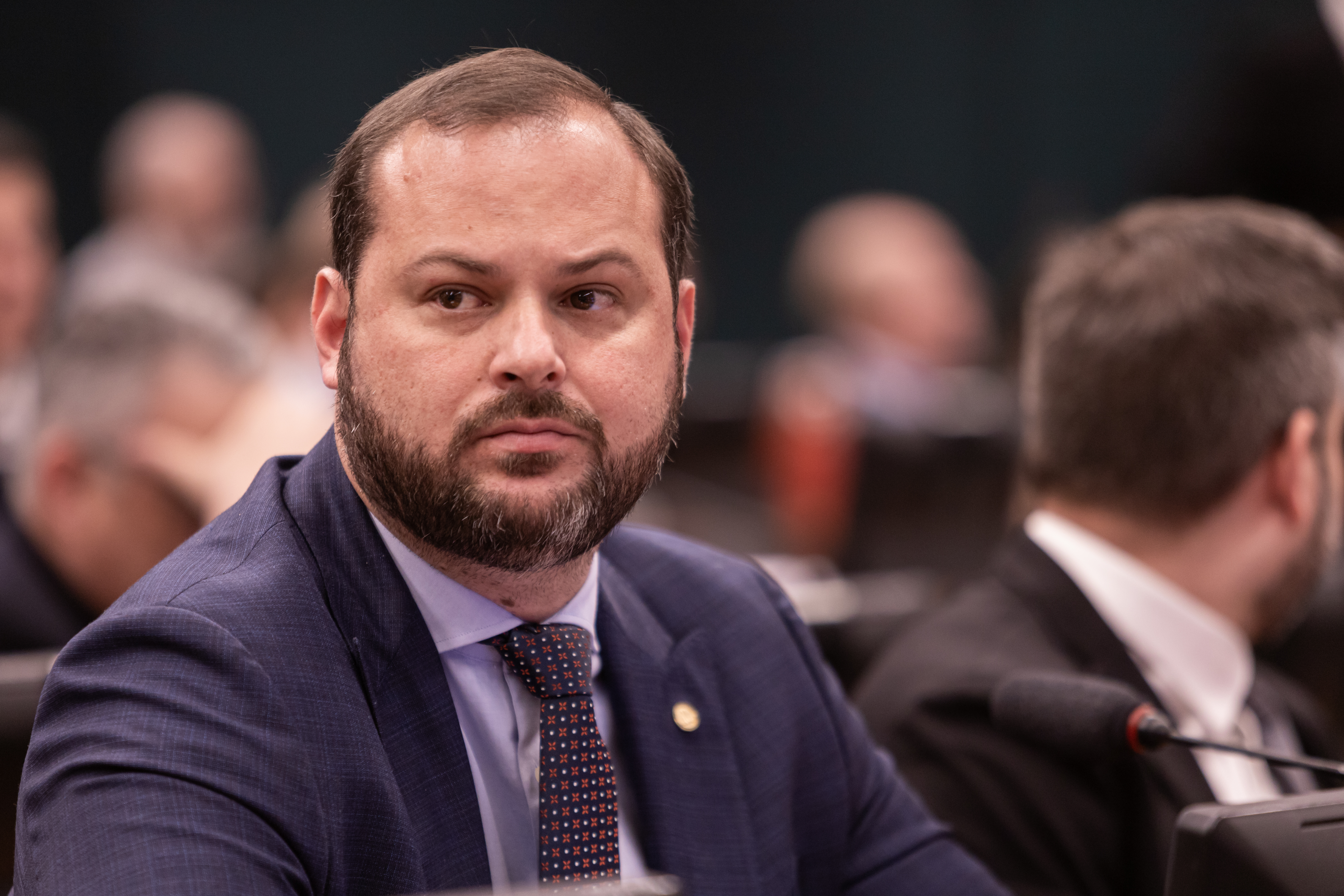
- Linhalis in 2024

Member of the Chamber of Deputies
- Incumbent
- Assumed office 1 February 2023
- Constituency: Espírito Santo

Personal details
- Born: 2 January 1986 (age 40)
- Party: PSDB

Victor Garozi Linhalis (born 2 January 1986) is a Brazilian politician serving as a member of the Chamber of Deputies since 2023. From 2020 to 2022, he served as deputy mayor of Vila Velha.
