= Brazilian presidential line of succession =

Line of succession of the post of president of Brazil

The Brazilian presidential line of succession defines who may become or act as President of the Federative Republic of Brazil upon the death, resignation, incapacity or removal from office of the elected president, and also when the president is out of the country or is suspended due to impeachment proceedings.

The Brazilian Federal Constitution establishes that a vice president succeeds as president when the elected president dies, resigns or is removed from office. The other officers in the line of succession are the president of the Chamber of Deputies, the president of the Federal Senate, and the president of the Supreme Federal Court, in that order, but those other officers do not succeed to the presidency as a vice president would. Instead, they merely serve as acting president.

The vice president and the other officers in the line of succession, in accordance with the constitutional order of preference, also serve as acting president when the president is under incapacity, or is suspended due to impeachment proceedings, or when the president travels abroad.

In Brazil, when the vice president dies, resigns or is removed from office, or when a vice president succeeds to the presidency, the vice presidency remains vacant until the inauguration of the vice president chosen in the next election. That election is usually the presidential election held in the last year of the presidential term to choose the president and vice president that will serve in the next four-year presidential term. Only when both the presidency and the vice presidency become vacant at the same time are special elections summoned to elect a new president and vice president to complete the pending presidential term.

== Death, resignation or removal from office ==
Should a president die in office, resign or be removed from office, a vice-president succeeds as president.

The other officers in the line of succession do not become president in those cases. Instead, the next available person in line merely becomes acting president, and the Constitution dictates that, whenever both the presidency and the vice-presidency become vacant, new elections are to be held. So in the case of an acting president taking office due to a double vacancy in the presidency and vice-presidency, the acting president serves only until the special election takes place and the newly elected president and vice-president are sworn-in.

If the second vacancy triggering elections takes place in the last two years of the presidential term, the National Congress is empowered and required to elect the president (and his vice-president). If the double vacancy of the presidency and vice-presidency takes place in the first half of the four-year presidential term, however, a presidential election by popular vote is held.

In any event, the president and vice-president so elected merely finish what remains of the pending presidential term, and thereafter a new president and a new vice-president, chosen in the regular general elections, take office for a normal four-year term.

== Acting president during presidential travel abroad: the special case of two centers of authority ==
In Brazil, per constitutional custom dating back to the 19th century, whenever a president travels abroad, although the president remains invested with the powers and duties of the office for the purpose of representing the country abroad, the dispatch of the business of the presidency and the discharge of the powers and duties of the office are also vested in the vice-president as acting president or, if the vice-president is also not available, in the next person in the line of succession who is able to serve.

The situation is similar in a way to the appointment of Counsellors of State by the British Sovereign. Just like the British Sovereign remains invested with the royal powers while the Counsellors of State are in place to handle the royal functions, so that there are two centers of authority capable of discharging those functions (the Sovereign himself or the Counsellors), when the president of Brazil travels abroad this automatically triggers the assumption of the office of acting president by the person next in line who is in Brazil, but in that specific case, dictated by constitutional custom and not by the express text of the Constitution, two subjective centers of authority remain in place: the president who is abroad and the acting president.

== Service by an acting president in the event of presidential incapacity or during the trial of charges of impeachment accepted against the president ==
The vice-president, or, should the vice-presidency be vacant or the vice-president unavailable, the next person in the line of succession, takes office as acting president whenever the president is under an incapacity that impedes him from discharging the powers and duties of the presidency.

The vice-president, or the next available person in the line of succession, also assumes the powers of the presidency as acting president if, authorized by the Chamber of Deputies, the Senate votes to start a trial on charges of impeachment presented against the president. The admission of the charges requires the positive vote of two thirds of the members of the Chamber of Deputies. Once accepted, the charges are sent to the Senate for the trial of impeachment. The Senate, if it accepts to proceed with the trial (a decision that requires the positive vote of a simple majority of the Senators present), must then notify the president that he is now the accused in a trial of impeachment. From the receipt of that notice, the president is suspended from office for a period of 180 days. The suspension cannot be renewed, and ends when the president is acquitted, or automatically at the end of the 180 days, even if the trial of impeachment is not yet finished. During the president's suspension motivated by the acceptance of impeachment charges, the acting president discharges the duties of the presidency.

The situations of presidential incapacity (e.g. for medical reasons), and of presidential suspension due to the acceptance of impeachment charges, differ from the case of presidential travel abroad because, while the absence of the president from the country triggers the assumption of the powers of the office by an acting president, in that specific case, powers are not transferred from the president to the acting president, and instead two centers of authority remain in place personifying the presidency. In the cases of presidential incapacity or of suspension due to impeachment, however, the president is relieved of the powers of the office, and the duties of the presidency are therefore totally transferred to the acting president for the duration of his service.

=== Declaration of presidential incapacity ===
While the current Brazilian Constitution prescribes the procedure for impeachment and trial of the president, and speaks of the vice-president or others discharging the powers of the president in the case of an incapacity, no specific procedure is set out detailing how an incapacity of the president on medical grounds could be declared.

Constitutional custom and praxis in the federal and State levels dictate that, in cases when the head of the Executive Branch is unable to discharge the office for health reasons, temporary incapacity can be self declared by means of an executive message addressed to the Legislature; in such cases, the chief executive can reassume his powers by means of a further message to the Legislative Branch in which he declares that the temporary impediment has ceased and that he is thus resuming the duties of his office.

However, there is no clear procedure for a declaration of incapacity other than the self declared incapacity; thus if the president were to fall under a severe illness, and refused or were unable to sign a message to Congress spontaneously declaring his incapacity, there is no straightforward constitutional provision specifying the procedure required for the presidential impediment to be recognized. It is speculated that, if an incapacity were to exist, and if no spontaneous self declaration took place, it would fall to Congress to recognize such incapacity, but no procedure or quorum is clearly established.

== Current order of presidential substitutes ==
As stated above, the only constitutional successor of a president is his vice president. Only a vice president becomes president in the event of death, removal or resignation of the elected president.

However, the vice president, in addition to being the president's only potential successor, is also his first substitute, serving as acting president when the president is abroad, or when the president is suspended pending an impeachment process, or when the president is otherwise incapacitated (e.g., for medical reasons).

The line of presidential substitutes comprises, in addition to the vice president, the president of the Chamber of Deputies, the president of the Federal Senate, and the president of the Supreme Federal Court, in that order. Those officers are called, in that order, to discharge the powers and duties of the presidency, as acting president, when both the president and vice president are not within the country and available to discharge the powers and duties of the presidency. Those officers also serve as acting president when both the presidency and the vice presidency become vacant, pending new elections to choose a new president and vice president to complete the pending presidential term. Thus, in case of vacancy, only a vice president can serve the entire remainder of the president's term, while other officers only serve as temporary placeholders pending elections.

On 7 December 2016 the Supreme Court of Brazil ruled that defendants in criminal cases cannot serve in the order of presidential substitutes after the charges are accepted for trial. At the time, Senator Renan Calheiros was serving as president of the Federal Senate and was a defendant in a criminal case before the Supreme Court, which meant he could not become acting president of the Republic and was thus excluded from the order of presidential substitutes. Calheiros was succeeded by Eunício Oliveira in February 2017.

The following is the current line of presidential substitutes, according to the Constitution:

No.	Office	Incumbent	Party
1	Vice President of Brazil	Geraldo Alckmin	PSB
2	President of the Chamber of Deputies	Hugo Motta	REP
3	President of the Federal Senate	Davi Alcolumbre	UNIÃO
4	President of the Supreme Federal Court	Edson Fachin	Ind.

== Historical data ==
=== Presidential succession by vice presidents ===
Successor	Party	President	Reason	Date of succession
Floriano Peixoto	Ind.	Deodoro da Fonseca	Resignation	23 November 1891, 2 years and 8 days into his presidency.
Nilo Peçanha	PRF	Afonso Pena	Death	14 June 1909, 2 years, 6 months and 30 days into his presidency.
Delfim Moreira	PRM	Rodrigues Alves	Death	16 January 1919, 2 months and 1 day into his presidency.
Café Filho	PSP	Getúlio Vargas	Death	24 August 1954, 3 years, 6 months and 24 days into his presidency.
João Goulart	PTB	Jânio Quadros	Resignation	8 September 1961, 7 months into his presidency.
Pedro Aleixo	ARENA	Artur da Costa e Silva	Illness	31 August 1969, 2 years, 5 months and 16 days into his presidency. (Note: Vice President Aleixo was prevented from taking office as President after Costa e Silva's death by the 1969 Military Junta. However, he must be shown as former President by the force of Law no. 12,486/2011.)
José Sarney	PMDB	Tancredo Neves	Death	21 April 1985, 37 days into his presidency.
Itamar Franco	PMDB	Fernando Collor	Resignation (Note: President Fernando Collor de Mello was impeached by the Chamber of Deputies, but resigned before being convicted in the Senate, resulting in Itamar Franco becoming President while the trial of Collor continued (eventually resulting in a conviction and his disqualification from public office for eight years).)	29 December 1992, 2 years, 9 months and 14 days into his presidency.
Michel Temer	PMDB	Dilma Rousseff	Impeachment	31 August 2016, 5 years, 7 months and 30 days into her presidency.

=== Presidential succession beyond the vice president ===
Dates	Official (party)	Reason	President (party)
29 October 1945 – 31 January 1946	José Linhares (I); President of the Supreme Federal Court	Forced resignation of Getúlio Vargas. As the National Congress was closed during the Estado Novo, there was no Vice President nor President of the Chamber of Deputies.	Vargas (I)
8 November – 11 November 1955	Carlos Luz (PSD); President of the Chamber of Deputies	Medical leave of absence of President Café Filho. Acting president.	Filho (PSP)
11 November 1955 – 31 January 1956	Nereu Ramos (PSD); First vice president of the Federal Senate	Removal of acting president Carlos Luz. Initially an acting president for Café Filho, who was removed by Congress on 22 November 1955.	Filho (PSP)
25 August – 7 September 1961	Ranieri Mazzilli (PSD); President of the Chamber of Deputies	Resignation of Jânio Quadros while Vice President João Goulart was outside Brazilian territory.	Quadros (PTN)
2 April – 15 April 1964	Ranieri Mazzilli (PSD); President of the Chamber of Deputies	Deposition of João Goulart by the military coup d'état.	Goulart (PTB)
