= Elmar Nascimento =

Brazilian politician (born 1970)

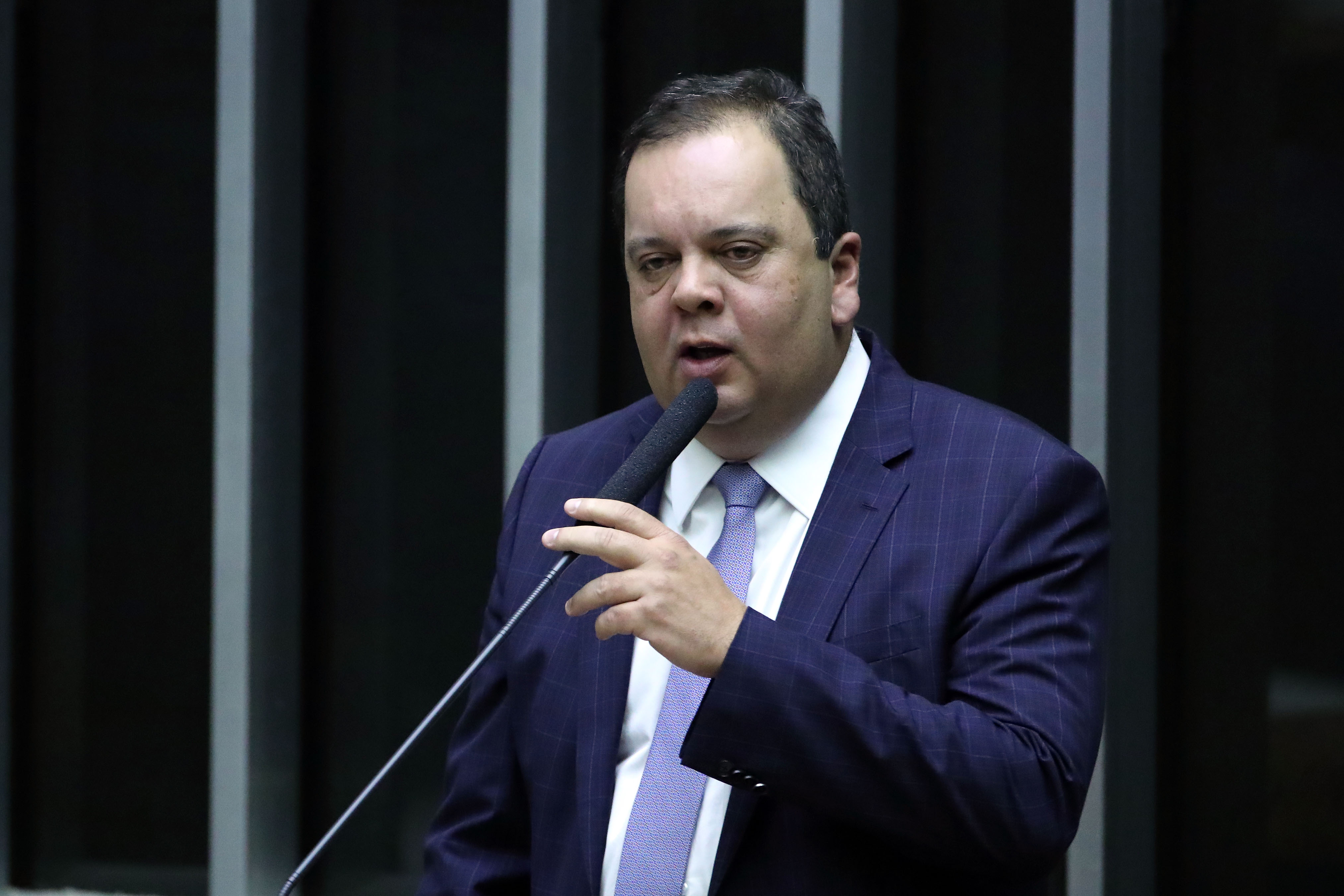
- Nascimento in 2023

Member of the Chamber of Deputies
- Incumbent
- Assumed office 1 February 2015
- Constituency: Bahia

Member of the Legislative Assembly of Bahia
- In office 1 February 2003 – 1 February 2015
- Constituency: At-large

Member of the Municipal Chamber of Campo Formoso
- In office 1 January 1997 – 1 February 2003
- Constituency: At-large

Personal details
- Born: Elmar José Vieira Nascimento; 6 July 1970 (age 56) Campo Formoso, Bahia, Brazil
- Party: UNIÃO (since 2022)
- Other political affiliations: PMDB (1996–2003); PL (2003–2006); PR (2006–2013); DEM (2013–2022)
- Profession: Lawyer

Elmar José Vieira Nascimento (born 6 July 1970) is a Brazilian politician serving as a member of the Chamber of Deputies since 2015. From 2003 to 2014, he was a member of the Legislative Assembly of Bahia.
