= Hugo Motta =

Brazilian politician

His Excellency Hugo Motta

President of the Chamber of Deputies
- Incumbent
- Assumed office 1 February 2025
- Preceded by: Arthur Lira

Member of the Chamber of Deputies
- Incumbent
- Assumed office 1 February 2011
- Constituency: Paraíba

Personal details
- Born: Hugo Motta Wanderley da Nóbrega; 11 September 1989 (age 37) João Pessoa, Paraíba, Brazil
- Party: Republicanos (2019–present)
- Other political affiliations: PMDB (2005–2018); PRB (2018–2019)
- Education: Faculdade Nova Esperança; Catholic University of Brasília
- Occupation: Politician
- Profession: Physician

Hugo Motta Wanderley da Nóbrega (born 11 September 1989) is a Brazilian physician and politician, affiliated with the Republicans. He is a federal deputy for the state of Paraíba, and is the current President of the Chamber of Deputies.

== Biography ==
=== Early years and education ===
Son of a traditional family with ties to Paraíba politics, Hugo was born in João Pessoa, the state capital.

His paternal grandfather, Nabor Wanderley da Nóbrega, was mayor of the municipality of Patos, in the interior of Paraíba, between 1956 and 1959. His maternal grandfather, Edivaldo Motta, was a state deputy of Paraíba five times and served two terms as a federal deputy. His maternal grandmother, Francisca Motta, was a state deputy of Paraíba for six terms, as well as being elected mayor of Patos in the 2012 election.

His father, Nabor Wanderley, was mayor of Patos for two consecutive terms, holding the position from 2005 to 2012. He was elected to the state legislature in 2014. He returned to the position of mayor of Patos after being elected for a new term in 2020, being re-elected in 2024.

He began his studies in medicine at the Nova Esperança Faculty of Medicine in João Pessoa in 2007. When he moved to Brasília in 2011, he transferred the course to the Catholic University of Brasília (UCB), where he graduated in 2013.

=== Politics ===
He was the youngest deputy in the country's history when he was elected at the age of 21 in the 2010 elections with 86,150 votes.

In 2014, he was re-elected federal deputy for Paraíba. Close to Eduardo Cunha, he was part of the 'Cunha shock troops', which included the deputies closest to the then president of the Chamber of Deputies. He voted in favor of the admissibility of Dilma Rousseff's impeachment process.

In 2015, Motta was chosen president of the parliamentary inquiry committee of Petrobras. During Michel Temer's presidency, he voted in favor of the Constitutional Amendment of the Public Expenditure Cap. In April 2017, he was in favor of the Labor Reform. In August 2017, he voted against the process in which an investigation of President Michel Temer was requested, helping to dismiss the complaint by the Federal Public Prosecutor 's Office (MPF).

In 2018, he left the Brazilian Democratic Movement (MDB), after thirteen years in the party, to join the Brazilian Republican Party (PRB). In the new party, he was elected to office for the third time. In 2022, he was re-elected for a fourth term, achieving the highest vote in the state.

He was chosen by Arthur Lira to be the candidate to succeed him as 2025 President of the Chamber of Deputies of Brazil election. On February 1, 2025, he was elected president of the Chamber of Deputies after receiving 444 votes out of 513. At the age of 35, he was the youngest deputy to be elected president in the history of the Chamber. After clashes with Lula's administration, during his 2026 election campaign for a new term in the Chamber of Deputies, he campaigned for Lula. In the election, he received more than 120,000 votes, securing his fifth term.

=== Electoral performance ===
Year	Election	Party	Office	Coalition	Votes	Percent	Result
2010	State Elections of Paraíba	MDB	Federal Deputy	United Paraíba (PP, PTB, PMDB, PSC, PMN)	86,150	4.88%	Elected
2014	State Elections of Paraíba	MDB	Federal Deputy	Real Renewal (PMDB)	123,686	6.39%	Elected
2018	State Elections of Paraíba	Republicanos	Federal Deputy	The Strength of Work I (PSB, PTB, PRB, PT, DEM, PDT, PCdoB, PODE)	92,468	4.65%	Elected
2022	State Elections of Paraíba	Republicanos	Federal Deputy	—N/a	158,171	7.13%	Elected
2026	State Elections of Paraíba	Republicanos	Federal Deputy		124,339	5.17%	Elected

== Personal life ==
He is married to Luana Medeiros Motta, with whom he has two children. He's Catholic.

Political offices
Preceded by Arthur Lira	President of the Chamber of Deputies; 2025–present	Incumbent
Lines of succession
Preceded by Geraldo Alckmin as Vice President of Brazil	Brazilian presidential line of succession 2nd in line as President of the Chamber of Deputies	Followed by Davi Alcolumbre as President of the Federal Senate
Order of precedence
Preceded by Davi Alcolumbre; President of the Federal Senate	Brazilian order of precedence 6th in line as President of the Chamber of Deputies	Followed by Edson Fachin as President of the Supreme Federal Court
