= Delegada Katarina =

Brazilian politician (born 1973)

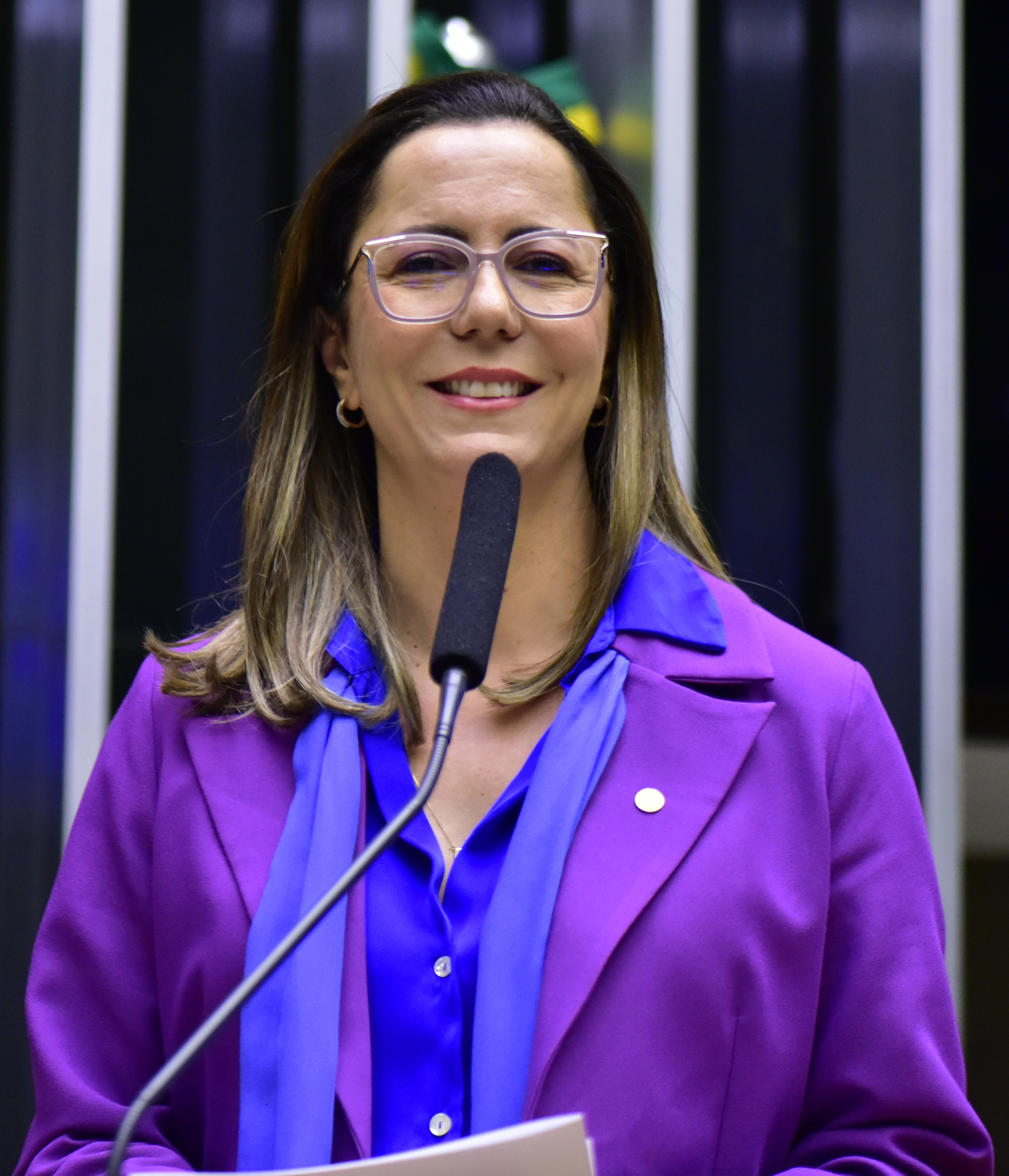
- Katarina in 2023

Member of the Chamber of Deputies
- Incumbent
- Assumed office 1 February 2023
- Constituency: Sergipe

Vice Mayor of Aracaju
- In office 1 January 2021 – 24 January 2023
- Mayor: Edvaldo Nogueira
- Preceded by: Eliane Aquino
- Succeeded by: Ricardo Marques

Personal details
- Born: Katarina Feitoza Lima Santana; 5 October 1973 (age 53) Aracaju, Sergipe, Brazil
- Party: PSD (since 2020)
- Profession: Lawyer, police officer

Katarina Feitoza Lima Santana (born 5 October 1973), better known as Delegada Katarina, is a Brazilian politician serving as a member of the Chamber of Deputies since 2023. She has served as third secretary of the chamber since 2025.

Political offices
Preceded by Eliane Aquino	Vice Mayor of Aracaju; 2021–2023	Vacant Title next held by Ricardo Marques
