= Carlos Veras =

Brazilian politician (born 1981)

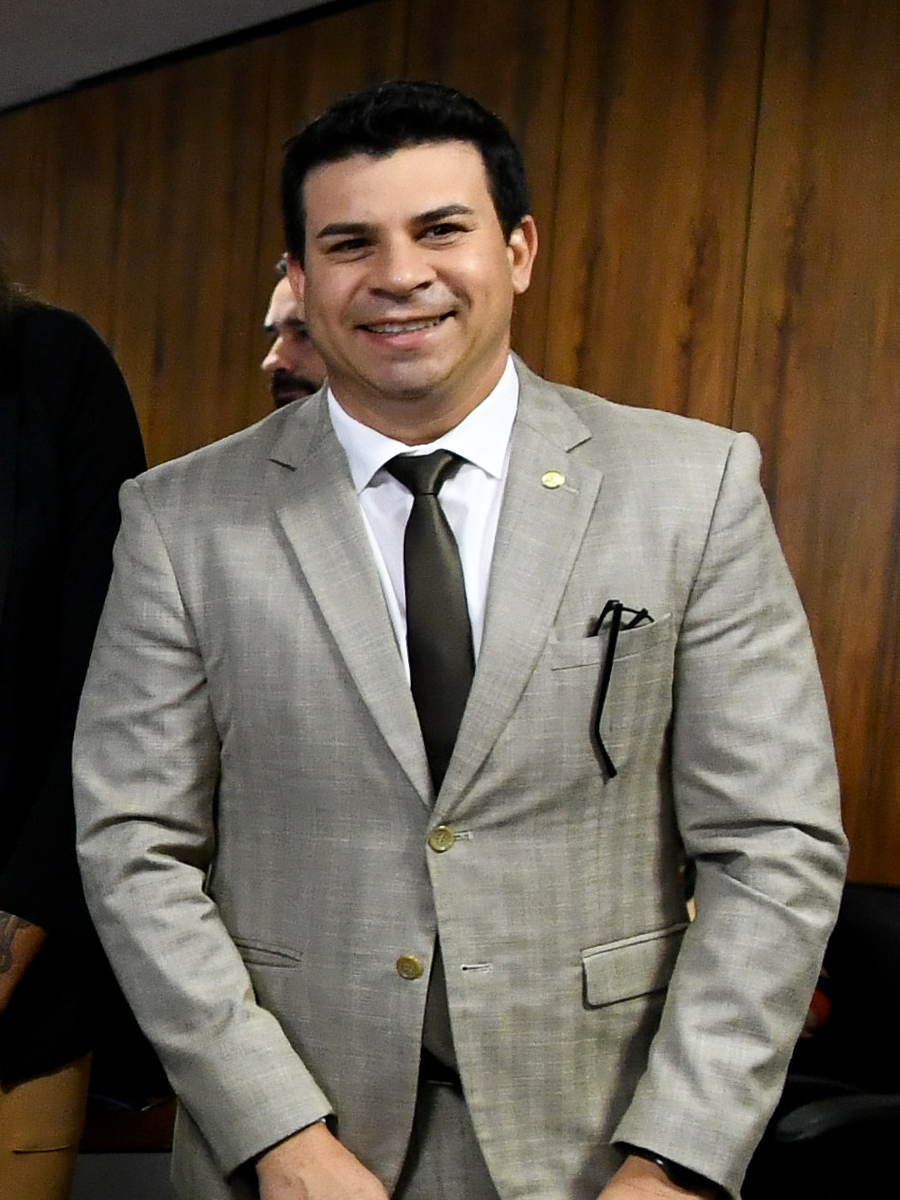
- Veras in 2023

Member of the Chamber of Deputies
- Incumbent
- Assumed office 1 February 2019
- Constituency: Pernambuco

Personal details
- Born: 10 August 1981 (age 44)
- Party: Workers' Party (since 1997)

José Carlos Veras dos Santos (born 10 August 1981) is a Brazilian politician serving as a member of the Chamber of Deputies since 2019. He has served as first secretary of the Chamber since 2025.
