= Altineu Côrtes =

Brazilian politician (born 1968)

- Côrtes in 2022

Member of the Chamber of Deputies
- Incumbent
- Assumed office 1 February 2015
- Constituency: Rio de Janeiro

First Vice President of the Chamber of Deputies
- Incumbent
- Assumed office 1 February 2025
- Preceded by: Marcos Pereira

Member of the Legislative Assembly of Rio de Janeiro
- In office 1 January 2003 – 1 January 2015
- Constituency: At-large

Personal details
- Born: Altineu Côrtes Freitas Coutinho; 13 September 1968 (age 58) Niterói, Rio de Janeiro, Brazil
- Party: PL (2010–2016, 2018–present)
- Other political affiliations: PMDB (2002–2008); PT (2008–2010); MDB (2016–2018)
- Occupation: Politician and entrepreneur
- Website: altineucortes.com.br

Altineu Côrtes Freitas Coutinho (born 13 September 1968), better known as simply Altineu Côrtes, is a Brazilian politician and businessman. He has represented Rio de Janeiro in the Brazilian Chamber of Deputies since 2015. Before that, he was a member of the state legislature of Rio de Janeiro.

== Personal life ==
Côrtes was born to Altineu Pires Coutinho and Angela Maria Freitas. He is a member of the Assembleias de Deus church.

== Political career ==
Côrtes voted in favor of the impeachment motion of then-president Dilma Rousseff. Côrtes would vote against a corruption investigation into Rousseff's successor Michel Temer, and he voted in favor of the 2017 Brazilian labor reforms.
