= 2026 Federal District gubernatorial election =

- Gubernatorial election
- 4 October 2026 (first round); 25 October 2026 (second round)
- Registered: 2,243,988
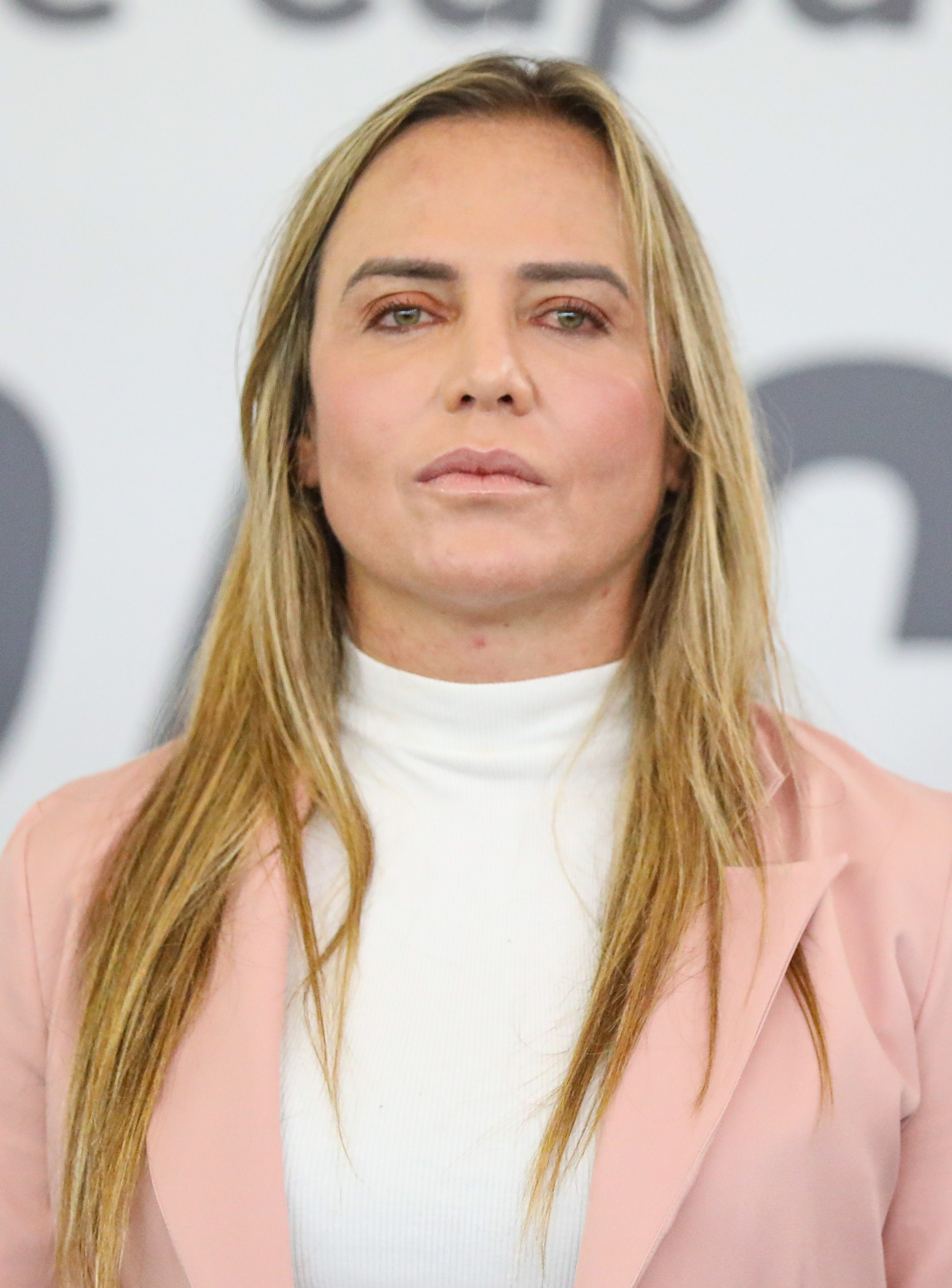

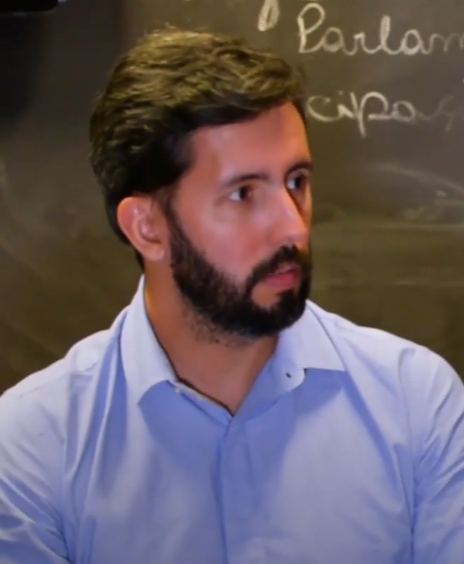
Candidate	Celina Leão	Leandro Grass
Party	PP	PT
Alliance	Propósito e Ação	DF do Povo
Running mate	Gustavo Rocha (Republicanos)	Dora Gomes (PV)
Popular vote	987,142	739,130
Percentage	57.18%	42.82%
Governor before election
Celina Leão
PP
Elected Governor
TBD
- Senatorial election
- 4 October 2026 (one-only round)
- Opinion polls
- Registered: 2,243,988
- Turnout: 81.01% (▼0.26 pp)

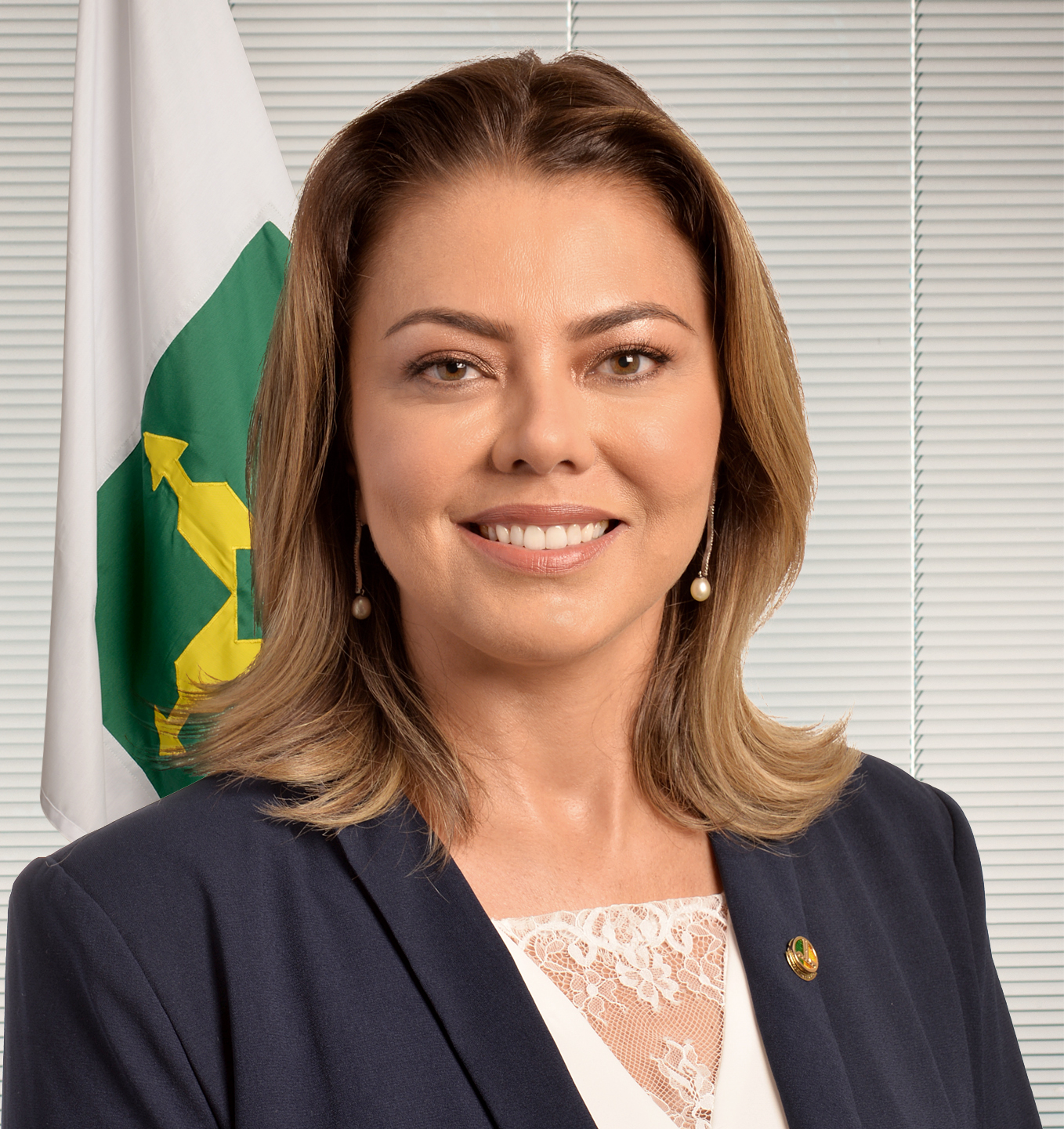
Candidate	Michelle Bolsonaro	Bia Kicis	Leila Barros
Party	PL	PL	PDT
Alliance	Propósito e Ação	Propósito e Ação	DF do Povo
Popular vote	938,496	886,616	686.340
Percentage	29.05%	27.44%	21.25%
Senators before election
Izalci Lucas and Leila Barros
PL and PDT
Elected Senators
Bia Kicis and Michelle Bolsonaro
PL
- Chamber of Deputies election
- 4 October 2026 (one-only round)
- Legislative Chamber election
- 4 October 2026 (one-only round)
- All 24 seats of the Legislative Chamber
Party	Leader	Vote %	Seats	+/–
Legislative Chamber
PL		20.83	5	+1
PT		12.50	3	0
Republicanos		12.50	3	+2
MDB		12.50	3	0
PP		12.50	3	−5
PSOL		8.33	2	0
PSB		8.33	2	+1
UNIÃO	Eduardo Pedrosa	4.17	1	0
PODE	Robério Negreiros	4.17	1	+1
PSD	Rogerio Morro da Cruz	4.17	1	−1
This lists parties that won seats. See the complete results below.

The 2026 Federal District general election were held on 4 October 2026 in the Federal District of Brazil. Voters elected a governor and vice governor, two senators, eight representatives for the Chamber of Deputies, and 24 members of the Legislative Chamber of the Federal District. Because no gubernatorial candidate received a majority of the valid votes in the first round, a runoff election was held on 25 October.

== Background ==
=== Electoral calendar ===
Note: This section only presents the main dates of the 2026 electoral calendar. For detailed information, see official guidance from the Brazilian electoral courts and the Tribunal Superior Eleitoral (TSE).

Electoral calendar
15 May	Start of crowdfunding of candidates
20 July to 5 August	Party conventions for choosing candidates and coalitions
16 August	Start of electoral campaigning and street/digital advertising
4 October	First round of 2026 elections
25 October	Possible second round of 2026 elections
until 19 December	Delivery of electoral diplomas for those elected in the 2026 elections by the Brazilian Election Justice

=== Governor ===
Former governor Ibaneis Rocha of the Brazilian Democratic Movement (MDB) was re-elected in 2022 in the first round with 50.27% of the valid vote, defeating Leandro Grass (26.27%) and other candidates. He is ineligible for immediate re-election after serving two consecutive terms and resigned to run for the Senate, which he later withdrawn, and Vice Governor Celina Leão launched her campaign for a full term as governor.

=== Senator ===
Senators in Brazil serve eight-year terms, and in 2026 each electorate will choose two senators. In the Federal District, the seats currently held by Izalci Lucas (PL) and Leila Barros (PDT), both serving 2019–2027, are scheduled to be contested in 2026.

== Opinion polls ==
=== Governor ===
In early 2026 polling, vice governor Celina Leão and former governor José Roberto Arruda were among the names tested in first-round scenarios, alongside opposition figures such as Leandro Grass.

=== Senatorial ===
Polling has also tested potential 2026 Senate slates in the Federal District, including scenarios featuring governor Ibaneis Rocha as a prospective candidate.

== Gubernatorial candidates ==
No.	Governor			Vice Governor			Coalition Parties	Ref.
No.	Candidate	Party Federation	Relevant offices	Candidate	Party Federation	Relevant offices	Coalition Parties	Ref.
11	Celina Leão; Celina Leão Hizim Ferreira	PP; UPB	District Deputy of the Federal District (2011–2019); Federal Deputy for the Federal District (2019–2023); District Secretary of Sports and Leisure of the Federal District (2020–2021); Vice Governor of the Federal District (2023–2026); Acting Governor of the Federal District (2023); Governor of the Federal District (2026);	Gustavo Rocha; Gustavo do Vale Rocha	Republicanos	Minister of Human Rights of Brazil (2018); District Secretary of Justice and Citizenship of the Federal District (2019–2020); Chief of Staff of the Federal District (2020–2026).	Propósito e Ação (UPB (UNIÃO and PP), Solidary Renewal Fed. (PRD and Solidariedade), Republicanos, MDB, Democrata, DC, PODE, MOBILIZA)	
13	Leandro Grass; Leandro Antonio Grass Peixoto	PT; FE Brasil	District Deputy of the Federal District (2019–2023); President of the National Institute of Historic and Artistic Heritage of Brazil (2023–2026).	Dora Gomes; Maria das Dores Gomes da Silva Santos	PV; FE Brasil	No previous office	DF do Povo (FE Brasil (PT, PCdoB and PV), PSOL REDE Fed. (PSOL and REDE) and PDT)	
16	Professor Robson; Robson Raymundo da Silva	PSTU	No previous office	Guillen; Antônio Guillen	PSTU	No previous office	No coalition	
28	Rico Pinheiro; Alderico da Silva Pinheiro Filho	PRTB	No previous office	Cristiane Barros; Cristiane Barros da Silva Santos	PRTB	No previous office	No coalition	
29	Expedito Mendonça; Expedito Carneiro de Mendonça	PCO	No previous office	Valmir Barbosa; Valmir Barbosa da Silva	PCO	No previous office	No coalition	
30	Kiko Caputo; Francisco Queiroz Caputo Neto	NOVO	No previous office	Delegado Rafael Sampaio; Rafael de Sá Sampaio	NOVO	No previous office	No coalition	
36	Elisson; Elisson Ferreira Freire	Agir	No previous office	Subtenente Sérgio Padro; Sérgio Padro Tomaz	Agir	No previous office	No coalition	
40	Ricardo Cappelli; Ricardo Garcia Cappelli	PSB	State Secretary of Social Communication of Maranhão (2021–2022); Federal Interventor of the Federal District (2023); Acting Secretary of Institutional Security of Brazil (2023); Executive-Secretary of the Ministry of Justice and Public Security of Brazil (2023–2024); President of the Brazilian Agency of Industrial Development (2024–2026).	Sofia Carvalho; Sofia Martins Carvalho	PSB	No previous office	No coalition	
45	Paula Belmonte; Paula Moreno Paro Belmonte	PSDB; PSDB Cidadania Fed.	Federal Deputy for the Federal District (2019–2023); District Deputy of the Federal District (2023–2026).	Juiz Everardo Ribeiro; Everardo Alves Ribeiro	PSDB; PSDB Cidadania Fed.	Vice Mayor of Padre Bernardo (2013–2017; 2025–2026).	PSDB Cidadania Fed. (PSDB and Cidadania)	
55	Arruda; José Roberto Arruda	PSD	Senator for the Federal District (1995–2001); Federal Deputy for the Federal District (2003–2007); Governor of the Federal District (2007–2010).	Luis Pitiman; Luiz Carlos Pietschmann	PSD	No previous office	Resgatar Brasília (PSD and Avante)	
80	Professora Samara Mineiro; Samara Mineiro Oliveira	UP	No previous office	Thaís Oliveira; Thaís Oliveira silva	UP	No previous office	No coalition	

== Senatorial candidates ==
No.	Senator			Substitute members	Coalition Parties
No.	Candidate	Party Federation	Relevant offices	Substitute members	Coalition Parties
123	Leila do Vôlei; Leila Gomes de Barros Rêgo	PDT	District Secretary of Sports and Leisure of the Federal District (2015–2018); Senator for the Federal District (2019–2026).	Raphael Sodre (REDE) Tetê Monteiro (PSOL)	DF do Povo (FE Brasil (PT, PCdoB and PV), PSOL REDE Fed. (PSOL and REDE) and PDT)
131	Erika Kokay; Erika Jucá Kokay	PT; FE Brasil	District Deputy of the Federal District (2003–2011); Federal Deputy of the Federal District (2011–2026).	Giulia Tadini (PSOL) Samuel Domingues (PT)	DF do Povo (FE Brasil (PT, PCdoB and PV), PSOL REDE Fed. (PSOL and REDE) and PDT)
161	Prof. Zanata; Eduardo Rennó Zanata	PSTU	No previous office	(PSTU) (PSTU)	No coalition
222	Michelle Bolsonaro; Michelle de Paula Firmo Reinaldo Bolsonaro	PL	First Lady of Brazil (2019–2022).	Diego Torres (PL) Cristian Viana (PODE)	Propósito e Ação (UPB (UNIÃO and PP), Solidary Renewal Fed. (PRD and Solidariedade), Republicanos, MDB, Democrata, DC, PODE, MOBILIZA)
223	Bia Kicis; Beatriz Kicis Torrents de Sordi	PL	Federal Deputy of the Federal District (2019–2026).	Samuel Kicis (PL) Renato Figueiredo (PL)	Propósito e Ação (UPB (UNIÃO and PP), Solidary Renewal Fed. (PRD and Solidariedade), Republicanos, MDB, Democrata, DC, PODE, MOBILIZA)
290	David Horn; David Horn Pureza	PCO	No previous office	Mauro Sousa (PCO) Ricardo Machado (PCO)	No coalition
300	Sebastião Coelho; Sebastião Coelho da Silva	NOVO	Desembargador of the Court of Justice of the Federal District and Territories (2013–2022).	Ibi Batista (NOVO) Coronel Leonardo (NOVO)	No coalition
360	Tiago Társis hiago Tarsis Adaldo	Agir	No previous office	Sargento Thiago Melo (Agir) Alexandre Nunes (Agir)	No coalition
456	Guto Felício dos Santos; Paulo Augusto Pimenta Felício dos Santos	PSDB	No previous office	Luciana Loureiro (PSDB) Professor Tatá (PSDB)	No coalition
555	Ronaldo Fonseca; Ronaldo Fonseca de Souza	PSD	Federal Deputy for the Federal District (2011–2018); Secretary-General of the Presidency of Brazil (2018).	Professora Eunice Santos (PSD) Dr. Antonio (PSD)	No coalition
700	Marley; Marley Mendonça Alves	Avante	No previous office	Diego Marques (Avante) Reginaldo Silva (Avante)	No coalition
800	Professor Guilherme Amorim; Guilherme de Amorim Lino	UP	No previous office	Tadeu Toniatti (UP) Ivoni Mineiro (UP)	No coalition

== Results ==
=== Governor ===
Candidate	Running mate	Party	First round		Second round	
Candidate	Running mate	Party	Votes	%	Votes	%
Celina Leão (incumbent)	Gustavo Rocha (Republicanos)	Progressistas	825,530	49.93	987,142	57.18
Leandro Grass	Dora Gomes (PV)	Workers' Party	569,930	34.47	739,130	42.82
Paula Belmonte	Everardo Ribeiro	Brazilian Social Democracy Party	140,765	8.51		
Kiko Caputo	Rafael Sampaio	New Party	72,148	4.36		
Ricardo Cappelli	Sofia Carvalho	Brazilian Socialist Party	36,828	2.23		
Samara Mineiro	Thaís Oliveira	Popular Unity	3,958	0.24		
Robson Raymundo	Antônio Guillen	United Socialist Workers' Party	1,640	0.10		
Elisson Freire	Sérgio Padro	Agir	1,172	0.07		
Rico Pinheiro	Cristiane Barros	Brazilian Labour Renewal Party	671	0.04		
Expedito Mendonça	Valmir Barbosa	Workers' Cause Party	595	0.04		
Total			1,653,237	100.00	1,726,272	100.00
Valid votes			1,653,237	90.94		
Invalid votes			89,910	4.95		
Blank votes			74,774	4.11		
Total votes			1,817,921	100.00		
Registered voters/turnout			2,243,988	81.01		

Popular vote (first round)
Leão	49.93%
Grass	34.47%
Belmonte	8.51%
Caputo	4.36%
Cappelli	2.23%
Others	4.90%

=== Senator ===
Candidate	Party	Votes	%
Michelle Bolsonaro	PL	938,496	29.05
Bia Kicis	PL	886,616	27.44
Leila Barros (incumbent)	PDT	686,340	21.25
Erika Kokay	PT	610,950	18.91
Sebastião Coelho	NOVO	67,396	2.09
Guilherme Amorim	UP	14,861	0.46
Guto Felício	PSDB	9,534	0.30
Marley Mendonça	Avante	6,522	0.20
Tiago Társis	PSTU	4,238	0.13
Eduardo Zanata	PSTU	3,572	0.11
David Horn	PCO	2,032	0.06
Total		3,230,557	100.00
Valid votes		3,230,557	88.85
Invalid votes		204,364	5.62
Blank votes		200,921	5.53
Total votes		3,635,842	100.00
Registered voters/turnout		2,243,988	81.01
PL gain from PDT			
PL hold			

Popular vote
Bolsonaro	29.05%
Kicis	27.44%
Barros	21.25%
Kokay	18.91%
Others	3.35%

=== Chamber of Deputies ===
Party or alliance		Votes	%	Seats	+/–
Liberal Party		448,883	27.05	3	▲1
PSOL REDE	Socialism and Liberty Party	238,157	14.35	1	▲1
PSOL REDE	Sustainability Network	1,280	0.08	0	Steady
Brazilian Democratic Movement		214,223	12.91	1	Steady
Republicanos		193,682	11.67	1	▼2
Brazil of Hope	Workers' Party	192,202	11.58	1	Steady
Brazil of Hope	Green Party	44,725	2.70	1	Steady
Brazilian Socialist Party		70,250	4.23	0	Steady
Progressive Union	Brazil Union	66,732	4.02	0	Steady
Progressive Union	Progressistas	39,047	2.35	0	Steady
New Party		25,862	1.56	0	Steady
Social Democratic Party		24,327	1.47	0	Steady
Podemos		22,362	1.35	0	Steady
Mission Party		20,186	1.22	0	New
Democratic Labour Party		15,404	0.93	0	Steady
Avante		9,240	0.56	0	Steady
PSDB Cidadania	Brazilian Social Democracy Party	6,963	0.42	0	Steady
PSDB Cidadania	Cidadania	1,602	0.10	0	Steady
Solidary Renewal	Democratic Renewal Party	6,396	0.39	0	Steady
Solidary Renewal	Solidariedade	3,990	0.24	0	Steady
Christian Democracy		4,350	0.26	0	Steady
National Mobilization		4,002	0.24	0	Steady
Democrata		3,730	0.22	0	Steady
Popular Unity		846	0.05	0	Steady
Workers' Cause Party		388	0.02	0	Steady
Agir		325	0.02	0	Steady
Total		1,659,154	100.00	8	–
Valid votes		1,659,154	91.26		
Invalid votes		59,837	3.29		
Blank votes		99,027	5.45		
Total votes		1,818,018	100.00		
Registered voters/turnout		2,243,988	81.02		

=== Legislative Chamber ===
Party or alliance		Votes	%	+/–
Agir				–
Avante				–
Brazil of Hope	Communist Party of Brazil			–
Brazil of Hope	Green Party			–
Brazil of Hope	Workers' Party			–
Brazilian Communist Party				–
Brazilian Democratic Movement				–
Brazilian Labour Renewal Party				–
Brazilian Socialist Party				–
Christian Democracy				–
Democrata				–
Democratic Labour Party				–
Liberal Party				–
Mission Party				New
National Mobilization				–
New Party				–
Podemos				–
Popular Unity				–
Progressive Union	Brazil Union			–
Progressive Union	Progressistas			–
PSDB Cidadania	Brazilian Social Democracy Party			–
PSDB Cidadania	Cidadania			–
PSOL REDE	Socialism and Liberty Party			–
PSOL REDE	Sustainability Network			–
Republicanos				–
Social Democratic Party				–
Solidary Renewal	Democratic Renewal Party			–
Solidary Renewal	Solidarity			–
United Socialist Workers' Party				–
Workers' Cause Party				–
Total				–
Registered voters/turnout		2,253,132	–	
