= 2022 Federal District gubernatorial election =

2022 Federal District election
- 2 October 2022
- Turnout: 82.40%
- Gubernatorial election
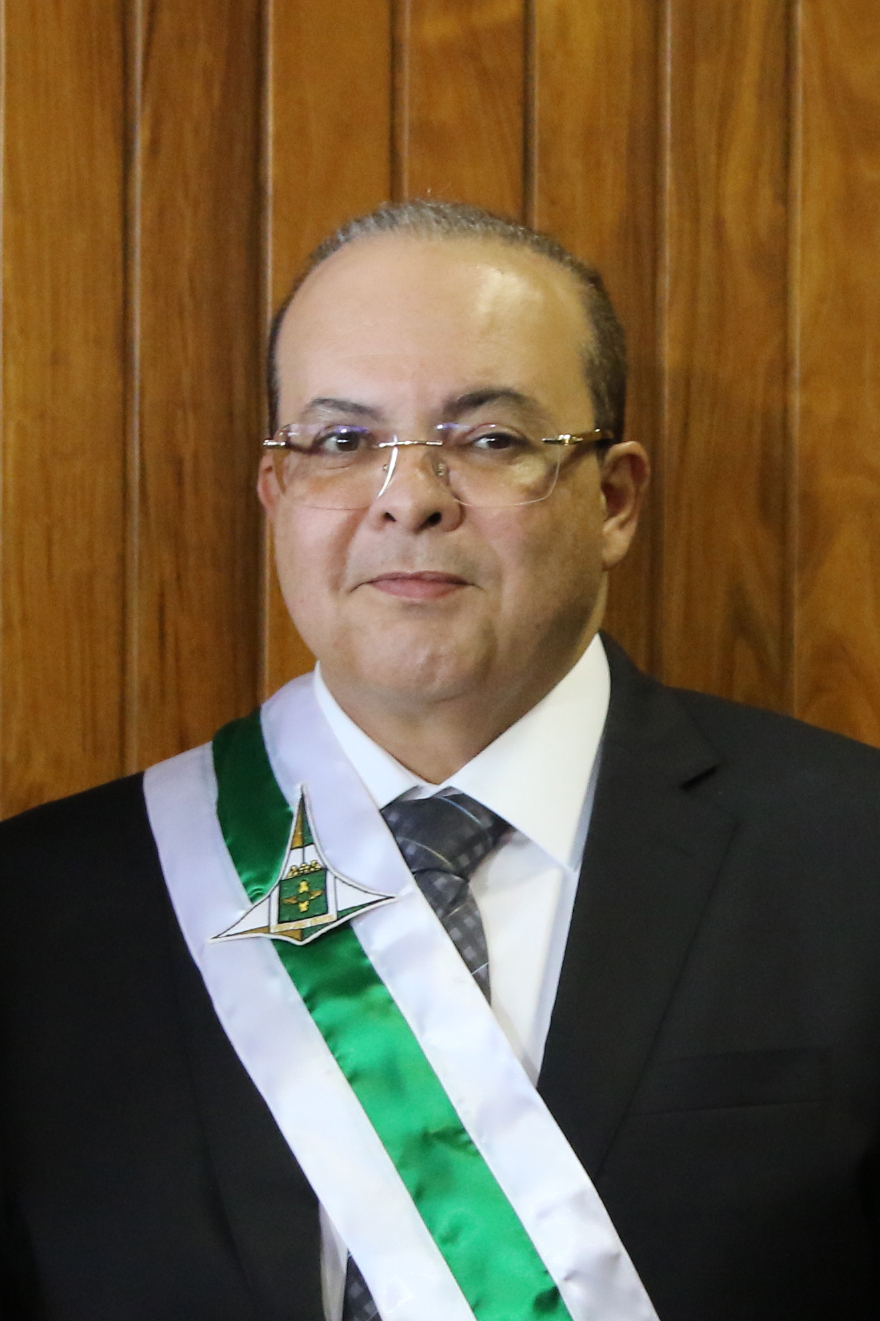

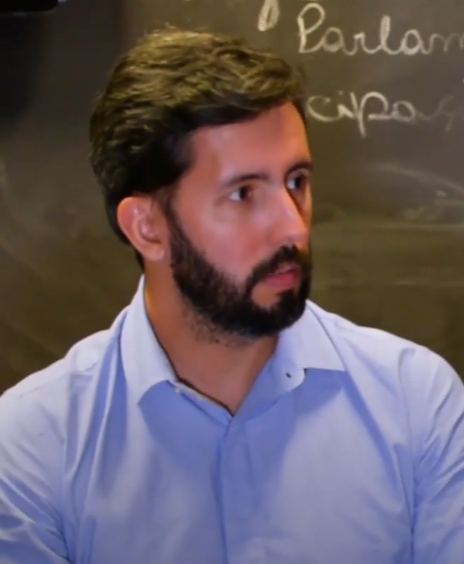
Candidate	Ibaneis Rocha	Leandro Grass
Party	MDB	PV
Alliance	United for the DF	Brazil of Hope
Running mate	Celina Leão	Olgamir Amancia
Popular vote	832,633	434,587
Percentage	50.31%	26.26%
- Candidate with the most votes per electoral zone (19): Ibaneis Rocha (18); Leandro Grass (1)
Governor before election
Ibaneis Rocha
MDB
Elected Governor
Ibaneis Rocha
MDB
- Senatorial election
- 2 October 2022 (one-only round)
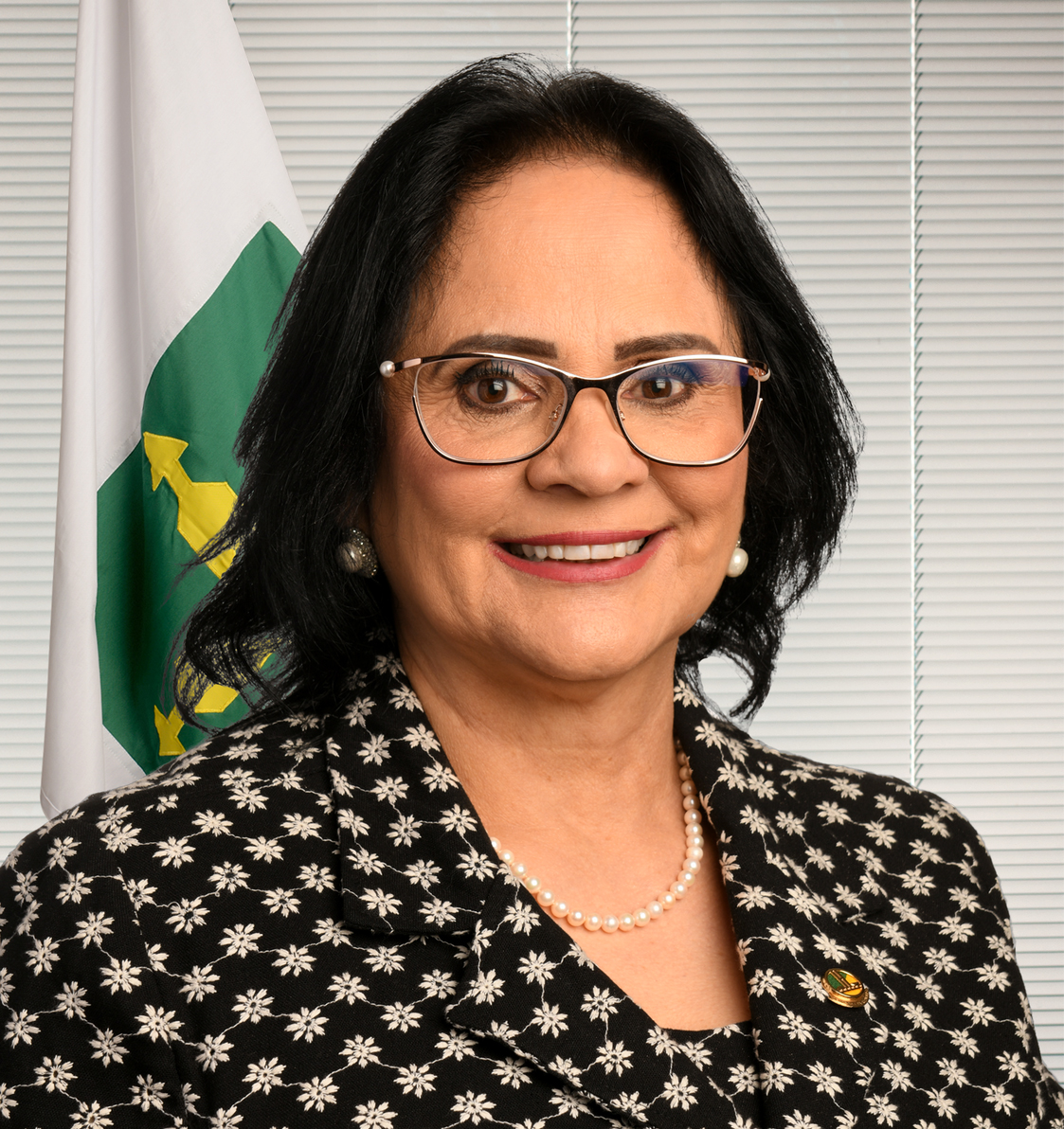

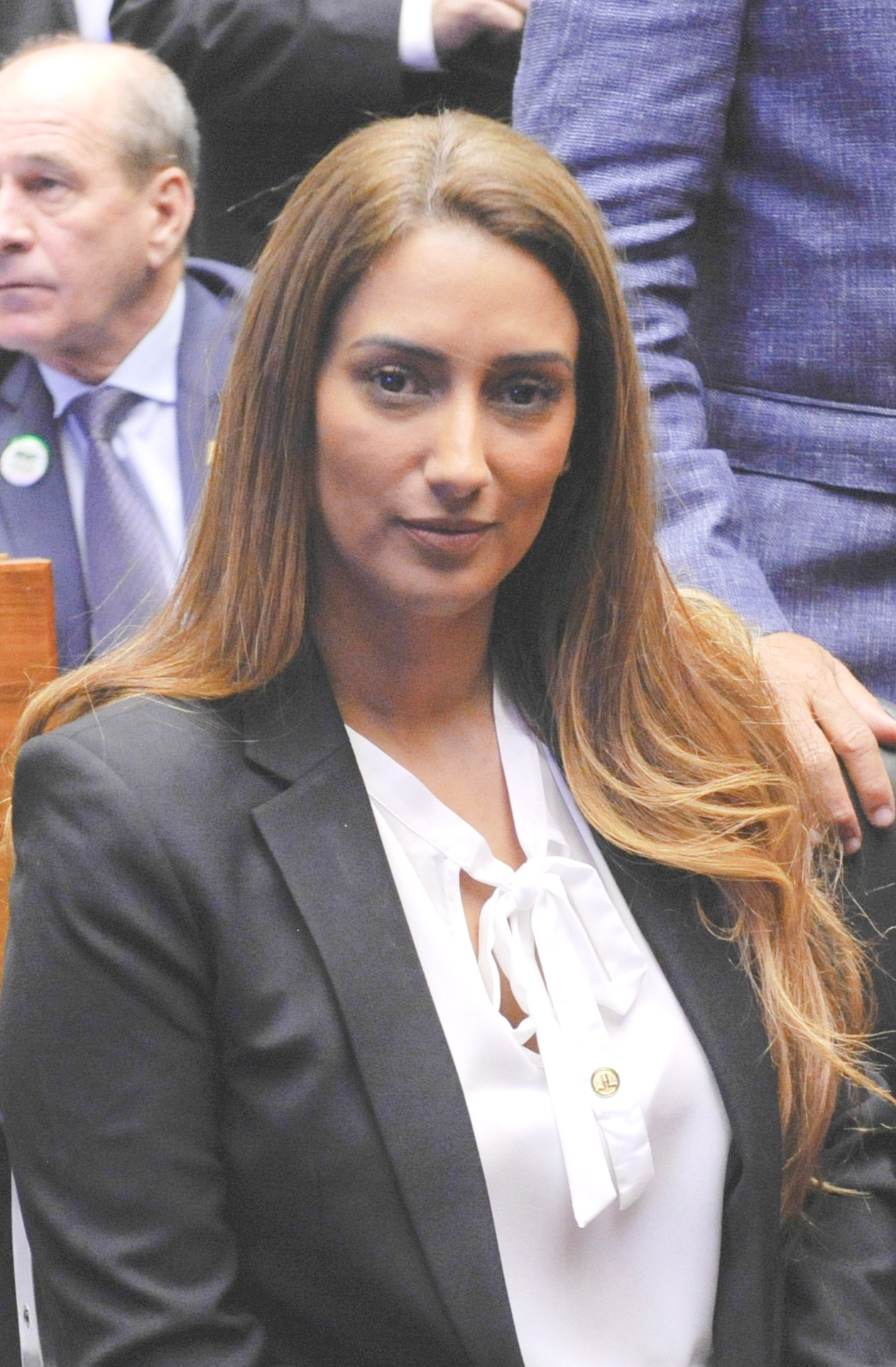
Candidate	Damares Alves	Flávia Arruda
Party	Republicanos	PL
Alliance	Union for Brasília	United for the DF
Popular vote	714,562	429,676
Percentage	45.25%	27.25%
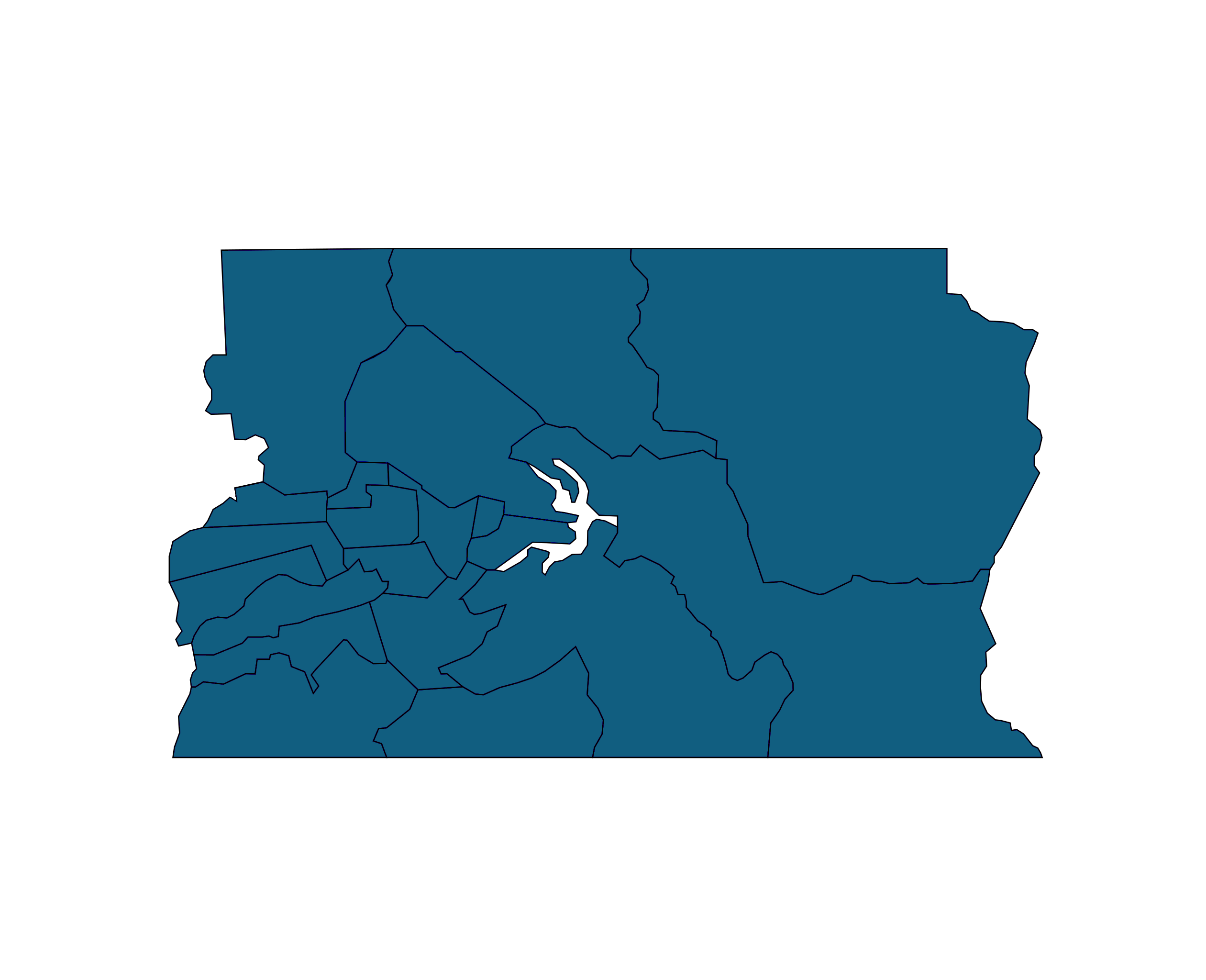
- Candidate with the most votes per electoral zone (19): Damares Alvas (19)
Senator before election
José Reguffe
Independent
Elected Senator
Damares Alves
Republicanos

The 2022 Federal District election was held on 2 October as part of the 2022 Brazilian general election. The district electors able to vote in a Governor and Vice Governor, one Senator, 8 members for the Chamber of Deputies and 24 members for the Legislative Chamber.

The Governor and Vice Governor elected in this election will have a longer term. This is due to a Constitutional Amendment that fixed the new inauguration date for Governors and Vice Governors for 6 January subsequent to the election.

Governor Ibaneis Rocha (MDB) was eligible for a second term and ran for re-election. Rocha was re-elected in first round with 50.3% of valid votes. Legislate Chamber lawmaker Leandro Grass (PV) placed second with 26.26% of valid votes and former governor Paulo Octávio (PSD) placed third with 7.48% of valid votes.

== Candidates ==
=== Governor ===
Party	Candidate	Most relevant political office or occupation	Party	Running mate	Coalition	Electoral number
Democratic Labour Party (PDT)	Leila Barros	Senator for the Federal District (since 2019)	Democratic Labour Party (PDT)	Guilherme Campelo	—N/a	12
Brazilian Labour Party (PTB)	Elziovan Moreno	Military police colonel	Brazilian Labour Party (PTB)	Luiz Gustavo	—N/a	14
Brazilian Democratic Movement (MDB)	Ibaneis Rocha	Governor of the Federal District (since 2019)	Progressistas (PP)	Celina Leão	United for the DF: Brazilian Democratic Movement (MDB); Progressistas (PP); Liberal Party (PL); Avante; Agir; Republican Party of the Social Order (PROS); Solidariedade	15
United Socialist Workers' Party (PSTU)	Robson Raymundo	High school teacher	United Socialist Workers' Party (PSTU)	Eduardo Zanata	—N/a	16
Brazilian Communist Party (PCB)	Teodoro da Cruz	Lawyer	Brazilian Communist Party (PCB)	Jamil Magari	—N/a	21
Christian Democracy (DC)	Lucas Salles	Higher education teacher	Christian Democracy (DC)	Suelene Balduino	—N/a	27
Workers' Cause Party (PCO)	Renan Arruda	Retired worker	Workers' Cause Party (PCO)	Mauro Moura	—N/a	29
Green Party (PV)	Leandro Grass	Member of the Legislative Chamber of the Federal District (2019–2023)	Communist Party of Brazil (PCdoB)	Olgamir Amancia	Brazil of Hope Federation: Workers' Party (PT); Communist Party of Brazil (PCdoB); Green Party (PV)	43
Brazilian Social Democracy Party (PSDB)	Izalci Lucas	Senator for the Federal District (since 2019)	Brazilian Labour Renewal Party (PRTB)	Beth Cupertino	To Take Care of the People: Always Forward; Brazilian Social Democracy Party (PSDB); Cidadania; Brazilian Labour Renewal Party (PRTB)	45
Socialism and Liberty Party (PSOL)	Keka Bagno	Social assistant	Socialism and Liberty Party (PSOL)	Toni de Castro	PSOL REDE Federation: Socialism and Liberty Party (PSOL); Sustainability Network (REDE)	50
Social Democratic Party (PSD)	Paulo Octávio	Governor of the Federal District (2010)	Social Christian Party (PSC)	Felipe Belmonte	DF for All: Social Democratic Party (PSD); Social Christian Party (PSC); Podemos (PODE); Patriota; Brazilian Woman's Party (PMB)	55

=== Senator ===
Party	Candidate	Most relevant political office or occupation	Party	Candidates for Alternate Senators	Coalition	Electoral number
Republicanos	Damares Alves	Minister of Woman, Family and Human Rights (2019–2022)	Brazil Union (UNIÃO)	1st alternate senator: Manoel Arruda	Union for Brasília: Republicanos; Brazil Union (UNIÃO)	100
Republicanos	Damares Alves	Minister of Woman, Family and Human Rights (2019–2022)	Republicanos	2nd alternate senator: Egmar Tavares	Union for Brasília: Republicanos; Brazil Union (UNIÃO)	100
Democratic Labour Party (PDT)	Joe Valle	Member of the Legislative Chamber of the Federal District (2011–2019)	Democratic Labour Party (PDT)	1st alternate senator: Georges Michel	—N/a	123
Democratic Labour Party (PDT)	Joe Valle	Member of the Legislative Chamber of the Federal District (2011–2019)	Democratic Labour Party (PDT)	2nd alternate senator: Fabíola Consttâncio	—N/a	123
Workers' Party (PT)	Rosilene Corrêa	Retired public servant	Workers' Party (PT)	1st alternate senator: Mariana Rosa	Brazil of Hope Federation: Workers' Party (PT); Communist Party of Brazil (PCdoB); Green Party (PV)	133
Workers' Party (PT)	Rosilene Corrêa	Retired public servant	Workers' Party (PT)	2nd alternate senator: Saulo Dias	Brazil of Hope Federation: Workers' Party (PT); Communist Party of Brazil (PCdoB); Green Party (PV)	133
Brazilian Labour Party (PTB)	Marcelo Hipólito	Federal public servant	Brazilian Labour Party (PTB)	1st alternate senator: Sidney Pessôa	—N/a	142
Brazilian Labour Party (PTB)	Marcelo Hipólito	Federal public servant	Brazilian Labour Party (PTB)	2nd alternate senator: Rachib Saad	—N/a	142
United Socialist Workers' Party (PSTU)	Elcimara de Souza	Federal public servant	United Socialist Workers' Party (PSTU)	1st alternate senator: Renato Ferreira	—N/a	161
United Socialist Workers' Party (PSTU)	Elcimara de Souza	Federal public servant	United Socialist Workers' Party (PSTU)	2nd alternate senator: Sílvio Soares Filho	—N/a	161
Sustainability Network (REDE)	Pedro Ivo Batista	Environmentalist	Socialism and Liberty Party (PSOL)	1st alternate senator: Márcio Antônio Sanches	PSOL REDE Federation: Socialism and Liberty Party (PSOL); Sustainability Network (REDE)	180
Sustainability Network (REDE)	Pedro Ivo Batista	Environmentalist	Socialism and Liberty Party (PSOL)	2nd alternate senator: Manoel Lima	PSOL REDE Federation: Socialism and Liberty Party (PSOL); Sustainability Network (REDE)	180
Liberal Party (PL)	Flávia Arruda	Secretary of Government (2021–2022)	Brazilian Democratic Movement (MDB)	1st alternate senator: Luiz Pastore	United for the DF: Brazilian Democratic Movement (MDB); Liberal Party (PL); Avante; Agir; Republican Party of the Social Order (PROS); Solidariedade	222
Liberal Party (PL)	Flávia Arruda	Secretary of Government (2021–2022)	Liberal Party (PL)	2nd alternate senator: Godofredo Gonçalves	United for the DF: Brazilian Democratic Movement (MDB); Liberal Party (PL); Avante; Agir; Republican Party of the Social Order (PROS); Solidariedade	222
Christian Democracy (DC)	José Gabriel Souza	Military police lieutenant colonel	Christian Democracy (DC)	1st alternate senator: Joel Amaral	—N/a	270
Christian Democracy (DC)	José Gabriel Souza	Military police lieutenant colonel	Christian Democracy (DC)	2nd alternate senator: Virgilio Macedo	—N/a	270
Workers' Cause Party (PCO)	Expedito Mendonça	Retired worker	Workers' Cause Party (PCO)	1st alternate senator: Ivo Brito	—N/a	290
Workers' Cause Party (PCO)	Expedito Mendonça	Retired worker	Workers' Cause Party (PCO)	2nd alternate senator: Valmir Barbosa	—N/a	290
Social Democratic Party (PSD)	Carlos Rodrigues	Lawyer	Social Democratic Party (PSD)	1st alternate senator: Fabiana Lacerda	DF for All: Social Democratic Party (PSD); Social Christian Party (PSC); Podemos (PODE); Patriota; Brazilian Woman's Party (PMB)	555
Social Democratic Party (PSD)	Carlos Rodrigues	Lawyer	Podemos (PODE)	2nd alternate senator: João Cândido	DF for All: Social Democratic Party (PSD); Social Christian Party (PSC); Podemos (PODE); Patriota; Brazilian Woman's Party (PMB)	555

== Debates ==
For the first time in the Brazilian general elections since 1989, television and radio stations, newspapers and news websites group themselves into pools to hold gubernatorial debates, by request of the campaigns in order to reduce the number of debates scheduled for the 2022 elections.

As of 29 August 2022, the following presidential debates were held or scheduled (times in UTC−03:00):

2022 Federal District gubernatorial election debates
No.	Date, time and location	Hosts	Moderators	Participants							
Key: P Present A Absent W Withdrawn N Not invited				MDB	PSDB	PV	PDT	PSOL	PSD	PTB	PSB
Key: P Present A Absent W Withdrawn N Not invited				Rocha	Lucas	Grass	Barros	Bagno	Octávio	Moreno	Parente
1	Sunday, 7 August 2022, 21:00, Brasília	Band Brasília and BandNews FM Brasília	Millena Machado	P	P	P	P	P	P	N	P
2	Thursday, 18 August 2022, 20:30, Brasília	Correio Braziliense and TV Brasília	Gláucia Guimarães	A	P	P	P	P	P	N	P
3	Tuesday, 23 August 2022, 19:00, Brasília	Metrópoles	Larissa Alvarenga	P	P	P	P	P	P	N	P
4	Saturday, 17 September 2022, 18:30, Brasília	SBT Brasília and NovaBrasil FM Brasília	Felipe Malta	A	P	P	P	P	P	P	W
5	Tuesday, 27 September 2022, 22:30, Brasília	TV Globo Brasília	Antônio de Castro	P	P	P	P	P	P	P	W

== Results ==
=== Governor ===
Candidate	Running mate	Party	Votes	%
Ibaneis Rocha (incumbent)	Celina Leão (PP)	MDB	832,633	50.31
Leandro Grass	Olgamir Amância (PCdoB)	PV	434,587	26.26
Paulo Octávio	Felipe Belmonte (PSC)	PSD	123,715	7.48
Elziovan Moreno	Luiz Gustavo	PTB	94,100	5.69
Leila Barros	Guilherme Campelo	PDT	79,597	4.81
Izalci Lucas	Beth Cupertino (PRTB)	PSDB	70,584	4.26
Keka Bagno	Toni de Castro	PSOL	13,613	0.82
Lucas Salles	Suelene Balduíno	DC	4,218	0.25
Teodoro da Cruz	Jamil Magari	PCB	1,155	0.07
Robson da Silva	Eduardo Zanata	PSTU	841	0.05
Renan Arruda	Mauro Moura	PCO	373	
Total			1,655,043	100.00
Valid votes			1,655,043	91.57
Invalid votes			86,472	4.78
Blank votes			65,969	3.65
Total votes			1,807,484	100.00
Registered voters/turnout			2,193,440	82.40
MDB hold				

=== Senator ===
Candidate	Party	Votes	%
Damares Alves	Republicanos	714,562	45.31
Flávia Arruda	PL	429,676	27.25
Rosilene Corrêa	PT	356,198	22.59
Joe Valle	PDT	49,310	3.13
Yara Prado	PSDB	9,676	
Carlos Rodrigues	PSD	9,366	0.59
Pedro Ivo Batista	REDE	8,133	0.52
José Gabriel Souza	DC	4,795	0.30
Elcimara de Souza	PSTU	2,473	0.16
Hélio José	Solidariedade	2,069	
Marcelo Hipólito	PTB	1,841	0.12
Expedito Mendonça	PCO	613	0.04
Total		1,576,967	100.00
Valid votes		1,576,967	87.25
Invalid votes		111,442	6.17
Blank votes		119,075	6.59
Total votes		1,807,484	100.00
Registered voters/turnout		2,193,440	82.40
Republicanos gain from Independent			

=== Chamber of Deputies ===
Party or alliance		Votes	%	Seats	+/–
Republicanos		301,307	18.74	3	▲2
Liberal Party		275,496	17.14	2	▲1
Brazil of Hope	Workers' Party	227,891	14.18	1	Steady
Brazil of Hope	Green Party	56,588	3.52	1	Steady
Brazil of Hope	Communist Party of Brazil	6,525	0.41	0	Steady
Brazilian Democratic Movement		162,125	10.09	1	▲1
Brazilian Socialist Party		136,796	8.51	0	Steady
Progressistas		117,553	7.31	0	▼1
Brazil Union		82,274	5.12	0	New
Social Democratic Party		71,470	4.45	0	Steady
PSOL REDE Federation	Socialism and Liberty Party	46,298	2.88	0	Steady
PSOL REDE Federation	Sustainability Network	5,791	0.36	0	Steady
New Party		27,951	1.74	0	Steady
Avante		11,820	0.74	0	Steady
Podemos		9,516	0.59	0	Steady
Democratic Labour Party		9,513	0.59	0	Steady
Agir		7,802	0.49	0	Steady
Party of National Mobilization		7,545	0.47	0	Steady
Social Christian Party		7,280	0.45	0	Steady
Republican Party of the Social Order		5,765	0.36	0	Steady
Always Forward	Brazilian Social Democracy Party	5,545	0.34	0	Steady
Always Forward	Cidadania	4,260	0.27	0	▼1
Solidariedade		4,961	0.31	0	Steady
Brazilian Labour Party		4,548	0.28	0	Steady
Christian Democracy		3,816	0.24	0	Steady
Patriota		3,763	0.23	0	Steady
Popular Unity		1,559	0.10	0	New
Brazilian Labour Renewal Party		774	0.05	0	Steady
Workers' Cause Party		546	0.03	0	Steady
United Socialist Workers' Party		441	0.03	0	Steady
Total		1,607,519	100.00	8	–
Valid votes		1,607,519	88.94		
Invalid votes		85,311	4.72		
Blank votes		114,654	6.34		
Total votes		1,807,484	100.00		
Registered voters/turnout		2,193,440	82.40		

=== Legislative Chamber ===
Party or alliance		Votes	%	Seats	+/–
Liberal Party		221,654	13.35	4	▲3
Brazilian Democratic Movement		155,718	9.38	3	▲2
Brazil of Hope	Workers' Party	137,563	8.28	3	▲1
Brazil of Hope	Green Party	24,025	1.45	0	Steady
Brazil of Hope	Communist Party of Brazil	3,918	0.24	0	Steady
PSOL REDE Federation	Socialism and Liberty Party	114,051	6.87	2	▲1
PSOL REDE Federation	Sustainability Network	3,988	0.24	0	▼1
Agir		110,392	6.65	2	▲1
Progressistas		104,862	6.32	2	▲1
Social Democratic Party		97,242	5.86	2	▲1
Brazil Union		97,097	5.85	1	New
Republicanos		95,236	5.74	1	▼1
Party of National Mobilization		75,661	4.56	1	▲1
Brazilian Socialist Party		74,974	4.52	1	▼1
Avante		56,851	3.42	1	▼1
Always Forward	Cidadania	43,132	2.60	1	▲1
Always Forward	Brazilian Social Democracy Party	25,728	1.55	0	Steady
Patriota		41,417	2.49	0	Steady
Social Christian Party		36,277	2.18	0	▼1
Podemos		29,647	1.79	0	▼1
Republican Party of the Social Order		25,705	1.55	0	▼2
New Party		18,995	1.14	0	Steady
Brazilian Labour Party		18,863	1.14	0	Steady
Democratic Labour Party		17,625	1.06	0	▼2
Brazilian Labour Renewal Party		14,795	0.89	0	Steady
Brazilian Woman's Party		5,808	0.35	0	Steady
Solidariedade		4,054	0.24	0	Steady
Christian Democracy		3,368	0.20	0	Steady
Popular Unity		1,190	0.07	0	New
United Socialist Workers' Party		342	0.02	0	Steady
Workers' Cause Party		209	0.01	0	Steady
Total		1,660,387	100.00	24	–
Valid votes		1,660,387	91.97		
Invalid votes		56,446	3.13		
Blank votes		88,490	4.90		
Total votes		1,805,323	100.00		
Registered voters/turnout		2,193,440	82.31		
