= Celina Leão =

Brazilian business administrator and politician

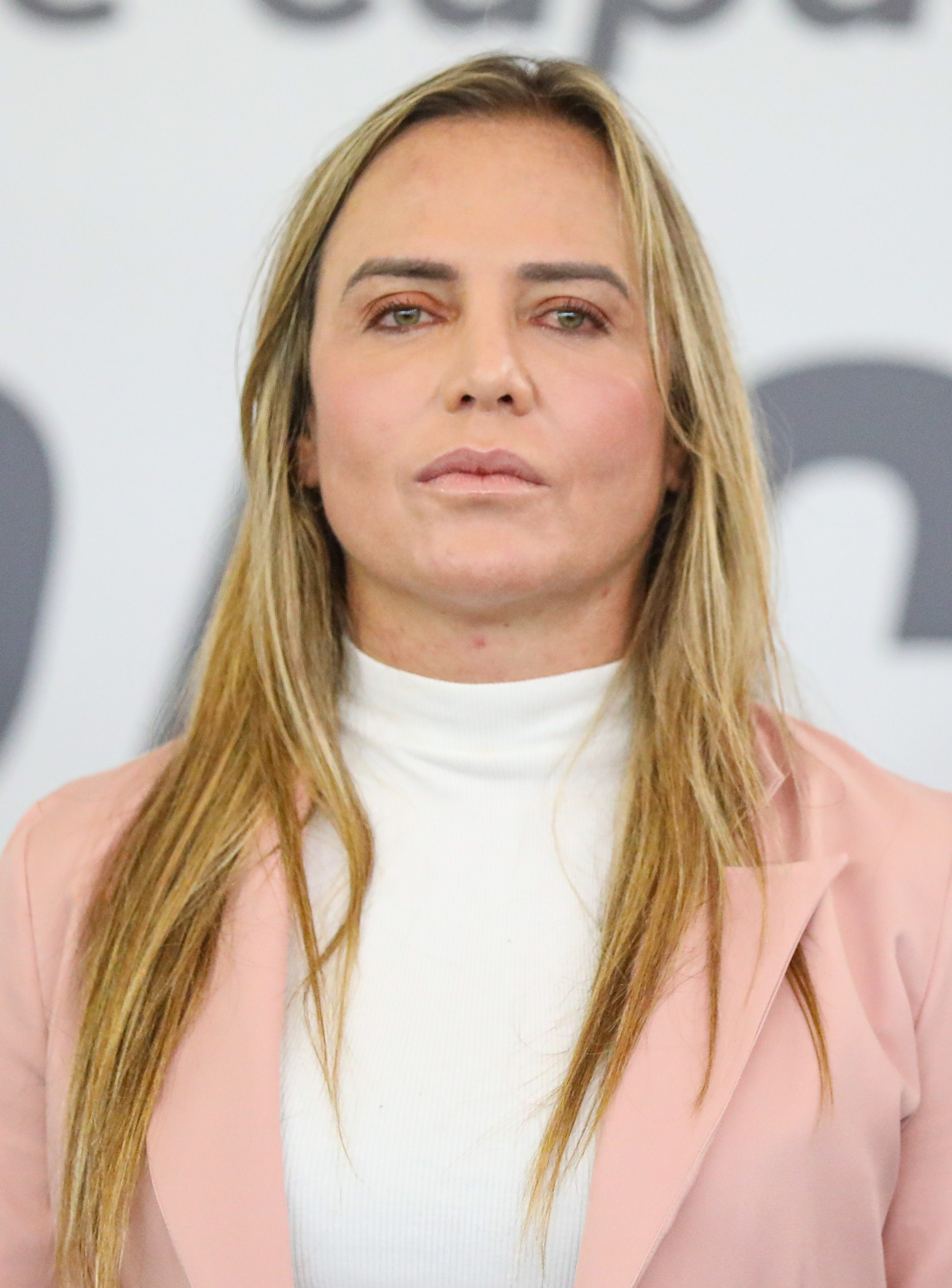

Governor of the Federal District
- Incumbent
- Assumed office 30 March 2026; Acting: 8 January 2023 – 15 March 2023
- Lieutenant: None
- Preceded by: Ibaneis Rocha

Lieutenant Governor of the Federal District
- In office 1 January 2023 – 30 March 2026
- Governor: Ibaneis Rocha
- Preceded by: Paco Britto

Member of the Chamber of Deputies
- In office 1 February 2019 – 1 January 2023
- Constituency: Federal District

Member of the Legislative Chamber of the Federal District
- In office 1 January 2011 – 1 January 2019
- Constituency: At-large

Personal details
- Born: Celina Leão Hizim; 2 March 1977 (age 49) Goiânia, Goiás, Brazil
- Party: PP (since 2018)
- Other political affiliations: PSDB (2005–2009); PMN (2009–2011); PSD (2011–2013); PDT (2013–2016); PPS (2016–2018)
- Profession: Businesswoman

Celina Leão Hizim Ferreira (born 2 March 1977) is a Brazilian business administrator and politician affiliated to the Progressistas (PP), who currently serves as the Governor of the Federal District, having succeeded Ibaneis Rocha after his resignation to run for the Federal Senate.

Leão was elected in the first round as Vice-Governor in 2022, and served only 8 days before assuming the interim governorship after the removal of her running mate Rocha for 90 days by the Supreme Federal Court Justice Alexandre de Moraes. Ibaneis was removed after being accused of ignoring security flaws during the 8 January Brasília attacks. The decision to remove Ibaneis from office ended up being endorsed in plenary of the Supreme Federal Court by 9 votes to 2, but it was later revoked by Alexandre de Moraes on 15 March 2023, resulting in Leão resuming her post as Vice-Governor.

Leão is a former federal deputy and former state deputy, and she previously served as a president of the Legislative Chamber of the Federal District.

== Political career ==
In February 2016, after Cristovam Buarque and José Reguffe decided to leave the Democratic Labour Party she also left the political party. A month later, she decided to join the Popular Socialist Party, where she stayed until she decided to left in March 2018. Soon after, she joined the Progressistas (PP), after being invited to run for federal deputy.

== Controversies ==
In March 2017, the Court of Justice of the Federal District and Territories received a complaint from the Public Ministry and decided to turn Celina and five other district deputies defendants for passive corruption, as part of the so-called Operation Drácon. According to investigations, in 2015, the defendants asked for bribes from companies providing ICU services in the public network of the state. The state deputy appealed to the Superior Court of Justice (STJ) in an attempt to annul the process, claiming that the evidence had been obtained illegally because it had been recorded on the complainant's cell phone. The Superior Court of Justice rejected the appeal.

== Electoral history ==
Year	Election	Party	Office	Coalition	Partners	Party	Votes	Percent	Result
2010	District Elections of the Federal District	PMN	District Deputy	Progressive Mobilization (PP, PMN)	—N/a		7,771	0.55%	Elected
2014	District Elections of the Federal District	PDT	District Deputy	We Are All Brasília II (PSB, PDT, SD)	—N/a		12,670	0.83%	Elected
2018	District Elections of the Federal District	PP	Federal Deputy	To Make the Difference I (MDB, PP, PSL, Avante)	—N/a		31,610	2.20%	Elected
2022	District Elections of the Federal District	PP	Vice Governor	United for DF (MDB, PP, PL, Avante, Agir, PROS, Solidariedade)	Ibaneis Rocha	MDB	832,633	50.31%	Elected

Political offices
Preceded by Paco Britto	Vice Governor of the Federal District; 2023–2026	Vacant
Preceded by Ibaneis Rocha	Governor of the Federal District; 2026–present	Incumbent
Order of precedence
Preceded by Governors of State	Brazilian order of precedence 19th in line as Governor of the Federal District	Followed by Senators
