= Leandro Grass =

Brazilian politician (born 1985)

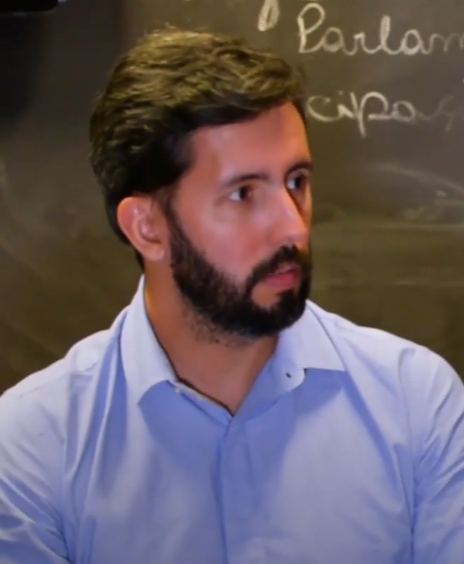
- Grass in 2018

President of the National Institute of Historic and Artistic Heritage
- In office 11 January 2023 – 4 February 2026
- President: Luiz Inácio Lula da Silva
- Preceded by: Larissa Peixoto Dutra
- Succeeded by: Deyvesson Alves Gusmão

Member of the Legislative Chamber of the Federal District
- In office 1 January 2019 – 1 January 2023

Personal details
- Born: 15 June 1985 (age 41)
- Party: Green Party (since 2022)

Leandro Antonio Grass Peixoto (born 15 June 1985) is a Brazilian politician who served as president of the National Institute of Historic and Artistic Heritage from 2023 to 2026. From 2019 to 2022, he was a member of the Legislative Chamber of the Federal District. In the 2022 gubernatorial election, he was a candidate for governor of the Federal District. He is running for the office again in 2026 gubernatorial election.
