= Rodrigo Rollemberg =

Brazilian politician (born 1959)

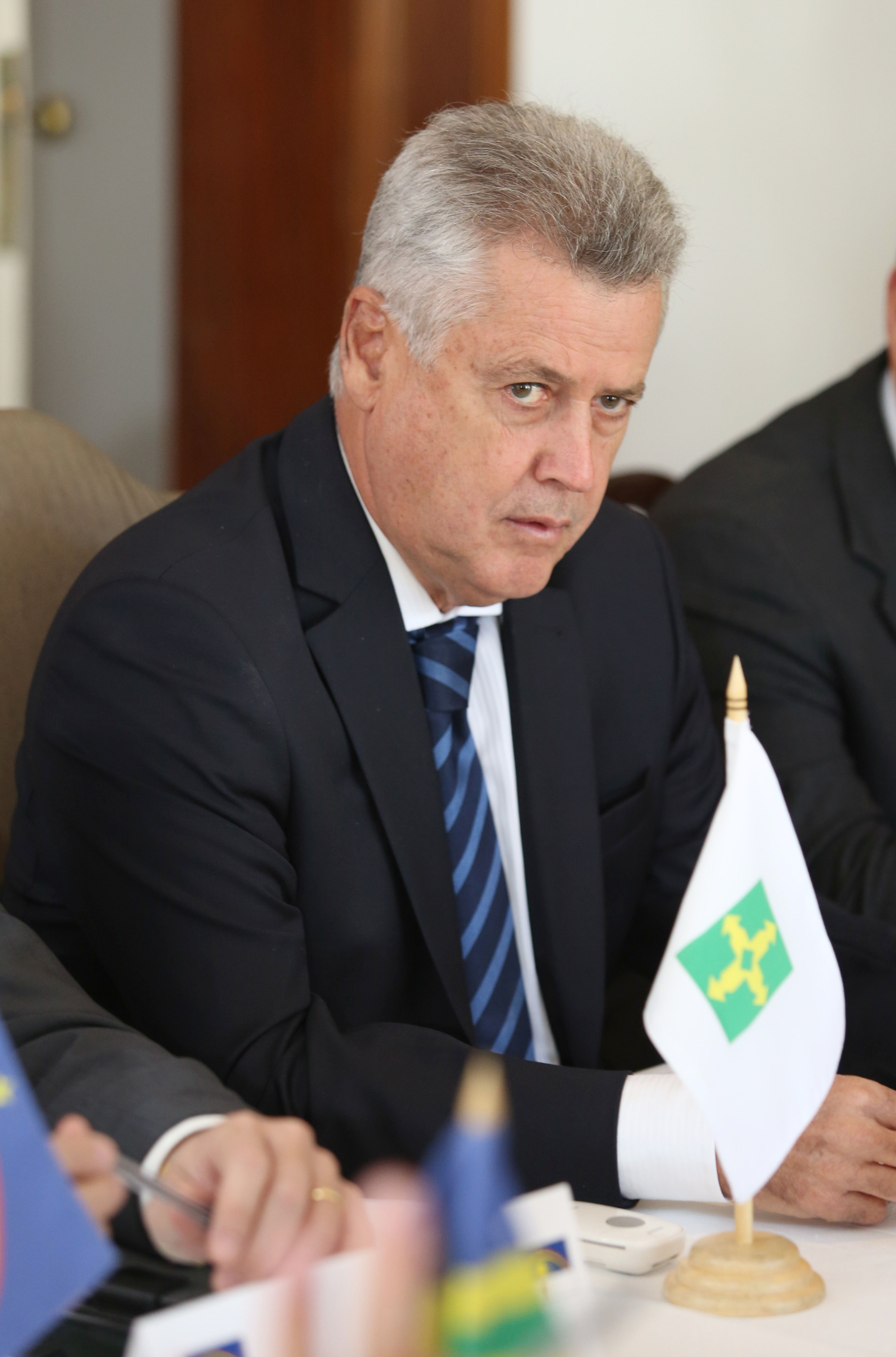
- Rollemberg in 2016

Governor of the Federal District
- In office 1 January 2015 – 1 January 2019
- Vice Governor: Renato Santana
- Preceded by: Agnelo Queiroz
- Succeeded by: Ibaneis Rocha

Senator for the Federal District
- In office 1 February 2011 – 1 January 2015

Member of the Chamber of Deputies
- Incumbent
- Assumed office 31 July 2025
- Constituency: Federal District
- In office 1 February 2007 – 1 February 2011
- Constituency: Federal District

Member of the Legislative Chamber of the Federal District
- In office 1 January 1999 – 1 January 2003
- Constituency: At-large

Personal details
- Born: Rodrigo Sobral Rollemberg; July 13, 1959 (age 67) Rio de Janeiro, Brazil
- Party: PSB (1985–present)
- Spouse: Márcia Helena Gonçalves
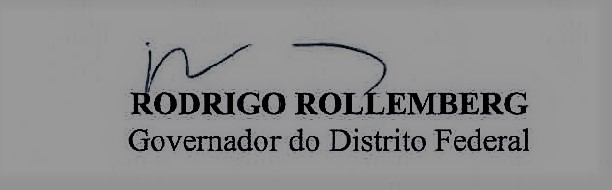
- Signature

Rodrigo Sobral Rollemberg (born July 13, 1959) is a Brazilian politician and member of the Brazilian Socialist Party (PSB). He served as governor of the Federal District from 2015 to 2019.

Rollemberg won the 2014 Federal District gubernatorial election on October 5, 2014, with 812,036 votes, or 55.56% of the vote. He defeated the Party of the Republic (PR) gubernatorial candidate Jofran Frejat, who placed second with 649,587 votes, or 44.44%.

Following his election victory, Rollemberg pledged to hold the government of the Federal District more accountable. He also promised to create a "accountability council," composed of civic leaders and private citizens. Rollemberg took office on January 1, 2015, succeeding outgoing Governor Agnelo Queiroz.

== Early life and education ==
Born in 1959 in the city of Rio de Janeiro, Rollemberg moved to Brasília in 1960. He graduated in History from the University of Brasília in 1983.

Political offices
Preceded by Agnelo Queiroz	Governor of the Federal District; 2015–2019	Succeeded by Ibaneis Rocha
