= Maria de Lourdes Abadia =

Brazilian politician

The Honourable Maria de Lourdes Abadia
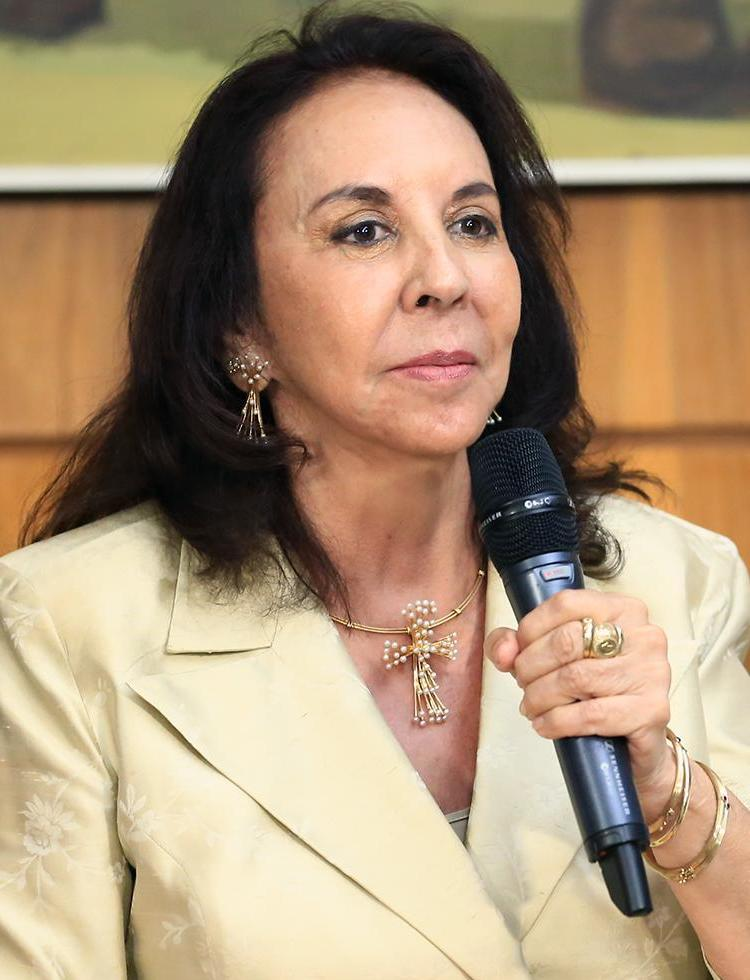

Governor of Federal District
- In office 2006–2007
- Preceded by: Joaquim Roriz
- Succeeded by: José Roberto Arruda

Personal details
- Born: August 14, 1944 (age 81) Bela Vista de Goiás

Maria de Lourdes Abadia (born August 14, 1944) is a Brazilian social worker and politician. She was the Governor of Federal District of Brazil in 2006.
