= Erika Kokay =

Brazilian politician

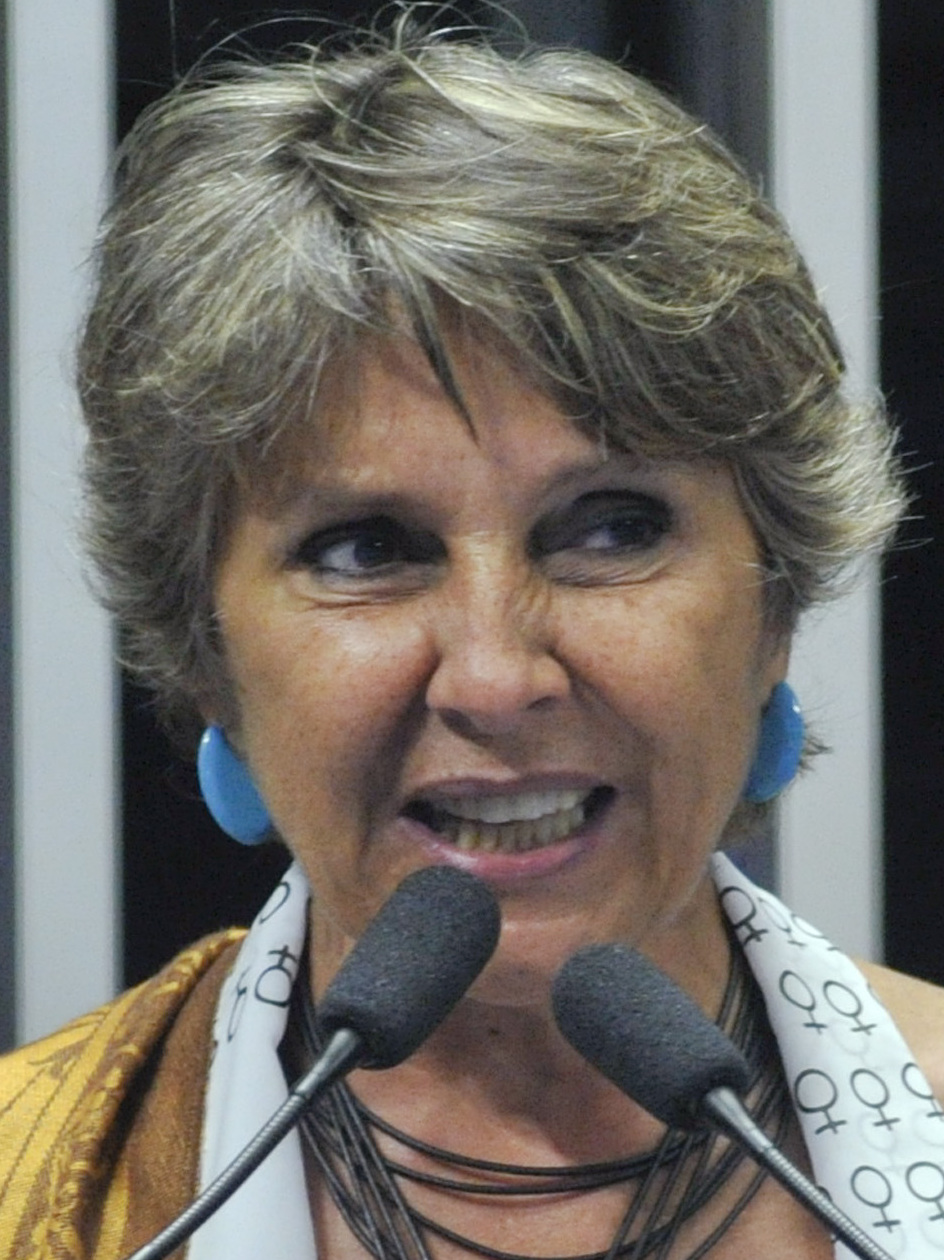
- Kokay in 2015

Member of the Chamber of Deputies
- Incumbent
- Assumed office 1 February 2011
- Constituency: Federal District

Member of the Legislative Chamber of the Federal District
- In office 1 February 2003 – 1 February 2011
- Constituency: At-large

Personal details
- Born: Erika Jucá Kokay; 15 August 1957 (age 69) Fortaleza, Ceará, Brazil
- Party: PT (since 1989)
- Profession: Psychologist

Erika Jucá Kokay (born 15 August 1957) is a Brazilian politician. Although born in Ceará, she has spent her political career representing the Federal District, having served as state representative since 2011.

== Personal life ==
Kokay was born to Lajos Ferenc Kokay and Maria do Perpétuo Socorro Jucá. Prior to becoming a politician Kokay worked as a banker. Kokay has also worked as a syndicalist since 1992, and is a member and past president of the trade union Central Única dos Trabalhadores.

== Political career ==
Kokay voted against the impeachment motion of then-president Dilma Rousseff. Kokay voted against the 2017 Brazilian labor reform, and she would vote in favor of a corruption investigation into Rousseff's successor Michel Temer.

Kokay is fervently against the nonpartisan school bill, stating that it would limit free speech in the educational system and make students "enemies of the nation". Kokay supported the National Truth Commission which investigates crimes committed by the military dictatorship in Brazil from 1946 to 1988. She is a supporter of LGBTQ rights, which was a central theme of her 2018 re-election campaign.

She was investigated in April 2019 for allegedly misusing funds after requesting that one of her peers be investigated, Kokay claimed that she was being investigated in retaliation and that she was "completely calm" regarding the potencial outcome.

In 2022, she was re-elected for her fourth term as a Federal Deputy for the Federal District.
