= José Reguffe =

Brazilian politician

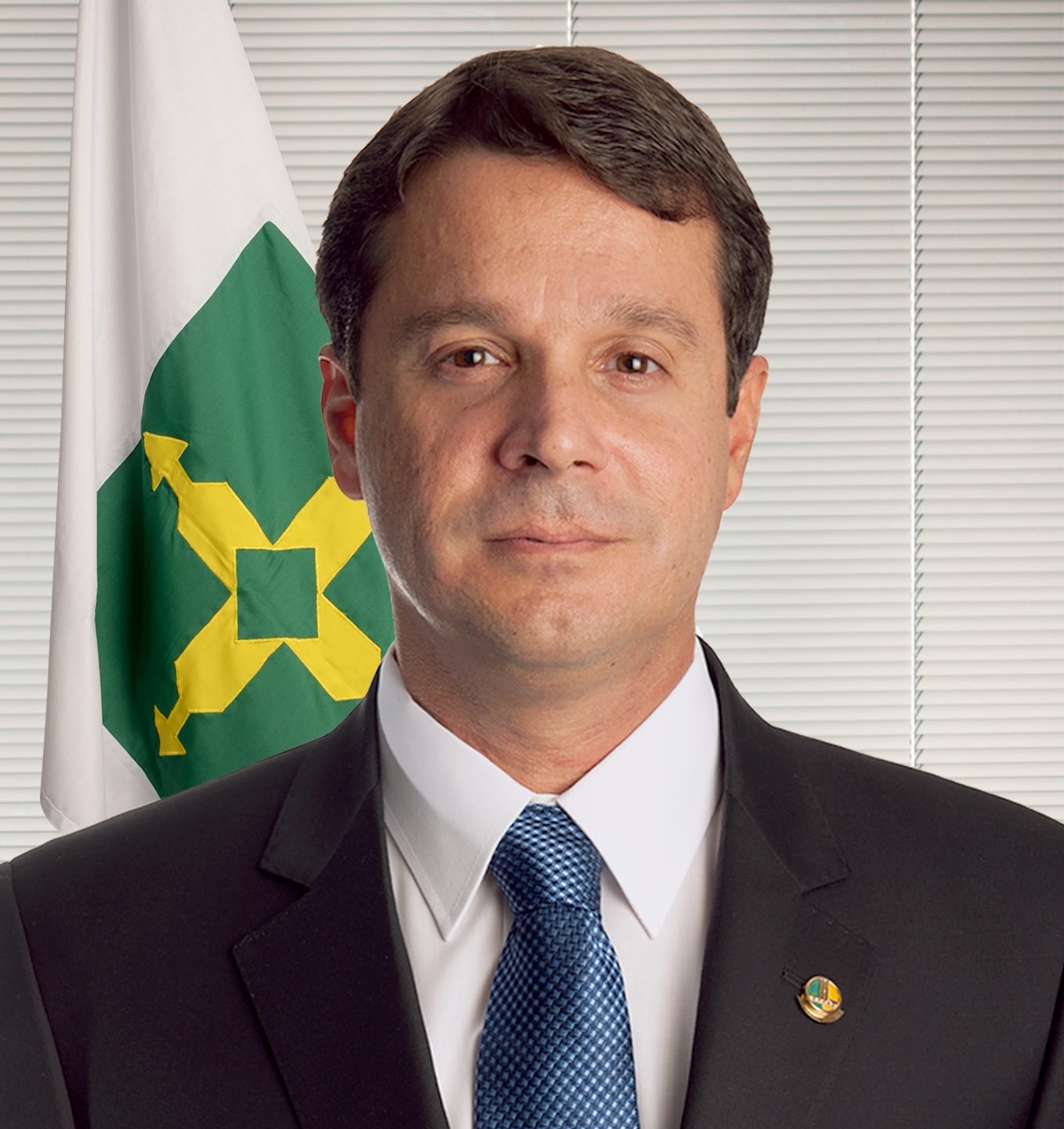

Senator for the Federal District
- In office 1 February 2015 – 1 February 2023

Member of the Chamber of Deputies
- In office 1 February 2011 – 1 February 2015
- Constituency: Federal District

Member of the Legislative Chamber of the Federal District
- In office 1 February 2007 – 1 February 2011
- Constituency: At-large

Personal details
- Born: José Antônio Machado Reguffe; 5 September 1972 (age 54) Rio de Janeiro, Brazil
- Party: Solidarity (2025–present)
- Other political affiliations: PDT (2005−2016); PODE (2019–2022); UNIÃO (2022)
- Education: Higher Education Institute of Brasilia (B.J.); University of Brasília (BEc)
- Profession: Journalist
- Awards: Peacemaker Medal (Note: Portuguese: Medalha do Pacificador)

José Antônio Machado Reguffe (born 5 September 1972), also known as Reguffe, is a Brazilian journalist, economist and politician. He represented the Federal District (Portuguese: Distrito Federal) in the Federal Senate from 2015 to 2023. Previously he was a federal deputy representing the Federal District from 2011 to 2015 and was a district deputy from 2007 to 2011. He was a member of Brazil Union (UNIÃO), but left the party after not being nominated as a candidate for the 2022 Federal District gubernatorial election. After the party decision, Reguffe decided to leave politics. He went to Solidarity party in February 2025 after being without a party for three years.
