= Wanderley Vallim =

Brazilian entrepreneur and politician (1936–2022)

Governor of the Federal District
- In office 9 March 1990 – 1 January 1991
- Preceded by: Joaquim Roriz
- Succeeded by: Joaquim Roriz

Personal details
- Born: Wanderley Vallim da Silva; 12 August 1936; Ituverava, Brazil
- Died: 9 July 2022 (aged 85); Brasília, Brazil
- Political party: PTB
- Education: Federal University of Rio de Janeiro
- Occupation: Entrepreneur

Wanderley Vallim da Silva (12 August 1936 – 9 July 2022) was a Brazilian entrepreneur and politician. A member of the Brazilian Labour Party, he served as governor of the Federal District from 1990 to 1991.

Vallim died in Brasília on 9 July 2022 at the age of 85.
