= Escola sem Partido =

Brazilian political movement

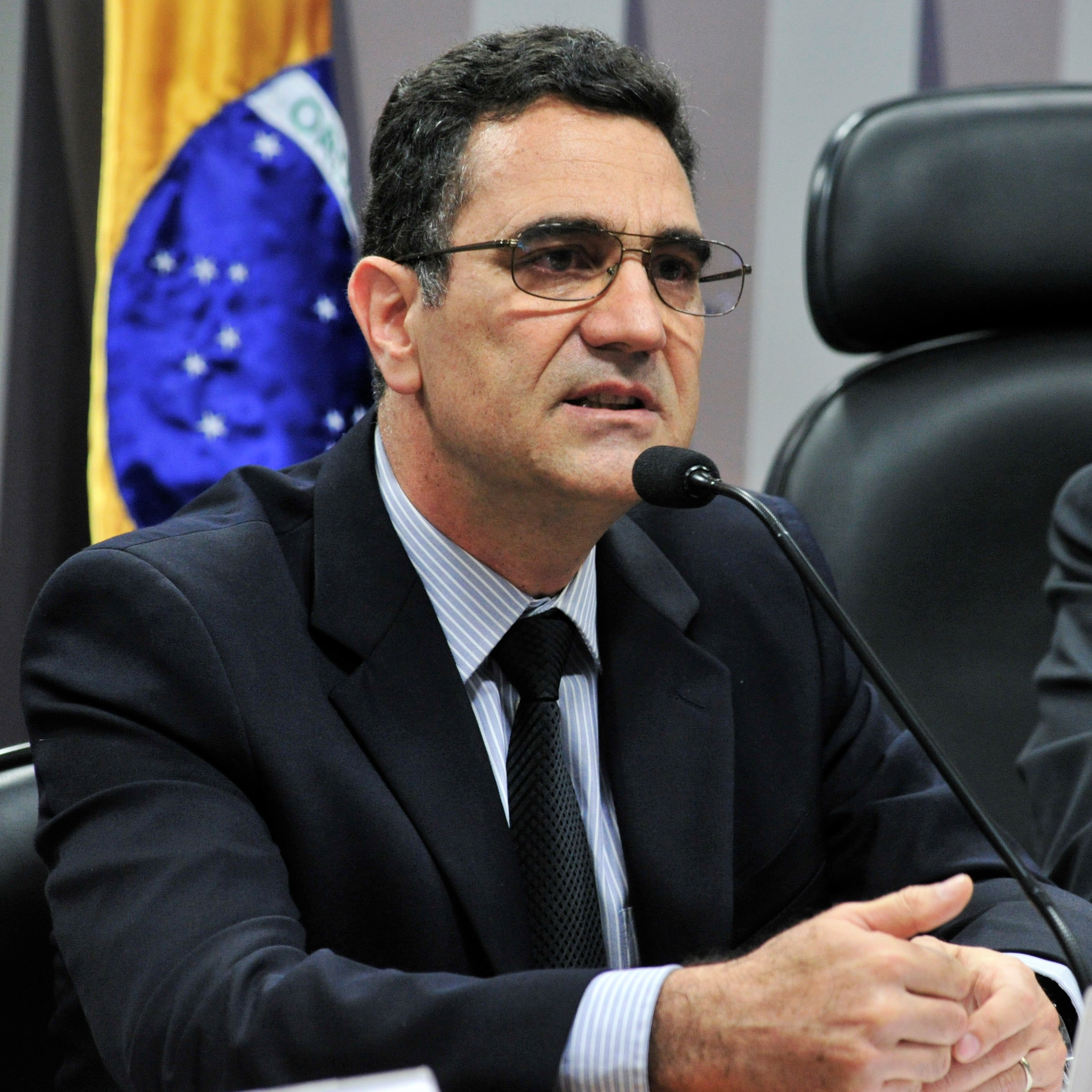
Miguel Nagib, creator of "Escola sem Partido"

Escola sem Partido (Portuguese for Nonpartisan School) is a political movement in Brazil aimed at curbing what its supporters perceive to be left-wing ideological indoctrination in schools and universities. It is articulated by far-right politicians, who defend the ultraliberal ideology and religious fundamentalism of neo-Pentecostal evangelicals and the Catholic Charismatic Renewal. It gained notoriety in 2015 when bills inspired by the movement began to be presented and debated in numerous municipal chambers and legislative assemblies across the country, as well as in the Brazilian National Congress.

The movement was created in 2004 by lawyer Miguel Nagib, who continued promoting it until 2019.

Nearly 60 bills were introduced nationwide under the influence of the movement. Analyzing these proposals and the documents made available by the campaign, the National Council for Human Rights issued a resolution repudiating all initiatives of the Escola sem Partido movement. The United Nations High Commissioner for Human Rights treated the bills promoted by the movement as threats to basic human rights. Several of these bills were challenged by the Federal Public Prosecutor's Office, the Advocacy General of the Union, and the Supreme Federal Court.

== History ==
The movement began in 2004, when attorney Miguel Nagib created a website where parents could post complaints of teachers and professors who were supposedly indoctrinating their children politically. Since then, there have been several proposals and bills introduced nationwide inspired by the "Escola sem Partido" concept, one of which was approved in the state of Alagoas in 2016. A federal bill, Bill no. 193, was introduced in 2016 by Senator Magno Malta.

== Repercussion ==
The movement has gained steam in 2018, with the election of Jair Bolsonaro as president. Bolsonaro is a supporter of "Escola sem Partido", as was his former Minister of Education, Ricardo Vélez Rodríguez. Other supporters of the project include the Free Brazil Movement (MBL), senator Flávio Bolsonaro and city councilman Fernando Holiday. State Representative Ana Caroline Campagnolo (PSL) became the target of an investigation after suggesting that students record videos of their classes and denounce "indoctrinating teachers."

Opponents of "Escola sem Partido" say that the movement's proposals would restrict freedom of speech in the classroom and would harm critical thinking. Federal deputy Erika Kokay suggested that a "Escola sem Partido" bill would turn teachers into "enemies of the nation".

Representatives from educational organizations in 87 countries signed a motion against censorship of teachers during the 6th World Assembly of the Global Campaign for Education, which took place between the 16th and 18th in Kathmandu, Nepal. The signing of the document was proposed by the Latin American Campaign for the Right to Education (CLADE), with support from organizations in Norway, Germany, and Angola, among others. The motion cites the Escola sem Partido movement as one that encourages censorship of teachers.
