= Joaquim Roriz =

Brazilian politician

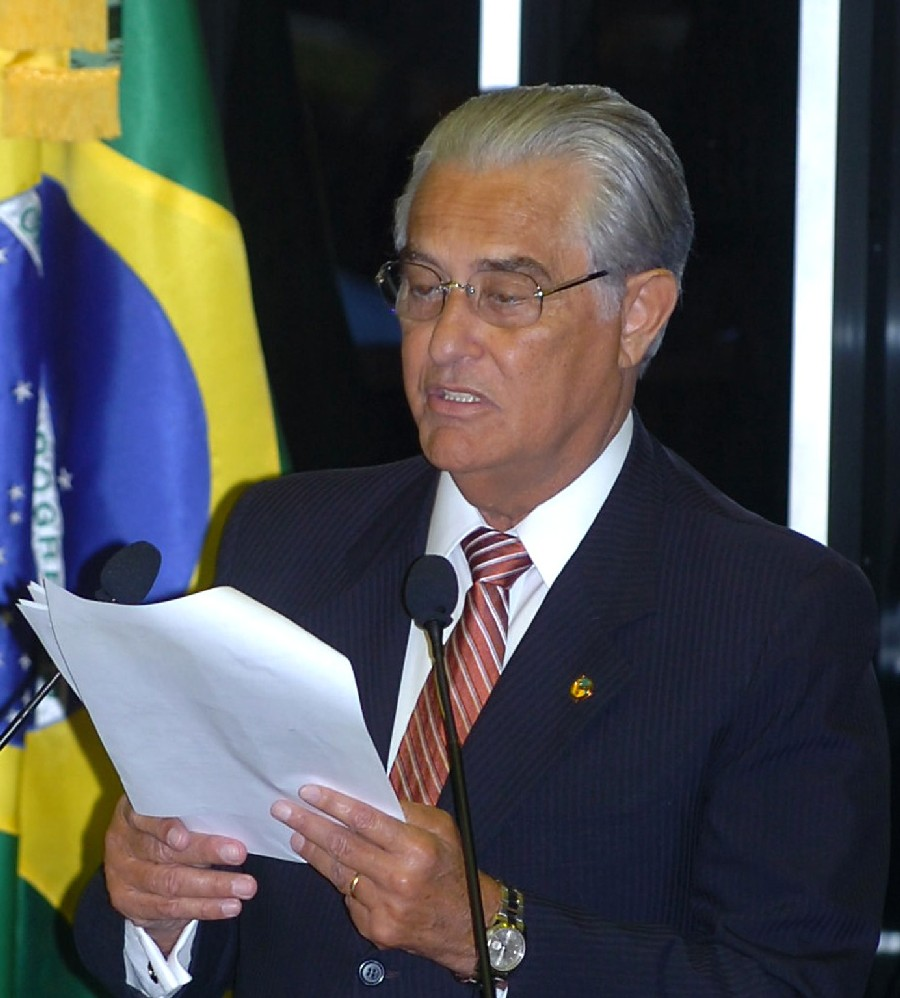

Member of the Federal Senate
- In office February 1, 2007 – July 1, 2007

Governor of the Federal District
- In office January 1, 1999 – March 31, 2006
- Preceded by: Cristovam Buarque
- Succeeded by: Maria de Lourdes Abadia

Governor of the Federal District
- In office March 15, 1991 – January 1, 1995
- Preceded by: Wanderley Vallim
- Succeeded by: Cristovam Buarque

Minister of Agriculture
- In office March 15, 1990 – March 29, 1990
- President: Fernando Collor de Mello
- Preceded by: Iris Rezende
- Succeeded by: Bernardo Cabral

Governor of the Federal District
- In office September 19, 1988 – March 9, 1990
- Preceded by: José Aparecido de Oliveira
- Succeeded by: Wanderley Vallim

Mayor of Goiânia
- In office December 6, 1987 – October 17, 1988
- Preceded by: Daniel Antônio de Oliveira
- Succeeded by: Daniel Antônio de Oliveira

Lieutenant Governor of Goiás
- In office January 4, 1986 – December 5, 1987
- Preceded by: Onofre Quinan
- Succeeded by: Maguito Vilela

Member of the Chamber of Deputies
- In office July 16, 1978 – January 4, 1986

Member of the Municipal Chamber of Luziânia
- In office April 19, 1971 – June 1, 1973

Personal details
- Born: 4 August 1936 Luziânia, Goiás, Brazil
- Died: September 27, 2018 (aged 82)
- Spouse: Weslian Roriz (1960–2018; his death)

Joaquim Roriz (4 August 1936 – 27 September 2018) was a Brazilian politician. He was the first elected governor of the Federal District, in 1990, and served three separate terms between 1991 and 2006. He had previously held the office as an appointee from the federal government between 1988 and 1990.
