= Bia Kicis =

Brazilian politician

- Kicis in 2024

Senator-elect for the Federal District
- Assuming office 1 February 2027

Member of the Chamber of Deputies
- Incumbent
- Assumed office 1 February 2019
- Constituency: Federal District

Personal details
- Born: Beatriz Kicis Torrents de Sordi; 19 September 1961 (age 65) Resende, Rio de Janeiro, Brazil
- Party: PL (since 2022)
- Other political affiliations: PRP (2018–2019); PSL (2019–2022); UNIÃO (2022)
- Occupation: Politician, lawyer and activist

Beatriz Kicis Torrents de Sordi (born 19 September 1961), better known as Bia Kicis, is a Brazilian politician, activist, YouTuber, lawyer, and former attorney general for Brazil's Federal District. A self-declared right-winger, she defends the use of verifiable paper records to prevent electoral fraud in the Brazilian electronic voting system. Kicis was elected federal deputy for the Brazilian Chamber of Deputies in the 2018 general election.

Kicis signed the Madrid Charter, a document drafted by the right-wing Spanish party Vox that describes left-wing groups as enemies of Ibero-America involved in a "criminal project" that are "under the umbrella of the Cuban regime".

== Early life and education ==
She was born on September 19, 1961, in Resende, Rio de Janeiro. She is the daughter of Rubeni Torrents Pereira, a retired military engineer, and Leda Pfeil Kicis Torrents Pereira, who held a degree in psychology. Kicis graduated in law from the University of Brasília.

== Personal life ==
Kicis is Roman Catholic and opposes abortion.

Chamber of Deputies (Brazil)
Preceded by Felipe Francischini	Chair of the Constitution, Justice and Citizenship Committee; 2021–2023	Succeeded by Rui Falcão
Preceded by Aureo Ribeiro	Chair of the Financial Oversight and Control Committee; 2023–present	Incumbent
Preceded by Eduardo Bolsonaro	Chamber Minority Leader; 2024–present	Incumbent
