= Cristovam Buarque =

Brazilian politician (born 1944)

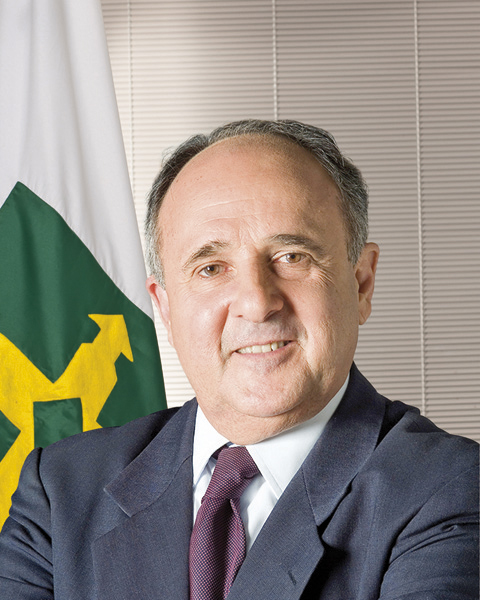

Senator for the Federal District
- In office February 1, 2003 – February 1, 2019
- Preceded by: Lauro Campos
- Succeeded by: Leila Barros

10th Governor of the Federal District
- In office January 1, 1995 – January 1, 1999
- Vice Governor: Arlete Sampaio
- Preceded by: Joaquim Roriz
- Succeeded by: Joaquim Roriz

Minister of Education
- In office January 1, 2003 – January 27, 2004
- President: Luiz Inácio Lula da Silva
- Preceded by: Paulo Renato Souza
- Succeeded by: Tarso Genro

Personal details
- Born: Cristovam Ricardo Cavalcanti Buarque; 20 February 1944 (age 82) Recife, PE, Brazil
- Party: CIDADANIA (2016–present); PDT (2005–2016); PT (1990–2005)
- Education: Federal University of Pernambuco (UFPE); Pantheon-Sorbonne University

Cristovam Ricardo Cavalcanti Buarque (Portuguese pronunciation: [kɾisˈtɔvɐ̃w buˈaʁki]; born February 20, 1944) is a Brazilian university professor and member of Cidadania. He was a senator for the Federal District from 2003 to 2019.

== Biography ==
Buarque graduated in mechanical engineering from the Federal University of Pernambuco in 1966. At that time he engaged in student politics becoming a militant of the Ação Popular, a group of the Leftist Progressive Church. After the 1964 coup, he was persecuted and exiled to France, where he earned a PhD in economics from the Pantheon-Sorbonne University, Paris, in 1973. He worked at Inter-American Development Bank (IDB) in Ecuador, Honduras, and the United States from 1973 to 1979. He was the first elected rector, by direct vote, of the University of Brasília in the wake of the military regime; governor of the Federal District; Minister of Education; and current senator, who was elected by a landslide vote. He worked as a consultant for several national and international bodies under the United Nations (UN) and presided over the University for Peace Council and participated in the Food Presidential Commission, which was formerly directed by late sociologist Herbert "Betinho" de Souza.

Buarque is a member of UNESCO's Institute of Education and of the Council of the United Nations University. He initiated the NGO Mission Child, which sponsors an income transfer program for thousands of families and is funded by private enterprises. He was awarded the Jabuti prize of Literature in 1995. He is a staunch defender of the "revolution… through education", a line of thought touted by Brazilian intellectuals like Anísio Teixeira, Darcy Ribeiro, and Paulo Freire.

Buarque proposes an alternative class analysis of modern capitalist societies. According to him, in modern capitalism, the increasing substitution of human labor by automated machines tends to make employed workers a privileged caste, while a new layer of "excluded" people—those who have no jobs, insurance, or health care—is formed. Buarque proposes intervention through government or institutional action on their behalf.

== Federal District Governor (1995–98) ==
His term as Governor of the Federal District was marked by strong tensions in the Workers' Party (PT), particularly in its unionist base. He managed to persuade the party to support his policies in return for demobilizing most of the PT activists.

The project Bolsa Escola, implemented in the Federal District during his term, now operates in Brazil and other countries. Despite gaining a 58% approval rating by the Datafolha institute, Buarque was narrowly defeated by Joaquim Roriz (PMDB) in the 1998 election. Buarque attributed his defeat to his opponent's promise to grant a large wage increase to the district's public servants—a promise which was not fulfilled.

== Entering PDT ==
In 2005, after the allegations of corruption involving the Worker's Party (PT), he left the party.

After considering staying in the Senate as an independent, he decided to enter the Democratic Labour Party (PDT) in 1989, with which he had longstanding connections. His proposal to transform education into a national priority is a continuation of the ideas of Darcy Ribeiro.

== See also ==
- List of governors of the Federal District

Political offices
Preceded by Paulo Renato Souza	Minister of Education; 2003–2004	Succeeded by Tarso Genro
Party political offices
Preceded by Ciro Gomes	Democratic Labour Party nominee for President of Brazil; 2006	Succeeded by Ciro Gomes
