= Izalci Lucas =

Brazilian politician

- Official portrait, 2019

Senator for the Federal District
- Incumbent
- Assumed office 1 February 2019

Member-elect of the Chamber of Deputies
- Assuming office 1 February 2027
- Constituency: Federal District
- In office 29 April 2008 – 1 February 2019
- Constituency: Federal District

Member of the Legislative Chamber of the Federal District
- In office 1 February 2003 – 1 February 2007
- Constituency: At-large

Personal details
- Born: Izalci Lucas Ferreira; 7 April 1956 (age 70) Araújos, Minas Gerais, Brazil
- Party: PL (2010–2014, 2024–present)
- Other political affiliations: PSDB (1998–2002, 2014–2024); DEM (2002–2010)

Izalci Lucas Ferreira (born 7 April 1956) is a federal senator of the Liberal Party representing the Federal District of Brazil. Born in Minas Gerais, he previously served as a federal deputy from 2008 to 2019.

== Personal life ==
Lucas was born in Araújos, to Antonio Ferreira Neto and Maria Ferreira de Melo. Before entering politics, Lucas worked as a business contractor. He is married to Ivone Fernandes and has três sons, Marcelo, Renato and Sérgio.

== Political career ==
Lucas voted in favor of the impeachment motion against then-president Dilma Rousseff. He voted against a corruption investigation into Rousseff's successor, Michel Temer. He voted in favor of the 2017 Brazilian labor reforms.

In the 2018 Brazilian general election, Lucas was elected to the federal senate with 399,297 votes.

During Operation Car Wash, Lucas was investigated on suspicion of financial fraud.
