= Ibaneis Rocha =

Brazilian politician and lawyer

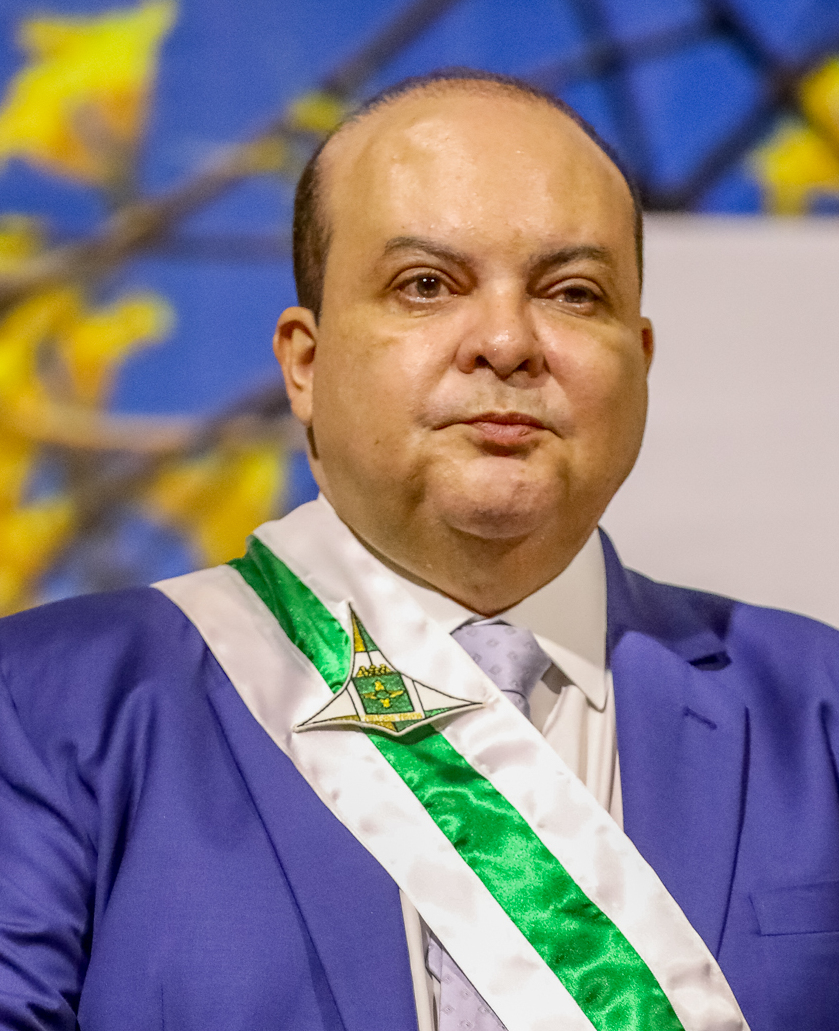
- Rocha in 2023

Governor of the Federal District
- In office 1 January 2019 – 30 March 2026; Suspended: 8 January 2023 – 15 March 2023
- Vice Governor: Paco Britto; Celina Leão (Note: Leão served as governor from 8 January 2023 to 15 March 2023 after Rocha was suspended by Alexandre de Moraes for inaction during the 2023 Praça dos Três Poderes attack.)
- Preceded by: Rodrigo Rollemberg
- Succeeded by: Celina Leão

Personal details
- Born: Ibaneis Rocha Barros Junior; 10 July 1971 (age 55) Brasília, Brazil
- Party: MDB (2017–present)
- Education: University Centre of Brasília (LL.B.); Mackenzie Presbyterian University
- Occupation: Lawyer

Ibaneis Rocha Barros Júnior (Brazilian Portuguese: [ibɐˈnejz ˈʁɔʃɐ ˈbaʁuz ˈʒuni.oʁ]; born 10 July 1971) is a Brazilian politician, lawyer and former Governor of the Federal District. He defeated incumbent governor Rodrigo Rollemberg (PSB) with 69% of the popular vote. A member of the Brazilian Democratic Movement (MDB), Rocha is the first Federal District native to serve as its governor.

On March 28, 2026, Rocha resigned from the governorship in order to run for the Federal Senate in the 2026 Brazilian general election. He formally vacated the post on March 30 and was succeeded by the Vice-Governor, Celina Leão.

== Suspension of duties ==
On 8 January 2023, Brazil Supreme Court Justice Alexandre de Moraes temporarily suspended Ibaneis for a period of 90 days from the position of governor after the 2023 invasion of the Brazilian Congress in the federal capital of Brazil for allegations of security flaws. The protests were led by a combination of individuals who support former president Jair Bolsonaro and oppose current president Luiz Inácio Lula da Silva. Vice-Governor Celina Leão temporarily took office until 15 March 2023, when Rocha's suspension was revoked by Moraes.

== Notes ==
Political offices
Preceded by Rodrigo Rollemberg	Governor of the Federal District; 2019–2026	Succeeded by Celina Leão
