= List of governors of the Federal District (Brazil) =

Governor of Federal District of Brazil
- Flag of the governor of the Federal District

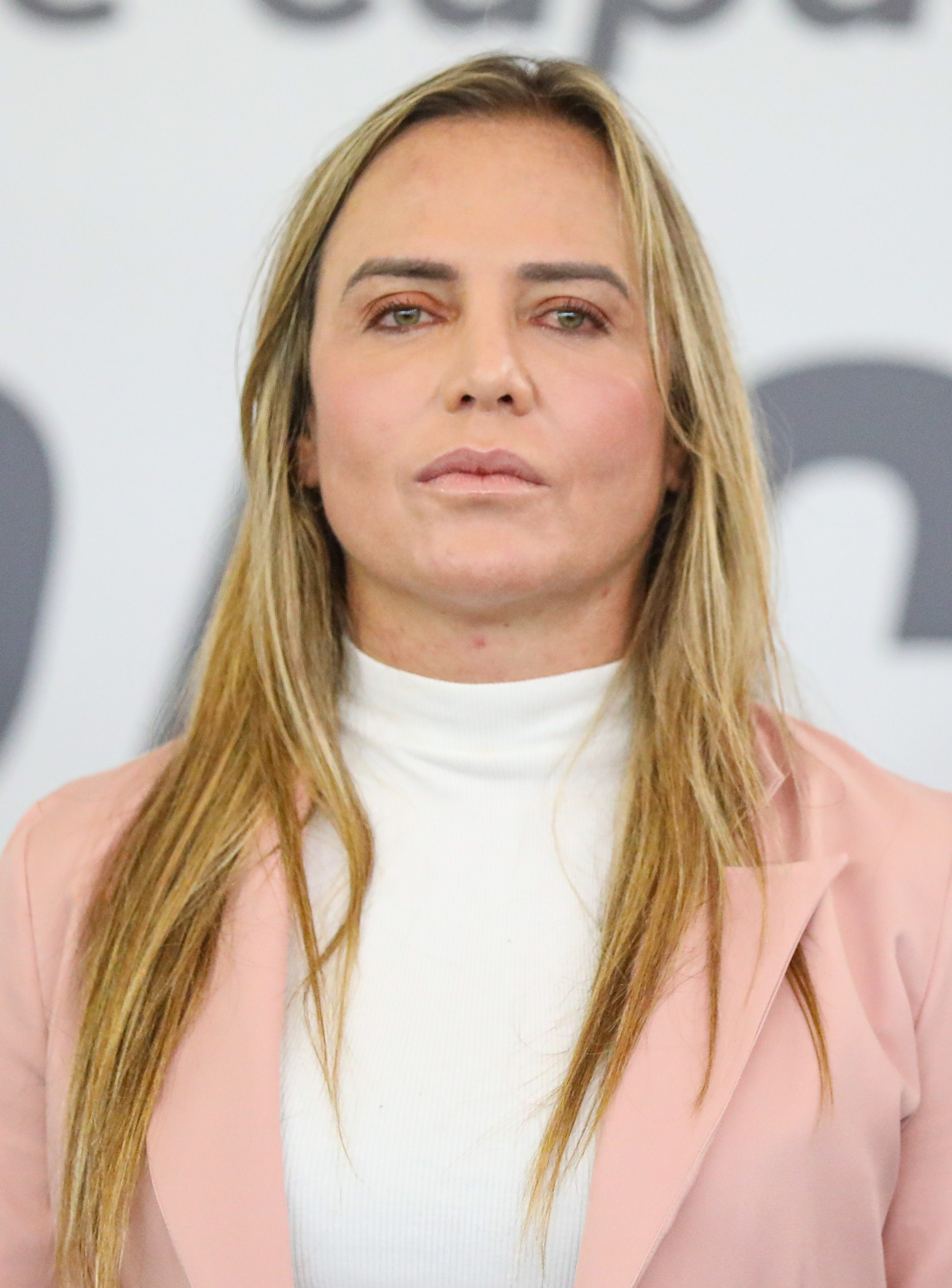
- Incumbent; Celina Leão since 30 March 2026
- Inaugural holder: Francisco Antônio Pessoa de Barros
- Formation: November 17, 1889
- Website: Governor of the Federal District

This is a list of governors of the Federal District, Brazil. The Federal District (Portuguese: Distrito Federal; Portuguese pronunciation: [dʒisˈtɾitu fedeˈɾaw]) is one of 27 federative units of Brazil. In its territory is located the federal capital, Brasília, in the interior of the country. Prior to 1960, the former Federal District in its territory had located the city of Rio de Janeiro; when the federal capital was relocated to Brasília, the former federal district became Guanabara State, which after 15 years of autonomy, was merged with Rio de Janeiro State in 1975.

== Governors of the Federal District (1960–present) ==
Governor	Date in office	Party
Celina Leão	2026–present	PP
Ibaneis Rocha	2019–2026	MDB
Rodrigo Rollemberg	2015–2019	PSB
Agnelo Queiroz	2011–2015	PT
Rogério Rosso	2010–2011	PMDB
Wilson Ferreira de Lima	2010	PR
Paulo Octávio	2010	DEM
José Roberto Arruda	2007–2010	PFL (later renamed DEM)
Maria de Lourdes Abadia	2006–2007	PSDB
Joaquim Roriz	1999–2006	PMDB
Cristovam Buarque	1995–1999	PT
Joaquim Roriz	1991–1995	PTR
Wanderley Vallim	1990–1991	PTB
Joaquim Roriz	1988–1990	
José Aparecido de Oliveira	1985–1988	
Ronaldo Costa Couto	1985	
José Ornellas de Souza Filho	1982–1985	
Aimé Alcebíades Silveira Lamaison	1979–1982	
Elmo Serejo Farias	1974–1979	
Hélio Prates da Silveira	1969–1974	
Wadjó da Costa Gomide	1967–1969	
Plínio Reis de Cantanhede Almeida	1964–1967	
Ivan de Souza Mendes	1964	
Ivo de Magalhães	1962–1964	
José Sette Câmara Filho	1961–1962	
Ângelo Dário Rizzi	1961	
Paulo de Tarso Santos	1961	
Bayard Lucas de Lima	1961	
Israel Pinheiro da Silva	1960–1961	

== Governors of the Federal District (1889–1960) ==
Governor	Date in office	Party
José J. de Sá Freire Alvim	1958–1960	
Francisco Negrão de Lima	1956–1958	PTB
Francisco de Sá Lessa	1955–1956	
Eitel de Oliveira Lima	1955	
Alim Pedro	1954–1955	
Dulcídio Cardoso	1952–1954	
João Carlos Vital	1951–1952	
Ângelo Mendes de Morais	1947–1951	
Hildebrando de Araújo Góis	1946–1947	
Filadelfo de Barros Azevedo	1945–1946	
Henrique de Toledo Dodsworth	1937–1945	
Olímpio de Melo	1936–1937	
Pedro Ernesto Batista	1935–1936	
Carlos César de Oliveira Sampaio	1920–1922	
Paulo de Frontin	1919	
