= Legislative Chamber of the Federal District =

Legislative branch in Brazil

Legislative Chamber of Federal District Câmara Legislativa do Distrito Federal
- 9th Legislature of the Legislative Chamber

Type
- Type: Unicameral
- Term limits: None

History
- Founded: 1 January 1991

Leadership
- President: Wellington Luiz, MDB since 1 January 2023
- Government Leader: João Hermeto de Oliveira, MDB
- Majority Leader: Rogério Morro da Cruz, PRD
- Minority Leader: Gabriel Magno, PT

Structure
- Seats: 24 deputies
- Political groups: MDB (5) PL (3) PT (3) PP (2) PSD (2) PSOL (2) Republicans (2) Avante (1) PRD (1) PSB (1) PSDB (1) UNIÃO (1)

Elections
- Voting system: Open list proportional representation
- Last election: 2 October 2022
- Next election: 2026

Meeting place
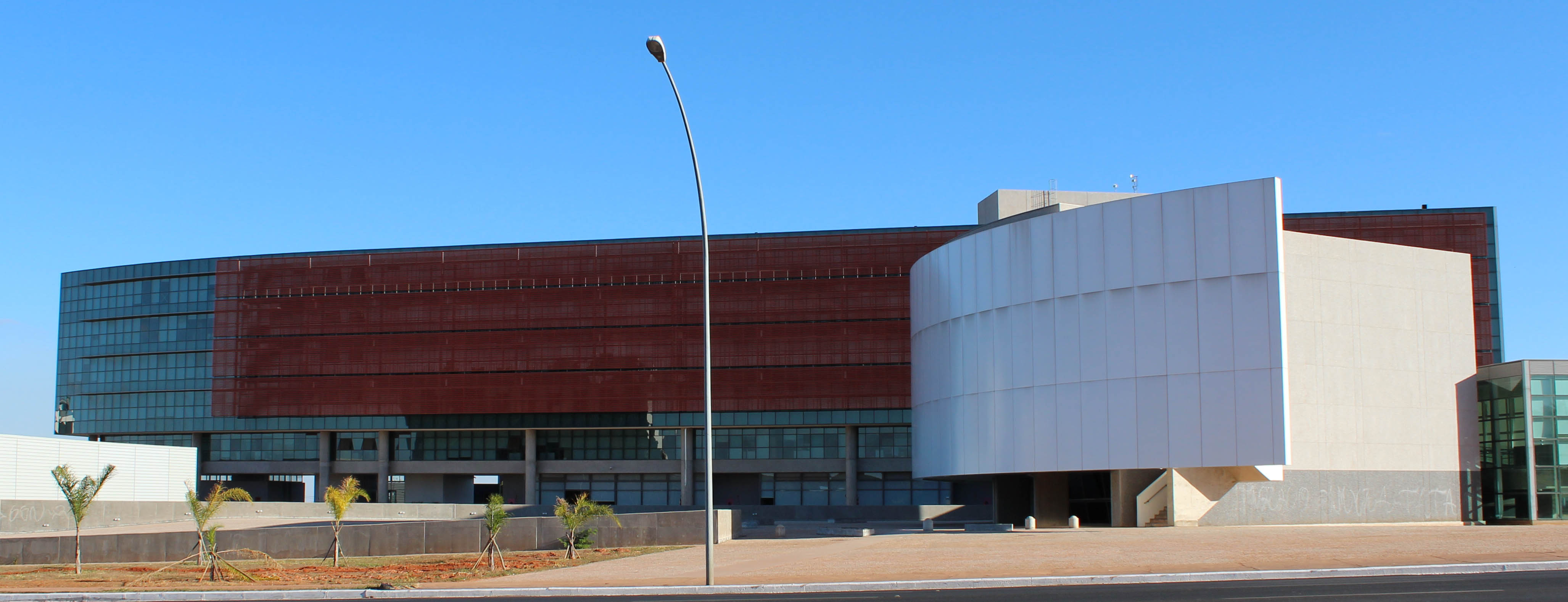
- Legislative Chamber Building; Brasília, Federal District

Website
- www.cl.df.gov.br

The Legislative Chamber of Federal District (Portuguese: Câmara Legislativa do Distrito Federal) is the unicameral legislative branch of Federal District in Brazil. The legislative chamber is composed by 24 district deputies (Portuguese: deputados distritais), which corresponds to three times the number of federal deputies that represent the voters of the Federal District.

The Constitution of 1967 gave to the Federal Senate the legislative branch of the Federal District, after the Constitution of 1988, the Legislative Chamber was created, The first legislature began on January 1, 1991. It accumulates legislative powers of state and municipality at the same time.
