= Recife =

Capital of Pernambuco, Brazil

- Municipality
- Municipality of Recife
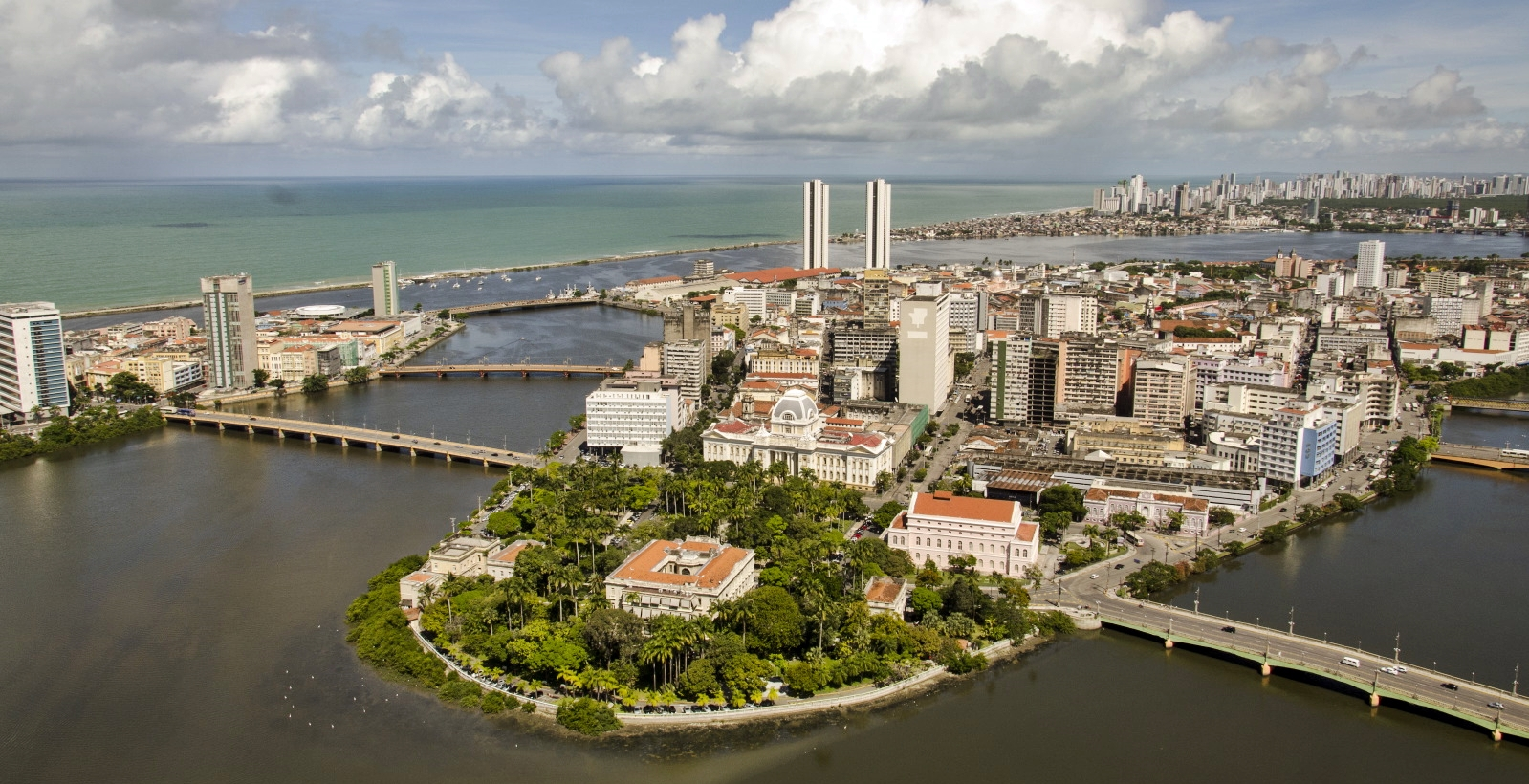
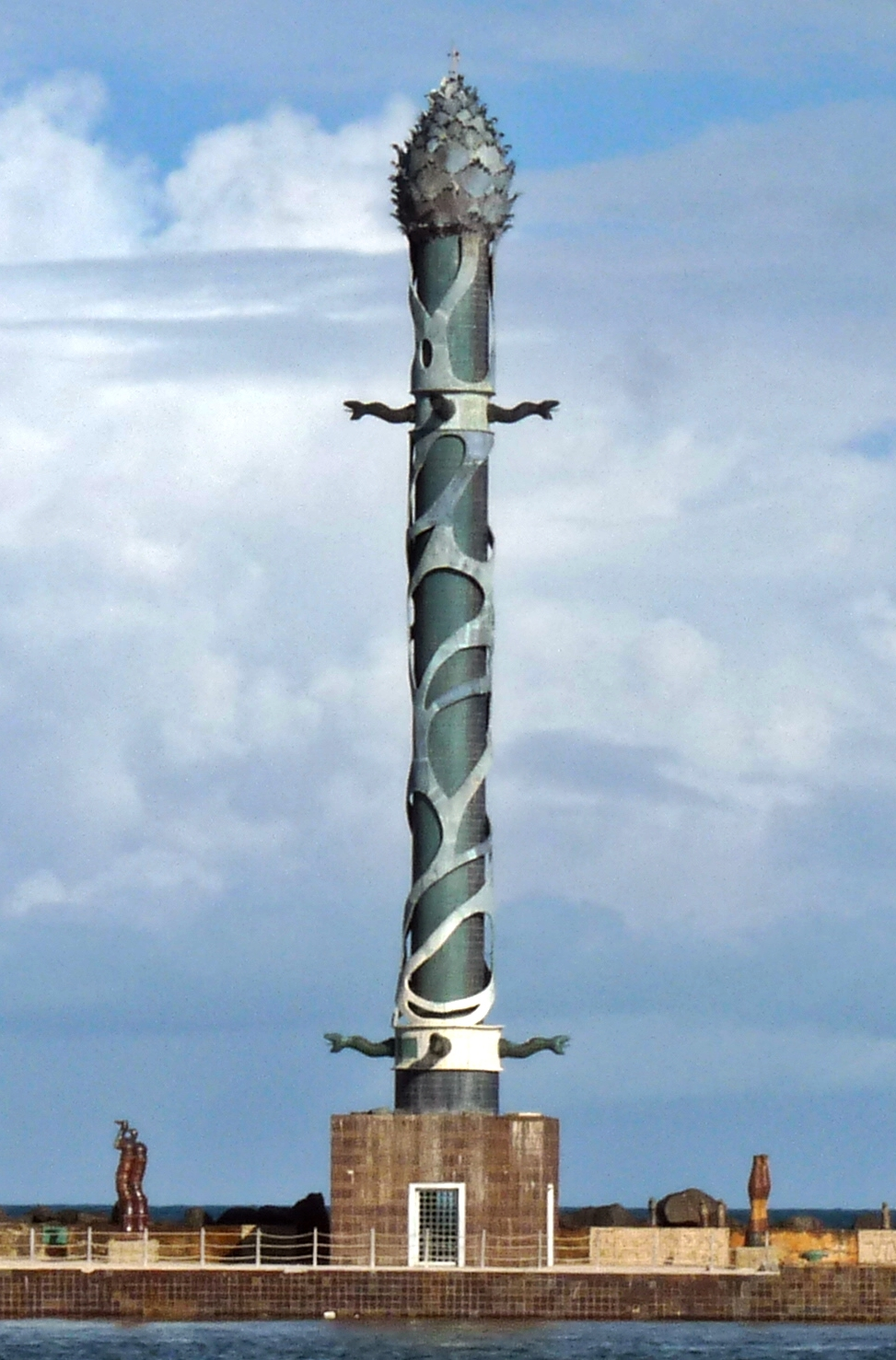
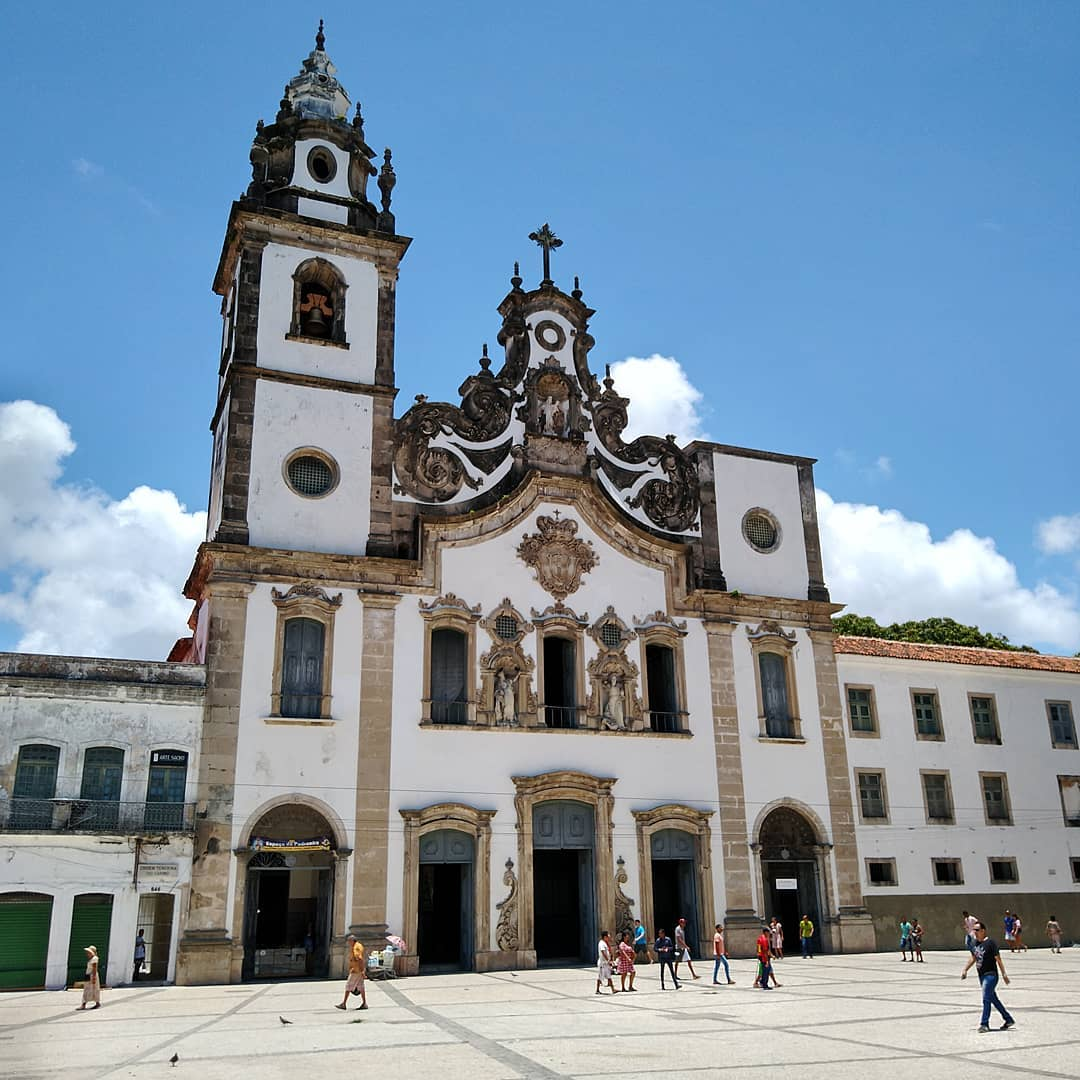
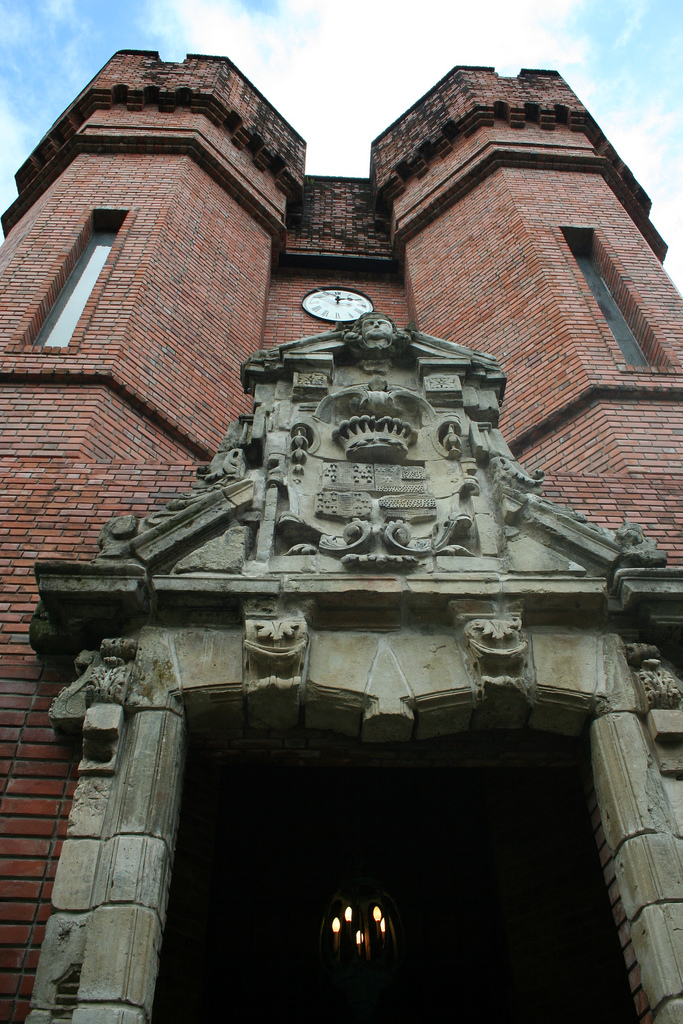
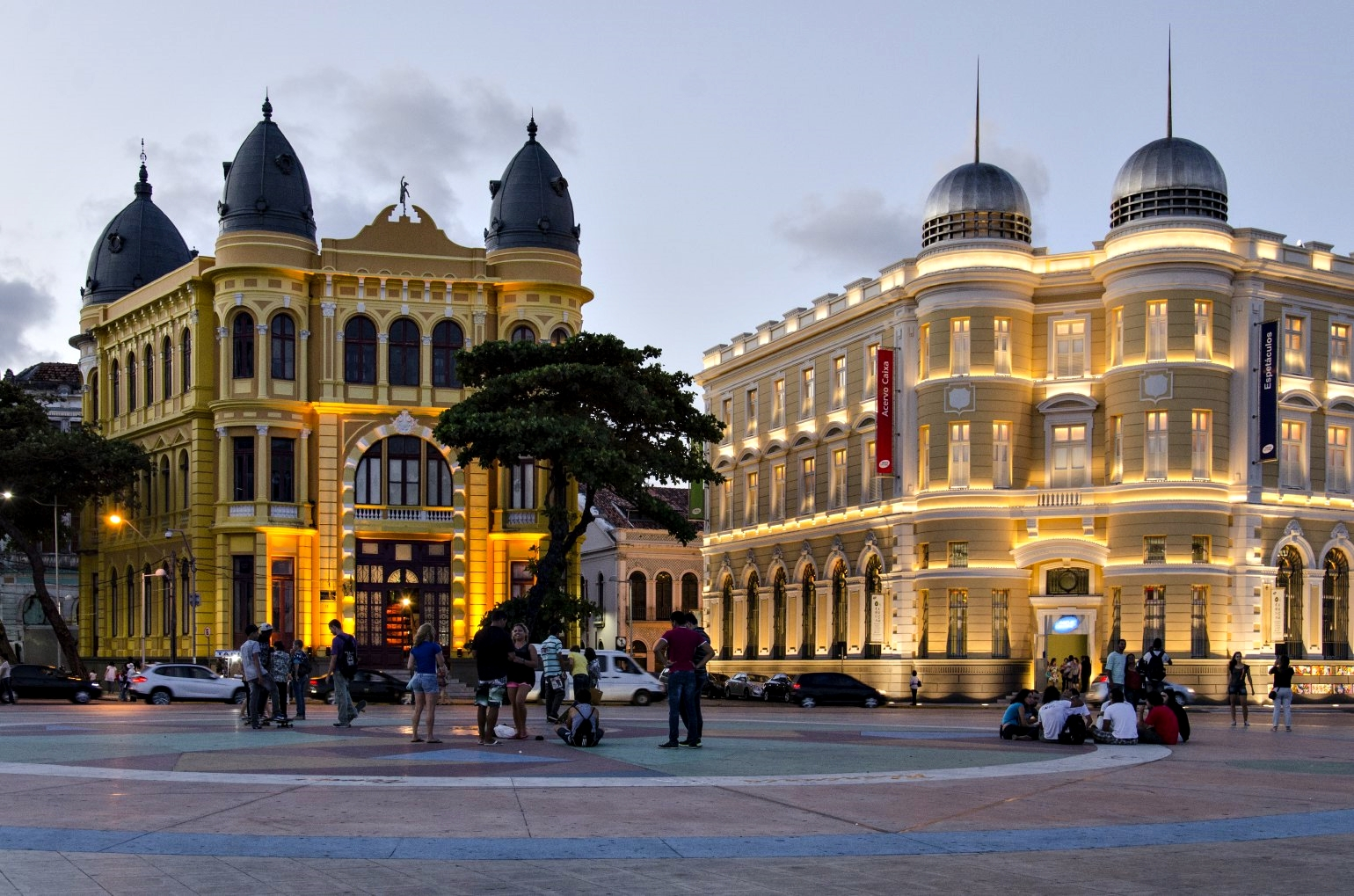
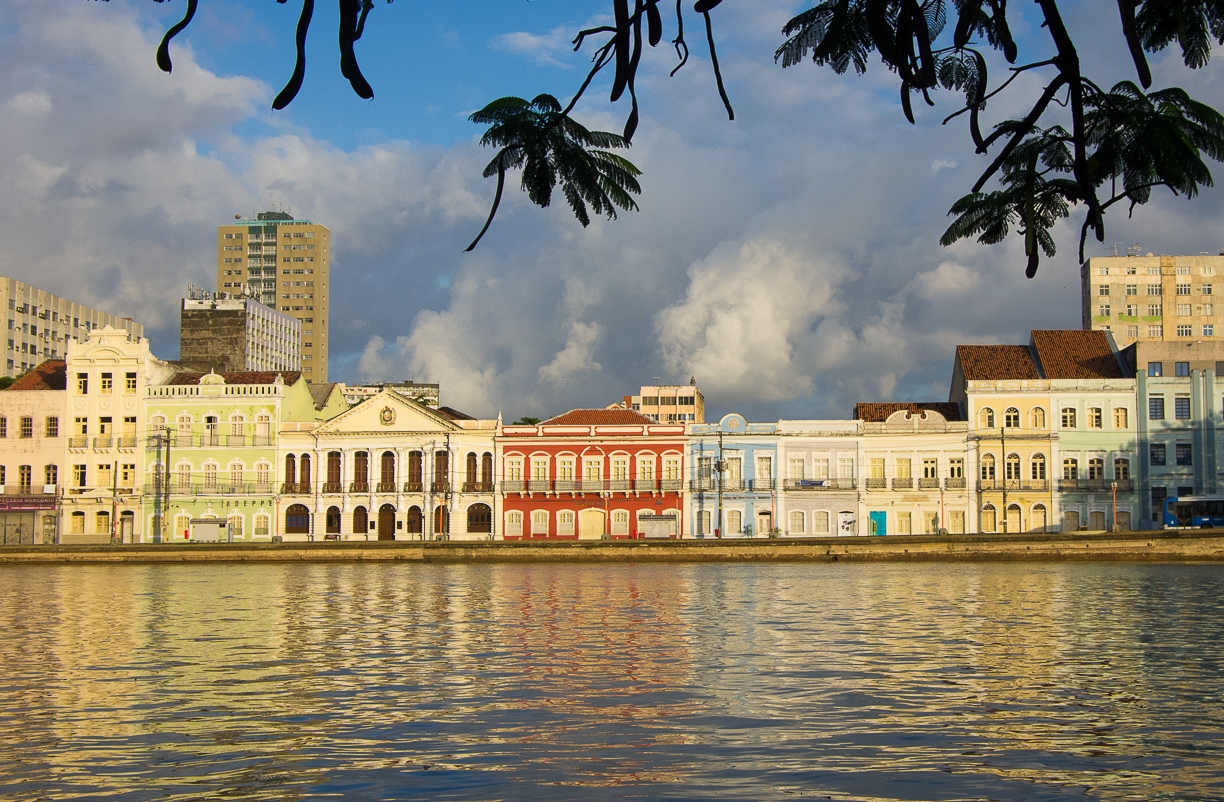
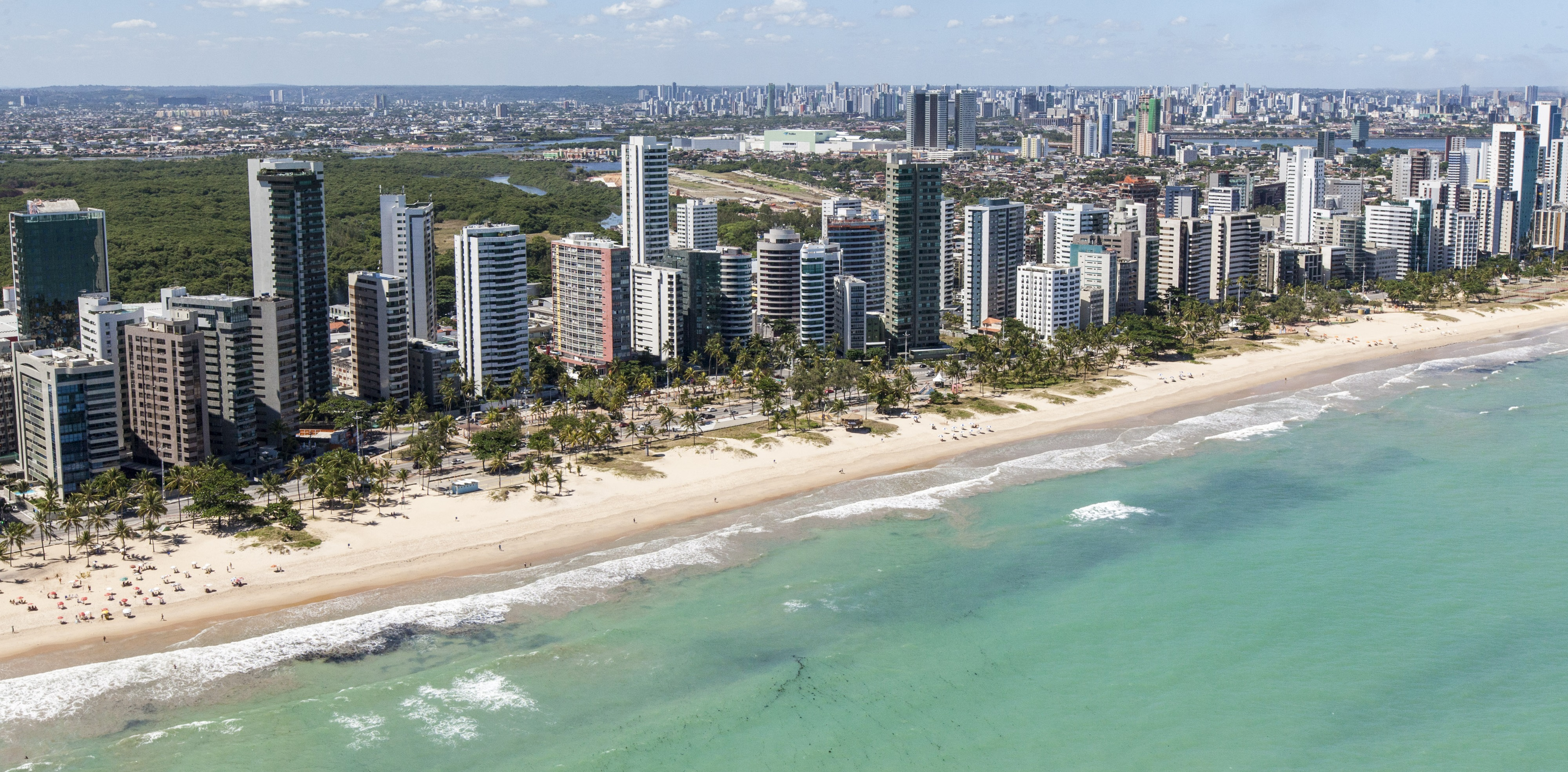
- Aerial of Antonio Vaz Island Crystal Tower Basilica of Recife Brennand Castle Rio Branco Square Aurora Street Boa Viagem

- Flag Coat of arms
- Nicknames: Veneza Brasileira (Brazilian Venice), Capital of the Northeast and Mauricéia/Mauritsstad (after the Dutch colonisation)
- Motto: Latin: Ut Luceat Omnibus; That it may shine on all (Matthew 5:15)
- Interactive map of Recife
- Location within Brazil Location within South America
- Coordinates: 8°3′S 34°54′W
- Country: Brazil
- Region: Northeast
- State: Pernambuco
- Founded: 12 March 1537 (489 years ago)
- Incorporated (as village): 1709 (317 years ago)
- Incorporated (as city): 1823 (203 years ago)

Government
  - Mayor: Victor Marques (PCdoB)
  - Vice Mayor: Isabella de Roldão (PT)

Area
  - Municipality: 218 km^{2} (84 sq mi)
  - Metro: 2,768 km^{2} (1,069 sq mi)
- Elevation: 10 m (33 ft)

Population (2025)
  - Municipality: 1,588,376 (9th)
  - Density: 6,803.6/km^{2} (17,621/sq mi)
  - Metro: 4,305,000 (6th)
  - Metro density: 1,352.5/km^{2} (3,503/sq mi)
- Demonym: Recifense

GDP (PPP, constant 2015 values)
  - Year: 2023
  - Total (Metro): $47.2 billion
  - Per capita: $11,300
- Time zone: UTC-03:00 (BRT)
- Postal code: 50000-001 to 52999-999
- Area code: +55 81
- HDI (2010): 0.772 – high
- Website: www.recife.pe.gov.br (in Portuguese)

Recife (/rɪˈsiːfi, -fə/ riss-EE-fee, -fə; Brazilian Portuguese: [ʁeˈsifi]) is the state capital of Pernambuco, Brazil, on the northeastern Atlantic coast of South America. It is the largest urban area in both the North and the Northeast Region of Brazil. It is the largest city in Pernambuco state, and the fourth-largest urban area in all of Brazil; the metro population of the city of Recife was 3,726,974 in 2022. Recife was founded in 1537, serving as the main harbor of the Captaincy of Pernambuco—known for its large-scale production of sugar cane. At one point, it was known as Mauritsstad, when it served as the capital city of the 17th century colony of New Holland of Dutch Brazil (founded by the Dutch West India Company). Situated at the confluence of the Beberibe and Capibaribe rivers, before they drain into the South Atlantic Ocean, Recife is a major seaport along the Brazilian Atlantic coast. Its name is an allusion to the stone reefs that are present offshore. Together with the urban presence of the Beberibe and Capibaribe rivers and their tributaries, the many additional unique, small islands—and more than 50 bridges linking them throughout the city—create a distinct maritime or "riviera" atmosphere, leading to Recife being known as the "Venice of Brazil".

As of 2010, Recife has maintained the highest HDI of any state capital in Northeastern Brazil, and the second-highest of the entire Northern and Northeastern regions (second only to Palmas). However, the city also is known as having some of the highest rates of gun violence in the entire country, despite also being considered the "safest state capital" in the Northeast. Although Recife often has a consistently higher crime rate than Brazil's South Region, it typically has a much lower crime rate than other regional capitals—such as Salvador or São Luís. Nonetheless, crime rose nearly 440% in 2015. The waters along the coastline are also considered to be among the most dangerous "on earth", as there have been many recorded shark attacks on swimmers at the beaches, including fatal incidents.

The Metropolitan Region of Recife is the main industrial zone of the State of Pernambuco, major products are those derived from cane (sugar and ethanol), motor vehicles, ships, oil platforms, electronics, software, and others. With fiscal incentives by the government, many industrial companies were started in the 1970s and 1980s. Recife has a tradition of being the most important commercial hub of the North/Northeastern region of Brazil, with more than 52,500 business enterprises in Recife plus 32,500 in the Metro Area, totaling more than 85,000.

A combination of a large supply of labor and significant private investments turned Recife into Brazil's second largest medical hub (the first being São Paulo); modern hospitals with state-of-the-art equipment receive patients from several neighbouring States.

Recife stands out as a major tourist site within the Brazilian Northeast, known for the city itself, its beaches and for its historical sites, with many places of significance dating back to both the Portuguese and the Dutch colonies in the region. The beach of Porto de Galinhas, located 60 kilometers (37 mi) south of the city, has been repeatedly awarded the title of best beach in Brazil and has drawn many tourists. The Historic Centre of Olinda, 7 kilometers (4.3 mi) north of the city, was declared a UNESCO World Heritage Site in 1982, and both cities' Brazilian Carnival are among the world's most famous. According to The Herald, Recife has the biggest consumption of whisky around the world.

The city is an education hub, and home to the Federal University of Pernambuco, the largest university in Pernambuco. Several Brazilian historical figures, such as the poet and abolitionist Castro Alves, moved to Recife for their studies. Recife and Natal are the only Brazilian cities with direct flights to the islands of Fernando de Noronha, a World Heritage Site.

Recife was one of the host cities of the 2014 FIFA World Cup, and previously hosted the 2013 FIFA Confederations Cup and the 1950 FIFA World Cup.

== History ==
Historical Affiliations

Portuguese Empire 1537–1630
Dutch West India Company 1630–1654
Portuguese Empire 1654–1815
United Kingdom of Portugal, Brazil and the Algarves 1815–1822
Empire of Brazil 1822–1889
Republic of Brazil 1889–present

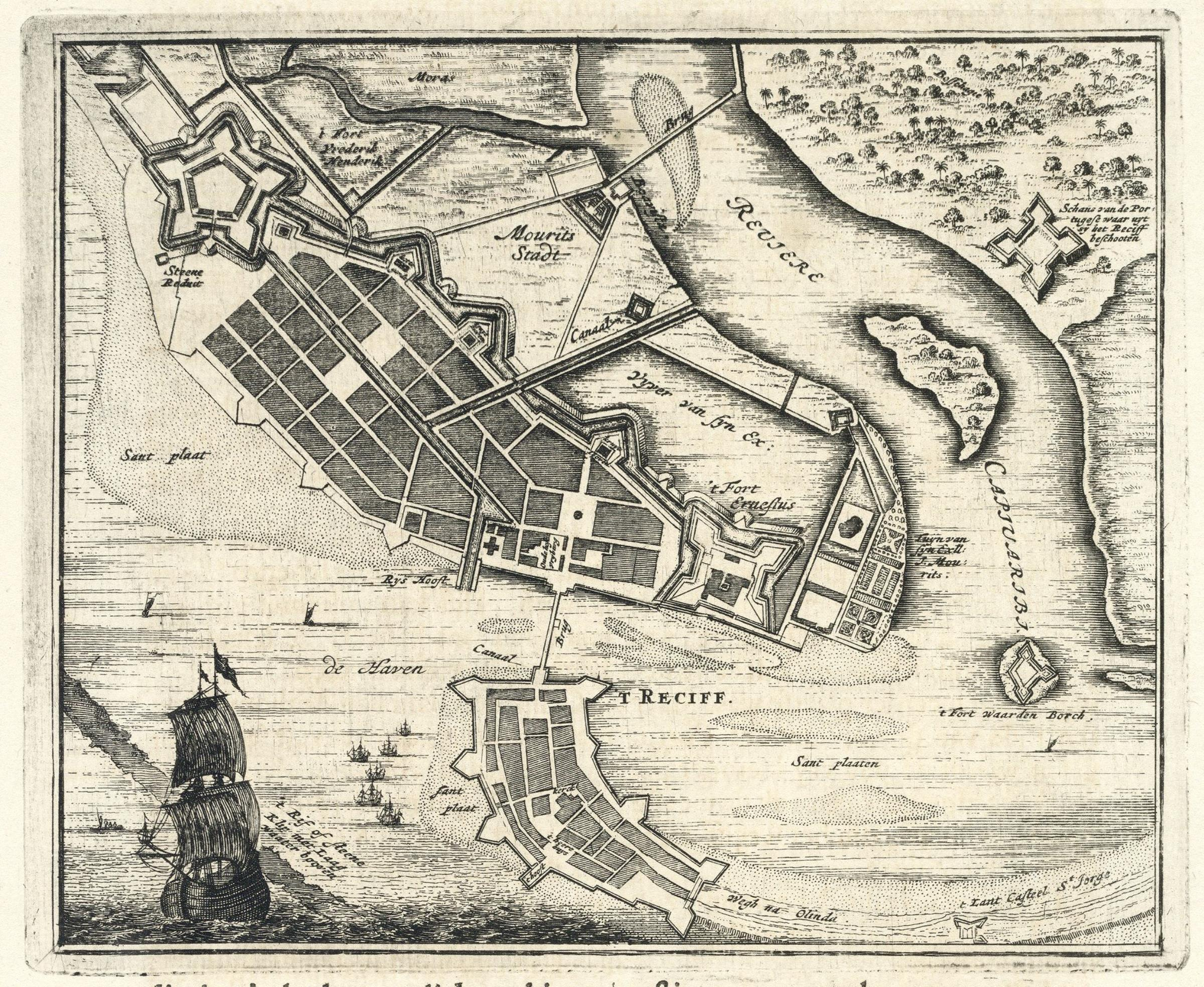
Map of Recife and Mauritsstad, ca. 1682, Weduwe van Jacob van Meurs (publisher)

Recife began as a collection of fishing shacks, inns and warehouses on the delta between the Capibaribe and Beberibe Rivers in the captaincy of Pernambuco, sometime between 1535 and 1537 in the earliest days of Portuguese colonisation of Terra de Santa Cruz, later called Brazil, on the northeast coast of South America. It was a settlement of colonial fishermen and way station for Portuguese sailors and passing ships.

The first documented reference to the settlement with its "arrecife dos navios" (reef of the ships) was in the royal Charter Act of March 12, 1537, establishing Olinda, 6 kilometres (3.7 miles) to the north, as a village, with its port where the Beberibe River meets the sea. Olinda (and Igarassu before it) had been settled in 1536 by Captain General Duarte Coelho, a Portuguese nobleman, proprietor and administrator of the captaincy of Pernambuco.

The city is named for the long reef recife running parallel to the shoreline which encloses its harbour. The reef is not as sometimes stated, a coral reef, but a consolidated ancient beach, now as firm and hard as stone.

In 1541, Coelho returned from the Kingdom of Portugal with the machinery for an engenho (sugar mill), and with it, his brother-in-law established the first mill named Nossa Senhora da Ajuda (Our Lady of Help), in the floodplain of the Beberibe River at Recife. At that time the banks of the Capibaribe River were covered by sugar cane.

Recife was capital of the 17th century New Holland (Dutch Brazil) established by the Dutch West India Company and was called Mauritsstad. The city was eventually recaptured by the Portuguese in 1654, following their victories at the first and second Battle of Guararapes.

The Mascate War of 1710–1711 pitted merchants of Recife against those of nearby Olinda.

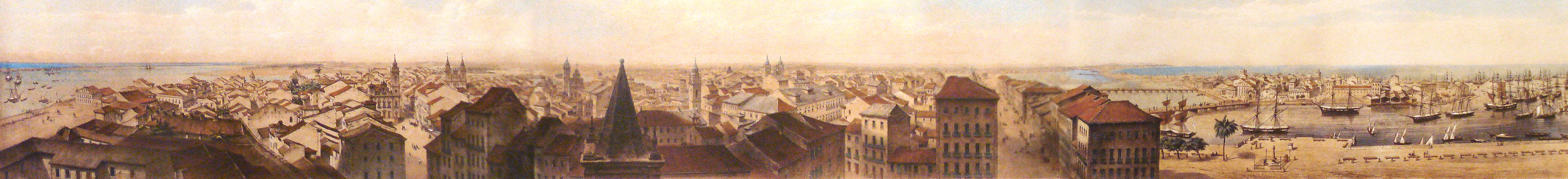
Panorama of Recife in 1855 by Friedrich Hagedorn.

== Geography ==
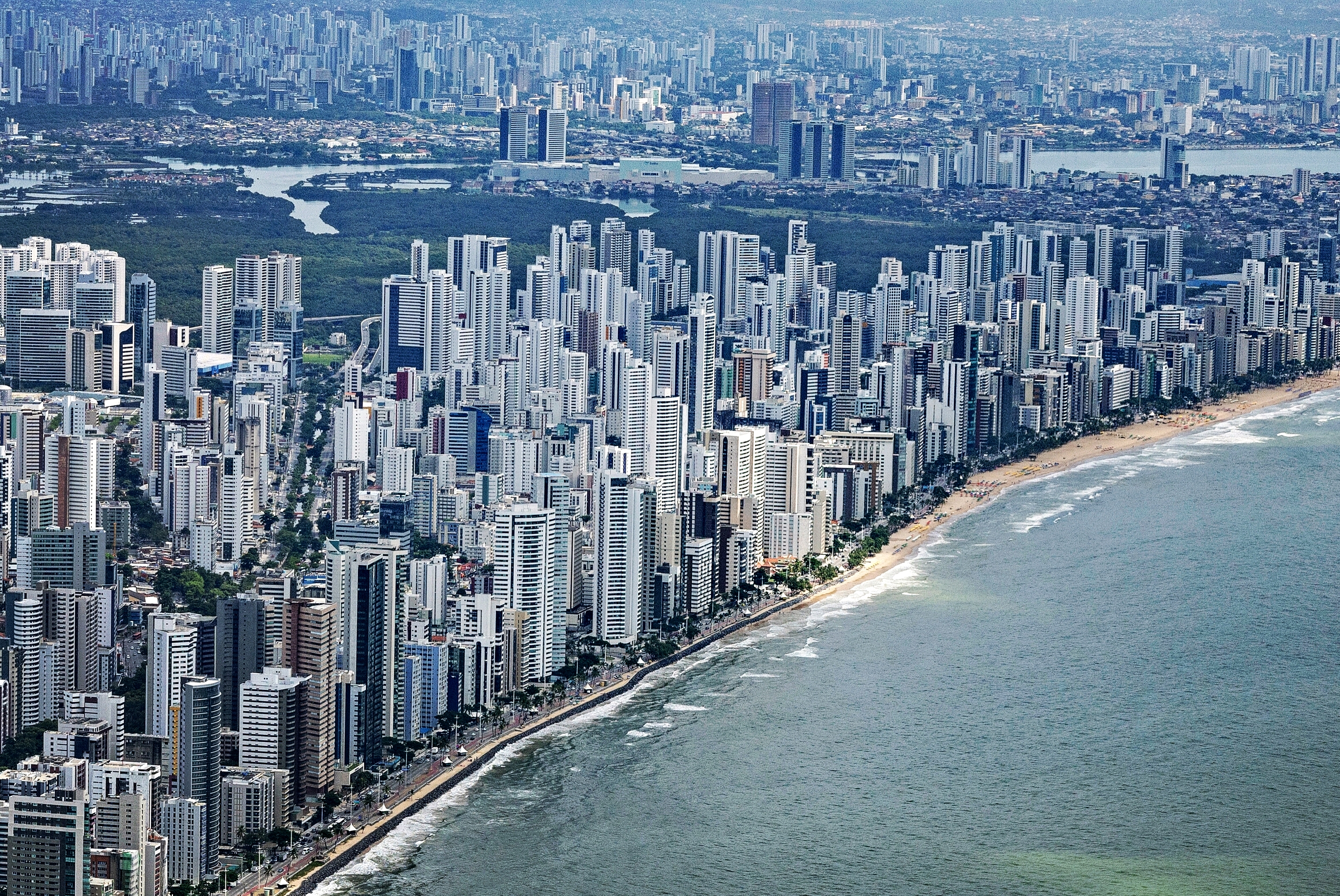
Recife has one of the greatest rainfall averages in Brazil.

Location on a map of municipalities of the state of Pernambuco

It has often been called "The Venice of Brazil".

Recife has a tropical forest. Rainforests are characterised by high rainfall, with definitions setting minimum normal annual rainfall between 2,000 millimetres (79 in) and 1,700 millimetres (67 in). The soil can be poor because high rainfall tends to leach out soluble nutrients. There are several common characteristics of tropical rainforest trees.

The city of Recife is formed by three islands (Recife, Santo Antônio, and Boa Vista). Between the islands are the rivers Beberibe and Capibaribe. Other rivers are the Jiquiá, Tejipió, Jordão and Pina.

=== Climate ===
Recife has a tropical monsoon climate (Am) under the Köppen climate classification, with warm to hot temperatures and high relative humidity throughout the year. However, these conditions are relieved by pleasant westwardly trade winds blowing in from the ocean. January and February are the warmest months, with mean temperatures ranging from 31 °C (88 °F) to 22 °C (72 °F), with sun. July is the second cloudiest month and experiences the coolest temperatures, with mean temperatures ranging from 28 °C (82 °F) to 21 °C (70 °F). The wettest month is June, receiving an average of 390 mm (15.4 in) of rain. Recife features a short dry season which lasts from October to December. The driest and sunniest month is November, when maximum temperatures hover around 30 °C (86 °F) and an average of 39 mm (1.5 in) of rain is recorded.

Climate data for Recife (1991–2020, extremes 1961–2021)
Month	Jan	Feb	Mar	Apr	May	Jun	Jul	Aug	Sep	Oct	Nov	Dec	Year
Record high °C (°F)	34.7 (94.5)	34.3 (93.7)	35.1 (95.2)	33.5 (92.3)	33.2 (91.8)	31.9 (89.4)	33.1 (91.6)	32.2 (90.0)	32.7 (90.9)	33.2 (91.8)	33.2 (91.8)	34.5 (94.1)	35.1 (95.2)
Mean daily maximum °C (°F)	30.8 (87.4)	31.0 (87.8)	30.9 (87.6)	30.4 (86.7)	29.6 (85.3)	28.5 (83.3)	27.9 (82.2)	27.9 (82.2)	28.6 (83.5)	29.6 (85.3)	30.4 (86.7)	30.8 (87.4)	29.7 (85.5)
Daily mean °C (°F)	27.1 (80.8)	27.3 (81.1)	27.2 (81.0)	26.6 (79.9)	25.8 (78.4)	24.8 (76.6)	24.2 (75.6)	24.2 (75.6)	25.2 (77.4)	26.1 (79.0)	26.7 (80.1)	27.1 (80.8)	26.0 (78.8)
Mean daily minimum °C (°F)	23.1 (73.6)	23.3 (73.9)	23.2 (73.8)	22.8 (73.0)	22.3 (72.1)	21.5 (70.7)	21.0 (69.8)	20.7 (69.3)	21.5 (70.7)	22.4 (72.3)	22.8 (73.0)	23.0 (73.4)	22.3 (72.1)
Record low °C (°F)	16.8 (62.2)	17.8 (64.0)	17.9 (64.2)	17.1 (62.8)	16.9 (62.4)	17.1 (62.8)	16.0 (60.8)	15.0 (59.0)	15.0 (59.0)	16.0 (60.8)	16.7 (62.1)	16.4 (61.5)	15.0 (59.0)
Average precipitation mm (inches)	106.6 (4.20)	127.0 (5.00)	197.2 (7.76)	268.9 (10.59)	317.1 (12.48)	390.5 (15.37)	314.8 (12.39)	186.7 (7.35)	93.3 (3.67)	52.8 (2.08)	39.0 (1.54)	61.6 (2.43)	2,155.5 (84.86)
Average precipitation days	11	11	15	17	19	22	23	19	12	9	7	8	173
Average relative humidity (%)	73.5	74.3	76.3	80.1	83.1	84.6	83.9	81.0	77.0	73.7	71.8	71.9	77.6
Mean monthly sunshine hours	222.5	204.4	220.2	203.6	189.3	164.5	173.6	195.5	207.7	233.2	243.2	244.6	2,502.3
Source: Instituto Nacional de Meteorologia

== Demographics ==
=== Population ===
The Recife metropolitan area is the 5th most populous of Brazil, after São Paulo, Rio de Janeiro, Belo Horizonte and Porto Alegre, and the first in the Northeast region. The most populous neighborhoods of Recife in 2008 were Boa Viagem (100,388), Casa Amarela (69,134), and Várzea (64,512).

Race and ethnicity in Recife
Ethnicity	Percentage
Pardo (Multiracial)	48.5%
White	38.8%
Black	12.3%
Asian	0.2%
Amerindian	0.2%

According to the 2022 census, there were 1,488,920 people residing in the city of Recife. The census revealed the following numbers: 722,555 Pardo (Multiracial) people (48.5%), 578,413 White people (38.8%), 182,546 Black people (12.3%), 2,703 Asian people (0.2%), 2,656 Amerindian people (0.2%).

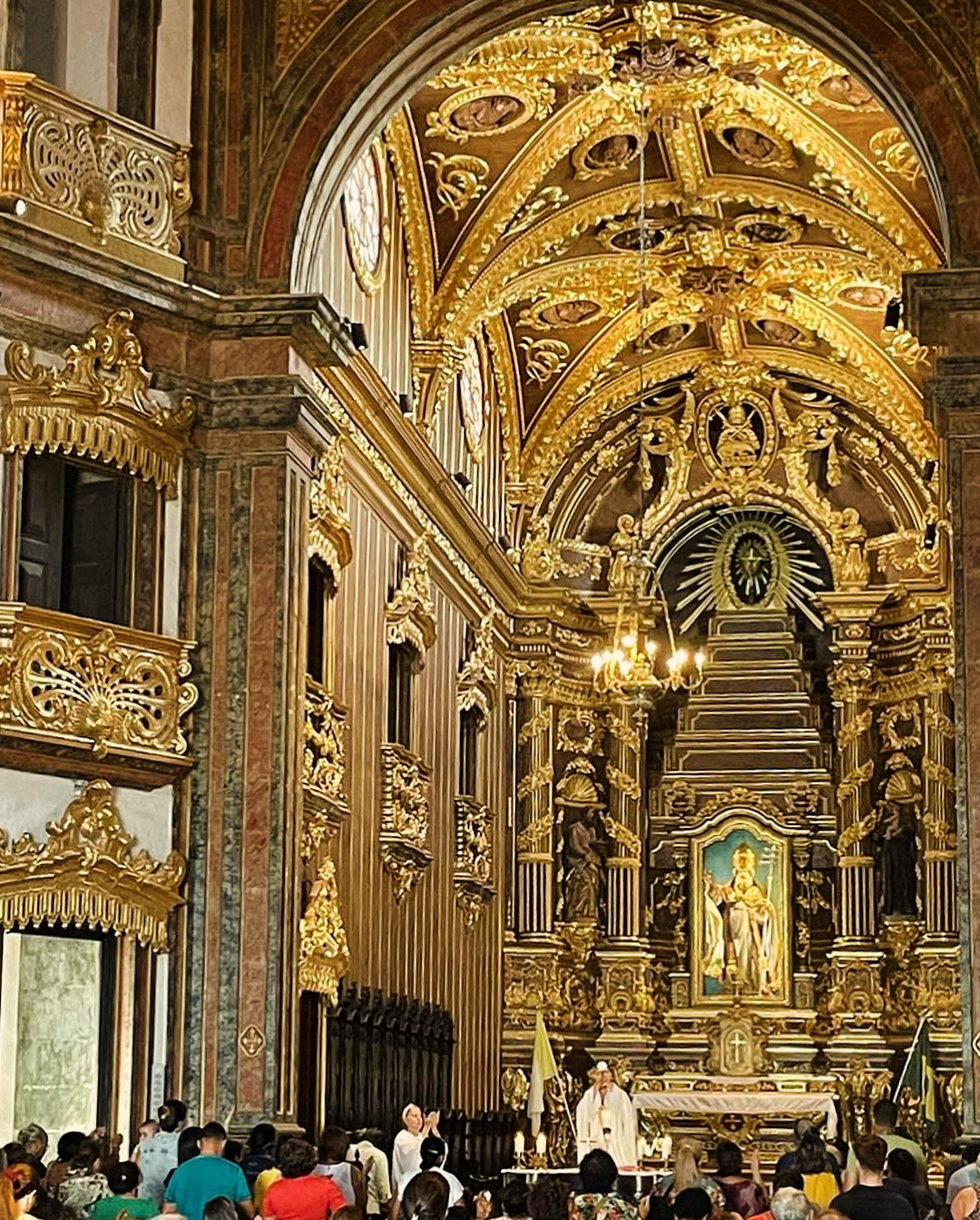
Co-Cathedral of Recife

Golden Chapel

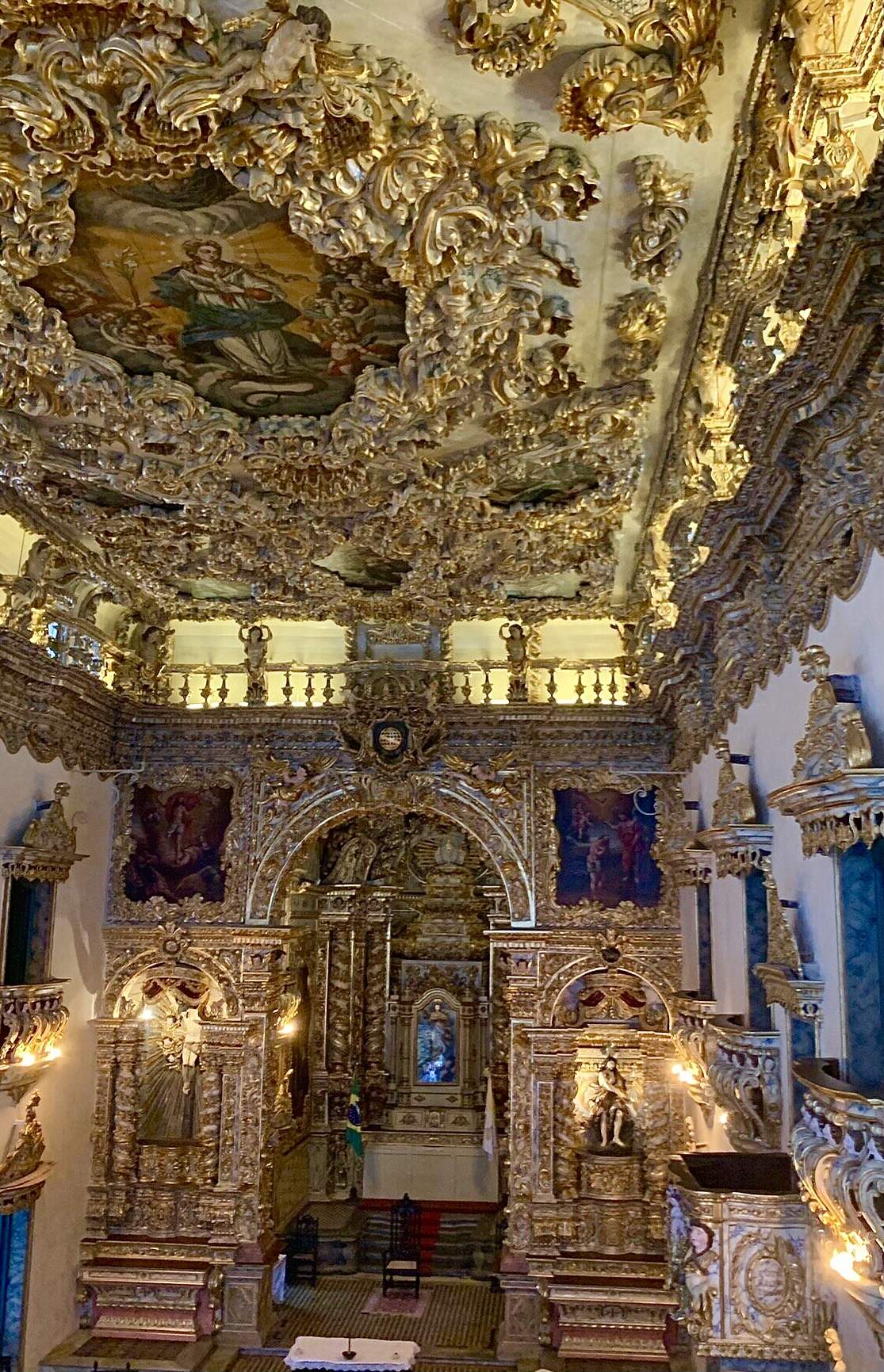
Church of Our Lady of the Conception of the Military

In 2010, the center city of Recife was the 9th most populous city in Brazil.

In 2010, the city had 268,160 opposite-sex couples and 1,004 same-sex couples. The gender proportion of the population of Recife was 53.8% female and 46.2% male.

=== Religion ===
The Patroness Saint of Recife is Our Lady of Mount Carmel (Nossa Senhora do Carmo), dating back one hundred and eight years ago (1909). Every July 16, her day, she is remembered by the Roman Catholics in Recife, in her church.

Religion	Percentage (%)	Number
Catholic Church	47.55%	624,870
Protestant	27.85%	365,938
No religion	14.88%	195,523
Other religion	5.58%	73,343
Spiritist	3.10%	40,716
Umbanda and Candomblé	0.88%	11,526
Undeclared	0.12%	1,578
Unknown	0.04%	528
Indigenous traditions	0.01%	171

Source: IBGE 2022.

== Economy ==
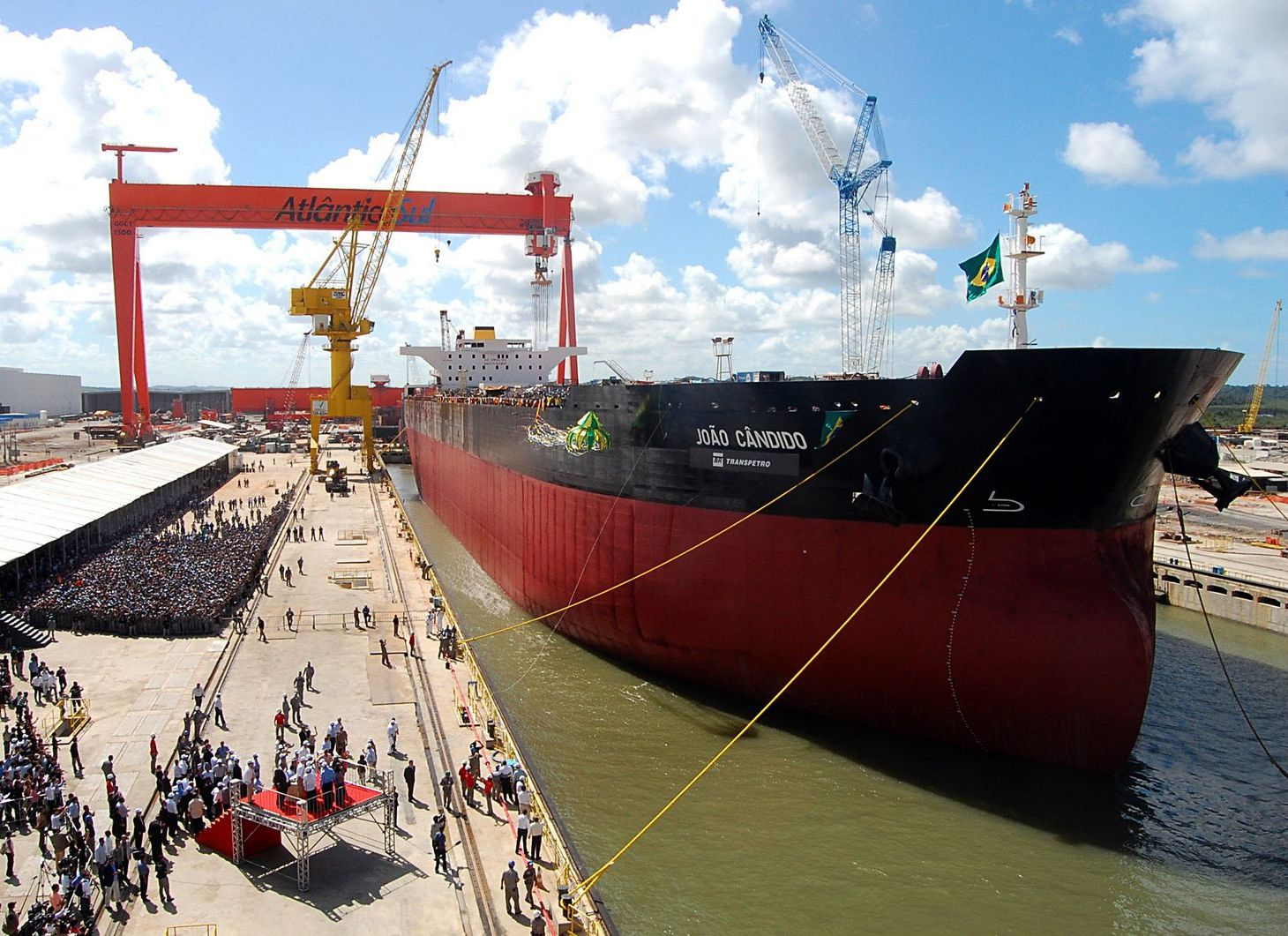
Atlântico Sul Shipyard

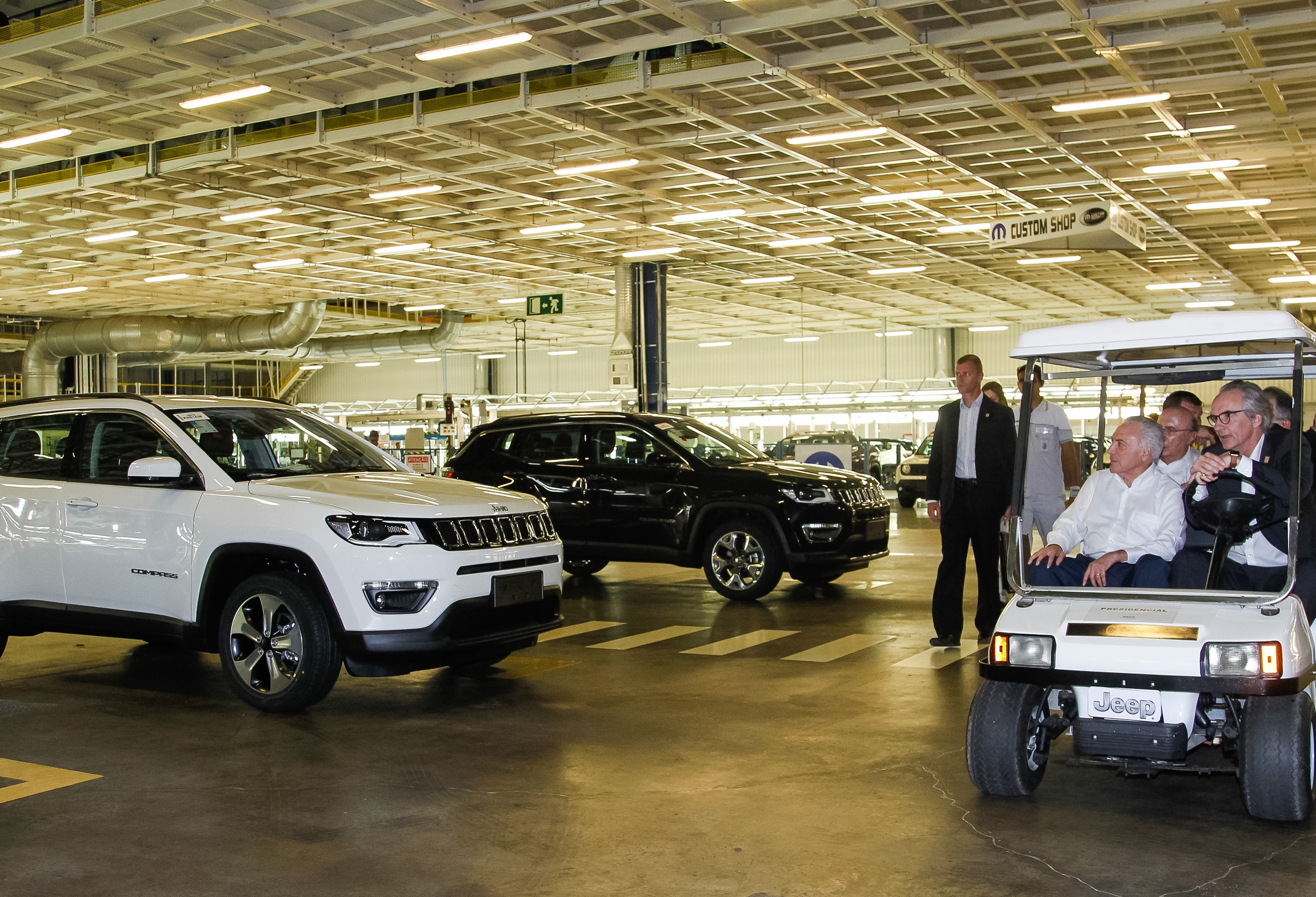
Jeep Assembly Plant (Fiat Chrysler Automobiles)

According to 2013 IBGE statistics, the GDP was at R$46,445,339,000. And the GDP per capita was at R$29,037.

=== Information technology industry ===
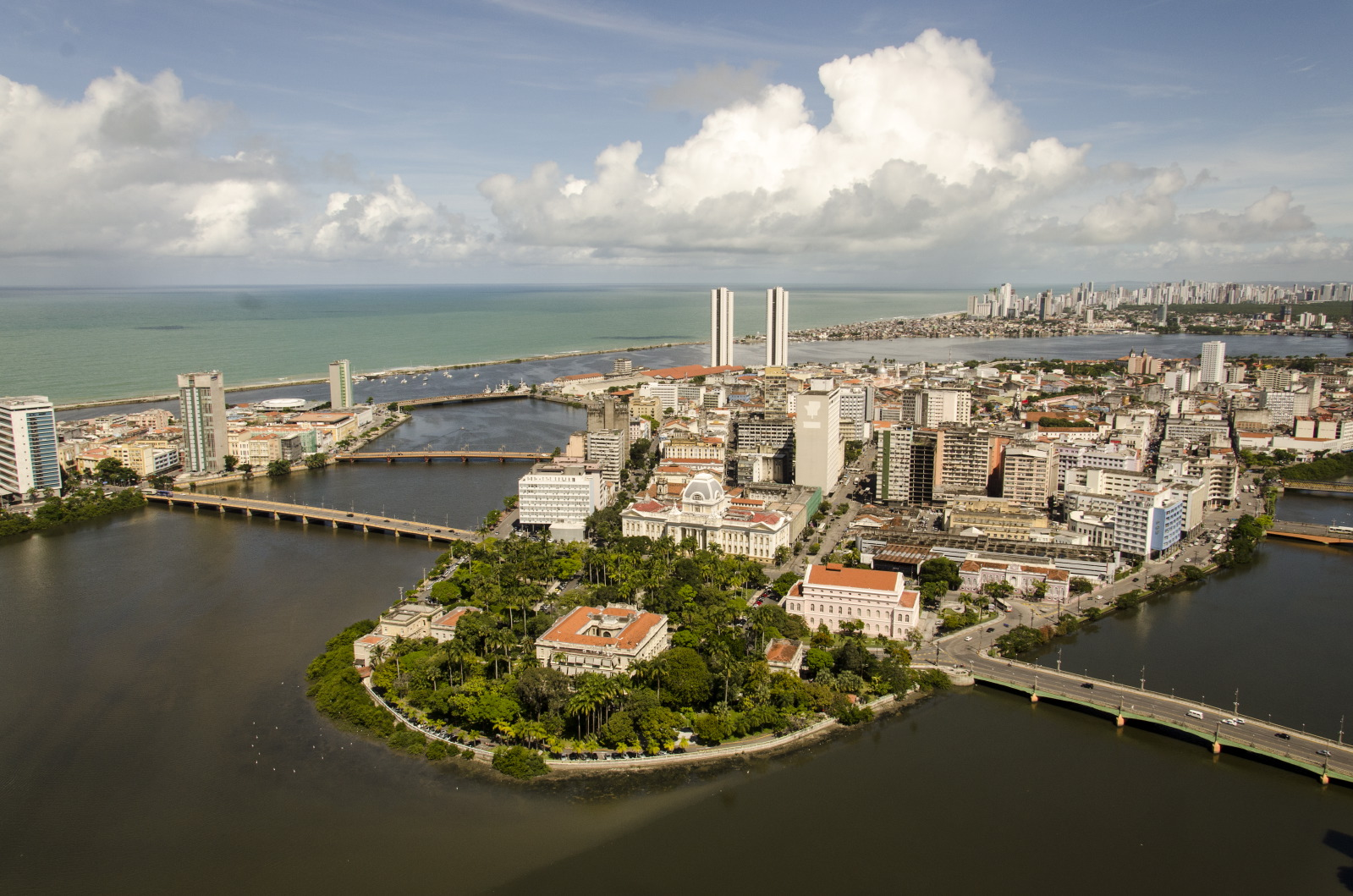
Digital Port

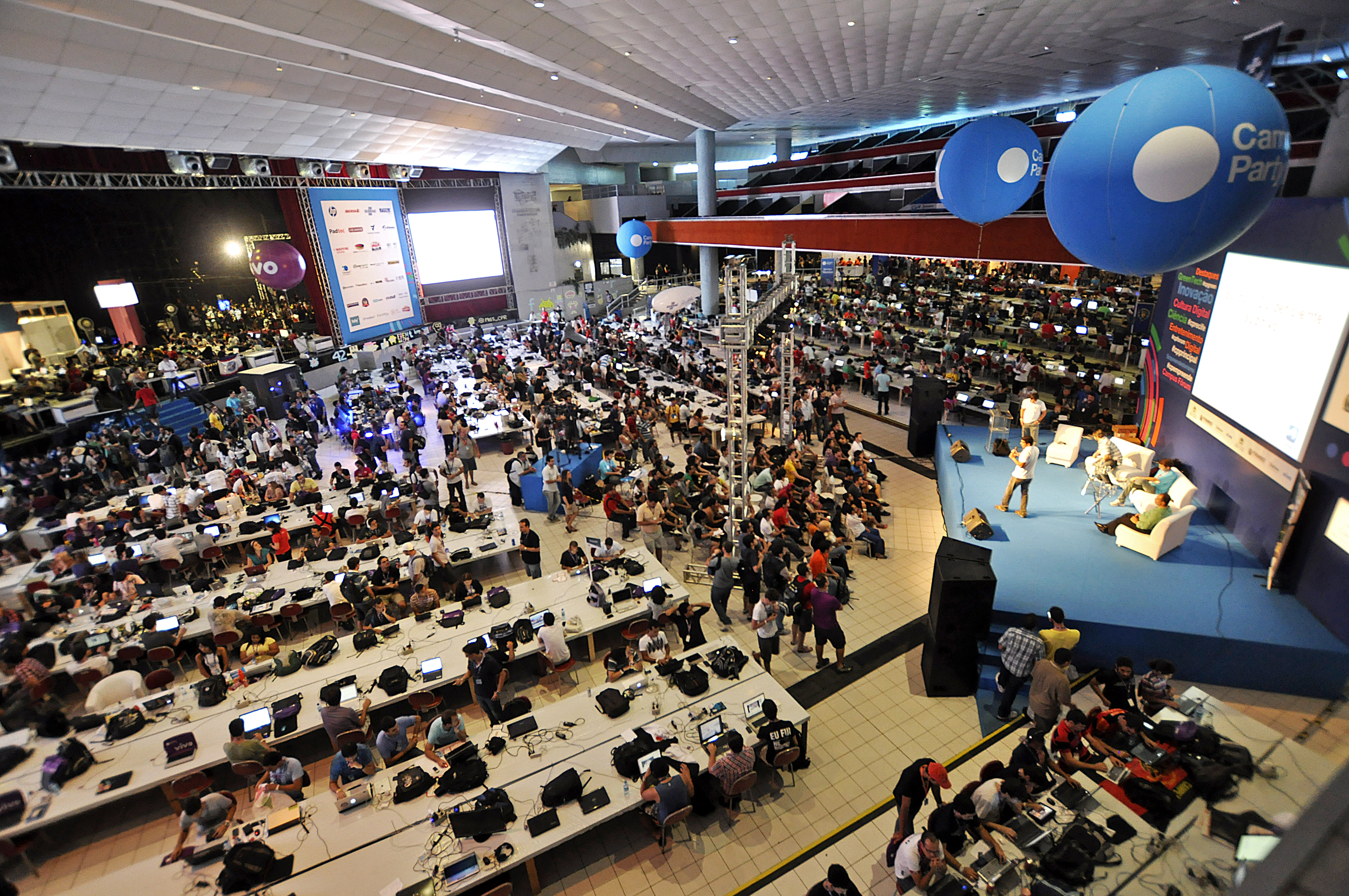
Campus Party

Recife has an area dedicated to information technology called "Porto Digital" (Digital Port) with more than 90 companies and 3,000 high tech Jobs. It was founded in July 2000 and has since attracted major investments. Generating some R$10 billion (Brazilian Reais) a year, it produces technology that is exported to the United States, India, Japan, and China, among other countries. Software manufacturing is the main activity in the Porto Digital. The Porto Digital cluster comprises small and medium companies, but multinationals from across the world, like Accenture, Motorola, Samsung, Dell and Sun Microsystems also have operations there. IBM and Microsoft transferred their regional headquarters to Recife.

Porto Digital's startups can count on a ready pool of talent, courtesy of the Federal University of Pernambuco (UFPE), which boasts one of the best computer-science departments in all of Latin America. The university began teaching programmers to use Sun Microsystems Inc.'s (SUNW) Java language in 1996, the year it was introduced. Professors at the school also teamed up to launch the Centro de Estudos e Sistemas Avançados do Recife (C.E.S.A.R), a business incubator that has played a vital role in the birth of some 30 companies.

=== Logistics hub ===
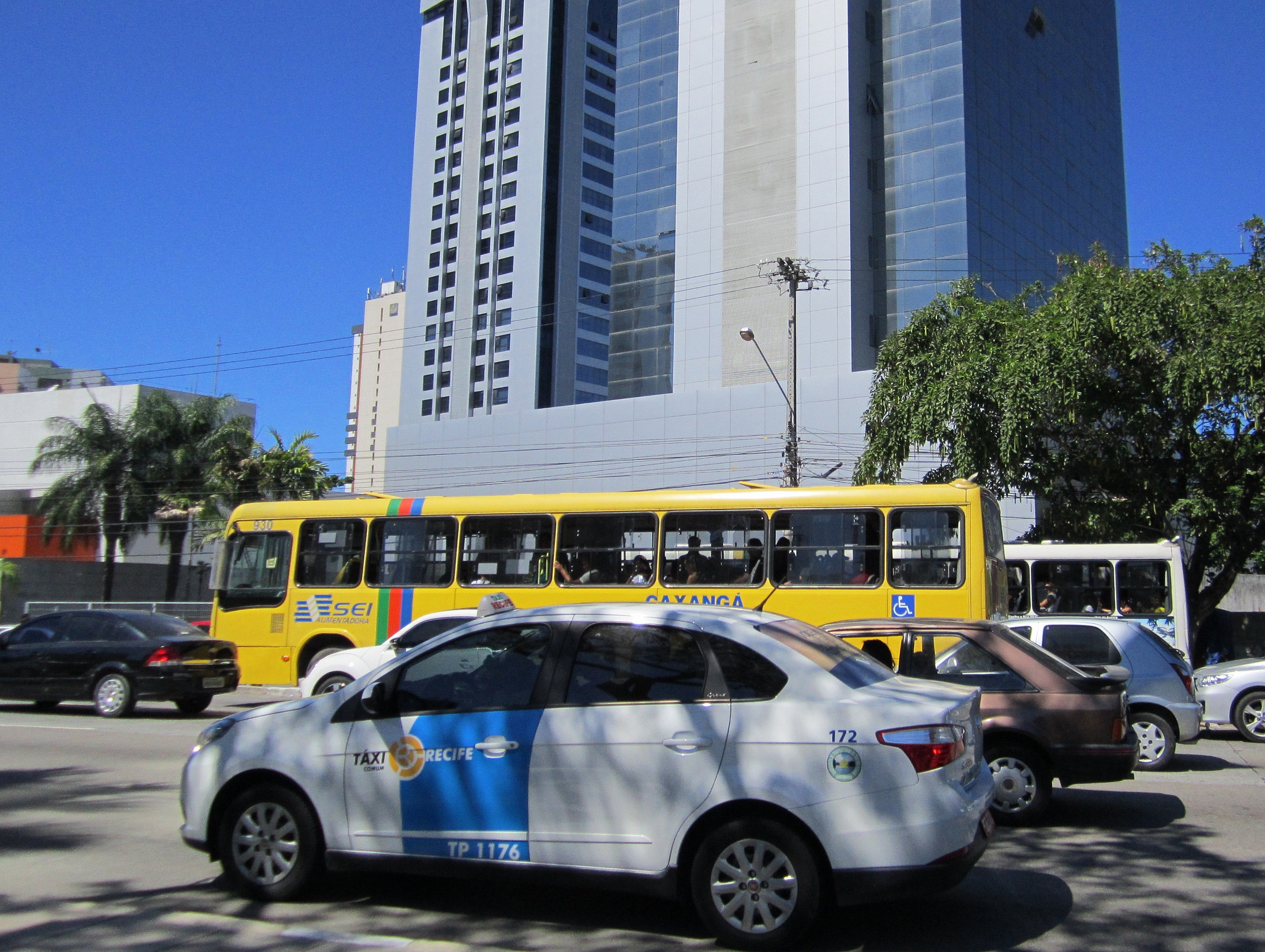
Typical white taxi of Recife.

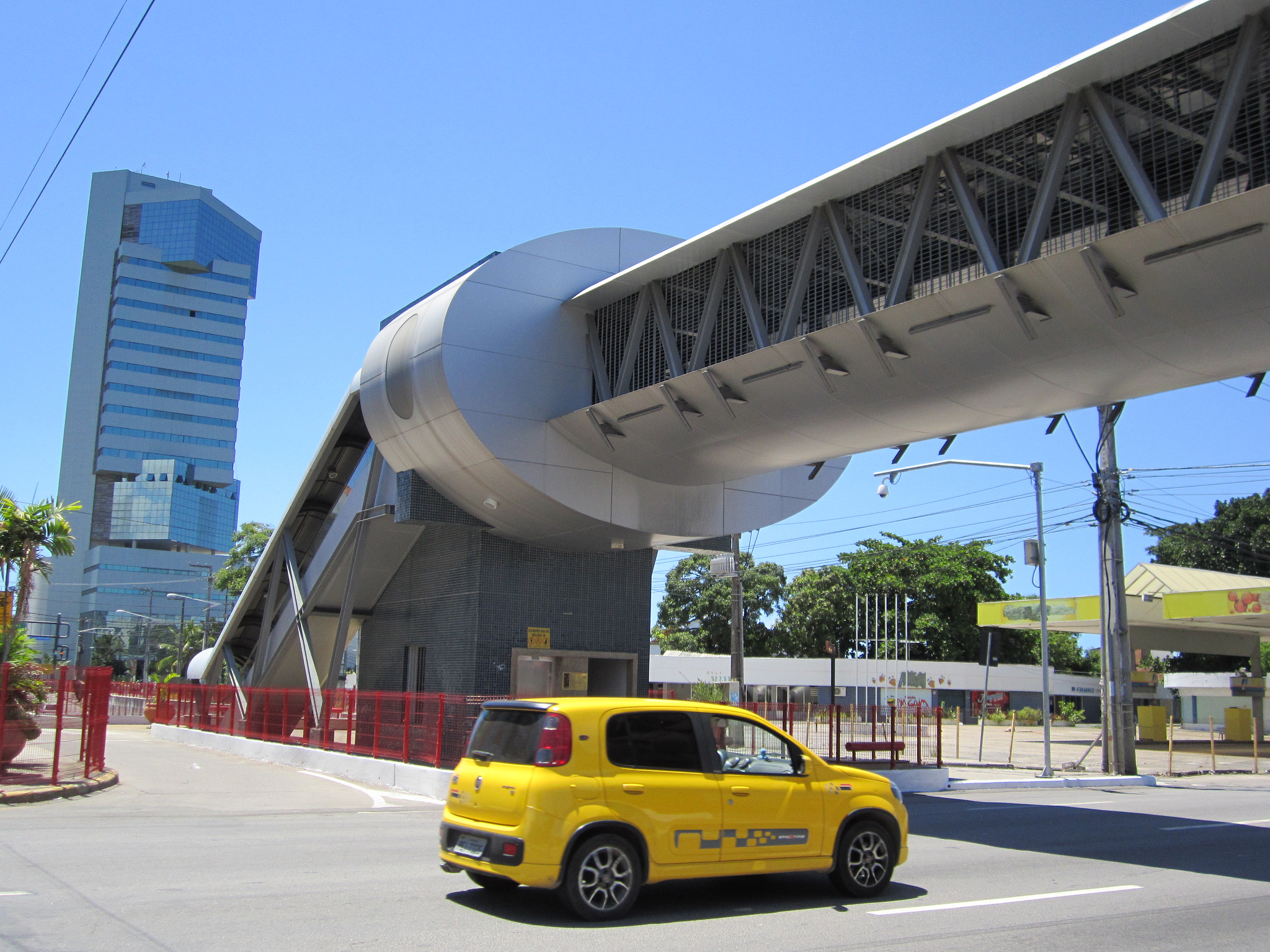
Pedestrian separation structure in Recife.

Due to its ports, airport, and geographic location in the northeastern region of Brazil, Recife is considered one of the biggest logistics hubs in Brazil. The Logistics and Communications sector employs 4% of the people in Recife, 12.3% in Jaboatão dos Guararapes and over 9% in the Metropolitan Area. These numbers were due to increase with the conclusion of the Transnordestina (the main NE Trainline) with a 1,800/1,118 km/mi extension, which will cross 3 and connect 7 States (34 municipalities in Pernambuco alone) products with Suape port (PE) and Pecem Port (CE)) with costs that are estimated to be around 4.5 R$.

Recife has historically benefited from its central location in the Northeast region. In a 200-mile (320 km) radius from Recife are four state capitals, two international and three regional airports, five international ports, 12 million people, 51% of the research centers of the Northeast and 35% of the region's GDP. Similarly, in a 500-mile (800 km) radius there are seven state capitals, five international and five regional airports, nine international seaports and two fluvial ports.

=== Shopping centers ===
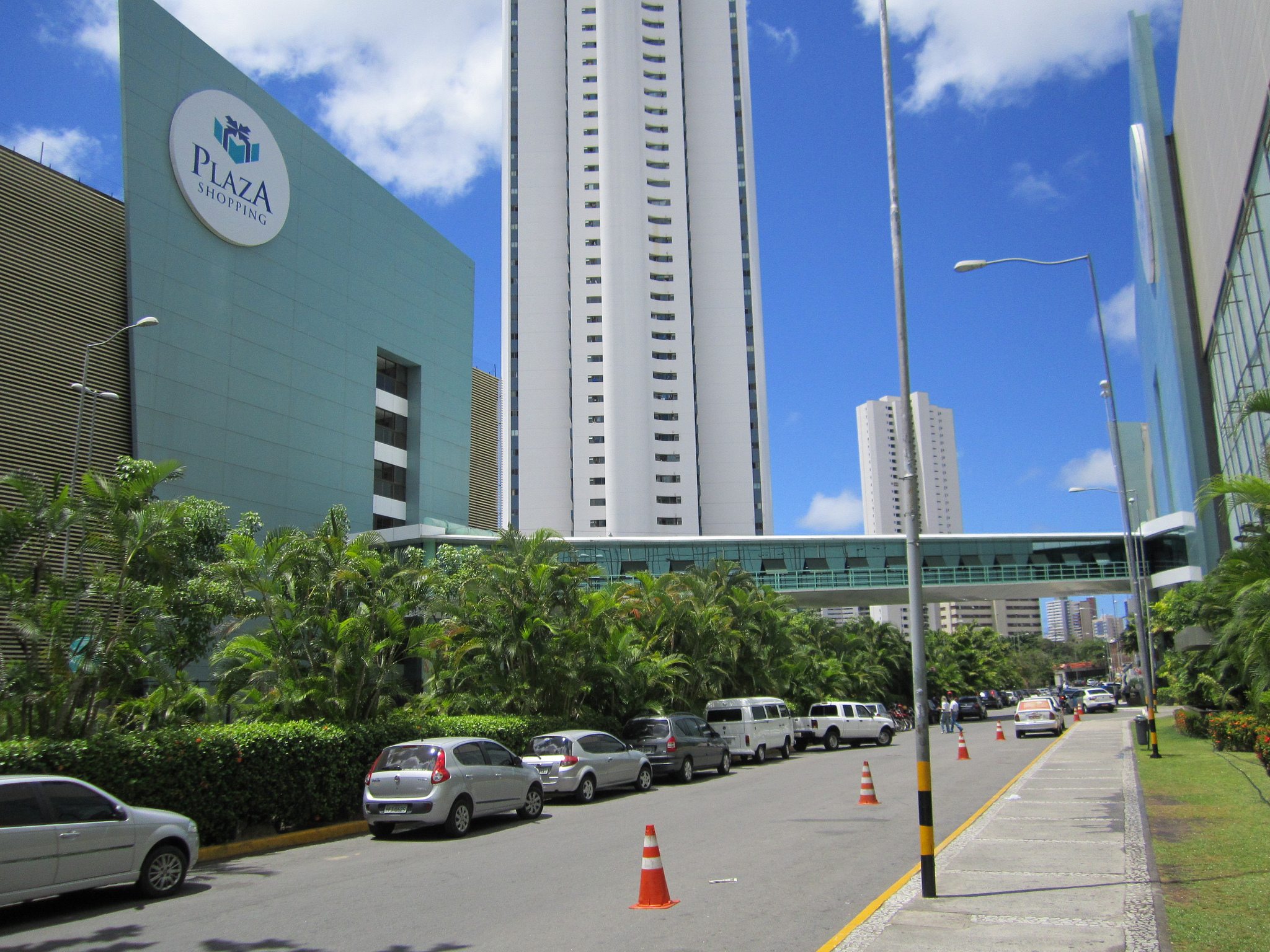
Plaza Shopping

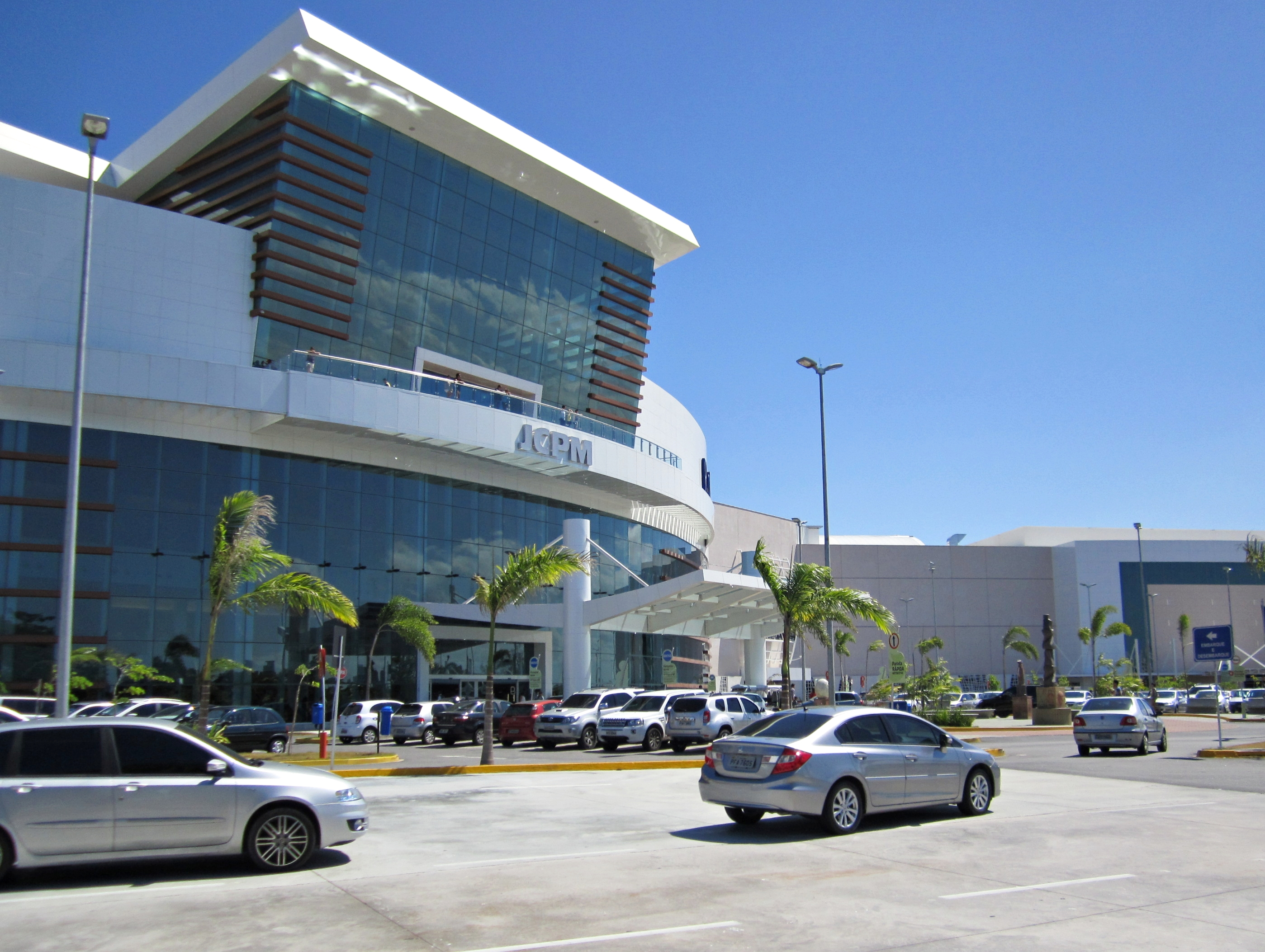
RioMar Shopping

Shopping Center Recife was inaugurated in 1980 and it was subsequently surpassed by Riomar Mall, which gross leasable area is 101.000 m^{2}, compared with 91.200m² of Shopping Recife. Other shopping centers include:

- Shopping Center Tacaruna. The first center for purchases in the North/West zone of the Recife Metropolitan Region was inaugurated on April 29, 1997, with the intention of improving the economies of the cities of Recife, Olinda, and Paulista.
- Shopping Paço da Alfândega
- Plaza Shopping Casa Forte, which was inaugurated in November 1998.
- Shopping RioMar, which was inaugurated in 2012.

=== Medical facilities ===
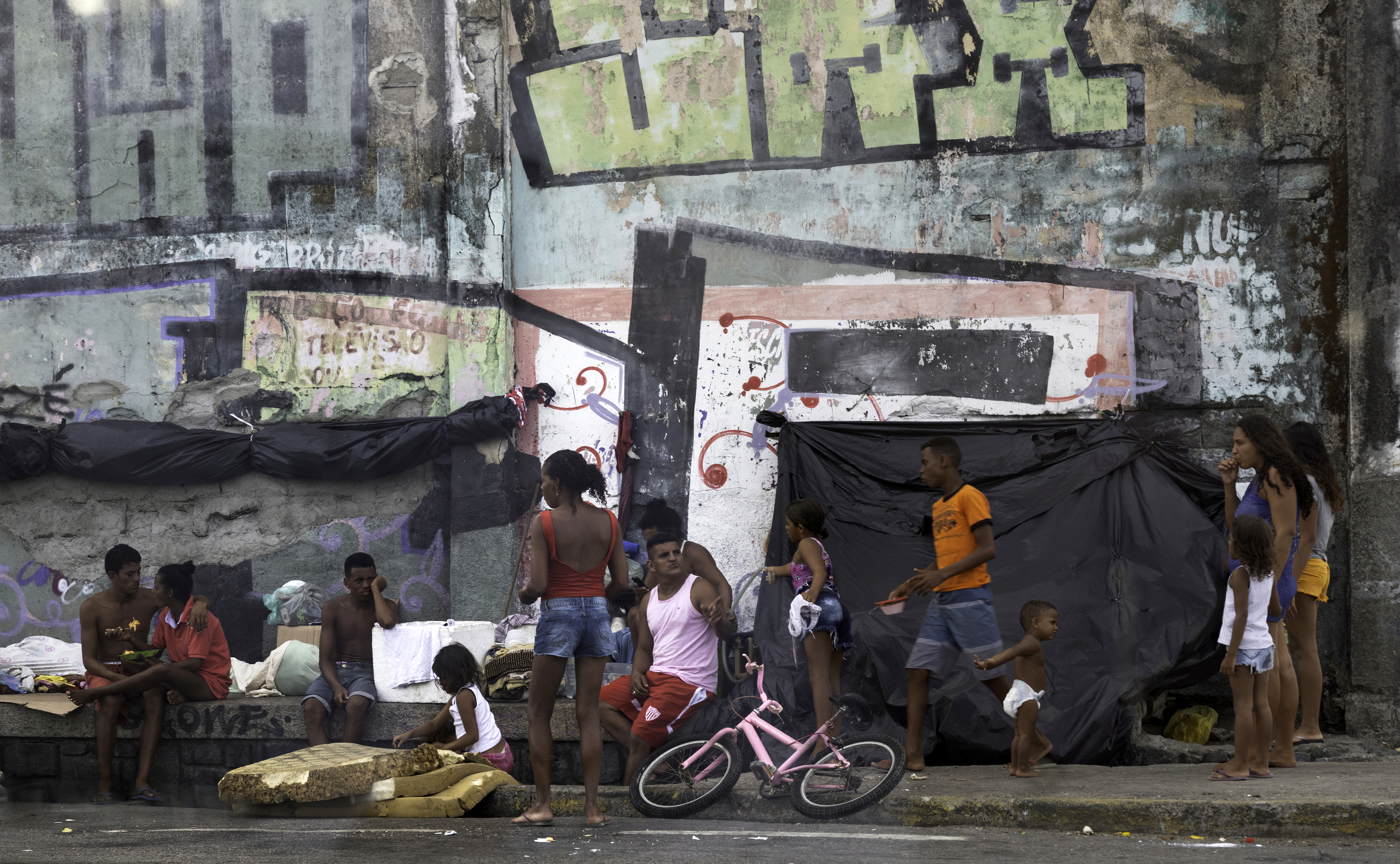
Recife, one of Brazil's capitals with the highest social inequality

The Metropolitan Region of Recife has the third largest medical pool in Brazil, after São Paulo and Rio de Janeiro. Together they make up 417 hospitals and clinics with 72,000 employees in the Metro Area and more than 120,000 in the State of Pernambuco. The medical pool offers a total of 8,990 beds and, according to the Union of the Hospitals of Pernambuco, recorded in the year 2000 an invoicing of R$220 million (Brazilian Reals). It is thanks to the pool that Pernambuco has access to more CT scan devices than more developed countries such as Canada or France.

A large portion of the modern hospitals included in the pool are located between the neighbourhoods of Derby and of the Ilha do Leite. The Hospital Real Português de Beneficência Portuguesa em Pernambuco, or "Hospital Português" (Portuguese Hospital) for short, is one of the most renowned hospitals in the country. Many people from neighbouring states go to Recife for treatment, as it has the largest and best medical facilities in the North–Northeast of Brazil. Recife has three universities / medical schools for medicine, two public, Federal University of Pernambuco and University of Pernambuco; and one private, Escola Pernambucana de Medicina FBV/IMIP (Medical School of Pernambuco).

=== Convention centers ===
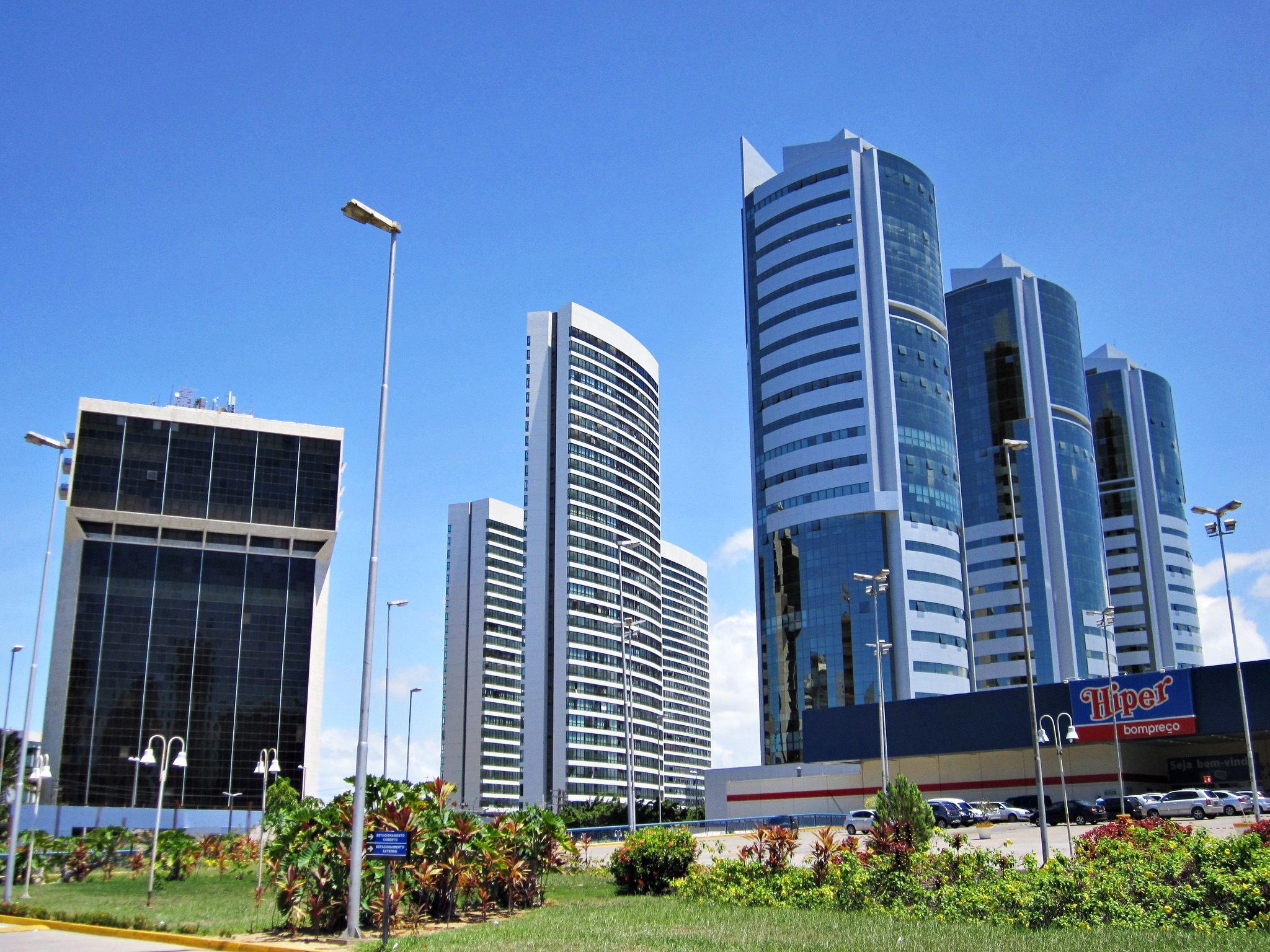
Shopping Center Recife area in Boa Viagem neighborhood.

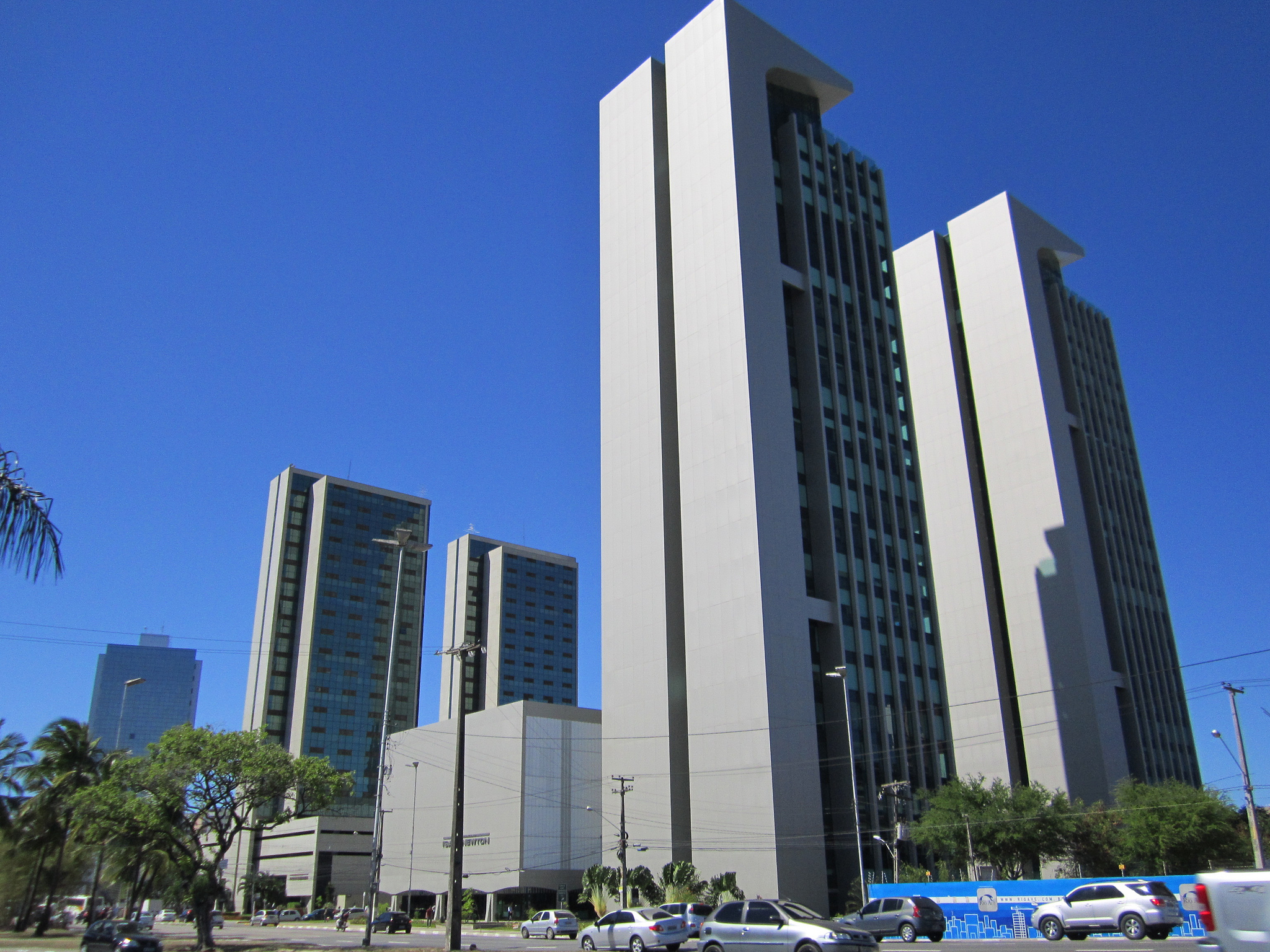
Corporate buildings in Agamenon Magalhães Avenue.

Many events taking place during the year include:

- O Virtuosi, Festival International de Musica de Pernambuco (International Music Festival);
- O Mimo, Mostra International de Musica em Olinda (International Music Show in Olinda);
- A feira da Musica Brasil/Porto Musical (Brazil Music Port);
- A Fispal Recife, Feira Internacional da Alimentacao (International Food Festival);
- Recife and Olinda Carnival.

Because of its geographic location, tourism and city infrastructure, Recife's convention centers are of a high standard. The two centers are:

- Centro de Convenções de Pernambuco (Pernambuco Convention Center)

The third largest convention center in Brazil.

- Centro de Convenções da UFPE (Federal University of Pernambuco Convention Center)

A modern theatre with 1,931 seats and 2,071 square metres (22,290 square feet) of exposition area located on the university campus.

== Government and politics ==
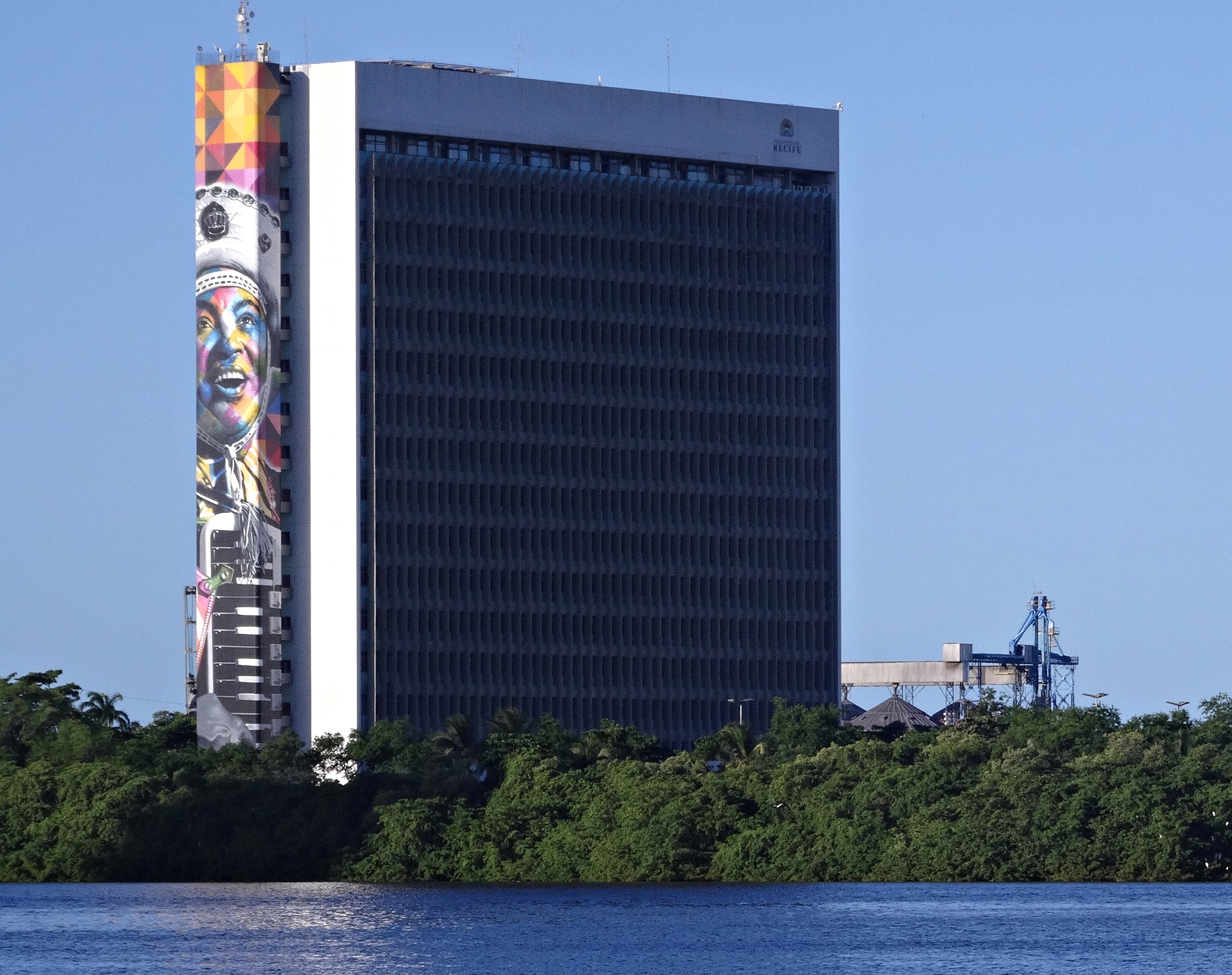
Town hall of Recife. A mural by Eduardo Kobra depicts Luiz Gonzaga.

Recife's municipal government is divided into an executive branch called the Prefeitura, led by a mayor (Brazilian Portuguese: Prefeito/Prefeita) and a legislative branch called the Câmara Municipal, consisting of 39 councillors. Elections are held every four years, with the most recent being held in 2020. The current mayor is João Campos of the Brazilian Socialist Party (PSB), son of former governor of Pernambuco, Eduardo Campos.

The city is the capital of the state of Pernambuco, and hosts administrative buildings of the state governor, legislative assembly, and judiciary.

== Tourism ==
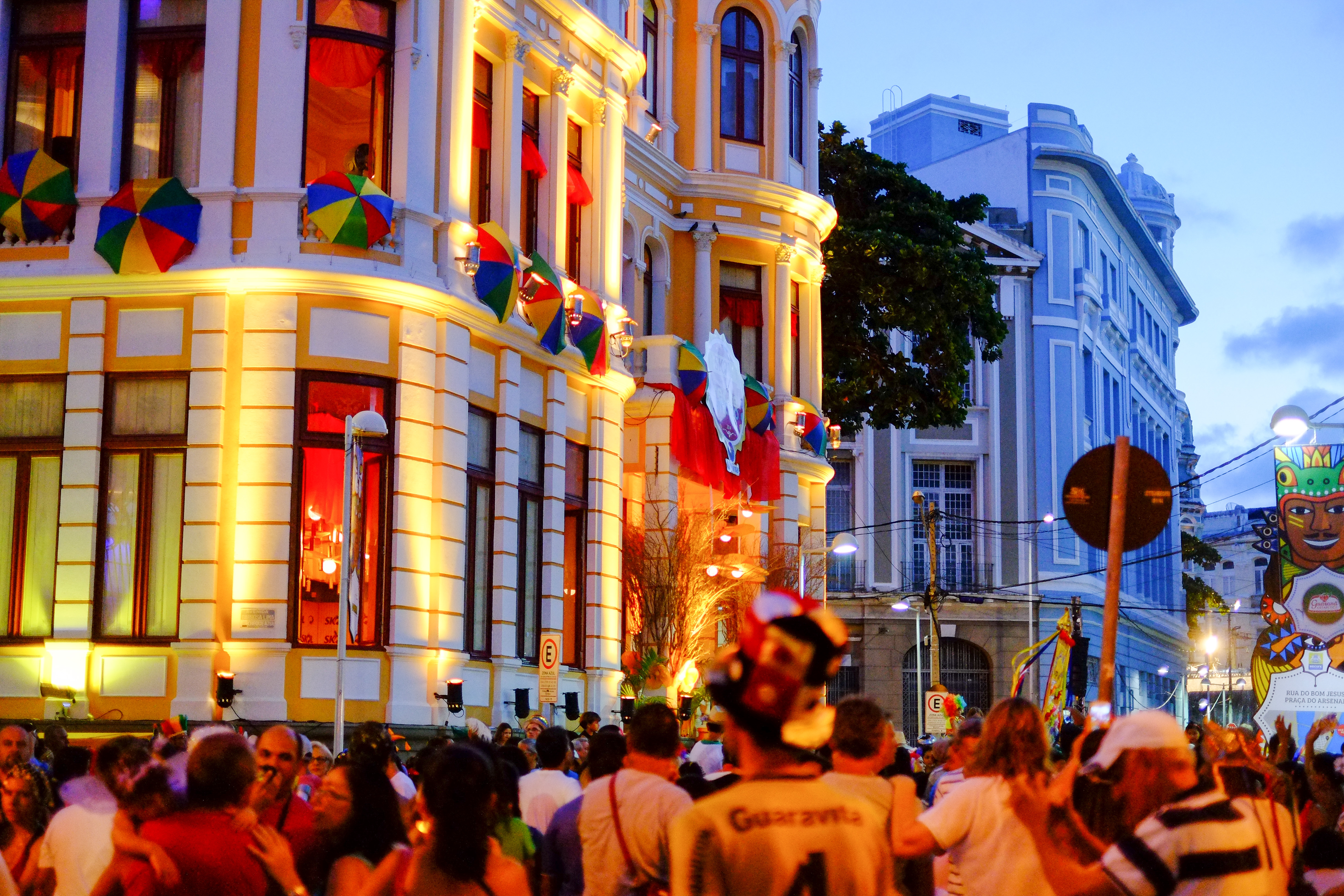
Carnival attracts a lot of tourists.

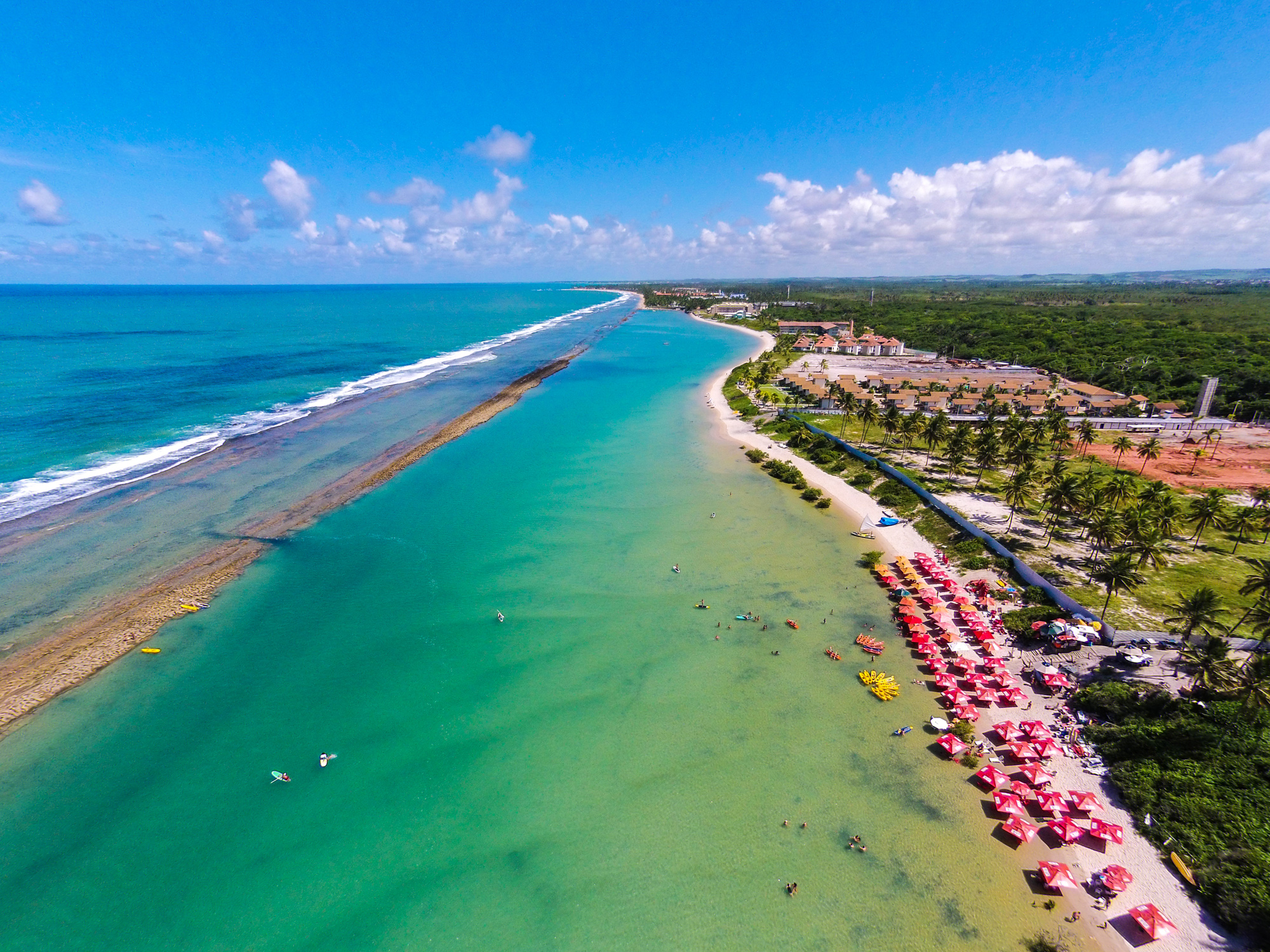
Resort in Muro Alto Beach, Porto de Galinhas.

Celebrations, holidays and other events are numerous throughout the year. The New Year begins at the beach, Praia de Boa Viagem and in Old Recife. The carnival of Recife and Olinda (which has its historic town centre considered a World Heritage Site by UNESCO in 1982) begins many weeks ahead in December with innumerable balls and parades.

In the city, the carnival festivities begin in January, as locals begin preparing for the official Carnival, which starts the week before Shrove Tuesday and Ash Wednesday in the Christian liturgical calendar. The pre-Carnival parties usually consist of percussion groups practising in local clubs, city streets and squares, and even Carnival balls. There is a variety of rhythms from different cultures. Carnival officially starts with the Galo da Madrugada, a party in Downtown Recife where people call old Recife, that attracts many people from several states of Brazil, and other parts of the world.

Recife has many quality 3, 4 and 5-Star International Hotels as well as Pousadas (traditional Bed & breakfast) and Apart-Hotels, totalling more than 11,500 bedrooms and this number increases to over 30,000 when the metropolitan area is considered.

The Mercado de São José (Market of Saint Joseph) is an old, iron construction with a popular market nearby. In the Fort Cinco Pontes (Fort of Five Points) is the state museum, Museu do Estado de Pernambuco. At the rectangular Pátio de São Pedro are the Cathedral São Pedro (Cathedral of Saint Peter) dating from the year 1782 and restored colonial houses, with numerous restaurants, bistros and bars. In the Bairro Santo Antônio (Saint Anthony neighborhood), at the meeting place of the rivers Capibaribe and Beberibe, is the Praça da República (Square of the Republic) with the Teatro Santa Isabel (Theatre of Saint Isabel), with its neoclassical front, the Law Courts, and the Palácio da Justiça (Palace of Justice). The Casa da Cultura (House of Culture) is an old prison that has been converted into a cultural space and shopping centre.

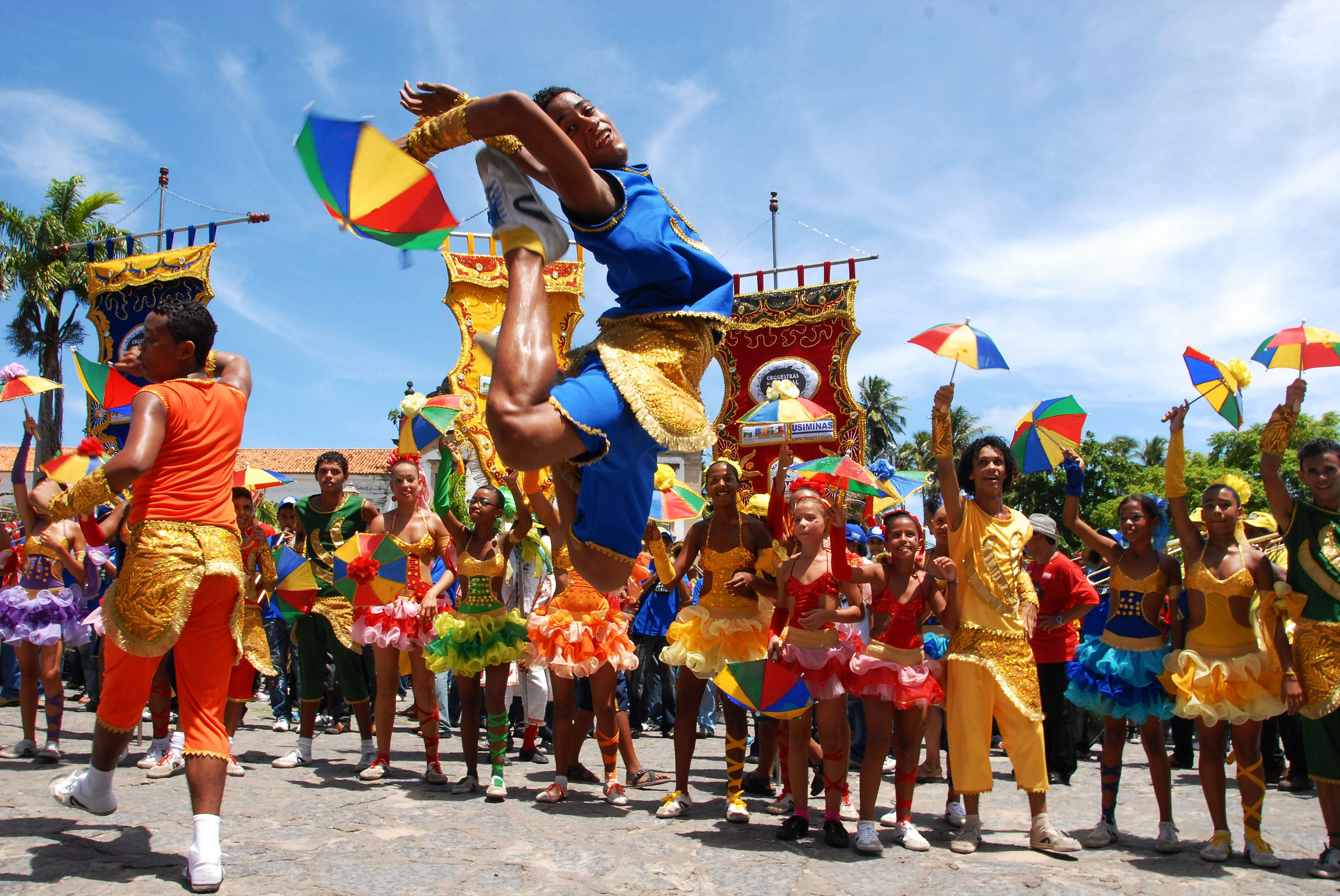
Frevo was included on the UNESCO's list of intangible heritage.

Built between 1835 and 1855, the Malakoff Tower, a monument constructed in Tunisian / Arabic style, used to be an observatory and now is a cultural centre and a place for popular gatherings. It is located at Arsenal da Marinha Square. It has been registered as an Historical Patrimony and was named after a similar monument on the Crimean peninsula, off the Black Sea, used as a defence centre for Sebastopol.

Recife has a zoo known as the Dois Irmãos Park, consisting of 387 hectares of Atlantic Forest reserve and 14 hectares of botanical gardens. It contains 800 animals, the Natural Science Museum and various ecological trails. The metropolitan area has also a giant water park 20 km (12 mi) North of Recife, called Veneza water park which has nearly one million square feet of area, ten million litres of water and many water slides for the youngsters.

Among Recife's main tourist attractions are:

- Churches, historical monuments, public markets including 17th and 18th century buildings from Portuguese and Dutch colonizers;
- Francisco Brennand's atelier of ceramic art;
- Ricardo Brennand Institute: cultural institute with museum, art gallery and library;
- Recife Antigo (Old Recife) buildings;
- Boa Viagem beach is the urban area's most important beach, and one of the many beaches in the Pernambuco area;
- Casa da Cultura: souvenir shops in an historic old prison building;
- The Carnival at locations such as downtown and Recife Antigo;
- Olinda's historic town centre, considered a World Heritage Site by UNESCO;
- New and historic cinemas, theatres and art galleries.

Architectural Digest featured Rua do Bom Jesus as of the 31 most beautiful streets in the world in 2019, noting its history and the Kahal Zur Israel synagogue.

Colonial architecture in Recife

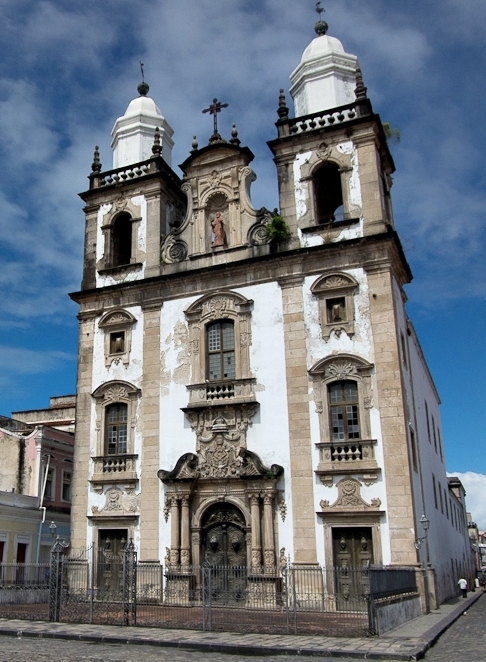
Co-Cathedral of Recife, built between 1728-1784.

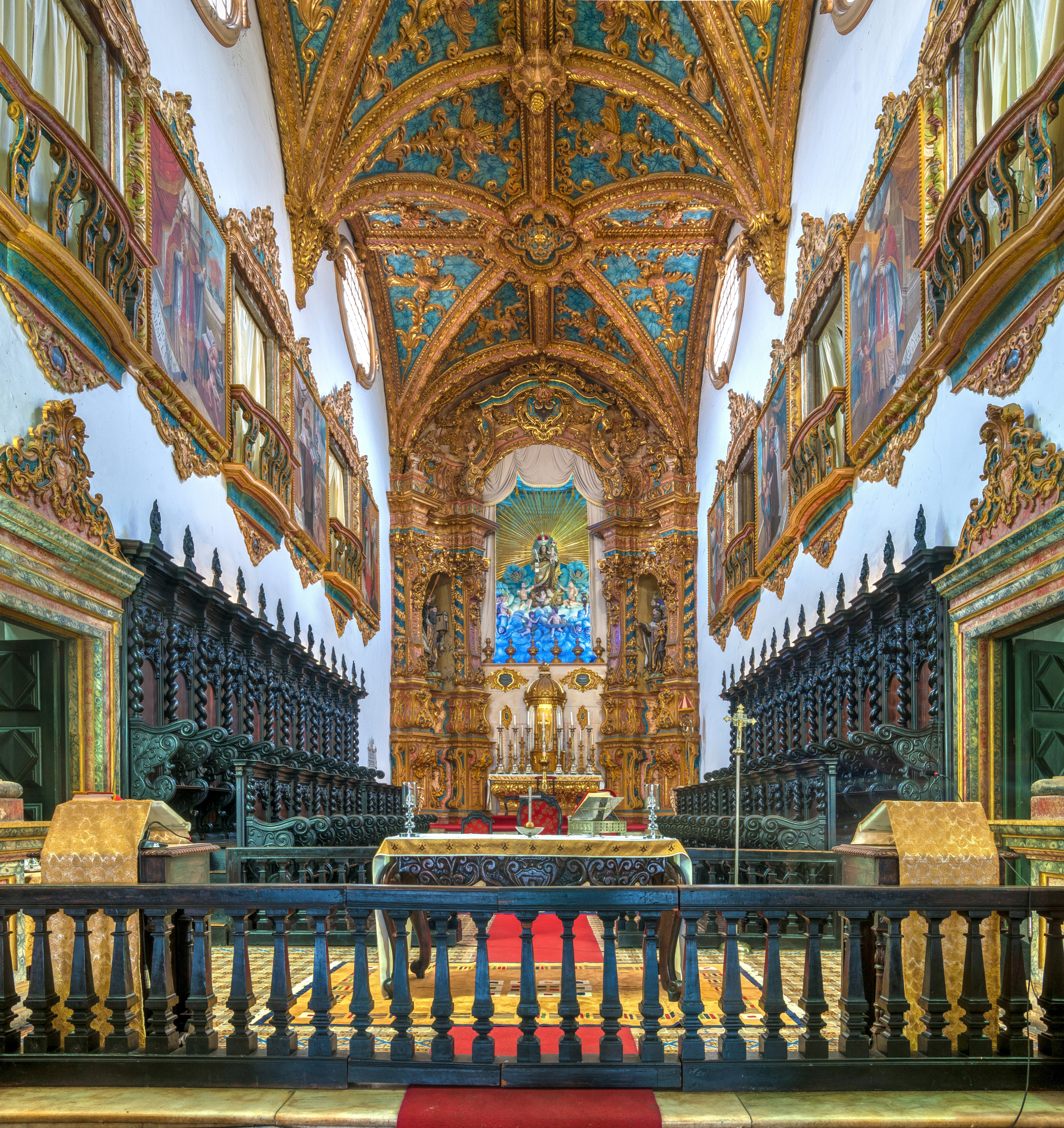
Basilica and Convent of Nossa Senhora do Carmo, Recife, built between 1665 and 1767.

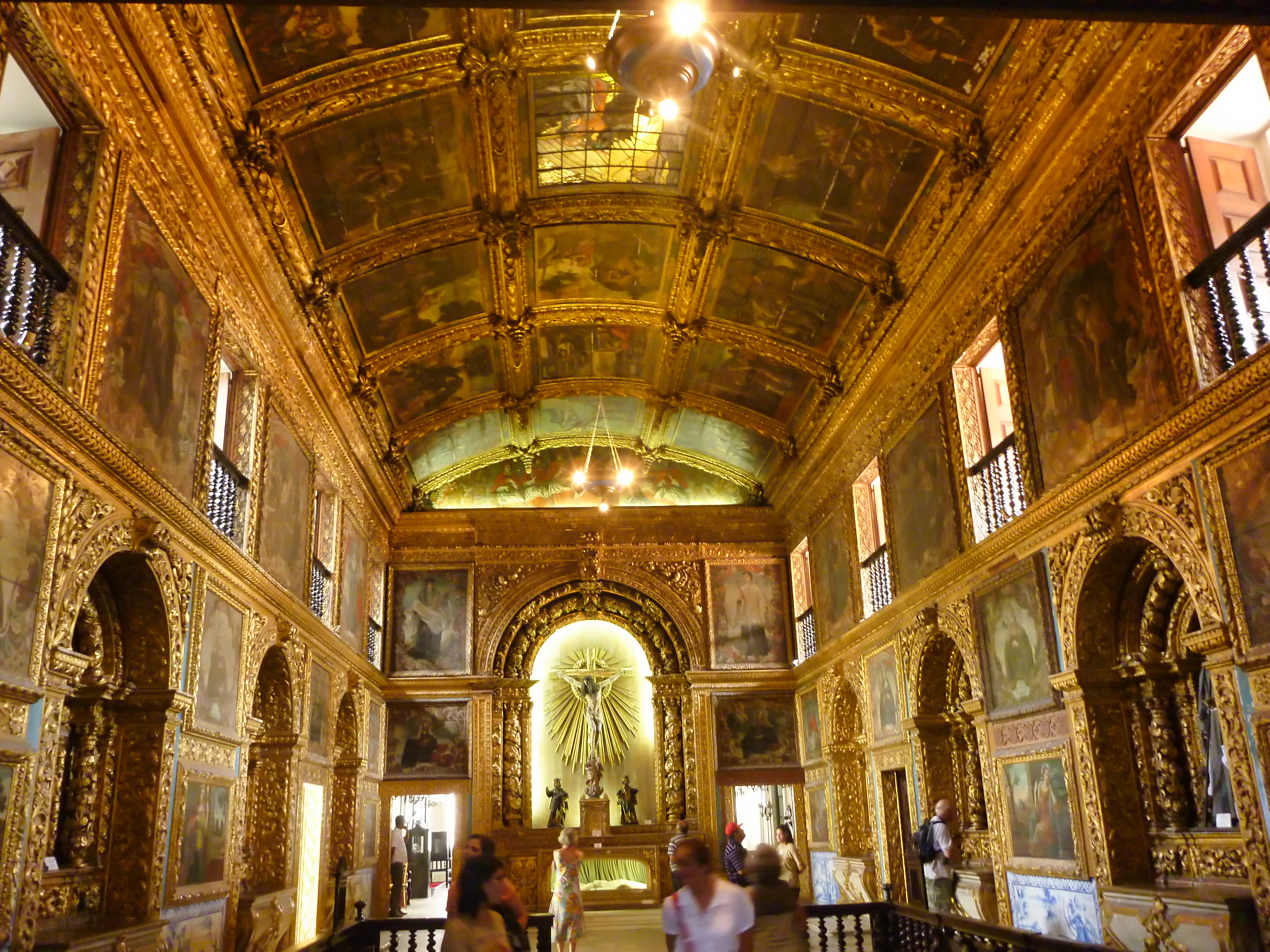
Capela Dourada, built between 1696 and 1724.

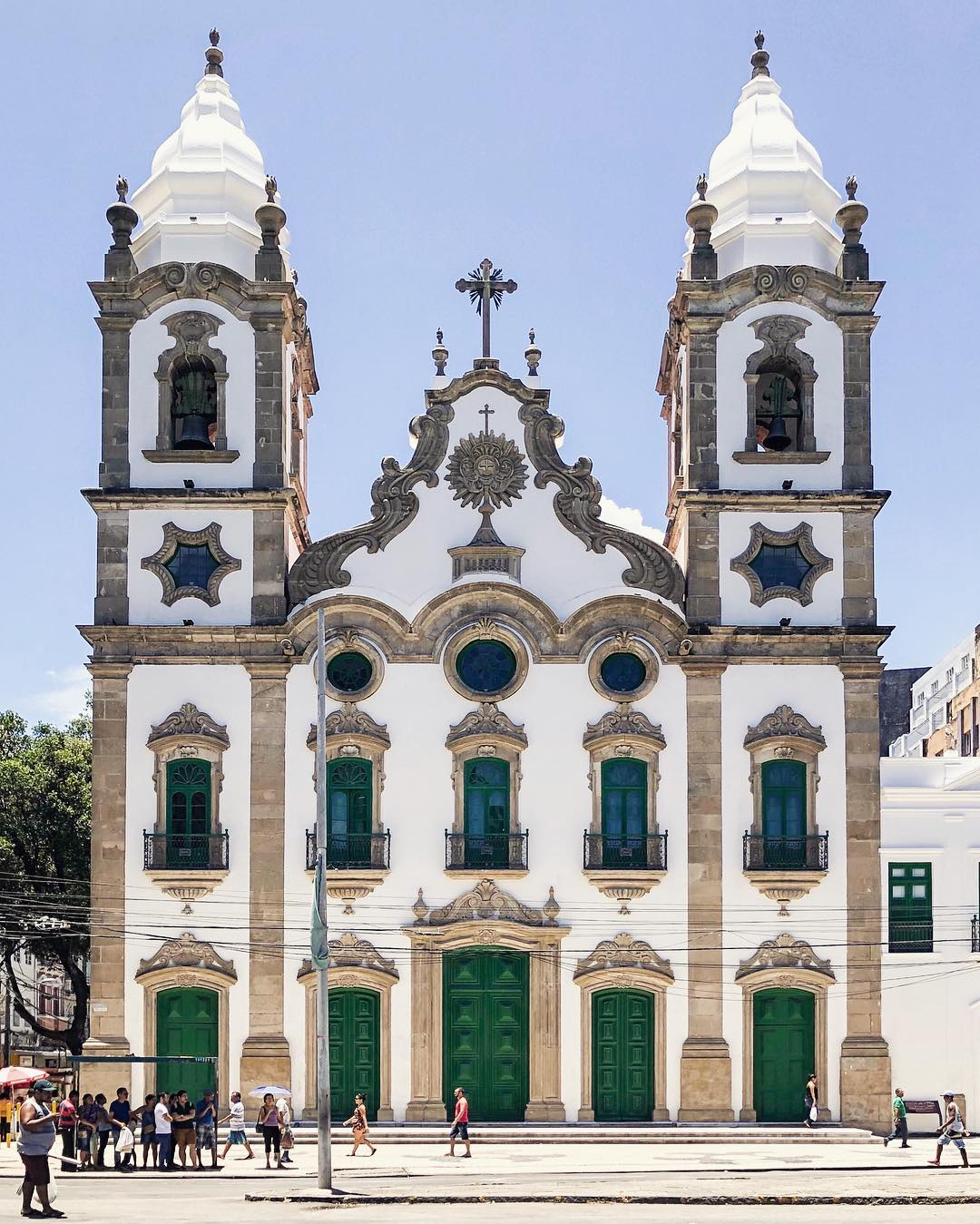
Mother Church of Santíssimo Sacramento de Santo Antônio, built between 1752 and 1790.

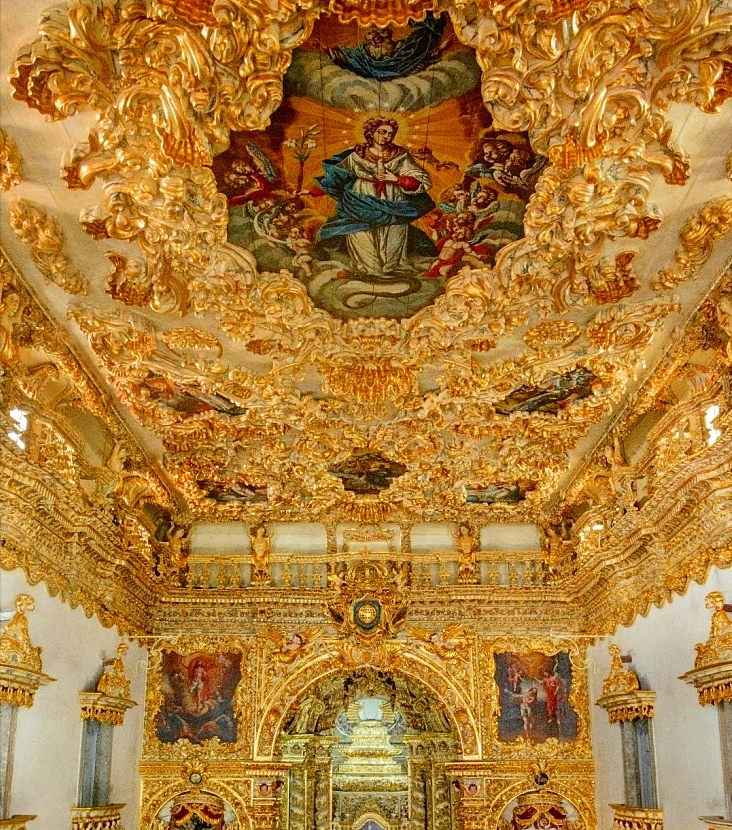
Church of Nossa Senhora da Conceição dos Militares, built between 1710 and 1771.

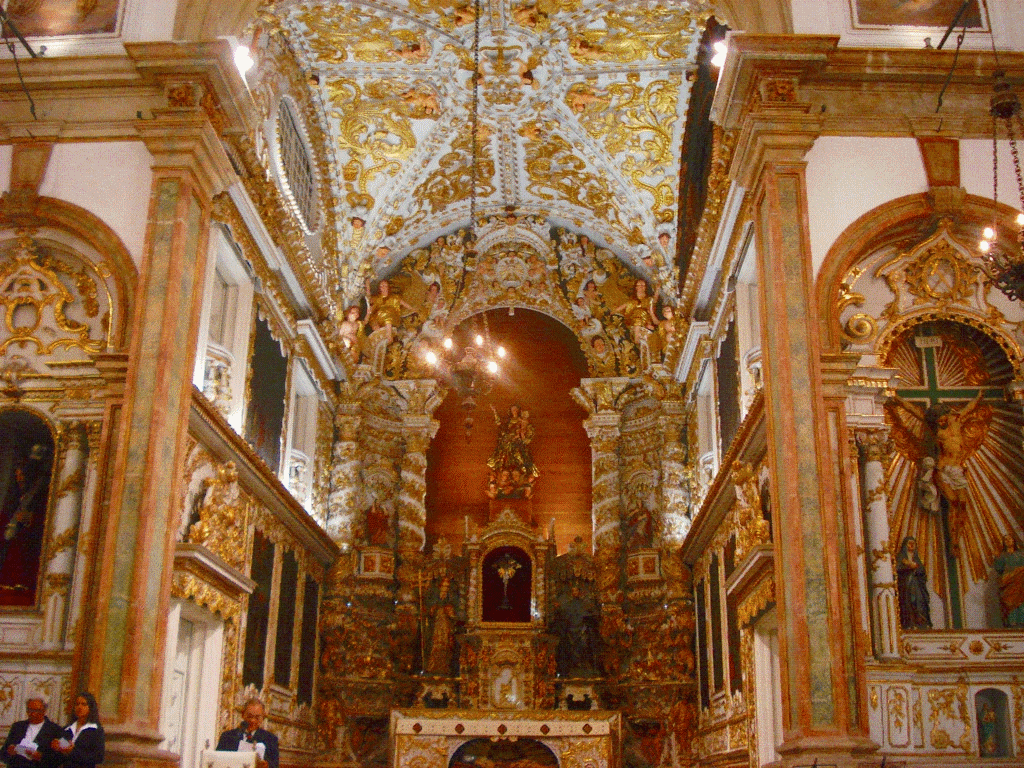
Church of Madre de Deus, built between 1680 and 1709.

=== Beaches ===
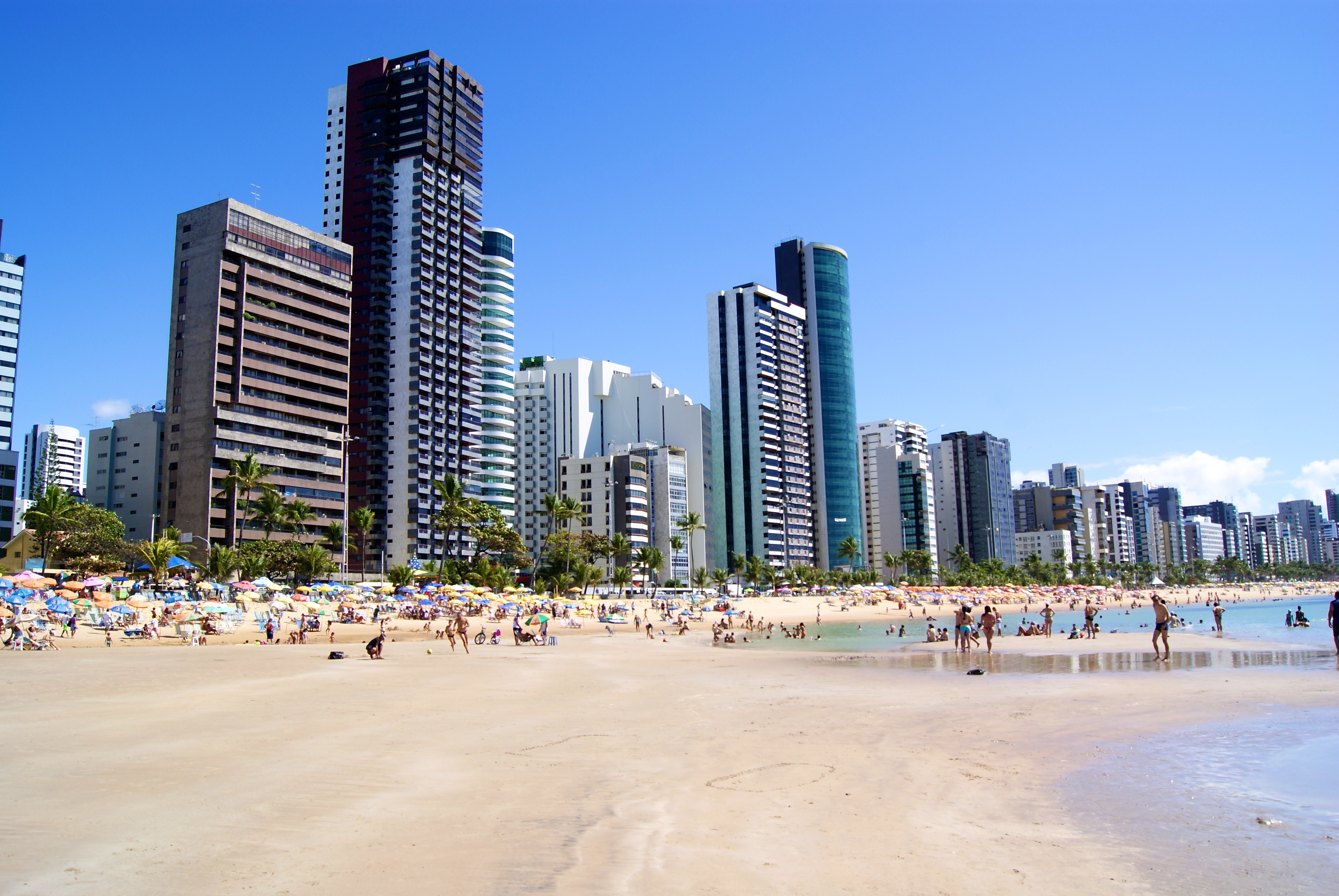
Boa Viagem Beach

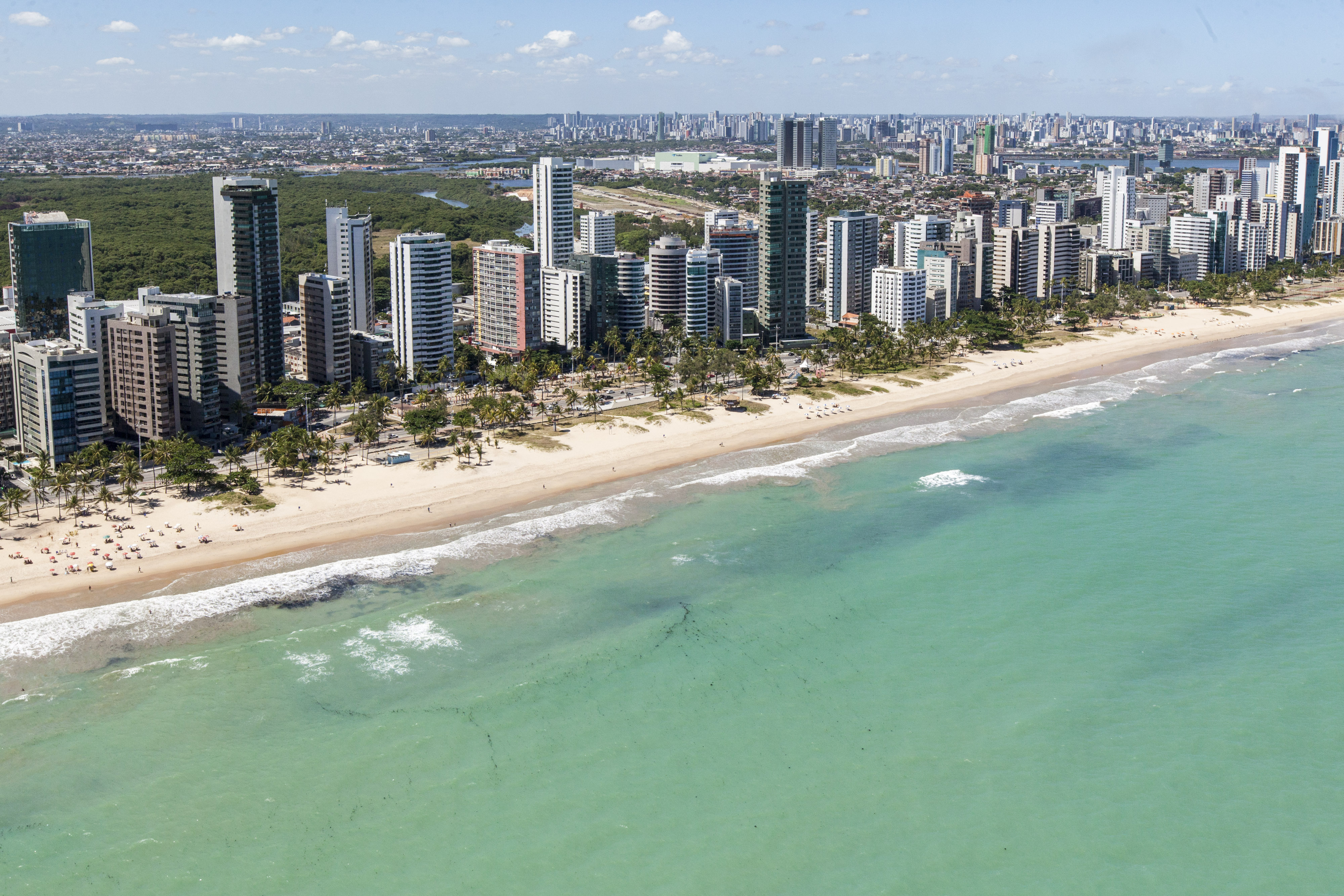
Pina Beach

Recife beaches

- Boa Viagem, Pina and Brasília Teimosa

Jaboatão beaches

- Piedade, Candeias and Barra de Jangada

Olinda beaches

- Rio Doce, Casa Caiada and Nossa Senhora do Ó

North beaches

- Janga, Pau Amarelo, Conceição and Maria Farinha (with one of the largest water park in Brazil – Veneza water park (Paulista RMR) 18/29 km N
- Gavoa, Itamaracá and Jaguaribe. Itamaracá Island has many beaches such as Coroa do Avião, Forte Orange, Quatro cantos and Pontal (Itamaracá RMR) 30/45 km N

== Education ==
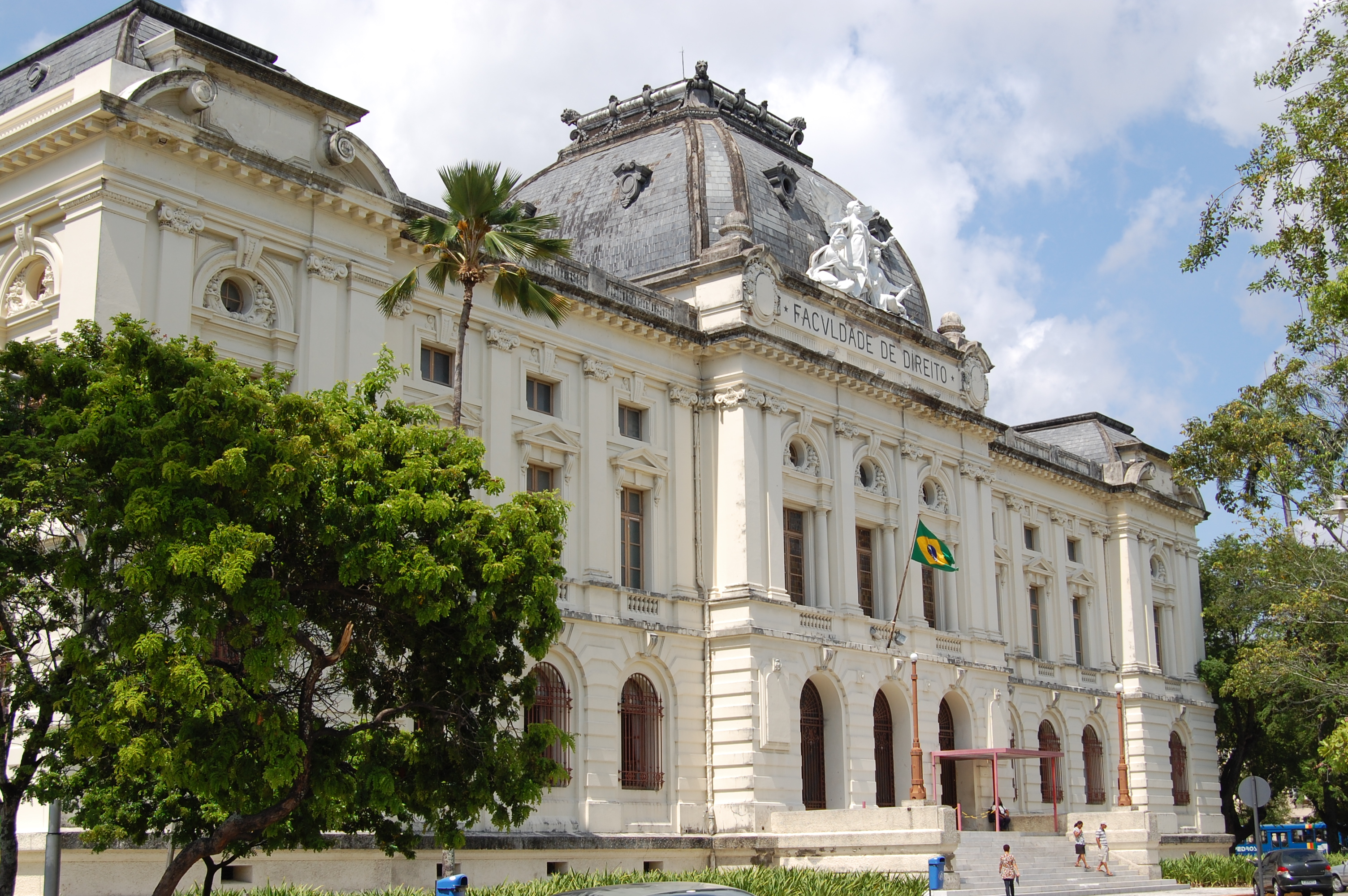
School of Law at the Federal University of Pernambuco.

There are international schools, such as the American School of Recife and the ABA Maple Bear Canadian School.

Recife is home to several higher education institutions (83), notably several public-owned universities:

- Universidade Federal de Pernambuco (Federal University of Pernambuco); UFPE (federal, free);
- Universidade Católica de Pernambuco (Catholic University of Pernambuco); UNICAP (private, run by the Society of Jesus (Jesuits), paid);
- Universidade de Pernambuco (University of Pernambuco); UPE (state-owned, free);
- Universidade Federal Rural de Pernambuco (Federal Rural University of Pernambuco); UFRPE (federal, oriented to agriculture, free);
- Faculdade Estácio do Recife (former Faculdade Integrada do Recife) (School College of Recife); FIR (private, paid);
- Faculdade Marista do Recife (Marist College of Recife); FMR (private, run by the Marist congregation, paid)
- Faculdade SENAC Pernambuco (private, paid);
- Centro Universitário Maurício de Nassau (Central University of Maurice de Nassau); UNINASSAU (private, paid)
- Instituto Federal de Educação, Ciência e Tecnologia de Pernambuco (Federal Institute of Education - Center of Technology of Pernambuco); IFPE (technological college, federal, free);
- Faculdade de Tecnologia de Pernambuco (College of Technology of Pernambuco); FATEC-PE (technological college, state-owned, free).

== Culture ==
Recife is home to the frevo, a regional dance and music, typical in carnival, and Mangue Beat, a type of Brazilian rock with mixture of Maracatu, Ciranda, Rap and other musical styles. The Festival de São João, held annually in June, celebrates traditional culture and music that originated in the region.

During carnival, downtown Recife holds one of the most authentic and democratic celebrations: every year more than two and a half million people open the festivities of the Brazilian Carnival at Galo da Madrugada. Recife and Olinda combined have 25 museums, 38 art galleries, 2 symphony orchestra halls, 15 theatres, 1 opera house and more than 40 movie theatres.

=== Carnival ===
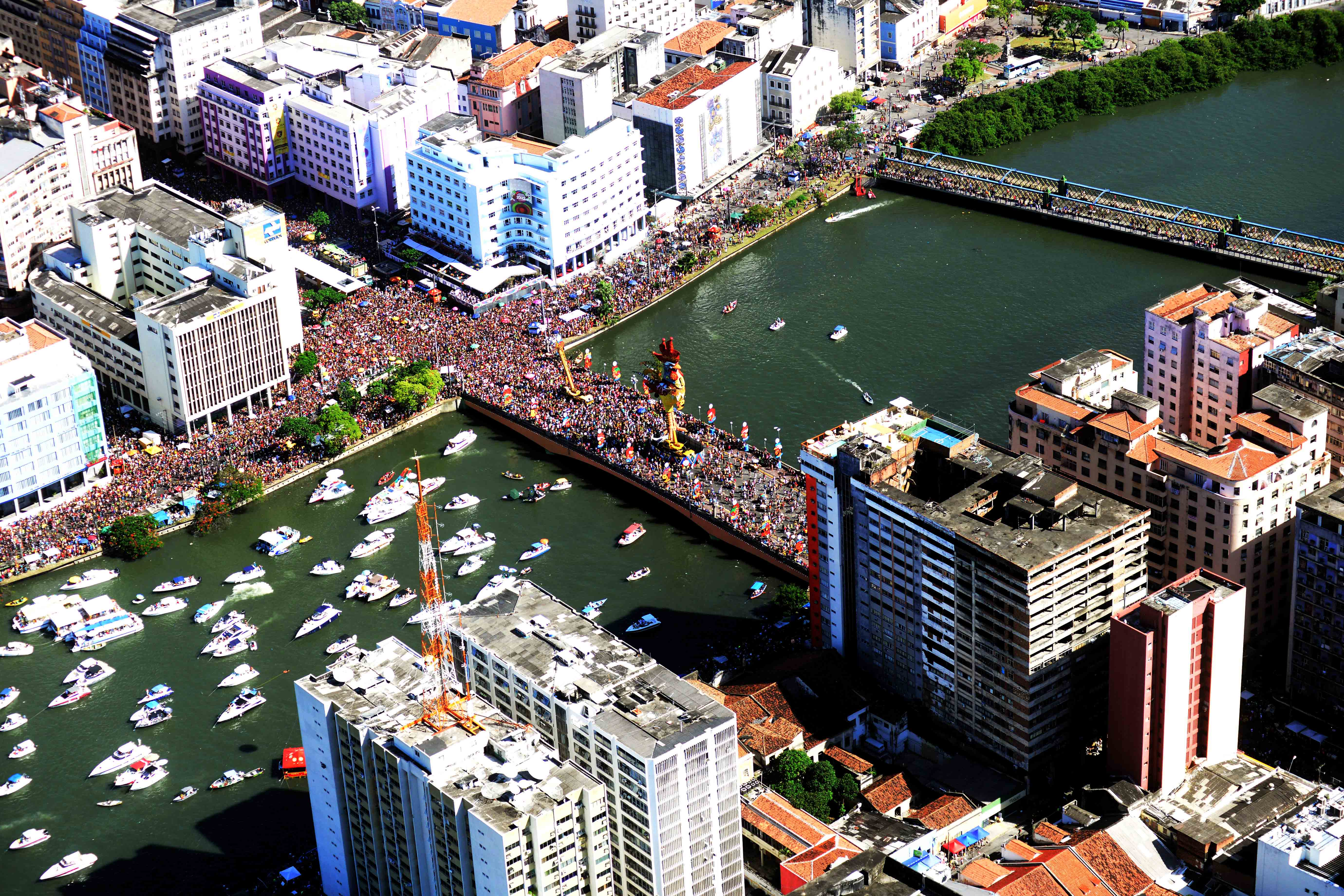
Galo da Madrugada, Recife Carnival.

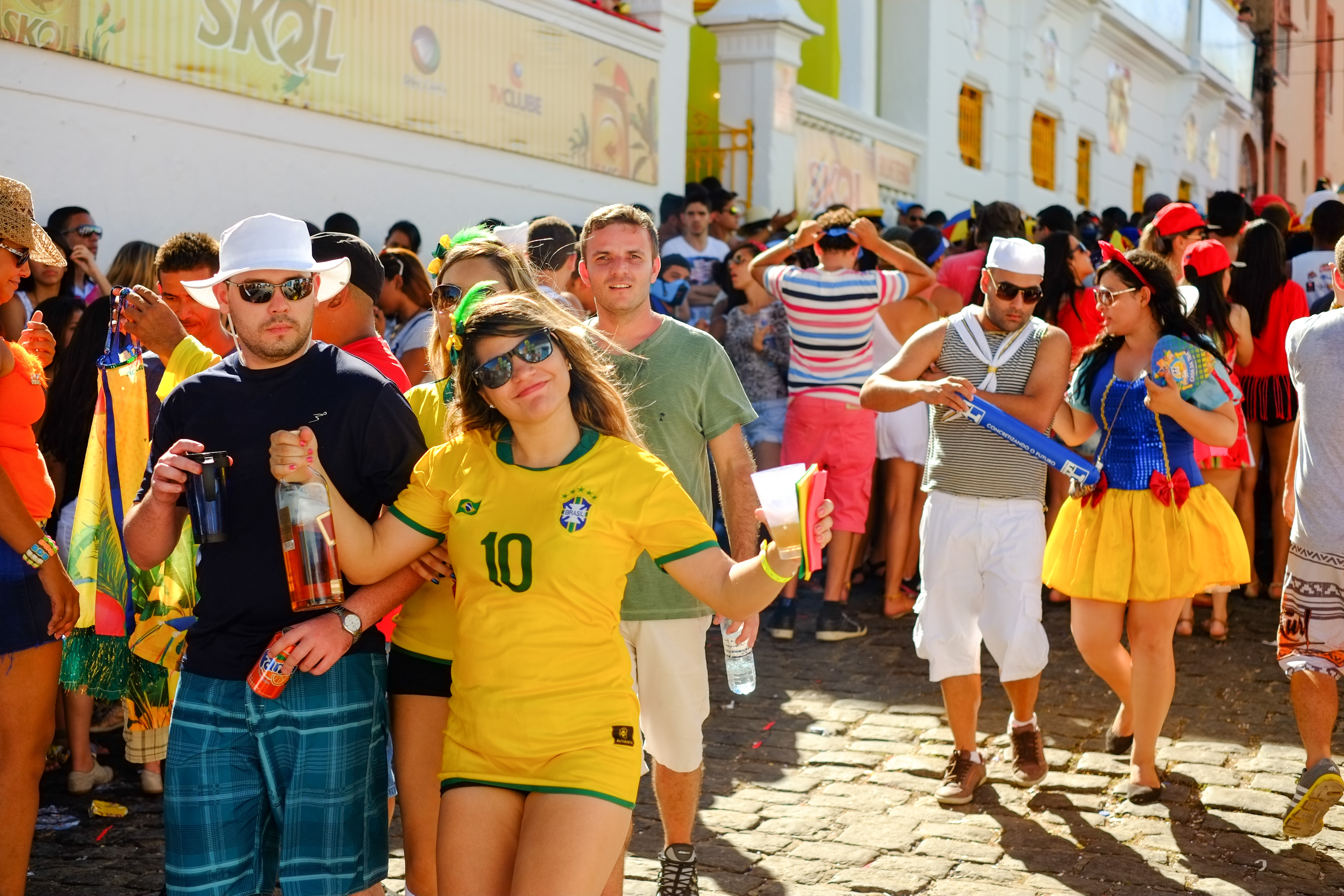
Olinda Carnival, in the historic city of Olinda, near Recife.

The four-day period before the Christian liturgical preparatory season Lent leading up to Shrove Tuesday and Ash Wednesday is carnival time in Brazil. Rich and poor alike forget their cares as they gaily party in the streets. Pernambuco has large Carnival celebrations with more than 3000 shows in the streets of the historic centre performed by over 430 local groups, including the Frevo, typical Pernambuco music. Another famous carnival music style from Pernambuco is Maracatu. The cities of Recife and Olinda hold the most authentic and democratic Brazilian Carnival celebrations. The largest carnival in Brazil is Galo da Madrugada, which takes place in Downtown Recife on Carnival Saturday. Another famous event is the "Noite dos Tambores Silenciosos." (literally, Night of the Silent Drums) Carnival. Recife's Carnival is nationally known, attracting thousands of visitors every year.

The party starts a week before the official date, with electric trios "shaking" the Boa Viagem neighborhood. On Friday, people take to the streets to dance to the sound of frevo and to dance with maracatu, ciranda, caboclinhos, afoxé, reggae and manguebeat groups. There are still many other entertainment centers spread out around the city, featuring local and national artists. One of the highlights is Saturday when more than two and a half million people follow the Galo da Madrugada group. Every day, there is the Night of the Silent Drums, on the Pátio do Terço, where Maracatus honor slaves that died in prisons.

=== Museums ===
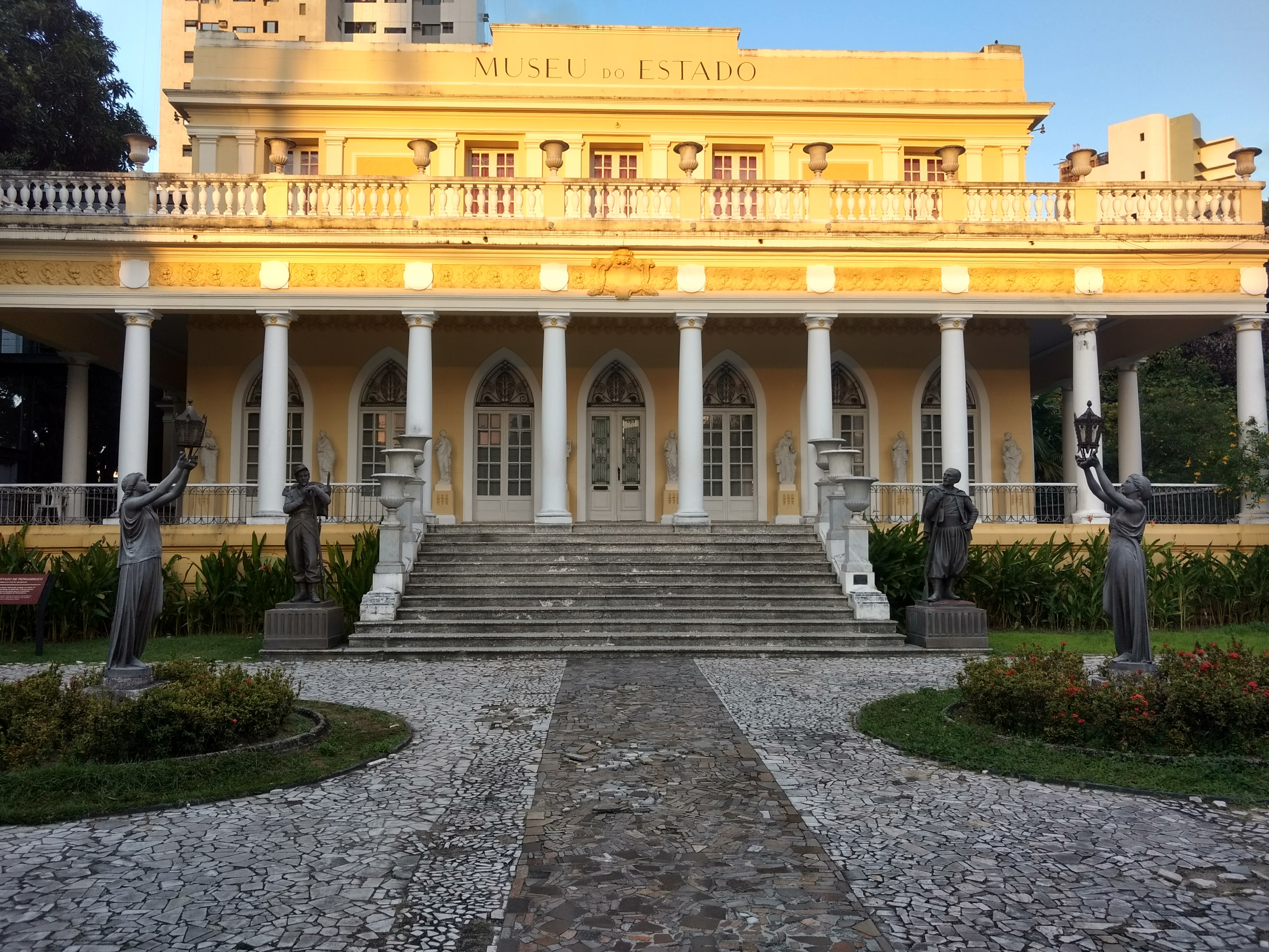
Pernambuco State Museum.

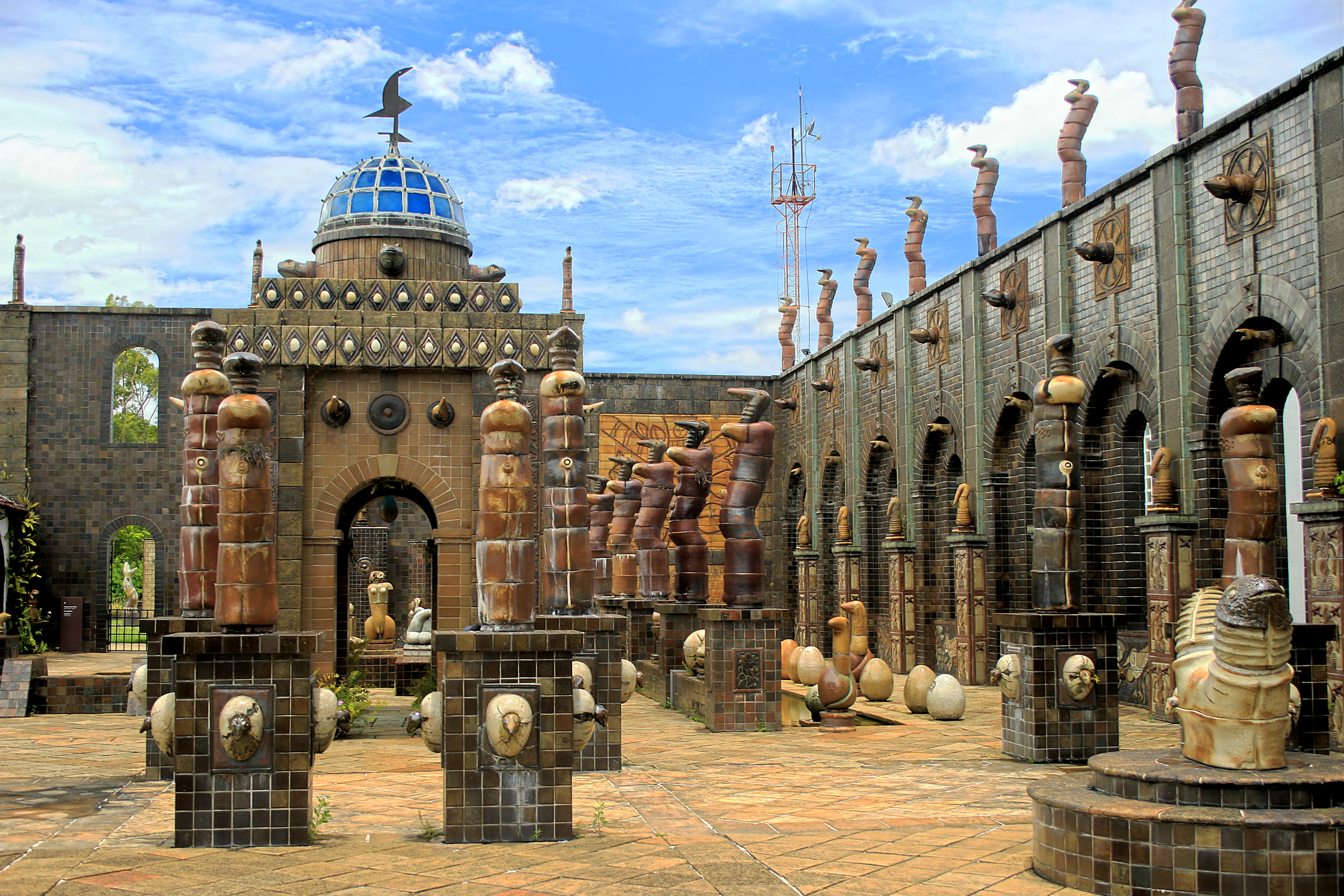
Francisco Brennand's Ceramic Workshop

The Museum of Pernambuco State is housed in a 19th-century mansion in Recife. Known locally as the "Museu do Estado de Pernambuco (MEPE)", it dates back to 1929. The museum comprises over 12 thousand pieces from Masters who portrayed the Colonial period and the Dutch invasion (1630), to 20th and 21st century pieces.

Kahal Zur Israel Synagogue: Sinagoga Kahal Zur Israel, the historic Recife synagogue in Recife Antigo, is the oldest in the Americas, dating to 1646. The original synagogue was destroyed, but a new one was built on site. In the early 21st century, it was restored for use as a museum. It is an important part of Pernambuco's historic patrimony. It was founded by Jews who settled in the Netherlands after expulsion from Spain and Portugal. They emigrated with the Dutch to "New Holland" when the Dutch invaded the northeastern portion of Brazilian lands occupied by the Portuguese. Moses Cohen Henriques led a Jewish 3000 contingent as part of the Dutch invasion. Isaac Aboab de Fonseca was brought from Amsterdam for the synagogue, serving as one of the first rabbis in the new world. When the Portuguese reconquered the land, these Sephardic Jews moved further north with the Dutch, and helped found "New Amsterdam" (now New York City) on Manhattan island in the United States. The first New York City synagogue was created in Lower Manhattan by the founders of the first synagogue in the New World in Recife. It later moved to the Upper West Side, where it is still called "the Portuguese and Spanish Synagogue".

Gilberto Freyre Foundation: This farmhouse from the 18th century was Gilberto Freyre's old residence. Artworks, arts and crafts, book collections and objects that belonged to the Pernambucan writer and sociologist are displayed here.

Ricardo Brennand Institute: Set up in a reproduction of a medieval-style castle, there is a collection of pieces from the period of Dutch rule in Recife, as well as daggers and armor from medieval Europe.

Recife City Museum: Located in a room in Cinco Pontas Fort (the five-pointed Fort), this museum houses pictures, reproductions of old paintings, and objects that encapsulate Recife since the period of Dutch rule.

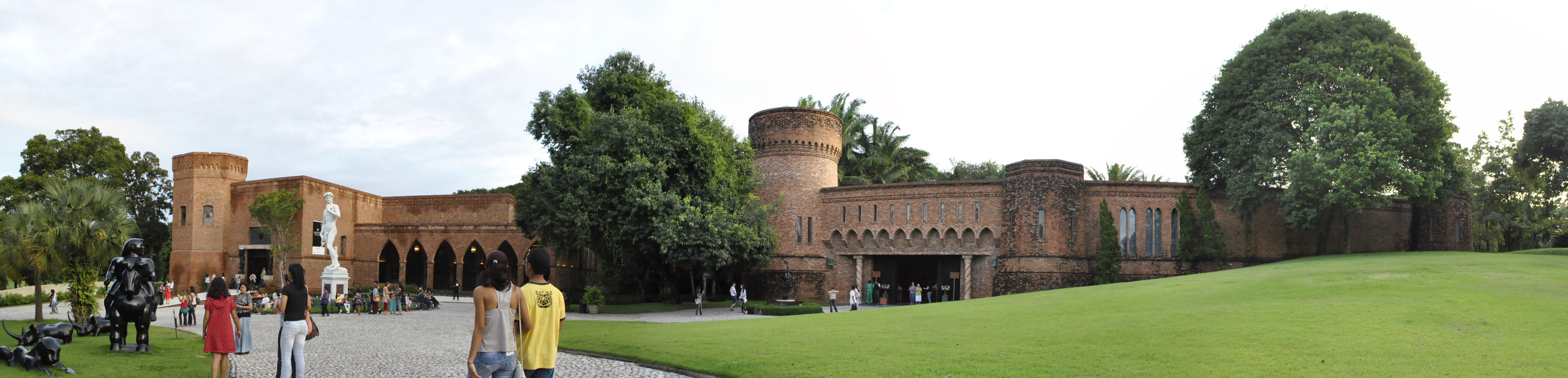
Ricardo Brennand Institute. The "best museum in South America".

=== Cinema ===
Also known as Recife Audiovisual Festival or Cine-PE, Recife Cinema Festival is a competitive film and audiovisual festival. It is dedicated to the Brazilian and state production of feature & short films; as well as videos and documentaries. It was founded in 1997 by Alfredo & Sandra Bertini, who have been the directors since then. Between 1997 and 2008, 1806 films have been shown (through either competitive applications or National & International invitations), of all types and genres, for a public of over 250,000.

Recife and consequently Pernambuco has a tradition in the Brazilian film making history. In the pioneer times of the Brazilian cinema emerged the Regional movements. One of those, was designated Ciclo de Recife (Recife cycle), between 1922 and 1931. Despite adverse conditions, during this cycle 13 feature films were produced in Recife (usually about drama & romance) and 7 documentary films (usually ordered by authorities to show their public works). Despite the pervasive influence of US and European cinemas in the silent film times, the Recife cycle was one of the most important and productive regional movements. One of the most important films was Aitaré da Praia, which is recognised for pioneering the rise of regional themes (1925). Other successful films were Retribuição (1923) and A Filha do Advogado (1926). Another important phase of the Pernambuco/Recife film history was in the 1970s with a movement called Super 8, often used for home videos and documentaries made by students, amateurs and aspirant film makers, due to the utilisation of 8 mm film, using the new technology released by Kodak.

=== Cuisine ===
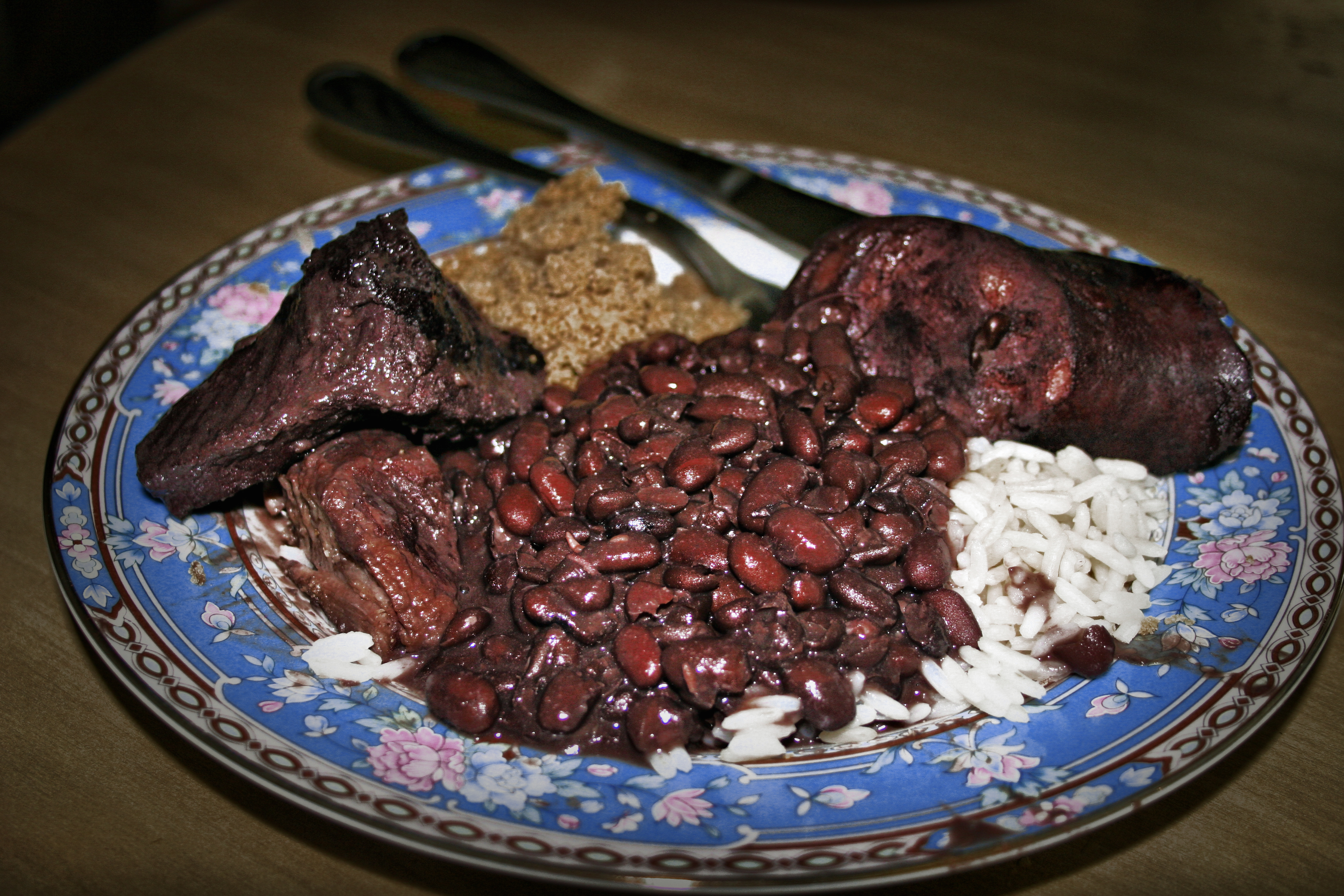
The Brazilian feijoada, considered the Brazil's national dish, was registered for the first time in Recife.

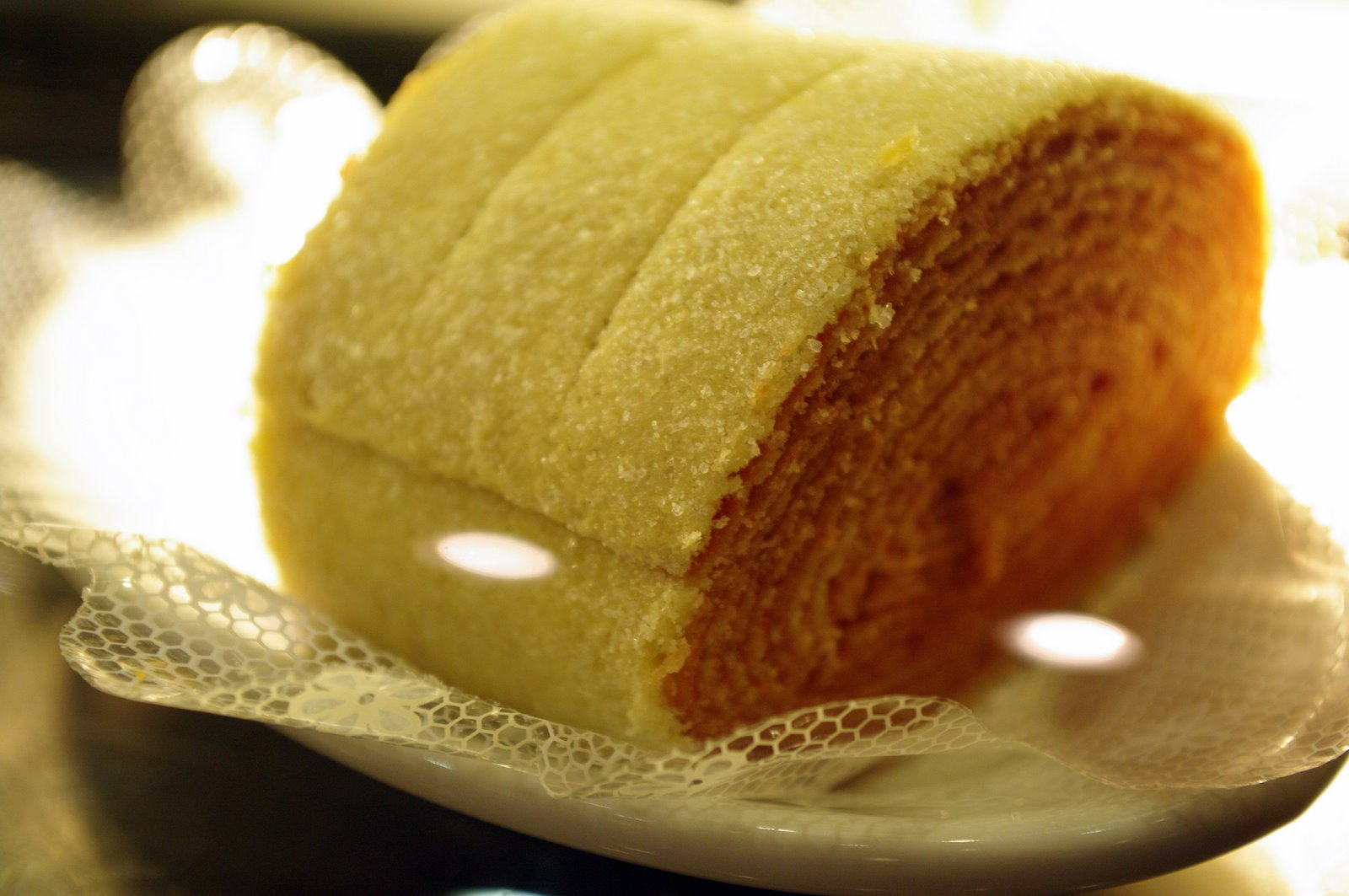
The bolo de rolo, one of the symbols of Pernambuco.

The typical regional main dishes include caldeirada (seafood stew with octopus cooked with various spices and coconut milk, which may be served with white beans or toasted cassava flour), feijoada Pernambucana (made with brown beans instead of black), sarapatel, buchada (goat stew), dobradinha (bean stew), roast goat, mão de vaca (cow's foot stew), Rabada (ox tail stew with manioc flour), cozido Pernambucano (beef stew), chambaril, galinha de cabidela (chicken in blood sauce), peixada Pernambucana (fish stew), macaxeira com charque (cassava with beef jerky), quiabada (okra with beef), feijão com arroz (rice and beans), and guaiamuns (giant crabs). One of the most traditional dishes, is Carne-de-sol (Sun-dried beef), which consists of beef dried in the sun and usually served with green beans.

For dessert, Recife offers bolo de rolo (cake roll), cake Souza Leão, and cartola (top hat cake) which consists of fried long bananas with cheese topped with cinnamon and sugar. The diversity continues for the breakfast as one can find cuscuz of sweet corn or manioc, yams and cassava with charque (corned beef or beef jerky), sweet potato, goiabada, fried long banana, mugunzá, regional fruits, bread, tapioca, rice pudding, porridge, yogurt, queijo coalho, corn bread, hominy and pamonha. Breakfast is often accompanied by coffee and/or milk and juices from regional fruits such as cashew, pineapple, mangoes, acerola, guava, passion fruit, umbu, hog plum, pitanga, jackfruit, orange, avocado and the regionally most famous caldo-de-cana and água-de-coco juices.

According to Abrasel (Brazilian Association of Bars & Restaurants), Recife has more than 1,700 bars and restaurants which serve regional (partially listed above), Brazilian (such as moqueca, bobó de camarão, açaí) and International dishes from all over the world, which has made it the first gastronomic centre of the Northeast and the third one in the whole country after São Paulo and Rio.

== Transportation ==
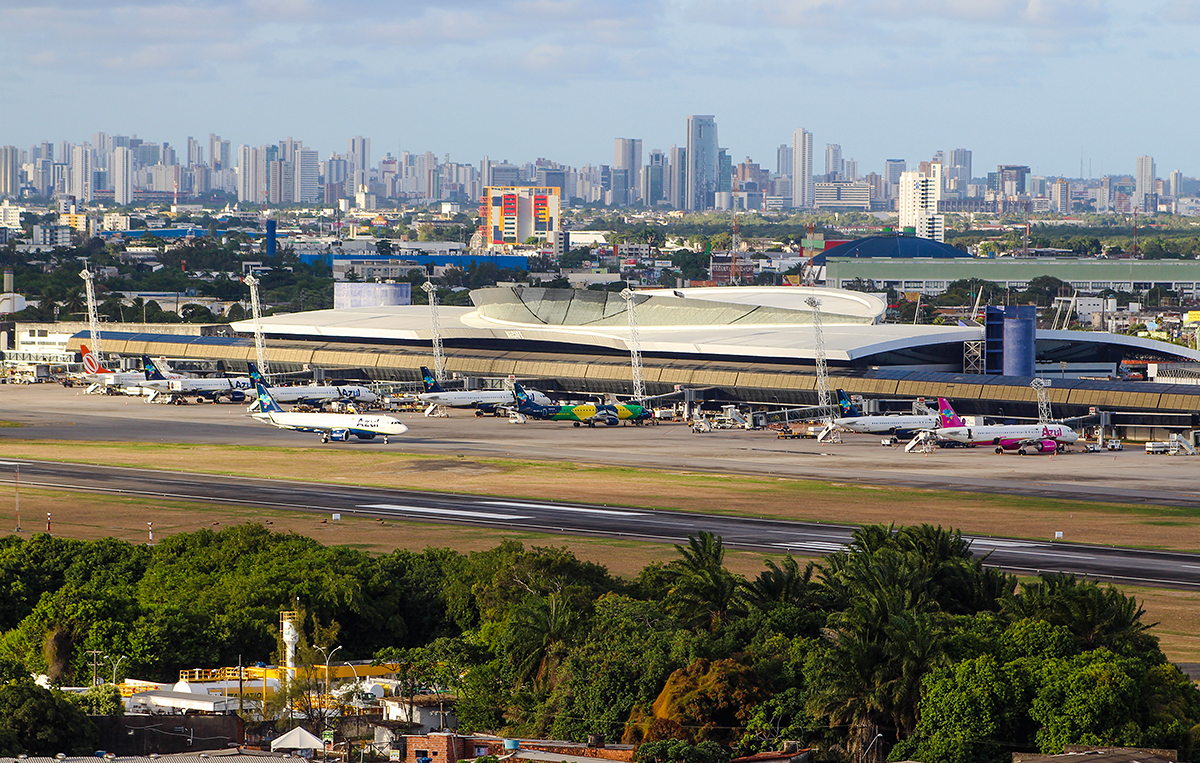
Recife Airport

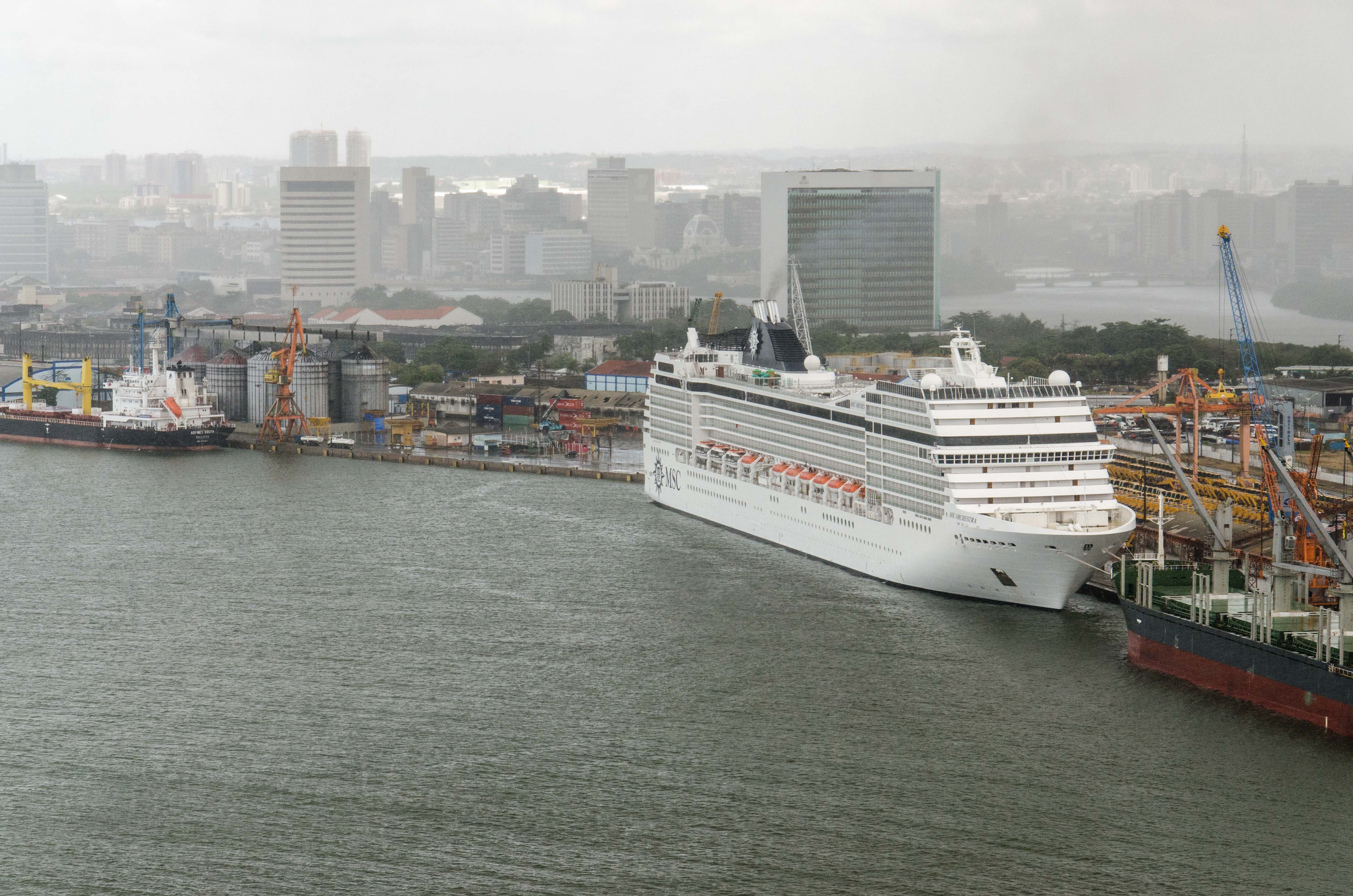
Recife port

=== International airport ===
Guararapes International Airport, also known as Gilberto Freyre International Airport, is the airport serving Recife and surrounding areas. It has been open in its newest structure since July 2004 and is 52,000 square m in area.

Recife Air Force Base - BARF, a base of the Brazilian Air Force, is located in Recife.

=== Ports ===
Suape port, is located in the administrative area of the small town of Ipojuca, inside the metropolitan region. Suape serves ships 365 days a year without any restrictions with regard to tidal schedules. The port moves over 8.4 million tons of cargo a year. More than 95 companies from almost all industries are already installed in Suape which includes a Petrobras Refinery, the largest shipbuilder in South American and a large petrochemical Company as well as many others. Port of Recife is located in the city of Recife. Road access to Port of Recife is accomplished, mainly, through the federal highways BR-232 (linking the interior of the state) and BR-101 (linking to other States to the north and the south of the State of Pernambuco). The main producing and consuming centres of the interior of the state and of the rest of the Northeast, are linked to Port by paved highways.

=== Metro ===
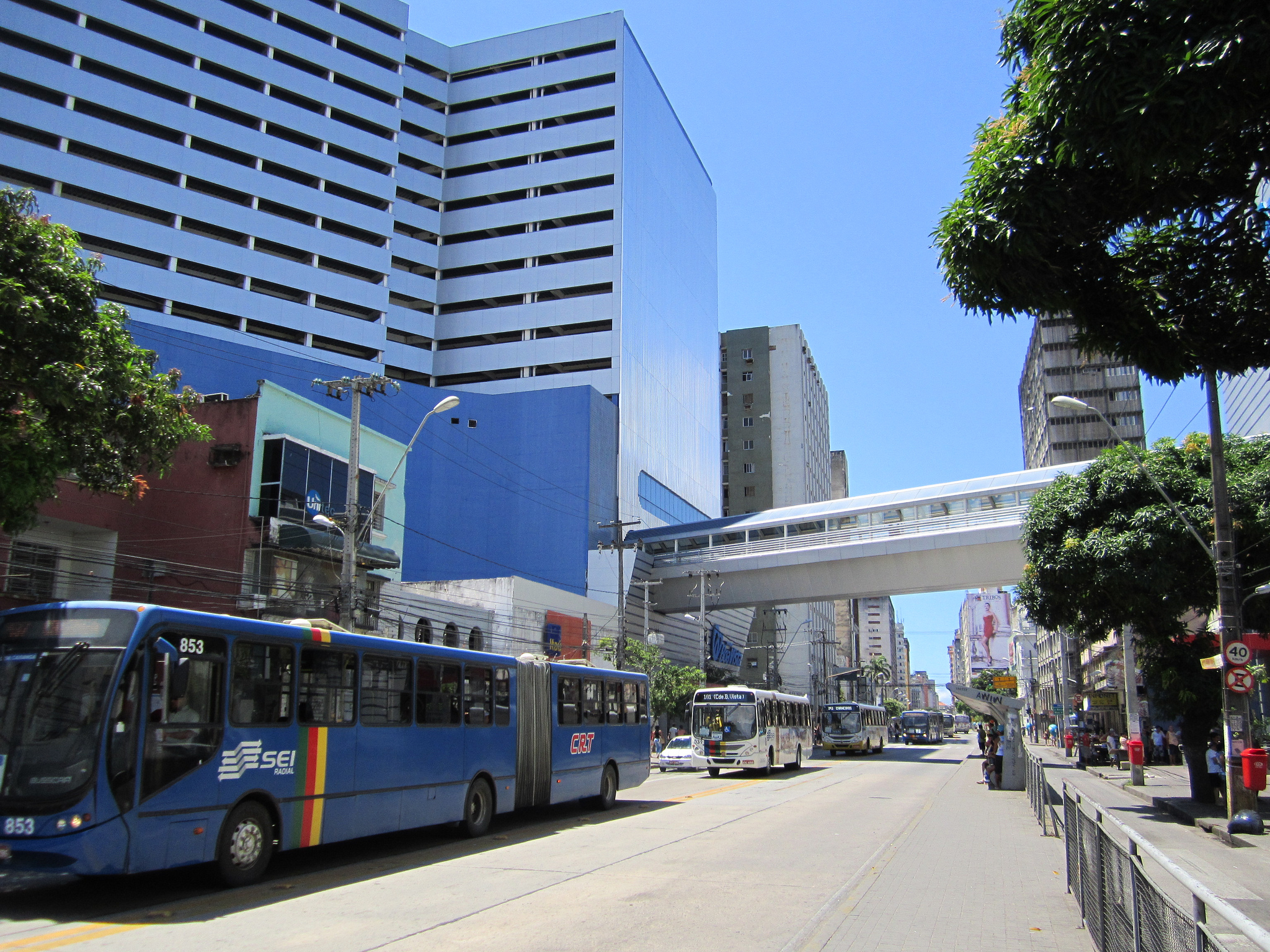
Bus lane in Recife.

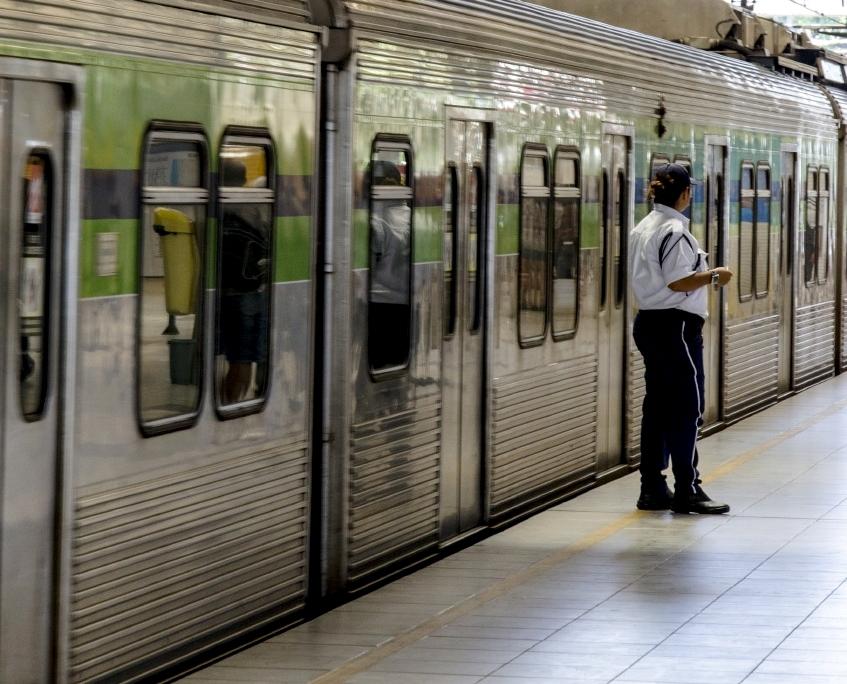
Recife Metro, the third largest in Brazil.

Recife Metro is one of the largest metro systems in Brazil. It reaches from Recife central station to Jaboatão, Timbi (Camaragibe) and Cajueiro Seco (Jaboatão dos Guararapes), being complemented by a light rail, with connections at Curado and Cajueiro Seco stations, which links Recife and Jaboatão to Cabo de Santo Agostinho.

This system is also integrated with bus terminals such as at Barro, Joana Bezerra and Tancredo Neves stations. It is possible to ride the metro and the connected bus line by purchasing one ticket only. In March 2009, Recife Metro completed an additional phase of expansion. The system now has 29 stations (18 integrated with buses), plus 9 light rail stations, and is 39.5 km (24.5 mi) long.

=== Fleet ===
According to Detran-PE (Transportation State Bureau Administrator) in 2009, the city of Recife had a total fleet of over 464,000 motor vehicles on its streets. 54,335 cargo vehicles, 318,520 passenger vehicles, 72,719 motorbikes, 14,142 others and 4,855 buses (split between private and public). These buses transport almost two million passengers daily in the metropolitan area, distributed between 17 local bus companies.

=== Highways ===
Recife metropolitan area is crossed by 3 main Federal highways:

- BR-101 North – Paraíba and Rio Grande do Norte;
- BR-101 South – Alagoas, Bahia, Minas Gerais, Rio de Janeiro, São Paulo, Paraná and Rio Grande do Sul;
- BR-232 West – Gravatá, Caruaru, Belo Jardim, Arcoverde, Salgueiro and Parnamirim;
- BR-408 NW – Carpina, Timbaúba and Campina Grande;

=== Public transportation statistics ===
The average amount of time people spend commuting with public transit in Recife, for example to and from work, on a weekday is 96 min. 34% of public transit riders, ride for more than 2 hours every day. The average amount of time people wait at a stop or station for public transit is 27 min, while 60% of riders wait for over 20 minutes on average every day. The average distance people usually ride in a single trip with public transit is 9 km, while 19% travel for over 12 km in a single direction.

== Neighborhoods ==
The city has 6 Political Administrative Regions (RPA), which contains all 94 neighborhoods:

RPA	Microregion	Neighborhoods	Map
City centre	1.1	Recife Antigo e Santo Amaro
City centre	1.2	Boa Vista, Cabanga, Ilha do Leite, Paissandu, Santo Antônio, São José e Soledade
City centre	1.3	Coelhos e Ilha Joana Bezerra
North	2.1	Arruda, Campina do Barreto, Campo Grande, Encruzilhada, Hipódromo, Peixinhos, Ponto de Parada, Rosarinho e Torreão
North	2.2	Água Fria, Alto Santa Terezinha, Bomba do Hemetério, Cajueiro, Fundão e Porto da Madeira
North	2.3	Beberibe, Dois Unidos e Linha do Tiro
Northwest	3.1	Aflitos, Alto do Mandu, Apipucos, Casa Amarela, Casa Forte, Derby, Dois Irmãos, Espinheiro, Graças, Jaqueira, Monteiro, Parnamirim, Poço da Panela, Santana, Tamarineira e Sítio dos Pintos
Northwest	3.2	Alto José Bonifácio, Alto José do Pinho, Mangabeira, Morro da Conceição e Vasco da Gama
Northwest	3.3	Brejo da Guabiraba, Brejo do Beberibe, Córrego do Jenipapo, Guabiraba, Macaxeira, Nova Descoberta, Passarinho e Pau Ferro
West	4.1	Cordeiro, Ilha do Retiro, Iputinga, Madalena, Prado, Torre e Zumbi
West	4.2	Engenho do Meio e Torrões
West	4.3	Caxangá, Cidade Universitária e Várzea
Southwest	5.1	Afogados, Bongi, Mangueira, Mustardinha e San Martin
Southwest	5.2	Areias, Caçote, Estância e Jiquiá
Southwest	5.3	Barro, Coqueiral, Curado, Jardim São Paulo, Sancho, Tejipió e Totó
South	6.1	Boa Viagem, Brasília Teimosa, Imbiribeira, Ipsep e Pina
South	6.2	Ibura e Jordão
South	6.3	Cohab

== Sports ==
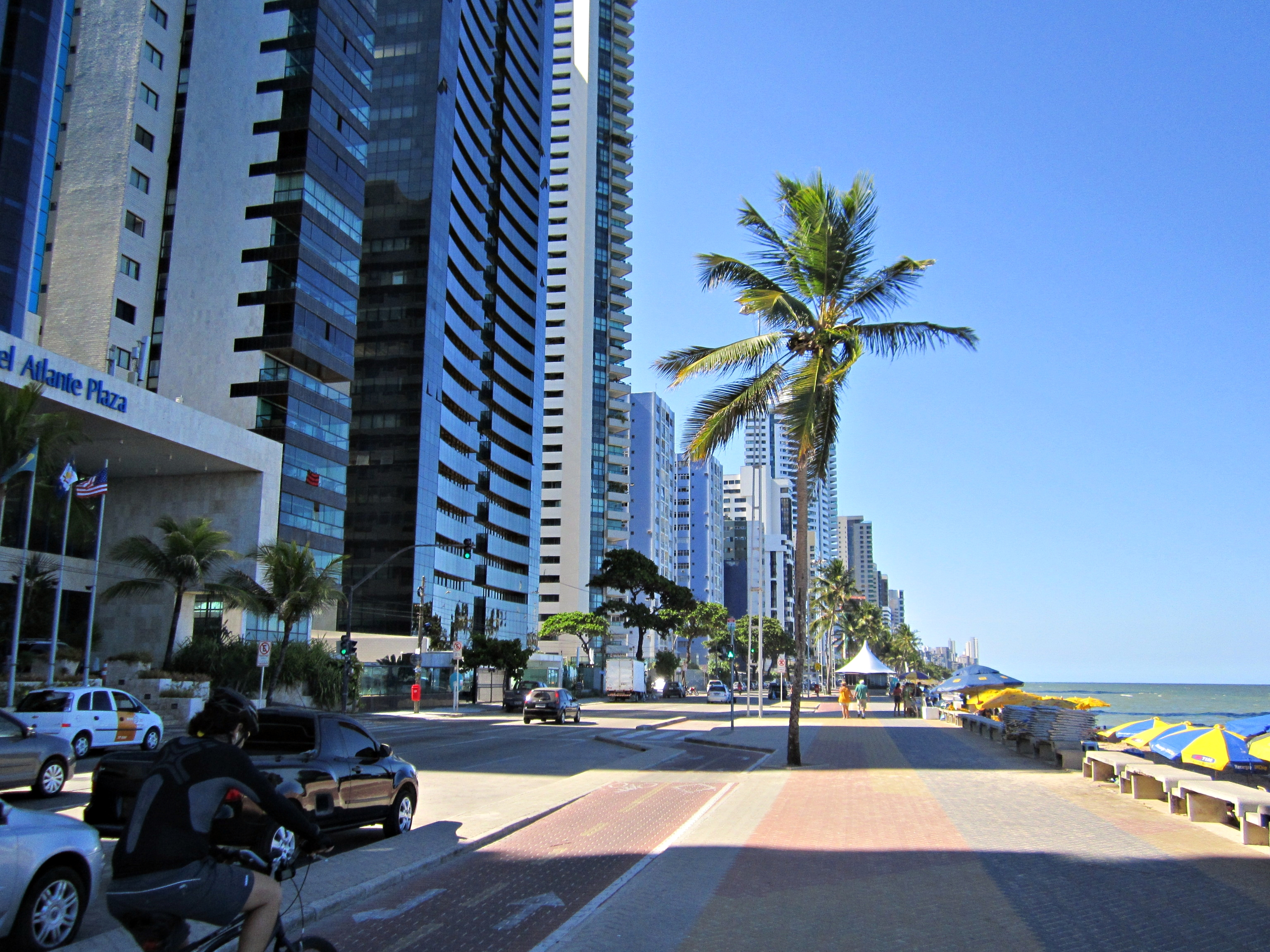
Bicycle path in Boa Viagem Beach.

Football in Pernambuco began in 1902, when English and Dutch sailors landed in Recife and played a game of football on the beach. The new game aroused the interest of the people of Pernambuco, and they soon started playing.

Recife provides visitors and residents with various sporting activities. There are several football clubs based in Recife, such as Sport Recife the current 2023 State Champion (43 times state champion and once national champion (1987) and Brazil's Cup champion (2008)), Santa Cruz (29 times state champion) and Náutico (23 times state champion and unique 6 consecutives). The Campeonato Pernambucano (Pernambuco's State Championship) is divided into Taça Revolução and Taça Confederação.

Also, the city has traditions in another sports as: Basketball, Hockey, Golf, Tenis, Table tennis, Volleyball, beach volley, Handball, Surf, Skateboard, Bodysurf, Swimning pool and Futsal. Provided by clubs such as: Nautico, Sport, Santa Cruz, Portuguese Club of Recife, Caxanga Golf & Country Club, Mauricio de Nassau University, School of Tenis Recife as others.

=== 1950 and 2014 FIFA World Cup ===
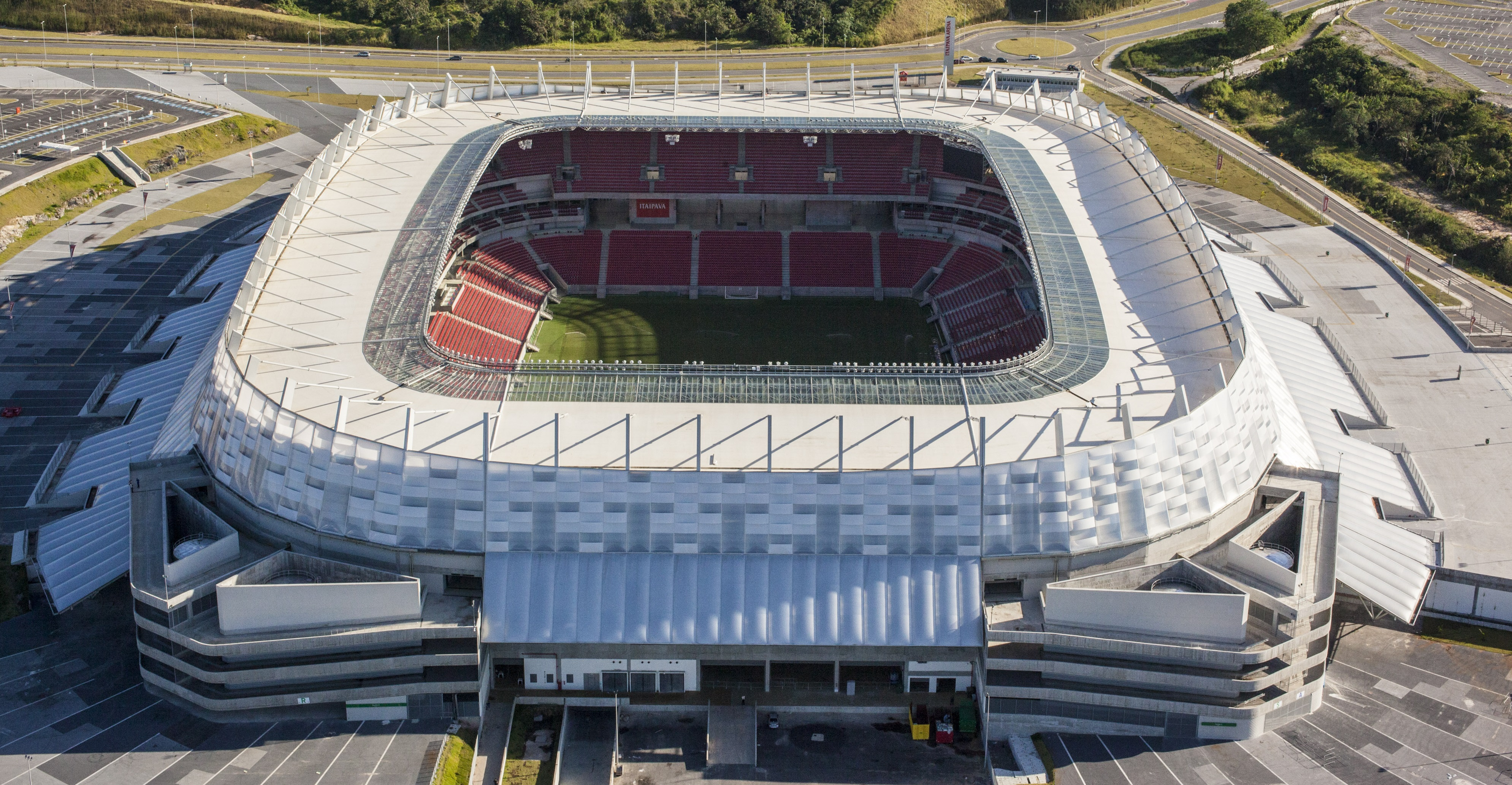
Arena Pernambuco, the stadium of the 2014 FIFA World Cup.

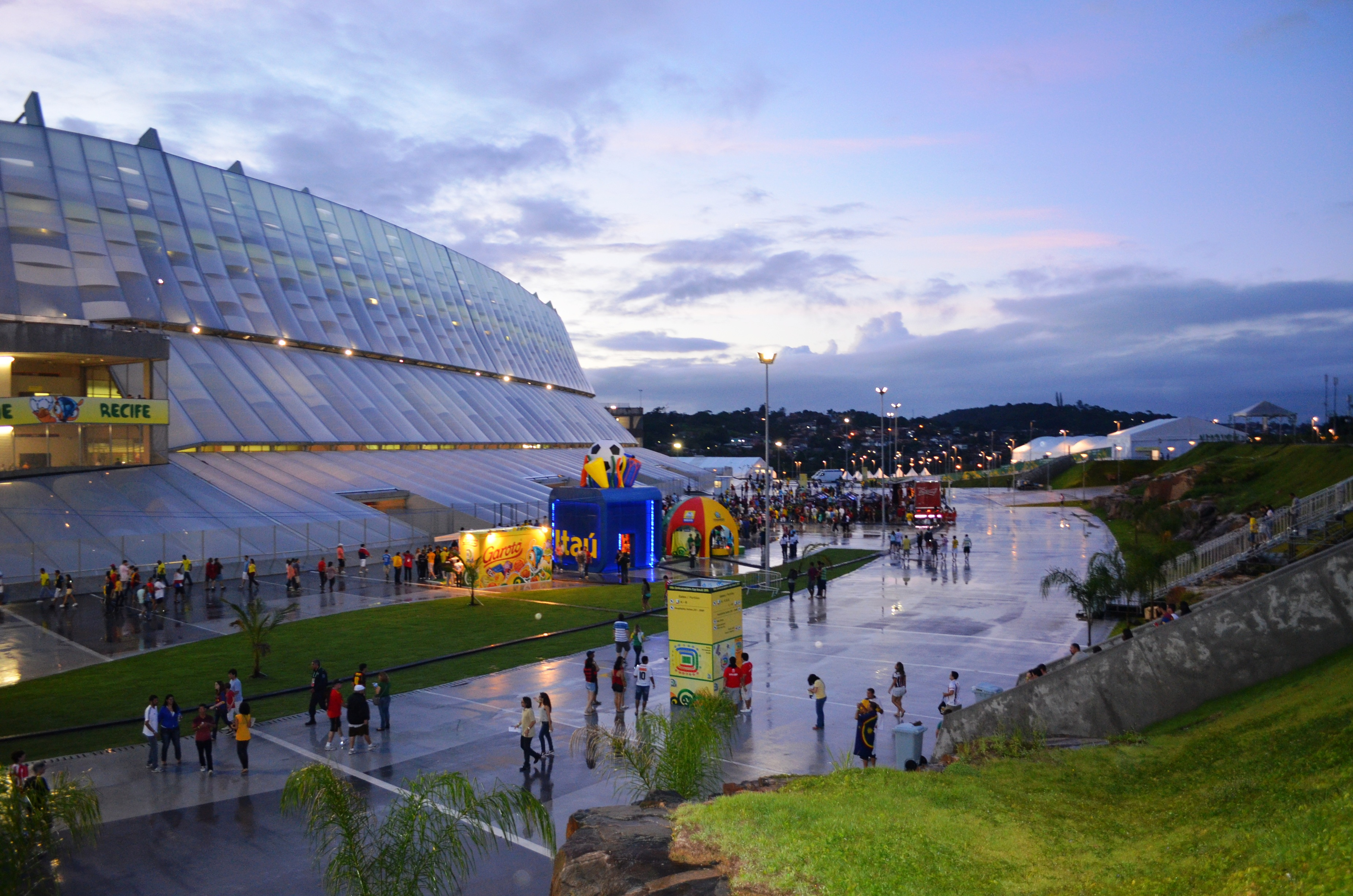
Access to the stadium.

Recife was one of the 12 cities chosen to host games for the 2014 FIFA World Cup, for which Brazil was the host nation. The Metropolitan Recife project consisted of a new Sports City constructed in São Lourenço da Mata in an intersection area near to Recife, Jaboatão dos Guararapes and Camaragibe. The new Sports complex is 19 km (12 mi) west of Recife city centre and 19 km (12 mi) from the Airport.

The sports complex 'City' was constructed with a new stadium with 45,000 seats, 9,000 flats, 6,000 car parking spaces, 1 hospital, 1 technical school, 1 shopping centre, 1 integrated metro/bus station and improvement of federal roads, all with an estimated cost of R$1.6 billion.

This was the second time Recife has been chosen to be one of the host cities of the FIFA World Cup. In 1950, Recife hosted just one game, between Chile and the United States, at Ilha do Retiro Stadium. At this time, it was the only city to represent the Northeast of Brazil.

== Social and environmental issues ==
Violence

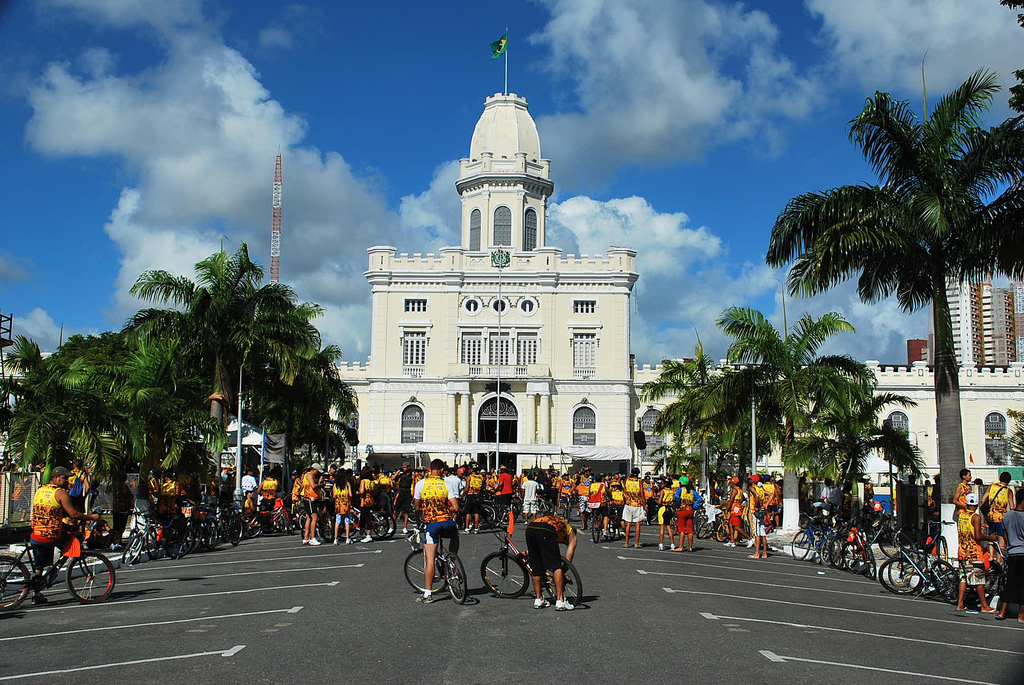
General Headquarters Command of Pernambuco Military Police.

In 2013, Recife had the 38th highest homicide rate in The Americas, after Detroit, New Orleans, Baltimore, San Juan and other cities.

PESP plan The State Governor Eduardo Campos introduced the PESP plan (Security state Plan – Plano Estadual de Segurança Pública) on May 2, 2009. This aimed to reduce homicides by 12% each year until they reached half of the previous rate. The plan was based on the fact that 60% of murders were committed by people related to criminal activities and embraces both prevention and correction.

Carnival security plan In 2007 ISS servers managed 50 Pelco Spectra PTZ cameras to capture all activity within areas of the city used for Carnival. Continued deployment of this project in Recife aimed to install over 1000 cameras in the city. Immediate statistics during the Carnival period indicated a reduction in violent crime of over 30%.

=== Recuperation program ===
UNICEF is an international development agency, which supports locally initiated projects with an emphasis on children. Recife offered an environment to utilise its rich cultural heritage to develop programs aimed at its most serious issues. One of the most hands-on projects was a radio program named "Jovens Comunicadores" (Communicating Youth). It trained a group of eighteen adolescents to produce a weekly radio program focusing on child labour. The program is recorded and sent to community radio stations, most of which are broadcast in the sugar cane area where many children work. Jovens Comunicadores advocates and lobbies against exploitation. All programs are produced and edited by teens. As a radio program, it also plays regional music, giving a boost to local culture.

"Criança Feliz" (Happy Child) had the same objective, eliminating child exploitation, but used a different approach. It was begun by a women's organisation and offered after-school activities with the goal of discouraging children and adolescents from working in sex tourism. Besides giving classes and training in computers, English, art, and karate, it also offered psychological services and group therapy. These combined services sought to equip children not only with skills but also a positive self-image and respect to not fall into prostitution. As all the kids came from very poor backgrounds, the financial pull of prostitution was very high. Criança Feliz worked at educating them about the high costs in the long term. This was a very interesting project, since it was actually a house with groups of kids divided into participating in different activities.

=== Shark attacks ===
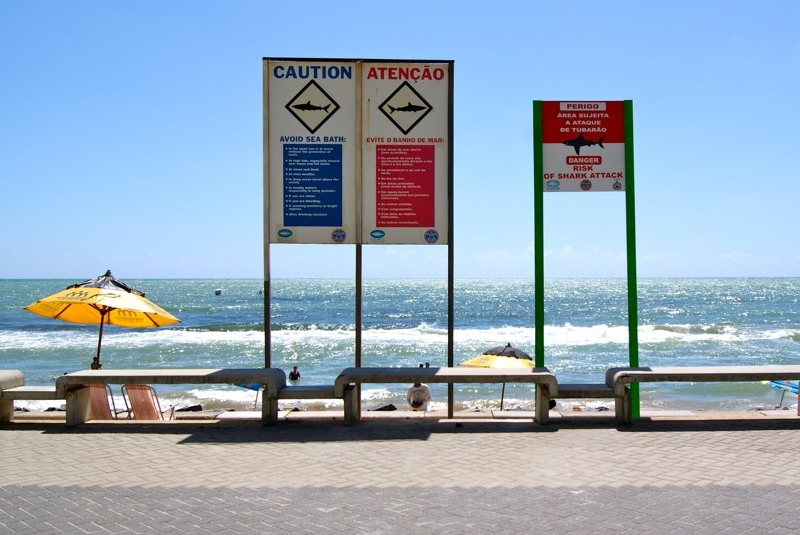
Signs warning of shark attacks at Boa Viagem Beach.

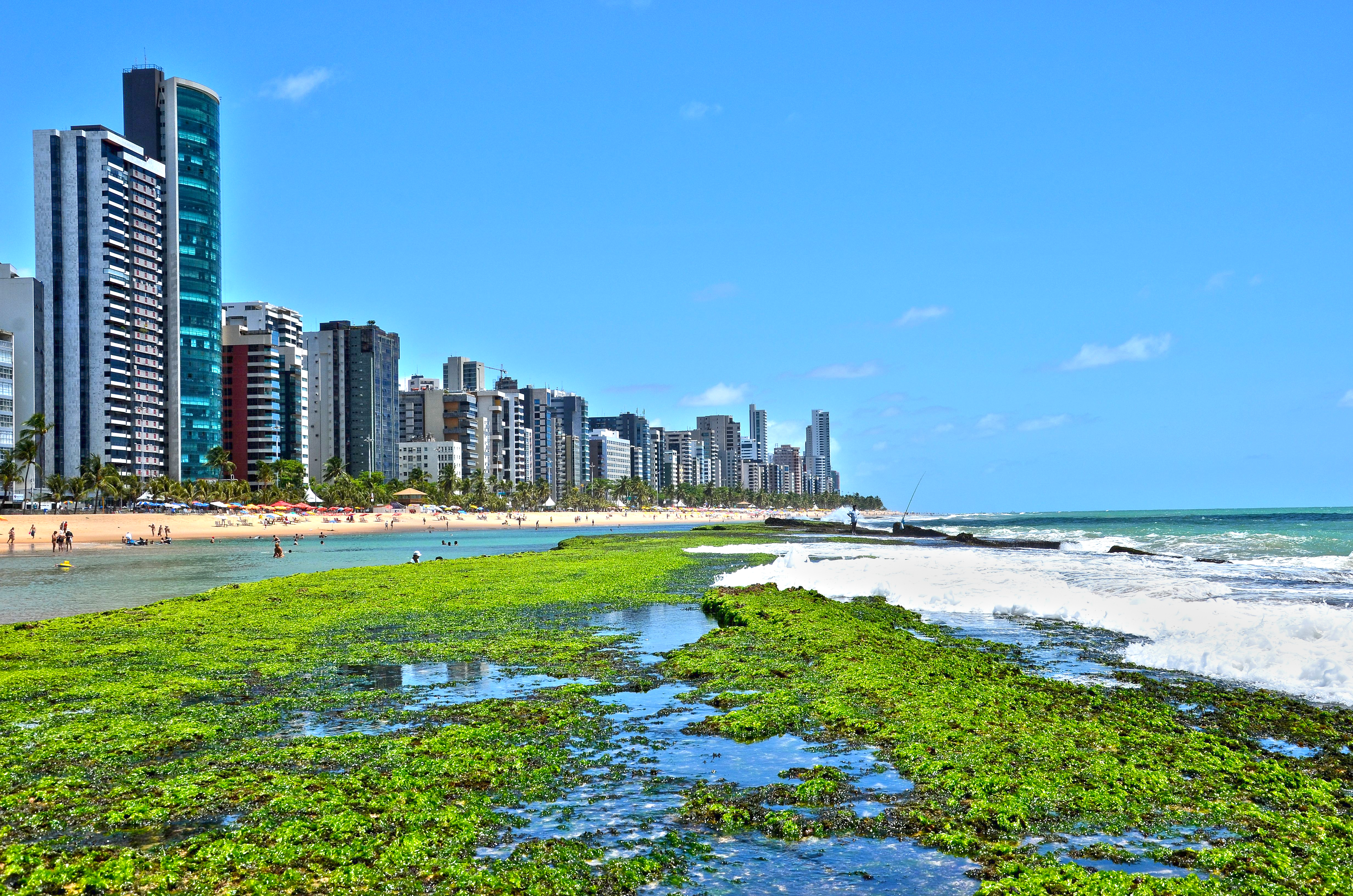
Natural pools – Boa Viagem Beach.

Shark attacks are a recurrent problem in Recife metropolitan area. They were addressed in the National Geographic Channel series Hunter Hunted in the episode "Shark Invasion." Surfing has been outlawed since 1995 on the urban beaches (Pina, Boa Viagem, Piedade, and Candeias) because of the risk the sport poses to its practitioners due to shark attacks. It is strongly recommended that bathers not climb over and swim beyond the reefs because of strong, unpredictable currents and the possible presence of bull sharks. Several beaches have messages alerting people to the danger of sharks.

Before the 1990s there had been virtually no attacks reported here. As of June 28, 1992, Recife began officially registering shark attacks on its beaches (mainly on the beach of Boa Viagem), and between 1992 and 2021 there were 64 shark attacks along a 20 km (12 mi) stretch of coast, 26 of them being fatal. The last deadly attack occurred on July 10, 2021. Other facts contribute to the appearance of sharks in the area of Boa Viagem Beach: the marine currents direct the animals for that stretch of 20 kilometers. A sand bank extends into the sea about a thousand meters from Recife's beaches. Between this long strip, with depth between 1 and 3 meters, and the beach a deep channel is formed (between 5 and 8 meters), which becomes a kind of refectory for sharks, since it attracts several species of rays, one of the prey of sharks. The presence of so many prey in that area makes the sharks stay closer to the beaches for longer and when the shark enters these channels, there is a great risk of contact with people. The Council for Shark Hazard Monitoring (Cemit), recommends the following precautions to prevent the attack of sharks on beaches in Recife: Avoid bathing between sunset and sunrise. It is in this period that sharks are most active. Do not enter the sea when the tide is full. Hungry sharks get across the reef if there is enough water flowing over them. Avoid swimming alone and when the water is cloudy. Do not enter the water above the waist and do not swim in the open sea.

In 1995, the Pernambuco government prohibited the practice of water sports on 32 km of coastline in the Metropolitan Region of Recife. This ban resulted in the reduction of incidents with sharks thereafter.

The state-funded investigation has focused on the long-term ecological effects of the new port of Suape. Based on its findings, local human rights lawyers are considering a symbolic legal challenge to the State of Pernambuco, with the aim of securing compensation for the victims of attacks.

== Consular representations ==
The following countries have consular representations in Recife:

- Argentina (Consulate)
- Mexico (Vice-Consulate)
- China (Consulate-General)
- Serbia (Consulate-General)
- Iceland (Vice-Consulate)
- France (Consulate-General)
- Germany (Consulate-General)
- Italy (Consulate)
- Japan (Consulate-General)
- Bolivia (Consulate)
- Portugal (Vice-Consulate)
- United Kingdom (Consulate-General)
- United States (Consulate-General)
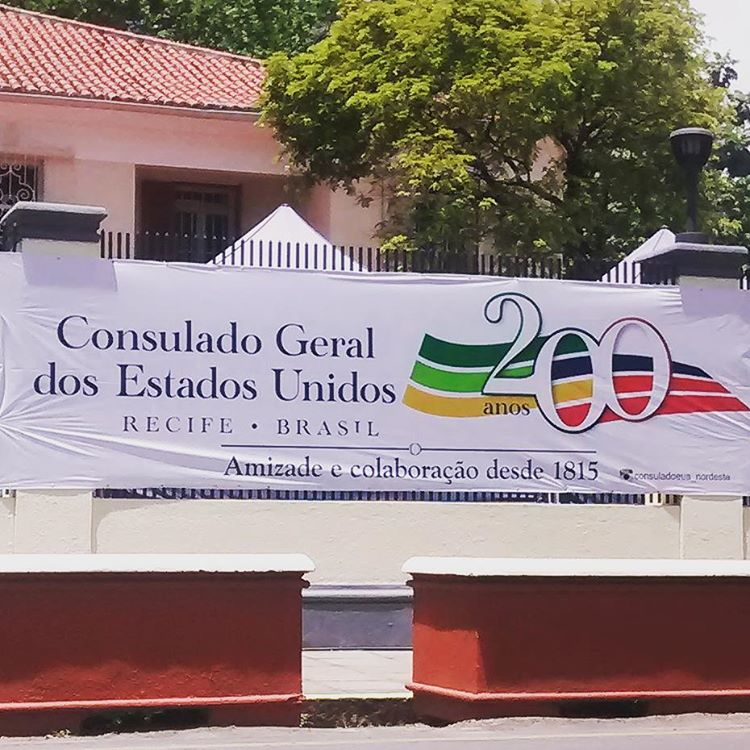
Consulate-General of the United States

== International relations ==
=== Twin towns – sister cities ===
Recife is twinned with:

- Chengdu, China
- Guangzhou, China
- Porto, Portugal

=== Partner cities ===
In addition to its twin towns, Recife also cooperates with:

- Nantes, France
