= Timeline of Recife =

Coordinates: 8.05°S 34.9°W

The following is a timeline of the history of the city of Recife, Pernambuco, Brazil.

== Prior to 20th century ==
- 1535 - Olinda settlement established by Duarte Coelho.
- 1595 - Capture of Recife by English privateer James Lancaster.
- 1630 - Siege of Recife by Dutch forces.
- 1637 - Kahal Zur Israel Synagogue built.
- 1649 - Second Battle of Guararapes
- 1654 - Recapture of Recife by Portuguese forces.
- 1667 - Igreja de Nossa Senhora do Rosário dos Pretos (Recife) (church) established (approximate date).
- 1710 - War of the Mascates begins.
- 1720 - Igreja Madre de Deus (Recife) (church) built.
- 1767 - Basilica and Convent of Nossa Senhora do Carmo, Recife (church) built.
- 1817 - Pernambucan revolt.
- 1824 - Confederation of the Equator
- 1825 - Diário de Pernambuco newspaper begins publication.
- 1848 - Praieira revolt.
- 1850 - Santa Isabel Theater opens.
- 1855 - Malakoff Tower built.
- 1861 - Hospital Pedro II completed.
- 1862 - Archeological, Historic and Geographic Institute of Pernambuco founded.
- 1866 - Provincial Assembly palace built.
- 1872 - Population: 116,671.
- 1875 - Mercado de São José built.

== 20th century ==
- 1901 - Clube Náutico Capibaribe (sports club) formed.
- 1904 - Population: 186,000.
- 1905 - Sport Club do Recife formed.
- 1909 - Federal Institute of Pernambuco founded.
- 1914 - Santa Cruz Futebol Clube formed.
- 1917 - Labor strike.
- 1919 - Jornal do Commercio (Recife) newspaper begins publication.
- 1920 - Population: 238,843.
- 1929 - Museum of the State of Pernambuco opens.
- 1938 - Marco Zero (milestone) installed in Praça Rio Branco (Recife).
- 1939
  - Jardim Zoobotânico de Dois Irmãos (zoo) established.
  - Estádio dos Aflitos (stadium) opens.
- 1940 - Population: 348,424.
- 1946 - Federal University of Pernambuco established.
- 1950 - Population: 512,370.
- 1958 - Recife Symphony founded.
- 1960 - Population: 788,336.
- 1966 - University of Pernambuco established.
- 1970 - Population: 1,046,454.
- 1972 - Estádio do Arruda (stadium) opens.
- 1978 - Galo da Madrugada (parade) begins.
- 1985 - Recife Metro begins operating.
- 1986 - Jarbas Vasconcelos becomes mayor.
- 1991 - Population: 1,296,995.
- 1993 - Population: 1,314,857 (estimate).
- 1997 - Recife Cinema Festival begins.
- 2000 - Population: 1,422,905.

== 21st century ==
- 2001 - João Paulo Lima e Silva becomes mayor.
- 2002 - Ricardo Brennand Institute established.
- 2004 - Recife/Guararapes–Gilberto Freyre International Airport terminal built.
- 2008 - Grande Recife Consórcio de Transporte Metropolitano established.
- 2009 - João da Costa Bezerra Filho becomes mayor.
- 2010 - Population: 1,546,516.
- 2011 - 13 July: Airplane crash in Boa Viagem.
- 2012 - 7 October: Recife 2012 municipal election held.
- 2013
  - 1 January: Geraldo Júlio becomes mayor.
  - 22 May: Arena Pernambuco opens in nearby São Lourenço da Mata.
- 2014 - Rádio Globo Recife begins broadcasting.
- 2016 - 2 October: Recife 2016 municipal election held.
- 2021 - 1 January: João Henrique Campos becomes mayor.
- 2022 - Population: 1,488,920.

== See also ==
- Recife history
- History of Recife
- List of mayors of Recife
- History of Pernambuco

== Bibliography ==
=== in English ===
- "Recife" . Encyclopædia Britannica. Vol. 22 (11th ed.). 1910. pp. 953–954.
- Ernst B. Filsinger (1922), "Brazil: Pernambuco (Recife)", Commercial Travelers' Guide to Latin America, Washington, DC: Government Printing Office

=== in Portuguese ===
- J.C.R. Milliet de Saint-Adolphe (1863), "Recife", Diccionario geographico, historico e descriptivo, do imperio do Brazil (in Portuguese), Paris: J. P. Aillaud, hdl:2027/wu.89006303077 – via HathiTrust
- Gilberto Freyre (1934). Guia Prático, Histórico e Sentimental da Cidade do Recife (in Portuguese).
