= List of museums in Pernambuco =

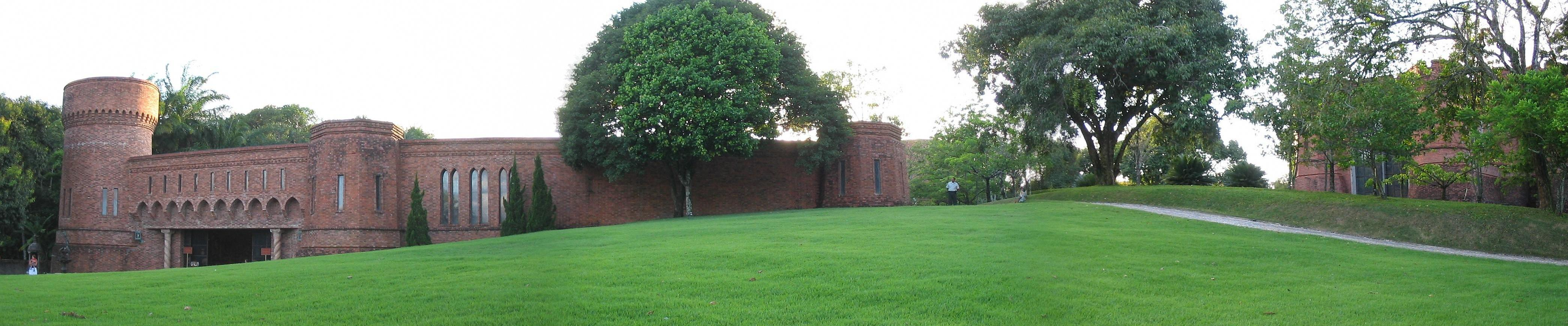
Ricardo Brennand Institute Museum in Recife.

Below is a list of museums in Pernambuco, Brazil.

== Recife museums ==
The Museum of Pernambuco State (Museu do Estado de Pernambuco or MEPE) Historical and anthropological museum housed in a 19th-century mansion (Lord Beberibe) in Recife, Capital of Pernambuco state, the "Museu do Estado de Pernambuco (MEPE)" dates back to 1929. From Masters who portrayed the Colonial period, as well as the Dutch invasion (1630) to 20th and 21st century, the museum comprises over 12 thousand art pieces and include panels about the battles of Monte Guararapes and Tabocas. Periodically the museum hosts the "Salão de Arte Contemporânea de Pernambuco" (Contemporary Art Exhibition) when emerging artists are selected to represent the new run of local professionals who will help to maintain and shape the new profile of the local art scenery.

- 960, Rui Barbosa Avenue, Graças

Tuesday through Friday 9 am – 5 pm; Saturday and Sunday 2–5 pm

Kahal Zur Israel Synagogue Kahal Zur Israel The historic Recife synagogue in the Recife Antigo, --Old Recife—is the oldest one in the Americas, dating back to the 17th century. Reopened recently, Kahal is part of the Pernambuco historic patrimony. It was founded by Jews who were once expelled from Portugal and settled in the Netherlands. Some of those Jews immigrated to "New Holland" when the Dutch invaded the Northeastern portion of Brazilian lands occupied by the Portuguese. When the Portuguese, helped by Portuguese-Brazilians, reconquered the land, Recife Portuguese-Brazilian Jews moved further north with the Dutch, whose trips Jews patronized, where "New Amsterdam" was founded on Manhattan island. Thus, the first New York City synagogue was created by the founders of the first synagogue in the New World, in lower Manhattan. It later moved to the Upper West Side, where it is still called "The Portuguese and Spanish Synagogue."

- Bom Jesus street, Recife Antigo

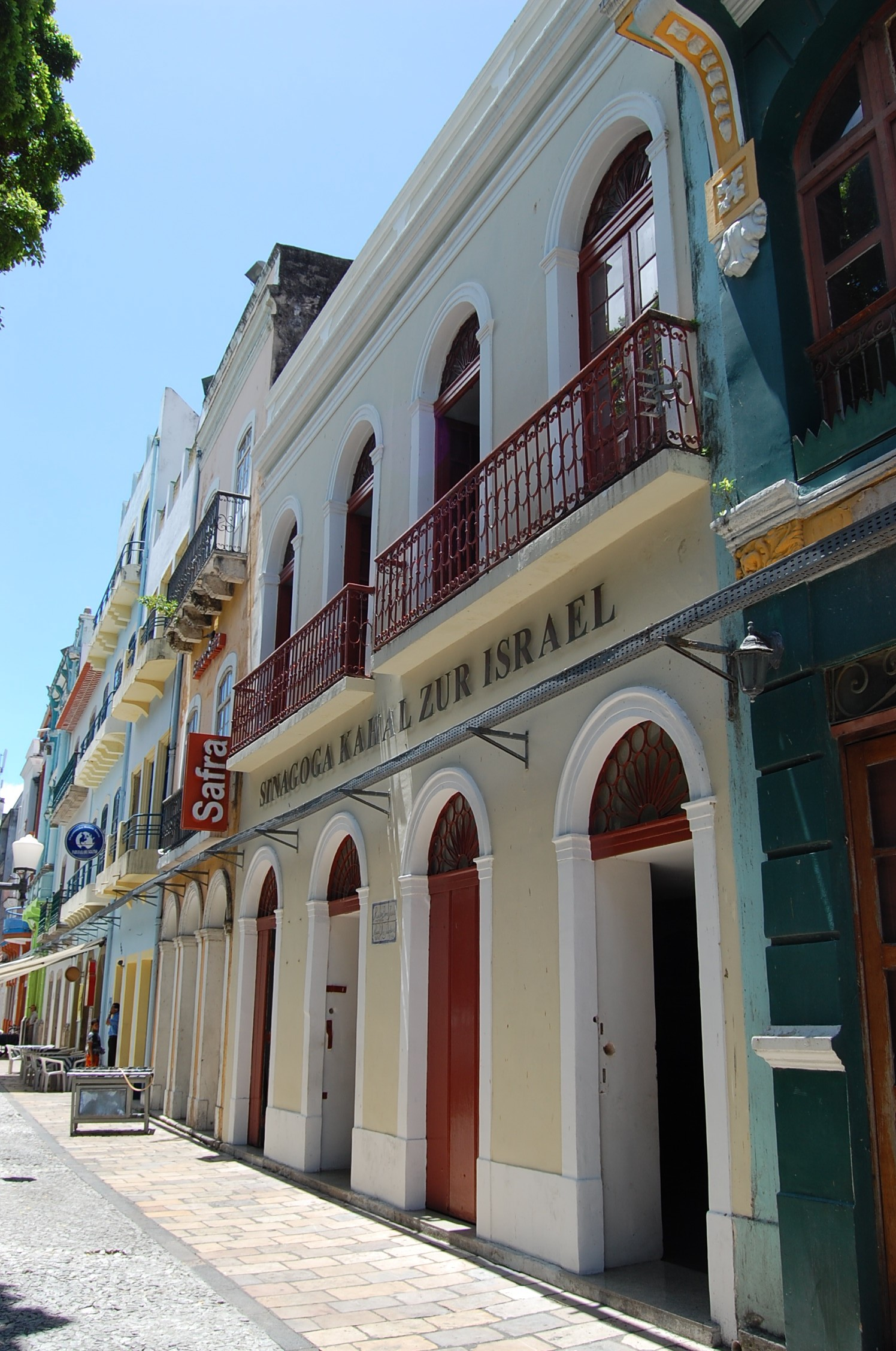
Kahal Zur Israel Synagogue in the city.

Francisco Brennand Ceramic Workshop (Atêlier de Cerâmica)

Francisco Brennand, one of the most important names in contemporary sculptures in Brazil, displays around 2000 pieces of his ceramic works in enormous open sheds, between monuments, gardens and in the midst of an Atlantic forest reserve in Varzea neighborhood in Recife. Many of his works elaborate on abstract beings, that are sensuality symbols. Several anatomic parts are in his studies, mainly from the female body. He also uses ceramic to create floor and wall tiles as well as bricks for construction. His studio is set in an old brick factory that belonged to the sculptor's English family. Some of his work is an original and creative miscellaneous between the European-Amerindian-African-Egyptian cultures.

- Engenho S. Joǎo, Varzea

Monday through Friday - 8 am – 5 pm

Museum of the Man of the Northeastern (Museu do Homem do Nordeste) The broad collection describes Pernambuco's culture starting from three main themes: the sugar-cane production cycle, the northeastern man's life style and the folkloric and religious manifestations. Explore the culture heritage of Indian, Portuguese and African in the formation of the Northeast people. Examples since Mocambos, (poor clay houses) until the big Lord house (casa grande) and the Senzala (large slaves dormitory) are illustrated in this museum. Also, objects of worship, popular cloth dolls and ceramic from regional artists such as Vitalino, Zé Caboclo, Zé Rodrigues and anonymous people as well. All this makes up the body of the richest museum of cultural anthropology in Brazil.

- 2187, 17 Agosto Avenue, Casa Forte

Tuesday through Friday 8:30 am – 5 pm; Saturday and Sunday 1–5 pm

Gilberto Freyre Foundation This space keeps alive the memory of the Master of Apipucos, the writer and sociologist Gilberto Freyre(1900/87), immortalized between other major works in Casa Grande e Senzala. In the house museum, a 19th-century mansion, visitors can check the ecological site (living museum with pitangueiras trails and pau-Brazil trails). In addition to a rich library, with books collections, pictures, paintings, sculptures, crafts and personal objects that belonged to the sociologist.

- 320 Dois Irmaos street, Apipucos

Monday through Friday 9 am – 5 pm

Recife City Museum Set up in a room in Cinco Pontas Fort, it houses pictures, reproductions of old paintings (painted by Franz Post) and objects that describe Recife since the period of Dutch rule, such as over than one thousand antique photos, tableware, Portuguese and French tiles, among other pieces.

- Cinco Pontas Fort, S. José

Tuesday through Friday 8 am – 6 pm; Saturday and Sunday 1–5 pm

Abolition Museum (Museu da Abolição) Is installed in a typical construction designated Engenho (Large owner of slaves house) called Great Magdalene House. It was inaugurated in 1983 and has on display in his memorial hall, several objects relating to the slavature in the 18th and 19th centuries. It has mini-auditorium and amphitheater where are developed educational and cultural programs. It's an African-Brazilian cultural reference.

- 150, Benfica street, Madalena

Monday through Friday 8 am – 12 noon and 1–5 pm

Museum of Modern Art Aloisio Magalhães (Portuguese: Museu de Arte Moderna Aloisio Magalhães, MAMAM) This museum is always getting new exhibitions of Brazilian and international artists as Rodin and Baskiat.

- 265, Aurora street, Boa Vista

Tuesday through Sunday - 12am/6pm

Ricardo Brennand Institute

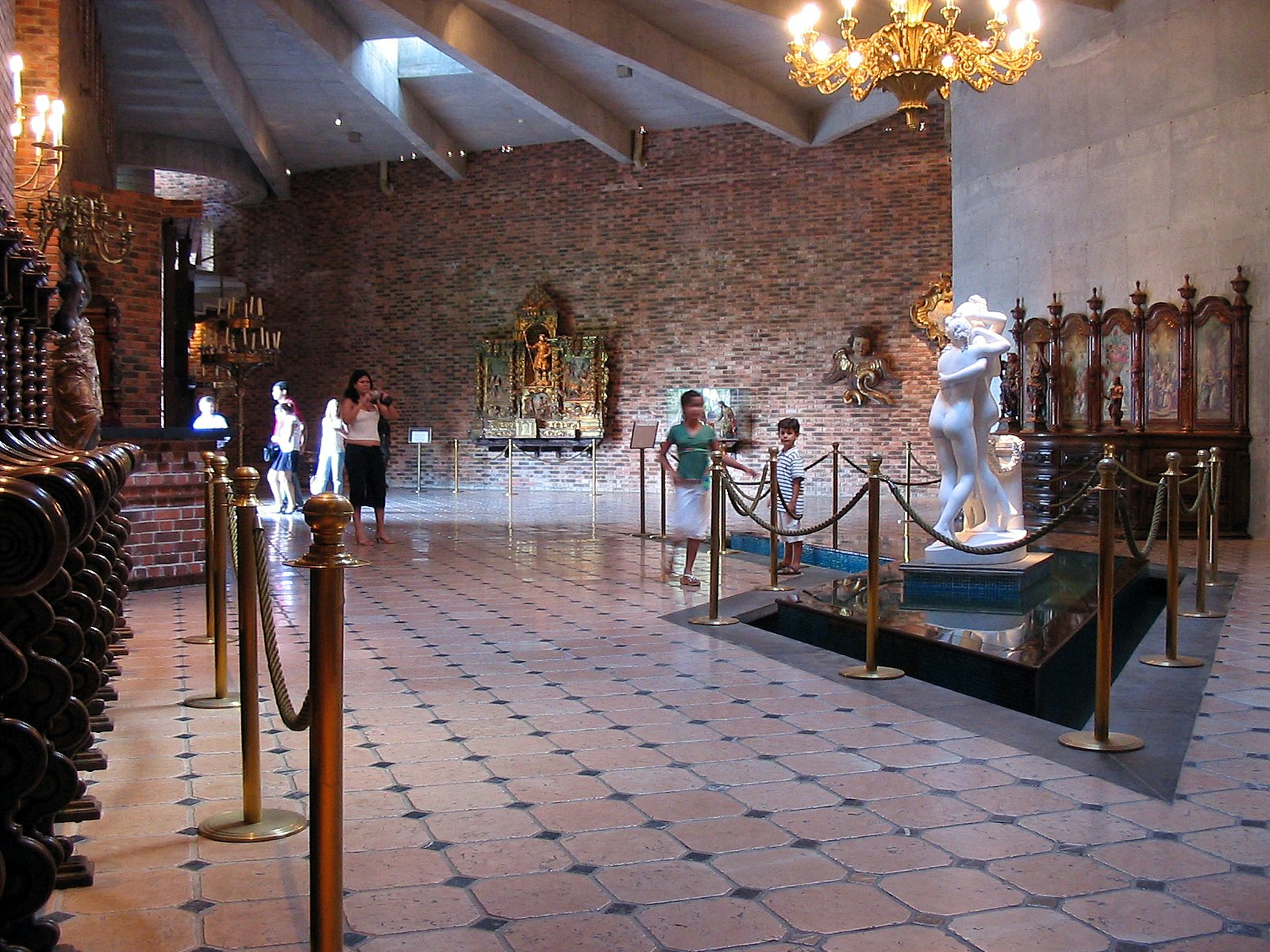
Pinacoteca (Art Hall) of IRB

Set up in a building that reproduces a castle in medieval style, houses a museum, art gallery and library. Was designed by the collector Ricardo Brennand. The Institute has collection of pieces (paintings, objects, daggers, armors, etc.) from different backgrounds covering since the Medieval Europe (16th century), the Dutch domination period in Recife (17th century) until the Brazil of the 19th century.

- Varzea - Recife

Image and Sound Museum (MISPE) (Museu da Imagem e do Som) This space is dedicated to research. It has a large collection of pieces with over than four thousands between photos, posters, discs, tapes, videos and paintings. Also, organizes constantly exhibitions such as the record of the passage of the Zepellin and the cycle of super 8 in Pernambuco. The museum is under responsibility of the journalist and movie critic Celso Marconi.

- 379, Aurora street, Boa Vista

Monday through Friday - 8am/2pm

Natural Sciences Museum (Museu de Ciências Naturais) Large collection of animals, through mammals, reptiles and insects. It also contains a botanical garden and an Atlantic forest reserve with 387 ha.

- Park and Zoo Dois Irmãos, Recife

Tuesday through Sunday - 8 am – 5 pm

Popular Art Museum (MAP - Museu de Arte Popular) Collection with many pieces of objects (usually clay and ceramics) from artists of the entire northeast of Brazil (including Mestre Vitalino, Louco, Maria Amélia, Nhô Caboclo, Judite, Ana das Carrancas, Zé Caboclo and Benedito). The museum works mainly with Folk art, Art Brut and Intuitive/Outsider art of Brazil from the 60's to today.

- S. Pedro square, S. José.

Monday through Friday - 8 am – 5 pm

Train Museum (Museu do Trem) The museum has photos and collection of parts and tools that were used in the past century, for the construction of the Northeast Railroad.

- Visconde de Maua square, central station, S. José

Monday through Friday 9 am – 12 noon and 2–5 pm; Saturday through Sunday 2–5 pm

Murillo la Greca Museum It has a collection of more than a thousand drawings, two hundreds paintings and many objects; which shows the rejection conscious of the painter Murillo la Greca. He has studied in Naples with the Fine Arts Professor Emilio Notte.

- 366, Leonardo Cavalcante street, Parnamirim

Monday through Friday - 8 am – 5 pm

Malakoff Tower Cultural Center (Centro cultural Torre Malakoff)

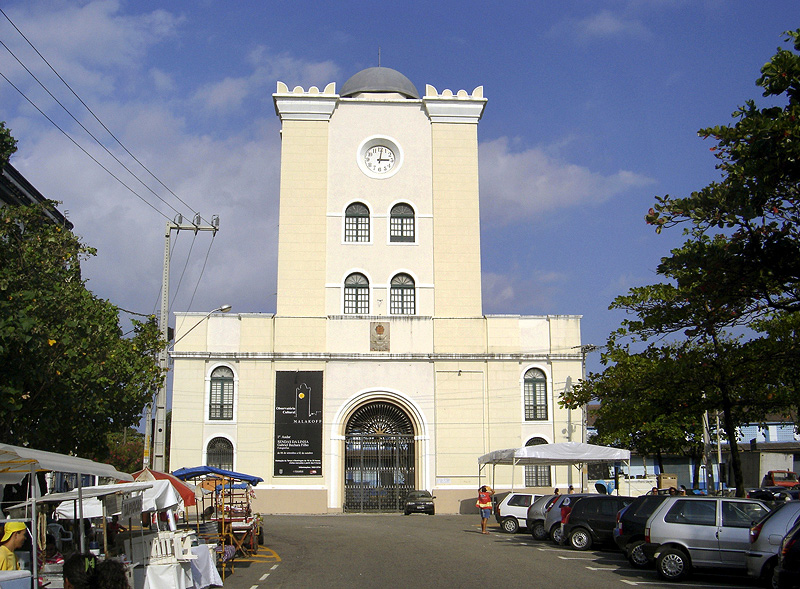
Malakoff Tower

Cultural area with proposal involving science, art and technology. Works with exhibitions of photos, comics, among others and it is used for popular manifestations as well. The tower was renovated in 1999 keeping the old features of the Tunisian style monument, which was built between 1835 and 1855. It was a monument constructed to be used as an observatory. Has been registered as a Historical Patrimony and was named after a similar monument on Crimean peninsula, used as a defense center for Sebastopol on the Crimean war.

- Arsenal da Marinha square, Recife Antigo

Tuesday through Sunday - 3–8:00pm

Military Museum of Brum Fort (Museu Militar do Forte de Brum) Created in 1985, the museum houses Portuguese and English cannons, weapons, pictures, objects that has marked the action of the Brazilian Air Force in the second World War. The Forte de São João Batista do Brum is a military fort built in the 17th century.

- Comunidade Luso-Brasileira square, Recife

Tuesday through Friday - 9 am – 4:30 pm; Saturday through Sunday 1:30–5pm

Currencies Museum (Museu de Valores) Located in the Central Bank of Brazil office in Recife, exhibits notes/bills and coins issued in the country since the creation of the bank. The museum in partnership with the Federal University of Pernambuco in addition to more than seven thousands coins has acquired a collection with two hundred international currencies, set in a room designated Currencies of the World.

- 1259, Aurora street, Santo Amaro

Monday through Friday - 9 am – 4 pm

Carnival House (Casa do Carnaval) Works as a source of research and information about the Carnival in Recife. The club has a vast collection of discs and materials about the many carnivals associations of the city.

- 52, S. Pedro square, S. José

Monday through Friday - 9 am – 7 pm

Francisco Brennand Sculptures Park (Parque de Esculturas)

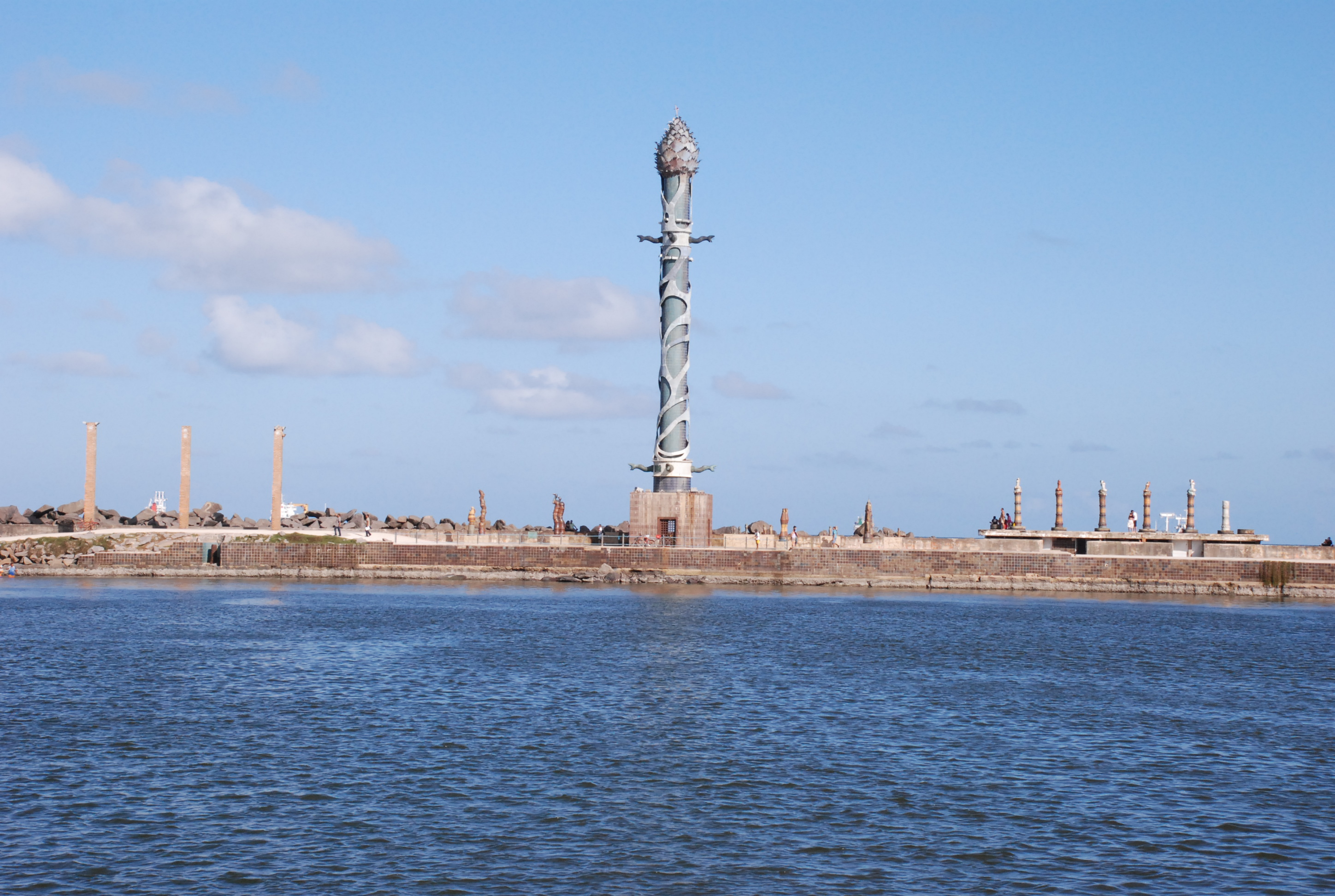
Sculptures Park Francisco Brennand in Recife

Beside his large workshop in Varzea, Francisco Brennand has also an open exhibition space in Marco Zero square, located in Recife Antigo. He created this park in celebration of the Brazilian 500 years of foundation.

- Marco Zero, Recife Antigo

House of Culture (Casa da Cultura) In this space operated before one house of detention, now houses the Museum of the Frevo and a unique crafts shopping center. Each cell has become a regional arts and crafts store. The visitor finds crafts, woodworks, city souvenirs, clay sculptures, antique fine textiles, typical food among other things. All hand-made objects.

- Floriano Peixoto street, Santo Antonio

Monday through Friday 9 am – 7 pm; Saturday 9 am – 6 pm; Sunday 10 am – 3 pm

Pasárgada Area Collection of works, reproduction of works, photos, newspaper articles, from the Manuel Bandeira newspaper. Collected by himself in the home of his grandfather, where he spent his childhood.

- 263, União street, Boa Vista

Monday through Friday - 8am/6pm

Aeronautics Museum (Museu da Aeronáutica)

== Olinda museums ==
Space Science Museum (Espaço Ciência Museu) It is an interactive museum of technology, environment and scientific dissemination located between Recife and Olinda. The area has also two astronomical observatories located outside its headquarters: one in the Malakoff Tower in Recife and the other one in the Alto da Sé IN Olinda. The space science promotes events, courses, workshops, and meetings of science in schools, universities, hospitals, etc.

- Salgadinho neighborhood, Olinda

Tuesday through Sunday - 8 am – 5 pm

Contemporary Art Museum of Pernambuco (MAC - Museu de Arte Contemporânea de Pernambuco) It has a vast collection of artists from Pernambuco as Francisco Brennand, Bajado and João. Besides the permanent collection the museum is always doing exhibitions.

- 149, 13 Maio street, Carmo

Monday through Friday - 9 am – 2.30 pm

Puppets Museum (Museu do Mamulengo (area Tiridá)) Unique space in all South America to save the art of the Mamulengo. This museum keeps a large body of research with over than 1500 pieces. Also, it has the Mamulengo space designated Area Tiridá. This area consists of a theater with one hundred seats which are made into spectacles of dolls/puppets, or hand-molengos.

- 59, Amparo street, Amparo

Sacred Art Museum of Pernambuco (MASP - Museu de Arte Sacra de Pernambuco) Shows permanently beautiful sacred pieces. Works where was the first Bishop palace in Pernambuco.

- 726, Bispo Coutinho street, Alto da Se, Olinda

Monday through Friday - 9 am – 1 pm

== Recife metropolitan area museums ==
Lula Cardoso Ayres Museum Permanent exhibition of the artist's over than 300 works, including paintings, drawings, photographs, and studies.

- 1416, Herminio Alves Queiroz street, Piedade - Jaboatao dos Guararapes

Wednesday through Saturday - 4pm/8pm

Pinacoteca Museum of Igarassu Baroque art works from the 17th and 18th centuries, showing historical moments of the Pernambuco state.

- Igarassu city - 32 km North of Recife

Historical Museum of Igarassu show objects from XVII to XX century to present a history of one of oldest colonial vilagem from America.

== Pernambuco museums ==
Una River Museum (Museu do Una) The collection includes the biodiversity and culture of region's Hydrography watershed of the Una River, along the coastal ecosystems around the island between Tamandaré (PE) and Maragogi (AL).

- Varzéa do Una - Sǎo José da Coroa Grande 105 km South

Friday through Sunday - 11 am – 5 pm

Luis Gonzaga Museum (Museu Gonzagão) Open in 1989, after the death of the great country musician Luiz Gonzaga, considered the King of Baião. Includes objects, discs, pictures, and various accordions used by the musician.

- Casa Branca highway, BR 122, Exú 670 km West

Monday through Friday - 7 am – 5 pm and Saturday through Sunday 7 am – 6 pm

Semi Arid Museum or Sertão Museum Sertão means semi arid in Portuguese, and this museum is about the life and history of the 'Sertão Pernambucano'. Which is portrayed through their work tools, weapons and objects used by the Brazilian cowboys. Also, has a plaster house replica often used by those people. This collection includes also relating material with Lampião, one of the famous Brazilian outlaws from the start of the last century.

- Esmelinda Brandão street, Petrolina - 720 km West Recife

Monday, Wednesday, Thursday, Friday - 10am/6pm Saturday - 2pm/6pm; Sunday - 8am/12am

Cangaço Museum (Museu do Cangaço) The history of Cangaço, one of the Brazilian revolutionary movement and also a life style is preserved in this collection. There are weapons, clothes, letters and various objects used by cangaceiros (cangaço outlaws) during the existence of the Lampião band. Lampião was the famous cangaceiro in the Northeast Region of Brazil in the start of the last century, and the way he operates is something similar to the Robin Hood in England, but for real.

- Monsenhor Elizeu square, Triunfo, Pernambuco - 400 km West

Monday through Saturday - 8 am – 12 noon and 2–5 pm Sunday - 8am/12am

Clay Museum (Museu do Barro - Zé Caboclo) This museum offers to the visitors the best of the craft clay ceramic in the region. Exhibits works as artists as Master Vitalino, but also opens spaces for the new generation of artisans.

- 100, Coronel José Vasconcelos square, Tancredo Neves cultural center, Caruaru - 140 km West

Tuesday through Saturday - 8am/5pm and Sundays - 9am/1pm

Cachaça Museum or Brazilian Rum Museum Its recognized by the Guinness Book of Records as the owner of the largest collection of the Cachaça (also known as the Brazilian rum) in the world. It also has a large number of articles related to this drink, as glasses, tables, pictures, poems, jokes and other decorative curiosities.

- Carpina - 60 km North-West of Recife; open all days 9 am – 5 pm

Sacred Art Museum of Goiana (Museu de Arte Sacra de Goiana) It has an exclusive hall for exhibition of Saints made by local artists with disabilities. There are also sacred art objects from the 17th to the 20th century.

- Nossa Senhora dos Homens Pretos Church, Amparo street, Goiana - 65 km North

Monday through Friday 8am/5pm; Saturday and Sunday - 8 am – 12 noon

== See also ==
- Video Francisco Brennand Museum
- Video Ricardo Brennand Institute Museum
- Video Recife City Museum
- Video Old Recife (PT)
- Video Recife, Capital (PT)
