= List of Alfredo Rossi concerts =

This is a chronological list of live performances by Alfredo Rossi from 1919 to 1983. The list is incomplete because no concerts without references are listed.

== 1919 ==
- 17 March - Rehearsal at the Conservatory "Giuseppe Verdi", Milan

== 1920 ==
- 22 March - Rehearsal at the Conservatory "Giuseppe Verdi"

== 1921 ==
- 24 May - Rehearsal at the Conservatory "Giuseppe Verdi"

== 1926 ==
- 2 February - Conservatory "Giuseppe Verdi", Milan, with Umberto Rossi (cellist)

== 1927 ==
- 23 November - Conservatory "Giuseppe Verdi", Milan, with Umberto Rossi (cellist)

== 1929 ==
- 24 February - Conservatory "Giuseppe Verdi", Milan, with Eliane Rossi (soprano)

== 1930 ==
- 25 May - Rehearsal at the Conservatory "Giuseppe Verdi"

== 1931 ==
- 29 May - Rehearsal at the Conservatory "Giuseppe Verdi"

== 1933 ==
- 12 May - Conservatory "Giuseppe Verdi", Milan, Italy, with Vincenzo Ricci (violinist)
- 15 November - Conservatory "Giuseppe Verdi" with Renato Carenzio (violinist)

== 1934 ==
- 5 March - G.U.F. headquarters, Milan
- 10 April - Conservatory "Giuseppe Verdi", Milan with Dorotea Quinci (soprano), Renato Carenzio (violinist) and Antonio Janigro (cellist)
- 23 April - Conservatory "Giuseppe Verdi" with Celeste Gandolfi (harpist), Renato Carenzio (violinist) and Antonio Janigro (cellist)
- 3 July - Palazzo Chigi-Saracini, Siena with Elsa Allodi (violinist), Ines Maria Ferraris and the female choir of La Scala

== 1935 ==
- 28 January - Conservatory "Giuseppe Verdi" with Carlo Felice Cillario (violinist) and Angelo Parigi (tenor)
- 2 August - Concert at the Italian radio with Antonio Janigro, broadcast for the cities of Milan, Turin, Genoa, Florence, Trieste and Rome
- 4 December - Conservatory "Giuseppe Verdi", Milan with Andor Dula (violinist)

== 1936 ==
- 16 February - Circolo Filologico Milanese, Milan with Maria Fiorenza Ciampelli (soprano)
- 16 March - Sforza Castle, Milan with Paola Schmitzer (soprano) and Franco Rosati (baritone)
- 24 March - Conservatory "Giuseppe Verdi" with Leni Neuenschwander (soprano), Arrigo Tassinari (flutist), Renato Carenzio (violinist), Umberto Rempi (violinist), Alessandro Poleschi (violist) and Umberto Rossi (cellist)
- 3 April - Circolo Filologico Milanese, Milan, with Paola Schmitzer (soprano)
- 14 December - Conservatory "Giuseppe Verdi", Milan, with Antonio Janigro (cellist)

== 1937 ==
- Unknown date - Zagreb Music Institute concert hall, Zagreb, Croatia, with Antonio Janigro
- 29 March - Salón Pietro da Cemmo, Conservatorio Luca Marenzio, Brescia, with Antonio Janigro
- 8 June - University of Milan with Corradina Mola (harpsichordist) and Leonora Angeli-Pilis (soprano)
- 21 October - Concert at the Italian radio with Antonio Janigro, broadcast for the cities of Milan, Turin, Genoa, Florence, Trieste and Rome
- 27 November - Salle Chopin-Pleyel, Paris, France, with Antonio Janigro
- 15 December - Sala del Circolo Dante Alighieri, Piazza Vittorio Emanuele (now Piazza Walther), Bolzano, with Antonio Janigro

== 1938 ==
- 1 February - Conservatory "Giuseppe Verdi", Milan with Pierre Fournier (cellist)
- 14 February - Conservatory "Giuseppe Verdi", Milan, with Pina Carmirelli (violinist)
- 20 April - Concert at the Italian radio, broadcast for the cities of Milan, Turin, Genoa, Florence, Bolzano, Trieste and Rome
- 23 May - Conservatory "Giuseppe Verdi", Milan, with Elda Alberti (pianist) and Margherita Orsi (soprano)

== 1940 ==
- 12 January - Conservatory "Giuseppe Verdi", Milan, with Pierre Fournier (violoncellista).
- 16 January - Conservatorio Giuseppe Verdi, Turin, with Pierre Fournier
- 22 February - Dopolavoro "Il Mare Nosotro", Milan, with Jolanda Pedrazzini Alessi (violinist)
- 7 May - Triennale di Milano, with Clelia Gatti Aldrovandi (harpist), Leni Neuenschwander (soprano) and Gastone Tassinari (flutist)

== 1941 ==
- 21 May - Conservatory "Giuseppe Verdi", Milan, with Livia Sigalla (soprano), Cesare Ferraresi (violinist) and Luigi Casale (violoncellista)
- 22 November - Conservatory "Giuseppe Verdi", Milan, with the strings orchestra of La Scala, Michelangelo Abbado (violinist), Renato Carenzio (violinist), R. Astolfi (violinist), U. Corti (violist) and Aldo Cavolla (cellist)

== 1945 ==
- 12 November - Olimpia Theatre, Milan with Pina Carmirelli (violinist)

== 1946 ==
- 14 April - Sforza Castle
- 31 July - Casa della Cultura, Milan, with Attilio Ranzato (cellist)
- 4 November - Municipal Theatre, Girona, Spain, with the Chamber Orchestra of Milan
- 8 November - San Sebastián with the Chamber Orchestra of Milan
- 18 November - Palau de la Música Catalana, Barcelona, with the Chamber Orchestra of Milan
- 19 November - Palau de la Música Catalana, Barcelona, with the Chamber Orchestra of Milan
- Unknown date - Sociedad Filarmónica de Bilbao, Bilbao, Spain, with the Chamber Orchestra of Milan

== 1947 ==
- 2 February - Centro Studi della Scapigliatura Milanese, Milan, with Vittorio Basevi
- 21 February - Teatro Olimpia, Milan with Pierre Fournier
- 24 February - Sala Ridotto at the Teatro Lirico Giuseppe Verdi, Trieste, with Pierre Fournier (cellist)
- 27 February - Angelicum Theatre, Milan, with Lorenzo Lugli (violinist), Arnaldo Zanetti (violinist), Enzo Francalanci (violist) and Pietro Nava (cellist)
- 10 March - Casa della Cultura, Milan, with Luisa Magenta (soprano)
- 26 May - Societa' Dei Concerti, Bolzano
- 4 December - San Sebastián with Váša Příhoda
- 12 December - Galería Condal, Barcelona with Váša Příhoda
- 29 December - Sala del Circolo Unione, Bari, with the Chamber Orchestra of Milan
- 30 December - Sala del Circolo Unione, Bari with the Chamber Orchestra of Milan

== 1948 ==
- 14 January - Galería Condal, Barcelona with Enrico Mainardi
- 1 February - Palau de la Música Catalana, Barcelona, with Cesare Ferraresi
- 1 March - Sala Ridotto at the Teatro Lirico Giuseppe Verdi, Trieste with Pierre Fournier (cellist)
- 14 March - Gran Casino del Foment, Terrassa, Spain, with Riccardo Brengola
- 3 April - Conservatorio Giuseppe Verdi, Turin, with Antonio Janigro
- 19 April - Teatro del Instituto Francés, Madrid with Pierre Fournier
- 21 April - Palau de la Música Catalana, Barcelona with Pierre Fournier
- 30 April - Instituto Italiano de Cultura, Barcelona with Cesare Ferraresi
- 2 May - Palau de la Música Catalana, Barcelona with Georg Kulenkampff
- 10 May - San Sebastián with Georg Kulenkampff
- 19 May - Palau de la Música Catalana, Barcelona with Georg Kulenkampff
- 2 June - Galería Condal, Barcelona, with Georg Kulenkampff
- 20 October - San Sebastián with Franco Gulli
- 5 November - Teatro Filarmónica, Oviedo with Franco Gulli
- 10 November - Teatro Calderón, Barcelona with Franco Gulli
- 23 November - San Sebastián with Ida Haendel.
- 17 November - Diligentia Theatre, The Hague with Antonio Janigro

== 1949 ==
- 20 January - Palau de la Música Catalana, Barcelona with Virginia Paris
- 21 January - Palau de la Música Catalana, Barcelona with Virginia Paris
- 21 March - Palau de la Música Catalana, Barcelona with Dimitry Markevitch
- 4 April - Palau de la Música Catalana, Barcelona with Mascia Predit.
- 9 May - Conservatorio de Música "Manuel de Falla", Cádiz with Gaspar Cassadó
- 8 June - San Sebastián with Gaspar Cassadó
- 15 June - Palau de la Música Catalana, Barcelona with Gaspar Cassadó
- 10 October - San Sebastián with Ida Haendel
- 17 October - Teatro Principal, Valencia with Ida Haendel
- 30 November - San Sebastián with Enrico Mainardi

== 1950 ==
- 24 February - Teatro Filarmónica, Oviedo with Wanda Luzzato
- Unknown date - Instituto de Cultura Italiana, Madrid with Wanda Luzzato
- 20 April - Instituto de Cultura Italiana, Madrid
- 8 May - Municipal Theatre, Rio de Janeiro with Pierre Fournier
- 11 May - Municipal Theatre, Rio de Janeiro with Pierre Fournier
- 13 July - Concert at the Italian radio with Dimitry Markevitch
- 14 July - Concert at the Italian radio with Dimitry Markevitch
- 30 October - Palau de la Música Catalana, Barcelona with Pierre Fournier
- 31 October - Palau de la Música Catalana, Barcelona with Pierre Fournier
- December - Madrid with André Navarra

== 1951 ==
- 11 January - Instituto de Cultura Italiana, Madrid
- 28 February - Palau de la Música Catalana, Barcelona with Bernard Michelin
- 8 March - Gran Teatre del Liceu, Barcelona with Camilla Wicks.
- 7 August - Municipal Theatre, Rio de Janeiro with Pierre Fournier
- 25 October - Santa Isabel Theatre, Recife with Ida Haendel
- 27 October - Santa Isabel Theatre, Recife with Ida Haendel
- 29 October - Municipal Theatre, Rio de Janeiro with Ida Haendel
- 4 November - Municipal Theatre, Niterói with Ida Haendel
- 6 November - Municipal Theatre, Rio de Janeiro with Ida Haendel

== 1952 ==
- 8 August - Teatro Colón, Buenos Aires with Victoria de los Ángeles
- 1 October - Teatro Cultura Artística, São Paulo with Renato de Barbieri
- 2 October - Teatro Cultura Artística, São Paulo with Renato de Barbieri
- 6 October - Municipal Theatre São Paulo with Renato de Barbieri

== 1953 ==
- 7 July - Municipal Theatre, São Paulo, with Ruggiero Ricci
- 18 July - Santa Isabel Theatre, Recife, with Ruggiero Ricci
- 20 July - Santa Isabel Theatre, Recife, with Ruggiero Ricci
- 29 July - Municipal Theatre, Rio de Janeiro, with Ida Haendel
- 7 August - Santa Isabel Theatre, Recife, with Ida Haendel
- 8 August - Santa Isabel Theatre, Recife, with Ida Haendel
- 10 August - Santa Isabel Theatre, Recife, with Ida Haendel
- 18 August - Teatro São Pedro, São Paulo, with Ida Haendel
- 5 September - Municipal Theatre, Rio de Janeiro, with Ricardo Odnoposoff
- 27 September - Municipal Theatre, Rio de Janeiro, with Erno Valasek
- 13 November - San Sebastián with Wanda Lazzato
- 19 November - Teatro Principal, Pontevedra, with Wanda Lazzato
- 9 December - San Sebastián with Erno Valasek

== 1954 ==
- 22 January - Conservatory "Giuseppe Verdi" with Erno Valasek (violinist).
- 1 February - Teatro Principal, Valencia with Ida Haendel
- 10 February - Assembly Rooms, Gibraltar, with Ida Haendel
- 15 February - San Sebastián with Ida Haendel
- 7 March - Sociedad Filarmónica de Bilbao, Bilbao with Alfredo Campoli.
- 13 March - Sabada with Alfredo Campoli
- 17 March - Bilbao with Alfredo Campoli
- 29 March - Bilbao with Alfredo Campoli
- 31 March - Santander with Alfredo Campoli
- 2 April - San Sebastián with Alfredo Campoli
- 8 April - Palau de la Música Catalana, Barcelona with Alfredo Campoli
- 5 May - Sociedad Filarmónica de Bilbao, Bilbao, Spain, with Elisabeth Schwarzkopf
- 6 May - San Sebastián with Elisabeth Schwarzkopf
- 16 May - Teatro Nacional de São Carlos, Lisbon with Elisabeth Schwarzkopf
- 5 September - Municipal Theatre, Rio de Janeiro with Ricardo Odnoposoff
- 7 September - Concert at the Brazilian radio Jornal do Brasil with Ricardo Odnoposoff
- 9 September - Auditorium at the Pontificia Universidade do Rio Grande do Sul, São Paulo with Ricardo Odnoposoff
- 25 September - Municipal Theatre, Santiago, Chile, with Victoria de los Ángeles.
- Unknown date - Montevideo with Victoria de los Ángeles

== 1955 ==
- 18 April - Santa Isabel Theatre, Recife with Ruben Varga
- 3 May - Municipal Theatre, Rio de Janeiro with Ruben Varga
- 28 October - Auditorium Theatre, Havana with Victoria de los Ángeles
- 29 October - Auditorium Theatre, Havana with Victoria de los Ángeles
- 2 December - San Sebastián with Wanda Luzzato

== 1956 ==
- 23 January - San Sebastián with Sirio Piovesan
- 22 February - Palau de la Música Catalana, Barcelona with Ivry Gitlis
- 8 March - Hotel Castellana Hilton, Madrid with Ruggiero Ricci
- 25 April - Palazzo Serbelloni, Milan, with Marco Granchi (violinist)
- 2 June - Buenos Aires with Alfredo Campoli
- 9 June - Buenos Aires with Alfredo Campoli
- 17 June - Municipal Theatre, Santiago de Chile with Alfredo Campoli
- 9 July - Solís Theatre, Montevideo with Alfredo Campoli
- 17 July - Santa Fé with Alfredo Campoli
- 23 July - Municipal Theatre São Paulo with Alfredo Campoli
- 24 July - Salvador de Bahia with Alfredo Campoli
- 30 July - Pernambuco with Alfredo Campoli
- 6 August - Teatro Monumental, Buenos Aires with Gloria Davy
- 7 August - Teatro Monumental, Buenos Aires with Gloria Davy
- 20 November - Willemstad, Curaçao, with Christian Ferras
- 26 November - Municipal Theatre, Rio de Janeiro with Christian Ferras
- 28 November - Municipal Theatre São Paulo with Christian Ferras
- 30 November - Municipal Theatre São Paulo with Christian Ferras

== 1957 ==
- 3 June - Municipal Theatre, Rio de Janeiro with Pierre Fournier
- 6 June - Municipal Theatre São Paulo with Pierre Fournier
- 10 June - Auditorio do Colegio Estadual do Paraná, Curitiba with Pierre Fournier
- Unknown date - National Museum of Decorative Arts, Buenos Aires with Pierre Fournier

== 1958 ==
- 28 May - Municipal Theatre, Rio de Janeiro with Antonio Janigro
- 4 June - Auditorio do Colegio Estadual do Paraná, Curitiba with Antonio Janigro
- 25 October - Centro Cultural La Comuna, La Plata with Noemí Souza

== 1959 ==
- 25 May - Municipal Theatre, Rio de Janeiro with Ida Haendel
- 25 August - Municipal Theatre, Rio de Janeiro with Lawrence Winters
- 31 August - Santa Isabel Theatre, Recife with Lawrence Winters

== 1960 ==
- 19 January - Liceo Clásico Pietro Verri, Lodi, with Ivry Gitlis
- 20 March - St. Xavier's Institution, Penang, Malaysia, with Bernard Michelin
- 23 March - Victoria Theatre, Singapore, with Bernard Michelin
- 24 March - Victoria Theatre, Singapore, with Bernard Michelin
- 30 March - Victoria Theatre, Singapore, with Bernard Michelin
- 2 May - Concert at the Singapore radio with Bernard Michelin
- 29 May - ABC Hall, Osaka with Bernard Michelin
- Unknown date - Federico Santa María Technical University, Valparaíso with Bernard Michelin

== 1961 ==
- Unknown date - Teatro Odeón, Buenos Aires with Janine Andrade

== 1962 ==
- 9 Jun - Teatro Colón, Buenos Aires with Victoria de los Ángeles

== 1963 ==
- Unknown date - National Museum of Decorative Arts, Buenos Aires with Salvatore Accardo
- Unknown date - National Museum of Decorative Arts, Buenos Aires with Peter-Lukas Graf
- Unknown date - Teatro General San Martín, Buenos Aires with Anahí Carfi

== 1965 ==
- 11 September - Teatro Colón, Buenos Aires with Montserrat Caballé

== 1966 ==
- May - Teatro Colón, Buenos Aires with Salvatore Accardo
- 12 June - Municipal Theatre, Santiago de Chile, Chile, with Salvatore Accardo

== 1967 ==
- Unknown date - Teatro General San Martín, Buenos Aires with Ruben Gonzalez

== 1969 ==
- April - Santa Fé with Szymsia Bajour
- 23 June - Auditorio da Reitoria da Universidade Federal do Paraná, Curitiba with Salvatore Accardo
- 30 June - Concert at the TV Globo/Radio MEC, Rio de Janeiro with Salvatore Accardo
- 14 September - Teatro Colón, Buenos Aires with Agustín León Ara

== 1970 ==
- 26 May - Auditorio Italia, São Paulo with Uto Ughi
- July - Teatro Colón, Buenos Aires with Uto Ughi

== 1972 ==
- 1 July - Teatro Colón, Buenos Aires with Salvatore Accardo

== 1973 ==
- 21 May - Teatro Municipal, São Paulo with Antonio Janigro
- 23 May - Sala Cecilia Meireles, Rio de Janeiro with Antonio Janigro
- 30 May - Sala Cecilia Meireles, Rio de Janeiro with Antonio Janigro
- 11 June - Municipal Theatre São Paulo with Antonio Janigro

== 1974 ==
- 30 May - Municipal Theatre São Paulo with Salvatore Accardo
- 31 May - Municipal Theatre São Paulo with Salvatore Accardo
- 4 June - Sala Cecilia Meireles, Rio de Janeiro with Salvatore Accardo

== 1975 ==
- Unknown date - Teatro Coliseo, Buenos Aires with Pierre Fournier

== 1976 ==
- 28 June - Sala Cecilia Meireles, Rio de Janeiro with Andre Navarra

== 1978 ==
- 11 September - Municipal Theatre São Paulo with Andre Navarra

== 1983 ==
- 21 September - Teatro Coliseo, Buenos Aires with Ana Chumachenco
