= Porto Digital =

Brazilian initiative

Porto Digital, also known as The Porto Digital Science Park, is an initiative in Recife, Brazil that aims to foster technological innovation in the Northeast region of Brazil. It began in July 2000 on the island of Recife Antigo, where the port from the time of the 17th century Dutch occupation of the area was located. Porto Digital has grown steadily since 2000, reporting more than 330 technology companies that employ more than 11,000 people and housing 800 entrepreneurs within the zone by 2020.

== History and development ==
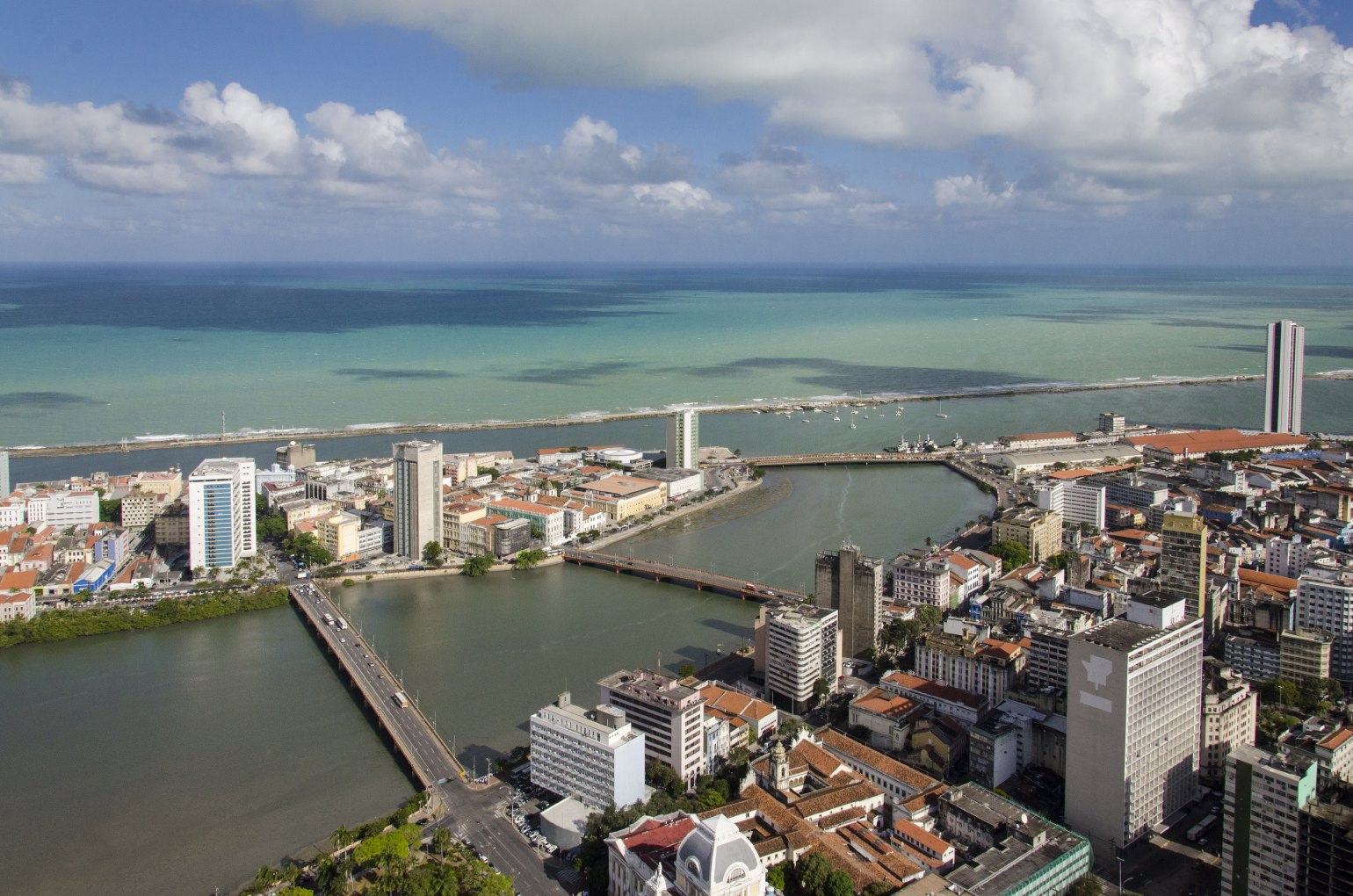
View of Porto Digital in 2012

Porto Digital was created in Recife in July 2000 as a result of a joint effort of the Pernambuco state government, private sector and the Inter-American Development Bank (IDB). Most of the funding for the creation of Porto Digital came from the privatization of CELPE, the state's electricity company. The companies and incubators that form the science park are mostly housed in buildings on the island that is known as Old Recife.

Porto Digital hosts CESAR, Brazil's most innovative R&D institute according to a federal government assessment in 2004. The science park was evaluated as the largest in Brazil in 2005 by AT Kearney and in 2007, 2011 and 2015 won the prize for best Brazilian Science Park, given by the Brazilian Association of Science Parks and Business Incubators (ANPROTEC). It was described in 2013 as a coordinated effort between the federal and state governments, becoming an economic keystone in Pernambuco state since its start in 2000.

Porto Digital is a member of the International Association of Science Parks and Areas of Innovation (IASP), an NGO in special consultative status with the UN, and hosted the association's 30th World Conference, "IASP Recife" in 2013.

== Government investments ==
The local and federal government do not directly pool resources in order to invest in the park, they offer however a certain amount of fiscal incentives to its companies. The biggest ones are a discount of up to 60 per cent on the ISS, a sort of municipal services tax and the "Lei de Informática" (Leis 8.248/91, 10.176/01 e 11.077/04) which concedes reduction of the IPI taxes for companies which develop hardware and automation solutions. In a country with one of the world's most onerous tax systems, fiscal incentives are a significant factor for the success of a tech hub in the region. The incentives are not only tax reductions but also labour incentives, since they reduce bureaucracy and costs involved in the process of hiring new workforce.

== Corporate partnerships ==
The business incubator and innovation center, Recife Center for Advanced Studies and Systems (C.E.S.A.R), is the largest business in Porto Digital and serves as a flagship company for the technological park. One of the reasons for the success of Porto Digital is the high-skilled workforce delivered by the Center of Informatics (CIn) of the Federal University of Pernambuco, (UFPE). Sergio Cavalcante, CEO of C.E.S.A.R., is also a professor at CIn, demonstrating a close relationship between industry and academy. The university also offers an "Entrepreneurship Project" course, "Projetao", which helps students develop innovative ideas and turn them into products. Many of the products developed for this course have eventually become real products sold by start-ups. For example, In Loco Media (previously UBee) developed an accurate indoor location app that powers its mobile advertising network. Porto Digital is also a research development center for international clients like Fiat Chrysler Automobiles.

== Goals ==
Porto Digital articulates its development strategy in the form of ten-year plans. Its main stated objective is to be the best environment in the country for disruptive innovation and entrepreneurship in IT-related areas and creative industries. Locally, it intends to be an anchor for the sustainable development of the Pernambuco economy. Porto Digital's first strategic goal was to have 20,000 professionals employed and the aggregated value of 400 innovative enterprises by 2020. To achieve these goals, Porto Digital developed 40 articulated projects in six strategic areas:

- Increase the capacity of Porto Digital to attract new investments and to strengthen the competitiveness of the businesses in the technological park
- Integration of Porto Digital with sectors of the economy that lack appropriate technological support
- National expansion and internationalization of Porto Digital
- Strengthening of the image and brand of the technological park
- Actions to promote social, economic and environmental sustainability
- Strengthening of the technical and managerial capabilities of Porto Digital

In 2014, Porto Digital was home to 500 entrepreneurs and 240 institutions, with another 150 related companies located in Recife but not in the Porto Digital zone.

== Governance ==
Porto Digital is run by a non-profit organization called the Porto Digital Management Unit (NGPD). It is managed by an 18-member administrative council. The members represent the firms installed in the park, other companies with ties to Porto Digital, the state government, UFPE university and Recife City Hall. It is the Council's responsibility to decide on policies and strategies that enable and promote Porto Digital's development.

The council has the ability to appoint a board of directors comprising a president, a director of innovation and business competition, and an executive officer. The NGPD's permanent technical staff members have degrees in innovation, information technology, project management, urban planning, and related fields.
