= Fernando Dueire =

Brazilian politician

Senator for Pernambuco
- Incumbent
- Assumed office 7 December 2022
- Preceded by: Jarbas Vasconcelos

Secretary of Infrastructure of Pernambuco
- In office 1999–2006

Personal details
- Born: Fernando Antonio Caminha Dueire; April 14, 1959 (age 67) Recife, Pernambuco, Brazil
- Party: MDB (2015–present)

Fernando Antonio Caminha Dueire (born 14 April 1959) is a Brazilian politician who has been one of the senators from the state of Pernambuco since 2022. Elected as a substitute initially, he succeeded Jarbas Vasconcelos who resigned due to health issues. He is currently affiliated with Brazilian Democratic Movement (MDB). He had previously been the state secretary of infrastructure of Pernambuco from 1999 to 2006.
