= List of mayors of Recife =

The following is a list of mayors of the city of Recife, Brazil.

- José Mariano Carneiro da Cunha, 1891
- Francisco do Rego Barros Lacerda, 1891–1892
- Manuel Pinto Damaso, 1892–1893
- José Marcelino da Rosa e Silva, 1893–1896
- José de Cupertino Coelho Cintra, 1896–1899
- Luiz Cavalcanti de Almeida, 1899
- Esmeraldino Olímpio de Torres Bandeira, 1899
- Manuel dos Santos Moreira, 1899–1905
- Martins de Barros, 1905–1908
- Arquimedes de Oliveira, 1908–1911
- Eudoro Correia, 1911–1915
- Marco Antônio de Morais Rego, 1915–1918
- Lima Castro, 1918–1922
- Antônio Ribeiro Pessoa, 1922
- Antônio de Góis Cavalcanti, 1922–1925, 1931–1934
- Alfredo Osório de Cerqueira, 1925–1926
- Joaquim Pessoa Guerra, 1926–1928
- Francisco da Costa Maia, 1928–1930
- Lauro Borba, 1930–1931
- João Pereira Borges, 1934–1937
- Antônio de Novais Filho, 1937–1945
- José dos Anjos, 1945–1946
- Pelópidas da Silveira, 1946, 1955–1960, 1963–1964
- Clóvis de Castro, 1946–1947
- Antônio Alves Pereira, 1947–1948
- Manuel César de Morais Rego, 1948–1951
- Antônio A. Pereira, 1951–1952
- Jorge Manuel Martins da Silva, 1952–1953
- José do Rego Maciel, 1953–1955
- Djair Falcão Brindeiro, 1955
- Miguel Arraes, 1960–1963
- Liberato da Costa Júnior, 1963
- Augusto da Silva Lucena, 1964–1969, 1971–1975
- Geraldo Magalhães Melo, 1969–1971
- Antônio Arruda de Farias, 1975–1979
- Gustavo Krause, 1979–1982
- Jorge Cavalcante, 1982–1983
- Joaquim Francisco Cavalcanti, 1983–1985, 1989–1990
- Jarbas Vasconcelos, 1986–1988, 1993–1996
- Gilberto Marques Paulo, 1990–1992
- Roberto Magalhães, 1997–2000
- João Paulo Lima, 2001–2008
- João da Costa, 2009–2012
- Geraldo Júlio, 2013–2020
- João Henrique Campos, 2021–2026
- Victor Marques, 2026–present

== See also ==
- Câmara Municipal do Recife (city council)
- Timeline of Recife
- List of mayors of largest cities in Brazil (in Portuguese)
- List of mayors of capitals of Brazil (in Portuguese)
