= Campo das Princesas Palace =

Administrative headquarters of Pernambuco's executive branch

- Palácio do Campo das Princesas
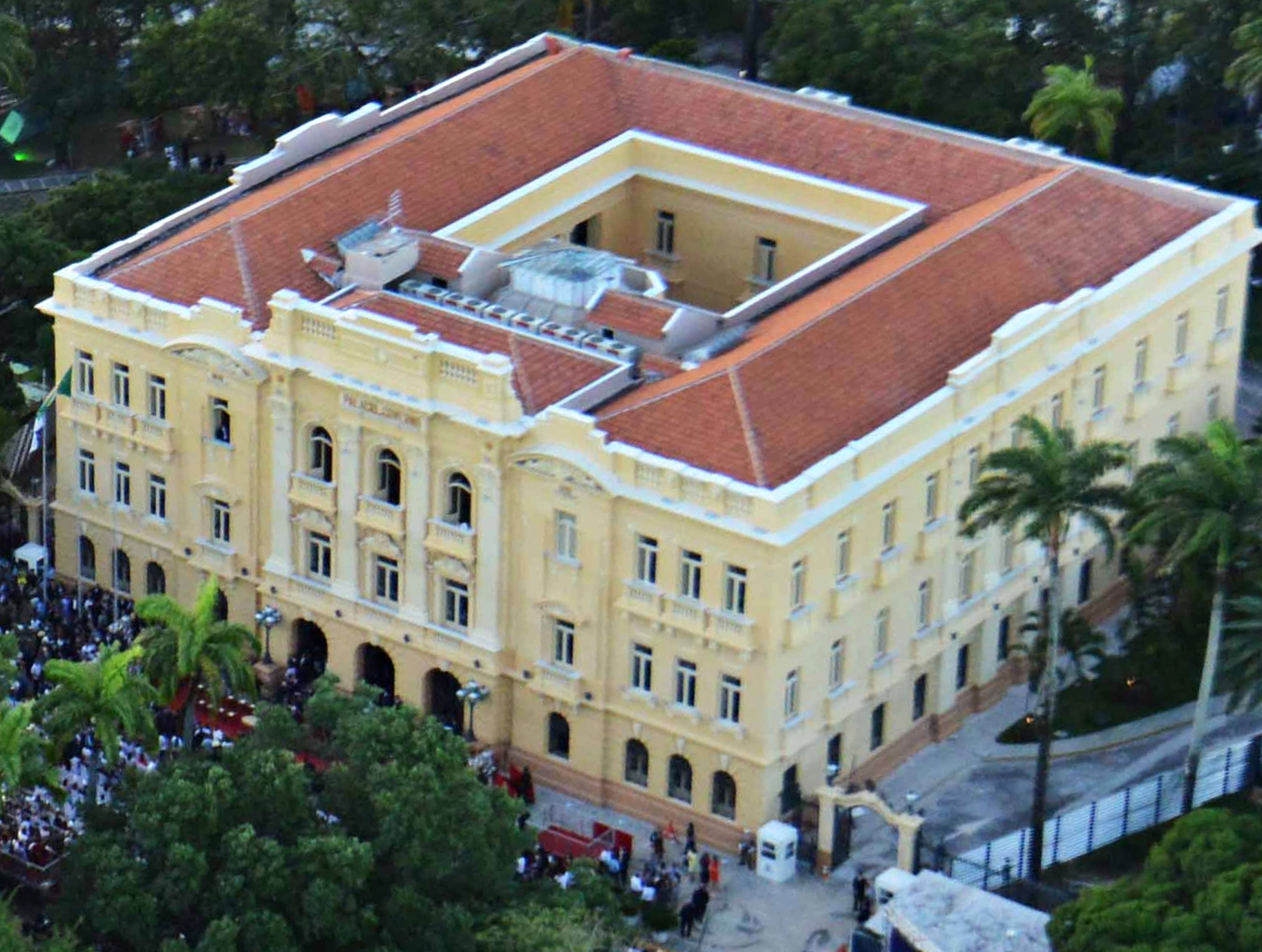

- Location within Brazil
- Alternative names: Palácio das Princesas

General information
- Location: Recife, Pernambuco, Brazil
- Coordinates: 8.06°S 34.8775°W
- Current tenants: Raquel Lyra (as governor of the state of Pernambuco)
- Year built: 1841
- Owner: State of Pernambuco

Technical details
- Floor count: 3

Design and construction
- Architect: Firmino Herculano de Morais Âncora

Other information
- Facilities: Pernambuco Pernambuco Government Headquarters; Governor's Official Residence

The Campo das Princesas Palace is the administrative headquarters of Pernambuco's executive branch, located in Recife, Brazil. Designed in 1786 by Governor José César Meneses, it was built in 1841 by engineer Morais Âncora, at the behest of Governor Francisco do Rego Barros, where the Royal Treasury used to be.

It is located in the neighborhood of Santo Antônio (Antônio Vaz Island), in Praça da República, next to the Santa Isabel Theater and the Palace of Justice.

In front of it is a centuries-old baobab tree, possibly the source of inspiration for Saint-Exupéry when he wrote The Little Prince. (Note: Some say it's the baobab in Praça da República; others claim it's the baobab in Natal, which is bigger than the one in Recife, as there are reports that Saint-Exupéry visited both cities when he was writing "The Little Prince".)

== History ==
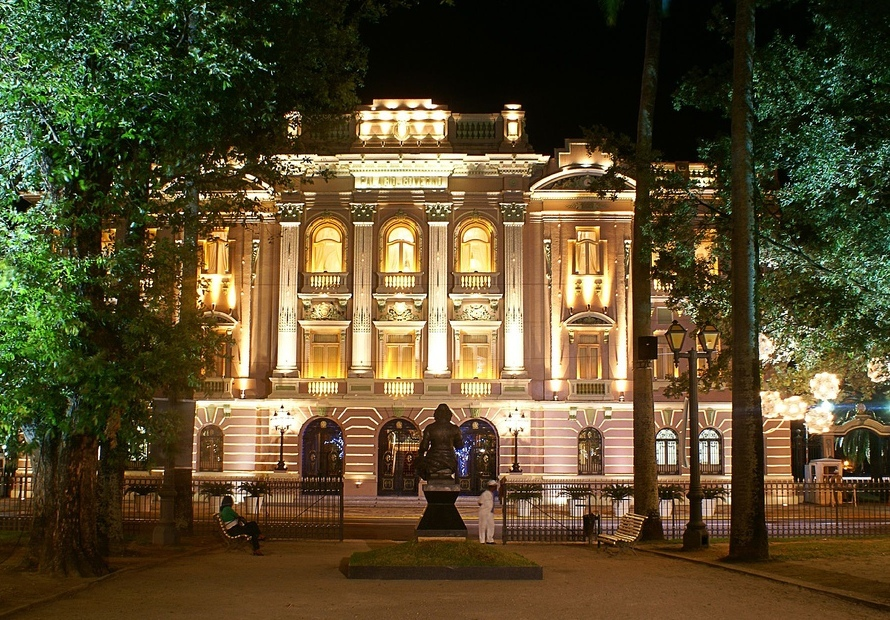
Facade of the Campo das Princesas Palace at night.

The idea of having a new building for the governors of the province of Pernambuco came about during the time of Governor José César de Menezes, in 1786. The Palace was built on the site of the old Palace of Friburgo, built by John Maurice of Nassau.

Nearby, to the west, lay the rubble of what was once the Palace of Fribourg, the headquarters of the Nassauvian government during the Dutch invasions.

Its construction dates back to the middle of the 19th century when, in 1841, the then Governor Francisco do Rego Barros, later Count of Boa Vista, commissioned the engineer Firmino Herculano de Morais Âncora to build the Provincial Palace, which the Republic would turn into the State Palace.

In 1859, it was renovated to accommodate Emperor Dom Pedro II, Empress Teresa Cristina of the Two Sicilies and their daughters, and was then renamed to Campo das Princesas (lit. 'Field of Princesses'). The name was initially given to the garden and later extended to the Palace.

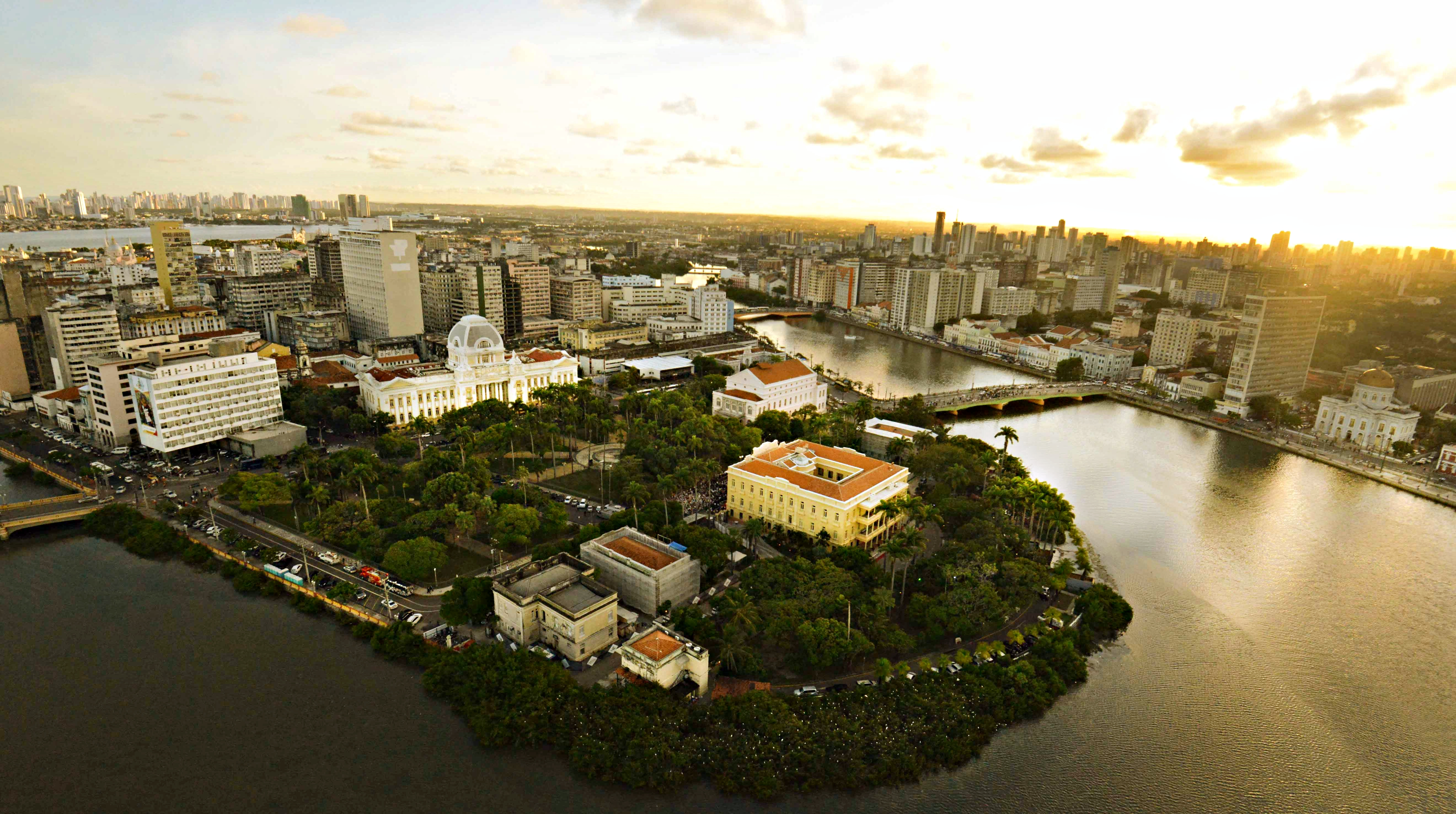
Panoramic view of Praça da República, on Antônio Vaz Island. The Campo das Princesas Palace is located near the confluence of the Capibaribe River and the Beberibe River.

However, it wasn't until 1841, when Francisco do Rego Barros was in office, that a new palace was built for the governors of Pernambuco, replacing the Erário Régio building. The project was designed by engineer Colonel Moraes Âncora.

The new building, with two floors, had a large door in the center of the main façade, flanked by four smaller ones, surrounded by windows and with the front facing the east-south part of the city and no longer the sea.

Before Emperor Pedro II and his wife Empress Tereza Cristina visited Pernambuco accompanied by a large entourage of nobles and court officials, the then president of the province, Luiz Barbalho Muniz Fiúza, appointed a commission under his chairmanship to make arrangements and preparations to transform the palace, which would host the royal visitors, into an Imperial Palace.

After his stay in Pernambuco, Dom Pedro II wrote in his diary:

"The palace is very well kept: next to the house they've also prepared a bathing place for me in the river," but the following information is underlined: "but for the sake of caution I'm not going to bathe there..."

At the time, the park in front of the palace, previously called Campo da Honra, was called Largo do Paço, but people started calling it Campo das Princesas, in homage to the daughters of the Emperors of Brazil. This was the extent of Pernambuco's sympathy for the imperial family, who had honored the province with a visit lasting almost a month.

After this golden phase as the Imperial Palace, the Government Palace was left behind, and it wasn't until 1873 that a new renovation was carried out. At the back, without altering its front and dimensional architecture, another floor was built connected to the main building, to serve as the governor's residence, as well as two other separate floors for general purposes.

In 1920, under José Rufino Bezerra Cavalcanti's government, the building was renovated once again and another floor was built, covering the entire body of the building, which became much larger. The previous small buildings were demolished to make way for a garden park and new floors were built for use by the state offices. The architectural ensemble was then similar to the one that exists today. Due to the death of Governor José Rufino Bezerra Cavalcanti, these works were only completed in 1922 during the interim government of Severino Pinheiro.

The lighting in the palace was the most modern and largest ever done in Pernambuco. There were 75 spots, with a total of 75,000 candles. The entire installation was built into the walls using lead conductors, which was a novelty at the time. Luxurious Louis XVI-style crystal chandeliers and several ornamental wall lights were installed in all the halls and vestibules, which along with the chandeliers made up a total of 143 lighting points.

During the government of Estácio Coimbra, from 1926 to 1930, the palace was renovated, decorated and furnished and, in 1967, it was used as the headquarters for the government of the Republic, under President Arthur da Costa e Silva and Governor Nilo de Sousa Coelho.

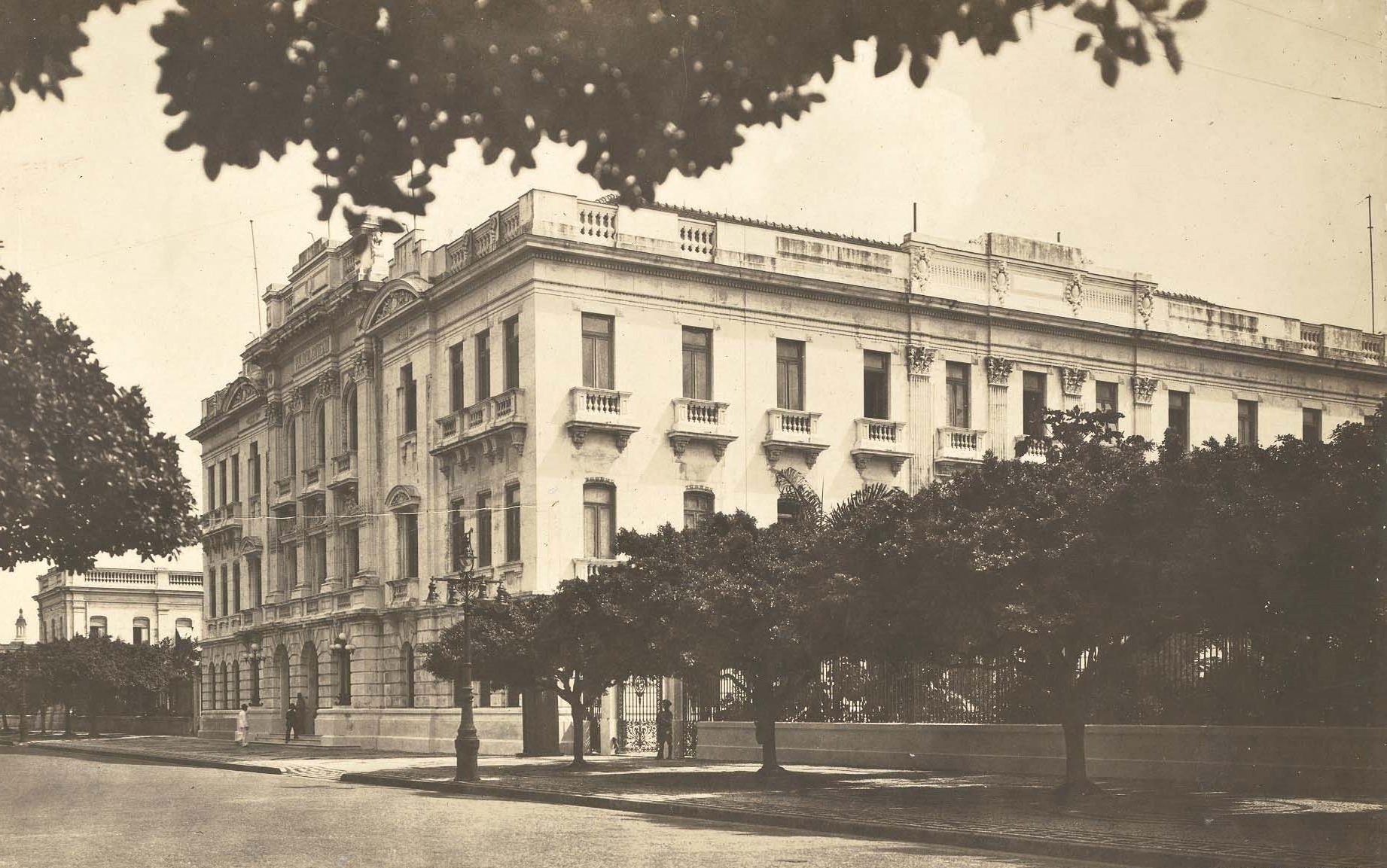
The palace in 1929.

In 1980, the city officially renamed the area Praça da República, but the expression Campo das Princesas remains to this day.

A stage for major events and a witness to important political meetings, the Campo das Princesas Palace has stood on the same spot that Count Maurício de Nassau chose as the seat of Pernambuco's government since the 17th century.

== See also ==
- Legislative Assembly of Pernambuco
