= Mendonça Filho =

Brazilian company administrator and politician

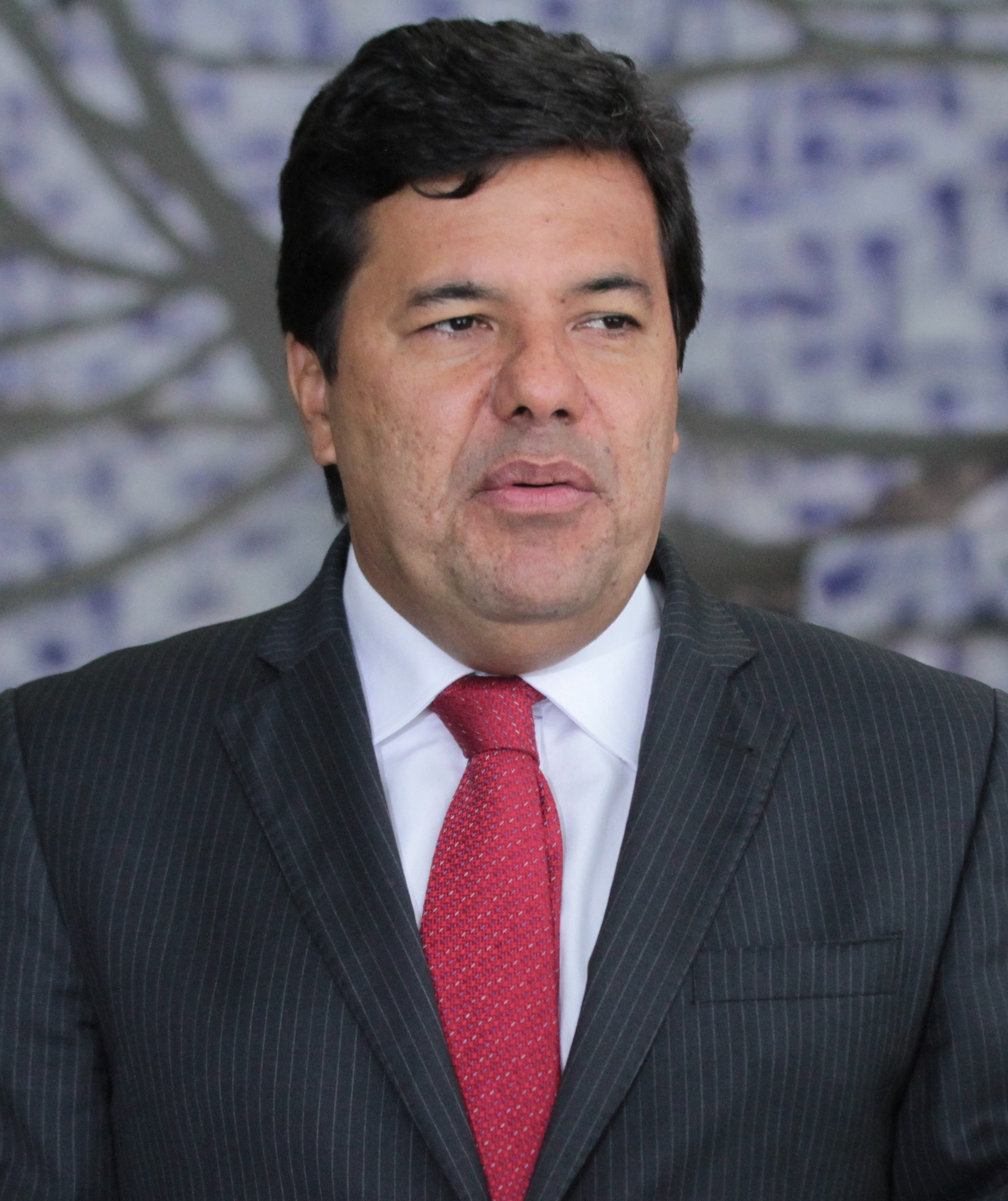

Member of the Chamber of Deputies
- Incumbent
- Assumed office 1 February 2023
- Constituency: Pernambuco
- In office 1 February 2011 – 1 February 2019
- Constituency: Pernambuco
- In office 1 February 1995 – 18 December 1998
- Constituency: Pernambuco

Minister of Education
- In office 12 May 2016 – 6 April 2018
- President: Michel Temer
- Preceded by: Aloizio Mercadante
- Succeeded by: Maria Helena Guimarães de Castro

68th Governor of Pernambuco
- In office 31 March 2006 – 1 January 2007
- Vacant
- Preceded by: Jarbas Vasconcelos
- Succeeded by: Eduardo Campos

Vice Governor of Pernambuco
- In office 1 January 1999 – 31 March 2006
- Governor: Jarbas Vasconcelos
- Preceded by: Jorge José Gomes
- Succeeded by: João Lyra Neto

State Deputy of Pernambuco
- In office 1 February 1987 – 1 February 1995

Personal details
- Born: José Mendonça Bezerra Filho; 12 July 1966 (age 60) Recife, Pernambuco, Brazil
- Party: UNIÃO (2022–present)
- Other political affiliations: DEM (1986–2022)
- Spouse: Taciana Vilaça Mendonça
- Education: University of Pernambuco (UFPE)
- Occupation: Company administrator, politician

José Mendonça Bezerra Filho (born 12 July 1966 in Recife) is a Brazilian company administrator and politician, member of Democrats (DEM) political party. He was the minister of Education of Brazil, nominated by president Michel Temer, from 12 May 2016 until 6 April 2018.

Political offices
Preceded by Jorge José Gomes	Vice Governor of Pernambuco; 1999–2006	Succeeded by João Lyra Neto
Preceded by Jarbas Vasconcelos	Governor of Pernambuco; 2006–2007	Succeeded by Eduardo Campos
Preceded by Aloizio Mercadante	Minister of Education; 2016–2018	Succeeded by Maria Helena Guimarães de Castro
