= Francisco Brennand =

Brazilian sculptor and painter (1927–2019)

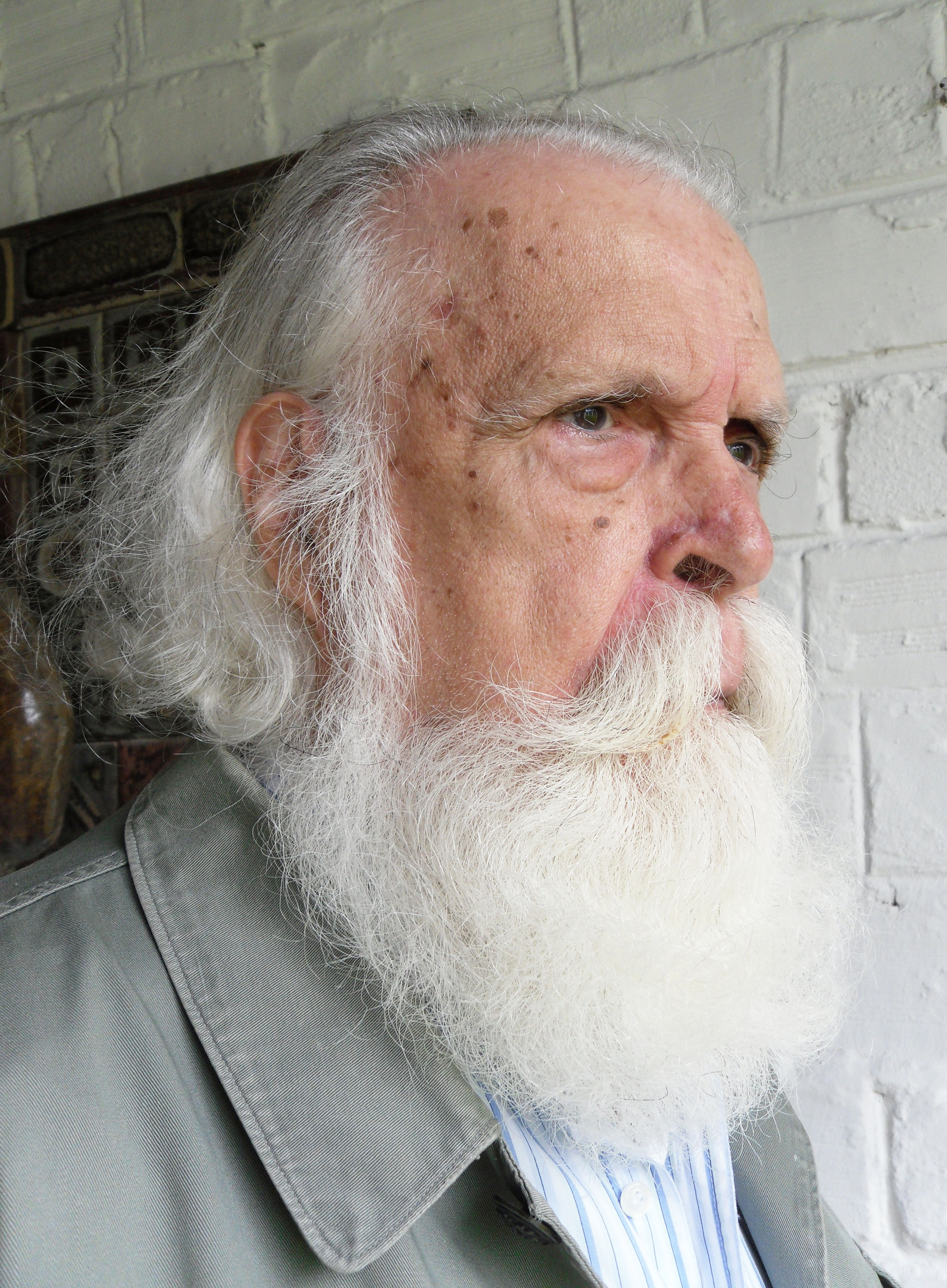
- Born: June 11, 1927; Recife, Pernambuco
- Died: December 19, 2019 (aged 92); Recife
- Occupations: Sculptor and visual artist

Francisco Brennand, or Francisco de Paula de Almeida Brennand, (June 11, 1927 – December 19, 2019), was a Brazilian painter and sculptor, best known for his work in ceramics.

== Life ==
Francisco de Paula de Almeida Brennand was born in Recife, Brazil, to Ricardo Monteiro Brennand and Olímpia Padilha Nunes Coimbra on June 11, 1927. He was a descendant from an Irish ancestor who migrated to Recife in 1820 and married into a sugar plantation family. His father, Ricardo Brennand, added ceramic tile and brick to the business in 1917, and sent his son Francisco to Europe to study technical ceramic skills. Arriving in Paris in 1949, Brennand discovered the ceramic work of Pable Picasso, Joan Miró and Fernand Léger, and became a ceramic artist.

In 1948, he married Déborah de Moura Vasconcelos. In 1950 he was awarded second prize at the 9th Pernambuco Salon with the painting “Mamão e Bananas”. In 1961, Brennand began producing the ceramic mural “Batalha dos Guararapes”, with poems by Cesar Leal and Ariano Suassuna, on Recife's Rua das Flores. Later, in 1968, he collaborated with Suassuna on the costumes for the first cinematographic production of O Auto da Compadecida. In 1971, he participated in the 11th São Paulo Biennial with 12 paintings.

In 1971, Brennand returned to the ruins of his father's tile factory and set about turning it into what would become the Oficina Brennand, producing both tiles and his own ceramic sculpture. Between 1975 and 1985, he created many of the sculptures that now inhabit the studio, where he developed and refined his ceramic imaginary. In the following years, he produced murals and panels for various public and corporate buildings, such as the mural for the Companhia Hidroelétrica do São Francisco (1979), in Recife; the ceramic mural for the Companhia do Desenvolvimento do Vale de São Francisco, in Brasilia (1980); and the “Monumento aos Três Heróis da Restauração” (1981) for the Departamento Nacional de Estradas de Rodagem, in Recife.

In 1985, he was invited to participate in the 18th São Paulo Biennial. In the same year, he received the medal of "Officier de L'Ordre des Arts et des Lettres" from the French Ministry of Culture. In 1989, he took part in the 2nd International Biennial of Óbidos, Portugal. The following year, he represented Brazil at the 44th Venice Biennial. In 1992, he was part of the group shows EXPO 92, in Seville, and Imagem do Brasil/A Busca Europeia de um Paraíso Terrestre e a Arte Moderna Brasileira, in Zurich.

In 1993, the Staatliche Kunsthalle in Berlin held a major retrospective of his work. The same year he received the Inter-American Prize of Culture Gabriela Mistral, awarded by the OEA - Organização dos Estados Americanos, in Washington, D.C. He creates “O Grande Sol” (1995–1996) for MAMAM - Museu de Arte Moderna Aloísio Magalhães, in Recife. In 2000, he created “Parque das Esculturas” (2000), located at Marco Zero in Recife, part of the project "Eu vi o mundo... Ele começava no Recife", which compiles almost 100 works by the artist. Among his most recent works, he produced “O Gigante Nabuco” (2010), for the Academia Brasileira de Letras, in Rio de Janeiro, and “Pássaro Rocca” (2013), located at the Trianon-Masp subway station in São Paulo.

Brennand died of a respiratory infection on December 19, 2019, at the Real Hospital Português in Recife, at the age of 92. The Governor of the state of Pernambuco declared a three-day period of mourning.

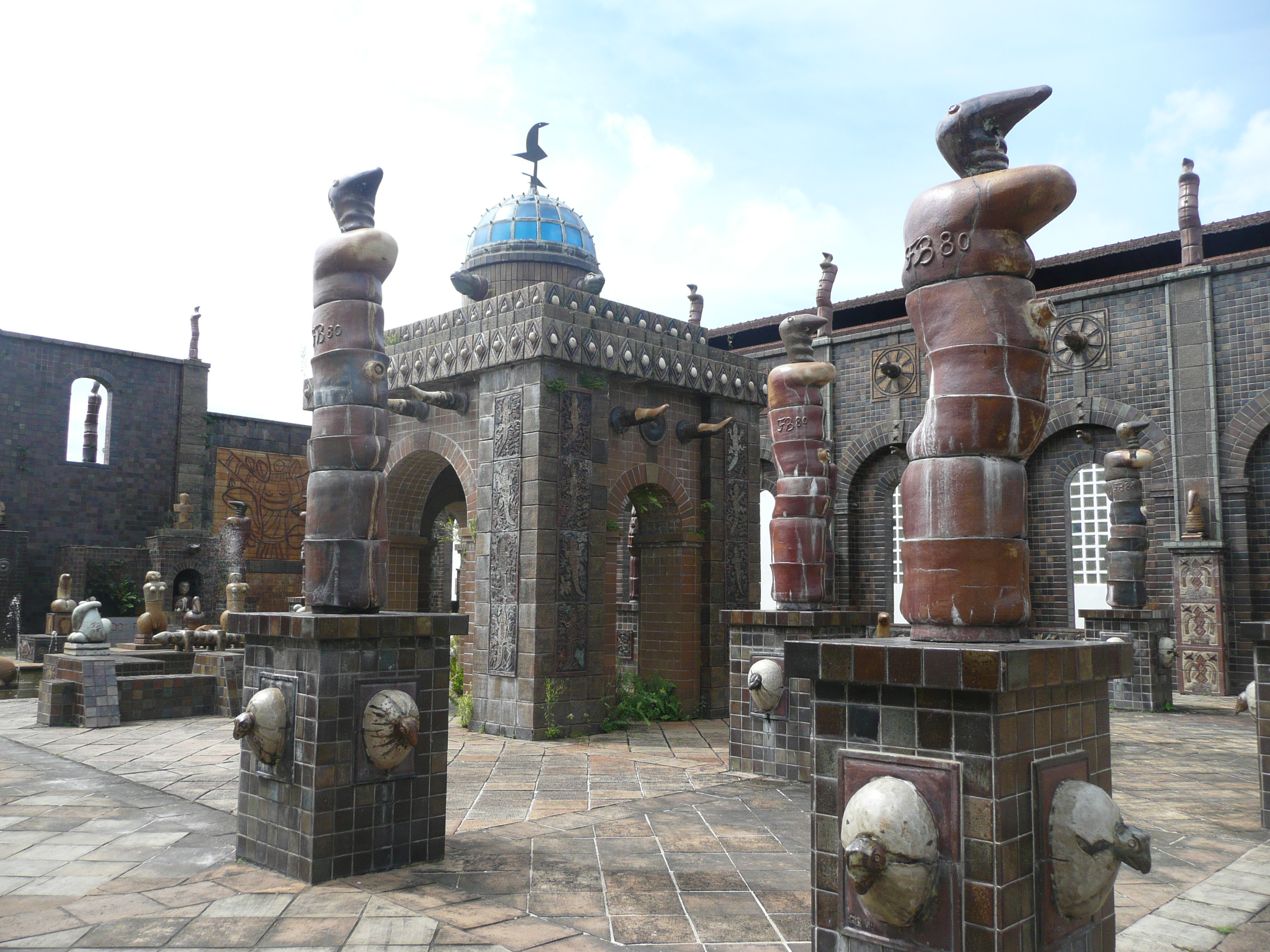
Outdoor ceramic sculptures by Francisco Brennand at the Oficina Brennand in Recife, Brazil.

He has held several solo exhibitions in important institutions, such as "Brennand", at Casa França Brasil, in 2000; "Brennand no Acerto com o Mundo", at Fundação Júlio Rezende, in Portugal, in 2001; "Brennand Esculturas: o homem e a natureza", at the Museu Oscar Niemeyer, in 2004; "Francisco Brennand: Flores, frutos, bichos e pássaros dos anos 60, 70 e 80", at the Afro-Brazil Museum, in 2007; and "Francisco Brennand – Senhor da Várzea, da Argila e do Fogo", at Santander Cultural, in 2007.

== Work ==
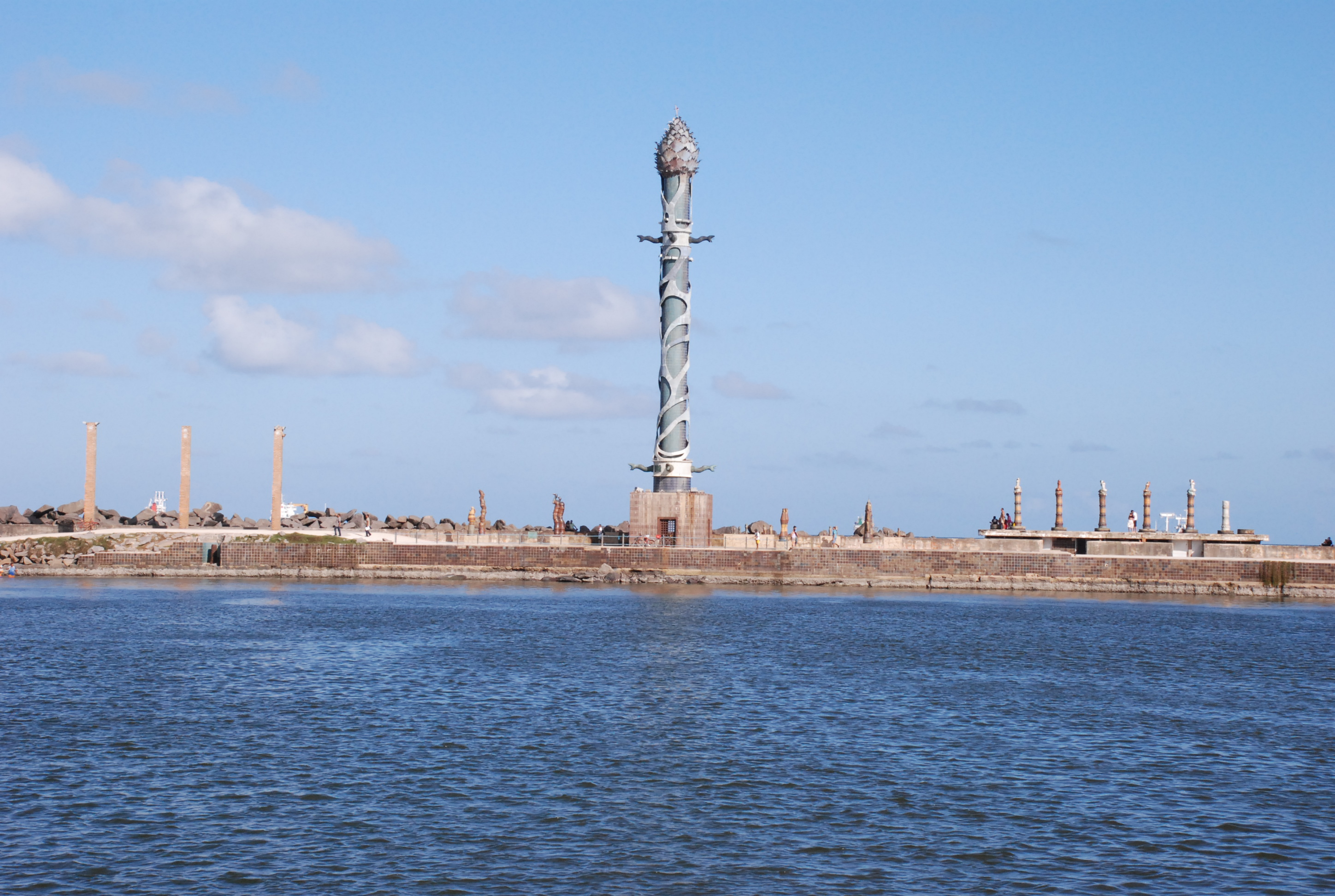
Torre de Cristal, a tower by Francisco Brennand at the Sculptures Park in Recife

Brennand primarily displayed his work at the Oficina Brennand, the compound encompassing the working tile factory, museum, chapel, and café. The Oficina features around 2,000 of Brennand's pieces in enormous open halls, outdoor monuments, alters, chapels, and gardens, all in the midst of an Atlantic forest reserve in the Varzea neighborhood of Recife. His work often returns to themes of the human body, eggs, animals, and fruit. At times, he was forced to defend his work against charges that it was too provocative or erotic. The New York Times called Brennand "the foremost artist in the city" and the Oficina Brennand "a metaphor for the city of Recife itself, consumed in simultaneous growth and decay." He has also been called "Brazil's greatest ceramicist."

More than 90 of his works, including the 32-meter Crystal Tower, can be seen at the Parque das esculturas (Sculptures Park), located in the Recife Antigo port district in Recife. The city commissioned this park in 2000 in celebration of the 500th anniversary of the arrival of Europeans in Brazil.
