= Malakoff Tower =

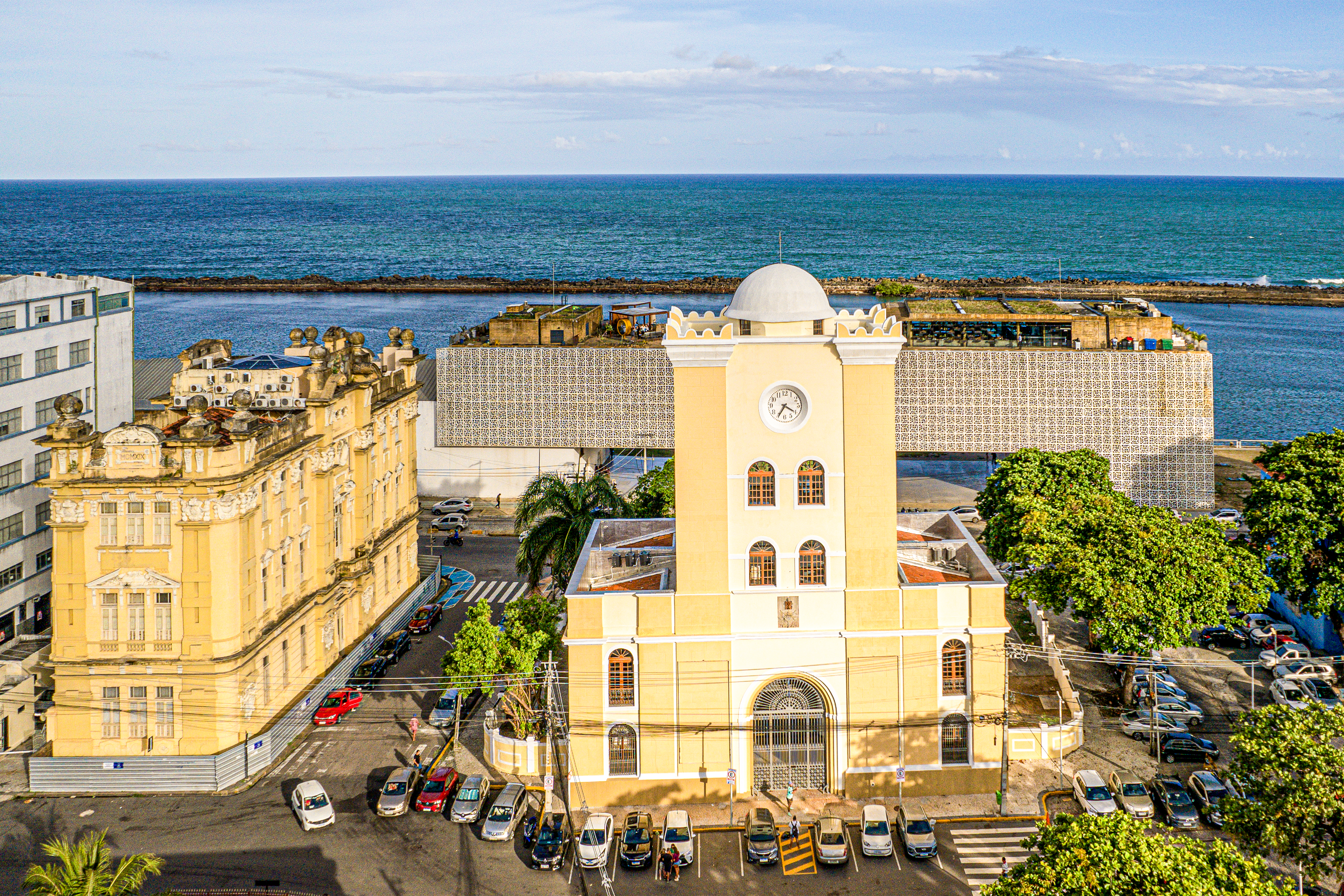
- Location: Recife, Pernambuco, Brazil
- Coordinates: 8°03′39″S 34°52′15″W
- Location of Malakoff Tower
- Related media on Commons

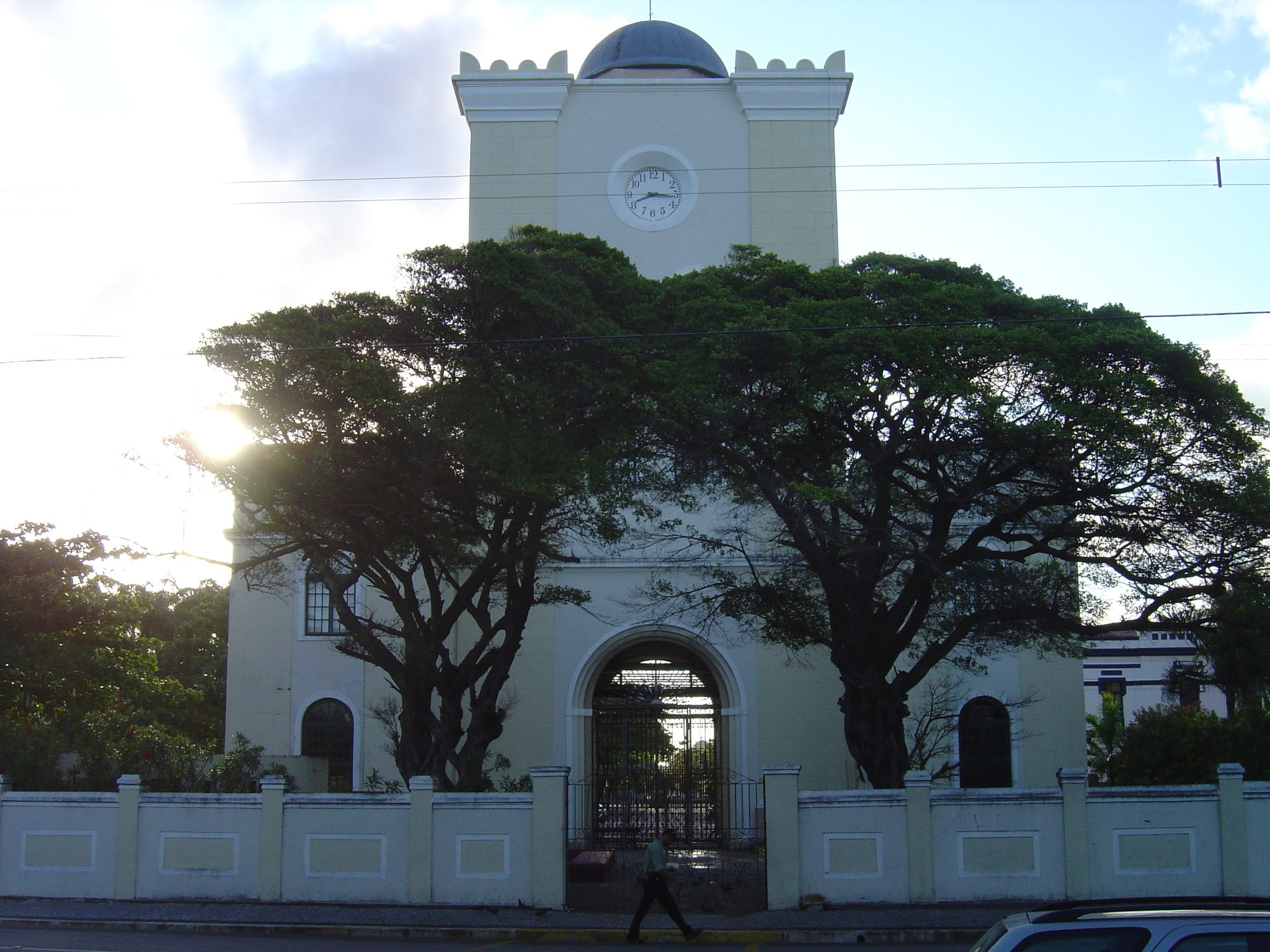
Back view

Malakoff Tower (Portuguese: Torre Malakoff) is a tower located in Recife Antigo, Recife. This monument was built between 1835 and 1855 to be used as an observatory and as the main entrance and gateway for Arsenal da Marinha (Navy Arsenals) square. It has been registered as a Historical Patrimony and was named after a similar monument on the Crimean peninsula, used as a defense center for Sevastopol on the Crimean War. When the arsenals of the Navy were dismantled with the beginning of the Brazilian Republic, the tower was transferred to the heritage of Recife port and then abandoned and endangered. The city population, in association with cultural institutions leadership, mobilized against the demolition, using as an example the real strength of Malakoff on the Crimean war.

The tower was renovated in 1999, keeping the old features of the Tunisian-style monument. Today, it is a cultural area and astronomical observatory:

- Cultural area – has the proposal involving science, art and technology. Works with exhibitions of photos, comics, among others and it is used to do popular manifestations as well.
- Astronomical observatory - it is one of the two astronomical observatories belonging to the space science museum. One here, at the Malakoff Tower, and the other one located in Olinda.

== Protected status ==
The Malakoff Tower is contributing property to the Architectural and Landscape Ensemble of Old Recife (Conjunto Arquitetônico, Urbanístico e Paisagístico do Antigo Bairro do Recife), listed by the National Institute of Historic and Artistic Heritage in 1998. It was individually listed as a state heritage site of Pernambuco.

== See also ==
- List of astronomical observatories
