= Zoo Botanical Park Dois Irmãos =

Coordinates: 8.01°S 34.947°W

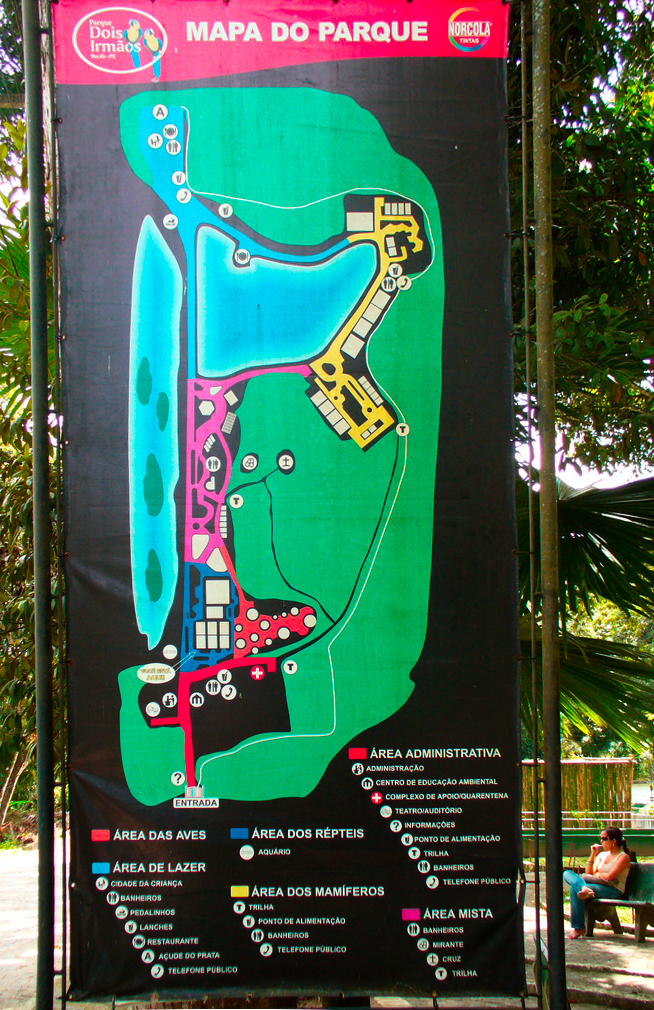
- Zoo map.
- Interactive map of Zoo Botanical Park Dois Irmãos
- Date opened: 1916
- Location: Recife, Pernambuco, Brazil
- Land area: 384.4 hectares (950 acres)
- No. of animals: 650
- No. of species: 120

The Zoo Botanical Park Dois Irmãos, is located in the city of Recife, state of Pernambuco - Brazil. The park has an area of 384.4 hectares (950 acres), 14 of which is dedicated for the Zoo Botanical and a Natural Science Museum, and the remaining area for an Atlantic Forest reserve (considered one of the largest atlantic forest area in the state). This park offers to the visitors the possibility to know about the local ecosystems, plants and wildlife. It has about 650 animals - birds, reptiles and mammals - from more than 120 species. It is the most representative Zoo in the North/Northeast region of Brazil, highlighted by events and pioneers innovative activities in areas such environmental education and breeding animals in captivity. Also in this park, nature knowledge is acquired through experience and direct contact with animals, making the Zoo no longer just a window of animals to become a Nature conservation center. The park was founded in 1916, in the land of engenho Dois Irmãos (which means two brothers), owned by Antonio and Tomas Lins Caldas.

== Description ==
- Zoo botanical - 140000 squaremeters (14 ha)
- Atlantic Forest reserve - 373.4 ha
- Natural Science Museum
- Ecological trails (by day or night)

== Location ==
- Farias Neves square, Dois Irmaos, CEP52171-011, Recife - Pernambuco

Sunday through Sunday - 8am/4pm
