= Geraldo Júlio =

Brazilian politician

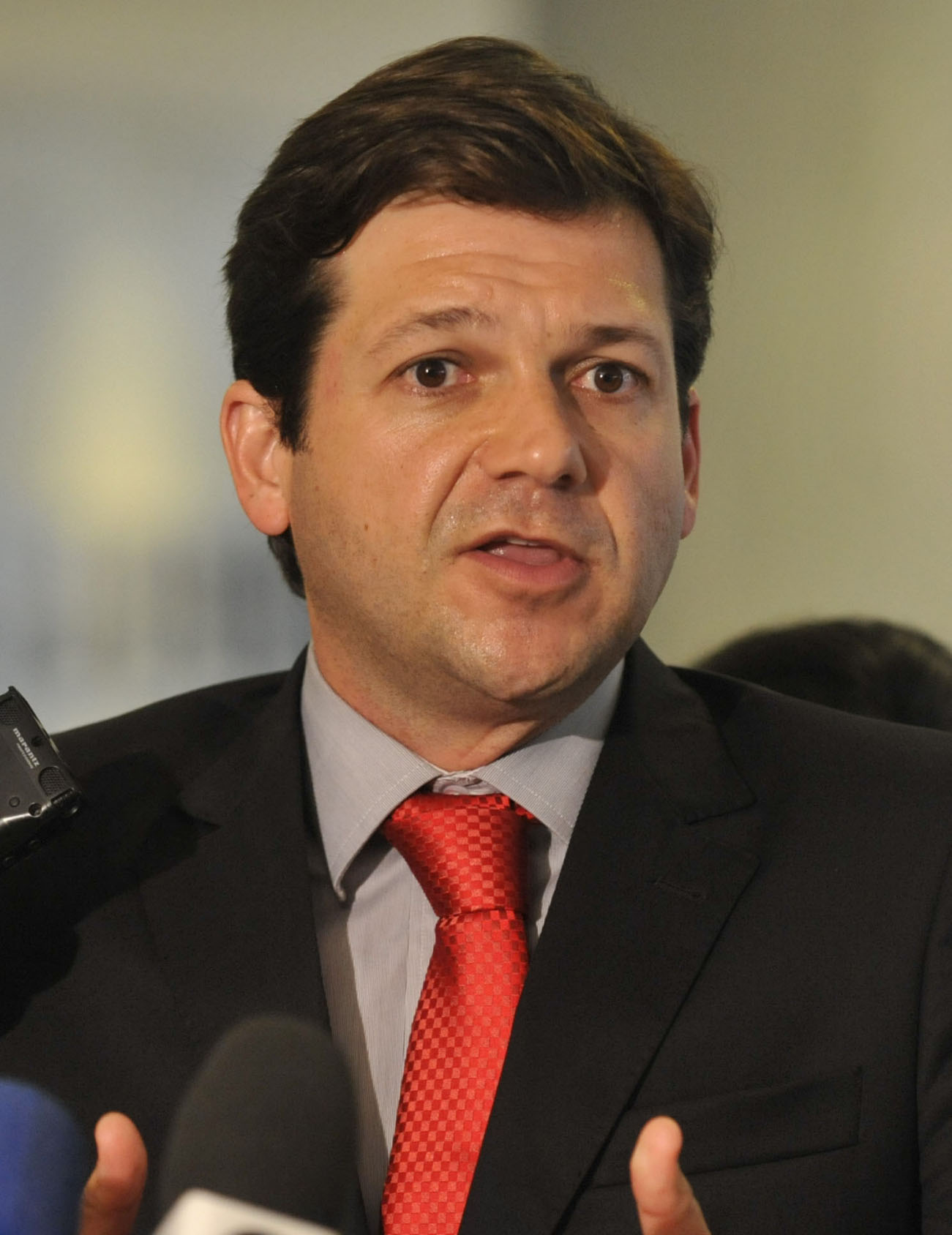
- Júlio in 2012

Mayor of Recife
- In office 1 January 2013 – 1 January 2021
- Deputy: Luciano Siqueira
- Preceded by: João da Costa
- Succeeded by: João Campos

Personal details
- Born: 19 March 1971 (age 55) Recife, Pernambuco, Brazil
- Party: PSB (2002–present)
- Education: Federal University of Pernambuco

Geraldo Júlio de Mello Filho (born 19 March 1971) is a Brazilian politician and a former mayor of Recife, Pernambuco. He is a member of the Brazilian Socialist Party.

== Political career ==
Geraldo Júlio de Mello Filho was born in Recife, he acted in the third term of Miguel Arraes's Government of Pernambuco and, in 2000, he was the director of planning of the Administration Secretary of the Prefecture of Recife. In Eduardo Campos' government, he assumed the office of Planning Secretary in 2007 and, four years later, he was State Secretary of Economic Development.

Júlio was a mayoral candidate in the 2012 municipal elections, being elected in the first round with 51,15% of the valid votes, and was re-elected in the 2016 elections.

== See also ==
- List of mayors of Recife

Political offices
Preceded by João da Costa Bezerra Filho	Mayor of Recife; 2013–21	Succeeded by João Henrique Campos
