= Jarbas Vasconcelos =

Brazilian politician and lawyer

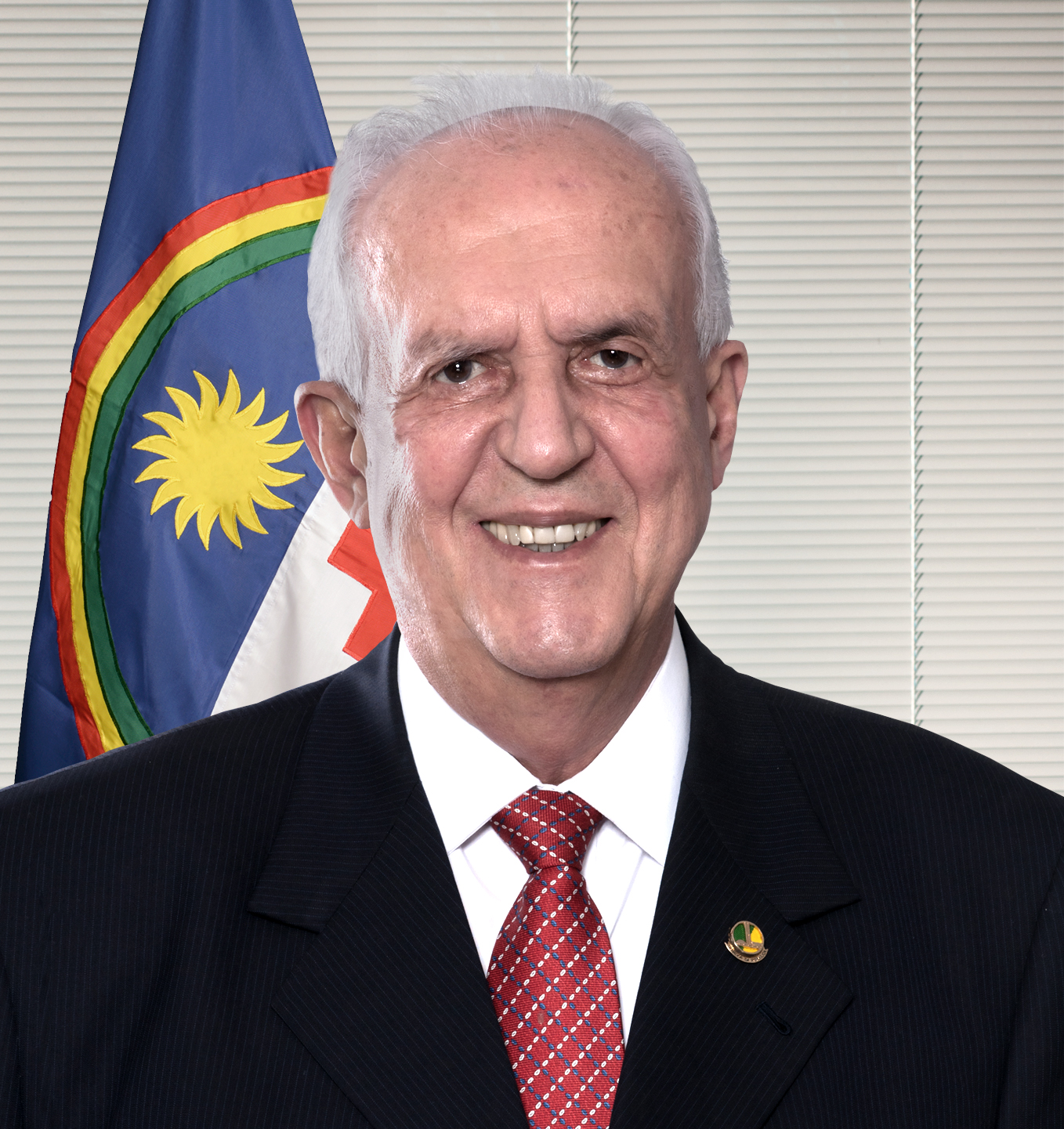
- Vasconcelos in 2019

Senator for Pernambuco
- In office 1 February 2019 – 5 September 2023
- Succeeded by: Fernando Dueire
- In office 1 February 2007 – 1 February 2015

Member of the Chamber of Deputies
- In office 1 February 2015 – 1 February 2019
- Constituency: Pernambuco
- In office 1 January 1983 – 1 January 1986
- Constituency: Pernambuco
- In office 1 January 1975 – 1 January 1979
- Constituency: Pernambuco

Governor of Pernambuco
- In office 1 January 1999 – 31 March 2006
- Vice Governor: Mendonça Filho
- Preceded by: Miguel Arraes
- Succeeded by: Mendonça Filho

Mayor of Recife
- In office 1 January 1993 – 1 January 1997
- Vice Mayor: Sílvio Pessoa de Carvalho
- Preceded by: Gilberto Marques Paulo
- Succeeded by: Roberto Magalhães
- In office 1 January 1986 – 1 January 1989
- Vice Mayor: José Carlos Melo
- Preceded by: Joaquim Francisco
- Succeeded by: Joaquim Francisco

Member of the Legislative Assembly of Pernambuco
- In office 1 February 1971 – 1 February 1975
- Constituency: At-large

Personal details
- Born: Jarbas de Andrade Vasconcelos; 23 August 1942 (age 84) Vicência, Pernambuco, Brazil
- Party: MDB (1986–present)
- Other political affiliations: MDB (1966–1985); PSB (1985–1986)
- Education: Catholic University of Pernambuco (LL.B.)
- Profession: Lawyer

Jarbas Vasconcelos (born 23 August 1942) is a Brazilian politician and lawyer. He represented Pernambuco in the Federal Senate from 2007 to 2015 and for a second term from 2019 to September 2023, when he officially resigned from office and retired from politics. Previously, he was governor of Pernambuco from 1999 to 2006. He is a member of the Brazilian Democratic Movement Party.

== Early life ==
Vasconcelos was born in Vicência on August 23, 1942, to Carlindo de Moraes Vasconcelos and Aurea de Andrade Vasconcelos. Along with his eight siblings, his family moved to Recife when he was seven.

== Education ==
After serving in the army for two years, Vasconcelos enrolled into the Catholic University of Pernambuco in 1964. he became interested in politics and joined the Brazilian Democratic Movement in 1966. He finished his Bachelor of Law degree two years later.

== See also ==
- List of mayors of Recife

Political offices
Preceded by Joaquim Francisco	Mayor of Recife; 1986–1989	Succeeded by Joaquim Francisco
Preceded by Gilberto Marques Paulo	Mayor of Recife; 1993–1997	Succeeded by Roberto Magalhães
Preceded by Miguel Arraes	Governor of Pernambuco; 1999–2006	Succeeded by Mendonça Filho
