= Recife Antigo =

Coordinates: 8°03′30″S 34°52′16″W

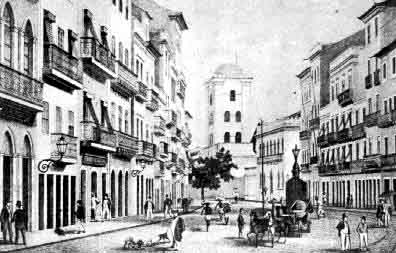
19th Century Lithograph of Rua do Bom Jesus in Recife Antigo

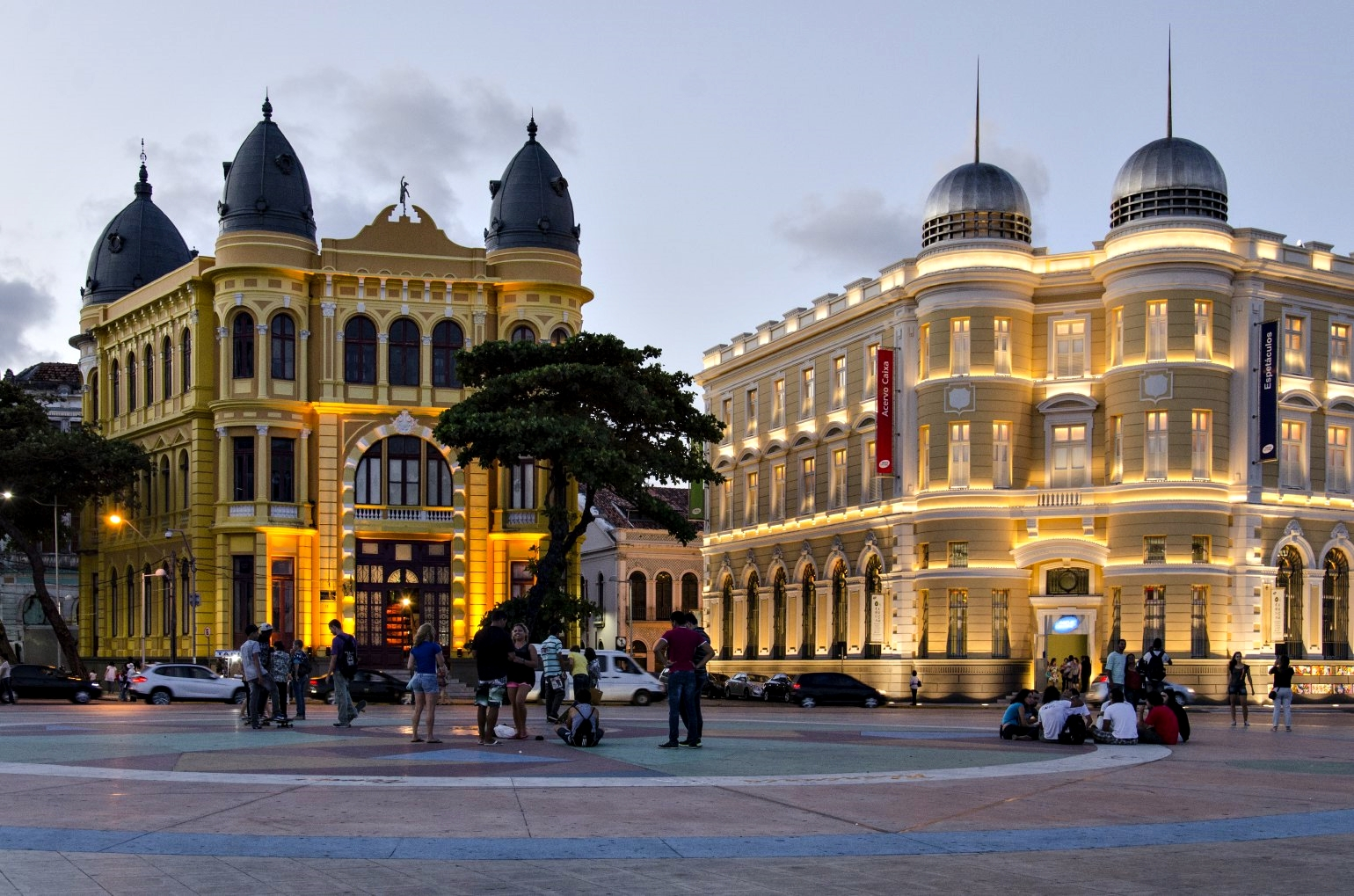
Marco Zero in Old Recife

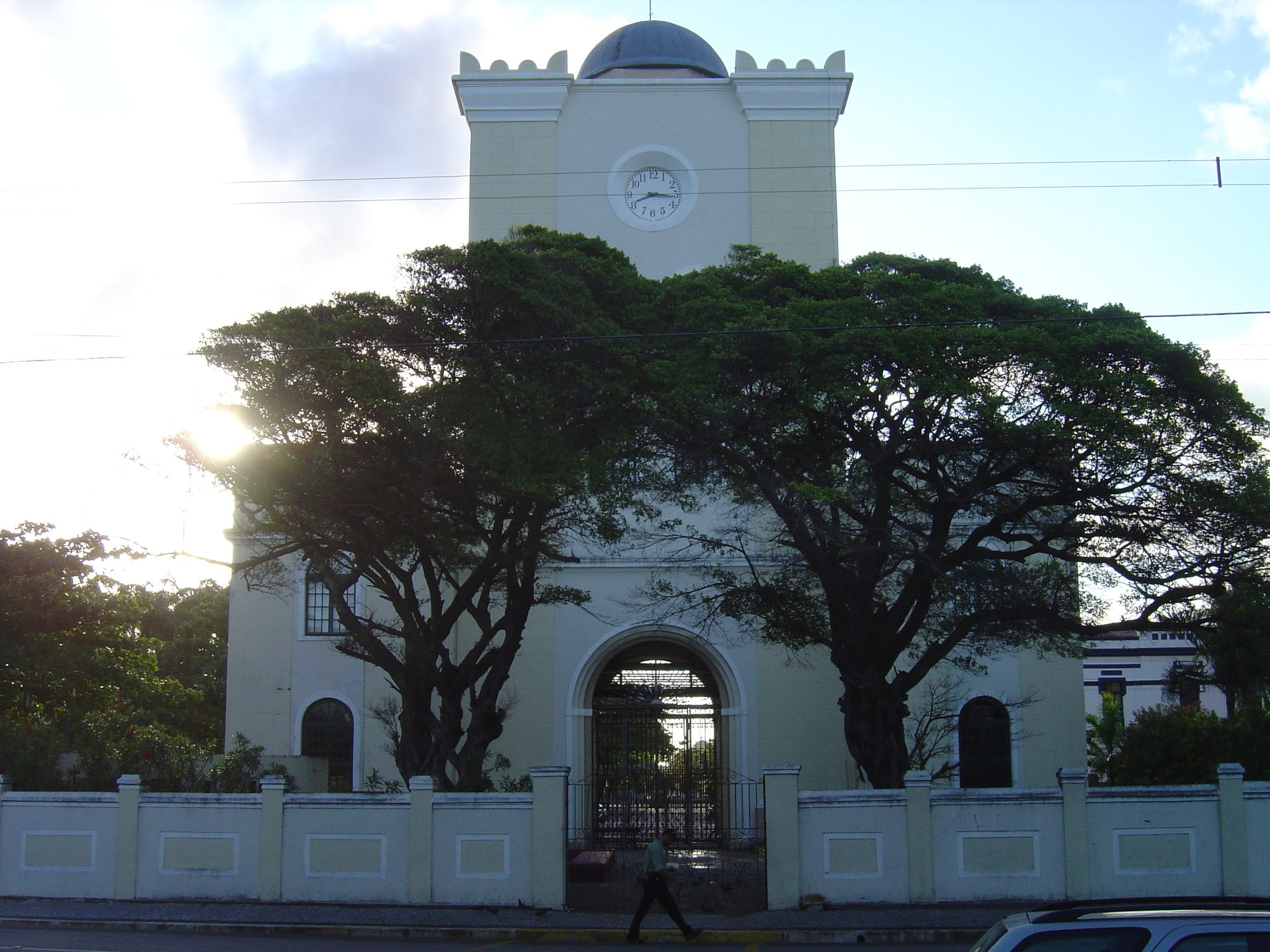
Malakoff Tower, in Recife Antigo

Recife Antigo (Old Recife) is the historical section of central Recife, Brazil. It is located on the Island of Recife, near the Recife harbor. This historic area has been recently recovered and now holds several clubs, bars and a high-tech center called Porto Digital.

== History ==
Recife Antigo consists of the initial Portuguese settlement in the 16th century around the port. Sugar cane production from Pernambuco was delivered to Portugal through Recife's port. While Recife had port functions, Olinda was the capital. In 1630, the Dutch invaded Pernambuco, set Olinda partially on fire and Recife became the seat of the Dutch government. Count John Maurice of Nassau-Siegen became Governor-General of the Dutch colony and built a new town on a neighboring island. This city was named Mauritsstadt and the Palácio do Campo das Princesas, seat of the State of Pernambuco government, is built on its ruins.

The Dutch were forced out in 1654 of a Recife with good infrastructure, for they had built canals and improved the port and the defenses of it. A flourishing Jewish community lived in Recife under them and they had to leave it because of the Portuguese Inquisition. Thus, a group of 24 Portuguese Jews who had previously migrated from Portugal to the Netherlands because of antisemitism, headed farther North with the Dutch, where New Amsterdam—present-day Manhattan—was founded. The first Synagogue built in the Americas, the Kahal Zur Israel Synagogue, is located in Recife Antigo, on Rua do Bom Jesus, formerly Rua dos Judeus, or Street of the Jews. The Portuguese synagogue was founded in lower Manhattan and it is located on Central Park West in Manhattan nowadays under the name Portuguese & Spanish synagogue.
