= Kahal Zur Israel Synagogue =

Former synagogue, now museum, in Recife, Brazil

- Hebrew: קהל צור ישראל; Portuguese: Sinagoga Kahal Zur Israel; Dutch: Synagoge Kahal Zur Israel
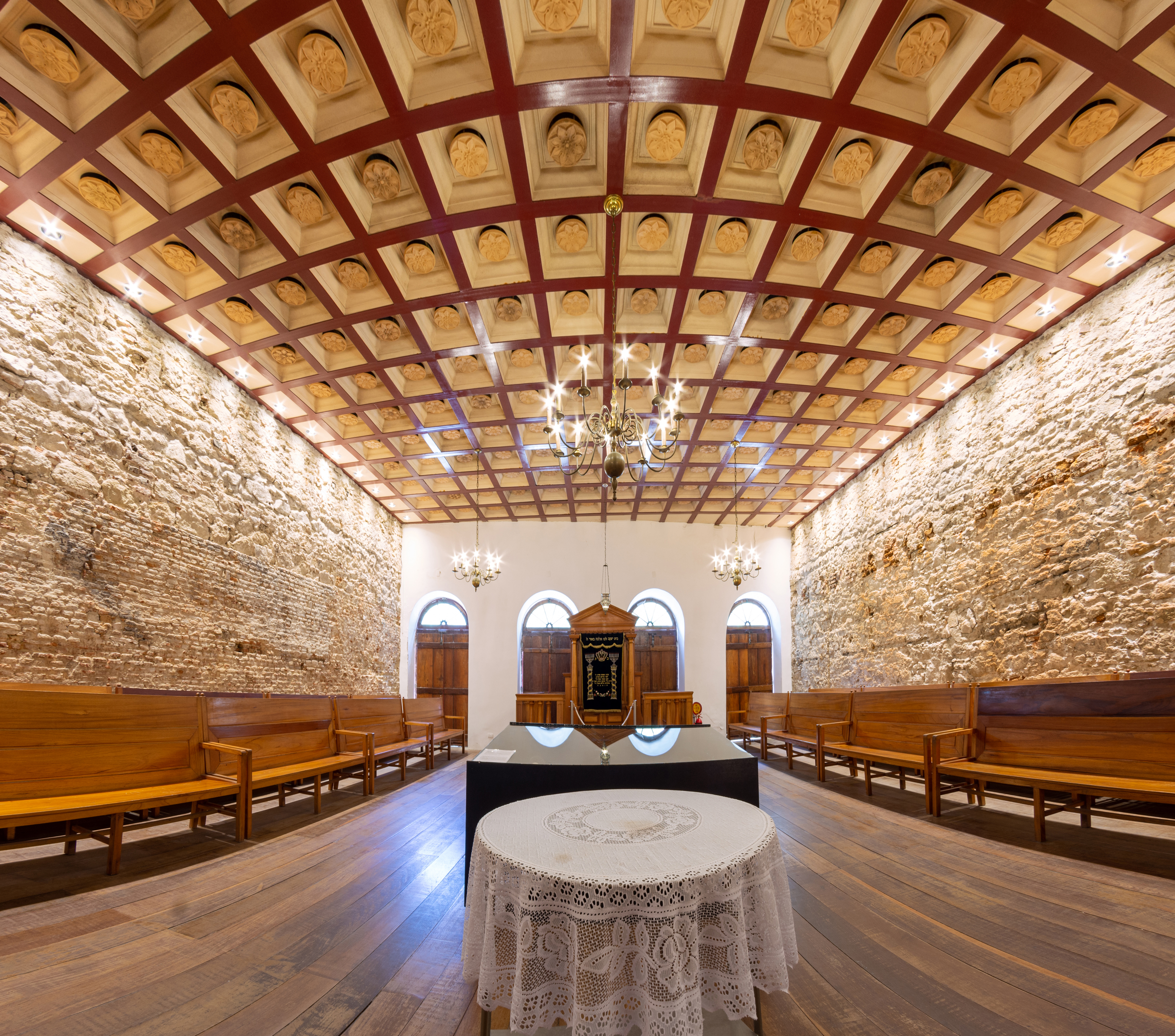
- Interior of the Jewish museum, in 2022

- Location of the former synagogue, now museum, in Brazil

Religion
- Affiliation: Judaism (former)
- Rite: Nusach Sefard
- Ecclesiastical or organisational status: Synagogue (1636–1654); Profane use (1654–early 20th century); House and shops (20th century); Jewish museum (since 2001)
- Status: Inactive (as a synagogue); Repurposed

Location
- Location: 197 Rua do Bom Jesus (Rua dos Judeus), Recife Antigo, Recife, Pernambuco
- Country: Brazil
- Coordinates: 8°03′41″S 34°52′17″W

Architecture
- Completed: 1636 (as a synagogue); Rebuilt (as a museum)
- Destroyed: c. early 20th century

The Kahal Zur Israel Synagogue (Hebrew: קהל צור ישראל, lit. 'Congregation Rock of Israel'; Portuguese: Sinagoga Kahal Zur Israel; Dutch: Synagoge Kahal Zur Israel) was a former Jewish synagogue, located at 197 Rua do Bom Jesus (Rua dos Judeus), in the old city of Recife, in the state of Pernambuco, in northeastern Brazil.

The synagogue was established in 1636 by Portuguese and Spanish Sephardic Jews who had taken refuge in Dutch Brazil, fleeing forced conversion, and were joined by New Christians, who possibly helped to build the structure and were already living in the colony. It was the first synagogue erected in the Americas. The building was destroyed in the early part of the 20th century and a new building constructed on the same site, that now serves as a Jewish museum. The museum features a Torah and bema, as well as archeological excavations displaying various parts of the original synagogue, such as the mikveh. (Note: Also published in Haaretz with the title "Synagogue in Brazilian Town Recife Considered Oldest in the Americas: Historians gradually unveil prominent role Jews had in history of Brazil, the world's largest Catholic nation".)

== History ==
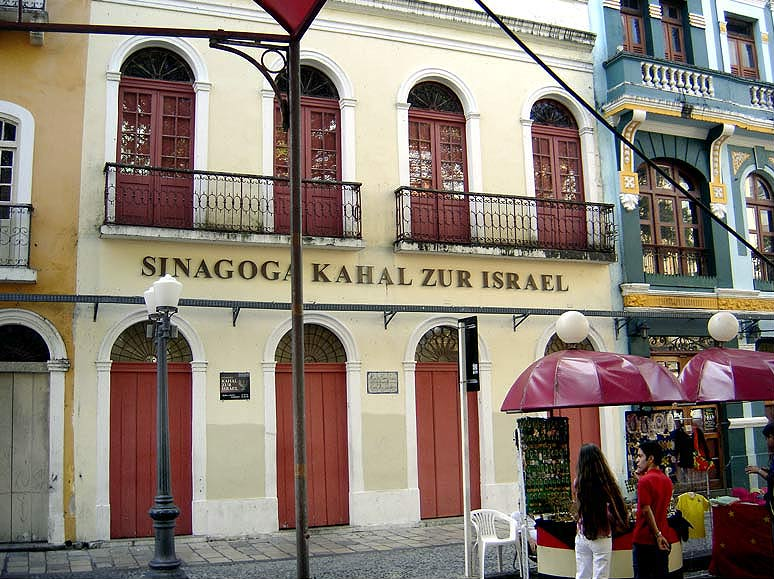
The exterior of the museum, in 2006

In 1630, Moses Cohen Henriques led a Jewish contingent to Itamaracá, an island off Brazil. From there they settled in Recife. After his retirement circa 1636 from privateering for the Dutch and perhaps pirating, Cohen Henriques assisted his brother, Abraham Cohen, in establishing the Kahal Zur Israel synagogue. It is perhaps one of the only synagogues to have been partially established by a pirate.

From 1636 to 1654, the synagogue functioned on the site of the houses no. 197 and 203 Rua do Bom Jesus (formerly Rua dos Judeus, lit. 'Street of the Jews'). It flourished in the mid-17th century when the Dutch briefly controlled this part of northeastern Brazil. The synagogue then served a community of approximately 1,450 Jews. It had a cantor, Josue Velosino, and a rabbi, Isaac Aboab da Fonseca, sent to Recife in 1642. In 1654, the Dutch surrendered to the Portuguese, only after the Jews were guaranteed safe passage from the colony, evading Portuguese persecution. Aboab da Fonseca and Cohen Henriques, as well as most of the Jews of the Dutch colony, left. (Note: Sourced boy the author.)

The original synagogue structure survived until the early 20th century when it was torn down. The site has been confirmed by an archaeological excavation. In 2001 the decision was made to create a Jewish museum in the two-story house with two shops located on the first floor then standing on the site of the old synagogue.

=== Present day ===
The Jewish museum, designed to resemble synagogues built in the 17th and 18th centuries by Sephardic Jews from Spain and Portugal, opened in 2001. Today, there are four synagogues in Recife. Many Jews choose to celebrate their weddings and Bnei Mitzvot celebrations in the Kahal Zur Israel because of its symbolism as a connection to their long history in the country. The synagogue is also at the center of a broader cultural renaissance. Every November, a Jewish festival offering dance, cinema, and food, from gefilte fish to fluden, attracts around 20,000 visitors to the synagogue and the Rua do Bom Jesus (Rua dos Judeus).
