= Santa Isabel Theater =

Theater in Recife, Brazil

- Teatro de Santa Isabel
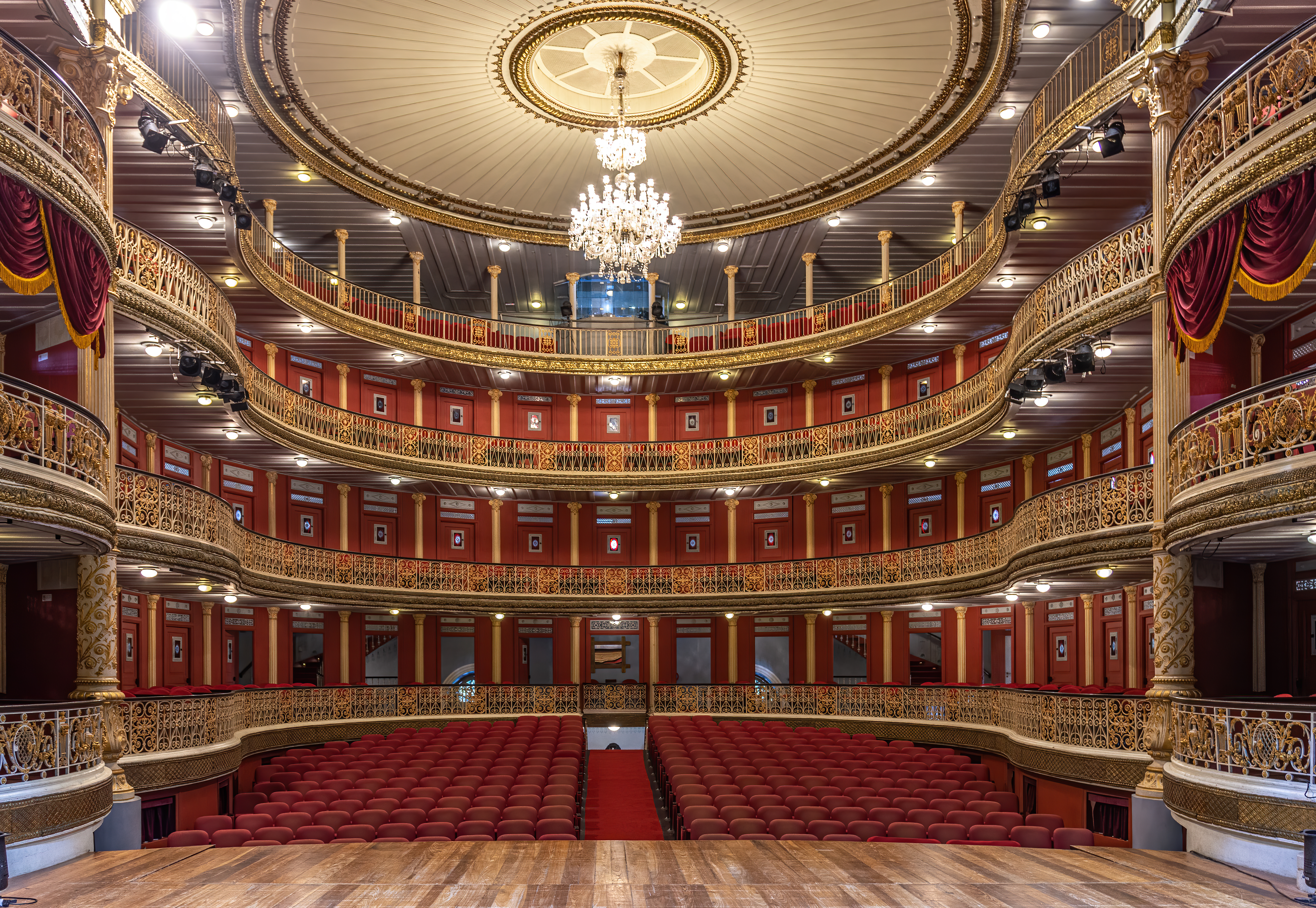
- Interior of Santa Isabel Theater

General information
- Coordinates: 8°03′38.54″S 34°52′42.38″W
- Named for: Princess Isabel of Braganza
- Inaugurated: 18 May 1850

Santa Isabel Theater (Teatro de Santa Isabel in Portuguese) is located in the Brazilian city of Recife, capital of Pernambuco state.

It was inaugurated on 18 May 1850, and seats 850 in the audience. It was named in honor of Princess Isabel of Braganza. Important artistic and political figures passed through the theater in the nineteenth century, including Castro Alves, Joaquim Nabuco and Emperor Pedro II of Brazil.

The theater is located in Republic Square (Praça da República) in the district of Santo Antônio. It is adjacent to the Princesses Field Palace (residency of Pernambuco state governors) and the Pernambuco Justice Palace. The theater houses the Recife Symphony Orchestra.
