= List of paintings by Frans Post =

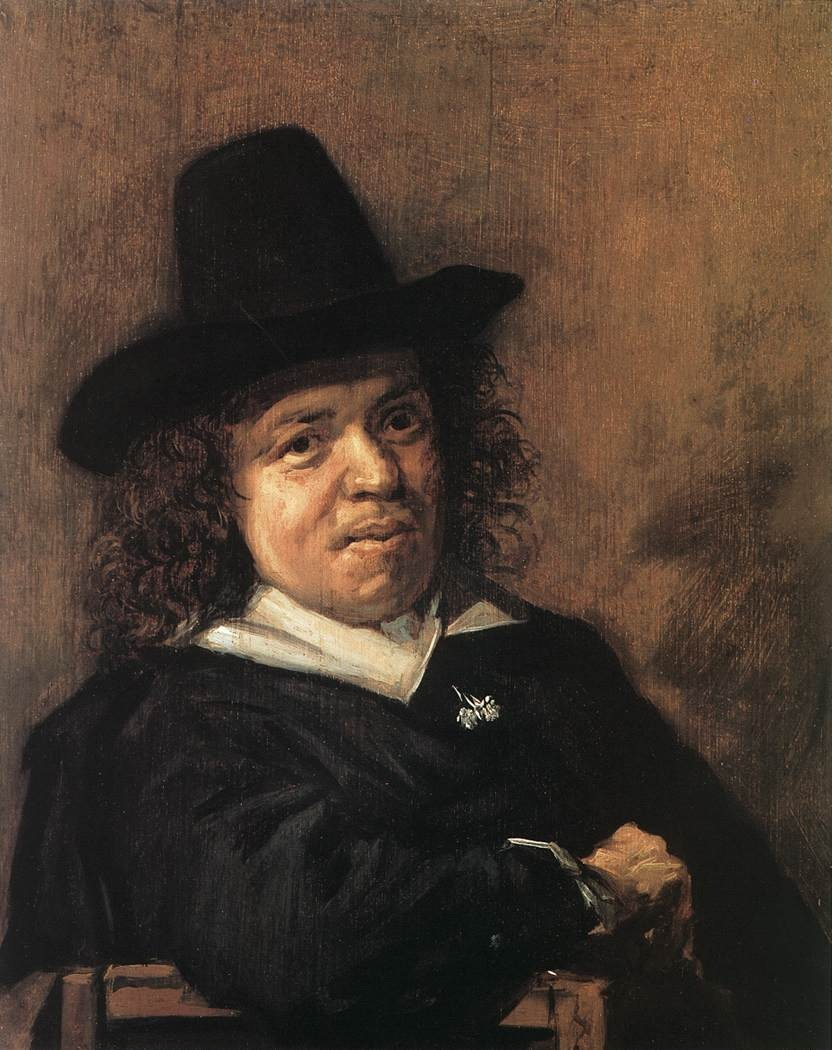
Portrait of Frans Post (c. 1655), by Frans Hals (Worcester Art Museum).

This article lists paintings by Frans Post (1612–1680), a Dutch Golden Age artist who was the first European to paint landscapes of the Americas. Frans Post disembarked in Brazil in 1637, following the retinue of John Maurice, Prince of Nassau-Siegen, who had recently been appointed as the governor of the Dutch possessions in Northeast Brazil by the Dutch West India Company. Along with Albert Eckhout and Zacharias Wagener, Post was in charge of documenting the new Dutch colonies in South America, but while his companions were devoted to depicting the Brazilian flora, fauna, and people, he focused exclusively on the landscapes of the so-called "New Holland".

Frans Post returned to Europe in 1644, after producing a limited number of in loco artworks, of which only seven have survived. Nevertheless, the exoticism of his landscapes, rich in tropical details yet unknown to the European public, soon attracted the attention of new clients. As a result, Post would devote the rest of his artistic career to the production of paintings with Brazilian themes, based on the sketches and drawings of what he had observed onsite. Post's known output numbers about 160 paintings, practically all of them of Brazilian landscapes. With one known exception he did not date his paintings, making it difficult to establish a precise timeline of his production. A large part of his oeuvre is currently housed in Brazilian museums and collections (Ricardo Brennand Institute in Recife, National Museum of Fine Arts in Rio de Janeiro, São Paulo Museum of Art, etc.), but several examples of his works may be found around the world, mainly in Europe (Louvre, Rijksmuseum) and the United States. In the following list, artworks are presented in loose chronological order.

== Paintings ==
Image	Title	Date	Medium and size	Other information	Collection / Location
	View of the Island of Itamaracá, Brazil	1637	Oil on canvas, 63.5 × 89.5 cm		Rijksmuseum, Amsterdam (on loan to the Mauritshuis, The Hague) (Netherlands)
	The Old Portuguese Forte dos Reis Magos, or Fort Ceulen, at the Mouth of the Rio Grande	1638	Oil on canvas, 62 × 95 cm		Louvre, Paris (France)
	The Ox Cart — Brazilian Landscape	1638	Oil on canvas, 61 × 88 cm		Louvre, Paris (France)
	View of Frederiksstad in Paraíba, Brazil	1638	Oil on canvas, 61 × 91.4 cm		Fundación Cisneros, Caracas (Venezuela)
	The Rio São Francisco and Fort Maurits, with a Capybara in the Foreground	1639	Oil on canvas, 62 × 95 cm		Louvre, Paris (France)
	Landscape near Porto Calvo, with a Fig Tree in the Foreground	1639	Oil on panel, 63 × 89 cm		Louvre, Paris (France)
	Fort Fredrik Hendrik	1640	Oil on canvas, 66 x 88 cm	Signed and dated ("F. Post 1640").	Instituto Ricardo Brennand, Recife (Brazil)
	Landscape of Pernambuco	c. 1644–1659	Oil on panel, 34.3 × 47.3 cm	Unsigned.	Museu Nacional de Belas Artes, Rio de Janeiro (Brazil)
	Church of Saints Cosmas and Damian in Igarassu	c. 1644–1659	Oil on panel, 33.4 × 41.4 cm	Signed ("F. Post").	Museu Nacional de Belas Artes, Rio de Janeiro (Brazil)
	A village in Brazil	c. 1645–1680	Oil on panel, 51.1 x 59.1 cm		Royal Collection, London (United Kingdom)
	Brazilian landscape with Manoah's sacrifice	1648	Oil on canvas, 167 x 193 cm		Museum Boijmans Van Beuningen, Rotterdam (Netherlands)
	Brazilian landscape with anteater	1649	Oil on canvas, 53 × 69.4 cm		Alte Pinakothek, Munich (Germany)
	Brazilian landscape with an armadillo	1649	Oil on canvas, 53 x 69 cm		Alte Pinakothek, Munich (Germany)
	Paulo Afonso Falls	1649	Oil on panel, 58.5 × 46 cm	Signed and dated ("F. Post 1649").	Museu de Arte de São Paulo, São Paulo (Brazil)
	Brazilian landscape	1650	Oil, unknown dimensions		Nederlands Scheepvaartmuseum, Amsterdam (Netherlands)
	A Brazilian landscape	1650	Oil on panel, 61 x 91.4 cm		Metropolitan Museum of Art, New York (United States)
	View of Olinda	c. 1650	Oil on canvas, 90 × 122 cm		Fundação Cultural Ema Gordon Klabin, São Paulo (Brazil)
	Ruins of the Mother Church of Olinda	mid-17th century	Oil on canvas, 67.5 x 86.5 cm		Private collection, Rio de Janeiro (Brazil)
	Landscape with chapel	mid-17th century	Oil on panel, 43.5 x 58.7 cm	.	Fundación Cisneros, Caracas (Venezuela)
	Lowlands	mid-17th century	Oil on panel, 38 × 57.2 cm	Unsigned.	Museu Nacional de Belas Artes, Rio de Janeiro (Brazil)
	Sugar mill	mid-17th century	Oil on canvas, 90.8 × 115.5 cm	Unsigned. Contested authorship.	Museu Nacional de Belas Artes, Rio de Janeiro (Brazil)
	Village on a wooded plain	mid-17th century	Oil on panel, 46 × 75 cm		Itaú Unibanco collection, São Paulo (Brazil)
	Landscape of Paraíba – Sugar mill with a river	mid-17th century	Oil on panel, 93 x 79cm		Palácio Laranjeiras, Rio de Janeiro (Brazil)
	Landscape	mid-17th century	Oil on panel, 22.5 × 32.5 cm		Museu do Estado de Pernambuco, Recife (Brazil)
	Landscape	mid-17th century	Oil on panel, 22.5 × 32.5 cm		Museu do Estado de Pernambuco, Recife (Brazil)
	Franciscan monastery in Igaraçu	mid-17th century	Oil on panel, 48 x 70 cm		Historisches Museum, Frankfurt (Germany)
	Sugar mill in Pernambuco	17th century	Oil on panel, 50 × 74.5 cm		Palácio Itamaraty, Brasília (Brazil)
	Village and a coconut tree	17th century	Oil on canvas, 50.5 x 68 cm	Signed ("F.Post").	Beatriz and Mário Pimenta Camargo collection, São Paulo (Brazil)
	Brazilian landscape with a procession of blacks	17th century	Oil on panel, 48 x 65 cm		Beatriz and Mário Pimenta Camargo collection, São Paulo (Brazil)
	Village	17th century	Oil on canvas, 43.5 x 67 cm		Beatriz and Mário Pimenta Camargo collection, São Paulo (Brazil)
	Church of Saints Cosmas and Damian in Igarassu	17th century	Oil on panel, 39 × 48.5 cm		Fundação Cultural Ema Gordon Klabin, São Paulo (Brazil)
	Sugar mill	17th century	Oil on canvas, 67 × 89 cm		Museu da Chácara do Céu, Rio de Janeiro (Brazil)
	Brazilian Landscape with the Monastery of Igaraçú	17th century	Oil on panel, 55 x 69 cm		Gemäldegalerie, Berlin (Germany)
	View of Olinda	c. 1650–1655	Oil on panel, 79 x 111.5 cm	Signed ("F. Post").	Museu Nacional de Belas Artes, Rio de Janeiro (Brazil)
	Ruins of the Mother Church of Olinda	c. 1650–1655	Oil on panel, 45 x 70 cm		Fundação Maria Luisa e Oscar Americano, São Paulo (Brazil)
	A Monastery of the Capuchin Fathers — The House of a Portuguese Nobleman	c. 1650–1655	Oil on canvas, 101 x 136 cm		Louvre, Paris (France)
	A Sugar Mill Driven by a Small River	c. 1650–1655	Oil on canvas, 117 x 167 cm		Louvre, Paris (France)
	The Home of a "Labrador" (Sugar Cane Planter) in Brazil (or The Village of Serinhaem)	c. 1650–1655	Oil on canvas, 112 x 146 cm		Louvre, Paris (France)
	Three Different Houses, or "Homes of the Labradores who Plant Sugar"	c. 1650–1655	Oil on canvas, 104x 130 cm		Louvre, Paris (France)
	Landscape in Brazil	1652	Oil on canvas, 282.5 × 210.5 cm		Rijksmuseum, Amsterdam (Netherlands)
	Brazilian landscape ("Hacienda")	c. 1652	Oil on panel, 45 × 65 cm		Landesmuseum Mainz, Mainz (Germany)
	View of Mauritsstad and Recife	c. 1653	Oil on panel, 48.2 x 83.6 cm		Private collection, São Paulo (Brazil)
	Settlement in Brazil	1654	Oil on panel, 51 x 70 cm		Nederlands Scheepvaartmuseum, Amsterdam (Netherlands)
	Wall with horses and slaves	c. 1655	Oil on panel, 19.5 x 19.5 cm	Unsigned. Probably a fragment of a larger painting.	Instituto Ricardo Brennand, Recife (Brazil)
	Brazilian landscape with a worker's house	c. 1655	Oil on panel, 47 × 62.9 cm		Los Angeles County Museum of Art, Los Angeles (United States)
	Brazilian landscape with a house under construction	c. 1655–1660	Oil on panel, 46 x 70 cm		Mauritshuis, The Hague (Netherlands)
	Brazilian landscape	1656	Oil on panel, 41 x 59 cm		Frans Hals Museum, Haarlem (Netherlands)
	Plantation settlement in Brazil	1656	Oil on panel, 36.9 x 54 cm		Carmen Thyssen-Bornemisza collection, on deposit at the Museo Thyssen-Bornemisza, Madrid (Spain)
	Brazilian landscape	1656	Oil on panel, 59 × 94 cm		Wadsworth Atheneum, Hartford, Connecticut (United States)
	Waterfall in the forest	1657	Oil on panel, 47 x 44 cm	Signed and dated ("F. Post 1657).	Instituto Ricardo Brennand, Recife (Brazil)
	River crossing the lowlands	1658	Oil on canvas, 62 x 87,5 cm	Signed and dated ("F. Post 1658).	Beatriz and Mário Pimenta Camargo collection, São Paulo (Brazil)
	Brazilian landscape with the village of Igaraçú. To the left the church of Sts Cosmas and Damian	1659	Oil on panel, 40 × 61 cm		Rijksmuseum, Amsterdam (Netherlands)
	Lowlands	1659	Oil on panel, 39 x 60 cm	Signed and dated ("F. Post 1659).	Instituto Ricardo Brennand, Recife (Brazil)
	Huts	1659	Oil on panel, 34 × 51 cm	Signed and dated ("F. Post 1659").	Museu Nacional de Belas Artes, Rio de Janeiro (Brazil)
	Village in the interior of Pernambuco	1660	Oil on panel, 55 x 84 cm		Fundação Maria Luisa e Oscar Americano, São Paulo (Brazil)
	Landscape in Brazil with Sugar Plantation	1660	Oil on canvas, 87 x 113 cm		Statens Museum for Kunst, Copenhagen (Denmark)
	View of a sugar mill	c. 1660	Oil on panel, 25.7 × 41.4 cm	Signed ("F. Post").	Museu Nacional de Belas Artes, Rio de Janeiro (Brazil)
	Landscape with a boa	c. 1660	Oil on canvas, 119 × 172 cm	Signed ("F. Post").	Museu de Arte de São Paulo, São Paulo (Brazil)
	Landscape	c. 1660	Oil on panel, 20 × 30 cm	Unsigned.	Instituto Ricardo Brennand, Recife (Brazil)
	Village of Olinda, Brazil	c. 1660	Oil on canvas, 82.5 × 130.81 cm		Chazen Museum of Art, Madison, Wisconsin (United States)
	The Sugar Factory and Plantation of Engenho Real	c. 1660	Oil on panel, 71.5 x 91.5 cm		Museum Boijmans Van Beuningen, Rotterdam (Netherlands)
	Landscape with an antbear	after 1660	Oil on panel, 56 x 79 cm	Signed ("F. Post").	Museu de Arte de São Paulo, São Paulo (Brazil)
	Rural landscape	c. 1660–1667	Oil on panel, 30 x 37 cm	Possibly a pendant of Ruins of Olinda, housed in the same collection.	Fundação Maria Luisa e Oscar Americano, São Paulo (Brazil)
	Ruins of Olinda	c. 1660–1667	Oil on panel, 30 x 37 cm	Possibly a pendant of Rural landscape, housed in the same collection.	Fundação Maria Luisa e Oscar Americano, São Paulo (Brazil)
	Landscape with river and forest	c. 1660–1667	Oil on panel, 63 × 93 cm		Fundação Maria Luisa e Oscar Americano, São Paulo (Brazil)
	Landscape with a front porch house	c. 1660–1667	Oil on panel, 21 × 26.5 cm		Fundação Maria Luisa e Oscar Americano, São Paulo (Brazil)
	Waterfall with indians	c. 1660–1667	Oil on panel, 30 x 35 cm		Fundação Maria Luisa e Oscar Americano, São Paulo (Brazil)
	River and village landscape	c. 1660–1669	Oil on panel, 35 x 89 cm	Signed ("F. Post").	Instituto Ricardo Brennand, Recife (Brazil)
	Sugar mill	c. 1660–1669	Oil on panel, 50 x 69 cm	Signed ("F. Post"). Pendant of Village and chapel with portico, housed in the same collection.	Instituto Ricardo Brennand, Recife (Brazil)
	Village and chapel with portico	c. 1660–1669	Oil on panel, 50 x 69 cm	Signed ("F. Post"). Pendant of Sugar mill, housed in the same collection.	Instituto Ricardo Brennand, Recife (Brazil)
	Village and chapel with portico	c. 1660–1669	Oil on canvas, 54.5 x 70 cm	Signed ("F. Post").	Instituto Ricardo Brennand, Recife (Brazil)
	View of the area around Olinda	c. 1660–1670	Oil on panel, 43.7 x 59 cm		Staatsgalerie Stuttgart, Stuttgart (Germany)
	Brazilian landscape	c. 1660–1670	Oil on panel, 48.3 x 62.2 cm	Signed ("F. Post").	National Gallery of Ireland, Dublin (Republic of Ireland)
	The Church of St. Cosmas and St. Damian and The Franciscan Monastery at Igaraçu, Brazil	c. 1660–1680	Oil on panel, 2.8 x 58.8 cm		Carmen Thyssen-Bornemisza collection, on deposit at the Museo Thyssen-Bornemisza, Madrid (Spain)
	Sugar plantation	1661	Oil on panel, 43 x 48cm		Beatriz and Mário Pimenta Camargo collection, São Paulo (Brazil)
	View of Olinda, Brazil	1662	Oil on canvas, 107.5 × 172.5 cm		Rijksmuseum, Amsterdam (Netherlands)
	Brazilian landscape or Rural landscape in Brazil	1664	Oil on panel, 34.3 x 41.3 cm		John and Mable Ringling Museum of Art, Sarasota, Florida, (United States)
	Landscape with ruins of Olinda	1664	Oil on panel, 34.3 x 47.7 cm	Signed and dated ("F. Post 1664").	Instituto Ricardo Brennand, Recife (Brazil)
	Ruins of the Mother Church of Olinda	c. 1665	Oil on canvas, 86 x 114 cm		Instituto Histórico e Geográfico Brasileiro, Rio de Janeiro (Brazil)
	Brazilian landscape	1665	Oil on canvas, 56.2 x 83.5 cm		Detroit Institute of Arts, Detroit (United States)
	Brazilian landscape	1665	Oil on canvas, 46.8 × 62.1 cm		Herbert F. Johnson Museum of Art, Ithaca, New York (United States)
	Landscape of Pernambuco with manor house	1665	Oil on panel, 59 x 94 cm	Signed and dated ("F. Post 1665").	Museu de Arte de São Paulo, São Paulo (Brazil)
	Landscape with large tree to the right	1665	Oil on panel, 34 x 47 cm	Signed and dated ("F. Post 1665").	Instituto Ricardo Brennand, Recife (Brazil)
	Landscape of Paraíba	1665	Oil on panel, 45 x 53 cm	Signed ("F. Post").	Museu Nacional de Belas Artes, Rio de Janeiro (Brazil)
	View of the Ruins of Olinda, Brazil	1665	Oil on canvas, 79.8 x 111.4 cm		Museo Thyssen-Bornemisza, Madrid (Spain)
	Landscape in Brazil	c. 1665–1669	Oil on canvas, 66 x 88 cm		Rijksmuseum, Amsterdam (Netherlands)
	Sugar mill with a chapel	1667	Oil on panel, 41 × 53 cm		Fundação Maria Luisa e Oscar Americano São Paulo (Brazil)
	Landscape of Pernambuco – Indians hunting and fighting	1667	Oil on panel, 57.8 x 72.5 cm		Palácio Laranjeiras Rio de Janeiro (Brazil)
	Ipojuca Village	1667	Oil on canvas, 45 × 59.7 cm		Coleção de Arte da Cidade de São Paulo (on loan to the Pinacoteca do Estado de São Paulo), São Paulo (Brazil)
	Manor house on the lowlands	1667	Oil on canvas, 60 x 90 cm	Signed and dated ("F.Post 1667").	Beatriz and Mário Pimenta Camargo collection, São Paulo (Brazil)
	Brazilian landscape	1667	Oil on panel, 50 x 69 cm		Joods Historisch Museum, Amsterdam (Netherlands)
	River landscape in Pernambuco	1668	Oil on panel, 47 x 55 cm	Signed and dated ("1668 – F. Post").	Museu de Arte de São Paulo, São Paulo (Brazil)
	Sugar mill	c. 1670	Oil on canvas, 52.5 x 66 cm	Unsigned.	Instituto Ricardo Brennand, Recife (Brazil)
	Landscape on the Rio Senhor de Engenho, Brazil	c. 1670–1680	Oil on panel, 22.5 × 28 cm		Rijksmuseum, Amsterdam (Netherlands)
	Brazilian landscape	c. 1670–1680	Oil on panel, 22.5 × 28 cm		Rijksmuseum, Amsterdam (Netherlands)
	Village with church	c. 1670–1680	Oil on panel, 30 x 39.5 cm	Signed ("F. Post").	Instituto Ricardo Brennand, Recife (Brazil)
	Village	c. 1670–1680	Oil on panel, 54.9 x 62.9 cm	Signed ("F. Post").	Instituto Ricardo Brennand, Recife (Brazil)
	Northeastern Landscape	c. 1670–1680	Oil on panel, 7.9 x 11.4 cm	Signed ("F. Post").	Instituto Ricardo Brennand, Recife (Brazil)
	Church Building in Brazil	c. 1675–1680	Oil on panel, 16.5 × 25 cm		Rijksmuseum, Amsterdam (Netherlands)
	Brazilian Village	c. 1675–1680	Oil on panel, 20.5 × 26.5 cm		Rijksmuseum, Amsterdam (Netherlands)

== See also ==
- Brazilian painting
- Dutch Brazil
- Dutch Golden Age painting
