= Ricardo Brennand =

Brazilian art collector and entrepreneur (1927–2020)

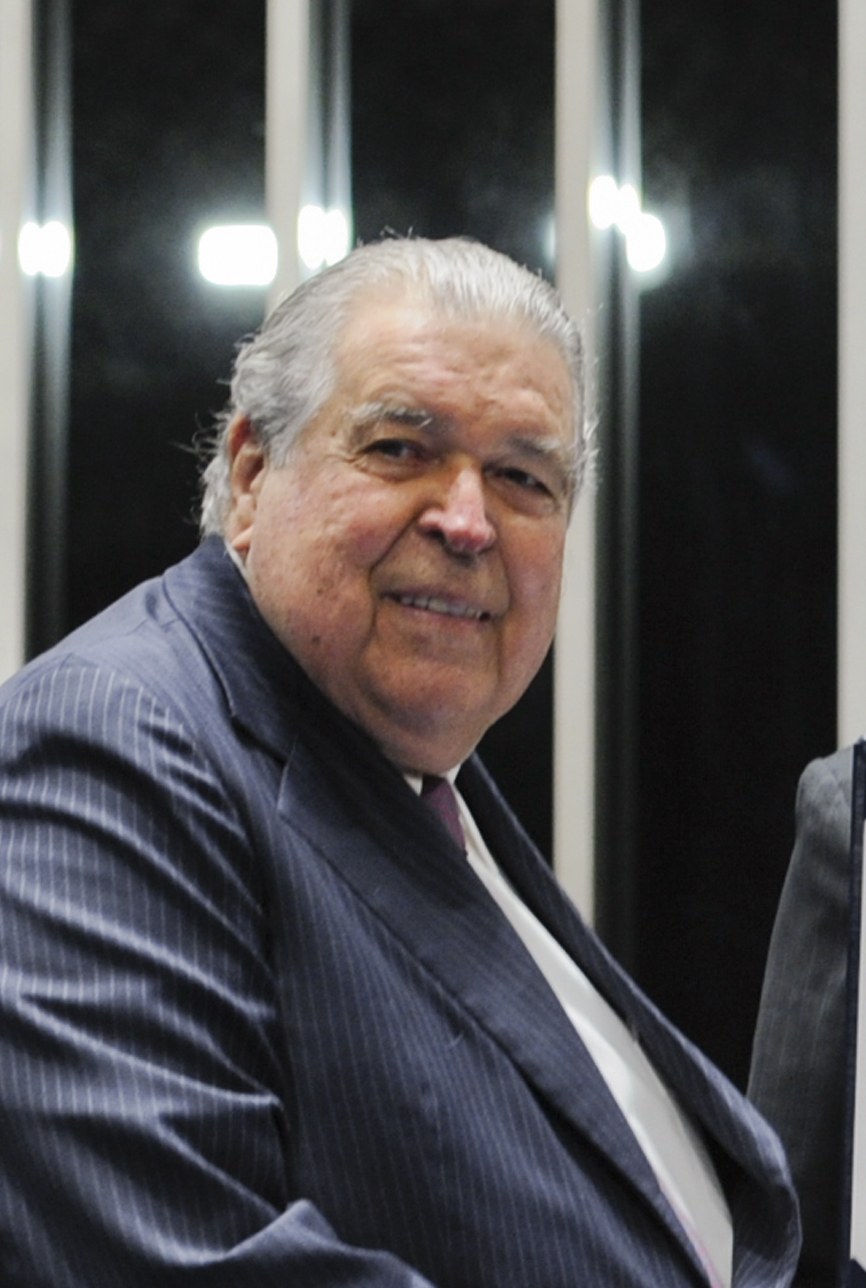
- Born: Ricardo Coimbra de Almeida Brennand; 27 May 1927; Cabo de Santo Agostinho, Brazil
- Died: 25 April 2020 (aged 92); Recife, Brazil
- Education: Federal University of Pernambuco
- Occupations: Businessman, art collector
- Relatives: Francisco Brennand (cousin)

Ricardo Coimbra de Almeida Brennand (27 May 1927 – 25 April 2020) was a Brazilian businessman, engineer, and art collector in the state of Pernambuco. In 2002 he founded the Ricardo Brennand Institute, which includes the world's largest private collection of Frans Post paintings, and was the 17th-highest-rated museum in the world according to TripAdvisor in 2014.

== Early life ==
Brennand was born to Dulce Padilha Coimbra and Antônio Luiz de Almeida Brennand in Cabo de Santo Agostinho. He and his family relocated to Recife in 1930, where Brennand completed his secondary education at Colégio Marista from 1937 to 1942. During this time he learned fluent German and English, owing to his British ancestor Edward Brennand who immigrated to the Brazilian northeast in 1820. He was given a pocketknife by his father in his youth and began collecting weapons and paintings from then. He studied civil and mechanical engineering at the Federal University of Pernambuco, graduating in 1949.

== Business career ==
For many years Brennand was involved in the family business, which operated in the glass production, steel, ceramics, cement, porcelain, and sugar sectors. He managed the Brennand companies alongside his cousin Cornélio Brennand. In 1999 Ricardo and Cornélio sold their cement factories to the Portuguese group Cimpor for US$590 million, with Ricardo using part of the revenue to found the Ricardo Brennand Institute (IRB) in 2001. Due to disagreements over the money earned from the Cimpor deal, Ricardo and Cornélio Brennand split their joint group into their own individual companies.

Following the creation of IRB, Brennand moved his investments to the energy sector, particularly in wind and hydropower. In 2009 he resumed investments in the cement industry, and later ventured into real estate, financing the private residential community Reserva do Paiva in Cabo de Santo Agostinho. In August 2019 it was announced the Brennand group would invest R$450 million in the construction of three wind farms in Bahia, which are expected to be completed in early 2021. At the time the company also planned to enter the solar power industry.

The Ricardo Brennand Institute's collection includes historic and artistic objects from a wide range of periods, from the Late Middle Ages to the 21st century. It contains historic and iconographic documents related to the colonial period and Dutch Brazil, which includes an important collection of paintings made by Dutch artist Frans Post (1612–1680), one of the members of the company of John Maurice, Prince of Nassau-Siegen, who led the New Holland colony in Pernambuco. In 1952, on a trip to England, Brennand purchased many weapons that would later be included in the museum's collection; he acquired many of the items in the museum from auctions and other private collections. In 2003 Queen Beatrix of the Netherlands visited the museum.

In 2019 Brennand's net worth was valued at R$3.1 billion by Forbes, which made him the second-oldest billionaire in Brazil at the time.

== Personal life ==
Brennand was married to Graça Monteiro Brennand, with whom he had eight children. He was the cousin of ceramics artist Francisco Brennand.

Brennand died on 25 April 2020, aged 92, at Real Hospital Português in Recife, due to complications from COVID-19 during the COVID-19 pandemic in Brazil. Remembrances came from Pernambuco governor Paulo Câmara and Recife mayor Geraldo Júlio, the latter declaring three days of mourning in honor of Brennand.
