= Carlos Julião =

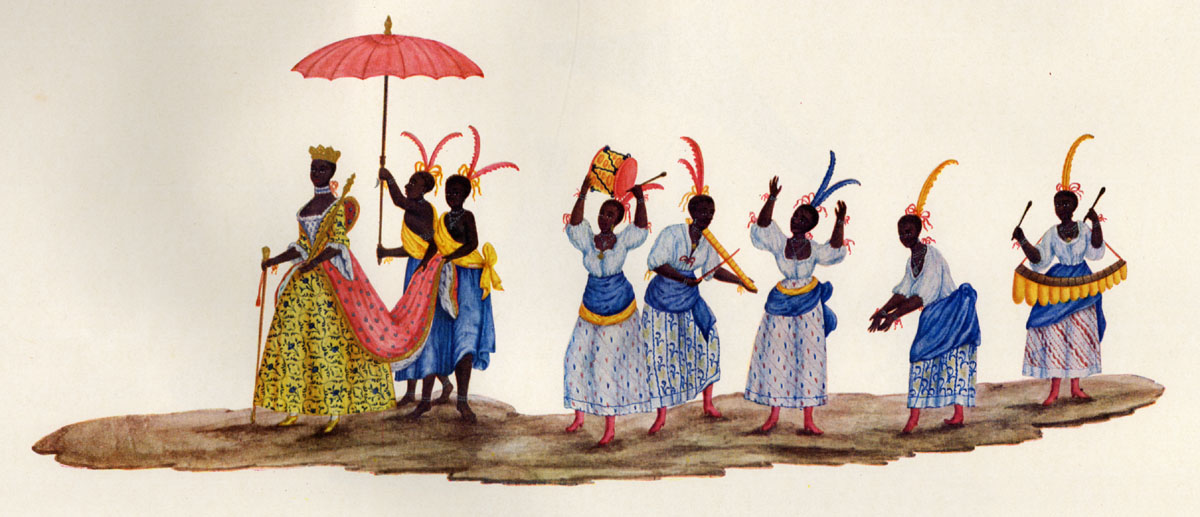
By painting Brazil during the mining period, Carlos Julião created visual references about the costumes and the life of street sellers and slaves.

Carlos Julião (1740, Turin – 1811, Lisbon) was a Luso-Italian artist and engineer of the Portuguese colonial army, working as a fortress inspector during the second half of the 18th century and beginning of the 19th century. He is more known for his watercolor drawings, portraying the different racial and social types inhabiting the Portuguese Empire, as well as the period and methods of mining in Brazil.

== Biography ==
Carlos Julião, or Carlo Juliani, as some of the official documents refer to him, was born in 1740 in Turin, Piedmont, Italy. In 1763, he joined the royal artillery regiment of the Portuguese military as lieutenant. It is unknown what connected the Italian born to the Portuguese Empire, but a 1792 letter signed by Queen Maria, consecrating him with the title of Knight of the Military Royal Order of Saint Benedict of Aviz, mentions the name of his father – João Baptista – indicating a Portuguese paternal side. One of his first missions was at Mazagan in Morocco, the last Portuguese possession in northern Africa, which was taken by the Muslims in 1769, and where Julião, according to official documentation, risked his life under fire.

After 1770, Julião served in a topographic assignment to Macao in China, as part of a reformation plan commanded by the Navy and Overseas minister, Martinho de Melo e Castro. Until 1781, when he became captain with mining expertise, Julião would have travelled the entire Portuguese colonized lands serving a fortress inspector.

In Brazil, Julião participated in the collecting of woods at the captaincy of Pernambuco, under the orders of Governor Tomás José de Melo, who congratulated Julião's work in a 1788 letter to Minister Martinho de Melo e Castro. The governor of the captaincy asked that Julião got a promotion to lieutenant-coronel to lead the captaincy regiment. The request was not accepted since there is no record of Julião performing other assignments in the region. But his contribution to form a collection of wood specimens for the Royal Academy of Science in Lisbon, founded in 1779, became a personal interest of him. In 1795, Julião was promoted to major and nominated to Army Arsenal in Lisbon, and could finally dedicate himself to his “Dictionary of Trees and Bushes”, published in 1800. Promoted for the last time in 1805 to coronel, and to inspector of the army arsenal where he substituted his colleague and friend Carlos Napione, Julião also served under the command of English Marshall Beresford during the second French invasion in 1809. His request for retirement to the crown was granted but came later, after his death on the evening of 18 November 1811: “an honored and loyal servant to his majesty”.

== Art work ==
The painting on the top right, is called "The Queen and Her Suite." This picture above has nothing do with shown costumes. This was a parade that was being held in Brazil in the King and Queen of Brazil in their honours. Carlos Julião attended drawing classes which prepared Portuguese officers assigned around the empire to collect visual information about the peoples and territories colonized by the Portuguese. For six years, Julião served in India and illustrated a manuscript called "Noticia Summária do Gentilismo na Ásia", where with drawings and texts he reproduced Hindu beliefs of Brahman tradition. These images are included in the catalogue "Riscos Iluminados de Figurinhos de Negros e Brancos dos Uzos do Rio de Janeiro e Serro Frio" maintained by the National Library in Rio de Janeiro, which was published in 1960. The title of the catalogue refers to 43 watercolor drawings portraying indigenous, military, costumes, slaves and their activities including diamond mining. Ethnographic representations of colonial Brazil; an ethnographic record of great utility to the authorities that run the empire. In the same catalogue are also included 33 drawings of Peruvian indigenous ceramic objects and textiles, confiscated from a Spanish shipwreck at Peniche in Portugal. On the back of these drawings, there are watercolor sketches representing the culture of Portugal's central plateau where Peniche is located. The three groups of illustrations related to India, Brazil and Peru were published in 1960 by the National Library but they were already property of the institution since 1947, after they were acquired from an anonymous seller, residing in the United States. Its publication in 1960 commemorated the 500th anniversary of Prince Henry, the navigator along with various events and publications which happened that year simultaneously in Portugal and Brazil. Less known but also published that year in the exhibition catalogue "Engenharia Militar no Brasil e no Ultramar Português Antigo e Moderno", are the two works preserved by the department of archaeological studies in military engineering at Lisbon. One is illustrated on the top by a view of the city of Salvador da Bahia taken from the bay, with the building numbered with legends. Other elements were added to the composition, such as the plans of the city fortresses and similar figures to the "Riscos Iluminados" catalogue, representing the city's population of masters and slaves. The other work shows four views of the city ports of Rio, Goa, Daman e Macao, as well as various figures representing those regions of the empire.

In 1999, during a Sotheby's auction in New York, two more works by Carlos Julião became known to the public. The two oil paintings were acquired from an anonymous owner by Recife's Ricardo Brennand Institute. The paintings show various figures representative of the populations of Portugal, Brazil, and Angola, and from such diverse social and racial classes as a metropolitan judge or an African captured slave with her baby in her arms.

== Bibliography ==
Primary sources:

- Academia Militar de Lisboa . 1960. Comemorações do Centenário da Morte do Infante D. Henrique. Lisboa: Academia Militar.
- Arquivo Histórico Militar . Carlos Julião: No. AHM/DIV/3/7/329.
- Arquivo Histórico Ultramarino . Documentos avulsos Capitania de Pernambuco: AHU_ACL_CU_015 Cx. 166, doc. 11832, 19/12/1788.
- Escorel, Silvia . 2000. Vestir Poder e Poder Vestir, o tecido social e a trama cultural nas imagens do traje negro, Rio de Janeiro, século XVIII. Tese de Mestrado, Departamento de Ciências Sociais, Universidade Federal Rio de Janeiro.
- Estado Maior do Exército Português . 1960. Engenharia Militar no Brasil e no Ultramar Português Antigo e Moderno. Lisboa: Esc. Prof Salesianos de São José.
- Juliao, Carlos Dicionário Histórico das Arvores e Arbustos, Biblioteca Nacional de Portugal, COD.10748, 1801.
- Julião, Carlos . Riscos Iluminados de Figurinhos de Negros e Brancos dos Uzos do Rio de Janeiro e Serro Frio. Rio de Janeiro: Biblioteca Nacional, 1960.
- Lara, Silvia Hunold . 2007. Fragmentos Setecentistas: Escravidão, Cultura e Poder na América Portuguesa. São Paulo: Companhia das Letras.
- Lara, Silvia Hunold . 5/7/2006. “Mulheres Escravas, Identidades Africanas”. Universidade Federal da Bahia in https://web.archive.org/web/20160304003211/http://www.desafio.ufba.br/gt3-006.html
- Lara, Silvia Hunold . 2002. “Significados Cruzados: um Reinado de Congos na Bahia Setecentista” in Cunha, Maria Clementina Pereira Carnavais e Outras Festas: Ensaios de Historia Social da Cultura. São Paulo: Editora da Unicamp, p. 71-100.
- Lara, S. H. . 2002. "Customs and costumes: Carlos Julião and the image of black slaves in late Eighteenth-century Brazil". Slavery And Abolition, v. 23, n. 2, p. 125-146.
- Sotheby's . 28/01/1999. Old Master Paintings. New York, p. 302-303.
- Tenreiro, Maria Manuela . Military Encounters in the 18th Century: Racial Representations in the work of Carlos Julião

and colonial discourse in the Portuguese Empire. Dissertação de Doutorado, School of Oriental and African Studies, Universidade de Londres, 2008.

- Tenreiro, Maria Manuela . "Military Encounters in the Eighteenth-Century: Carlos Julião and Racial Representations in the Portuguese Empire" . "Portuguese Studies", v. 23, pp. 7–35, 2007.
- Torre do Tombo . Chancelaria da Ordem de Avis, D. Maria I (Livro 391).
