= Ricardo Brennand Institute =

Art museum in Recife, Brazil

Coordinates: 8°4′7.49″S 34°52′43.84″W

Instituto Ricardo Brennand
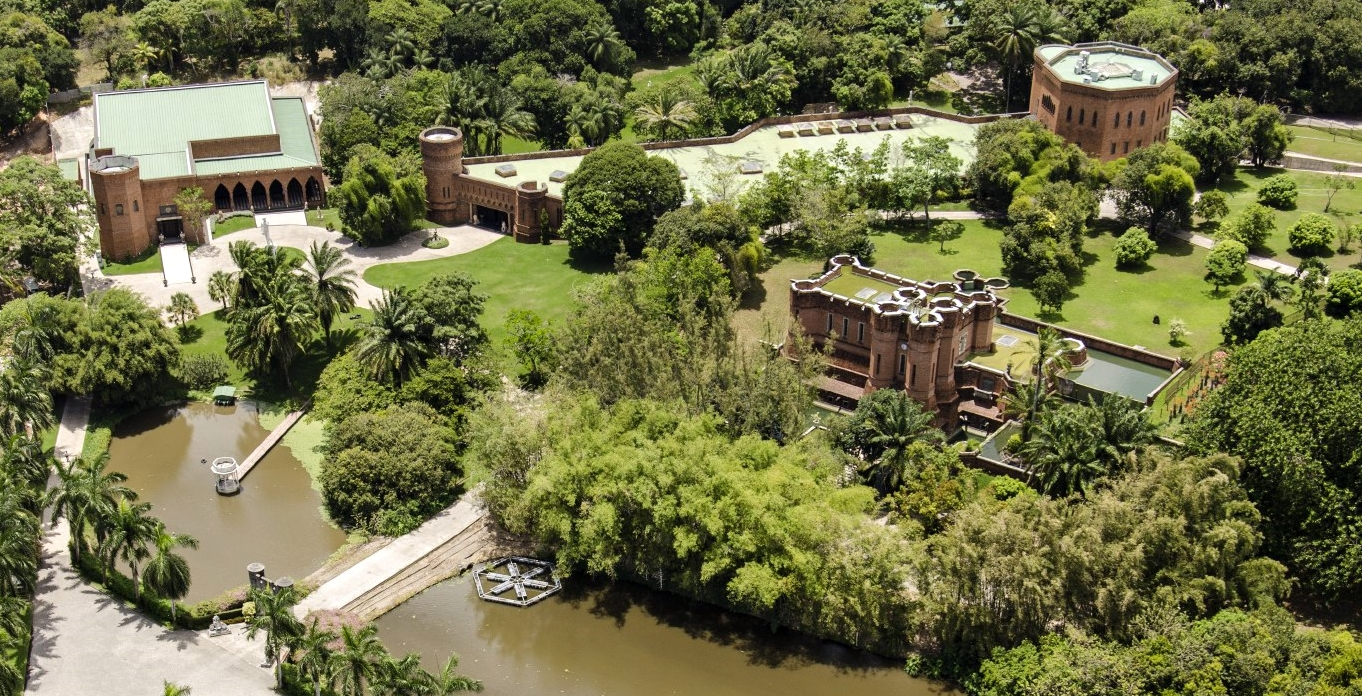
- Established: 2002
- Location: Recife, Brazil
- Director: Ricardo Brennand
- Website: institutoricardobrennand.org.br

The Ricardo Brennand Institute (Portuguese: Instituto Ricardo Brennand, IRB) is a cultural institution located in the city of Recife, Brazil. It is a not-for-profit private organization, inaugurated in 2002 by the Brazilian collector and businessman Ricardo Brennand. It comprises a museum, an art gallery, a library and a large park.

The institute holds a permanent collection of historic and artistic objects of diversified provenience, ranging from Early Middle Ages to 20th century, with strong emphasis in objects, documents and artwork related to Colonial and Dutch Brazil, including the world's largest assemblage of paintings by Frans Post.

The institute also houses one of the largest collections of armory in the world, with 3,000 pieces, the majority of which were produced in Europe and Asia between the 14th and 19th centuries. The library has over 62 thousand volumes, ranging from 16th to 20th century, including a collection of brasiliana and other rare items.

== History ==
The institute was created by Ricardo Brennand (Cabo de Santo Agostinho, 27 May 1927 — Recife, 25 April 2020), a Brazilian collector and businessman of English ancestry, born in Cabo de Santo Agostinho in 1927. Brennand established several factories in the Northeast Region of the country, acting in the segments of cement, tiles, glass, porcelain and sugar production. He started collecting armory, specially melee weapons, in the 1940s. In the following decades, his collection would grow in size and importance, becoming one of the largest such ensembles in the world.

In 1990, Brennand decided to sell some of his factories, gathering the financial resources needed to establish a museum with the aim of preserving and exhibiting his holdings. Prior to the institute opening, he also became interested in acquiring works of art, beside objects related to Brazilian history. He chose to focus his new acquisitions on the 17th century period of the Dutch occupation of Brazilian Northeast. In five years, Brennand acquired a large group of canvases by Frans Post, as well as 17th-century Dutch landscape and portrait paintings, maps, tapestries, objects, coins, documents and rare books, all of which acquainted to the Dutch rule in Brazil.

The Ricardo Brennand Institute was inaugurated in September 2002, with an exhibition devoted to Albert Eckhout, displaying for the first time outside Europe all of his paintings done in Brazil, which belong to the National Museum of Denmark. In 2003, the institute opened the permanent exhibition Frans Post and Dutch Brazil in the collection of Instituto Ricardo Brennand, inaugurated by Queen Beatrix of the Netherlands, on the occasion of her visit to Brazil.

Beside permanent and temporary exhibitions, the institute offers courses on history of art, educational program devoted to students of public and private schools of Pernambuco, art education programs for teachers and cultural activities in general.

== Building and park ==
The institute is headquartered in a castle-like set of structures, named "Castelo de São João", designed after the Tudor style, with a total gross area of 77,000 square meters. It's a contemporary construction, blended with some original elements, such as a drawbridge, reliefs of coats of arms and a Gothic altarpiece brought from Europe. The complex consists of the Museum of Armory, an art gallery, a library, an auditorium and areas for public services and technical/administrative rooms.

The complex is surrounded by a 18,000 hectares (44,000 acres) garden, endowed with artificial lakes and a number of large-size sculptures, such as The Thinker, by Auguste Rodin, The lady and the horse by Fernando Botero, and other works by Sonia Ebling, Leopoldo Martins, etc.

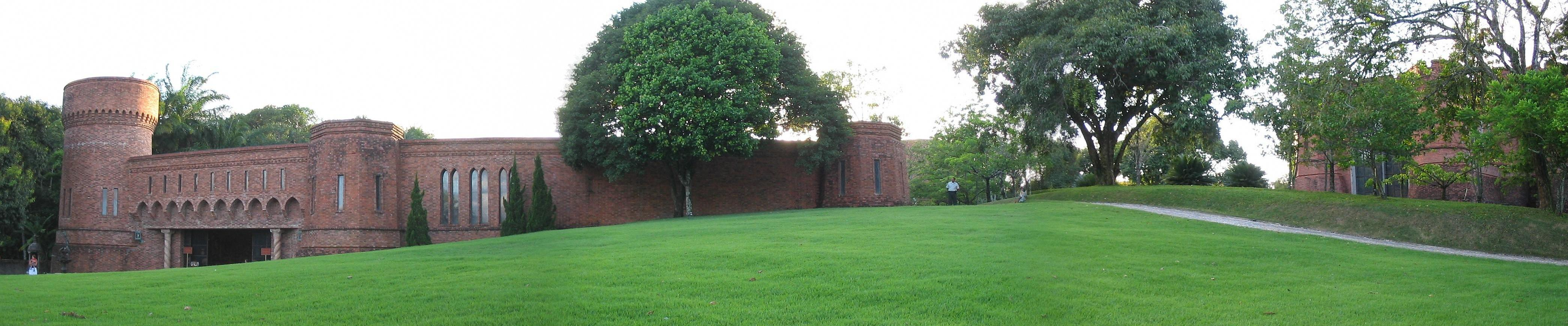
Panoramic view

== Collections ==
The Ricardo Brennand Institute holdings comprise collections of painting, sculpture, armory, tapestry, decorative arts and furniture, with objects ranging from Early Middle Ages to the 20th century, proceeding from Europe, Asia, the Americas and Africa.

=== Armory ===
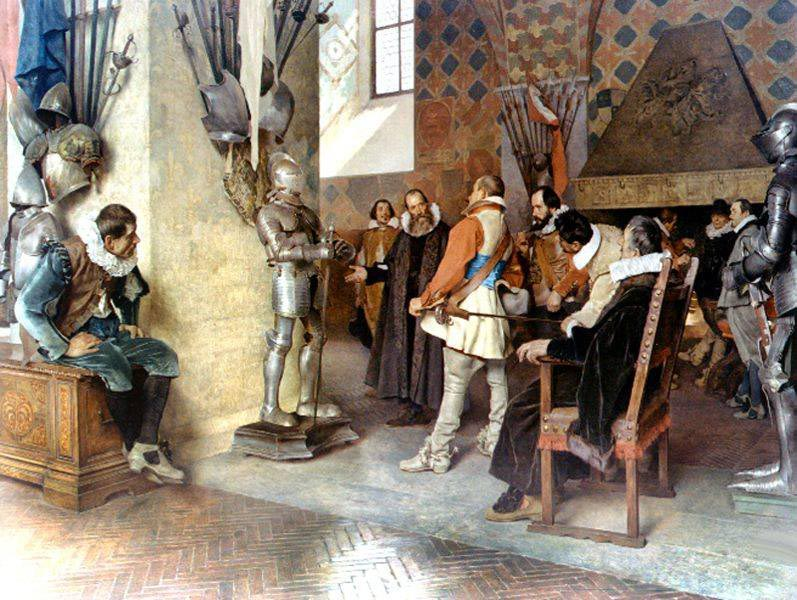
Tito Lessi – Armory trade, 19th century. Ricardo Brennand Institute collection

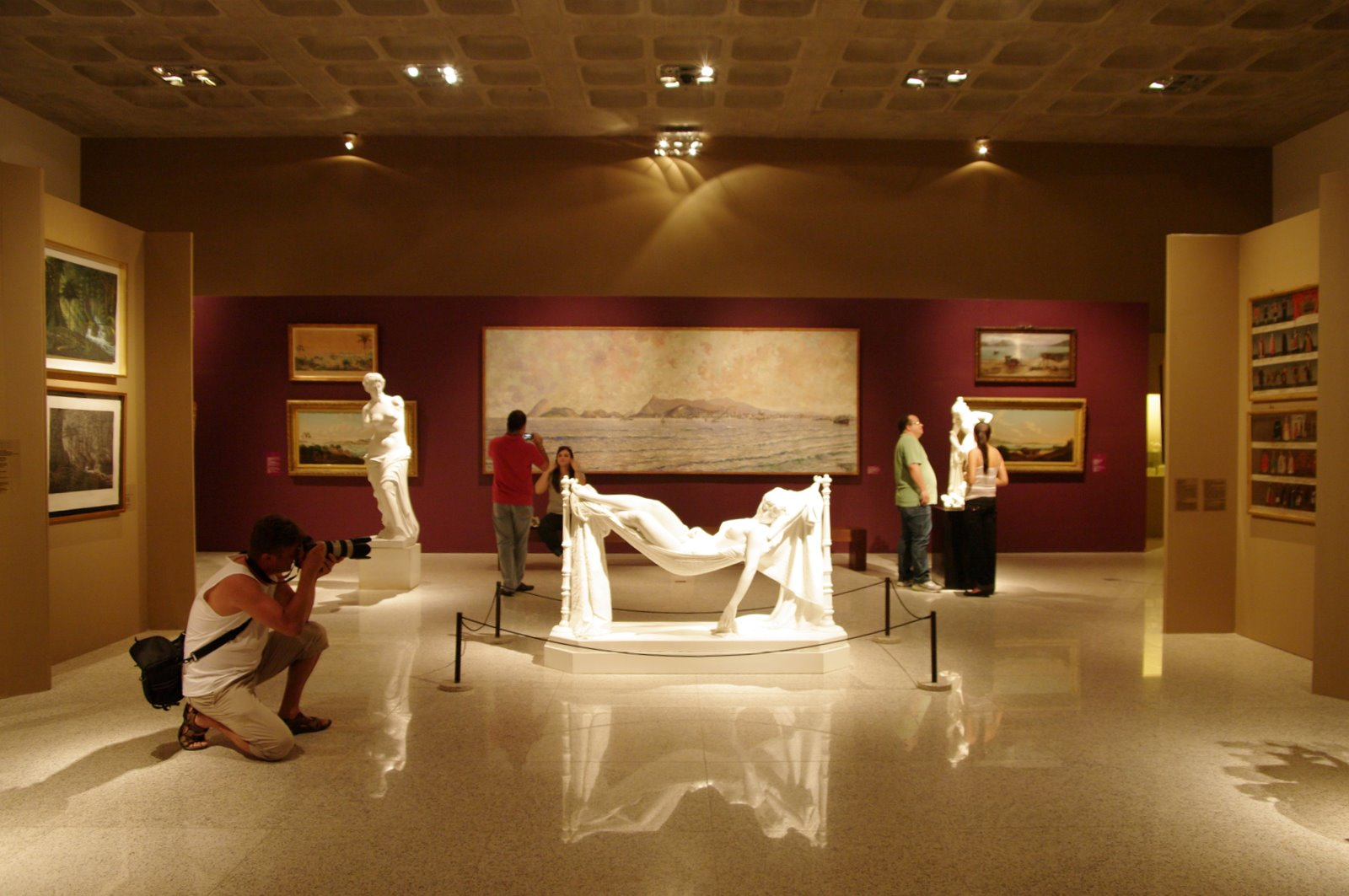
Ricardo Brennand Institute

The collection of armory, specialized in melee weapons, is among the largest of its kind in the world. It comprises nearly 3,000 objects, the majority of which produced in England, France, Italy, Germany, Spain, Sweden, Turkey, India and Japan. The collection includes weapons used for hunting, battling (offensive and defensive), exhibition and decoration. One of the highlights is the set of 27 full plate armors (i.e., including shields, helmets, gauntlets and chain mails) produced between the 14th and the 17th centuries, as well as armor for dogs and horses.

The assemblage of Medieval and melee weapons includes daggers, stilettos, swords, maces, flails, halberds, crossbows, knives, pocket knives and other objects produced between the 15th and the 21st century. Among them, a large number of pieces richly decorated with semi-precious stones, ivory, horns, nacre, oak, steel and other materials stand out. The collection also includes exhibition knives and pocketknives produced by Joseph Rodgers & Sons Ltd., a traditional British cutlery, established in Sheffield in 1724.

=== Decorative arts, furniture and tapestries ===
The collection of decorative arts includes objects from Europe, Asia and Africa, dating back to the 17th century, such as candlesticks, candelabra, jugs, mosaics, stained glass windows, miniature caskets, Chinese ceramics, musical instruments, etc. Among the highlights, there is a pair of French blackamoor torcheres, modeled by Émile Guillemin and cast by Barbedienne in the 19th century, as well as a number of small-scale statuary by the traditional Parisian firm E. Granger. There is also an assemblage of longcase clocks of Austrian and French origin, including a Planchon clock with porcelain dial and equinox-inspired decoration. Among the most valuable works in this collection is also an Italian Baroque organ produced by Domenico Mangino (ca. 1625).

The collection of furniture is mostly composed of English and French examples, including storage and resting pieces, such as chests, sideboards, cupboards, bookcases, and chairs, made with oak, walnut and other types of wood. Outstanding among them are the pieces of Gothic trend, a 19th-century Bonheur du jour writing desk in Biedermeier style, and an 18th-century sacristy chest of drawers, proceeding from Minas Gerais. The collection of tapestries includes French and Flemish examples, most of which from the 18th century, produced by Aubusson tapestry, Gobelins Manufactory, etc.

=== Dutch Brazil ===
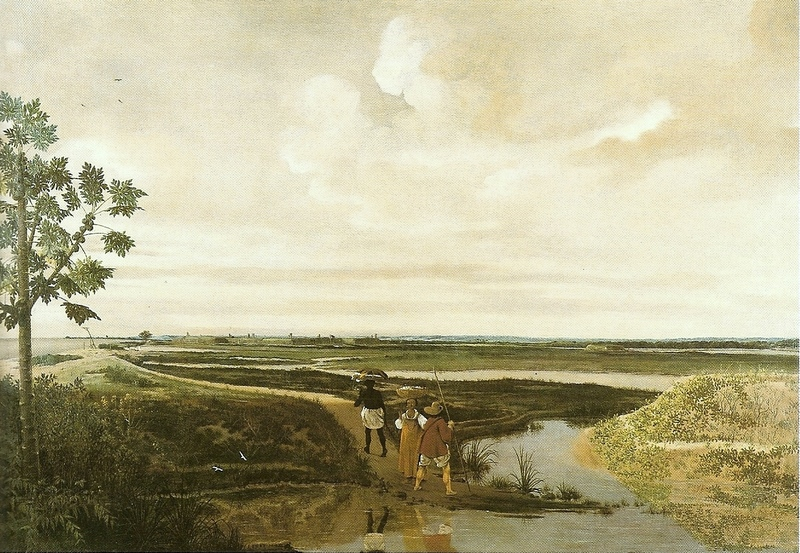
Frans Post – Fort Frederick Hendrik, 1640

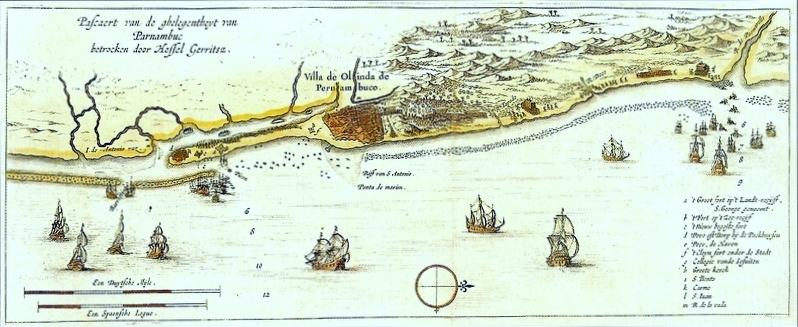
Hessel Gerritsz – Map of Pernambuco, 1631

The Ricardo Brennand Institute houses one of the most comprehensive collections of historical and iconographic documentation related to the 17th century period of Dutch occupation of Brazilian Northeast. Outstanding among these objects is the world's largest ensemble of paintings by Frans Post, the first landscapist of the New World. The institute holds 15 of Post's paintings, which is equivalent to 10% of the artist's known output. It is the only collection that covers every phase of Post's oeuvre. Of particular importance is the canvas View of Fort Frederick Hendrik, painted by Post in Recife in 1640, which is the only of the seven remaining paintings produced by Post while he was still in Brazil that is currently housed in a Brazilian collection (the other six are distributed among the Louvre, the Mauritshuis and the Cisneros collection). Among the set of 17th-century Dutch paintings, there are also oil portraits of John Maurice of Nassau by the workshops of Pieter Nason and Jan de Baen.

The institute preserves a group of prints made between 1644 and 1645 by a group of engravers led by Jan van Brosterhuisen, after detailed drawings made by Frans Post to illustrate Caspar Barlaeus's Rerum per octennium in Brasilia et alibi nuper gestarum sub praefectura. Post's original drawings are currently housed in the British Museum. The prints depict the main sites and the topography of Brazilian lands under Dutch rule. Also of cartographic importance is the ensemble of 17th-century Brazilian maps made by Hessel Gerritsz, Claes Visscher, Georg Marcgrave, Izaac Commelyn and others.

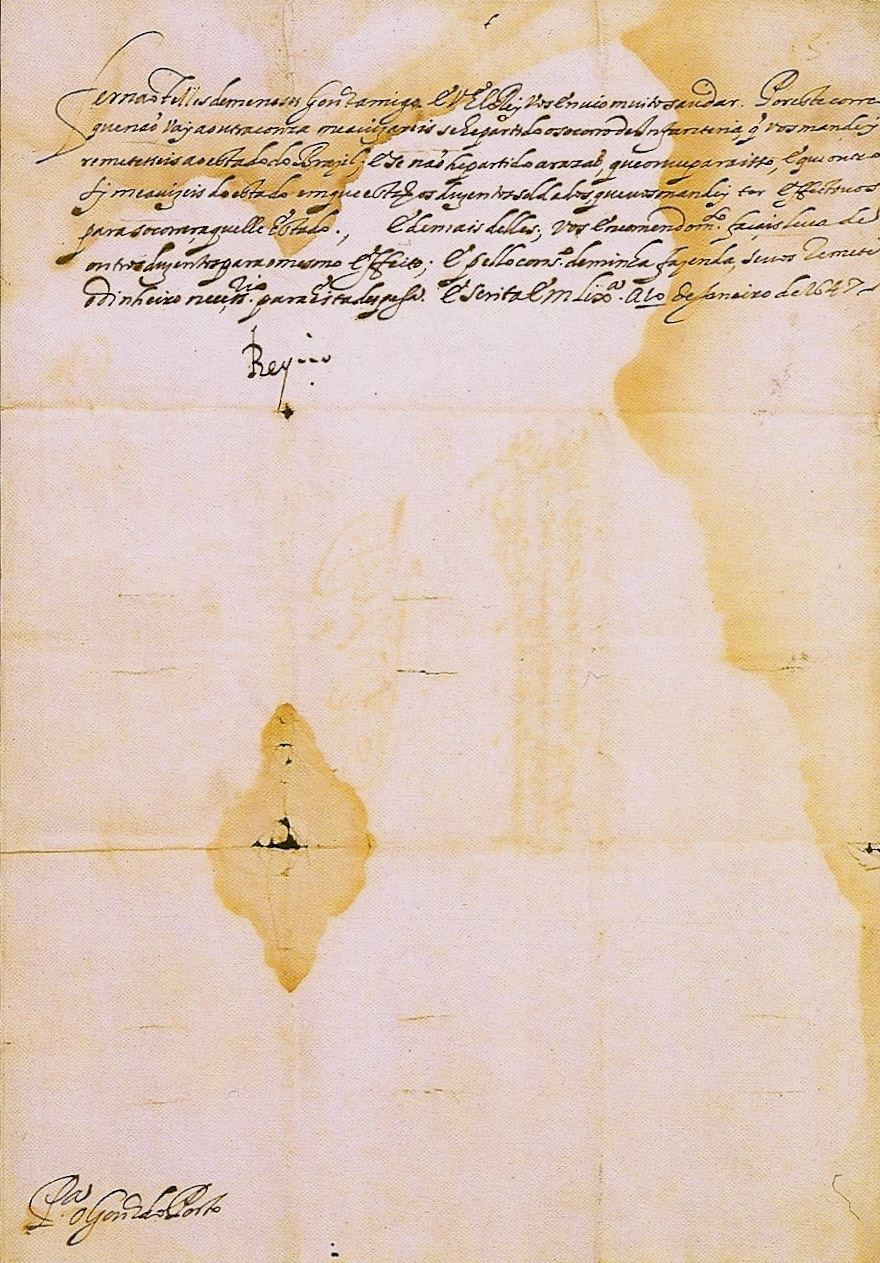
Letter written by John IV of Portugal. Lisbon, January 20, 1647

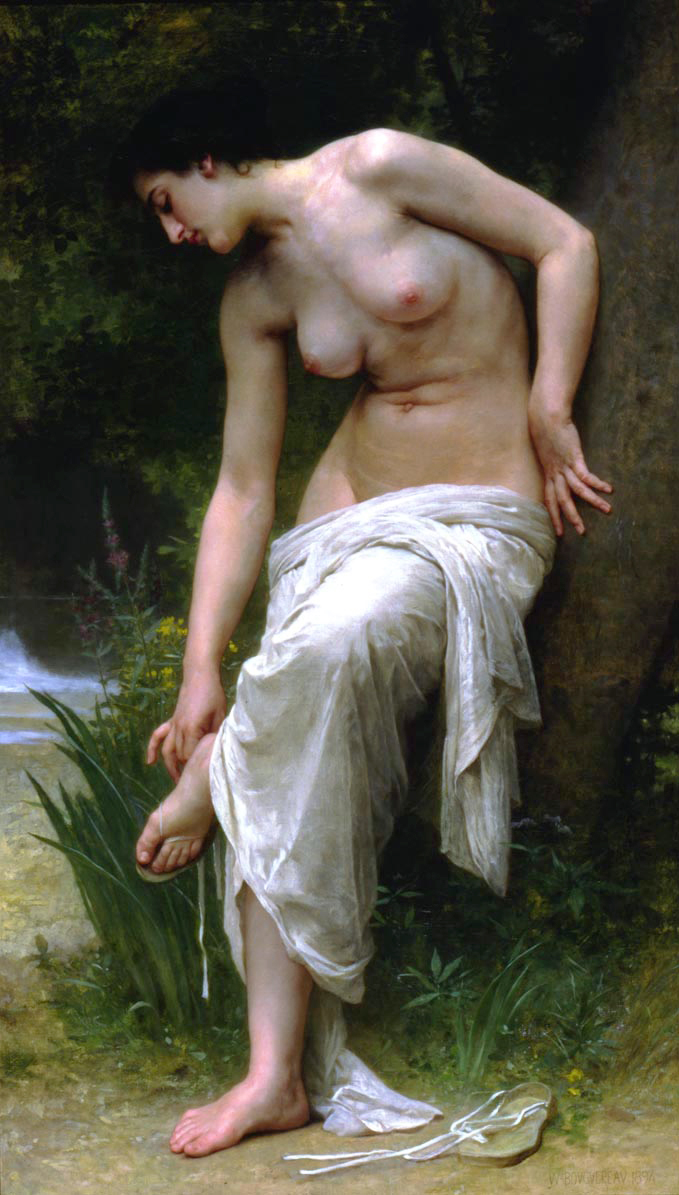
William-Adolphe Bouguereau – After the Bath, 1894

Of great historical importance is the rare collection of Dutch emergency coins (known as obsidionais), produced between 1645 and 1654 to overcome the lack of local currency caused by the Portuguese besieging. The collection of manuscripts is composed by reports, directions, memoranda and other documents related to the historical events and figures of the time. It includes correspondences of Isabella of Spain, Maurice of Nassau, Johan de Witt, etc. The centerpiece is a letter sent by John IV of Portugal, about the reinforcement of 200 men to assist in the expulsion of the Dutch, a key-document for the preparation of the Battle of Guararapes.

The assemblage of artifacts includes objects produced in the Netherlands with Brazilian raw materials (such as the coconut cups), commemorative silverware, a rare example of the largest kind of terrestrial globes made by Mateus Greuter (of which only 15 examples are known to exist), pipes of the West India Company, etc. Other objects show the influence that the iconographic and scientific material collected by Nassau in Brazil and distributed among European monarchs had in the production of artworks and in the imagination of his contemporaries, such as the famous tapestries of Anciennes and Nouvelles Indes, based on Albert Eckhout's drawings and woven by the Gobelins Manufactory, of which the institute owns four examples, as well as imaginary Brazilian landscapes executed by artists who never went to Brazil, such as Jillis van Schendel.

=== Visual arts ===
The visual arts collection comprises paintings, sculptures, prints and drawings dating back to the 15th century, executed by Brazilian and foreign authors, aside from those mentioned in the preceding topics. The Brazilian art is mostly represented by landscapes, as well as for a significant set of brasiliana (artistic–historic registers about Brazil produced by foreign artists), with predominance of iconography related to Pernambuco and Rio de Janeiro. It includes artworks by Emil Bauch, Louis Schlappriz, Franz Heinnrich Carls, Franz Hagedorn, Claude François Fortier, Johann Moritz Rugendas, Jean-Baptiste Debret, Nicolas-Antoine Taunay, Henri Nicolas Vinet, Nicola Antonio Facchinetti, Giovanni Battista Castagneto, Eliseu Visconti, Jerônimo José Telles Júnior, Benedito Calixto, Carlos Julião, etc.

The collection of European painting is characterized by a strong emphasis in genre works, specially palatial and armory-related scenes, ranging from 17th to 19th century, by artists as Enrique López Martínez, Tito Lessi and Blaise Alexandre Desgoffe. Outstanding among these is a pair of Baroque still-life paintings of armors by Francesco Noletti. Another trend in the collection of European paintings refers to the 19th century Orientalist artworks and nudes, by artists as Edouard Richter, Emmanuel de Dieudonne and Delphin Enjolras. The centerpiece is After the bath by William-Adolphe Bouguereau (1894).

A 15th-century Venetian wood carving representing a black slave is the main highlight in the collection of sculptures, which also includes works by Giovanni Maria Benzoni, Henri Louis Levasseur, Abelardo da Hora and others, as well as a number of replicas of classic pieces proceeding from Romano Romanelli's workshop.

=== Library ===
The Ricardo Brennand Institute's Library focuses on history of Dutch Brazil and was projected to shelter more than 100,000 volumes. It currently houses over 62,000 items, such as books, pamphlets, magazines, newspapers, sheet music, phonograph records, photographs, iconographic albums and rare works. The library collection was formed through acquisitions of private ensembles belonging to Brazilian academics and researchers, such as José Antônio Gonçalves de Mello Neto, Edson Nery da Fonseca and Jaime Cavalcanti Diniz. The collection of rare books comprises items ranging from 16th to 20th century, with special emphasis in works about Brazil written by European travelers. Among the highlights, a 1586 edition of Jean de Léry's History of a Voyage to the Land of Brazil, a 1593 edition of Theodor de Bry's Dritte Buch Americae, a rare 1648 hand-coloured edition of Willem Piso and Georg Marcgrave's Historiae Naturalis Brasilae, a 1647 coloured edition of Caspar Barlaeus's Rerum per Octennium in Brasilia, etc.

== Gallery ==
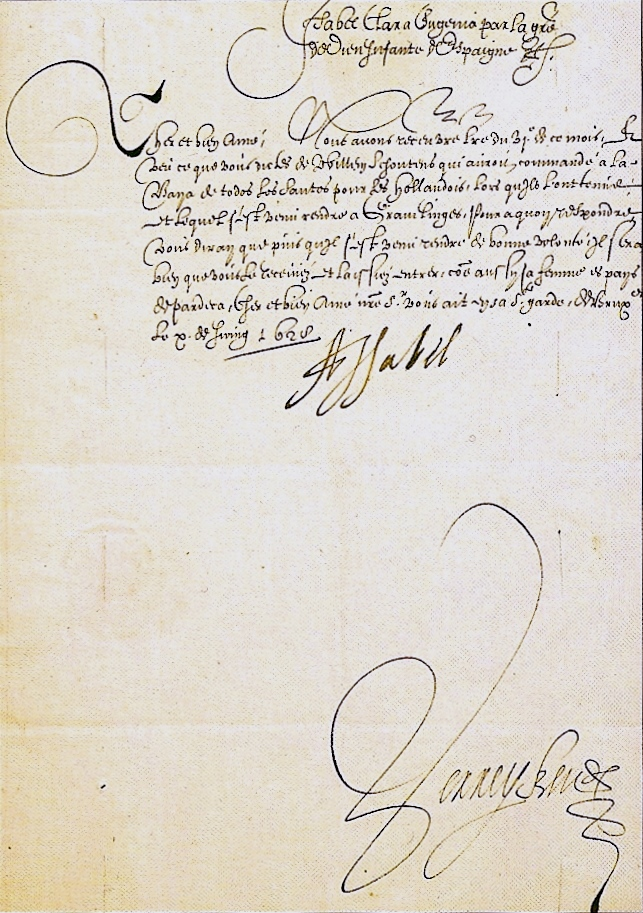
Clara Isabella Eugenia – Manuscript letter, Brussels, June 20, 1628

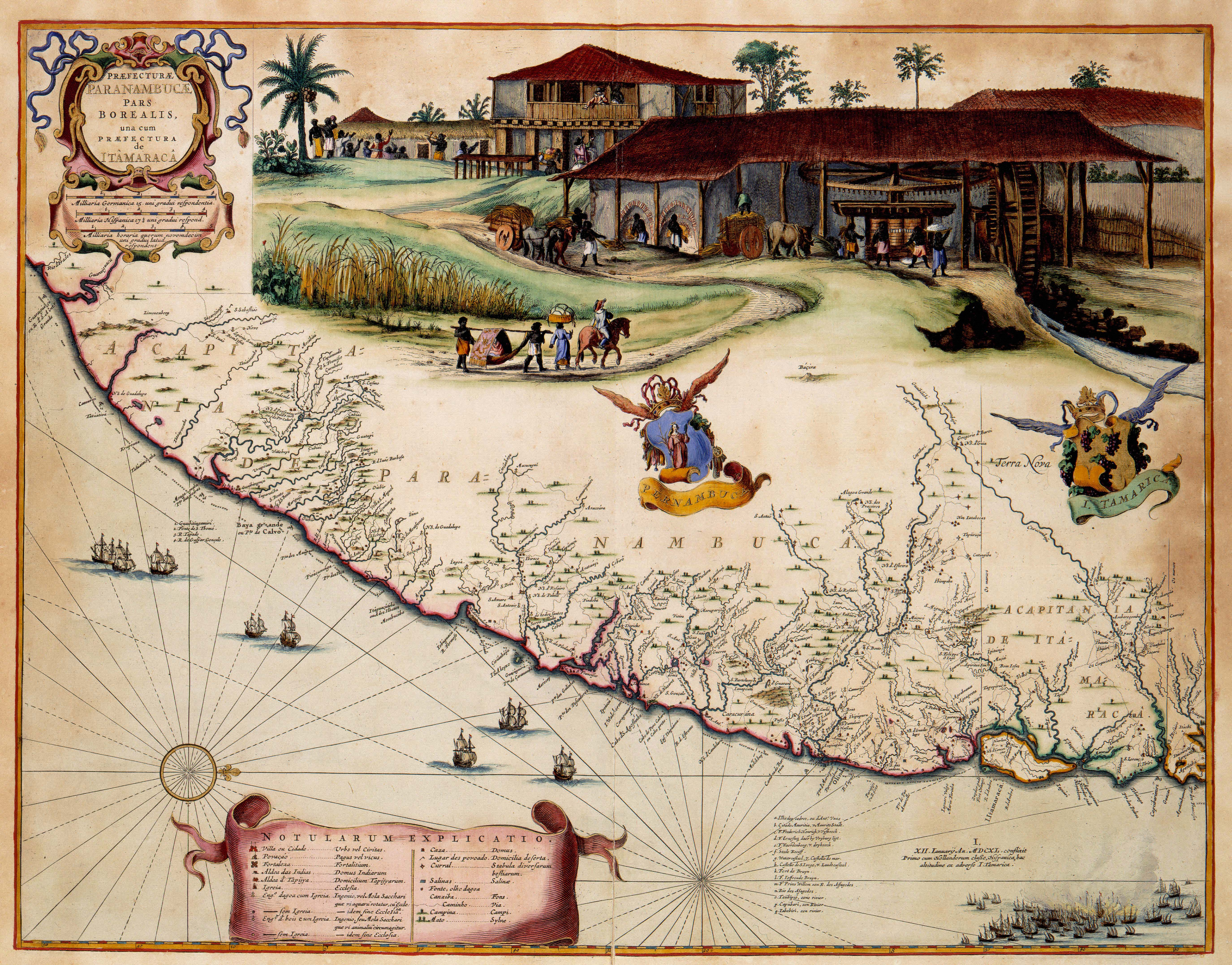
Georg Marcgrave – Map of Pernambuco including Itamaracá, 1643

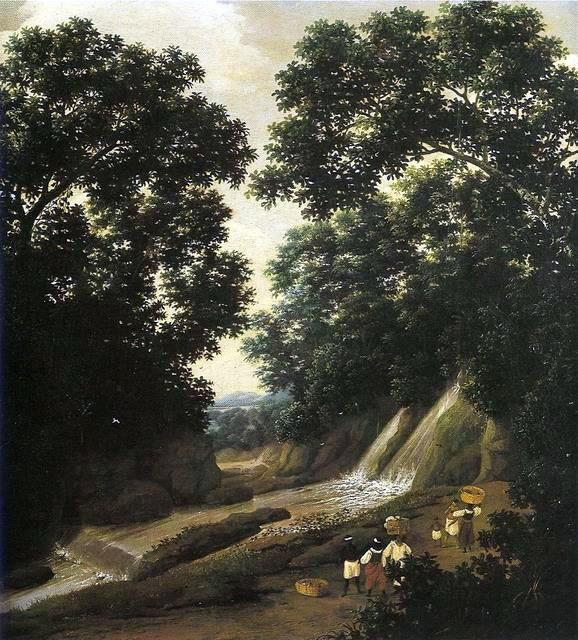
Frans Post – Waterfall in the forest, 1657

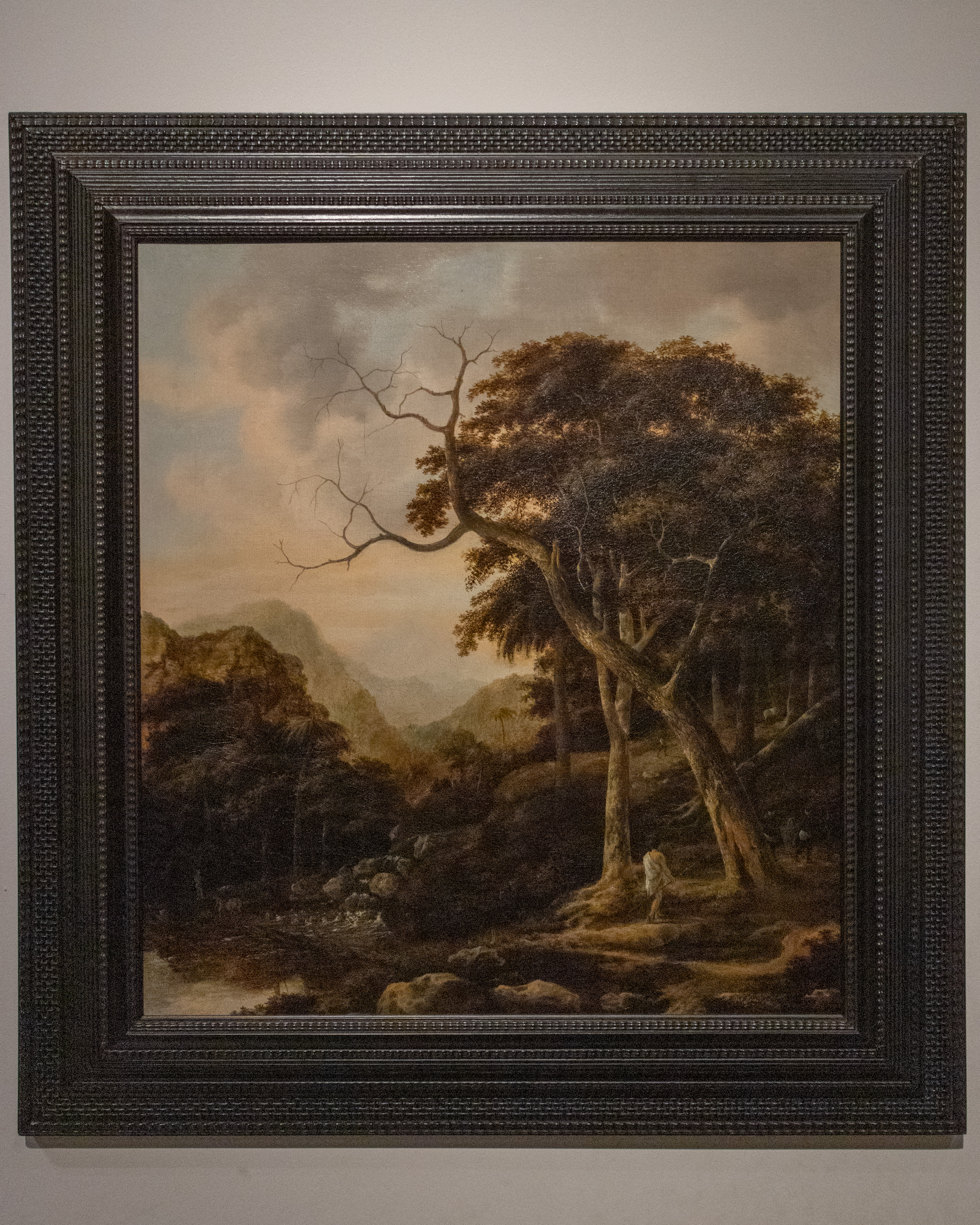
Gillis van Schendel – Brazilian landscape, c. 1665

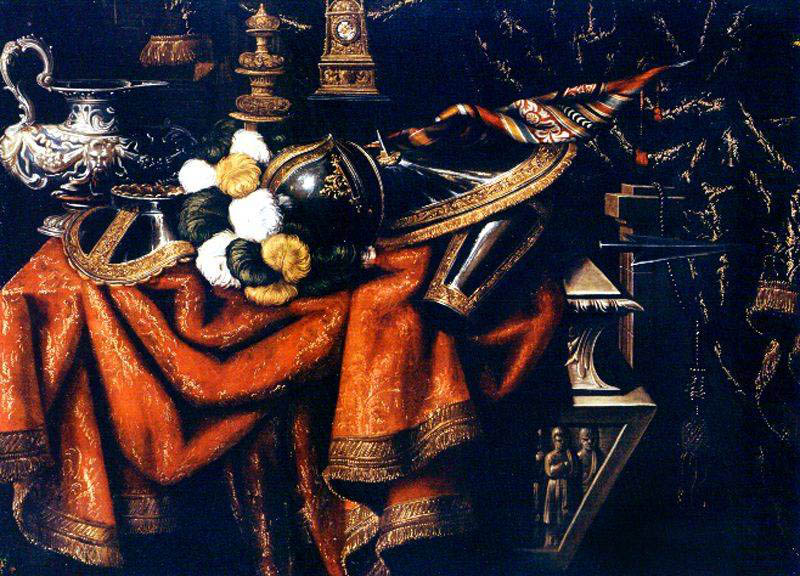
Francesco Noletti – Armor collection, 17th century

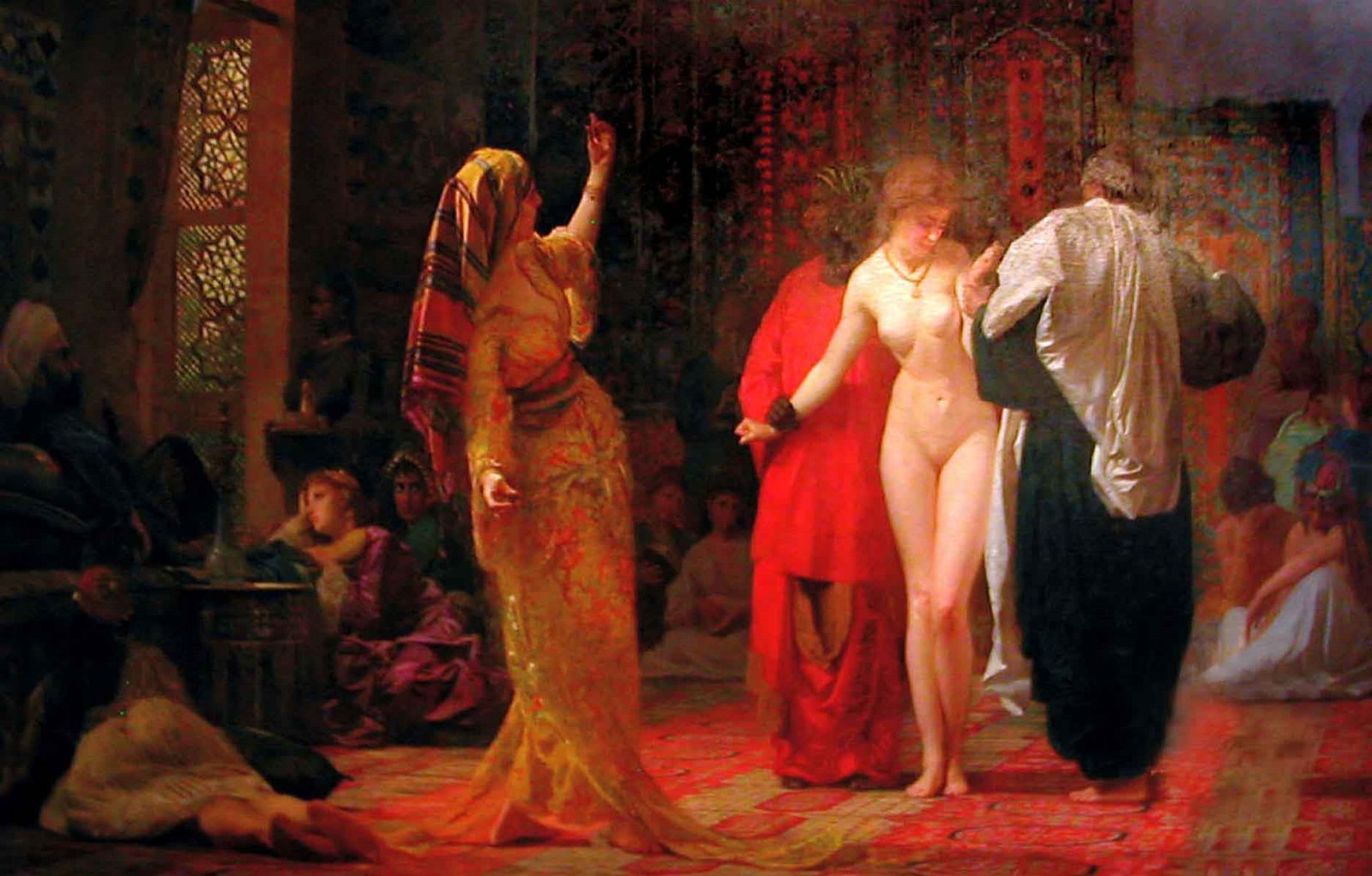
Domenico Rosso – White slaves market, 1884

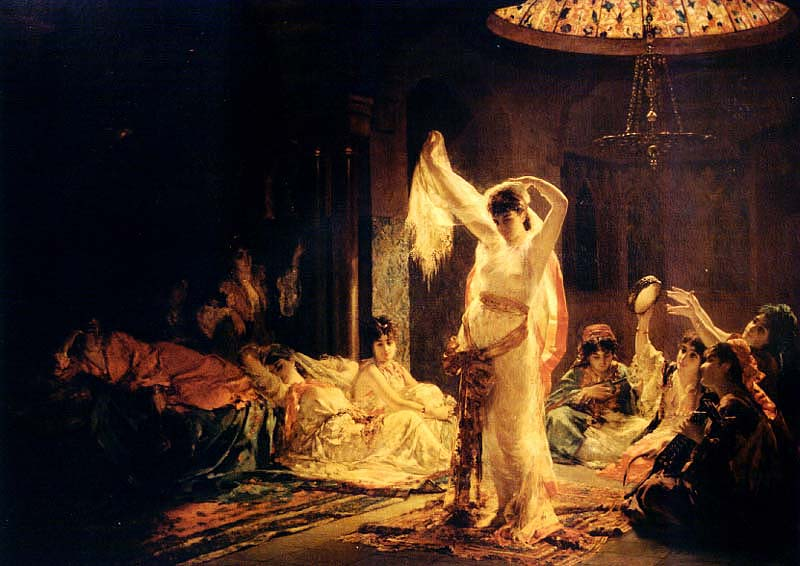
Edouard Richter – The Sultan's amusement, 19th century

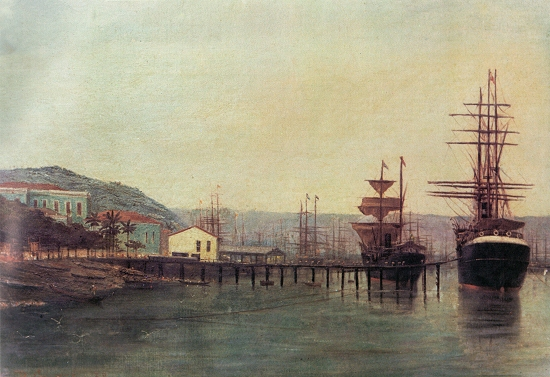
Benedito Calixto – Port of Santos, 1889

== See also ==
- Museu do Estado de Pernambuco
- Kahal Zur Israel Synagogue
- National Historical Museum (Brazil)
