= View of Olinda (Post) =

17th-century painting by Frans Post

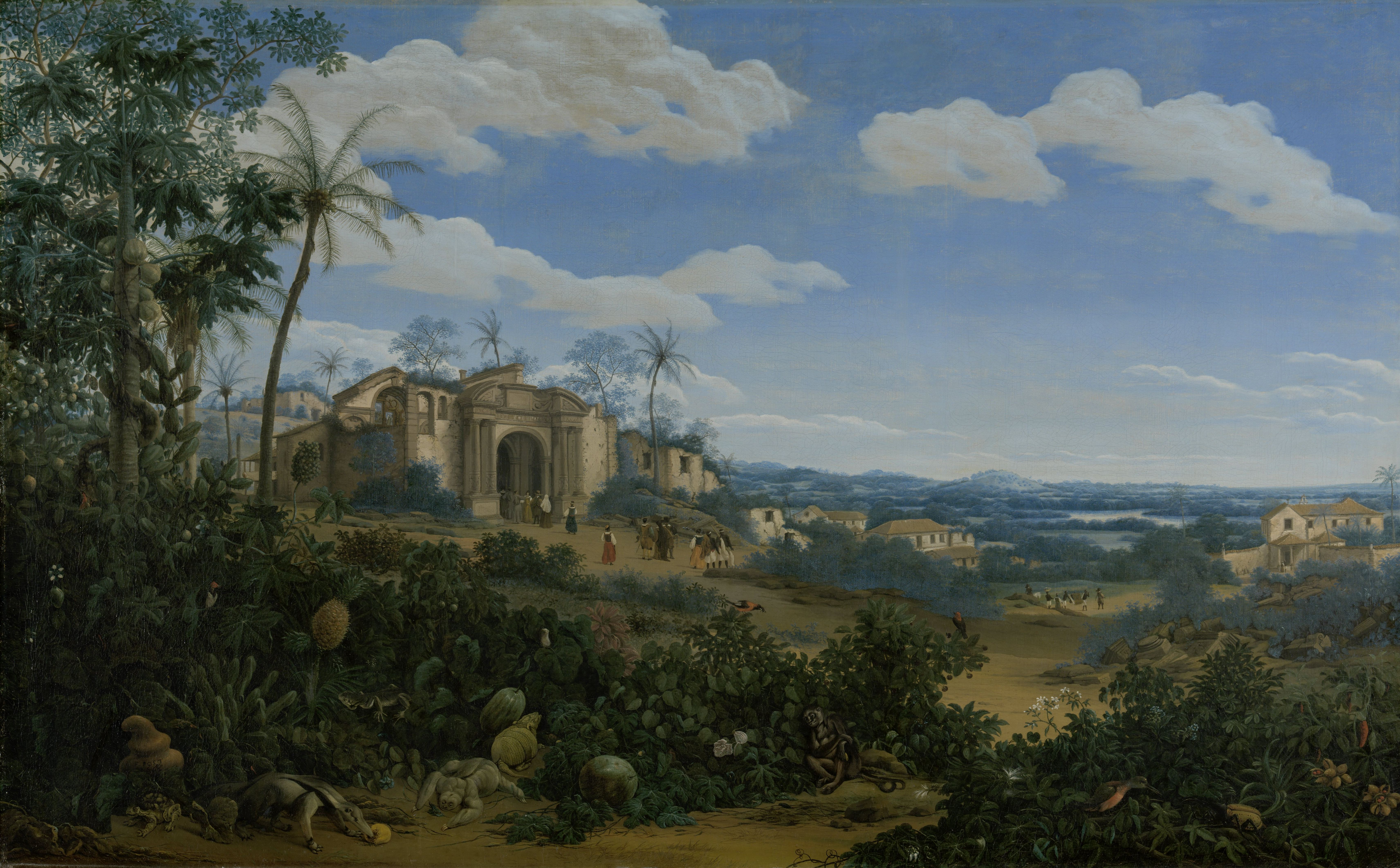
- Artist: Frans Post
- Year: 1662
- Medium: Oil on canvas
- Dimensions: 107.5 cm × 172.5 cm (42.3 in × 67.9 in)
- Location: Rijksmuseum; Amsterdam

View of Olinda is a painting by Frans Post, a Dutch painter who was one of the first European-trained painters to depict landscapes of the Americas during a trip with John Maurice of the WIC. The painting depicts Olinda Cathedral in ruins, damage that was sustained when the Dutch seized a portion of Brazil from the Portuguese. The painting is notable for its depiction of Brazilian animals and plant life, based on drawings Post made from life in Brazil. The painting has its original frame, which is also decorated with motifs from nature.

== Background ==
Post was part of Johan Maurits' (a.k.a. John Maurice)’s entourage when he visited Brazil from 1637-1644. Johan Maurits was Prince of Nassau-Siegen, a state within the Holy Roman Empire at the time, and governor of the Dutch West India Company (WIC). Post was just 23 years old and relatively unknown at the time he embarked for Brazil in October 1636, and the journey across the Atlantic took about two months. Not much is known about his formal training or how he was chosen for the expedition. The goal of the journey was to grow Dutch territory and ease conflict in the region. At the time there were about 2,000 European colonists in Brazil, and the majority of them were affiliated with WIC. Post was brought along as part of Maurits' entourage which consisted of other artists, scientists, and naturalists, their job being to document Brazil's natural life and landscape. The trip yielded hundreds of drawings.

Upon Post's return to the Netherlands, he enjoyed success as a painter.

== Creation ==
View of Olinda is dated 1662, eighteen years after Post left Brazil and returned to Haarlem, the city of his birth. It is one of about 155 oil paintings Post did over the span of decades, based on what he saw in Brazil. It features depictions of plants native to Brazil growing next to plants native to Europe (the Dutch colonizers’ homeland) and plants from Africa (another continent the Dutch were colonizing).

Ironically, Post's paintings were meant to depict Dutch pride and colonization, but the images feature mostly Portuguese-built structures amidst tropical landscapes. Post was still making paintings of his studies from Brazil after the Dutch's (albeit brief) occupation had ended. It is for his paintings of Brazil and the Dutch occupation there that Post is most known.

== Description ==
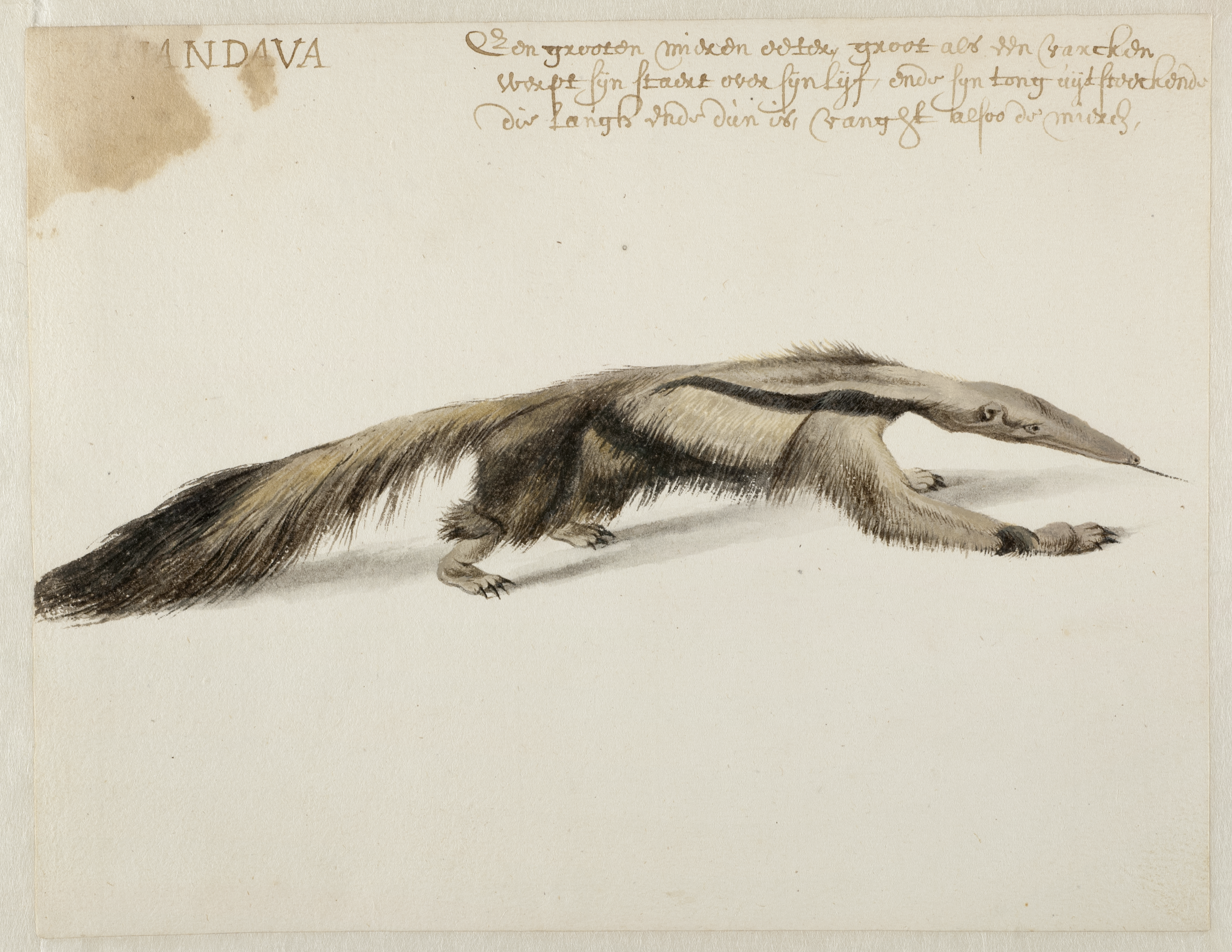
Study of an anteater by Frans Post, ca. 1637-1644

View of Olinda is widely regarded as one of Post's most successful works, created during a prolific time in his career. It is also one of his largest canvases, at approximately 3.5 by 5.5 feet. In the foreground, thick tropical vegetation is teeming with animal life: an iguana, an armadillo, a sloth (Choloepus didactylus), an anteater (Myrmecophaga tridactyla), a monkey who appears to be dozing off while holding a banana, and several birds and insects can be seen. There are many leaves of dark green, a pineapple, cacti, scattered flowers, and on the left, a tall papaya tree frames the composition. Atop a shrub, a bird clutches an insect in its beak as it crouches, presumably about to take flight. Post's signature is subtly inscribed on what appears to be a very large gourd which sits in the bottom left foreground, reading: "F. Post."

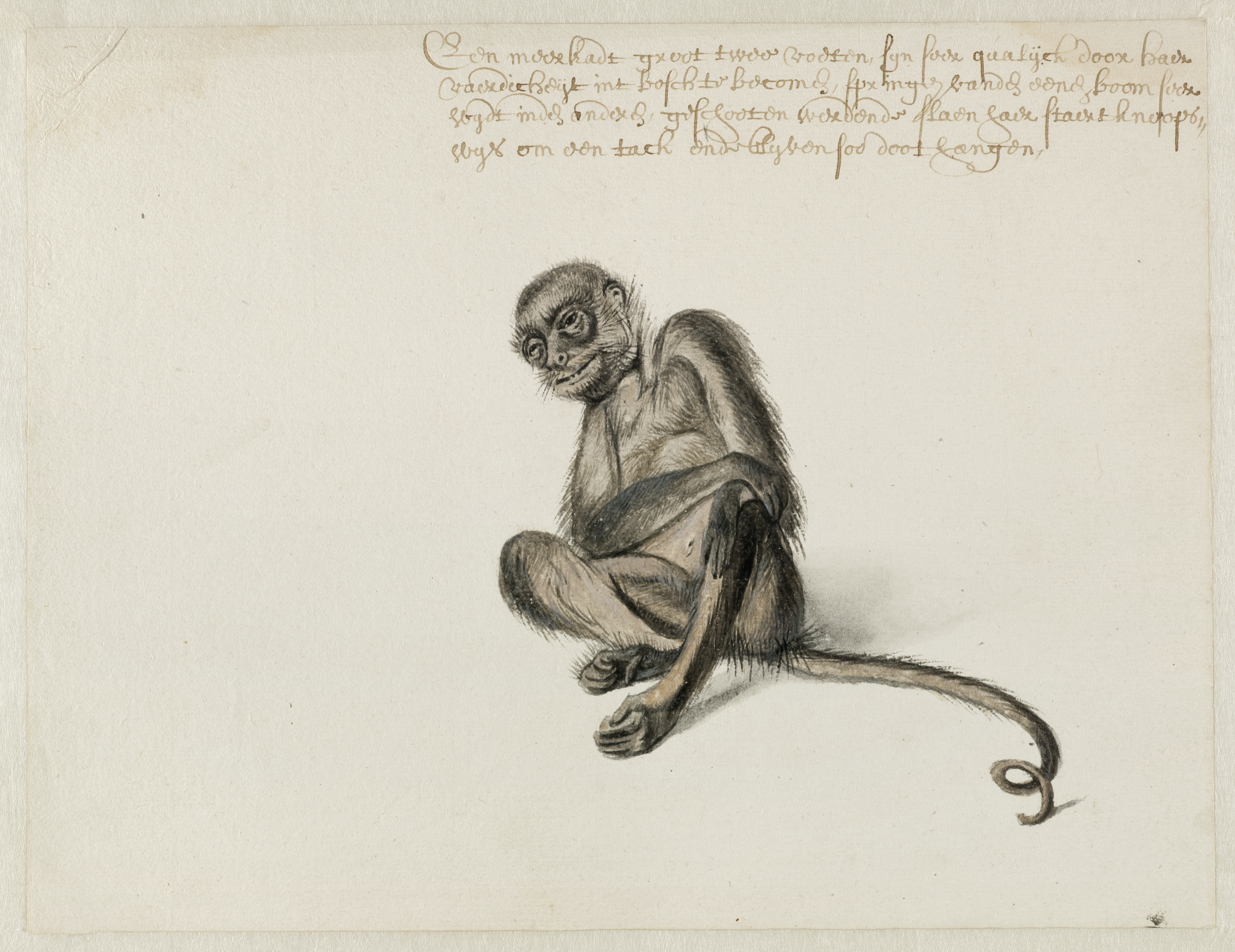
Study of a monkey by Frans Post, ca. 1637-1644

In the middle ground, a stone building is perched on a modest incline surrounded by palm trees, with vines growing up the sides. A meandering line of people are seemingly heading into the building which appears to be a Catholic church, though aspects of the structure look broken. In fact, large pieces of broken stone pillars are visible on the right, being overtaken by lush blue shrubbery. It can be assumed that the structure was damaged during the Dutch takeover from the Portuguese. An altarpiece is visible through an archway into the church space. The figures appear to be a mixture of Portuguese colonizers and enslaved African people, according to their dress and skin color. The women in line wear long veils, some men wear large hats, and cassocked preachers stand by the door and greet attendees. Downhill and further away (nearing the background), a different small group of people can be seen, appearing to be several enslaved African people, with a few more-clothed presumably-Dutch persons standing nearby. The African people appear to be carrying a palanquin, which most likely had a Portuguese woman inside. There are also a few structures that look like two-story homes populating the downward slope of the hill, and there is a small quite ruined-looking structure uphill from and behind the church. Bluish shrubbery grows around and on top of it, enhancing the quality of dilapidation.

In the background, the gently undulating terrain recedes toward the horizon line, where Post utilized atmospheric perspective (e.g. a monochromatic color scheme, lightening in value near the horizon) to convey great distance. Some fluffy white clouds drift overhead in the mostly blue sky.

== The Frame ==
The painting is still paired with a frame believed to be made specifically for this painting, the creator of which is unknown. It features wood-carved depictions of flora and fauna, such as passionflower, watermelon, hops - European and non-European plants - with laurel and acanthus throughout, a nod to Classicist style. It also features animal life, such as the praying mantis, tarantula, scorpion, centipede, and snake, among others. It has been theorized that some of the creatures have been modeled after plants and animals Post had painted in prior landscapes, as well as from naturalist illustrations of the time. Though now the frame looks like untreated wood, it is believed that it was at one point either gilded or painted.
