= Bonheur du jour =

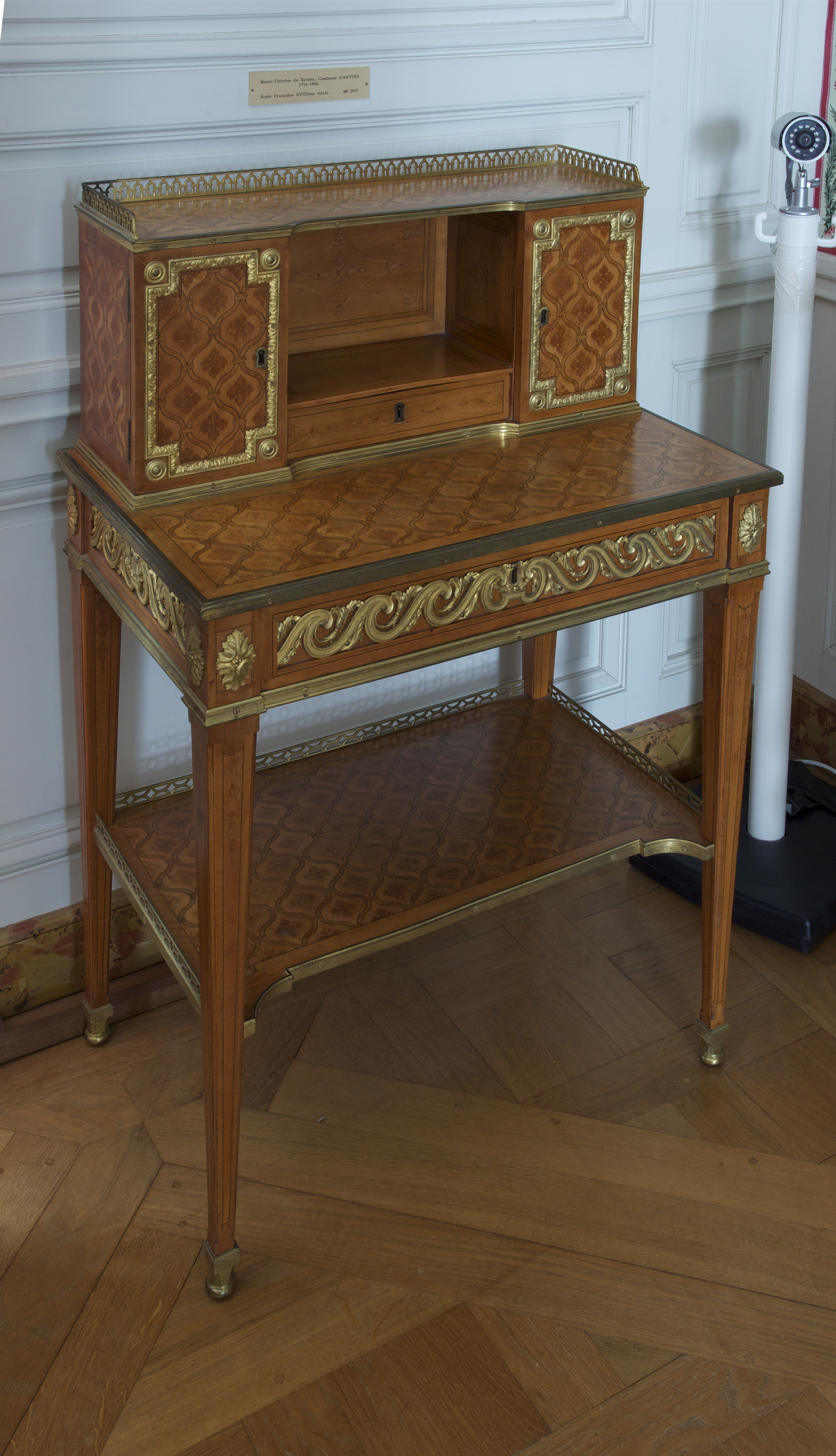
Bonheur du jour, now in the Palace of Versailles, attributed to Jean Henri Riesener

A bonheur du jour (in French, bonheur-du-jour, meaning "daytime delight") is a type of lady's writing desk. It was introduced in Paris by one of the interior decorators and purveyors of fashionable novelties called marchands-merciers about 1760, and speedily became intensely fashionable. The bonheur du jour is always very light and graceful, with a decorated back, since it often did not stand against the wall (meuble meublant) but was moved about the room (meuble volant); its special characteristic is a raised back, which may form a little cabinet or a nest of drawers, or open shelves, which might be closed with a tambour, or may simply be fitted with a mirror. The top, often surrounded with a chased and gilded bronze gallery, serves for placing small ornaments. Beneath the writing surface there is usually a single drawer, often neatly fitted for toiletries or writing supplies. Early examples were raised on slender cabriole legs; under the influence of neoclassicism, examples made after about 1775 had straight, tapering legs.

The marchand-mercier Simon-Philippe Poirier had the idea of mounting bonheurs du jour with specially-made plaques of Sèvres porcelain that he commissioned and for which he had a monopoly; the earliest Sèvres-mounted bonheurs du jour are datable from the marks under their plaques to 1766-67 (illus.). Other choice examples of the time are inlaid with marquetry or panels of Oriental lacquer, banded with exotic woods, with gilt-bronze mounts.

By the mid-1770s, the bonheur du jour was being made in London, where it was simply called a "lady's writing-desk".

The desk was usually kept in the lady's bedroom where it would serve for breakfast as well as for writing letters during the day. Letter writing was one of the favorite pastimes of ladies of high birth.

== Gallery ==
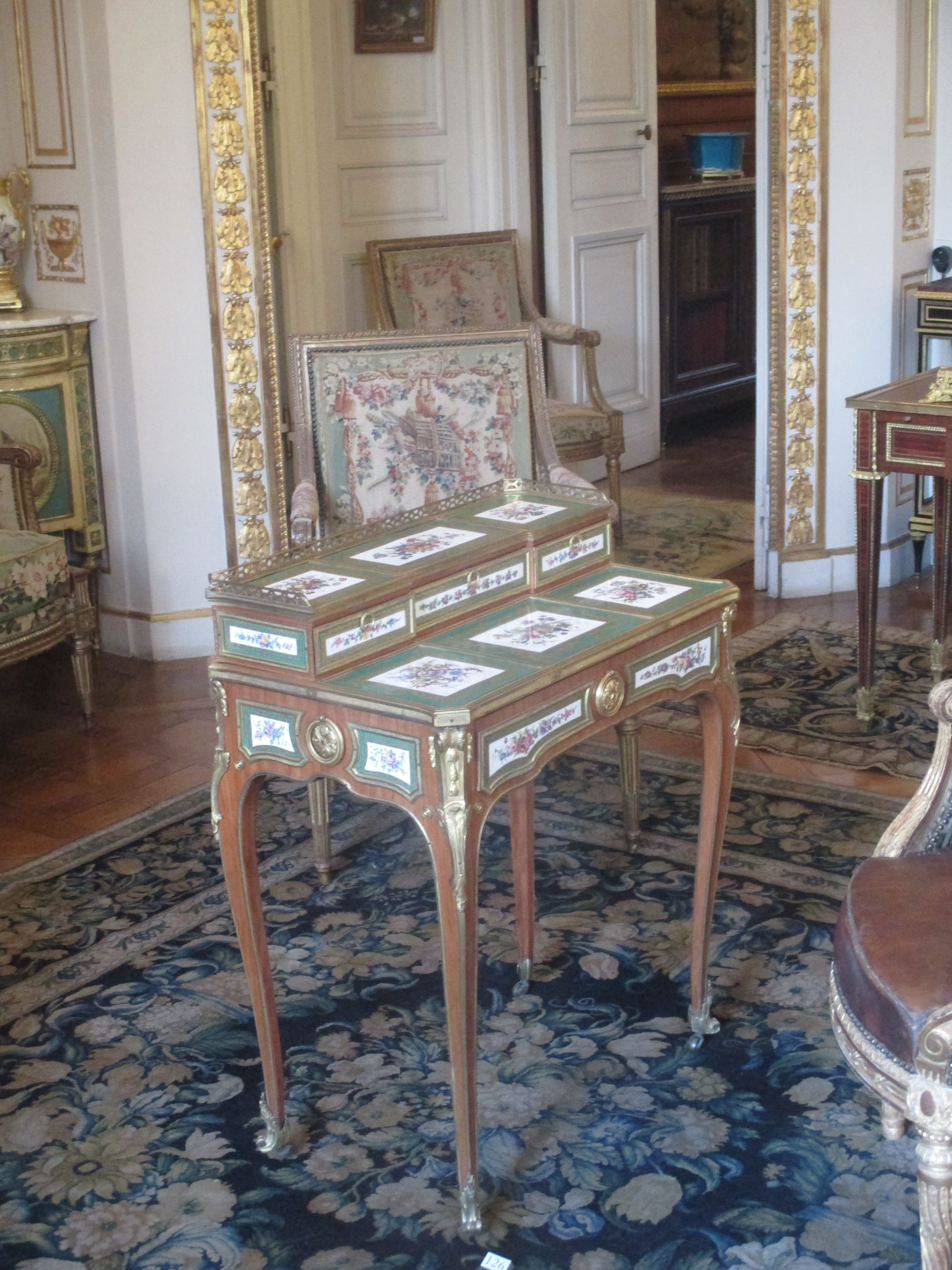
Bonheur du jour mounted with Sèvres plaques, stamped by Martin Carlin, commissioned by Poirier, the plaques dated 1766 (Musée Nissim de Camondo, Paris)

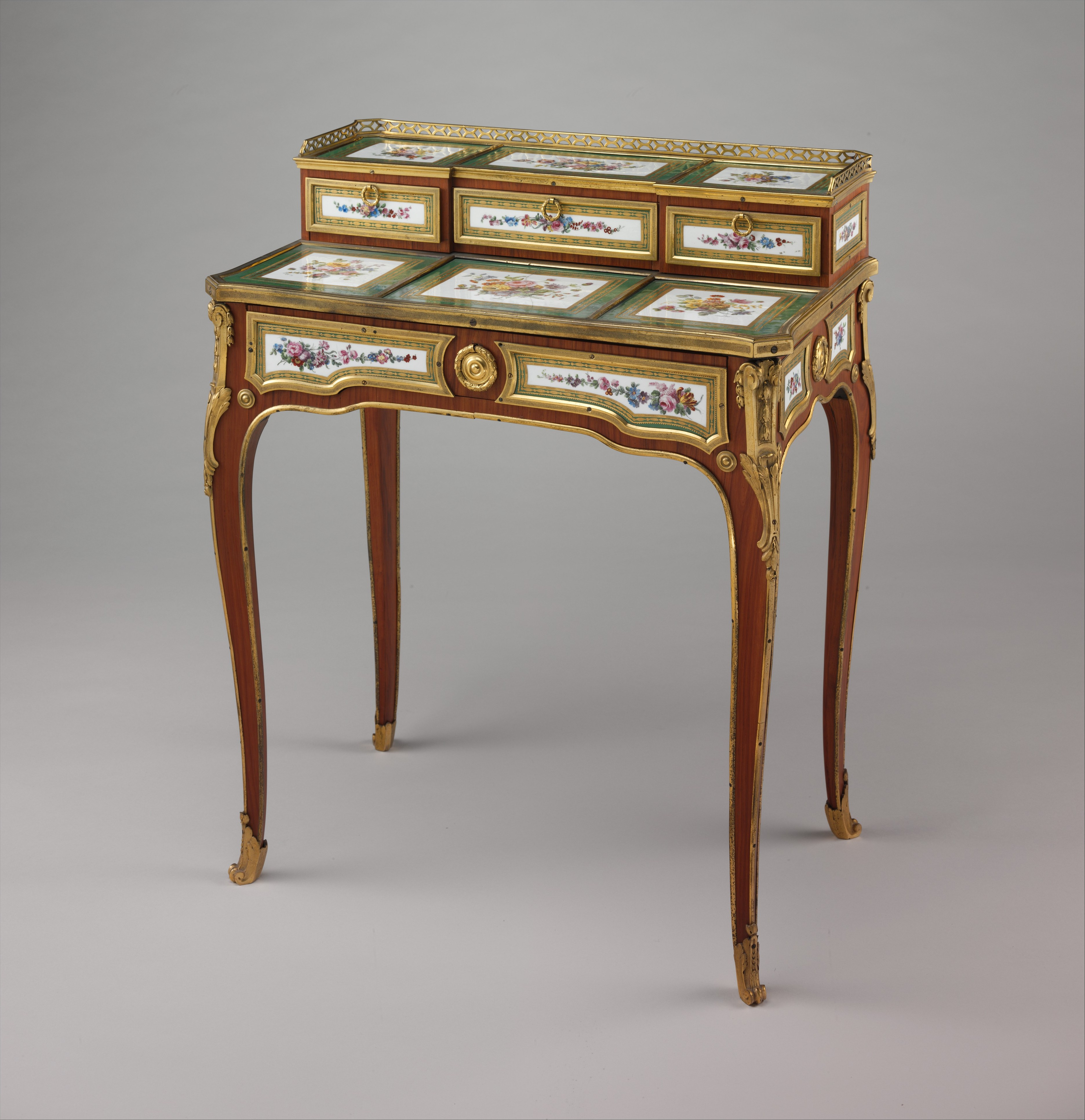
Small writing desk (bonheur-du-jour) by Martin Carlin at the Met Museum, dated to 1768

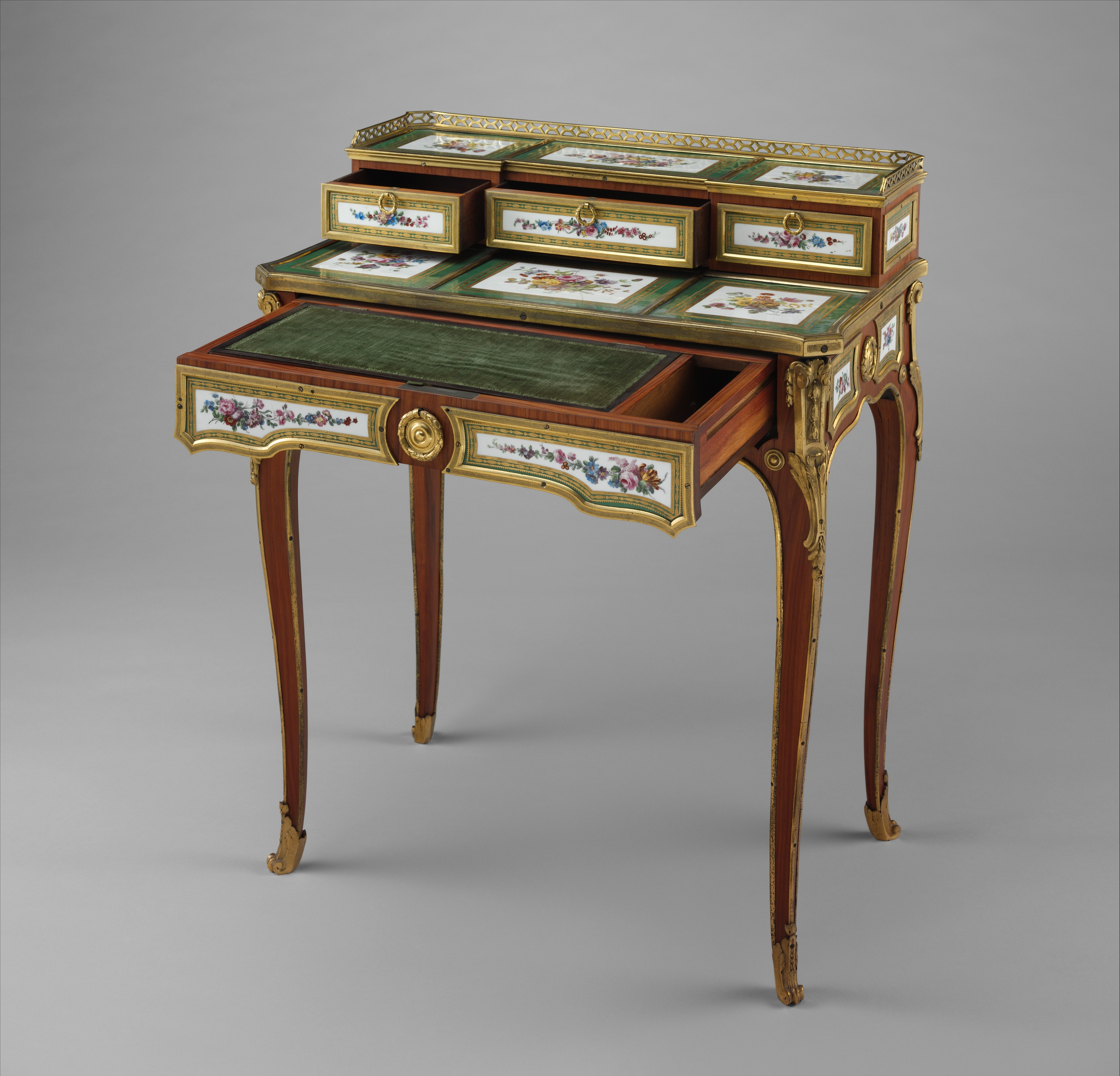
Small writing desk (bonheur-du-jour) by Martin Carlin at the Met Museum, drawers open, circa 1774

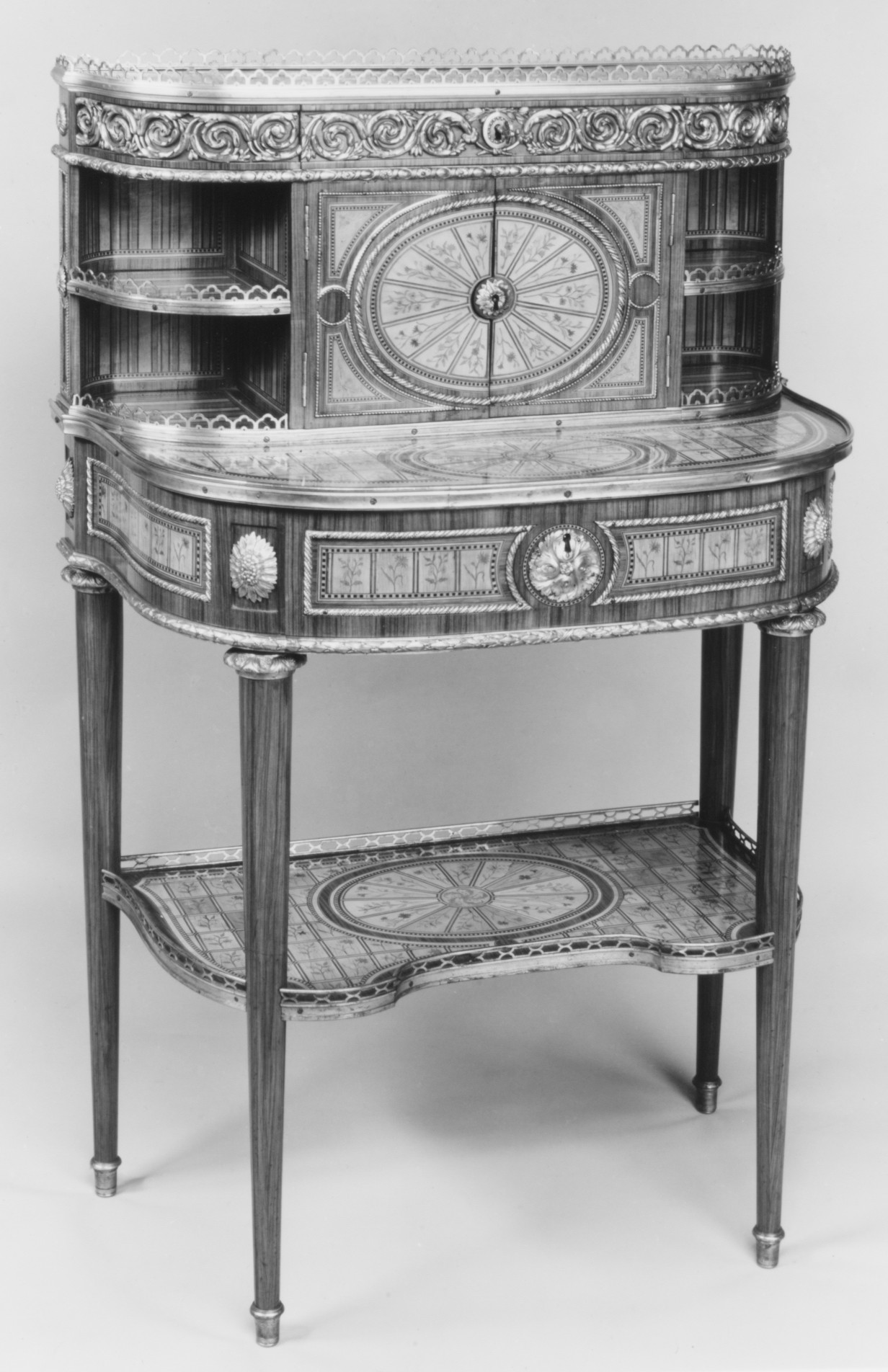
Desk (bonheur du jour) by Roger Vandercruse, called Lacroix, circa 1780–90 at The Metropolitan Museum of Art
