= Frans Post =

Dutch painter

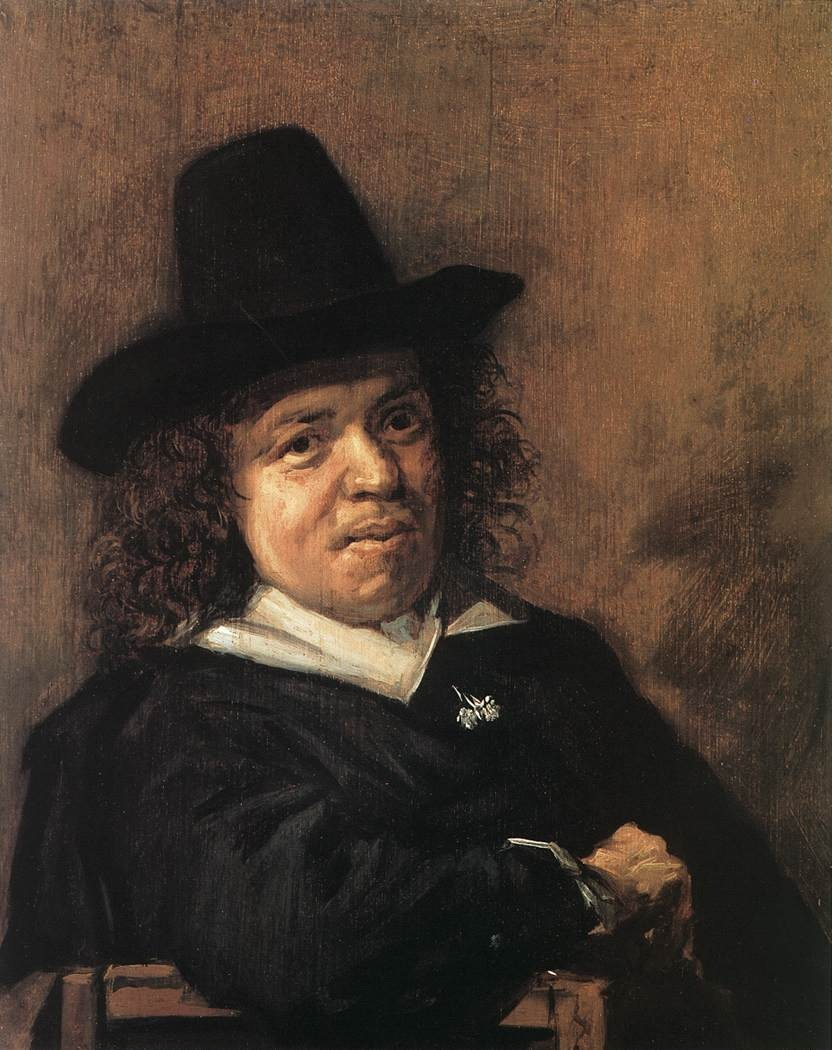
- Portrait of Frans Post by Frans Hals
- Born: Frans Janszoon; 1612; Haarlem
- Died: February 17, 1680 (aged 67); Haarlem
- Education: Haarlem Guild of St. Luke
- Known for: Painting
- Notable work: Landscape art
- Movement: Baroque
- Patrons: Johan Maurits van Nassau-Siegen

Frans Janszoon Post (17 November 1612 – 17 February 1680) was a painter during the Dutch Golden Age. He was the first European artist to paint landscapes of the Americas, during and after the period of Dutch Brazil. In 1636 he traveled to Dutch Brazil in northeast of South America at the invitation of the governor Johan Maurits van Nassau-Siegen. His works were widely collected in the Netherlands, Europe, and Brazil, with the works showing an idealized vision of Dutch colonial rule.

== Biography ==
Post was born in Haarlem and was the son of Jan Janszoon Post, a highly regarded glass painter trained in Leiden, and Francijntje Verbraken of Haarlem. His elder brother was Pieter Post, one of the most important architects of Dutch classicism. Little is known of his life before his trip to Brazil.

He was born in Haarlem circa 1612 and he most likely received his early training from his father and his elder brother. He was a contemporary of Frans Hals, who painted his portrait, and prominent Haarlem landscape painters such as the brothers Jacob and Salomon van Ruysdael, Adriaen and Isaac van Ostade, and in particular Pieter de Molijn. It is likely that a Dutch master also taught him before he left for Brazil, though he was not registered in the guild until after his return. Although it is not universally accepted, Post scholar Erik Larsen believes De Molijn was the master under whom Post studied, because Molyn is mentioned in Houbraken as the teacher of several other landscape painters, such as Allart van Everdingen.

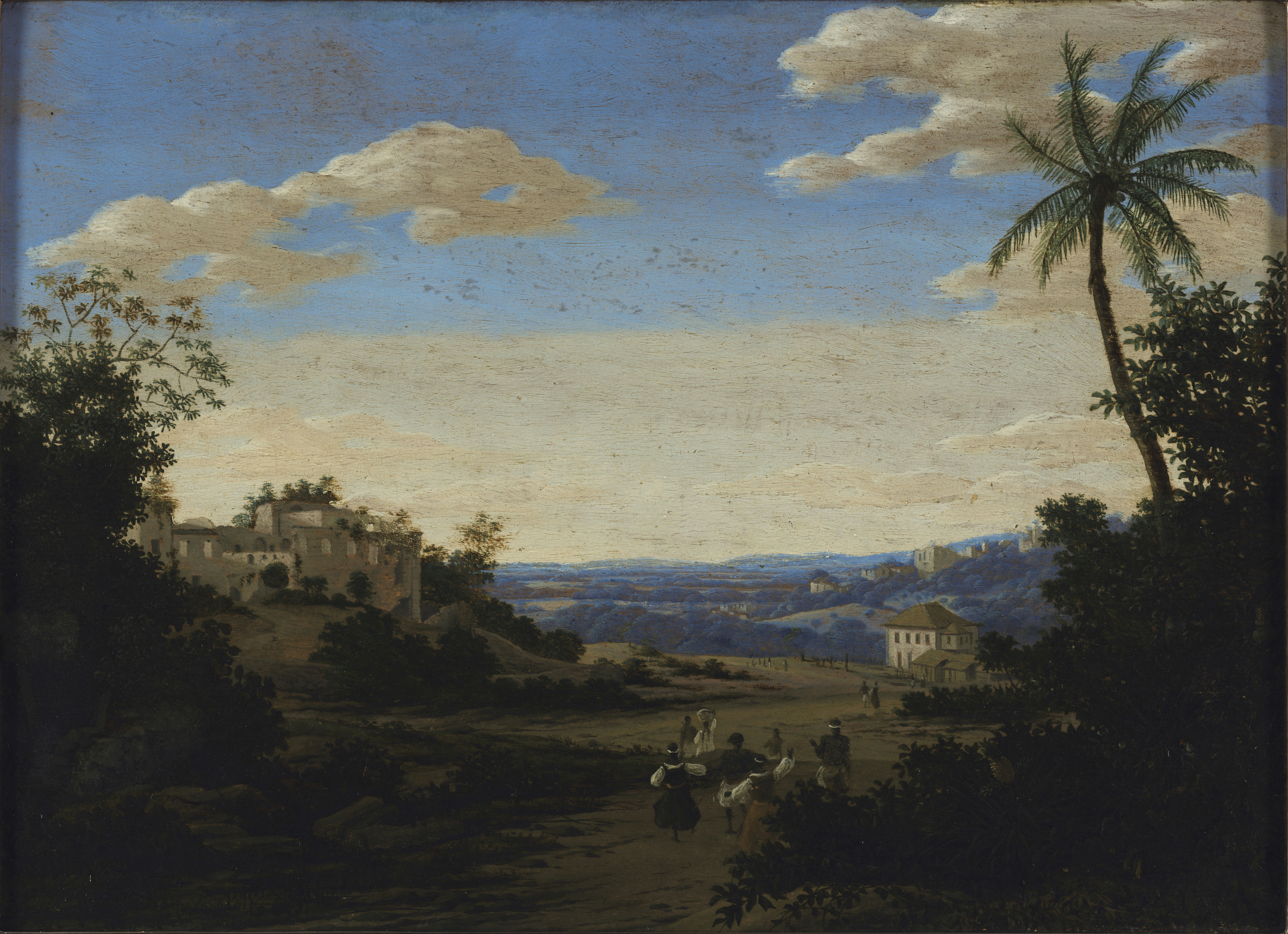
View of Pernambuco, Brazil, c. 1637–44, Museu Nacional de Belas Artes

Post won a commission at court likely through the connections of his older brother and was encouraged to travel abroad by John Maurice, Prince of Nassau-Siegen. At the time, Haarlem experienced an outbreak of the plague, so that his going to Brazil may have seemed a good option. Post lived in Brazil from 1637 to 1644. He received 800 guilders for a landscape painting in the West Indies commissioned by Frederick Henry, Prince of Orange, leading Larsen to believe that Post set out for the Netherlands via Africa shortly before Nassau departed Brazil. After he returned to the Netherlands, he joined the Haarlem Guild of St. Luke in 1646, and was appointed officer in 1656–7 and 1658. In 1650, he married Jannetje Bogaert, the daughter of Professor Salomon Bogaert of the Haarlem ‘Latijnsche School’. He had two sons, who died before his death and one daughter that did survive him, but died shortly thereafter.

Post continued to paint Brazilian scenes until 1669, and the lack of dated paintings in the 1670s suggests he stopped ten years before his death. Whitehead and Boeseman claim that Post developed an alcohol problem, which may be the reason, so little is known of the last decade of his life. He died in Haarlem and was buried in the St. Bavochurch on February 17, 1680.

== Work ==
Post produced approximately 140 paintings during his lifetime. Of these, nearly half are dated, making it possible to track the evolution of his work between 1637, the day he landed in Brazil, and 1669, the date of his last letter. The paintings Post produced while he was in Brazil drastically differ from those he painted after he left Brazil. While he was in Brazil, he produced a large number of sketches and etchings, but only completed six paintings. They are the paintings dated from 1637–1640, and later presented by Nassau to Louis XIV in 1679.

His Brazilian works strongly resemble the landscapes by his Haarlem contemporaries in terms of composition, style, and technique. Wolfgang Stechow describes Post’s landscapes as ‘the old bottle filled with new wine’. These works depict specific locations in Dutch Brazil, identifiable because of the representation of recognizable topography and buildings; most also include water. Post includes a selection of Brazilian vegetation, and occasionally features birds and other small animals in the foreground. These may have been inspired by his traveling companion, the naturalist Georg Marcgraf. The skies are a curious gray, seemingly heavy with rain, an aspect that is emphasized by the fact that they take up at least half the canvas. The subdued color scheme, especially when compared to his post-Brazilian production, lends them a somber almost reverential quality characteristic of Dutch tonal landscapes from the 1620s to the 1640s.

== Brazilian landscapes from Haarlem ==
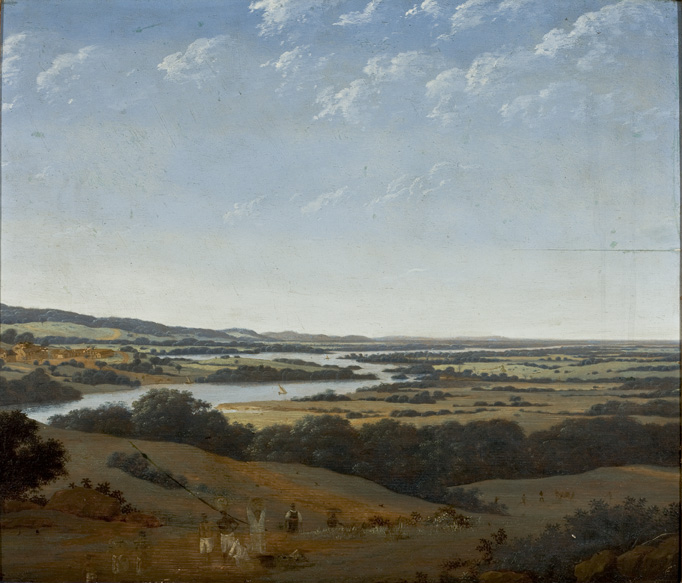
View of Pernambuco in 1649, which looks very much like the dunes of Kennemerland

Post continued to paint images of Brazil upon his return to the Netherlands in 1642; however, his work undergoes a radical transformation. In addition to Post’s wonderful imagination, the evolution of his work may also be consequent of a change in popular style. The further he was from Brazil, in both time and space, the more imaginary his paintings became as he incorporated bright colors and exotic elements. Those paintings executed in the Netherlands have brighter colors with dark foliage framing an idealized baroque composition. These works are in striking contrast to the stark, realistic qualities of his early work. The landscapes are open, full of resources, and most important, conquered. They evolve to show a more condensed view and desired depth with greener flora, bluer skies, and brighter horizons. However, the horizontal blues advancing towards the middle distance accentuate the difference in color. This deep blue may be a disintegration of the green pigment, which results from the disappearance of yellows, while the blues remain.

Upon Post’s return to the Netherlands, he also increased the number of figures and incorporated greater diversity into his work. Nearly every painting he completed in the Netherlands includes a large group of people interacting in some way, whether they are dancing or working in the sugar mills. Typically, these figures are slaves. Unlike his Brazilian work, the figures are no longer subjects placed in the foreground; instead, they seem to become part of the landscape. Four of the six paintings completed in Brazil only have a few figures, with the exception of Porto Calvo (1639) depicting more, and The River of São Francisco (1638), which does not have any figures. While Post was in charge of documenting the land, Albert Eckhout, another one of Nassau’s artists, was in charge of documenting the native people.

== See also ==
- Albert Eckhout
- Dutch Golden Age painting
- List of paintings by Frans Post
- Gillis Peeters the Elder
- Zacharias Wagenaer
- Ricardo Brennand Institute
