= 2022 Maranhão gubernatorial election =

General election

2022 Maranhão state election
- 2 October 2022 (first round); 30 October 2022 (second round, if necessary)
- Opinion polls
- Gubernatorial election
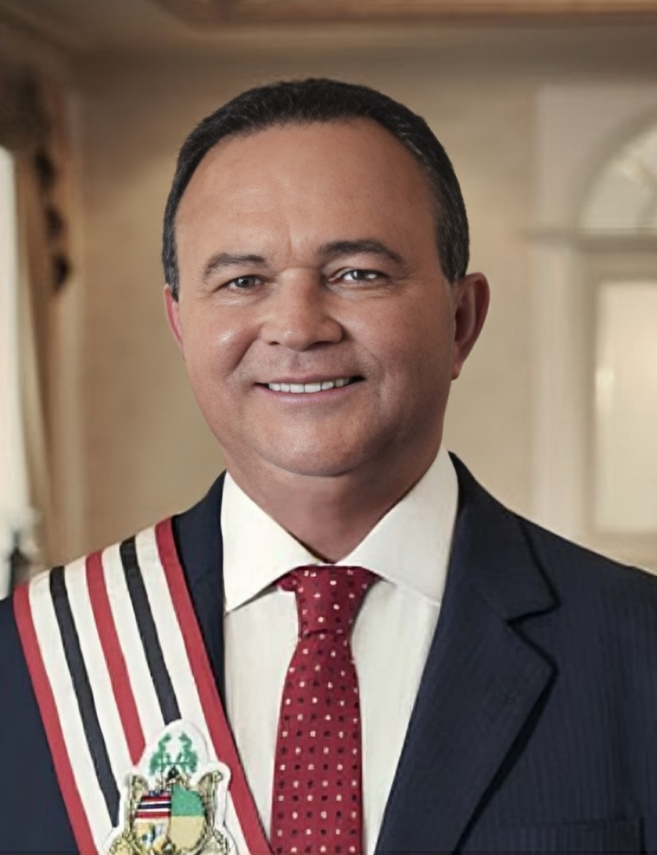

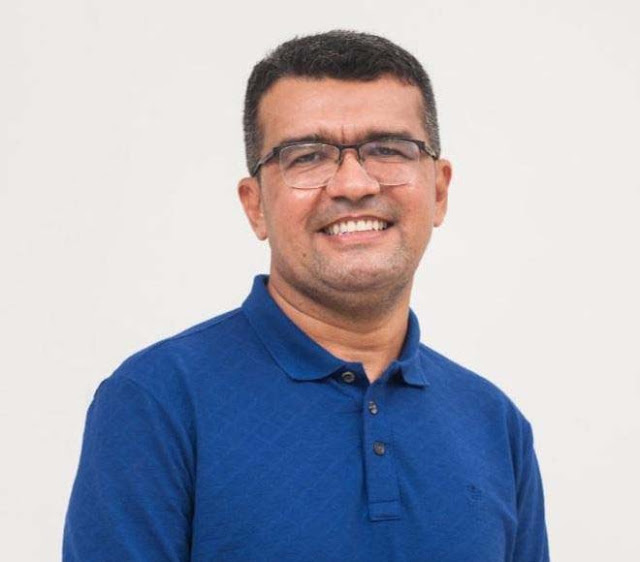

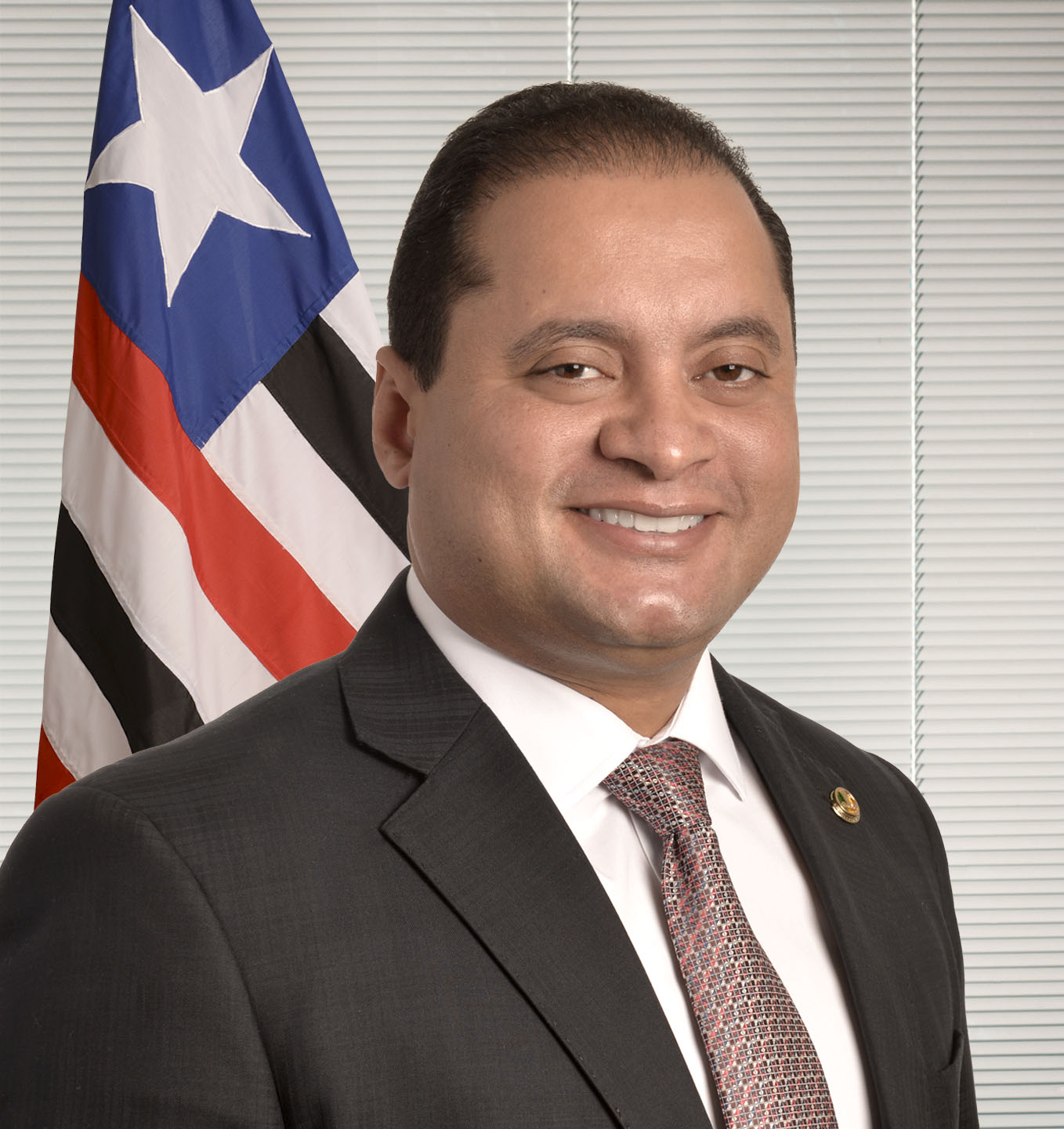
Candidate	Carlos Brandão	Lahesio Bonfim	Weverton Rocha
Party	PSB	PSC	PDT
Alliance	For the good of Maranhão	Courage to Change Maranhão	Together for Work
Running mate	Felipe Camarão	Gutemberg Araújo	Hélio Soares
- Candidate with the most votes per municipality (217): Carlos Brandão (177 municipalities); Weverton Rocha (24 municipalities); Lahesio Bonfim (16 municipalities)
Incumbent Governor
Carlos Brandão
PSB
- Parliamentary election
- All 42 seats of the Legislative Assembly
Party	Leader	Vote %	Seats	+/–
Legislative Assembly
PSB	None	23.28	11	+9
PL	None	10.32	5	+2
PP	None	9.23	4	+2
PDT	None	9.00	4	−3
PCdoB	None	6.59	5	−1
Patriota	None	6.28	3	+3
PSD	None	5.60	2	+2
MDB	None	5.47	2	0
PODE	None	4.75	2	+2
PSC	None	3.90	2	+2
PT	None	3.47	0	−1
Republicanos	None	2.46	1	0
PV	None	1.35	0	−3
This lists parties that won seats. See the complete results below.
- Senatorial election
- 2 October 2022 (one-only round)
- Opinion polls
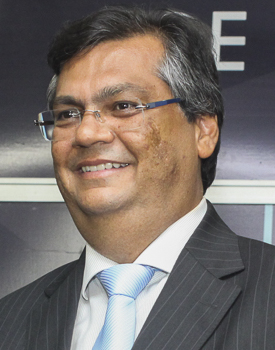

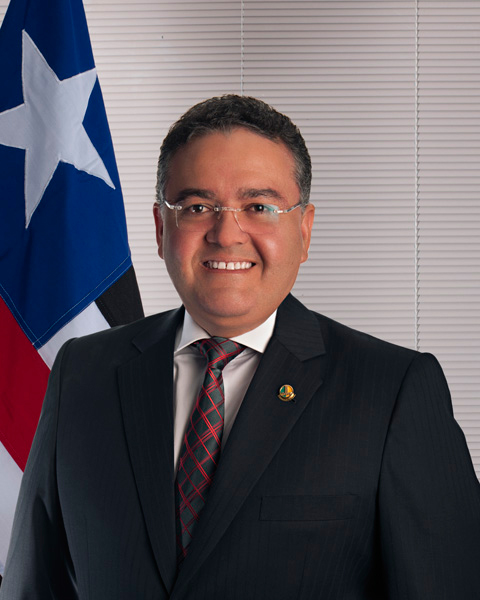
Candidate	Flávio Dino	Roberto Rocha
Party	PSB	PTB
Alliance	For the good of Maranhão	Together for Work
Popular vote	2,125,811	1,211,174
Percentage	62.41%	35.56%
Senator before election
Roberto Rocha
PTB
Elected Senator
Flávio Dino
PSB

The 2022 Maranhão gubernatorial election took place in the state of Maranhão, Brazil on 2 October 2022, as part of the 2022 Brazilian general election in the Federal District and the 26 states. Voters will elect a Governor, Vice Governor, one Senator, two Alternate Senators, 18 representatives for the Chamber of Deputies, and 42 Legislative Assembly members. Under the Constitution of Brazil, the governor will be elected for a four-year term starting 1 January 2023 and with the approval of Constitutional Amendment No. 111, it will end on 6 January 2027. If the first place does not reach more than 50% of the valid votes, a second round will be held on 30 October 2022.

The incumbent governor of Maranhão is Carlos Brandão, a member of the Brazilian Socialist Party (PSB), who took office after the resignation of Flávio Dino (PSB) on 2 April 2022. Dino resigned to run for the Federal Senate. For the election to the Federal Senate, the seat occupied by Roberto Rocha (PTB) since 2014, is at dispute, and the incumbent said that he intends to run for re-election.

== Electoral calendar ==
Note: This section only presents the main dates of the 2022 electoral calendar, check the TSE official website (in Portuguese) and other official sources for detailed information.

Electoral calendar
15 May	Start of crowdfunding of candidates
20 July – 5 August	Party conventions for choosing candidates and coalitions
16 August – 30 September	Period of exhibition of free electoral propaganda on radio, television and on the internet related to the first round
2 October	First round of 2022 elections
7–28 October	Period of exhibition of free electoral propaganda on radio, television and on the internet related to a possible second round
30 October	Possible second round of 2022 elections
until 19 December	Delivery of electoral diplomas for those who were elected in the 2022 elections by the Brazilian Election Justice

== Legislative Assembly ==
The result of the last state election and the current situation in the Legislative Assembly of Maranhão is given below:

Affiliation	Members		+/–
Affiliation	Elected	Current	+/–
PSB	2	9	▲7
PDT	7	6	▼1
PP	2	5	▲3
PSD	0	4	▲4
PL	3	4	▲1
PCdoB	6	4	▼2
PV	3	3	Steady
MDB	2	2	Steady
UNIÃO	New	1	▲1
PODE	0	1	▲1
PROS	0	1	▲1
PT	1	1	Steady
Solidarity	3	1	▼2
PSDB	1	0	▼1
Republicanos	1	0	▼1
PTB	1	0	▼1
PMN	1	0	▼1
PSL	1	0	▼1
PROS	1	0	▼1
PRTB	2	0	▼2
DEM	5	0	▼5
Total	42		–

== Gubernatorial candidates ==
The party conventions began on 20 July and will continue until 5 August. The following political parties have already confirmed their candidacies. Political parties have until 15 August 2022 to formally register their candidates.

=== Confirmed candidates ===
Party	Candidate	Most relevant political office or occupation	Party	Running mate	Coalition	Electoral number	TV time per party/coalition	Refs.
Brazilian Socialist Party (PSB)	Carlos Brandão	Governor of Maranhão (since 2022)	Workers' Party (PT)	Felipe Camarão	For the good of Maranhão: Brazilian Socialist Party (PSB); Brazil of Hope; Workers' Party (PT); Communist Party of Brazil (PCdoB); Green Party (PV); Always forward; Brazilian Social Democracy Party (PSDB); Cidadania; Brazilian Democratic Movement (MDB); Patriota; Progressistas (PP); Podemos (PODE)	40	5min and 16sec	
Democratic Labour Party (PDT)	Weverton Rocha	Senator for Maranhão (since 2019)	Liberal Party (PL)	Hélio Soares	Together for Work: Democratic Labour Party (PDT); Liberal Party (PL); Brazilian Labour Party (PTB); Republicans; Act (AGIR); Republican Party of the Social Order (PROS)	12	2min and 35sec	
Social Democratic Party (PSD)	Edivaldo Holanda Júnior	Mayor of São Luís (2013–2021)	Social Democratic Party (PSD)	Teacher Andrea Heringer	A Better Maranhão for Everybody: Social Democratic Party (PSD); Brazilian Labour Renewal Party (PRTB)	55	57sec	
Solidariedade	Simplício Araújo	Federal Deputy from Maranhão (2011–2015; since 2019)	Solidariedade	Dra. Marly	—N/a	77	27sec	
Socialism and Liberty Party (PSOL)	Enilton Rodrigues	Engineer.	Socialism and Liberty Party (PSOL)	Pedra Celestina	PSOL REDE Federation: Socialism and Liberty Party (PSOL); Sustainability Network (REDE)	50	24sec	
Social Christian Party (PSC)	Lahesio Bonfim	Mayor of São Pedro dos Crentes (2017–2022)	Social Christian Party (PSC)	Dr. Gutemberg	Courage to Change Maranhão: Social Christian Party (PSC); Party of National Mobilization (PMN)	20	19sec	
Christian Democracy (DC)	Teacher Joás Moraes	Teacher.	Christian Democracy (DC)	Ricardo Medeiros	—N/a	27	—N/a	
United Socialist Workers' Party (PSTU)	Hertz Dias	Teacher.	United Socialist Workers' Party (PSTU)	Jayro Mesquita	—N/a	16	—N/a	
Brazilian Communist Party (PCB)	Frankle Costa	Photographer.	Brazilian Communist Party (PCB)	Zé JK	—N/a	21	—N/a	
The television time reserved for political propaganda for each election will be distributed among all parties and coalitions that have a candidate and representation in the Chamber of Deputies.							Total: 10 minutes	

=== Withdrawn candidates ===
- Josimar Maranhãozinho (PL) - Mayor of Maranhãozinho (2005–2012), state deputy of Maranhão (2015–2019) and federal deputy from Maranhão (since 2019). Josimar Maranhãozinho withdrew his candidacy on 23 May 2022. He decided to run for re-election to the Chamber of Deputies. After voting with fellow party members, he declared support for Weverton Rocha's candidacy, nominating the running mate on Rocha's ticket.
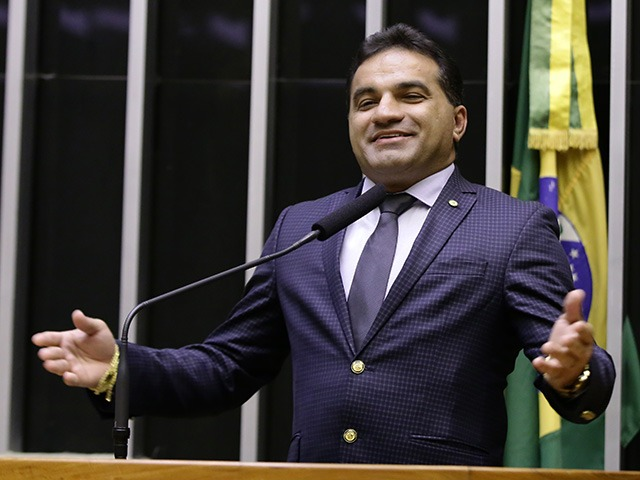
Federal Deputy from Maranhão
Josimar Maranhãozinho (PL)
(since 2019)

== Senatorial candidates ==
The party conventions began on 20 July and will continue until 5 August. The following political parties have already confirmed their candidacies. Political parties have until 15 August 2022 to formally register their candidates.

=== Confirmed candidates ===
Party	Candidate	Most relevant political office or occupation	Party	Candidates for Alternate Senators	Coalition	Electoral number	TV time per party/coalition	Refs.
Brazilian Socialist Party (PSB)	Flávio Dino	Governor of Maranhão (2015–2022)	Brazilian Socialist Party (PSB)	1st alternate senator: Ana Paula Lobato	For the good of Maranhão: Brazilian Socialist Party (PSB); Brazil of Hope; Workers' Party (PT); Communist Party of Brazil (PCdoB); Green Party (PV); Always forward; Brazilian Social Democracy Party (PSDB); Cidadania; Brazilian Democratic Movement (MDB); Patriota; Progressistas (PP); Podemos (PODE)	400	3min and 7sec	
Brazilian Socialist Party (PSB)	Flávio Dino	Governor of Maranhão (2015–2022)	Communist Party of Brazil (PCdoB)	2nd alternate senator: Lourdinha	For the good of Maranhão: Brazilian Socialist Party (PSB); Brazil of Hope; Workers' Party (PT); Communist Party of Brazil (PCdoB); Green Party (PV); Always forward; Brazilian Social Democracy Party (PSDB); Cidadania; Brazilian Democratic Movement (MDB); Patriota; Progressistas (PP); Podemos (PODE)	400	3min and 7sec	
Brazilian Labour Party (PTB)	Roberto Rocha	Senator for Maranhão (since 2015)	Liberal Party (PL)	1st alternate senator: Ildemar Gonçalves	Together for Work: Democratic Labour Party (PDT); Liberal Party (PL); Brazilian Labour Party (PTB); Republicans; Act (AGIR); Republican Party of the Social Order (PROS)	145	1min and 34sec	
Brazilian Labour Party (PTB)	Roberto Rocha	Senator for Maranhão (since 2015)	Act (AGIR)	2nd alternate senator: Pastor Bel	Together for Work: Democratic Labour Party (PDT); Liberal Party (PL); Brazilian Labour Party (PTB); Republicans; Act (AGIR); Republican Party of the Social Order (PROS)	145	1min and 34sec	
Socialism and Liberty Party (PSOL)	Antônia Cariongo	Rural worker.	Socialism and Liberty Party (PSOL)	1st alternate senator: Teacher Antônio Alves	PSOL REDE Federation: Socialism and Liberty Party (PSOL); Sustainability Network (REDE)	500	18sec	
Socialism and Liberty Party (PSOL)	Antônia Cariongo	Rural worker.	Socialism and Liberty Party (PSOL)	2nd alternate senator: Deco	PSOL REDE Federation: Socialism and Liberty Party (PSOL); Sustainability Network (REDE)	500	18sec	
Christian Democracy (DC)	Pastor Ivo Nogueira	Teacher and pastor.	Christian Democracy (DC)	1st alternate senator: Ana Lúcia	—N/a	277	—N/a	
Christian Democracy (DC)	Pastor Ivo Nogueira	Teacher and pastor.	Christian Democracy (DC)	2nd alternate senator: Celso Raposo	—N/a	277	—N/a	
United Socialist Workers' Party (PSTU)	Saulo Arcangeli	Civil Servant.	United Socialist Workers' Party (PSTU)	1st alternate senator: Wagner Silva	—N/a	161	—N/a	
United Socialist Workers' Party (PSTU)	Saulo Arcangeli	Civil Servant.	United Socialist Workers' Party (PSTU)	2nd alternate senator: Hernando Cunha	—N/a	161	—N/a	
The television time reserved for political propaganda for each election will be distributed among all parties and coalitions that have a candidate and representation in the Chamber of Deputies.							Total: 5 minutes	

== Opinion polls ==
=== First round ===
The first round is scheduled to take place on 2 October 2022.

Pollster/client(s)	Date(s) conducted	Sample size	Weverton PDT	Brandão PSB	Lahésio PSC	Edivaldo PSD	Joás DC	Simplício Solidariedade	Enilton PSOL	Hertz PSTU	Others	Abst. Undec.	Lead
IPEC	20–23 Aug 2022	800	16%	28%	10%	14%	2%	1%	1%	–	1% (Note: Frankle Costa (PCB) with 1%)	28%	12%
Instituto MBO	12–16 Aug 2022	1.584	28.73%	19.44%	18.21%	2.15%	0.12%	0.94%	–	–	–	30.5%	9.29%
Econométrica	11–15 Aug 2022	1.503	21.4%	40.7%	20.5%	7.5%	1.1%	0.3%	0.1%	0.1%	–	8.4%	19.3%
Data Ilha	10–13 Aug 2022	2.031	18.1%	27.4%	16.3%	9.7%	0.4%	2%	0.7%	0.9%	0.6% (Note: Frankle Costa (PCB) with 0.6%)	23.7%	9.3%
Pesquisa Exata	7–12 Aug 2022	1.469	29%	30%	16%	10%	1%	1%	1%	0%	0% (Note: Frankle Costa (PCB) with 0%)	12%	1%
Pesquisa Exata	7–12 Aug 2022	1.469	31%	31%	17%	10%	–	–	–	–	–	11%	Tie
Econométrica	19–22 Jul 2022	1.535	23.6%	34.8%	20.5%	7.6%	–	0.5%	1%	0.1%	–	12%	11.2%
Pesquisa Exata	12–17 Jul 2022	1.475	29%	27%	15%	12%	–	2%	0%	1%	–	14%	2%
Escutec/Imirante	2–7 Jul 2022	2.000	22%	27%	16%	11%	–	2%	1%	1%	–	20%	5%
Real Time Big Data	20–21 Jun 2022	1.500	24%	22%	13%	12%	–	1%	0%	0%	–	28%	2%
Econométrica	12–16 Jun 2022	1.468	25.1%	32.5%	18.2%	9.4%	–	0.3%	0.7%	–	–	13.9%	7.4%
Escutec/Imirante	11–16 Jun 2022	2.000	23%	27%	15%	11%	–	3%	1%	1%	–	19%	4%
Pesquisa Exata	5–9 Jun 2022	1.451	29%	24%	14%	11%	–	2%	–	1%	–	19%	5%
Pesquisa Exata	5–9 Jun 2022	1.451	31%	25%	14%	12%	–	–	–	–	–	18%	6%
23 May 2022	Josimar Maranhãozinho withdraws from the race and decides to support Weverton Rocha's candidacy.												
Pollster/client(s)	Date(s) conducted	Sample size	Weverton PDT	Brandão PSB	Lahésio PSC	Edivaldo PSD	Josimar PL	Simplício Solidariedade	Enilton PSOL	Hertz PSTU	Others	Abst. Undec.	Lead
Instituto MBO	6–10 May 2022	1.315	24.42%	14.99%	21.75%	1.97%	5.09%	1.06%	–	–	5.24% (Note: Roberto Rocha (PTB) with 5.24%)	23.89%	2.67%
Escutec/Imirante	26–30 Apr 2022	2.000	20%	24%	11%	12%	3%	2%	1%	0%	8% (Note: Roberto Rocha (PTB) with 8%)	19%	4%
Escutec/Imirante	26–30 Apr 2022	2.000	21%	25%	13%	12%	–	2%	–	–	9% (Note: Roberto Rocha (PTB) with 9%)	18%	4%
Escutec/Imirante	26–30 Apr 2022	2.000	23%	26%	14%	15%	–	3%	–	–	–	19%	3%
Apr 2022	Roberto Rocha withdrawns his candidacy for the government of Maranhão and decides to run for the Federal Senate.												
Pollster/client(s)	Date(s) conducted	Sample size	Weverton PDT	Brandão PSB	Rocha PTB	Edivaldo PSD	Enilton PSOL	Lahésio PSC	Simplício Solidariedade	Hertz PSTU	Others	Abst. Undec.	Lead
Pesquisa Exata	25–29 Apr 2022	1.400	22%	21%	11%	11%	0%	12%	1%	0%	5% (Note: Josimar Maranhãozinho (PL) with 5%)	17%	1%
Instituto MBO	7–10 Apr 2022	1.110	31.1%	19.1%	4.54%	4.18%	0.18%	24.18%	0.18%	0.09%	7.55% (Note: Josimar Maranhãozinho (PL) with 7.55%)	8.9%	6.92%
Escutec/Imirante	27 Mar–1 Apr 2022	2.000	22%	21%	10%	12%	1%	9%	2%	0%	5% (Note: Josimar Maranhãozinho (PL) with 5%)	18%	1%
31 March 2022	Roberto Rocha joins the Brazilian Labour Party.												
Pollster/client(s)	Date(s) conducted	Sample size	Weverton PDT	Brandão PSB	Rocha PSDB	Edivaldo PSD	Enilton PSOL	Lahésio PSC	Simplício Solidariedade	Hertz PSTU	Others	Abst. Undec.	Lead
Instituto Data M	26–30 Mar 2022	1.500	16.8%	15.8%	10.4%	8.5%	0.5%	13.9%	0.5%	0%	5.1% (Note: Josimar Maranhãozinho (PL) with 5.1%)	28.4%	1%
Instituto Data M	26–30 Mar 2022	1.500	17.7%	16.7%	12.1%	9%	–	14.2%	–	–	–	30.3%	1%
Instituto Data M	26–30 Mar 2022	1.500	19.6%	17.6%	–	10.9%	–	15.2%	–	–	–	36.7%	2%
Instituto Data M	26–30 Mar 2022	1.500	22.8%	20%	–	12.5%	–	–	–	–	–	44.7%	2.8%
Instituto MBO	20–24 Mar 2022	2.000	14%	22.25%	6.9%	4.3%	–	17.6%	0.6%	–	12.85% (Note: Josimar Maranhãozinho (PL) with 12.85%)	21.5%	2.5%
Pesquisa Exata	15–19 Mar 2022	1.400	22%	16%	13%	12%	1%	10%	2%	0%	6% (Note: Josimar Maranhãozinho (PL) with 6%.)	18%	3%
Pesquisa Exata	15–19 Mar 2022	1.400	25%	17%	14%	13%	–	11%	–	–	–	20%	8%
Pesquisa Exata	15–19 Mar 2022	1.400	31%	19%	–	15%	–	13%	–	–	–	22%	12%
Pesquisa Exata	15–19 Mar 2022	1.400	35%	22%	–	17%	–	–	–	–	–	26%	13%
Escutec/Imirante	17–22 Feb 2022	2.000	22%	19%	11%	12%	0%	6%	2%	–	5% (Note: Josimar Maranhãozinho (PL) with 5%)	23%	3%

=== Second round ===
The second round (if necessary) is scheduled to take place on 30 October 2022.

Brandão vs. Weverton

Pollster/client(s)	Date(s) conducted	Sample size	Weverton PDT	Brandão PSB	Abst. Undec.	Lead
Econométrica	11–15 Aug 2022	1.503	32.1%	48%	19.9%	15.9%
Pesquisa Exata	7–12 Aug 2022	1.469	42%	41%	17%	1%
Econométrica	19–22 Jul 2022	1.535	32.9%	42.1%	25%	9.2%
Pesquisa Exata	12–17 Jul 2022	1.475	42%	39%	19%	3%
Escutec/Imirante	2–7 Jul 2022	2.000	33%	34%	33%	1%
Escutec/Imirante	11–16 Jun 2022	2.000	34%	36%	30%	2%
Pesquisa Exata	5–9 Jun 2022	1.451	43%	37%	20%	6%
Escutec/Imirante	26–30 Apr 2022	2.000	34%	39%	27%	5%
Pesquisa Exata	25–29 Apr 2022	1.400	42%	35%	23%	7%

Brandão vs. Lahésio

Pollster/client(s)	Date(s) conducted	Sample size	Brandão PSB	Lahésio PSC	Abst. Undec.	Lead
Econométrica	11–15 Aug 2022	1.503	52.8%	29.5%	17.8%	23.3%
Pesquisa Exata	7–12 Aug 2022	1.469	51%	29%	20%	22%
Econométrica	19–22 Jul 2022	1.535	46.5%	31.1%	22.3%	15.4%
Pesquisa Exata	12–17 Jul 2022	1.475	48%	28%	24%	20%
Escutec/Imirante	2–7 Jul 2022	2.000	39%	27%	34%	12%
Escutec/Imirante	11–16 Jun 2022	2.000	38%	29%	33%	9%
Escutec/Imirante	26–30 Apr 2022	2.000	42%	25%	33%	17%
Pesquisa Exata	25–29 Apr 2022	1.400	46%	28%	26%	18%

Brandão vs. Edivaldo

Pollster/client(s)	Date(s) conducted	Sample size	Brandão PSB	Edivaldo PSD	Abst. Undec.	Lead
Pesquisa Exata	7–12 Aug 2022	1.469	53%	24%	23%	29%
Escutec/Imirante	2–7 Jul 2022	2.000	39%	22%	39%	17%
Escutec/Imirante	11–16 Jun 2022	2.000	39%	23%	38%	16%
Escutec/Imirante	26–30 Apr 2022	2.000	39%	23%	38%	16%
Pesquisa Exata	25–29 Apr 2022	1.400	49%	26%	25%	23%

Weverton vs. Edivaldo

Pollster/client(s)	Date(s) conducted	Sample size	Weverton PDT	Edivaldo PSD	Abst. Undec.	Lead
Pesquisa Exata	7–12 Aug 2022	1.469	58%	21%	21%	37%
Escutec/Imirante	11–16 Jun 2022	2.000	39%	20%	41%	19%
Escutec/Imirante	26–30 Apr 2022	2.000	35%	24%	41%	11%
Pesquisa Exata	25–29 Apr 2022	1.400	52%	23%	25%	29%

Brandão vs. Rocha

Pollster/client(s)	Date(s) conducted	Sample size	Brandão PSB	Rocha PTB	Abst. Undec.	Lead
Escutec/Imirante	26–30 Apr 2022	2.000	41%	26%	33%	15%
Pesquisa Exata	25–29 Apr 2022	1.400	47%	27%	26%	20%

Weverton vs. Josimar

Pollster/client(s)	Date(s) conducted	Sample size	Weverton PDT	Josimar PL	Abst. Undec.	Lead
Pesquisa Exata	25–29 Apr 2022	1.400	61%	10%	29%	50%

Weverton vs. Lahesio

Pollster/client(s)	Date(s) conducted	Sample size	Weverton PDT	Lahésio PSC	Abst. Undec.	Lead
Econométrica	11–15 Aug 2022	1.503	40.6%	33.3%	26.2%	7.3%
Pesquisa Exata	7–12 Aug 2022	1.469	55%	26%	19%	29%
Econométrica	19–22 Jul 2022	1.535	41.2%	30%	28.8%	11.2%
Pesquisa Exata	12–17 Jul 2022	1.475	51%	26%	23%	25%
Escutec/Imirante	11–16 Jun 2022	2.000	35%	28%	37%	7%
Escutec/Imirante	26–30 Apr 2022	2.000	37%	22%	41%	15%
Pesquisa Exata	25–29 Apr 2022	1.400	57%	17%	26%	40%

Weverton vs. Rocha

Pollster/client(s)	Date(s) conducted	Sample size	Weverton PDT	Rocha PTB	Abst. Undec.	Lead
Escutec/Imirante	26–30 Apr 2022	2.000	37%	26%	37%	11%

=== Senator ===
Pollster/client(s)	Date(s) conducted	Sample size	Dino PSB	Rocha PTB	Antônia PSOL	Arcangeli PSTU	Ivo DC	Others	Abst. Undec.	Lead
IPEC	20–23 Aug 2022	800	50%	21%	1%	2%	4%	–	23%	29%
Instituto MBO	12–16 Aug 2022	1.584	37%	22.48%	1.01%	0.94%	0.31%	–	38.26%	14.52%
Instituto MBO	12–16 Aug 2022	1.584	37.88%	24.69%	–	–	–	–	37.43%	13.19%
Econométrica	11–15 Aug 2022	1.503	52.4%	28.3%	0.9%	0.3%	0.8%	0.8% (Note: Ricardo Medeiros (DC) with 0.8%)	16.5%	24.1%
Pesquisa Exata	7–12 Aug 2022	1.469	54%	28%	2%	2%	3%	–	11%	26%
Pesquisa Exata	7–12 Aug 2022	1.469	55%	32%	–	–	–	–	13%	23%
21 July 2022	Pastor Bel withdrawns his candidacy to become the 2nd Alternate on Roberto Rocha's ticket.									
Pollster/client(s)	Date(s) conducted	Sample size	Dino PSB	Rocha PTB	Antônia PSOL	Arcangeli PSTU	Bel AGIR	Others	Abst. Undec.	Lead
Econométrica	19–22 Jul 2022	1.535	48.5%	27.9%	0.4%	1.1%	6.1%	–	15.9%	20.6%
Pesquisa Exata	12–17 Jul 2022	1.475	54%	24%	1%	1%	6%	2% (Note: Paulo Romão (PT) with 2%)	12%	30%
Escutec/Imirante	2–7 Jul 2022	2.000	47%	26%	2%	1%	2%	–	22%	21%
Real Time Big Data	20–21 Jun 2022	1.500	45%	27%	3%	0%	5%	–	20%	18%
Real Time Big Data	20–21 Jun 2022	1.500	49%	30%	–	–	–	–	21%	19%
Econométrica	12–16 Jun 2022	1.468	50%	26.8%	1%	0.5%	5.9%	–	15.8%	23.2%
Escutec/Imirante	11–16 Jun 2022	2.000	52%	27%	3%	–	–	–	18%	25%
Pesquisa Exata	5–9 Jun 2022	1.451	51%	26%	1%	1%	5%	2% (Note: Paulo Romão (PT) with 2%)	14%	25%
Escutec/Imirante	26–30 Apr 2022	2.000	55%	20%	1%	–	5%	–	19%	35%
Pesquisa Exata	25–29 Apr 2022	1.400	58%	22%	2%	2%	–	2% (Note: Paulo Romão (PT) with 2%)	14%	36%
Escutec/Imirante	27 Mar–1 Apr 2022	2.000	51%	22%	1%	–	3%	–	23%	29%
31 March 2022	Roberto Rocha joins the Brazilian Labour Party.									
Pollster/client(s)	Date(s) conducted	Sample size	Dino PSB	Rocha PSDB	Antônia PSOL	Arcangeli PSTU	Romão PT	Others	Abst. Undec.	Lead
Instituto Data M	26–30 Mar 2022	1.500	42.7%	21.3%	0.4%	0.4%	1.4%	8.5% (Note: Edivaldo Holanda Júnior (PSD) with 8.5%)	25.2%	21.4%
Pesquisa Exata	15–19 Mar 2022	1.400	51%	20%	1%	1%	1%	10% (Note: Edivaldo Holanda Júnior (PSD) with 10%)	16%	31%
Escutec/Imirante	17–22 Feb 2022	2.000	47%	23%	0%	–	–	9% (Note: Othelino Neto (PDT) with 9%)	21%	24%

== Results ==
=== Governor ===
Candidate	Running mate	Party	Votes	%
Carlos Brandão (incumbent)	Felipe Brandão (PT)	PSB	1,769,187	51.29
Lahesio Bonfim	Gutemberg Araújo	PSC)	857,744	24.87
Weverton Rocha	Hélio Soares (PL)	PDT	714,352	20.71
Edivaldo Holanda Júnior	Andrea Heringer	PSD	86,573	2.51
Enilton Rodrigues	Pedra Celestina	PSOL	7,135	0.21
Hertz Dias	Jayro Mesquita	PSTU	5,191	0.15
Simplício Araújo	Marly Tavares	Solidariedade	5,009	0.15
Joás Moraes	Ricardo Medeiros	DC	2,310	0.07
Frankle Costa	José Pereira Barbosa	PCB	1,889	0.05
Total			3,449,390	100.00
Valid votes			3,449,390	88.03
Invalid votes			348,048	8.88
Blank votes			120,774	3.08
Total votes			3,918,212	100.00
Registered voters/turnout			5,036,730	77.79
PSB hold				

Popular vote
Brandão	51.29%
Lahesio	24.87%
Weverton	20.71%
Others	3.14%

=== Senator ===
Candidate	Party	Votes	%
Flávio Dino	PSB	2,125,811	62.41
Roberto Rocha (incumbent)	PTB	1,211,174	35.56
Antônia Cariongo	PSOL	34,294	1.01
Ivo Nogueira	DC	24,875	0.73
Saulo Arcangeli	PSTU	10,206	0.30
Total		3,406,360	100.00
Valid votes		3,406,360	86.94
Invalid votes		310,469	7.92
Blank votes		201,383	5.14
Total votes		3,918,212	100.00
Registered voters/turnout		5,036,730	77.79
PSB gain from PTB			

Popular vote
Dino	62.41%
Rocha	35.56%
Others	2.04%

=== Chamber of Deputies ===
Party or alliance		Votes	%	Seats	+/–
Liberal Party		626,039	16.89	4	▲2
Brazil Union		374,204	10.10	2	New
Progressistas		304,434	8.21	2	▲1
Brazilian Democratic Movement		301,583	8.14	1	▼1
Brazilian Socialist Party		277,012	7.47	1	Steady
Social Christian Party		235,561	6.36	1	▲1
Patriota		231,636	6.25	1	Steady
Social Democratic Party		230,912	6.23	1	Steady
Brazil of Hope	Workers' Party	224,298	6.05	1	Steady
Brazil of Hope	Communist Party of Brazil	178,248	4.81	1	▼1
Brazil of Hope	Green Party	4,806	0.13	0	Steady
Podemos		222,975	6.02	1	Steady
Republicanos		189,824	5.12	1	Steady
Democratic Labour Party		183,387	4.95	1	Steady
Always Forward	Cidadania	63,066	1.70	0	Steady
Always Forward	Brazilian Social Democracy Party	3,449	0.09	0	Steady
Avante		8,162	0.22	0	Steady
Republican Party of the Social Order		8,069	0.22	0	Steady
Agir		7,531	0.20	0	Steady
New Party		6,755	0.18	0	Steady
PSOL REDE	Socialism and Liberty Party	5,817	0.16	0	Steady
PSOL REDE	Sustainability Network	1,593	0.04	0	Steady
Brazilian Labour Party		4,697	0.13	0	▼1
United Socialist Workers' Party		2,819	0.08	0	Steady
Christian Democracy		2,315	0.06	0	Steady
Solidariedade		2,197	0.06	0	Steady
Brazilian Labour Renewal Party		2,023	0.05	0	Steady
Brazilian Woman's Party		1,691	0.05	0	Steady
Brazilian Communist Party		1,182	0.03	0	Steady
Workers' Cause Party		213	0.01	0	Steady
Total		3,706,498	100.00	18	–
Valid votes		3,706,498	94.60		
Invalid votes		78,826	2.01		
Blank votes		132,888	3.39		
Total votes		3,918,212	100.00		
Registered voters/turnout		5,036,730	77.79		

=== Legislative Assembly ===
Party or alliance		Votes	%	Seats	+/–
Brazilian Socialist Party		861,799	23.35	11	▲9
Liberal Party		381,909	10.35	5	▲2
Progressistas		341,747	9.26	4	▲2
Democratic Labour Party		333,171	9.03	4	▼3
Brazil of Hope	Communist Party of Brazil	244,045	6.61	5	▼1
Brazil of Hope	Workers' Party	128,413	3.48	0	▼1
Brazil of Hope	Green Party	49,872	1.35	0	▼3
Patriota		232,583	6.30	3	▲3
Social Democratic Party		207,320	5.62	2	▲2
Brazilian Democratic Movement		202,326	5.48	2	Steady
Podemos		175,894	4.77	2	▲2
Social Christian Party		144,517	3.92	2	▲2
Republicanos		91,045	2.47	1	Steady
Brazil Union		72,612	1.97	1	New
Always Forward	Brazilian Social Democracy Party	57,346	1.55	0	▼1
Always Forward	Cidadania	8,203	0.22	0	Steady
Republican Party of the Social Order		54,123	1.47	0	▼1
Brazilian Labour Party		28,868	0.78	0	▼1
Agir		28,587	0.77	0	Steady
Brazilian Labour Renewal Party		25,476	0.69	0	▼2
PSOL REDE	Socialism and Liberty Party	7,798	0.21	0	Steady
PSOL REDE	Sustainability Network	1,400	0.04	0	Steady
Brazilian Woman's Party		5,516	0.15	0	Steady
United Socialist Workers' Party		3,185	0.09	0	Steady
Christian Democracy		3,104	0.08	0	Steady
Workers' Cause Party		117	0.00	0	Steady
Total		3,690,976	100.00	42	–
Valid votes		3,690,976	94.20		
Invalid votes		90,810	2.32		
Blank votes		136,366	3.48		
Total votes		3,918,152	100.00		
Registered voters/turnout		5,036,730	77.79		
