= Othelino Neto =

Brazilian politician (born 1975)

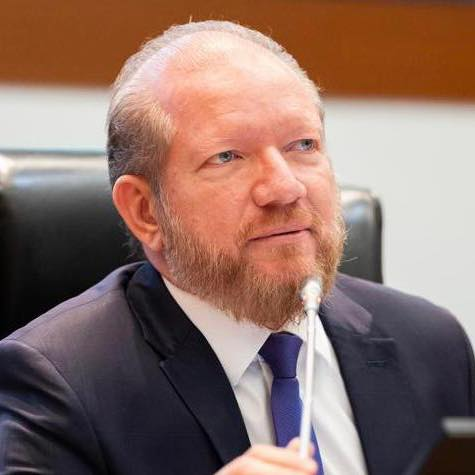

State deputy for Maranhão
- Incumbent
- Assumed office 4 January 2013

President of the Legislative Assembly of Maranhão
- In office 1 January 2018 – 1 February 2023
- Preceded by: Humberto Coutinho
- Succeeded by: Iracema Vale

Personal details
- Born: Othelino Nova Alves Neto; 7 July 1975 (age 51) São Luis, Maranhão, Brazil
- Party: PV (2003–2007); Cidadania (2007–2013); PCdoB (2013–present)
- Spouse: Ana Paula Lobato

Othelino Nova Alves Neto (born 7 July 1975) is a Brazilian politician who has been a state deputy in the state of Maranhão since 2013. From 2018 to 2023, he served as the president of the Legislative Assembly of Maranhão. He is currently affiliated with the Communist Party of Brazil (PCdoB).

He was the Secretary of the Environment of Maranhão from 2001 to 2005. He first ran for state deputy in 2010, being elected as a substitute deputy. He supported Jackson Lago in his run for governor and Dilma Rousseff for president. He assumed the mandate in 2013. He changed his affiliation from Cidadania to the Communist Party of Brazil in 2014, reaffirming his support for Dilma as president and supporting Flávio Dino in his run for governor.

Othelino became the president of the state legislative assembly after the death of the previous president Humberto Coutinho. He was re-elected state deputy with 60,386 votes (2.07%). In February 2022, he had openly contemplated changing affiliation again to the Democratic Labour Party to support their gubernatorial candidate that year, Weverton Rocha. He, however, rescinded his consideration and instead supported the winning candidate, PSB candidate Carlos Brandão. He was re-elected that year and in 2023 became the Secretary of Institutional Representation of Maranhão in Brasília.

His wife is Ana Paula Lobato, former vice-mayor of the city of Pinheiro and currently a federal senator from Maranhão.
