= Abigail Cunha =

Brazilian politician (born 1967)

Abigail Cunha de Almeida Sousa (born January 5, 1967, in São Francisco), is a state deputy affiliated with the Liberal Party (PL), elected by the state of Maranhão.

== Biography ==
Sousa began her political career within the Brazilian Social Democracy Party (PSDB) running for mayor of Jenipapo dos Vieira, Maranhão, for which she was not elected.

She later ran for State Deputy of Maranhão under the Liberal Party (PL) and was elected with 48,025 votes.

=== Electoral performance ===
Abigail's electoral performance
Year	Position	Party	Votes	Result	Ref.
2016	Mayor of Jenipapo dos Vieira	PSDB	4,472	Not elected	
2022	State Deputy of Maranhão	PL	48,025	Elected	

== Personal life ==
Abigail is married to politician Rigo Teles.
