= Idalete Rodrigues =

Brazilian politician

President of Socialist Youth of the PDT in Maranhão
- Incumbent
- Assumed office December 28, 2011

Personal details
- Born: Idalete Rodrigues dos Santos; November 9, 1984 (age 41) Pinheiro, MA
- Party: PDT (2009–present); PPS (2008); PCdoB (1996–2008)
- Profession: Politician

Idalete Rodrigues dos Santos, better known as Idalete Rodrigues (born November 9, 1984, in Pinheiro) is a Brazilian politician. She was vice-president of UEP (2002–2009) and councilor of CEJOVEM (2009–2011). Rodrigues is a president of Socialist Youth of the PDT in Maranhão since December 2011.
