= Josimar Maranhãozinho =

Brazilian politician (born 1976)

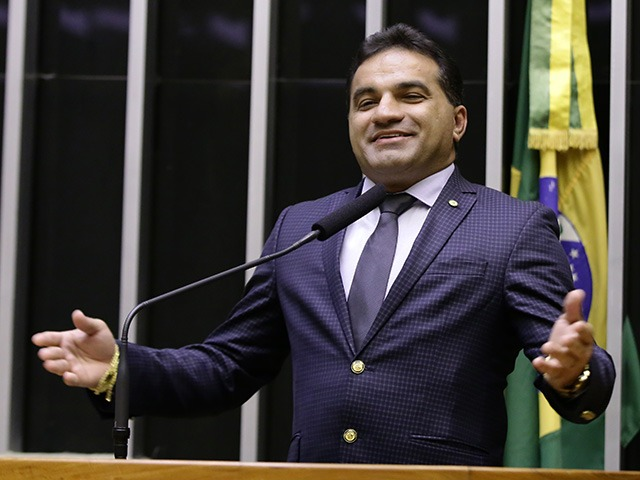
- Maranhãozinho in 2021

Member of the Chamber of Deputies
- Incumbent
- Assumed office 1 February 2019
- Constituency: Maranhão

Personal details
- Born: 13 November 1976 (age 49)
- Party: Liberal Party (since 2006)
- Spouse: Detinha
- Children: Josimar Júnior
- Relatives: Fabiana Vilar (niece)

Josimar Cunha Rodrigues, better known as Josimar Maranhãozinho (born 13 November 1976), is a Brazilian politician serving as a member of the Chamber of Deputies since 2019. From 2015 to 2019, he was a member of the Legislative Assembly of Maranhão. From 2005 to 2012, he served as mayor of Maranhãozinho. He is married to Detinha.
