= Weverton Rocha =

Brazilian politician (born 1979)

- Official portrait

Senator for Maranhão
- Incumbent
- Assumed office 1 February 2019

Federal Deputy for Maranhão
- In office 4 October 2011 – 31 January 2019

Personal details
- Born: Weverton Rocha Marques de Sousa; 8 October 1979 (age 47) Imperatriz, Maranhão, Brazil
- Party: PDT (1995–present)
- Spouse: Samya Bernardes
- Education: Faculdade São Luís

Weverton Rocha Marques de Sousa, more well known as simply Weverton (born 8 October 1979) is a Brazilian politician who is currently a senator from the state of Maranhão. He has been a long-time member of the Democratic Labour Party (PDT).

== Biography ==
He was the special assessor for the city of São Luís between 2000 and 2006. During the state elections in 2006, he had been committed to the victory of Jackson Lago, who won against Roseana Sarney. The win was considered a historic result as Lago was the first candidate to win that was not connected to Roseana or her father, former president José Sarney, in several decades. He was the State Secretary of Sport and Youth of Maranhão in 2007.

In 2009, when Jackson Lago was removed from office by the Brazilian Superior Electoral Court and the Supreme Federal Court decided to instate election runner-up Roseana Sarney, Weverton remained on Jackson's side at the Palácio dos Leões, the seat of government, until the final decision about his mandate in a move of resistance that referred to itself as Balaiada, a reference to a people's revolt in the 19th century against the monopoly of landowners. He also updated to the Ministry of Labor and Employment, in 2009, and invited by the national president of the PDT, Carlos Lupi, to integrate his team as a special assessor. Weverton is a member of the national executive council of the PDT and presides over its state party in Maranhão.

In 2010, he became a candidate for federal deputy and obtained 47,130 votes, becoming a substitute for the PDT. He was nominated to be secretary-general of the PDT, but returned to be a special assessor. In 2011, he assumed office in the federal chamber as a substitute, and after the election of Edivaldo Holanda Júnior as mayor of São Luís in 2012, he began serving as federal deputy. He was reelected in 2014 with more than 81,000 votes.

In January 2016, he was elected the PDT's leader in the Chamber of Deputies and was reappointed leader in 2017. As leader, in April 2016, he voted against the commencement of impeachment hearings against Dilma Rousseff. He also was against the approval of the Constitutional Amendment of the Public Expenditure Cap.

Weverton was, during this time period, the minority leader in the chamber, at that time made up of the PDT, PSB, PT, PCdoB and PSOL. He positioned himself as being against the 2017 labor reforms put forth by the Temer government, due to the pro-labor stances of the PDT. Weverton had been the author of 283 propositions during his time in the Chamber of Deputies.

Weverton introduced various amendments to social security reforms, among them to maintain the current rules for retirement for rural laborers and their families, which would stipulate to have proven 15 years of effective individual contributions in taxes. This is compared to the rules at the time that stipulated 15 collective years of field work. His proposals also would have maintained the reduced retirement time for teachers. In June 2018, he voted against government reforms to liberalize gun laws to more freely allow the carrying and possession of firearms in Brazil.

In 2018, he was elected a federal senator from Maranhão with 34.91% of the vote, amounting to 1,997,443 votes. He received the largest number of votes for senator in the history of Maranhão up to that point. He was a candidate for the gubernatorial race in Maranhão during the 2022 general elections obtaining 714,352 votes (or 20.71% of the votes), landing in third place behind eventual winner Carlos Brandão and Lahesio Bonfim.

== Controversies ==
=== Changes to anti-corruption project ===
Weverton had introduced the main emphasis to the projects surrounding the law that outlined the 10 measures against corruption, which added that magistrates and members of the Public Ministry respond to crimes of abuse of authority when they acted with conduct incompatible to their position. This emphasis, the most controversial of all changes made, and was considered by some an attempt to intimidate the prosecutors of Operation Car Wash, was approved with 313 votes in favor, 132 against the measure, and 5 that were absent. He affirmed that judges and promoters that commit arbitrary and illegal actions would receive as punishment reductions in their pensions to a pension comparable to those with median salaries.

=== Investigations ===
Weverton has been investigated for embezzlement and corruption, for his supposed involvement with the funneling of funds from the Labor ministry by way of irregular contracting with NGOs. He was also accused of allegedly committing crimes against government procurement agencies when he had been the state Sports Secretary in Maranhão, as he had allegedly favored one company for renovations made to a gymnasium, and had been given funds in an unduly fashion. In an interview to the local press, meanwhile, the person that succeeded him as secretary had declared that the decision to eventually stop the project was political in nature.

==== Administrative impropriety ====
He is also being investigated in three separate lawsuits for administrative impropriety, made by prosecutors at the federal level and in Maranhão, one in which he had supposedly been the beneficiary of the usage of private jets paid for by public entities in the Labor Ministry during the time in which he was secretary. He was not named a defendant in any of these suits because the judicial process had not started.

=== Influence on local media ===
Since March 2016, Weverton has leased out the Sistema Difusora de Comunicação conglomerate, specifically Rede Difusora, Difusora FM, and the website MA10. He has nominated journalist and publisher Zeca Pinheiro to his administrative board. He has used the media platforms he has leased out to as a venue to showcase his actions during his time as federal deputy, as well as to the benefit of politicians he has aligned himself with, such as former São Luís mayor Edivaldo Holanda Júnior. The financial transactions referring to the leasing out of these companies, as well as a possible selling of the conglomerate, have been intermediated by businessman Willer Tomaz de Souza, who had been imprisoned due to being implicated in Operation Car Wash on 18 May 2017. Weverton had also acquired, in April 2018, the Sinal Verde System of Communication, based in Caxias, that also includes TV Sinal Verde and Sinal Verde FM. The number of companies leased in whole or in part out by public office holders are prohibited by the Brazilian Code of Telecommunications and by the Brazilian Constitution.
