= 2014 Maranhão gubernatorial election =

Brazilian election

- October 5, 2014
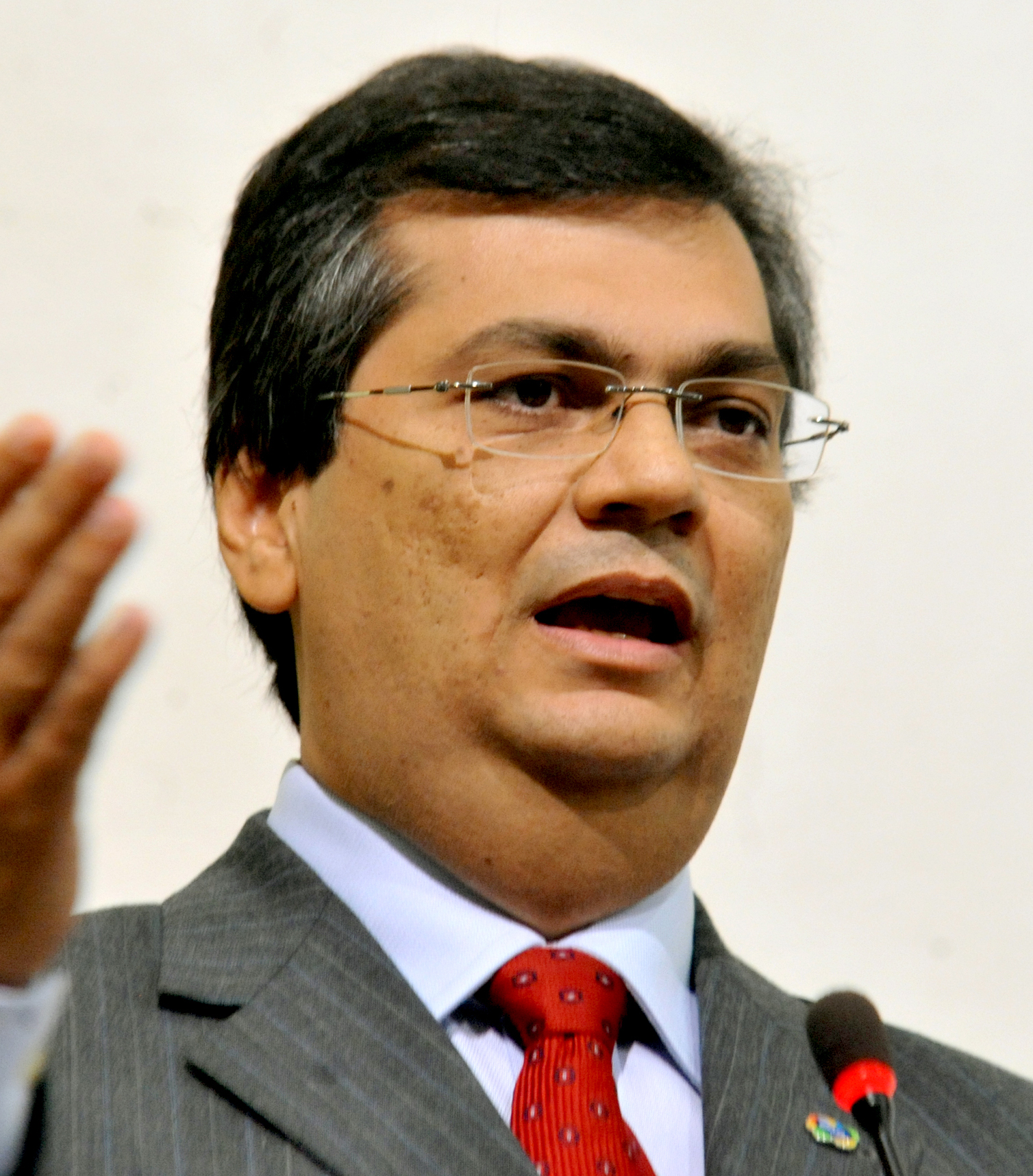

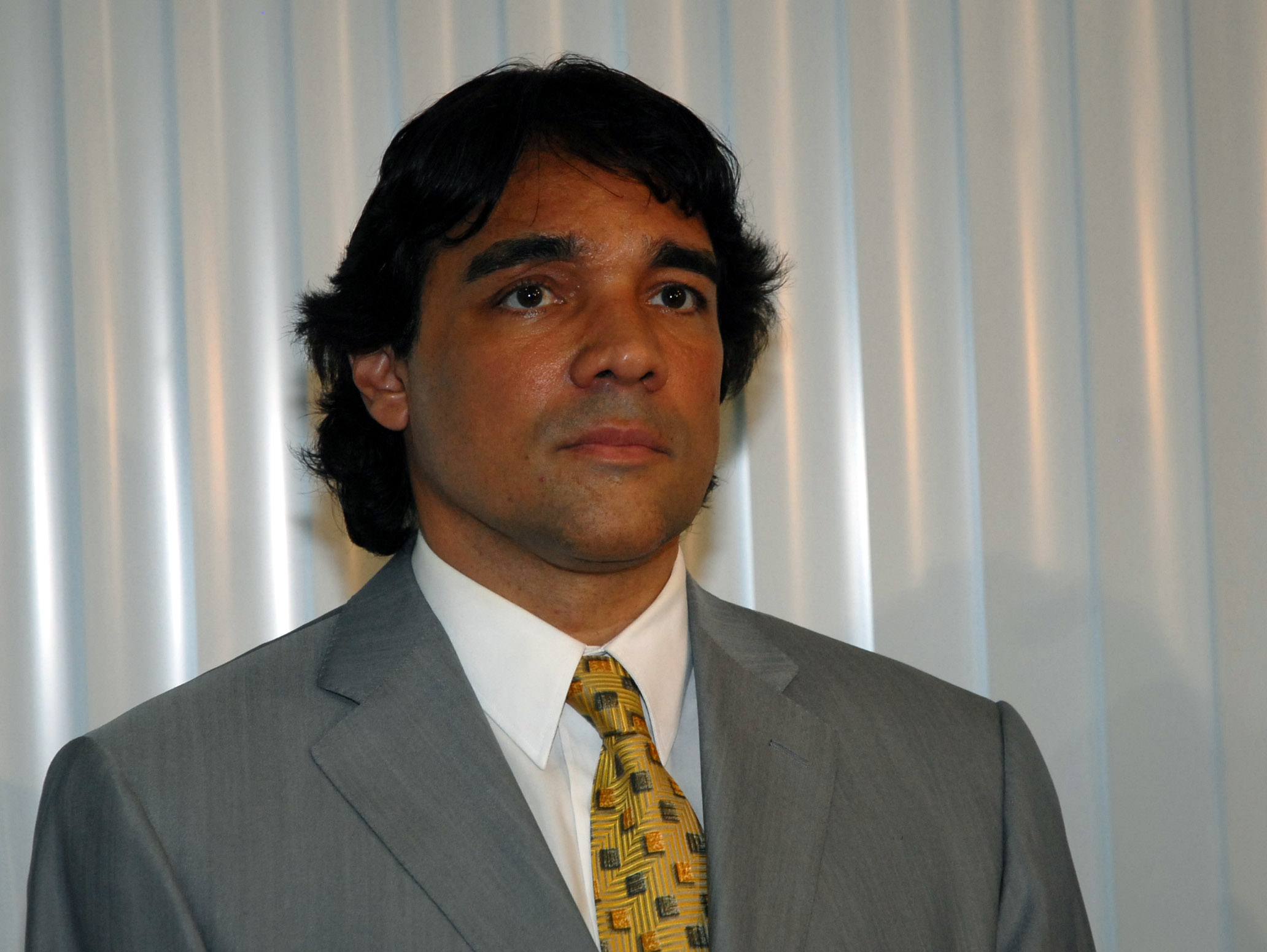
Nominee	Flávio Dino	Lobão Filho
Party	PCdoB	MDB
Running mate	Brandão	Melo
Popular vote	1.877.064	995.619
Percentage	63,52%	33,69%
Governor before election
Roseana Sarney
MDB
Elected Governor
Flávio Dino
PCdoB

The Maranhão gubernatorial election was held on 5 October 2014 to elect the next governor of the state of Maranhão in Brazil. If no candidate had received more than 50% of the vote, a second-round runoff election would have been held on 26 October. Governor Roseana was ineligible to run due to term limits. Former Embratur President Dino, who lost to Sarney in 2010, won a landslide election against Senator Lobão Filho to become the sole Governor from one of the two Communist parties.

== Candidates ==
Candidate	Running mate	Coalition
Lobão Filho; PMDB	Arnaldo Melo; PMDB	"Forward Maranhão" (PMDB, PT, DEM, PEN, PHS, PMN, PR, PRB, PRP, PRTB, PSC, PSD, PSDC, PSL, PTB, PTdoB, PTN, PV)
Saulo Arcangeli; PSTU	Ana Paula Martins; PSTU	-
Prof. Josivaldo; PCB	Francinaldo Leite; PCB	-
Pedrosa; PSOL	Prof. Odivio Neto; PSOL	-
Zeluis Lago; PPL	Jansen; PPL	-
Flávio Dino; PCdoB	Carlos Brandão; PSDB	"All By Maranhão" (PCdoB, PSDB, PSB, PPS, PP, SDD, PDT, PTC, PROS)

== Opinion Polling ==
Date	Institute	Candidate						Blank/Null/Undecided
Date	Institute	Flávio Dino (PCdoB)	Lobão Filho (PMDB)	Pedrosa (PSOL)	Saulo Arcângeli (PSTU)	Zeluis Lago (PPL)	Josivaldo Correa (PCB)	Blank/Null/Undecided
September 17–19, 2014	Vox Populi	48%	27%	-	-	-	-	24%

== Results ==
Maranhão Gubernatorial Election
Party	Candidate	Votes	%	±%
PCdoB	Flávio Dino	1,877,064	63.52%	
MDB	Lobão Filho	995,619	33.69%	
PSOL	Pedrosa	33,749	1.14%	
PSTU	Saulo Arcangeli	27,304	0.92%	
PPL	Zeluis Lago	17,650	0.60%	
PCB	Prof. Josivaldo	3,574	0.12%	
Majority		881,445	29.83%	
PCdoB hold		Swing		
