= Josimar Júnior =

Brazilian politician (born 2003)

Member of the Legislative Assembly of Maranhão
- Incumbent
- Assumed office 1 February 2027

Personal details
- Born: 24 February 2003 (age 23)
- Party: Liberal Party (since 2026)
- Parents: Josimar Maranhãozinho (father); Detinha (mother)

Josimar Cunha Rodrigues Júnior (born 24 February 2003), better known as Josimar Júnior, is a Brazilian politician who was elected member of the Legislative Assembly of Maranhão in 2026. He is the son of Josimar Maranhãozinho and Detinha.
