= Detinha =

Brazilian politician (born 1979)

Member of the Chamber of Deputies
- Incumbent
- Assumed office 1 February 2023
- Constituency: Maranhão

Personal details
- Born: 25 January 1979 (age 47)
- Party: Liberal Party (since 2007)
- Spouse: Josimar Maranhãozinho
- Children: Josimar Júnior

Maria Deusdete Lima Cunha Rodrigues (born 25 January 1979), better known as Detinha, is a Brazilian politician serving as a member of the Chamber of Deputies since 2023. From 2019 to 2022, she was a member of the Legislative Assembly of Maranhão. From 2009 to 2016, she served as mayor of Centro do Guilherme. She is married to Josimar Maranhãozinho.
