= Ana Paula Lobato =

Brazilian nurse and politician (born 1984)

- Official portrait

Senator for Maranhão
- Incumbent
- Assumed office 21 February 2024
- Preceded by: Flávio Dino
- In office 2 February 2023 – 1 February 2024
- Preceded by: Flávio Dino
- Succeeded by: Flávio Dino

Vice Mayor of Pinheiro
- In office 1 January 2021 – 1 February 2023
- Mayor: Luciano Genésio
- Preceded by: Prof. Stelio
- Succeeded by: Office vacant

Personal details
- Born: Ana Paula Dias Lobato; 11 May 1984 (age 42) Pinheiro, Maranhão, Brazil
- Party: PDT (2024–present)
- Other political affiliations: PPS (2011–2016); PDT (2016–2022); PSB (2022–2024)
- Spouse: Othelino Neto

Ana Paula Dias Lobato Nova Alves (born 11 May 1984) is a Brazilian nurse and politician who has been a senator from the state of Maranhão since 2023. She assumed the position after the elected senator, Flávio Dino, became the Minister of Justice and Public Security during the second Lula presidency, and became the titular senator once he was nominated for the Supreme Federal Court. She had previously been the vice-mayor for the city of Pinheiro. She is currently affiliated with the Democratic Labour Party (PDT). As of 2024, she is the youngest senator in the Brazilian federal senate.

She was a candidate for federal deputy in 2014, and as vice-mayor for Pinheiro in 2016, but was not elected to either position. She was elected vice-mayor in 2021, with Luciano Genésio as mayor. She briefly served as mayor after Genésio had been removed by court order.

Lobato's husband is Othelino Neto, who is a state deputy in Maranhão and who was ex-president of the Legislative Assembly of Maranhão.
