= TV Pinheiro =

- Pinheiro, Maranhão; Brazil
- Channels: Analog: 11 VHF; Digital: 16 UHF (in deployment)

Programming
- Affiliations: Rede Bandeirantes

Ownership
- Owner: Vanderley Mineiro

History
- Founded: 1998
- Former affiliations: Rede Record (1998-2003)

Technical information
- Licensing authority: ANATEL

TV Pinheiro is a Brazilian television station based in Pinheiro, Maranhão. It operates on channel 11 (VHF analog) and is in the process of deploying its digital signal of channel 16 UHF. It is an affiliate of Rede Bandeirantes.

== History ==
TV Pinheiro was inaugurated in 1998 and was initially affiliated with Rede Record. On June 27, 2003, the station leaves Record and becomes an affiliate of Bandeirantes. Afterwards, Rede Record has been broadcasting in Pinheiro by TV Pericumã.

In 2013, the control of channel 11 is the subject of dispute between co-religionists Zé Arlindo (former mayor of Pinheiro) and Luciano Genesio (Member of Parliament). A station owned by Arlindo's group even operated on the channel at the same time as TV Pinheiro, so that the signals interfered with each other. The former mayor's station was removed from the air by Anatel in conjunction with the Federal Police of Brazil on July 22, 2013, since only TV Pinheiro had authorization to operate.

On March 15, 2016, under the administration of Luciano Genésio, TV Pinheiro has its electricity supply cut off by Equatorial Energia Maranhão. This is due to the lack of payment of the electricity bill, with the total price being 6,000 Reais.
