= Sálvio Dino =

Brazilian politician (1932–2020)

City councilor of São Luís
- In office 1955–1962

Member of the Legislative Assembly of Maranhão
- In office 1963–1964
- In office 1975–1979

Mayor of João Lisboa
- In office 1989–1993
- Succeeded by: Raimundo Cabeludo
- In office 1997–2000
- Preceded by: Raimundo Cabeludo
- Succeeded by: Francisco Holanda

Personal details
- Born: 5 June 1932 Grajaú, Maranhão, Brazil
- Died: 24 August 2020 (aged 88) São Luís, Maranhão, Brazil
- Party: Democrats (PFL)
- Other political affiliations: ARENA (former); PP (former)
- Children: Flávio Dino
- Education: Faculdade de Direito do Maranhão
- Profession: Politician, Lawyer

Sálvio Dino (5 June 1932 – 24 August 2020) was a Brazilian writer and politician who served as a Congressman.

He died from complications of COVID-19 during the COVID-19 pandemic in Brazil.
