= Iracema Vale =

Brazilian politician (born 1968)

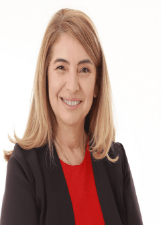
- Vale in 2022

Member-elect of the Chamber of Deputies
- Assuming office 1 February 2027
- Constituency: Maranhão

Member of the Legislative Assembly of Maranhão
- Incumbent
- Assumed office 1 February 2023
- Constituency: At-large

President of the Legislative Assembly of Maranhão
- Incumbent
- Assumed office 2 February 2023
- Preceded by: Othelino Neto

Mayor of Urbano Santos
- In office 1 January 2013 – 1 January 2021
- Vice Mayor: Miguel Fernandes (2013–2016); Darcy Almeida (2017–2020)
- Preceded by: Abnadab Silveira
- Succeeded by: Clemilton Almeida

Personal details
- Born: Iracema Cristina Vale Lima; 18 June 1968 (age 58) São Luís, Maranhão, Brazil
- Party: MDB (since 2026)
- Other political affiliations: PSD (1998–2003); PTB (2003–2007); PSB (2007–2011, 2022–2026); PT (2011–2022)

Iracema Cristina Vale Lima (born 18 June 1968) is a Brazilian politician serving as president of the Legislative Assembly of Maranhão since 2023. From 2013 to 2020, she served as mayor of Urbano Santos.

Political offices
Preceded by Abnadab Silveira	Mayor of Urbano Santos; 2013–2017	Succeeded by Clemilton Almeida
Preceded by Othelino Neto	President of the Legislative Assembly of Maranhão; 2023–present	Incumbent
