= Humberto Coutinho =

Brazilian politician and physician (1946–2018)

President of the Legislative Assembly of Maranhão
- In office February 1, 2015 – January 1, 2018
- Preceded by: Max Barros
- Succeeded by: Othelino Neto

Member of the Legislative Assembly of Maranhão
- In office February 1, 2015 – January 31, 2019

Mayor of Caxias
- In office January 1, 2005 – January 1, 2013
- Preceded by: Márcia Serejo Marinho
- Succeeded by: Léo Coutinho

Member of the Legislative Assembly of Maranhão
- In office February 1, 1991 – December 17, 2004

Personal details
- Born: July 21, 1946 Pedreiras, Maranhão, Brazil
- Died: February 1, 2018 (aged 71) Caxias, Maranhão, Brazil
- Party: Democratic Labour Party (2007–2018) PTB(2003–2007); PSD (2001–2003); PFL (1985–2001) PDS (1980–1985)
- Occupation: Physician; Politician

Humberto Ivar Araújo Coutinho (August 21, 1946 – January 1, 2018) was a Brazilian physician and politician. Coutinho served as the President of the Legislative Assembly of Maranhão from 2015 until his death in office on January 1, 2018.

Coutinho, a doctor by profession, began his political career as an elected Caxias city councilor in 1988. He was elected to the Legislative Assembly of Maranhão five times: 1990, 1994, 1998 and 2002. He was elected Mayor of Caxias in 2004 and won re-election in 2008. Coutinho was once again elected to the state Legislative Assembly in 2014. He served as the President of the Legislative Assembly of Maranhão from 2015 until his death on January 1, 2018.

Coutinho died in Caxias on January 1, 2018, at the age of 71 following a four-year battle with intestinal cancer. The Maranhão state government declared three days of official mourning.

Othelino Neto became the interim President of the Legislative Assembly of Maranhão following Coutinho's death.
