= Nicolao Dino =

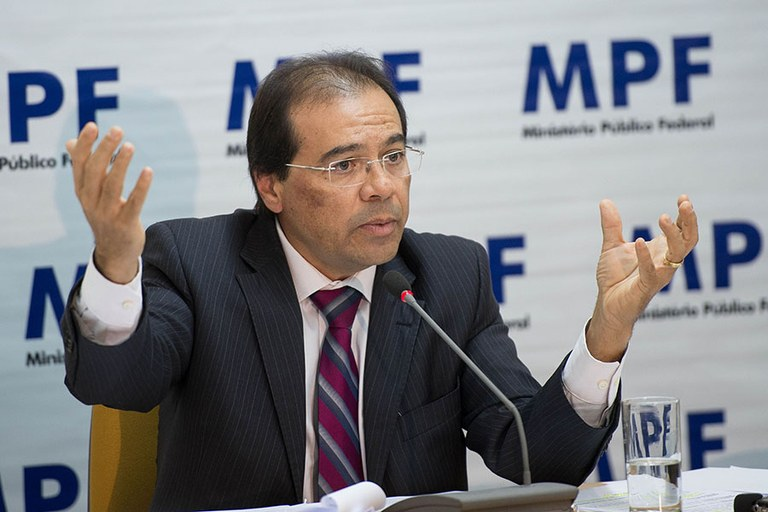
- Nicolao Dino in 2017

Deputy Prosecutor General for Electoral Matters
- In office 5 April 2016 – 17 September 2017
- Appointed by: Ela Wiecko
- Preceded by: Eugênio Aragão
- Succeeded by: Humberto Jacques de Medeiros

Personal details
- Born: Nicolao Dino de Castro e Costa Neto; 25 August 1963 (age 63) São Luís, Brazil
- Parent: Sálvio Dino (father)
- Relatives: Flávio Dino (brother)
- Education: Federal University of Maranhão (LL.B.); Federal University of Pernambuco (LL.M)
- Profession: Federal Prosecutor, Attorney

Nicolao Dino de Castro e Costa Neto (born in São Luís on 25 August 1963) is a Brazilian jurist. A member of the Federal Public Prosecutor's Office since 1991, he is a Subprosecutor General of the Republic and previously served as Deputy Prosecutor General for Electoral Matters. In this role, he worked alongside Rodrigo Janot in cases before the Superior Electoral Court, such as the petitions seeking the annulment of the Rousseff–Temer ticket.

He is an assistant professor at the Faculty of Law of the University of Brasília.
