= Fabiana Vilar =

Brazilian politician (born 1986)

Member-elect of the Chamber of Deputies
- Assuming office 1 February 2027
- Constituency: Maranhão

Member of the Legislative Assembly of Maranhão
- Incumbent
- Assumed office 1 February 2023
- Constituency: At-large

Personal details
- Born: Fabiana Vilar Rodrigues; 18 September 1986 (age 40) Várzea Alegre, Ceará, Brazil
- Party: PL (since 2020)
- Relatives: Josimar Maranhãozinho (uncle)

Fabiana Vilar Rodrigues (born 18 September 1986) is a Brazilian politician serving as a member of the Legislative Assembly of Maranhão since 2023. From 2019 to 2020, she served as secretary of agriculture, livestock and fisheries of Maranhão. She is the niece of Josimar Maranhãozinho.
