= Rousseff–Temer ticket annulment trial =

Court case in Brazil, decided in 2017

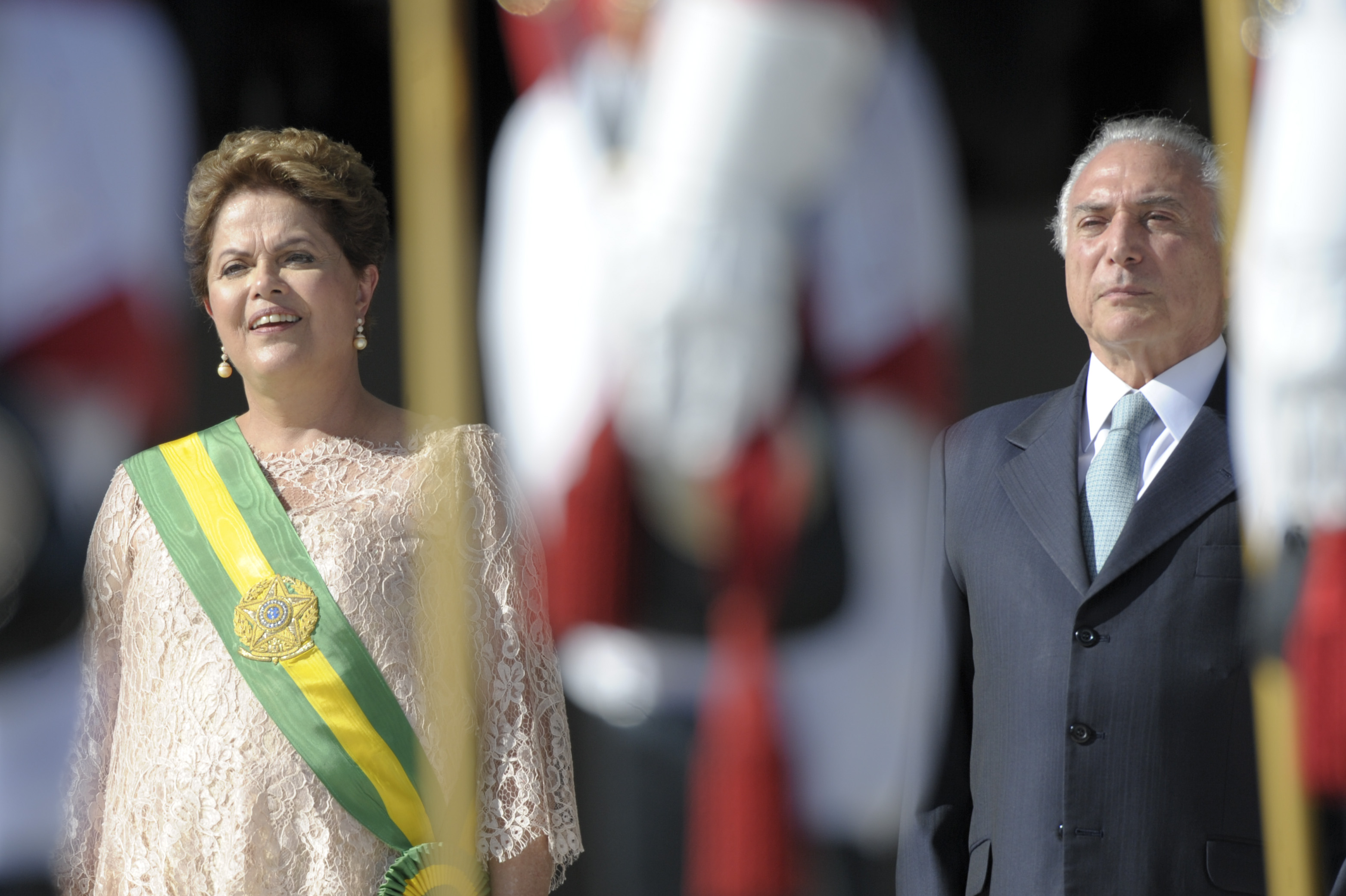
- Dilma Rousseff and Michel Temer during the inauguration of their second term in January 2015
- Court: Superior Electoral Court
- Full case name: Ação de Investigação Judicial Eleitoral nº 194358
- Decided: 9 June 2017

Court membership
- Judges sitting: President: Gilmar Mendes; Justices: Luiz Fux; Rosa Weber; Napoleão Maia; Admar Gonzaga; Tarcisio Vieira; Herman Benjamin (rapporteur)

Case opinions
- Decision by: Benjamin
- Concurrence: Fux, Weber
- Dissent: Maia, Gonzaga, Vieira, Mendes

Keywords
- Abuse of power

The Rousseff–Temer ticket annulment trial was a case filed by the Brazilian Social Democracy Party (PSDB) in 2014 before the Superior Electoral Court, in which the petitioner sought the annulment of the winning ticket of the 2014 presidential election, headed by Dilma Rousseff and Michel Temer, over alleged irregularities and abuse of political and economic power in the electoral campaign. It was the first time the Court examined a request that could lead to the removal of a sitting president from office.

The final opinion was issued by the Deputy Prosecutor General for Electoral Matters, Nicolao Dino, in April 2017, and stated that the Rousseff–Temer campaign had received 112 million reais in irregular funds (approximately US$45 million at the October 2014 exchange rate).

By the time of the trial, Dilma Rousseff had already been removed from the presidency through an impeachment process, meaning that the impact of a potential conviction and removal would fall on then-president Michel Temer, who was already facing other criminal allegations.

The trial at the Superior Electoral Court took place between 6 and 9 June 2017 and resulted in the acquittal of the ticket by a vote of 4–3. The rapporteur, Justice Herman Benjamin, voted in favor of annulment and was joined by Justices Luiz Fux and Rosa Weber. Voting for acquittal were Justices Napoleão Nunes Maia Filho, Admar Gonzaga, Tarcisio Vieira de Carvalho Neto, and the then president of the court, Justice Gilmar Mendes, who cast the decisive vote.
