= Fábio Macedo =

Brazilian politician (born 1981)

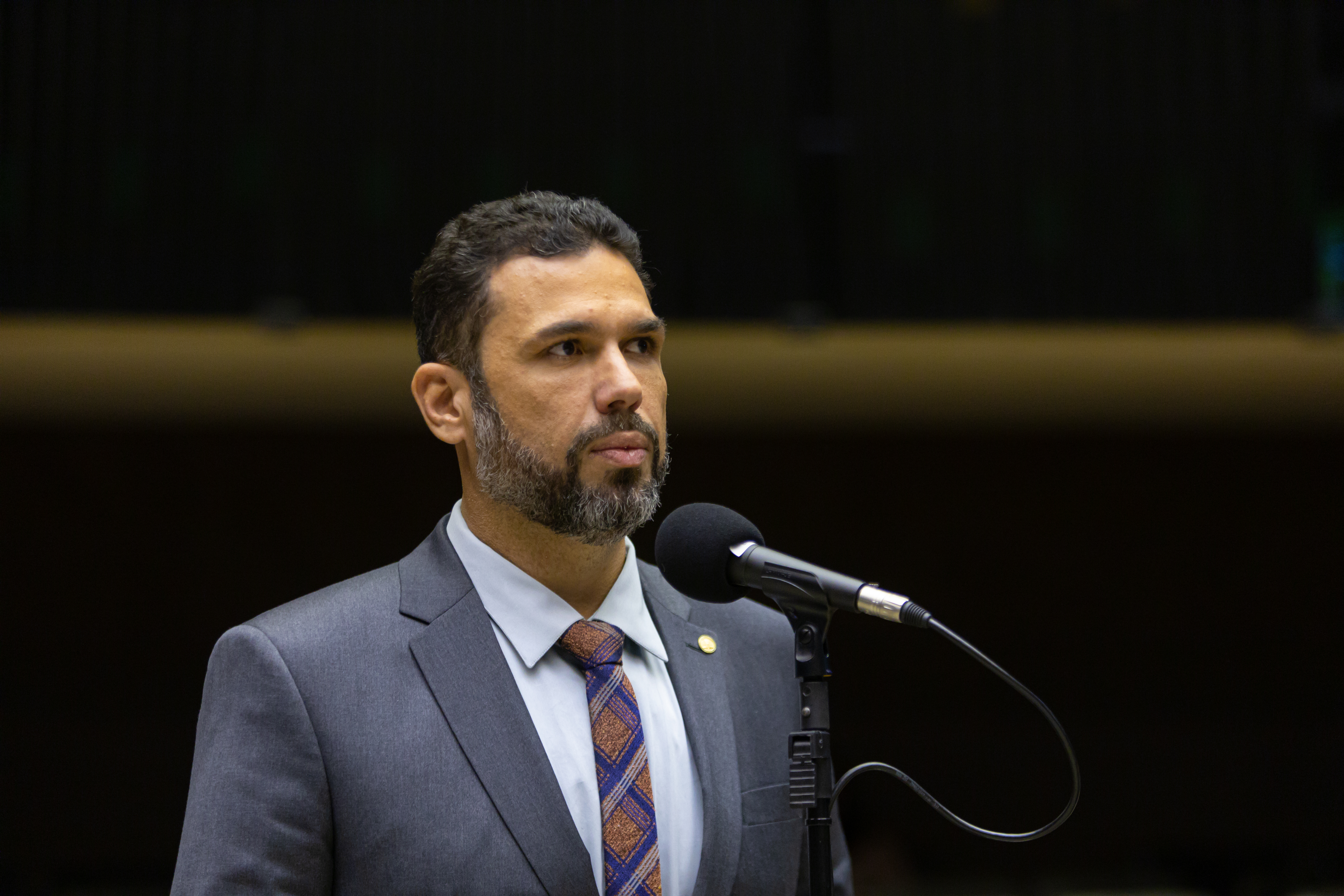
- Macedo in 2023

Member of the Chamber of Deputies
- Incumbent
- Assumed office 1 February 2023
- Constituency: Maranhão

Personal details
- Born: 18 September 1981 (age 44)
- Party: Podemos (since 2022)

Fábio Henrique Dias de Macedo (born 18 September 1981) is a Brazilian politician serving as a member of the Chamber of Deputies since 2023. From 2015 to 2023, he was a member of the Legislative Assembly of Maranhão.
