= Edison Lobão Filho =

Brazilian politician

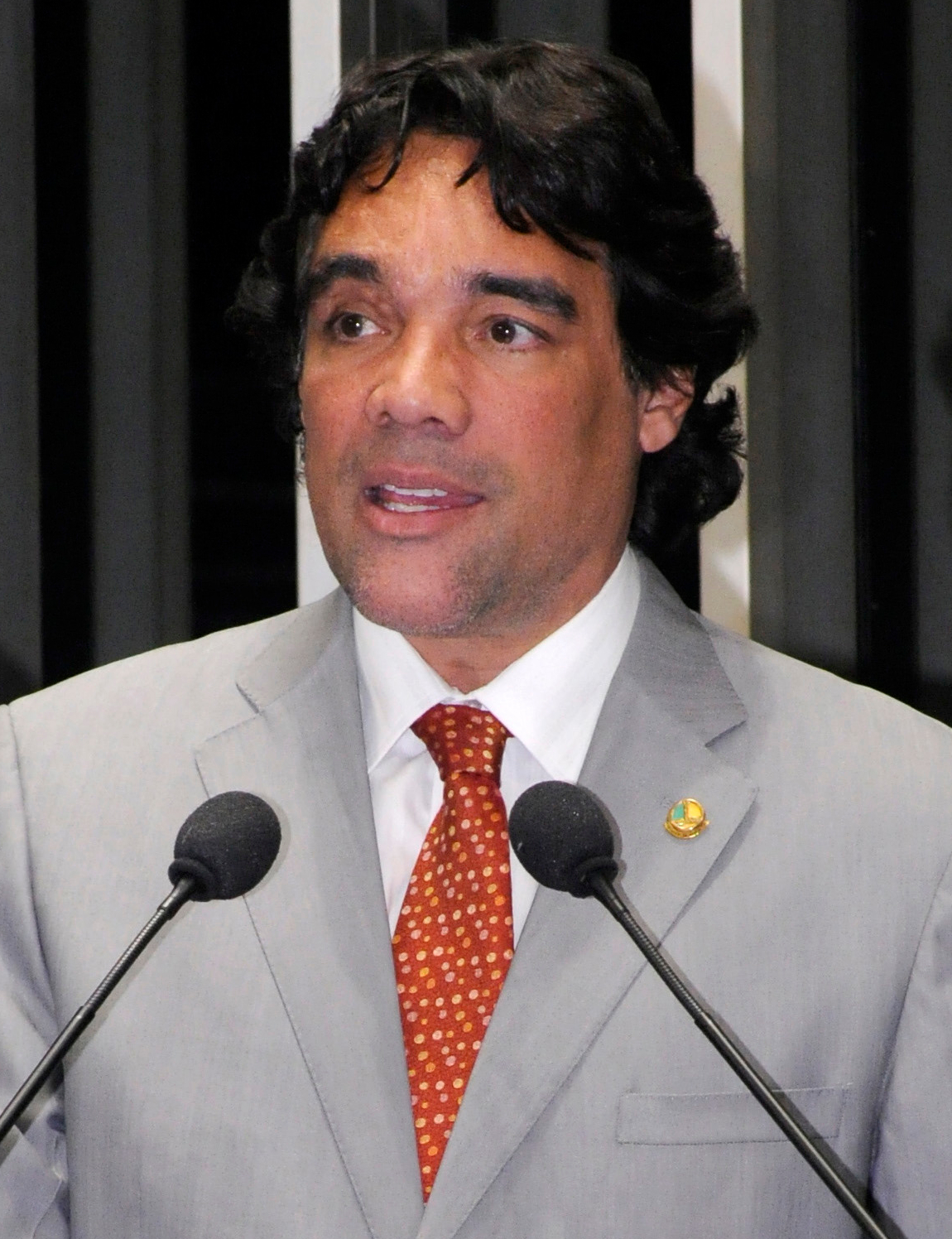

Senator from Maranhão
- In office January 18, 2008 – January 1, 2015

Personal details
- Born: September 17, 1964 (age 61) Brasília, DF, Brazil
- Party: PDS (1980—1985); PFL (1985—2008); DEM (2007—2008); PMDB (2008—current)
- Spouse: Paulinha Lobão (1985—current)
- Children: Tatiana Lobão (1987), Lucas Lobão (1989)
- Profession: Businessman, politician

Edison Lobão Filho (born September 17, 1964) is a Brazilian politician and businessman. He represented Maranhão in the Federal Senate from 2011 to 2015. He is a member of the PMDB.

Graduated in Civil Engineering from the University of Brasilia and Economics from UniCEUB, he is the son and first substitute of Senator Edison Lobão and Federal Representative Nice Lobão. He assumed the vacancy in the Federal Senate temporarily from January 30, 2008, after his father was licensed to take over the Ministry of Mines and Energy. With the return of Lobão to the Ministry in 2011, Lobão Filho reassumes the mandate. 'Edinho', as it is also known, is one of the owners of the Communication Diffusion System, an affiliate of SBT in the state of Maranhão.

== Polemics ==
=== Loan at Banco do Nordeste ===
Since 2002, Banco do Nordeste has attempted to pledge the assets of Lobão Filho, as it has been guarantor of a loan made and not paid with the financial institution. The loan would have been made in 1997 by Bemar Distribuidora de Bebidas in which it was to be paid in thirty installments. Besides Lobão, his wife Paula and the members of the Maranhão distributor, Maria Luiza Thiago de Almeida and Ana Maria dos Santos, appear as guarantors. The Maranhão beverage company did not pay the debt and since then the bank has tried to pawn the goods of the then senator and other guarantors. At the beginning of the action, the debt was R $5.5 million. It would have been offered as guarantee for the payment of the debt, a farm of 20 thousand hectares in Sento Sé, in Bahia, evaluated, according to the company, in R $4.5 million. Banco do Nordeste found that the property that the beverage distributor offered as collateral for the payment did not exist and at the same time the company tried to exclude Lobão and the other ex-partners from the condition of guarantors. In 2009, the lawsuit against those involved was filed without justification. After the acknowledgment of the error, the financial institution requested that the case be unleashed, but since August 2011, despite the conclusion of the lawsuit, it remained filed until January 2013. The judge responsible for the suit, José de Arimatéia Correia Silva, 5th Civil Court of São Luís, was involuntarily retired by the [National Council of Justice], for having been accused of acting with unfair preference in several actions.

=== Clandestine broadcaster and hidden company in beverage distributor ===
Soon after taking office as a substitute senator in his father's place, in January 2008, Lobão Filho responded to the lawsuit for having maintained a clandestine TV station in the Maranhão countryside in the year 1999. In 2008, Edinho was also appointed As a participatory hidden partner in the Maranhão beverage distributor Itumar, and to withhold R $42 million between 2000 and 2008.

=== Election for Governor of Maranhão ===
==== Purchase of evidence against opponent ====
Amid the race for the governorship of Maranhão in 2014, Edison Lobão Filho in an interview on a program of Radio Mirante, would have offered R $28,000 for those who could denounce and present evidence that incriminated his main opponent in the election Flávio Dino (PCdoB) Of crimes such as administrative misconduct, corruption and theft during his term as president of Embratur, according to him, low-slang words were used during the interview by the then pre-candidate comparing even his family to that of his competitor. The accused chose not to respond to the comments, however, the president of the Communist Party of Brazil (PCdoB) in the state, Márcio Jerry stated: "The Maranhans expect a clean campaign, with debates and not with lies and aggressions. For Maranhão, a wealthy state but impoverished by bad politics. "
