= Lahesio Bonfim =

Brazilian politician (born 1978)

- Bonfim in 2026

Senator-elect for Maranhão
- Assuming office 1 February 2027

Mayor of São Pedro dos Crentes
- In office 1 January 2017 – 1 April 2022
- Vice Mayor: Rômulo Arruda
- Preceded by: Luiza Coutinho Macedo
- Succeeded by: Rômulo Arruda

Personal details
- Born: Lahesio Rodrigues do Bonfim; 30 July 1978 (age 48) Marcos Parente, Piauí, Brazil
- Party: NOVO (since 2023)
- Other political affiliations: PT (2003–2007); PDT (2007–2011); PSB (2011–2016); PSDB (2016–2019); PSL (2019–2021); PTB (2021–2022); Agir (2022); PSC (2022–2023)
- Profession: Physician

Lahesio Rodrigues do Bonfim (born 30 July 1978) is a Brazilian politician who was elected member of the Senate in 2026. From 2017 to 2022, he served as mayor of São Pedro dos Crentes.
