= Alliance for Brazil =

Brazilian political group

Alliance for Brazil Aliança pelo Brasil
- Abbreviation: APB
- President: Jair Bolsonaro
- Vice President: Flávio Bolsonaro
- General Secretary: Admar Gonzaga
- Treasurer: Karina Kufa
- Founded: 12 November 2019
- Dissolved: 30 April 2022
- Split from: Social Liberal Party
- Merged into: Liberal Party
- Headquarters: Brasília, DF, Brazil
- Ideology: Bolsonarism; Anti-communism; Anti-globalism; Brazilian nationalism National conservatism Religious conservatism Right-wing populism Social conservatism
- Political position: Far-right
- TSE Identification Number: 38

Website
- www.aliancapelobrasil.org/

Alliance for Brazil (Portuguese: Aliança pelo Brasil, ALIANÇA) was a Brazilian far-right political group that aimed to become a political party. With national-conservative roots, it was announced by President of Brazil Jair Bolsonaro on 12 November 2019 after stating his departure from the Social Liberal Party (PSL). The organization disbanded in April 2022 for lack of support and after Bolsonaro joined another party.

After a meeting in Palácio do Planalto with PSL lawmakers, Bolsonaro notified them of his resignation from the party and discussed ways to create a new one but still did not formalize his de-affiliation from PSL at that time. After the meeting, Bolsonaro published a message in his social media, stating that "today [12 November] I announced my resignation from PSL and beginning of creation of a new party: Alliance for Brazil", thanking "everyone who collaborated with me in PSL and who were partners in the 2018 elections". In the weeks before the announcement of the party creation, Bolsonaro had many misunderstandings with PSL president Luciano Bivar, which triggered an internal crisis. In October 2019, Bolsonaro stated to a supporter to "forget" the party, saying that Bivar was "doomed".

According to Bolsonaro, the Alliance for Brazil is a "conservative party, that respects all religions, backs family values, supports the right to self-defense, the right to possess a firearm, free-trade with the whole world, without any ideological agenda." The Brazilian media has labeled Bolsonaro's new party as a far-right and right-wing populist movement. Although the party did not officially contest the 2020 Brazilian municipal elections, the Brazilian Labour Renewal Party (PRTB), Republicanos, Patriota, and the Liberal Party (PL) expressed openness to having ALIANÇA candidates on their electoral slates.

A year after the project was launched, however, Bolsonaro admitted several times in late 2020 and early 2021 about the failure to collect the necessary signatures for the creation of Alliance for Brazil, as he only managed 13% of the necessary signatures, eventually joining the Liberal Party to compete in the 2022 Brazilian general election instead.
