= Jenipapo dos Vieiras =

- Municipality
- Location in Maranhão state

- Location in Brazil
- Coordinates: 5°22′15″S 45°38′9″W
- Country: Brazil
- Region: Northeast
- State: Maranhão

Area
  - Total: 1,963 km^{2} (758 sq mi)

Population (2020)
  - Total: 17,040
  - Density: 8.681/km^{2} (22.48/sq mi)
- Time zone: UTC−3 (BRT)

Jenipapo dos Vieiras is a Brazilian municipality in the state of Maranhão. Its population is 17,040 (2020) and its total area is 1,963 km^{2}.
