= Marcos Parente =

- Municipality

- Location in Brazil
- Coordinates: 7°15′S 43°42′W
- Country: Brazil
- Region: Nordeste
- State: Piauí
- Mesoregion: Sudoeste Piauiense

Population (2020)
  - Total: 4,547
- Time zone: UTC−3 (BRT)

Marcos Parente is a municipality in the state of Piauí in the Northeast region of Brazil.

== See also ==
- List of municipalities in Piauí
