= Urbano Santos =

Coordinates: 3°12′S 43°23′W

- Municipality
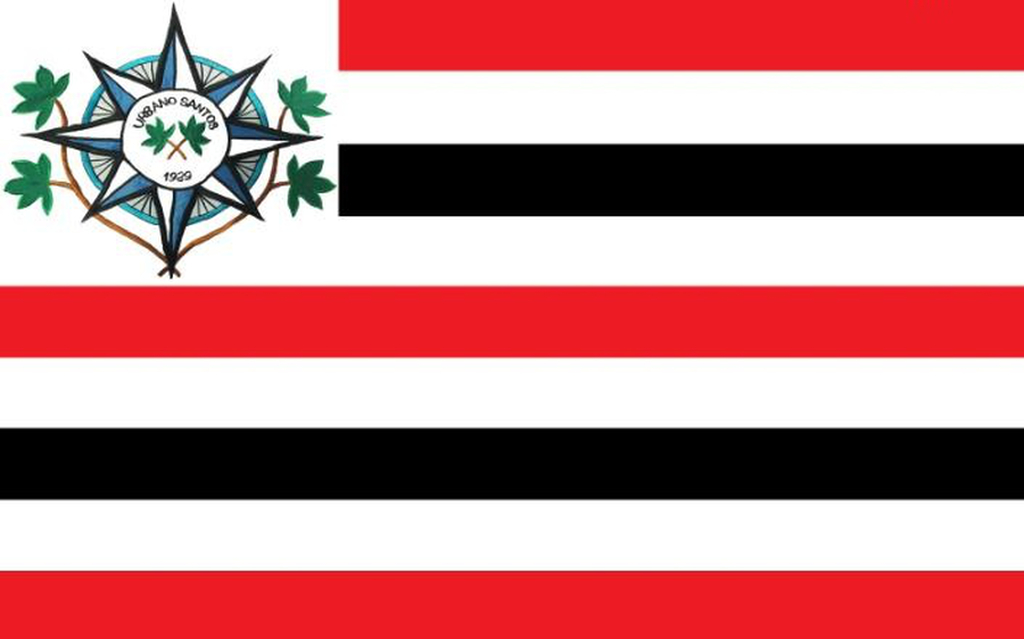
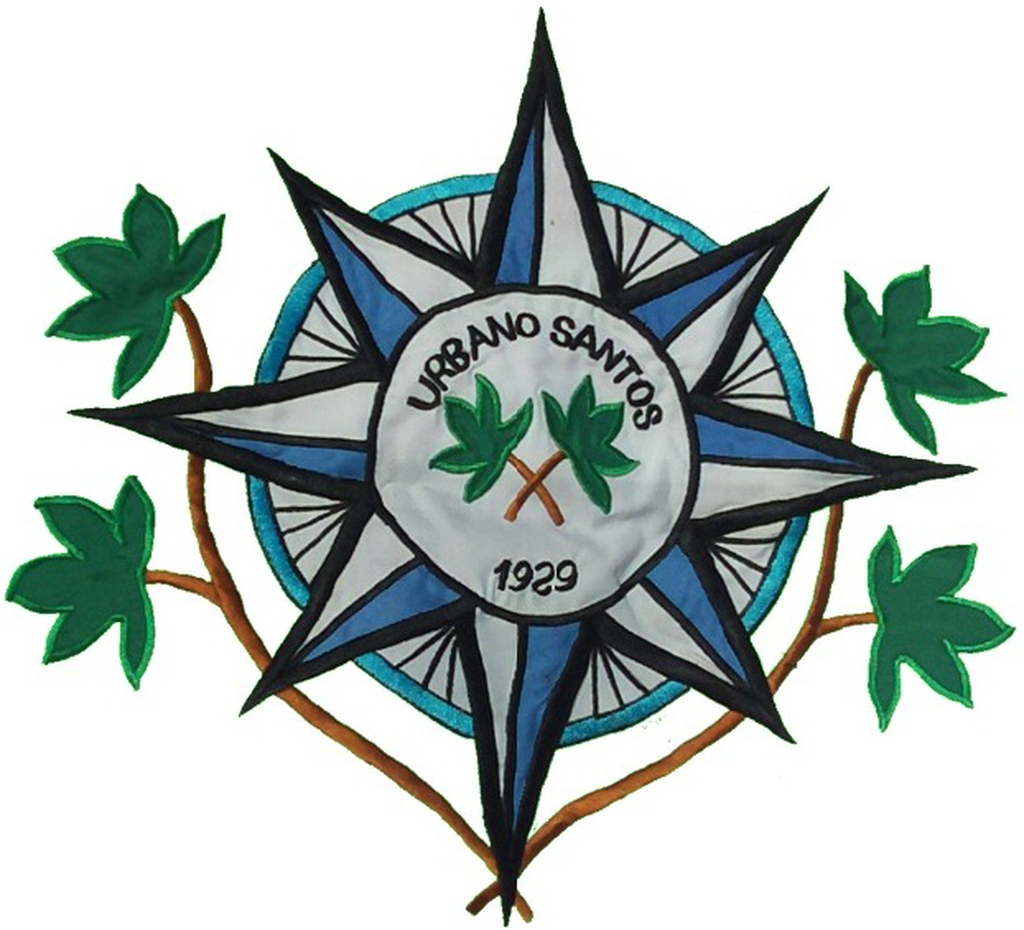
- Flag Coat of arms
- Interactive map of Urbano Santos
- Country: Brazil
- Region: Nordeste
- State: Maranhão
- Mesoregion: Leste Maranhense

Population (2020)
  - Total: 33,459
- Time zone: UTC−3 (BRT)

Urbano Santos is a municipality in the state of Maranhão in the Northeast region of Brazil.

The municipality contains part of the 1,535,310-hectare (3,793,800-acre) Upaon-Açu/Miritiba/Alto Preguiças Environmental Protection Area, created in 1992.

== See also ==
- List of municipalities in Maranhão
