= Felipe Camarão (politician) =

Brazilian politician (born 1981)

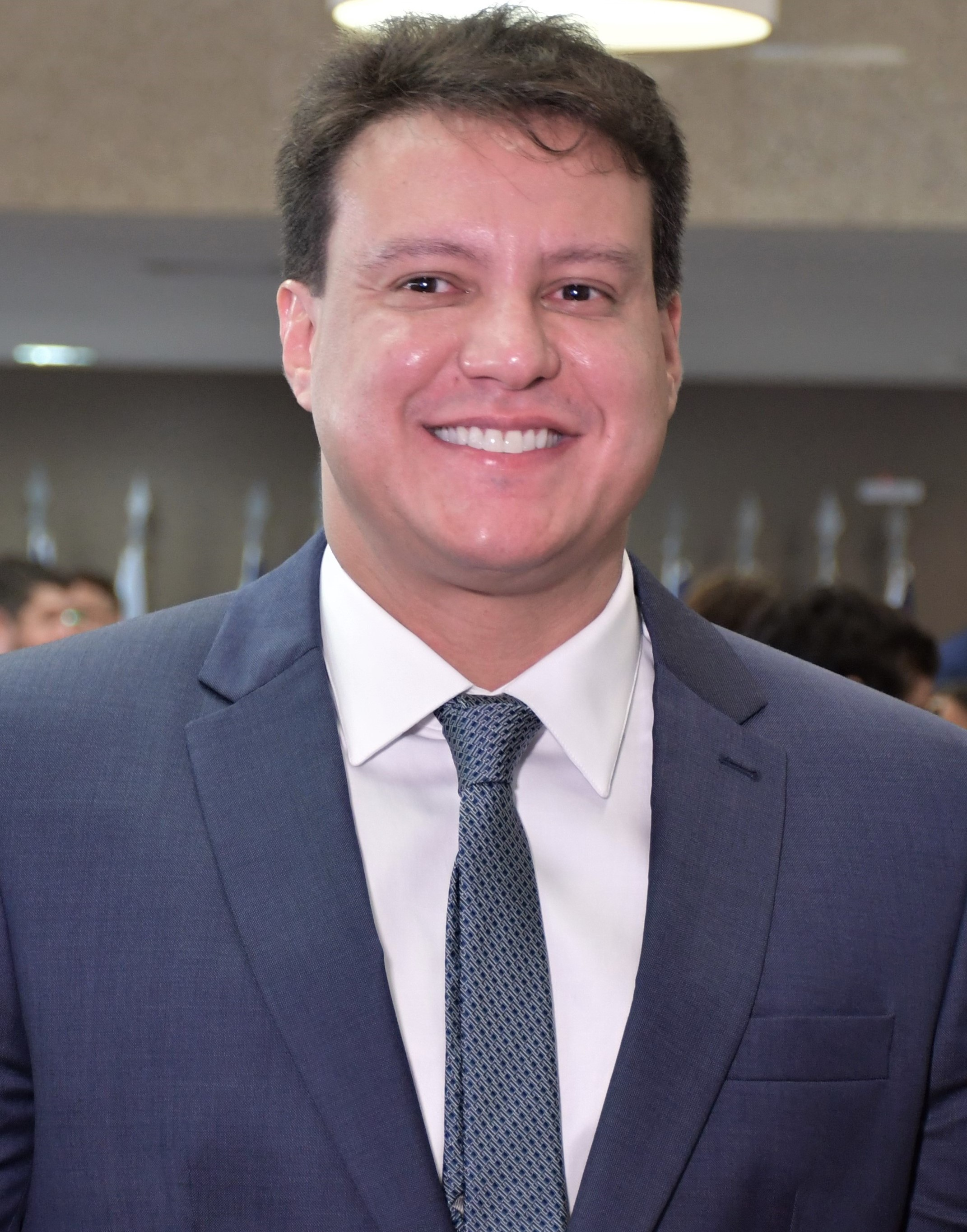
- Camarão in 2023

Vice Governor of Maranhão
- Incumbent
- Assumed office 1 January 2023
- Governor: Carlos Brandão
- Preceded by: Carlos Brandão

Personal details
- Born: 31 December 1981 (age 44)
- Party: Workers' Party (since 2021)

Felipe Costa Camarão (born 31 December 1981) is a Brazilian politician serving as vice governor of Maranhão since 2023. From 2016 to 2022 and from 2023 to 2024, he served as secretary of education of Maranhão.
