= Flávio Dino =

Brazilian attorney, politician and professor (born 1968)

His Excellency Flávio Dino
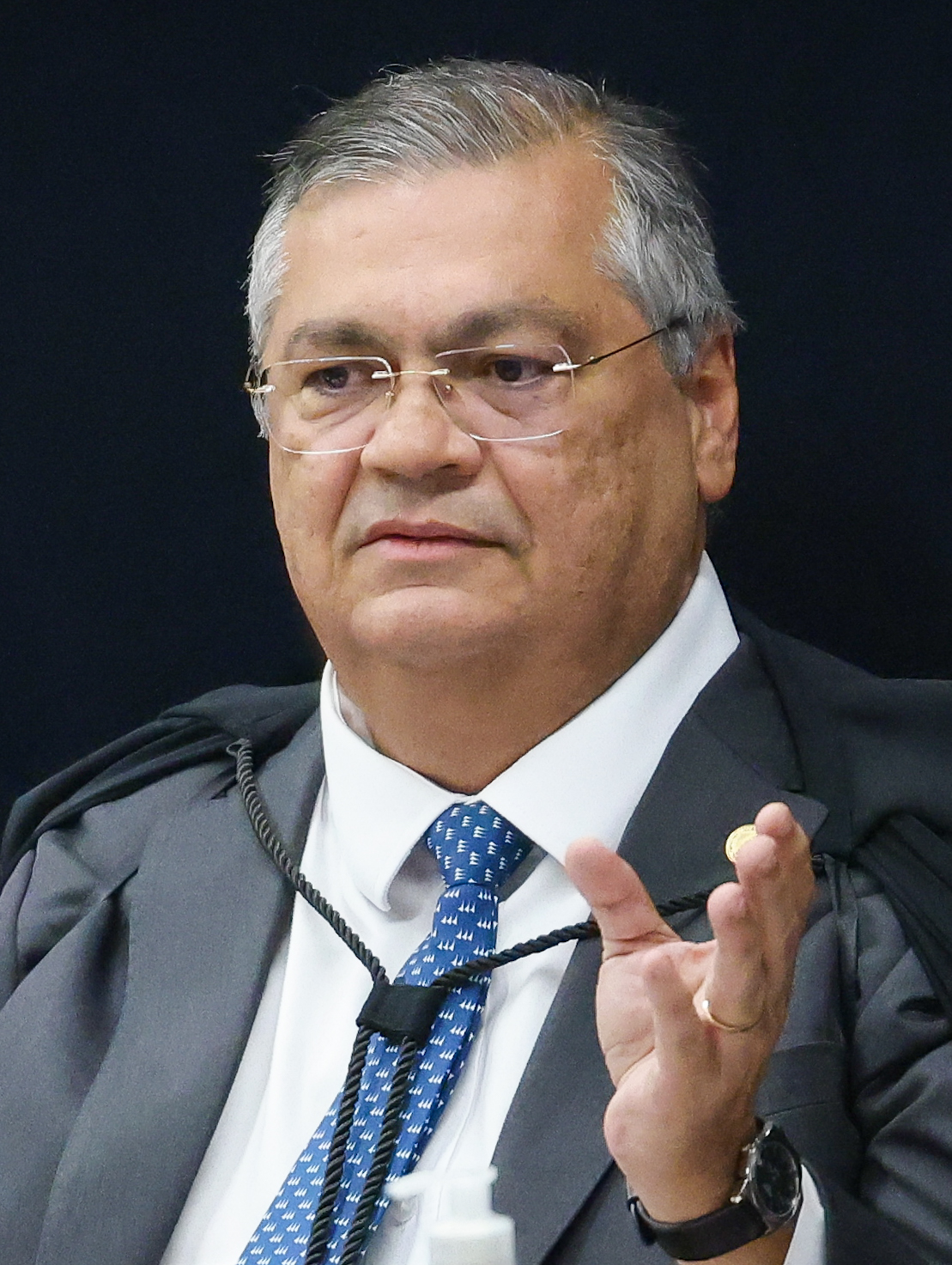
- Dino in 2025

Justice of the Supreme Federal Court
- Incumbent
- Assumed office 22 February 2024
- Appointed by: Luiz Inácio Lula da Silva
- Preceded by: Rosa Weber

Senator for Maranhão
- In office 1 February 2023 – 20 February 2024
- Succeeded by: Ana Paula Lobato

Minister of Justice and Public Security
- In office 1 January 2023 – 1 February 2024
- President: Luiz Inácio Lula da Silva
- Preceded by: Anderson Torres
- Succeeded by: Ricardo Lewandowski

Governor of Maranhão
- In office 1 January 2015 – 2 April 2022
- Vice Governor: Carlos Brandão
- Preceded by: Arnaldo Melo
- Succeeded by: Carlos Brandão

Chair of the Brazilian Tourist Board
- In office 17 June 2011 – 11 March 2014
- President: Dilma Rousseff
- Preceded by: Mário Moysés
- Succeeded by: Vicente Neto

Federal Deputy
- In office 1 February 2007 – 1 February 2011
- Constituency: Maranhão

Personal details
- Born: Flávio Dino de Castro e Costa; 30 April 1968 (age 58) São Luís, Maranhão, Brazil
- Party: PT (1987–1994); PCdoB (2006–2021); PSB (2021–2024)
- Spouse(s): Deane de Castro (m. 1990; div. 2011) Daniela Lima (m. 2011)
- Children: 5
- Parent: Sálvio Dino (father)
- Relatives: Nicolao Dino (brother)
- Education: Federal University of Maranhão (LLB); Federal University of Pernambuco (LLM)
- Occupation: Federal judge (1994–2006)

Flávio Dino de Castro e Costa (Note: Portuguese pronunciation: [ˈfla.vi.u ˈd͡ʒĩ.nu d͡ʒi ˈkas.tɾu i ˈkɔs.tɐ]) (born 30 April 1968) is a Brazilian attorney, Supreme Court Justice, politician and professor. A former federal judge, Dino was elected to the Chamber of Deputies in 2006 under the Communist Party banner, serving a four-year term until 2011, representing the state of Maranhão. He was elected as the governor of Maranhão after running in the 2014 election. He became the governor of Maranhão on 1 January 2015. He was reelected in 2018. In 2021, Dino left the Communist Party to join the Socialist Party, and was appointed Minister of Justice by President Lula.

Dino also served 3 years as president of Embratur, a federal agency promoting Brazilian tourism, between his legislative term and gubernatorial term. Dino was considered a leading left-wing candidate in the 2022 presidential election but chose to forgo a candidacy, instead choosing to run for Senate.

While performing his duty as Minister of Justice, Flávio Dino was nominated by President Lula to the Supreme Court of Brazil, being sworn in office on 22 February 2024 after his confirmation by the Brazilian Senate.

== Early life and family ==
Flávio Dino de Castro e Costa was born in São Luís on 30 April 1968, to lawyers Rita Maria and Sálvio Dino. His father served as a city councillor in São Luís, a state deputy, and mayor of the municipality of João Lisboa. He is the brother of Nicolao Dino, Subprosecutor General of the Republic, and Sálvio Júnior, a lawyer.

Flávio graduated with a bachelor's degree in 1991, and returned to the Federal University of Maranhão in 1993 as a professor. While working as a professor, Dino got involved with the university's activist scene, and later began advising the university's workers unions.

== Political career ==
=== Federal judge ===
Starting in 1994, Dino became a federal judge, ranking first in among the applicants.

From 2000 to 2002, he served as the chair of the National Association of Federal Judges (AJUFE). During his time as a judge, Dino also served as the Secretary-General of the National Council of Justice (CNJ).

In 2006, he resigned from his position as a judge, and decided to devote himself to politics instead.

=== 2008 São Luís mayoral election ===
In 2008, he ran for election as the mayor of São Luís, but was defeated by João Castelo of the Brazilian Social Democracy Party (PSDB).

=== 2010 Maranhão gubernatorial election ===
Flávio Dino ran in the 2010 Maranhão gubernatorial election, but lost to Roseana Sarney of the Brazilian Democratic Movement.

=== 2014 Maranhão gubernatorial election ===
Dino ran again in the 2014 Maranhão gubernatorial election. He campaigned on promises of anti-corruption, expanding clean water access, launching a housing construction and renovation program, and improving public security. In 2014, he was elected as the state's governor in the first round of the election, with 63.52 percent of the valid votes.

=== 2018 Maranhão gubernatorial election ===
Dino ran for re-election in the 2018 Maranhão gubernatorial election and won, with 59.29% of the vote in the first round.

=== 2022 Maranhão senatorial election ===
Dino resigned as the governor of Maranhão on 2 April 2022, in order to run in the 2022 Maranhão gubernatorial election as a candidate for the Federal Senate.

=== Electoral history ===
| Year | Election | Party | Office | Coalition | Partners | Party | Votes | Percent | Result |
|---|---|---|---|---|---|---|---|---|---|
| 2006 | State Election of Maranhão | PCdoB | Federal Deputy | The People in Power (PSB, PT, PCdoB, PRB, PMN) | —N/a | | 123,597 | 4.77% | Elected |
| 2008 | Municipal Election of São Luís | PCdoB | Mayor | Popular Unity (PCdoB, PT) | Rodrigo Comerciário | PT | 167,436 | 34.28% | Runoff |
| 2008 | Municipal Election of São Luís | PCdoB | Mayor | Popular Unity (PCdoB, PT) | Rodrigo Comerciário | PT | 214,302 | 44.16% | Not elected |
| 2010 | State Election of Maranhão | PCdoB | Governor | Change Maranhão (PCdoB, PPS, PSB) | Miosótis Gomes | PPS | 859,402 | 29.49% | Not elected |
| 2014 | State Election of Maranhão | PCdoB | Governor | All for Maranhão (PCdoB, PSB, PSDB, PPS, PP, SD, PDT, PTC, PROS) | Carlos Brandão | PSDB | 1,877,064 | 63.52% | Elected |
| 2018 | State Election of Maranhão | PCdoB | Governor | All for Maranhão (PCdoB, PRB, PDT, PPS, PT, AVANTE, PTB, PROS, PSB, PR, DEM, PP, Patriota, PTC, Solidariedade, PPL) | Carlos Brandão | Republicanos | 1,867,396 | 59.29% | Elected |
| 2022 | State Election of Maranhão | PSB | Senator | For the Good of Maranhão (PSB, PT, PCdoB, PV, PSDB, Cidadania, MDB, Patriota, PP, PODE) | Ana Paula Lobato | PSB | 2,125,811 | 62.41 | Elected |
| 2022 | State Election of Maranhão | PSB | Senator | For the Good of Maranhão (PSB, PT, PCdoB, PV, PSDB, Cidadania, MDB, Patriota, PP, PODE) | Lourdinha | PCdoB | 2,125,811 | 62.41 | Elected |

== Notes ==
Political offices
| Preceded by Roseana Sarney | Governor of Maranhão; 2015–2022 | Succeeded by Carlos Brandão |
| Preceded by Anderson Torres | Minister of Justice and Public Security; 2023–2024 | Succeeded by Ricardo Lewandowski |
Legal offices
| Preceded by Rosa Weber | Justice of the Supreme Federal Court; 2024–present | Incumbent |
