= Admar Gonzaga =

Brazilian politician

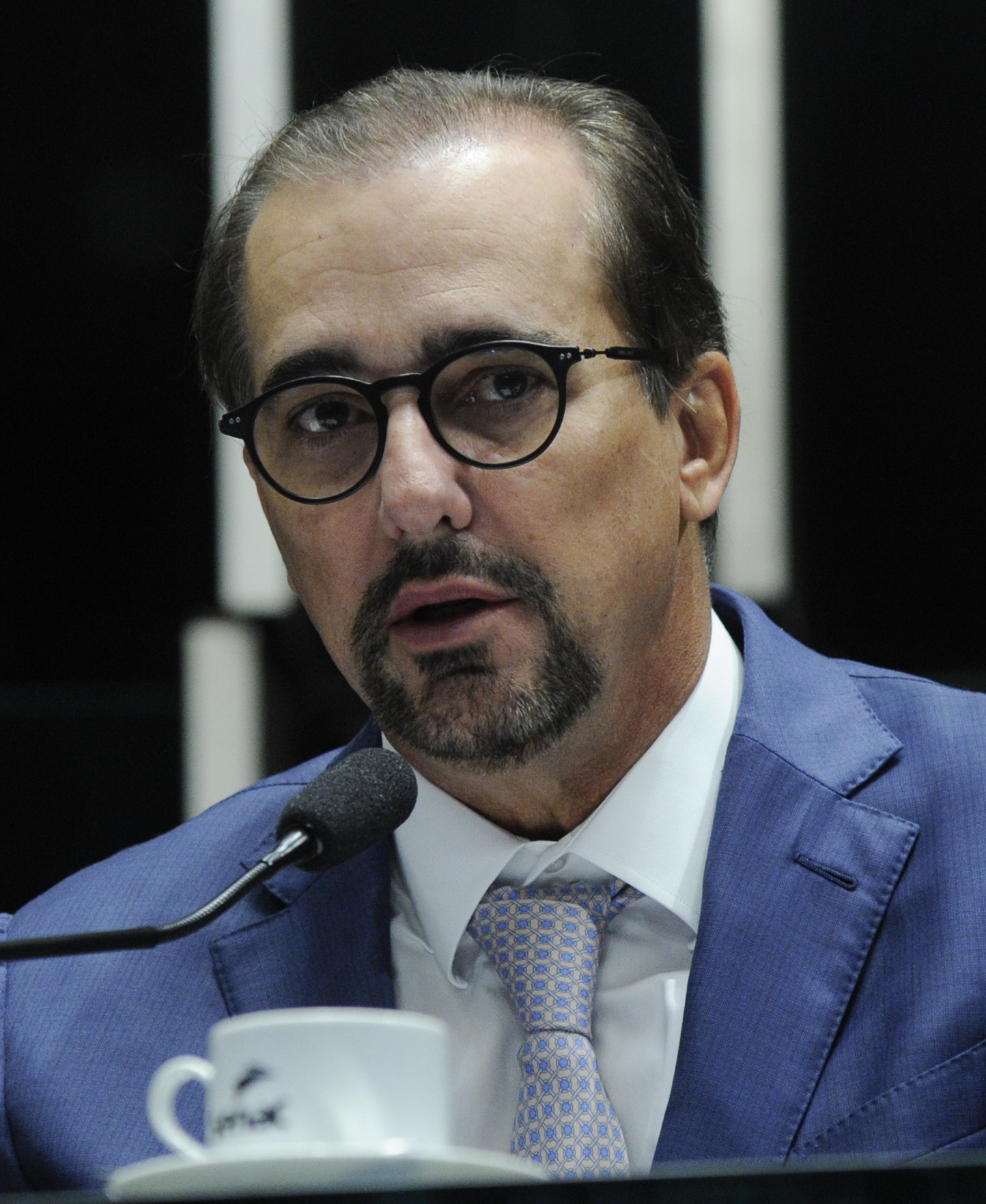
- Gonzaga in 2018

Justice of the Superior Electoral Court
- In office 27 April 2017 – 27 April 2019
- Appointed by: Michel Temer
- Preceded by: Henrique Neves da Silva
- Succeeded by: Sérgio Banhos

Substitute Justice of the Superior Electoral Court
- In office 25 June 2013 – 27 April 2017
- Appointed by: Dilma Rousseff
- Preceded by: Henrique Neves da Silva
- Succeeded by: Sérgio Banhos

Personal details
- Born: Admar Gonzaga Neto; 25 July 1960 (age 66) Rio de Janeiro, Brazil
- Party: ALIANÇA (2019–22)
- Spouse: Élida Souza Matos (m. 2005; div. 2017)
- Children: Henry Zaga, Fernanda Gonzaga
- Education: Centro Universitário de Brasília (LL.B.)

Admar Gonzaga Neto (born 25 July 1960) is a Brazilian politician, attorney, jurist and current General Secretary of Alliance for Brazil (APB). He was Justice of the Superior Electoral Court (TSE), nominated by Michel Temer to the seat destinated to attorneys. With electoral career since 1993, Admar was member of the Jurists Special Committee created to propose changes to the Electoral Code.

== Biography ==
After obtaining a Bachelor of Laws from the Brasília University Center, he was a public employee at the Santa Catarina State Bank, typist and legal advisor in the Chamber of Deputies, besides legislative technical analyst, being transferred to the Federal Senate and place in the Democrats (DEM) leadership, which he was legislative advisor in the 1988 Constituent National Assembly.

Began advocating in 1993 and was legal advisor and national delegate of the then Brazilian Progressive Party (PPB, current PP), legal advisor and national delegate of the Liberal Front Party (PFL), and legal advisor of Democrats (DEM). He also advocated in the conversion of PFL to DEM and in the creation of the Social Democratic Party (PSD).

In 1998, Gonzaga advocated for the reelection campaign of Fernando Henrique Cardoso (PSDB), and in 2010 advocated for the campaign of Dilma Rousseff (PT).

He is member of the Brazilian Institute of Electoral Law, author of books and manuals of Electoral Law, professor and lecturer of events about the subject.

In June 2013, he was sworn in by Dilma Rousseff in his first term as TSE Substitute Justice. He took the seat left from Justice Henrique Neves da Silva, who became Effective Justice after the end of Marcelo Ribeiro's term. In March 2017, with the end of Neves' term, he was nominated by president Michel Temer as TSE Effective Justice. In June 2017, he voted for the acquittal in the trial of Rousseff-Temer ticket.

In November 2017, he was accused of aggression by his wife, Élida Souza. Due to the complaint, he gave up a second term as Justice, ending his term on 27 April 2019.

== Notes ==
Legal offices
Preceded by Henrique Neves da Silva	Substitute Justice of the Superior Electoral Court; 2013–2017	Succeeded by Sérgio Banhos
Preceded by Henrique Neves da Silva	Justice of the Superior Electoral Court; 2017–2019	Succeeded by Sérgio Banhos
