= Colinas, Maranhão =

Coordinates: 6.02583°S 44.2489°W

Colinas
- Municipality
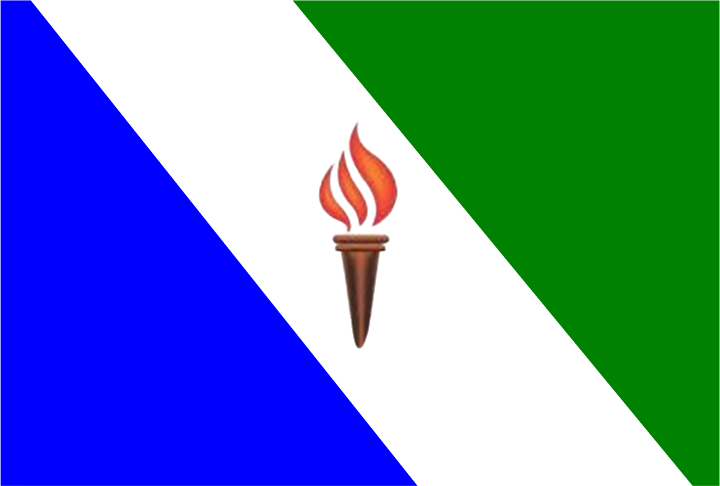
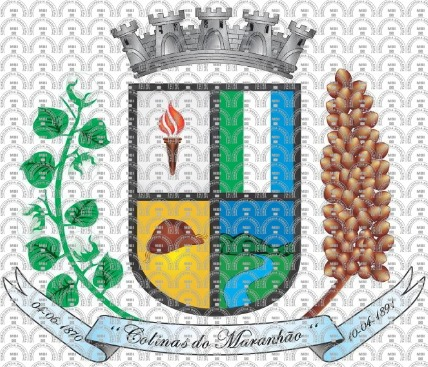
- Flag Coat of arms
- Interactive map of Colinas
- Country: Brazil
- Region: Nordeste
- State: Maranhão
- Mesoregion: Leste Maranhense

Population (2020)
  - Total: 41,312
- Time zone: UTC−3 (BRT)

Colinas is a municipality in the state of Maranhão in the Northeast region of Brazil.

== Climate ==
Climate data for Colinas (1981–2010)
Month	Jan	Feb	Mar	Apr	May	Jun	Jul	Aug	Sep	Oct	Nov	Dec	Year
Mean daily maximum °C (°F)	31.4 (88.5)	31.2 (88.2)	31.1 (88.0)	31.5 (88.7)	32.0 (89.6)	32.5 (90.5)	33.2 (91.8)	34.7 (94.5)	35.6 (96.1)	35.2 (95.4)	33.8 (92.8)	32.1 (89.8)	32.9 (91.2)
Daily mean °C (°F)	26.0 (78.8)	25.8 (78.4)	25.8 (78.4)	26.0 (78.8)	26.0 (78.8)	25.5 (77.9)	25.4 (77.7)	26.4 (79.5)	27.9 (82.2)	28.3 (82.9)	27.6 (81.7)	26.6 (79.9)	26.4 (79.5)
Mean daily minimum °C (°F)	22.2 (72.0)	22.1 (71.8)	22.3 (72.1)	22.3 (72.1)	21.4 (70.5)	19.8 (67.6)	18.8 (65.8)	19.0 (66.2)	21.1 (70.0)	22.7 (72.9)	22.8 (73.0)	22.5 (72.5)	21.4 (70.5)
Average precipitation mm (inches)	195.5 (7.70)	190.3 (7.49)	280.3 (11.04)	205.7 (8.10)	69.9 (2.75)	15.2 (0.60)	6.6 (0.26)	6.9 (0.27)	28.3 (1.11)	69.1 (2.72)	100.2 (3.94)	147.0 (5.79)	1,315 (51.77)
Average precipitation days (≥ 1.0 mm)	12	13	18	15	6	2	1	1	2	5	7	9	91
Average relative humidity (%)	81.3	83.0	85.3	83.9	78.2	71.0	63.6	56.2	56.2	61.0	69.1	77.2	72.2
Mean monthly sunshine hours	142.2	128.1	143.2	167.2	221.9	266.9	291.8	291.9	242.1	207.6	174.3	150.0	2,427.2
Source: Instituto Nacional de Meteorologia

== See also ==
- List of municipalities in Maranhão
