= João Lisboa =

Coordinates: 5°22′S 47°17′W

- Municipality
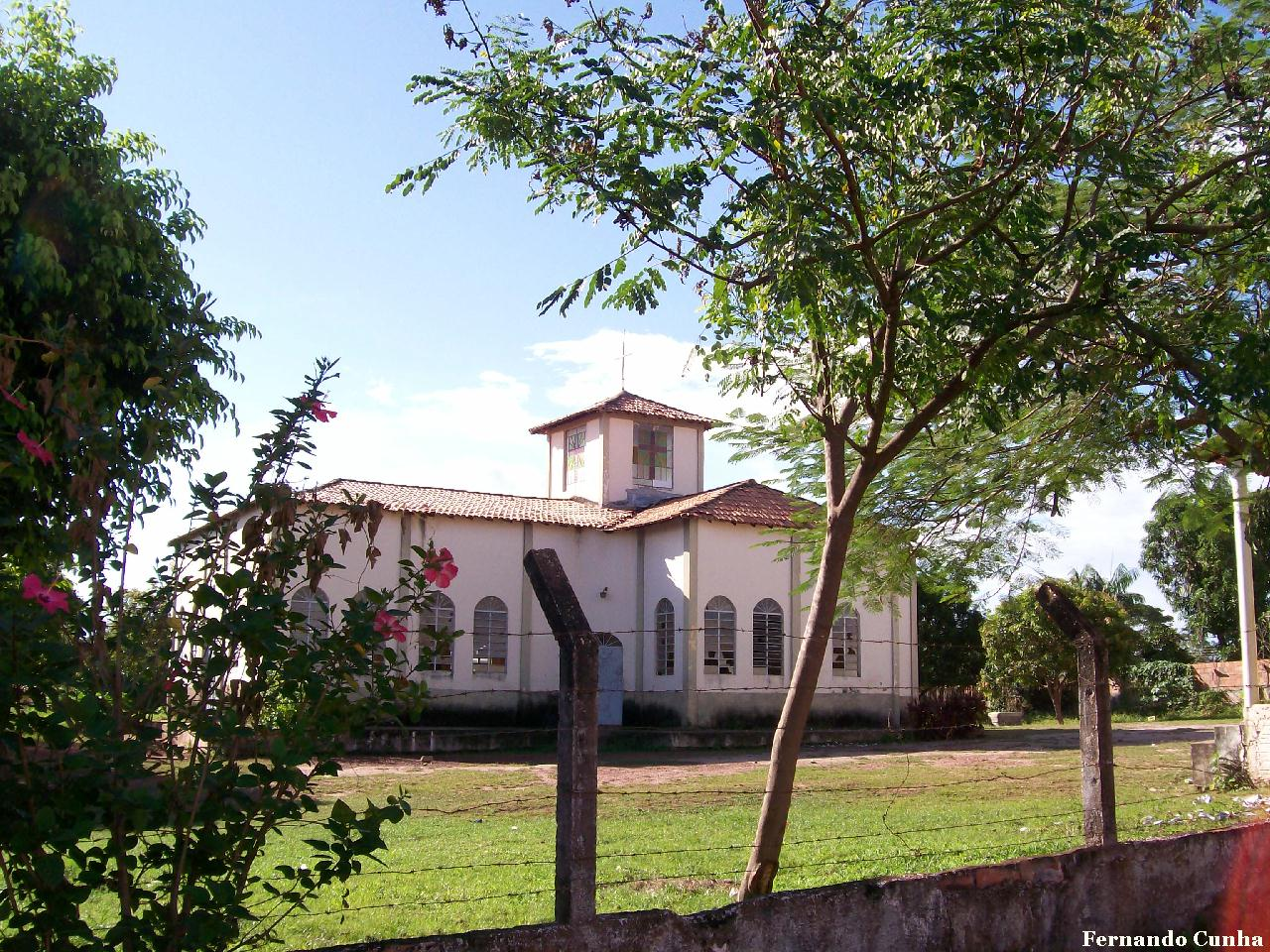

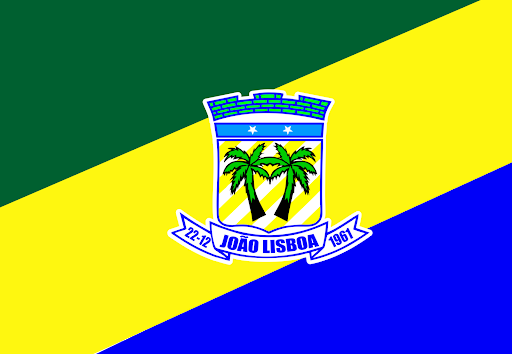
- Flag
- Interactive map of João Lisboa
- Country: Brazil
- Region: Nordeste
- State: Maranhão
- Mesoregion: Oeste Maranhense

Area
  - Total: 438 sq mi (1,135 km^{2})

Population (2020)
  - Total: 23,740
- Time zone: UTC−3 (BRT)

João Lisboa is a municipality in the state of Maranhão in the Northeast region of Brazil.

== See also ==
- List of municipalities in Maranhão
