= Maranhãozinho =

- Municipality
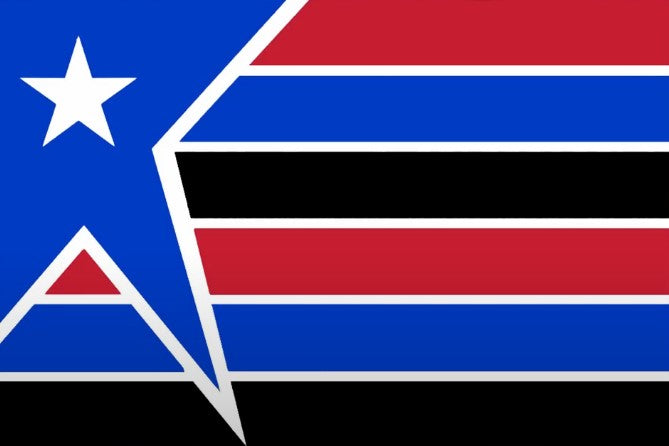
- Flag

- Location in Maranhão state

- Location in Brazil
- Coordinates: 2°14′27″S 45°51′3″W
- Country: Brazil
- Region: Northeast
- State: Maranhão

Area
  - Total: 761 km^{2} (294 sq mi)

Population (2020)
  - Total: 16,511
  - Density: 21.7/km^{2} (56.2/sq mi)
- Time zone: UTC−3 (BRT)

Maranhãozinho is a Brazilian municipality in the state of Maranhão. Its population is 16,511 (2020) and its area is 761 km^{2}.
