= São Pedro dos Crentes =

Coordinates: 6.82583°S 46.5319°W

- Municipality
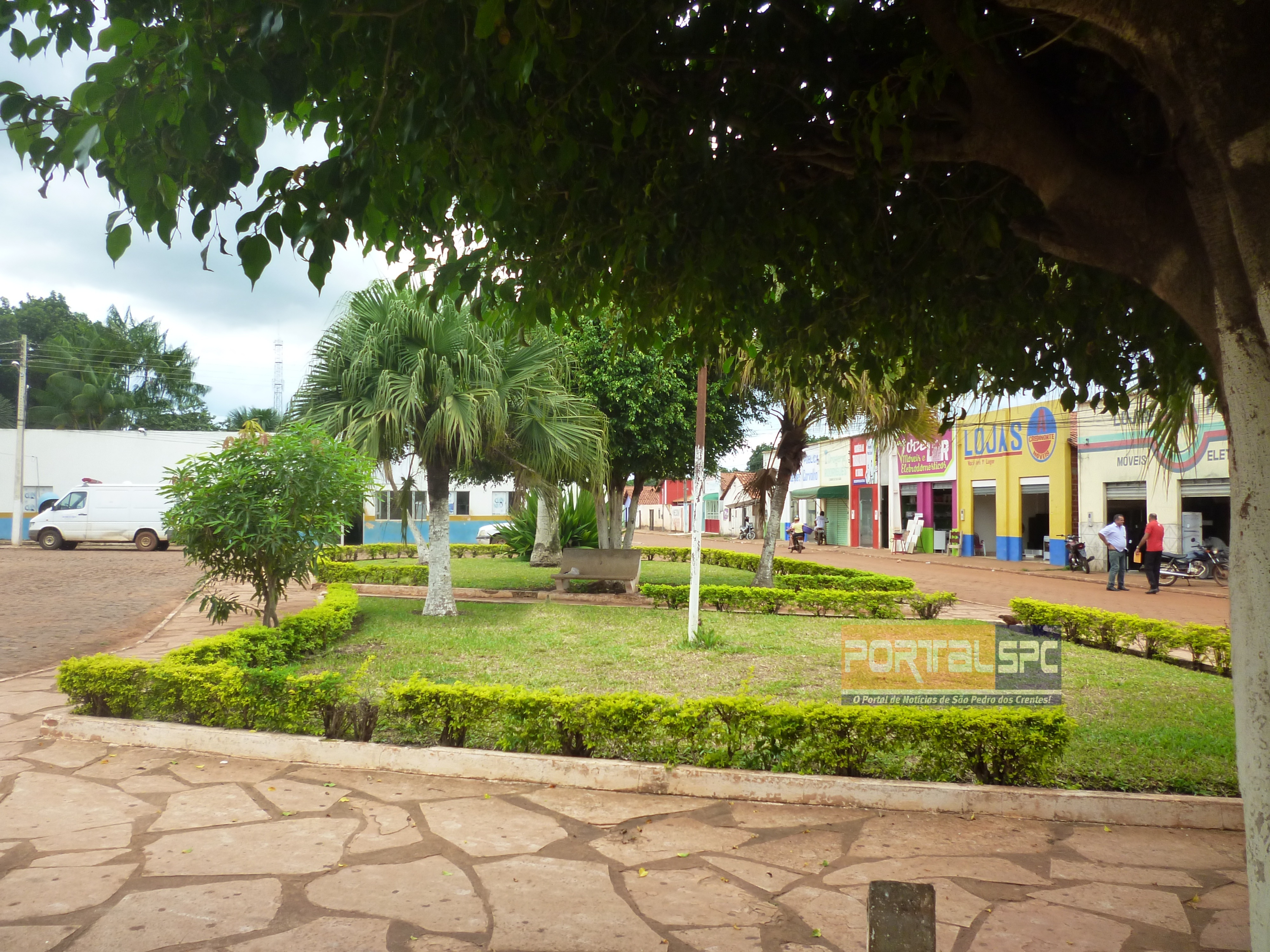
- Interactive map of São Pedro dos Crentes
- Country: Brazil
- Region: Nordeste
- State: Maranhão
- Mesoregion: Sul Maranhense

Area
  - Total: 380 sq mi (980 km^{2})

Population (2022)
  - Total: 5,783
- Time zone: UTC−3 (BRT)

São Pedro dos Crentes is a municipality in the state of Maranhão in the Northeast region of Brazil.

== See also ==
- List of municipalities in Maranhão
