= Carlos Brandão =

Brazilian politician (born 1958)

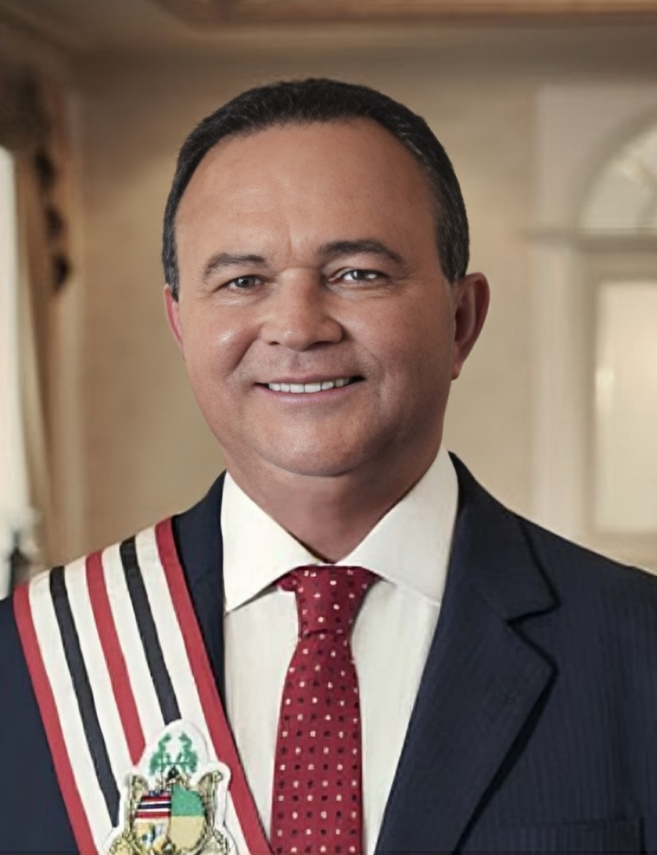
- Brandão in 2016

Governor of Maranhão
- Incumbent
- Assumed office 2 April 2022
- Vice Governor: None (Apr–Dec 2022); Felipe Camarão (2023–present)
- Preceded by: Flávio Dino

Vice Governor of Maranhão
- In office 1 January 2015 – 2 April 2022
- Governor: Flávio Dino
- Preceded by: Washington Luiz
- Succeeded by: Felipe Camarão

Member of the Chamber of Deputies
- In office 4 February 2012 – 29 December 2014
- Constituency: Maranhão
- In office 1 February 2007 – 4 October 2011
- Constituency: Maranhão

Personal details
- Born: Carlos Orleans Brandão Junior; 2 June 1958 (age 68) Colinas, Maranhão, Brazil
- Party: PSB (since 2022)
- Other political affiliations: DEM (1990–2006); PSDB (2006–2017); Republicanos (2017–2021); PSDB (2021–2022)
- Education: Maranhão State University
- Profession: Businessman and veterinarian
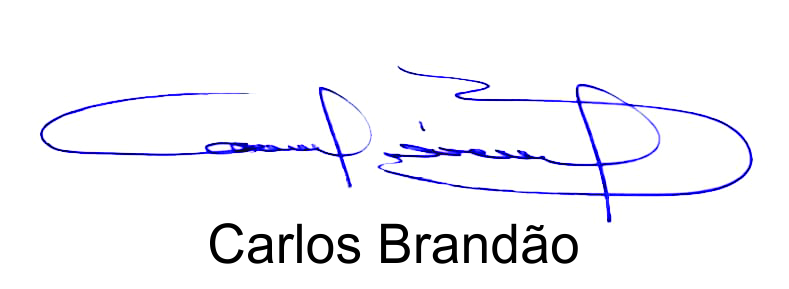
- Signature

Carlos Orleans Brandão Júnior (born 2 June 1958) is a Brazilian politician affiliated to the Brazilian Socialist Party. He is currently the governor of Maranhão, after the resignation of Flávio Dino on 2 April 2022. He was the Vice Governor of Maranhão between 2015 and 2022, and was reelected in 2018 in Flávio Dino's gubernatorial ticket. Previously, he was a Federal Deputy for Maranhão for two consecutive terms. He holds a degree in Veterinary Medicine at the State University of Maranhão.

Political offices
Preceded by Washington Luiz de Oliveira	Vice Governor of Maranhão; 2015–2022	Vacant Title next held by Felipe Camarão
Preceded by Flávio Dino	Governor of Maranhão; 2022–present	Incumbent
