= Pinheiro, Maranhão =

Pinheiro
- Municipality
- The Municipality of Pinheiro
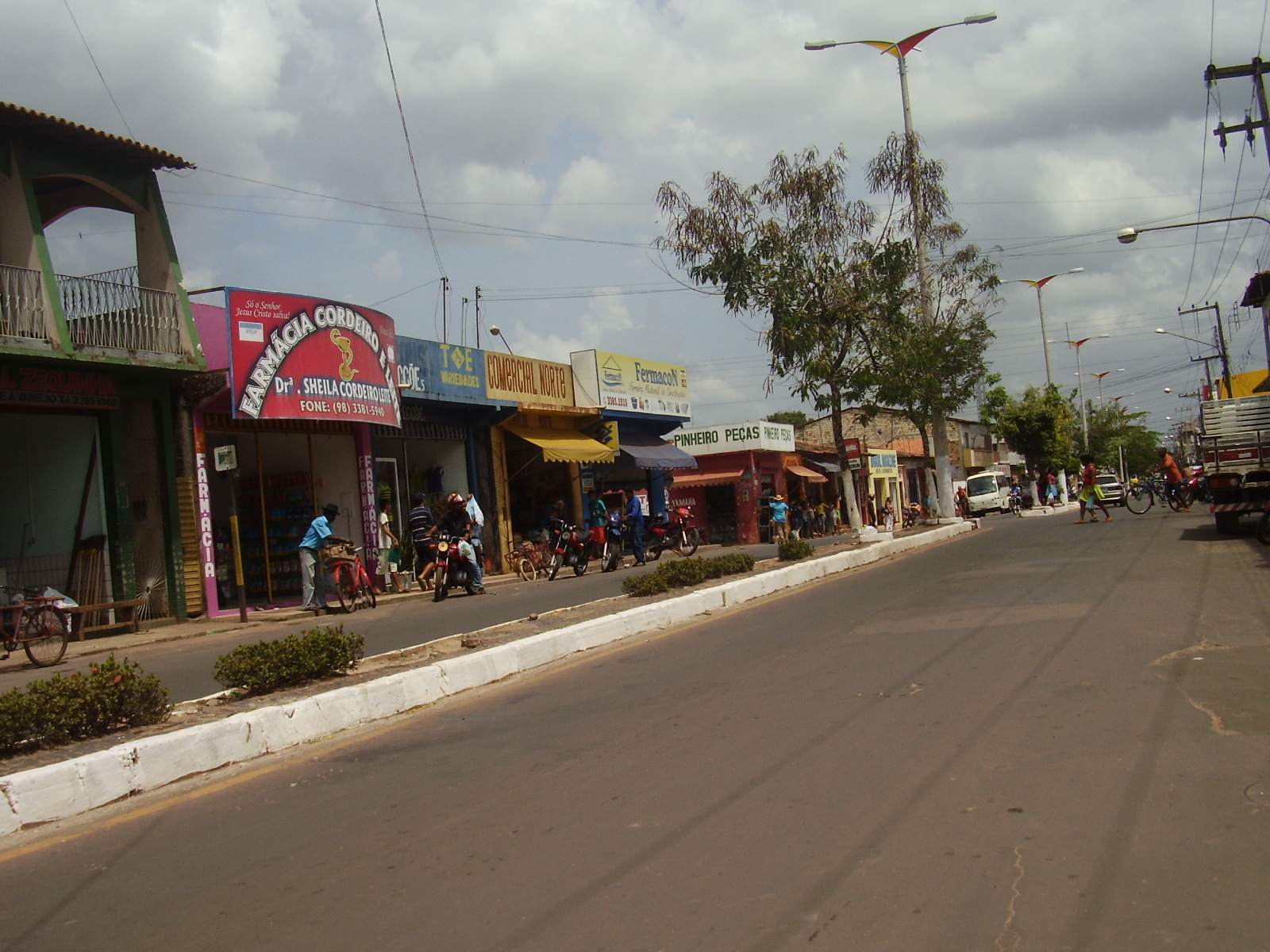
- An avenue in Pinheiro

- Flag Coat of arms
- Nickname: "Princesa da Baixada" (Princess of the Baixada)
- Location of Pinheiro in the State of Maranhão
- Coordinates: 02°31′15″S 45°04′58″W
- Country: Brazil
- Region: Northeast
- State: Maranhão
- Founded: September 3, 1856

Government
  - Mayor: Luciano Genésio (Avante)

Area
  - Total: 1,465.503 km^{2} (565.834 sq mi)

Population (2020)
  - Total: 83,777
  - Density: 57.166/km^{2} (148.06/sq mi)
- Time zone: UTC−3 (BRT)
- HDI (2000): 0.639 – medium
- Website: www.pinheiro.ma.gov.br

Pinheiro is a municipality in the state of Maranhão in the Northeast region of Brazil.

The municipality contains a small part of the Baixada Maranhense Environmental Protection Area, a 1,775,035.6-hectare (4,386,208-acre) sustainable use conservation unit created in 1991 that has been a Ramsar Site since 2000.

== See also ==
- List of municipalities in Maranhão
