= Legislative Assembly of Maranhão =

Legislative Assembly of Maranhão Assembleia Legislativa do Maranhão
- 20th Legislature of Maranhão

Type
- Type: Unicameral

Leadership
- President: Iracema Vale, PSB since 2 February 2023

Structure
- Seats: 42 deputies
- Political groups: Government (39) PSB (10) PL (6) PCdoB (4) PDT (4) PP (4) MDB (2) PSD (2) Podemos (2) PRD (2) UNIÃO (1) Republicans (1) PRTB (1) Opposition (3) Solidarity (2) NOVO (1)

Meeting place
- Novo Palácio Manuel Beckman, São Luís, Maranhão, Brazil

Website
- www.al.ma.leg.br/home/

The Legislative Assembly of Maranhão (Portuguese: Assembleia Legislativa do Maranhão) is the unicameral legislature of the Brazilian state of Maranhão. The assembly, which is seated in the state capital of São Luís, is composed of has 42 state deputies elected by proportional representation.
