= 1986 Maranhão gubernatorial election =

← 1982	November 15, 1986	1990 →
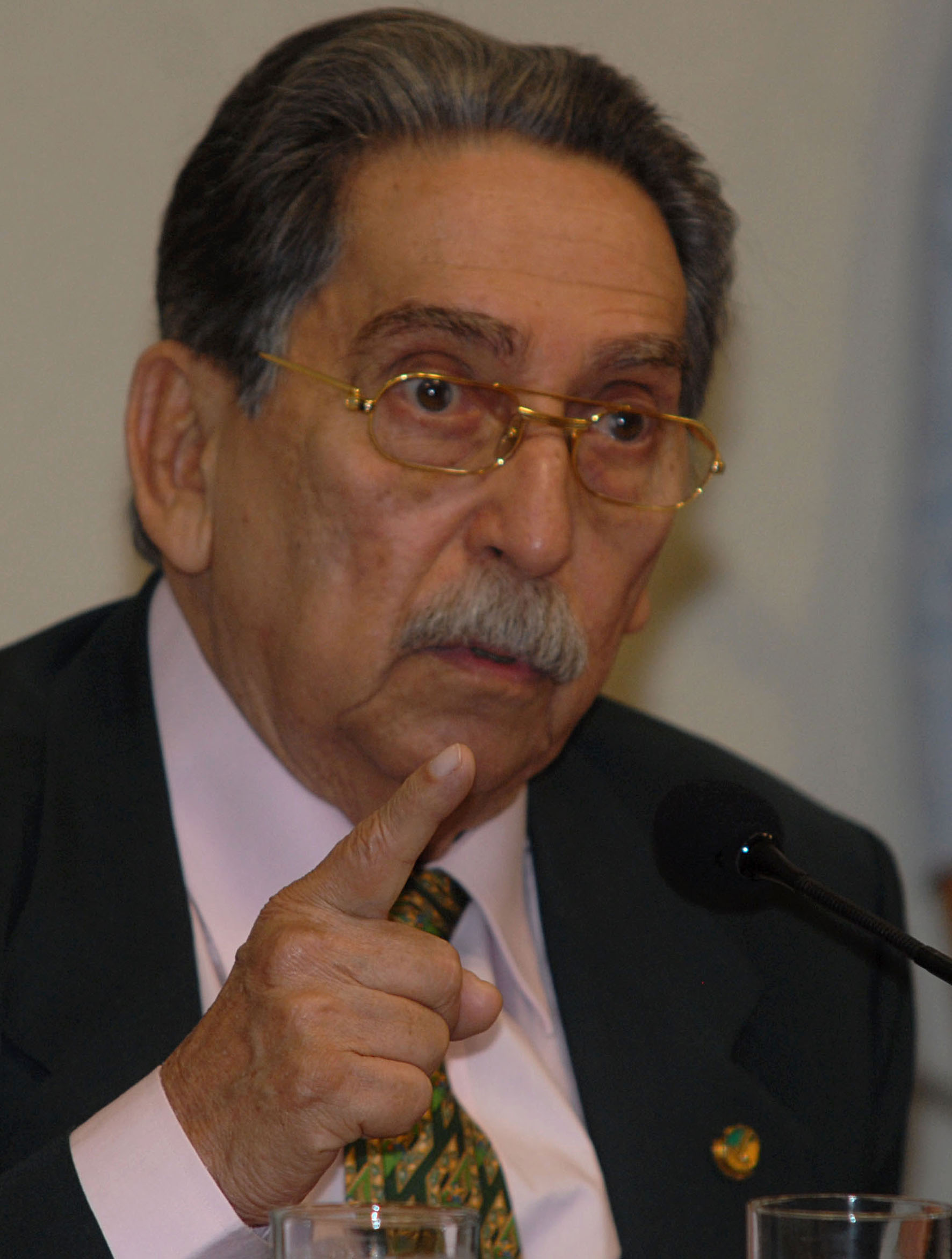

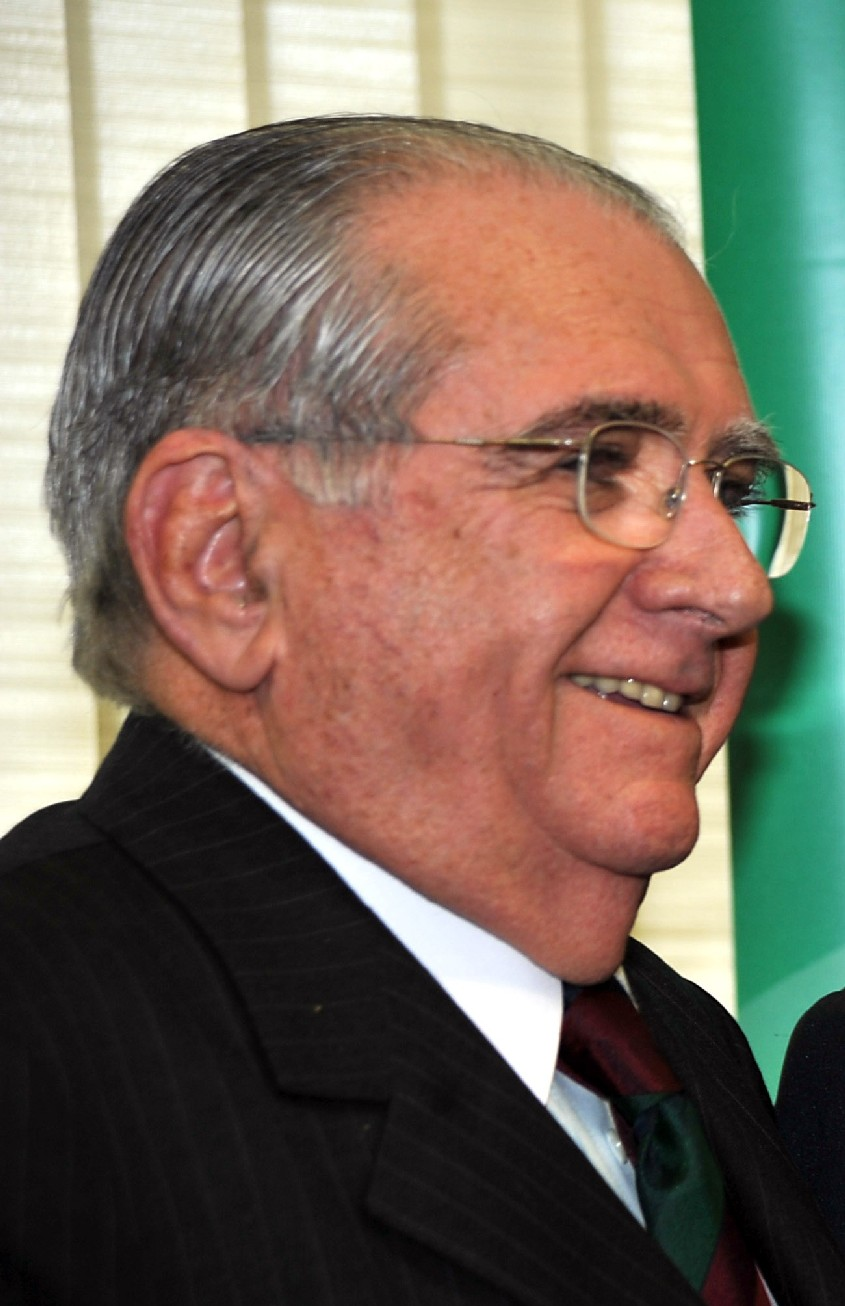
Candidate	Epitácio Cafeteira	João Castelo
Party	MDB	PDS
Running mate	João Alberto; PFL	Ildon Marques; PDS
Popular vote	1,040,384	212,133
Percentage	81.03%	16.52%
Governor before election
Luís Rocha
PFL
Elected Governor
Epitácio Cafeteira
MDB

The Maranhão gubernatorial election of 1986 as held in Brazilian state of Maranhão on November 15, alongside Brazil's general elections. PMDB candidate, Epitácio Cafeteira, was elected on November 15, 1986.
