= 2006 Maranhão gubernatorial election =

← 2002	October 1, 2006; October 29, 2006	2010 →
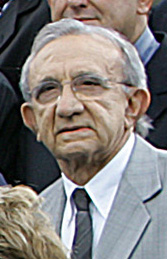

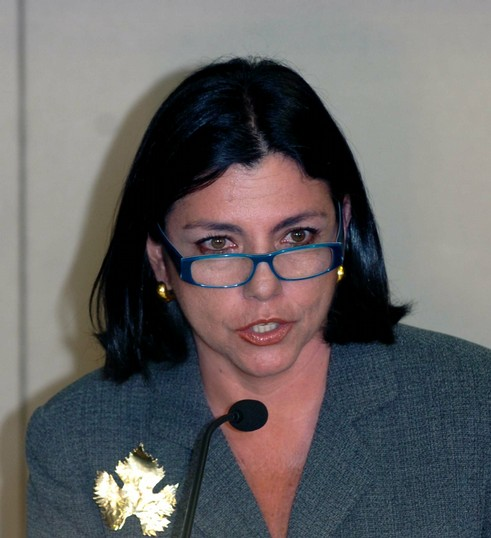
Candidate	Jackson Lago	Roseana Sarney
Party	PDT	PFL
Popular vote	1.393.754	1.295.880
Percentage	51,82%	48,18%
Governor before election
Reinaldo
PSB
Elected Governor
Lago
PDT

The Maranhão gubernatorial election was held on 1 and 29 October 2006 to elect the Governor of Maranhão. The result was a victory for Jackson Lago, when defeated the Sarney oligarchy, when 40 years, Sarney was elected, but was repealed in March 2009, by the Superior Electoral Court.

== Candidates ==
- Roseana, PFL
  25
  João Alberto
  Maranhão The Strength of the People
  47%
- Lago, PDT
  12
  Porto, PPS
  Maranhão's Liberation Front
  (PDT, PPS, PAN)
  34%
- Vidigal, PSB
  40
  Fernandes
  The People in Power
  (PSB, PT, PCdoB, PRB, PMN)
  14%
- Aderson, PSDB
  45
  Formiga
  PSDB
  Unlocking to Develop
  (PSDB)
  3%
- Others
  1%

== Sarney defeated ==
Senator Sarney sad the defeat, that Lago defeated the daughter Roseana, but Lago supported Lula. PT supported Lago in second round. But Maranhão's Libertation Front, wins on second round, Roseana lost to Lago. But Lago compared Sarney to ACM.
