= 1990 Maranhão gubernatorial election =

Maranhão gubernatorial election, 1990
← 1986	October 3, 1990; November 25, 1990	1994 →
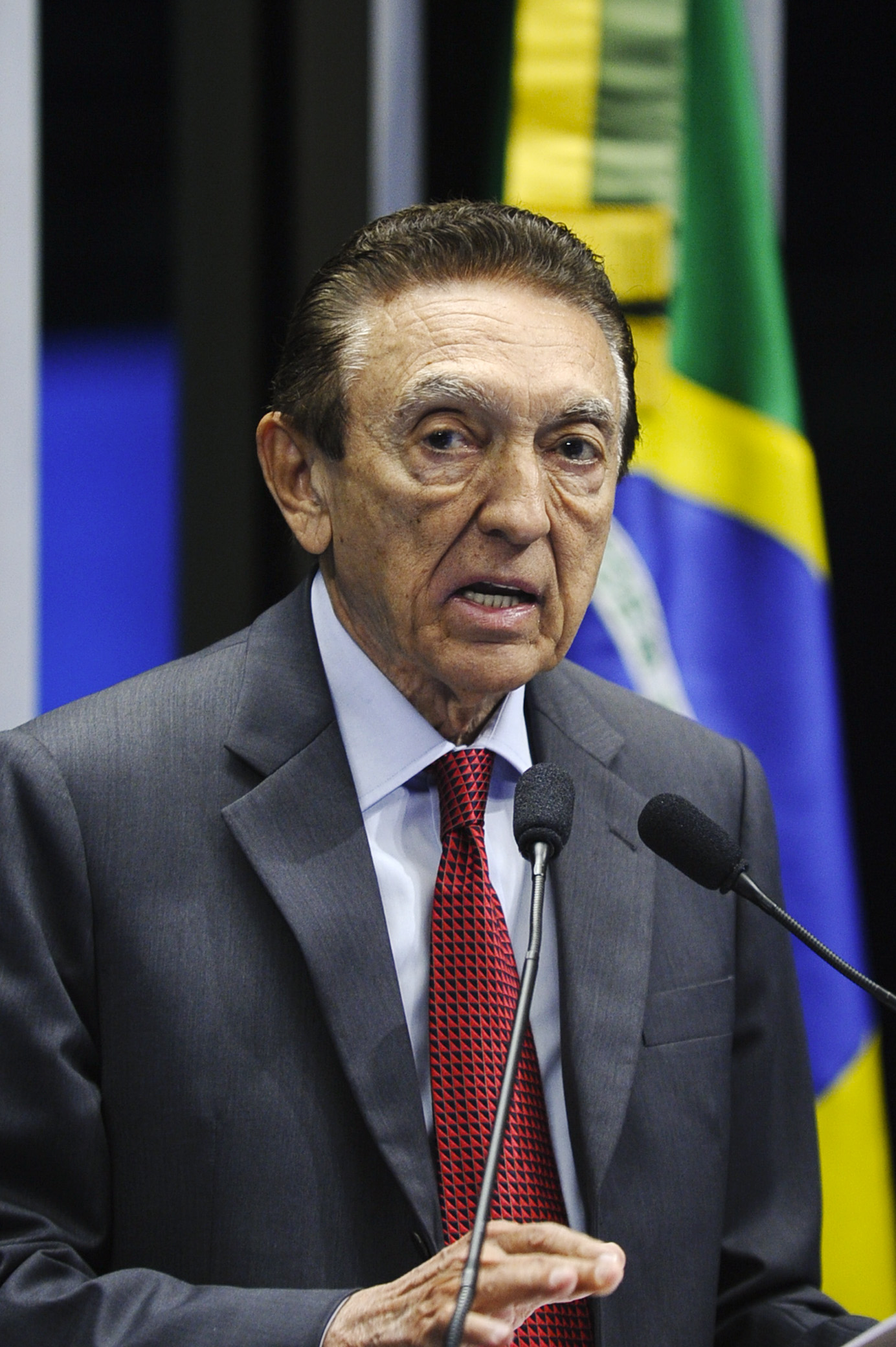

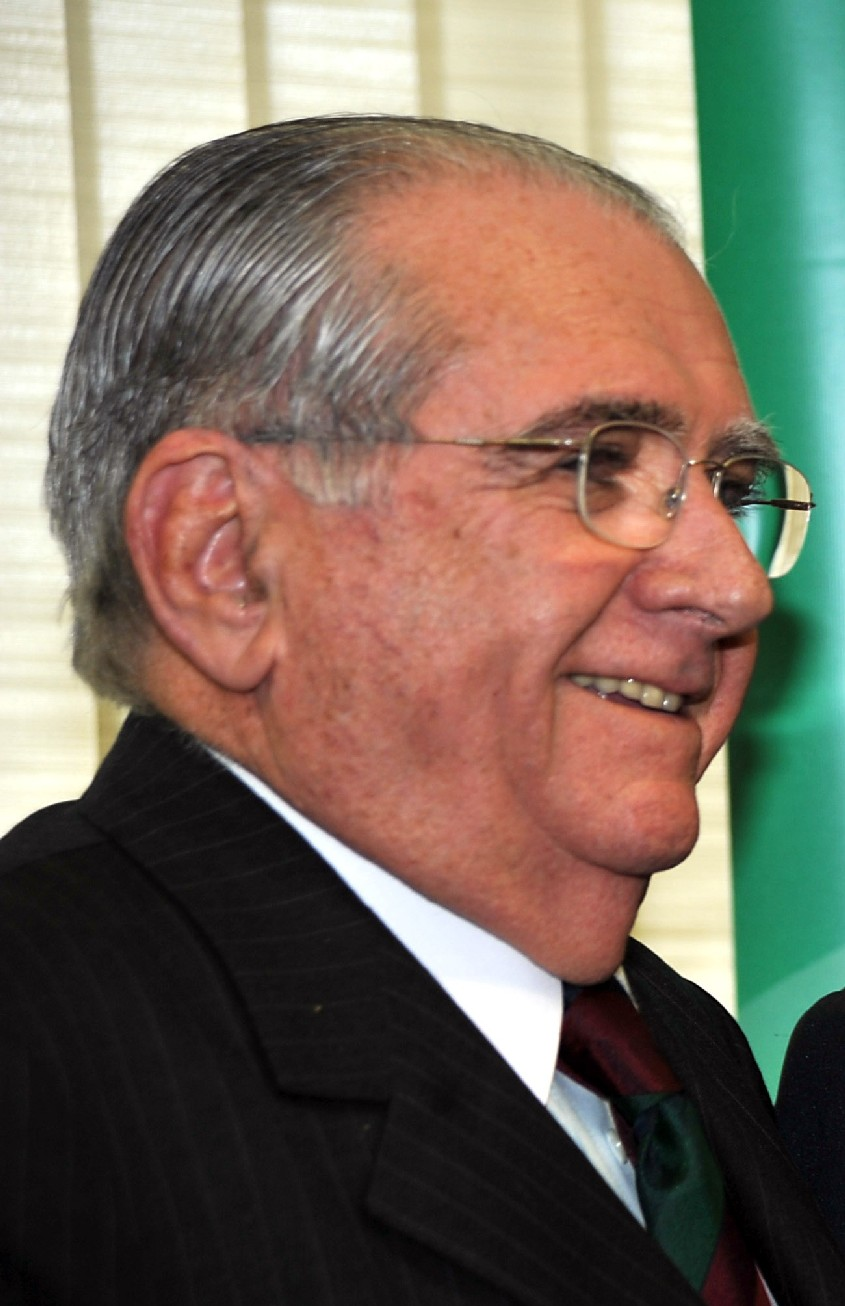
Candidate	Edison Lobão	João Castelo
Party	PFL	PRN
Running mate	Ribamar Fiquene; PFL	Ney Bello; PMDB
Popular vote	695,727	594,620
Percentage	53.92%	46.08%
Governor before election
João Alberto
PFL
Elected Governor
Edison Lobão
PFL

The Maranhão gubernatorial election of 1990 was held in the Brazilian state of Maranhão on October 3, alongside Brazil's general elections, with a second round on November 25. PFL candidate, Edison Lobão, was elected on November 25, 1990.

== Candidates ==
Governor	Running mate	Number	Coalition	Votes	%
João Castelo; PRN	Ildon Marques; PMDB	36	PRN, PMDB, PSDB, PSD, PDC, PDS, PL	595.392	45,75
Edison Lobão; PFL	Ribamar Fiquene; PFL	25	PFL, PSC, PTB, PRP	459.542	35,31
Conceição Andrade; PSB	Neudson Claudino; PT	40	PSB, PT, PDT, PCdoB, PCB	246.468	18,94

Governor	Running mate	Number	Coalition	Votes	%
Edison Lobão; PFL	Ribamar Fiquene; PFL	25	PFL, PSC, PTB, PRP, PCdoB, PCB, PT, PSB	695.727	56,92
João Castelo; PRN	Ney Bello; PMDB	36	PRN, PMDB, PSDB, PSD, PDS, PDC, PTR, PL, PDT, PMN, PCN, PRONA, PTdoB	594.620	43,08
