= Nice Lobão =

Brazilian politician

- Abdenice Lobão
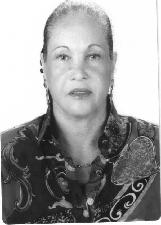

Federal Deputy for Maranhão
- In office February 1, 1999 – January 31, 2015

Secretary of Social Action of Maranhão
- In office March 15, 1991 – April 2, 1994 Serving with Governor: Edison Lobão

First Lady of Maranhão
- In office March 15, 1991 – April 2, 1994 Serving with Governor: Edison Lobão
- Preceded by: Maria Sousa
- Succeeded by: Zenira Fiquene

Personal details
- Born: October 29, 1936 Recife, Pernambuco, Brazil
- Party: PSD (2011–present)
- Other political affiliations: ARENA (1978–1980); PDS (1980–1985); PFL (1985–1996); PST (1996–1997); PFL (1997–2007); DEM (2007–2011)
- Spouse: Edison Lobão
- Occupation: Secretary of Social Action of Maranhão; First Lady of Maranhão

Abdenice Lobão (October 29, 1936) is a Brazilian politician affiliated with the Social Democratic Party (PSD).

== Biography ==
The daughter of Abdênago Rodrigues de Araújo and Anália Leôncia de Araújo, Abdenice was born in Recife, the capital of the state of Pernambuco, in 1936. She married Edison Lobão, a politician who was governor and senator for the state of Maranhão.

During her husband's administration, she served as Secretary of Social Action for the State of Maranhão from 1991 to 1994. Affiliated with the Liberal Front Party (PFL), she was elected federal deputy in Maranhão in 1998, receiving the third highest number of votes in the election. In 2002, she was re-elected to office after obtaining more than 80,000 votes. In 2006, she was re-elected to a third term after once again obtaining more than 80,000 votes. In 2010, she was elected to her fourth term after receiving more than 90,000 votes.

She became known as the author of Bill No. 73/1999, which proposes reserving 50% of places at public universities for students from public schools. The bill took 13 years to be signed into law, which was done by President Dilma Rousseff in 2012.

Over the past four years, the congresswoman has had the highest number of absences in the National Congress. Of the 422 sessions held during her last term, between February 2007 and December 2010, she was absent 240 times. In 2010, she was re-elected as a federal deputy for Maranhão. After completing her term, she did not run for political office again.

=== Historical election ===
Year	Position	Votes	Party	Result	Ref.
1998	Federal Representative for Maranhão	91.106	PFL	Elected	
2002	Federal Representative for Maranhão	82.812	PFL	Elected	
2006	Federal Representative for Maranhão	87.334	PFL	Elected	
2010	Federal Representative for Maranhão	95.129	DEM	Elected	
