= Ivaldo Rodrigues =

Brazilian politician (born 1974)

Municipal Secretary of Agriculture, Fisheries and Supply
- Incumbent
- Assumed office January 3, 2017

Alderman of São Luís
- In office January 1, 2009 – January 3, 2017

Personal details
- Born: Antônio Ivaldo Rodrigues; February 6, 1974 (age 52) Bequimão, MA
- Party: PDT (2003–present); PT (1986–2003)
- Profession: Politician

Antônio Ivaldo Rodrigues, better known as Ivaldo Rodrigues (born February 6, 1974) is a Brazilian politician. He is the municipal president of PDT (2012–present). Rodrigues was the alderman of São Luís (2009–2017). Rodrigues is a Municipal Secretary of Agriculture, Fisheries and Supply (2017–present).

== Political career ==
In 2004, Ivaldo Rodrigues ran for alderman of São Luís, without success.

In 2006, Ivaldo Rodrigues endorsed Jackson Lago and Lula.

In 2008, Ivaldo Rodrigues ran for alderman of São Luís, being elected. Endorsed João Castelo.

In 2010, Ivaldo Rodrigues endorsed Jackson Lago and Dilma Rousseff.

In 2012, Ivaldo Rodrigues was reelected alderman of São Luís. Endorsed Edivaldo Holanda Júnior.

In 2014, Ivaldo Rodrigues endorsed Flávio Dino and Dilma Rousseff.

In 2016, Ivaldo Rodrigues was reelected alderman of São Luís. Endorsed Edivaldo Holanda Júnior.
