= 2002 Maranhão gubernatorial election =

Maranhão gubernatorial election, 2002
← 1998	October 6, 2002	2006 →
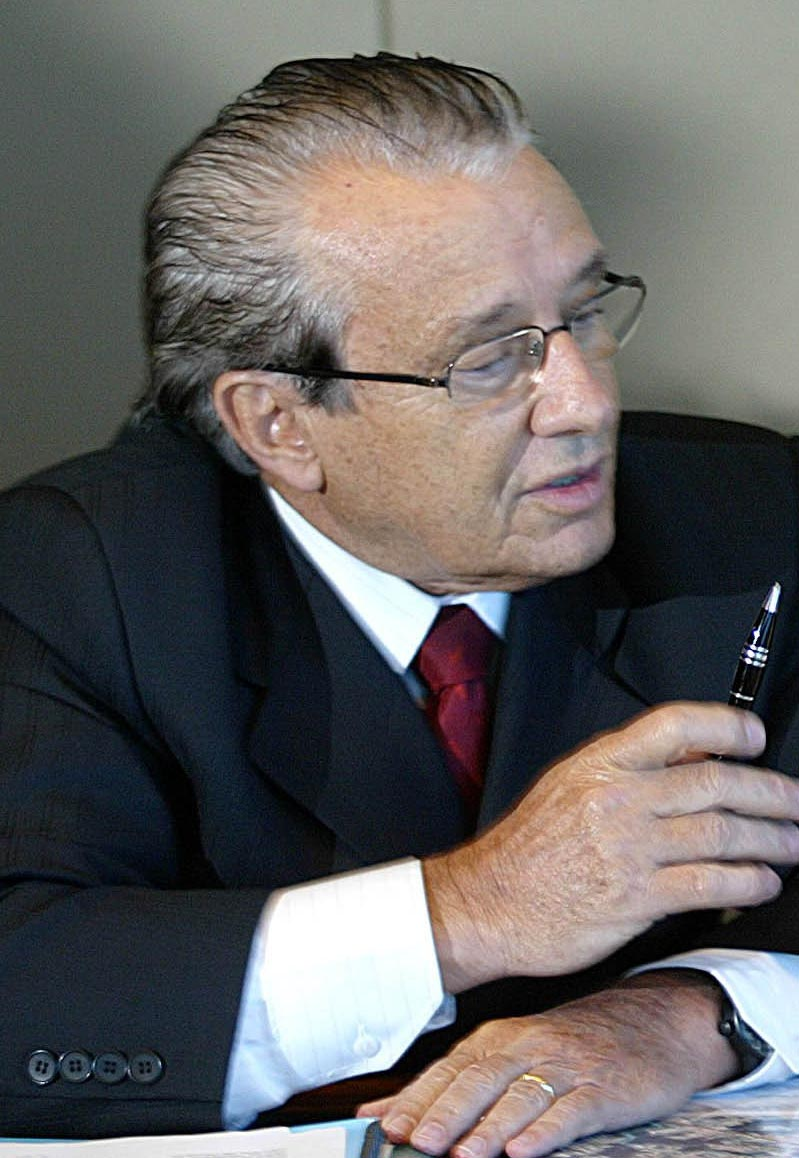

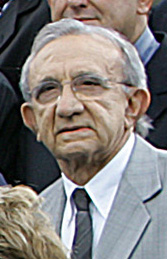
Candidate	José Reinaldo Tavares	Jackson Lago
Party	PFL	PDT
Running mate	Jura Filho; PMDB	Deoclides Macedo; PTB
Popular vote	1.076.893	896.930
Percentage	51,06%	42,52%
Governor before election
José Reinaldo
PFL
Elected Governor
José Reinaldo
PFL

The Maranhão gubernatorial election, 2002 was held in the Brazilian state of Maranhão on October 6, alongside Brazil's general elections. PFL candidate, José Reinaldo, was re-elected on October 6, 2002.

== Candidates ==
Governor	Running mate	Number	Coalition	Votes	%
Reinaldo; PFL	Jura Filho; PMDB	25	Maranhão goes ahead (PFL, PMDB, PL, PSD, PV, PSC, PST, PSDC)	1.076.893	51,06
Lago; PDT	Deoclides Macedo; PTB	12	Labour Front (PDT, PTB, PCdoB, PPS, PPB, PTN, PAN, PRTB, PSL, PHS, PRP)	896.930	42,52
Monteiro; PT	Uílio Silva; PT	13	Maranhão present (PT, PCB)	127.082	6,02
Marcos Silva; PSTU	Luiz Noleto; PSTU	16	PSTU	8.391	0,40
Roberto Rocha; PSDB	José Joaquim; PSDB	45	Maranhão decent (PSDB, PMN)	0	0,00
Murad; PSB	Iolanda Cortez; PSB	40	PSB	0	0,00
