= Astro de Ogum =

Brazilian politician (born 1957)

Alderman of São Luís
- Incumbent
- Assumed office January 1, 2001

Personal details
- Born: Generval Martiniano Moreira Leite; October 16, 1957 (age 68) São Luís, MA
- Party: PCdoB (2020–present); PL (2015–2020); PMN (2007–2015); CIDADANIA (2001–2007); AVANTE (1993–2001); PMDB (1986–1993); PFL (1985–1986); PDS (1980–1985)
- Profession: Holy father

Generval Martiniano Moreira Leite, better known as Astro de Ogum (born October 16, 1957) is a Brazilian politician. He is an alderman of São Luís and president of Municipal Chamber.

== Political career ==
In 1992, Astro de Ogum competed to alderman of São Luís, without success.

In 2000, Astro de Ogum was elected alderman of São Luís.

In 2002, Astro de Ogum endorsed Jackson Lago and Lula.

In 2004, Astro de Ogum was reelected alderman of São Luís. Endorsed Tadeu Palácio.

In 2006, Astro de Ogum endorsed Jackson Lago and Lula.

In 2008, Astro de Ogum was reelected alderman of São Luís. Endorsed João Castelo.

In 2010, Astro de Ogum endorsed Jackson Lago and José Serra.

In 2012, Astro de Ogum was reelected alderman of São Luís. Endorsed João Castelo.

In 2014, Astro de Ogum endorsed Lobão Filho and Aécio Neves.

In 2015, he became an ally of Flávio Dino when joining the Party of the Republic (PR).

In 2016, Astro de Ogum was reelected alderman of São Luís. Endorsed Edivaldo Holanda Júnior.
