= 1994 Maranhão gubernatorial election =

Maranhão gubernatorial election, 1994
← 1990	October 3, 1994; November 15, 1994	1998 →
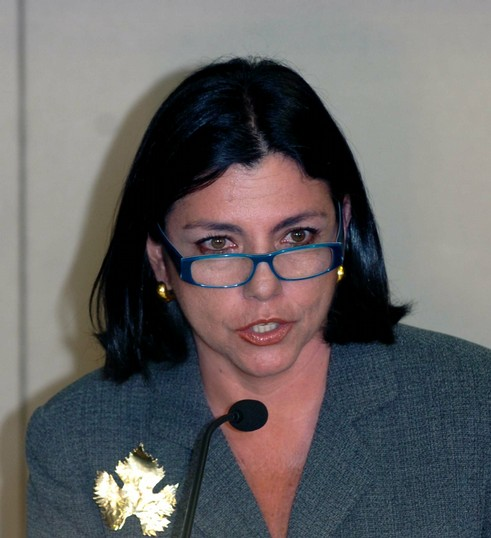

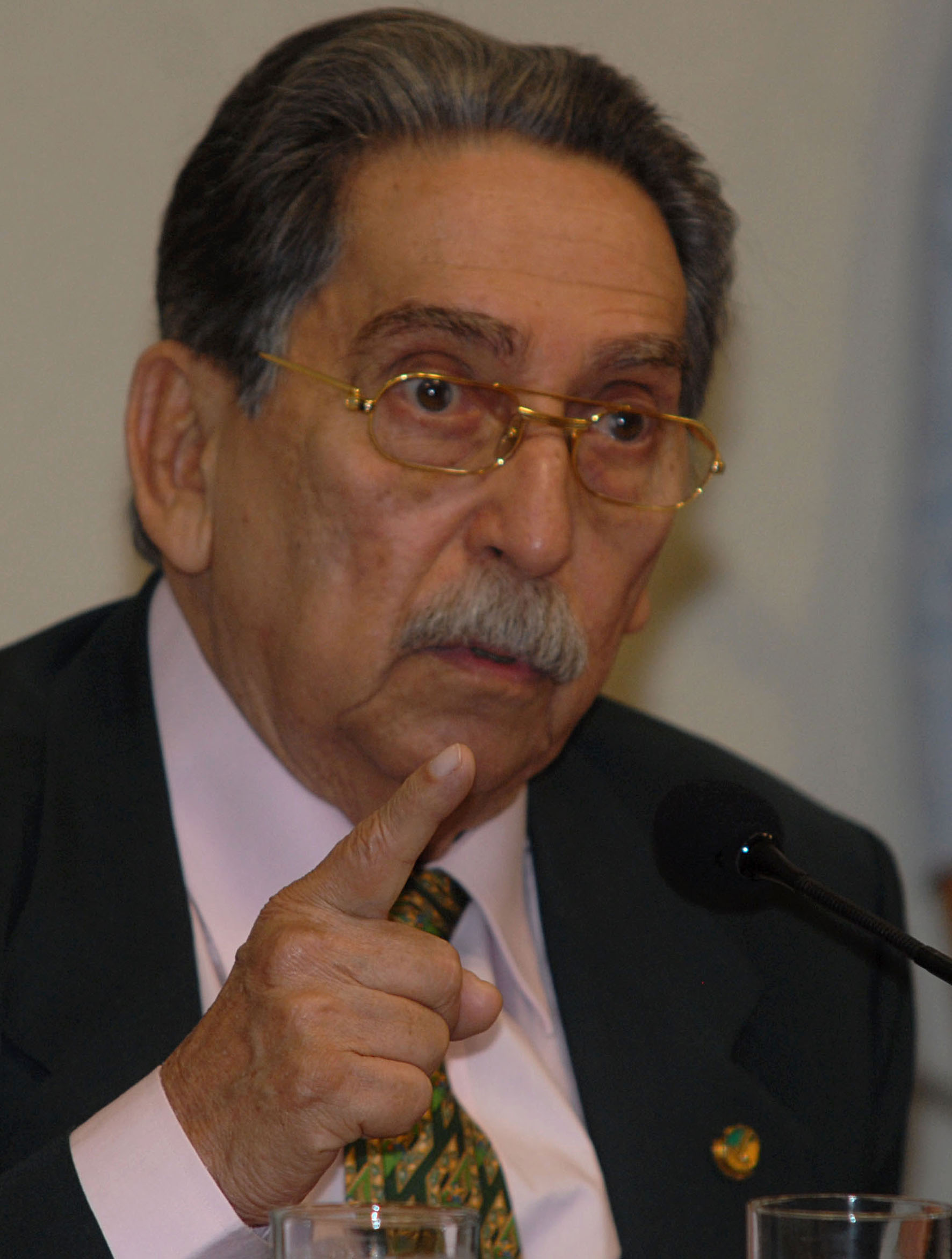
Candidate	Roseana Sarney	Epitácio Cafeteira
Party	PFL	PPR
Running mate	José Reinaldo Tavares; PFL	Juarez Medeiros; PSB
Popular vote	753.901	735.841
Percentage	50,61%	49,39%
Governor before election
Ribamar Fiquene
PFL
Elected Governor
Roseana Sarney
PFL

The Maranhão gubernatorial election of 1994 was held in the Brazilian state of Maranhão on October 3, alongside Brazil's general elections, with a second round on November 16. Liberal Front Party (PFL) candidate Roseana Sarney was elected on November 16, 1994.
