= 1998 Maranhão gubernatorial election =

Maranhão gubernatorial election, 1998
← 1994	October 4, 1998	2002 →
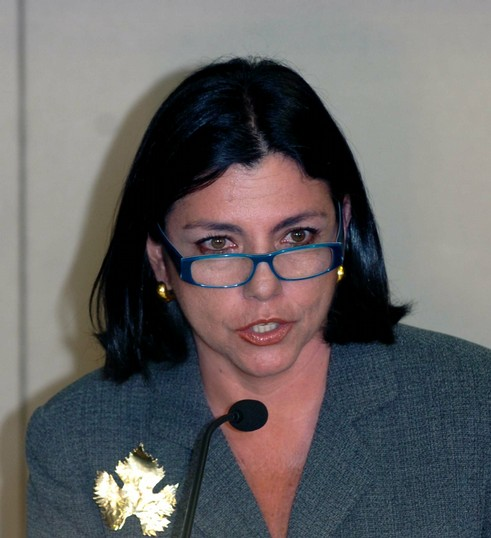

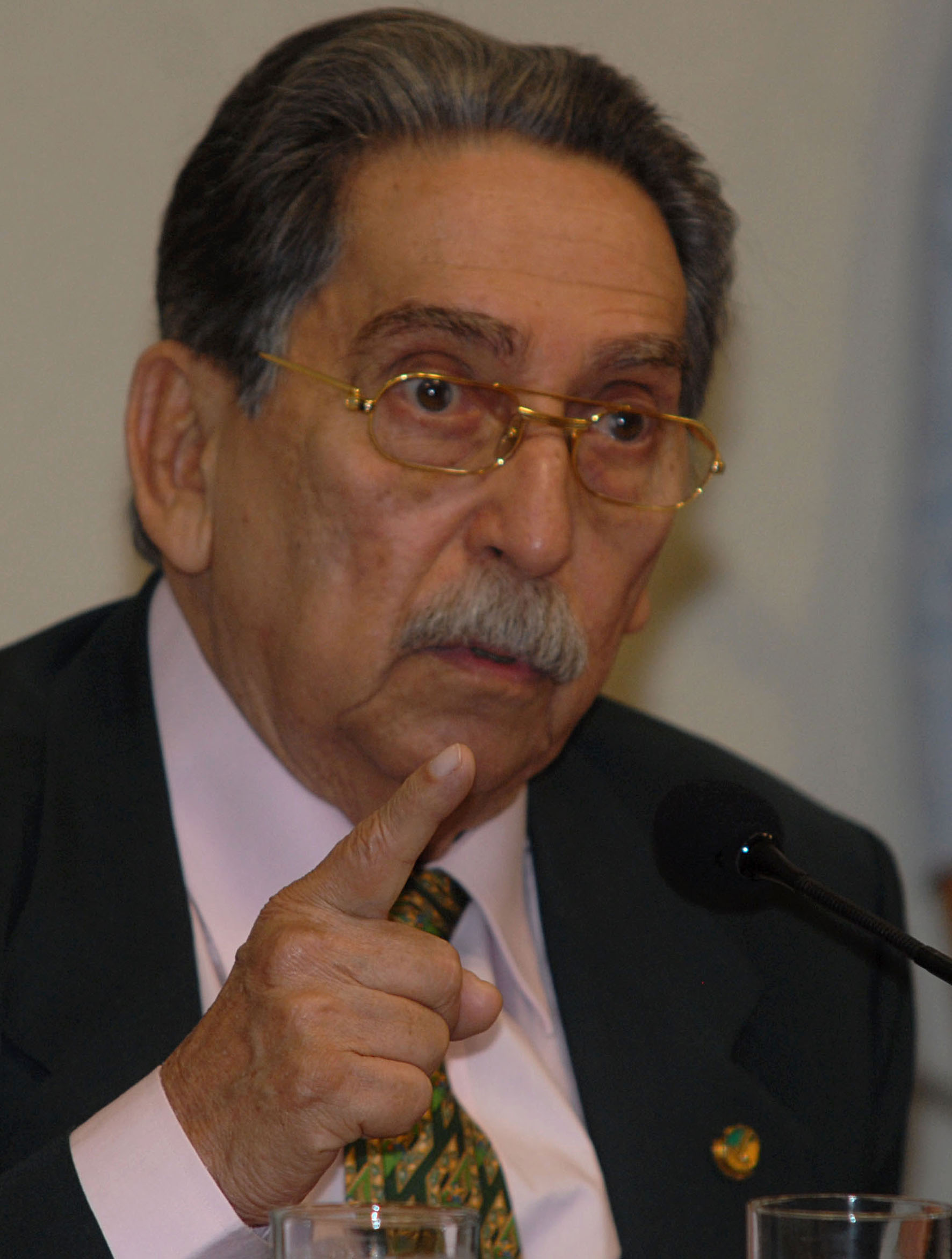
Candidate	Roseana Sarney	Epitácio Cafeteira
Party	PFL	PP
Running mate	José Reinaldo Tavares; PFL	Clay Lago; PDT
Popular vote	1.005.755	401.578
Percentage	66,01%	26,36%
Governor before election
Roseana Sarney
PFL
Elected Governor
Roseana Sarney
PFL

The Maranhão gubernatorial election of 1998 was held in the Brazilian state of Maranhão on October 4, alongside Brazil's general elections. PFL candidate, Roseana Sarney, was re-elected on October 4, 1998.
