= Gordo a Go-Go =

- Presented by: João Gordo
- Opening theme: I Like Chopin
- Country of origin: Brazil
- Original language: Portuguese

Original release
- Network: MTV Brasil
- Release: July 2000 – December 2005

Gordo a Go-Go It was an MTV Brasil television program that aired from July 2000 to December 2005, hosted by the musician João Gordo. The show followed a talk show format and was a major ratings hit at the time.

== Production ==
In the first season in 2000, the show featured make-up artist and presenter Max Fivelinha, who produced on-location segments and provided commentary for the program.

== Controversy ==
In 2003, João Gordo and actor-singer Dado Dolabella got into a argument during the filming of the program. The two exchanged profanities, and physical violence nearly broke out on both sides. In 2006, the host criticized MTV, which had posted the video of the argument on MTV Overdrive, a site launched that year.

== Cast ==
The guests who appeared on the program include: Sérgio Mallandro, Lobão, Padre Marcelo Rossi, Cássia Eller, Chorão, Marisa Orth, Ciro Gomes. and the bands, Garotos Podres, Matanza, Ultraje a Rigor, Detonautas, Roque Clube, Boom Boom Kid.
