= Allan Garcês =

Brazilian doctor and politician (born 1969)

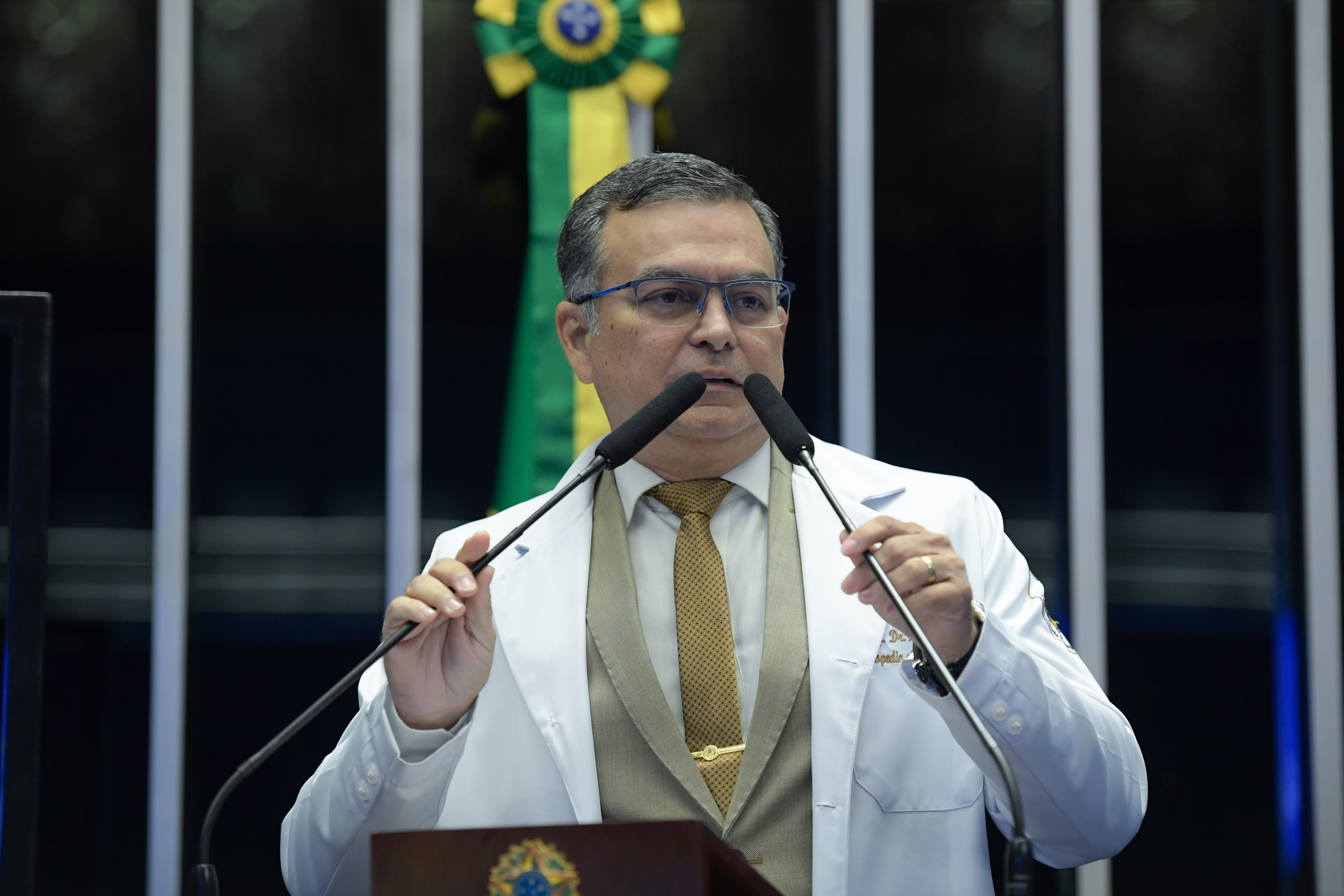

Personal details
- Born: Allan Quadros Garcês; August 30, 1969 (age 56) Belém, PA
- Party: PSL (2018–present); PMB (2015–2018); PSDB (1988–2015)
- Profession: Doctor

Allan Quadros Garcês, better known as Allan Garcês (born August 30, 1969) is a Brazilian doctor and politician. He is married to Kelly Cris Santos.

== Political career ==
- In 2010, Allan Garcês endorsed Jackson Lago and José Serra.
- In 2012, Allan Garcês ran for councilman of São Luís, without success. Endorsed João Castelo.
- In 2014, Allan Garcês endorsed Aécio Neves.
- In 2016, Allan Garcês ran for alderman of São Luís, without success. Endorsed Eduardo Braide.

== Impeachment of Dilma Rousseff ==
Garcês was responsible for convening demonstrators for the departure of president Dilma Rousseff. Garcês is the Come to the Street movement.
