= List of governors of Maranhão =

This is the list of governors of Maranhão.

== Military Regime ==
#	Photo	Name	Took office	Left office	Party	Notes
47	none available	Newton de Barros Belo	January 31, 1961	January 31, 1966	PSD	Elected governor.
48		José Sarney	January 31, 1966	May 14, 1970	ARENA	Elected governor.
—		Antônio Jorge Dino	May 14, 1970	March 15, 1971	ARENA	Acting governor.
49	none available	Pedro Neiva de Santana	March 15, 1971	March 15, 1975	ARENA	Appointed governor.
—	none available	José Murad	March 15, 1975	March 31, 1975	ARENA	Acting governor.
50	none available	Oswaldo da Costa Nunes Freire	March 31, 1975	March 15, 1979	ARENA	Appointed governor.
51		João Castelo	March 15, 1979	May 14, 1982	ARENA	Appointed governor.
52	none available	Ivar Saldanha	May 14, 1982	March 15, 1983	PDS	Acting governor.
53		Luís Rocha	March 15, 1983	March 15, 1987	PDS	Elected governor after military coup.

== New Republic ==
#	Photo	Name	Took office	Left office	Party	Notes
54		Epitácio Cafeteira	March 15, 1987	April 3, 1990	PMDB/PDC	Elected governor.
55		João Alberto de Souza	April 3, 1990	March 15, 1991	PFL	Elected as vice governor.
56		Edison Lobão	March 15, 1991	April 2, 1994	PFL	Elected governor.
57	none available	José de Ribamar Fiquene	April 2, 1994	January 1, 1995	PFL	Elected as vice governor.
58		Roseana Sarney	January 1, 1995	April 5, 2002	PFL	Re-elected governor.
59		José Reinaldo Tavares	April 5, 2002	January 1, 2007	PFL/PTB/PSB	Re-elected governor.
60		Jackson Lago	January 1, 2007	April 18, 2009	PDT	Elected governor.
61		Roseana Sarney	April 17, 2009	December 10, 2014	PMDB	Re-elected governor.
–	none available	Arnaldo Melo	December 10, 2014	January 1, 2015	PMDB	Acting governor.
62		Flávio Dino	January 1, 2015	April 2, 2022	PCdoB/PSB	Elected governor.
63		Carlos Brandão	April 2, 2022	present	PSB	Elected as vice governor.
