= Luís Rocha (politician) =

Brazilian politician and lawyer

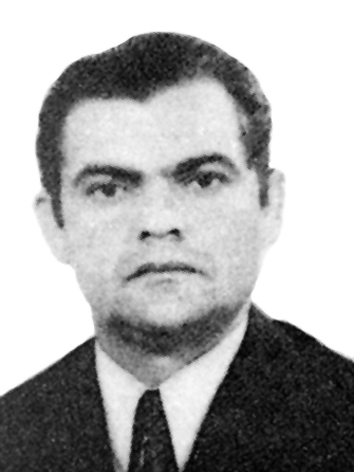

Governor of Maranhão
- In office March 15, 1983 – March 15, 1987
- Preceded by: Ivar Saldanha
- Succeeded by: Epitácio Cafeteira

Personal details
- Born: Luís Alves Coelho Rocha; July 6, 1937 Loreto, Maranhão
- Died: March 8, 2001 (aged 63)
- Party: PSDB
- Spouse: Terezinha Rocha
- Children: Luís Rocha Filho; Roberto Rocha; Cintya Rocha
- Profession: Lawyer; Politician

Luís Alves Coelho Rocha (July 6, 1937 – March 8, 2001) was a Brazilian politician, lawyer and his founder from TV Açucena. He was born in Loreto, and was married to Terezinha Rocha, with whom he had two children, Luís Rocha Filho and Roberto Rocha. He was a federal deputy in the Chamber of Deputies between 1975 and 1983. He served as governor of Maranhão, from 1983 to 1986. Rocha died in São Luís on March 8, 2001.
