= Moacir Feitosa =

Brazilian teacher and politician

Municipal Secretary of Education of São Luís
- Incumbent
- Assumed office February 17, 2016
- In office January 1, 2009 – March 31, 2010

Personal details
- Born: Raimundo Moacir Mendes Feitosa; January 9, 1950 (age 76) Teresina, PI
- Party: PTC
- Profession: Teacher

Raimundo Moacir Mendes Feitosa (born January 9, 1950, in Teresina) is a Brazilian teacher and politician. He was president of the PDT in São Luís (1980–2013). Feitosa is a municipal secretary of São Luís, also was secretary of João Castelo until 2010 when he left office.
