= Malta, Paraíba =

Coordinates: 6°54′S 37°31′W

Malta
- Municipality
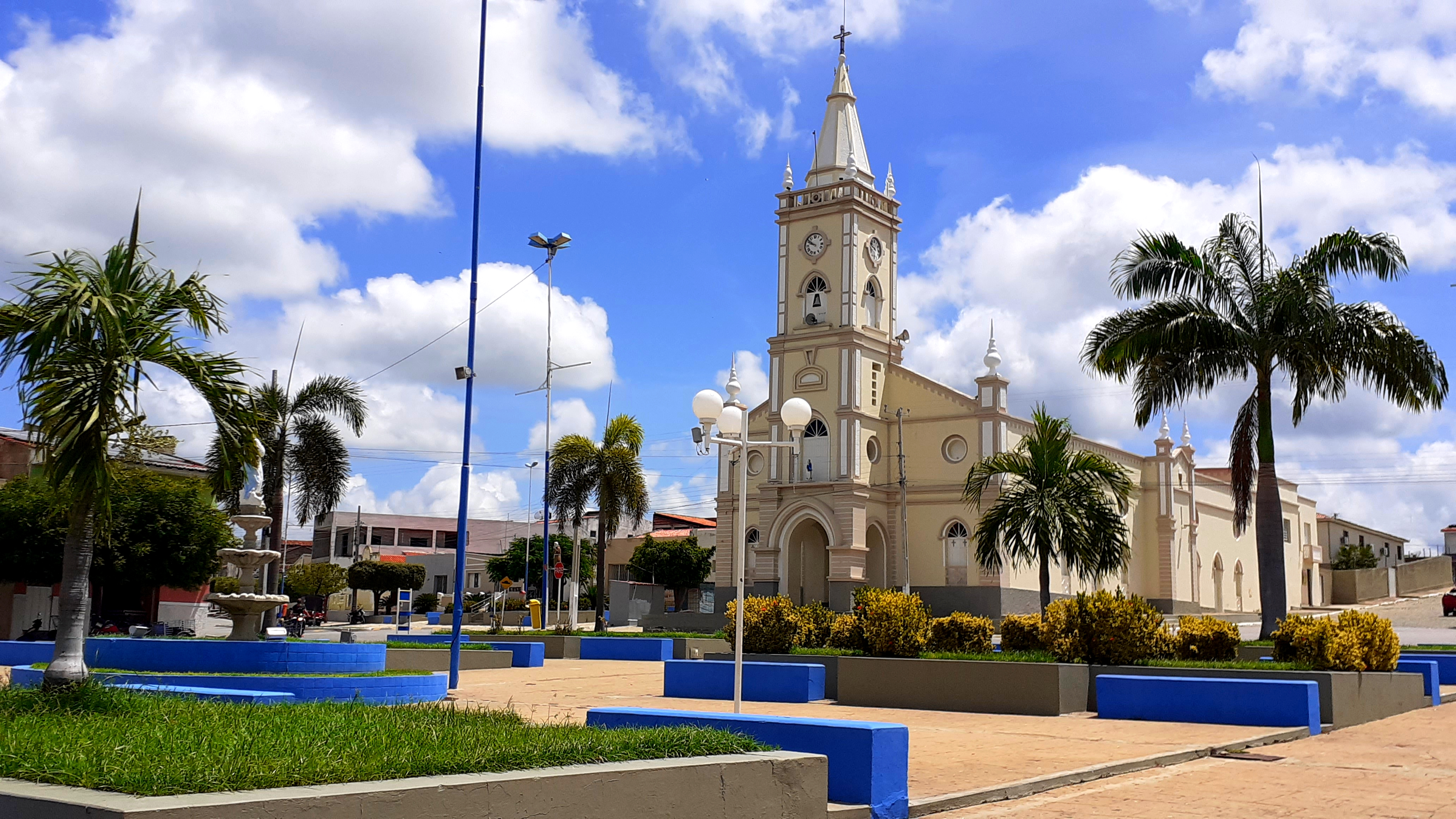
- View of Malta

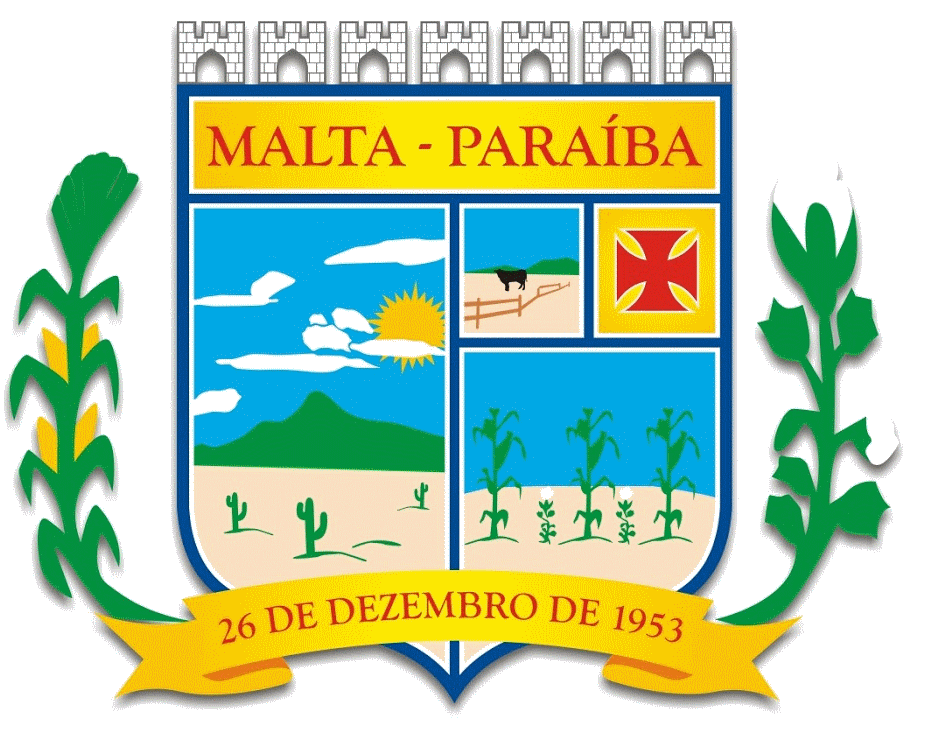
- Flag Coat of arms

- Malta within Paraíba
- Country: Brazil
- Region: Northeast
- State: Paraíba
- Mesoregion: Sertao Paraibana

Area
  - Total: 66.41 sq mi (172.01 km^{2})

Population (2022)
  - Total: 6,046
- Time zone: UTC−3 (BRT)

Malta is a municipality in the state of Paraíba in the Northeast Region of Brazil. It is part of the Metropolitan Region of Patos. The population is 6,046 (2022 census) in an area of 172.01 km². The town is at an altitude of 257 m. Malta is linked with the Trans-Amazonian Highway.

== Overview ==
The name comes from the Portuguese freguesia of Malta, in Vila do Conde.

It ranks 12th by HDI among Paraiban municipalities; 4th in greater Patos. The per capita income for the municipality is R$ 12,683.28 (2020). The city is the seat of the Santuário do Divino Pai Eterno, the major sanctuary in the state.

== History ==
At the end of the 17th century, the Captain Teodósio de Oliveira Ledo led a group of Pêgas Indians to settle the land and begin farming.

The founding of Malta is credited to João Fernandes de Freitas, who built a chapel in 1830 in honor of Immaculate Conception and developed the core that later would be the village and then the town of Malta. The fertile soil, attracted many livestock farmers, who organized farms both for creation and for the cultivation of cotton.

== Geography ==
Malta is located on a depression that is surrounded by the Serra do Pico (Portuguese for Pico ridge) to the north and Serra Macapá (Macapá ridge) to the south, part of the vast region known as the Depressão sertaneja, with an average elevation of around 350 meters (1,148 ft) above sea level – though at a distance of about 220 kilometers (136 mi) from the Atlantic Ocean (at Macau, Rio Grande do Norte). Neighbouring municipalities are Vista Serrana (North), São José de Espinharas (Northeast), Patos (East), Santa Teresinha and Catingueira (South) and Condado (West).

=== Climate ===
The town of Malta experiences a tropical wet and dry climate with a short rainy season (Koppen Aw) from February to April. During this period when the equatorial rainband associated with the highly seasonalized positioning of the Intertropical Convergence Zone is over the city, warm to hot temperatures and abundant equatorial rainfall prevail. Conversely, the dry season dominates the remaining majority of the year, with abundant sunshine prevalent from May to January. The wettest month is March with an average monthly total of 215.9 mm (8.50 in) of precipitation, while the driest month is August with an average total of average precipitation total of 2.3 mm (0.09 in).

Climate data for Malta, Paraíba (1961–1990)
Month	Jan	Feb	Mar	Apr	May	Jun	Jul	Aug	Sep	Oct	Nov	Dec	Year
Mean daily maximum °C (°F)	33.7 (92.7)	32.8 (91.0)	32.0 (89.6)	31.5 (88.7)	30.8 (87.4)	30.1 (86.2)	30.2 (86.4)	31.7 (89.1)	33.1 (91.6)	34.3 (93.7)	34.7 (94.5)	34.5 (94.1)	32.5 (90.5)
Daily mean °C (°F)	26.7 (80.1)	26.1 (79.0)	25.6 (78.1)	25.4 (77.7)	24.8 (76.6)	24.0 (75.2)	23.9 (75.0)	24.5 (76.1)	25.5 (77.9)	26.4 (79.5)	26.8 (80.2)	27.0 (80.6)	25.6 (78.1)
Mean daily minimum °C (°F)	21.5 (70.7)	21.3 (70.3)	21.1 (70.0)	20.8 (69.4)	20.2 (68.4)	19.3 (66.7)	18.6 (65.5)	18.6 (65.5)	19.7 (67.5)	20.5 (68.9)	21.1 (70.0)	21.5 (70.7)	20.4 (68.7)
Average rainfall mm (inches)	65.3 (2.57)	121.4 (4.78)	215.9 (8.50)	177.3 (6.98)	62.7 (2.47)	28.9 (1.14)	15.0 (0.59)	2.3 (0.09)	2.9 (0.11)	6.3 (0.25)	10.6 (0.42)	18.8 (0.74)	727.5 (28.64)
Source: Departamento de Ciências Atmosféricas da UFCG.

== Demographics ==
Religion in Malta (2010)
1. Roman Catholic (Note: does not include the Brazilian Catholic Apostolic Church which broke away from Rome in 1945) (89.8%)
2. Assemblies of God (Note: This is the largest Pentecostal group in Malta) (3.47%)
3. Traditional/Mainline Protestant (Note: Includes Lutheran, Presbyterian, Baptist, Adventist, Methodist, and Congregational churches) (1.50%)
4. Christian Congregation of Brazil (Note: This is the second largest Pentecostal group in Malta) (0.52%)
5. Other Pentecostal (1.27%)
6. Other Christian (Note: Includes the Jehovah's Witnesses, Brazilian Catholic Apostolic Church, Latter-day Saints, and Orthodox Church) (0.50%)
7. Spiritism (0.04%)
8. Other religions (Note: Includes Umbanda and Candomblé, Judaism, Islam, and various Eastern religions) (0.00%)
9. No religion (Note: Includes atheists and agnostics) (2.94%)

Malta's population (Maltenses) is made up of two main ethnic groups: Europeans (mainly Portuguese), and Africans.

Roman Catholic and Protestant are the dominant religions in Malta. Data from a 2010 census on religious affiliation indicates that approximately 97 percent of the population is Christian. The composition of the maltense population is:

- Roman Catholicism, 89.76%
- Pentecostal, 5.26%
- Protestan, 1.50% and
- no religion, 2.94%.

=== Race ===
Race and ethnicity in Malta
Ethnicity	Percentage
Pardo (Multiracial)	53.8%
White	40.0%
Black	5.6%
Asian	0.6%
Amerindian	0.0%

The census found 3,017 Pardo (multiracial) people (53.8%), 2,247 White people (40.0%), 313 Black people (5.6%) and 32 Asian people (0.6%).

=== Age structure ===
0–14 years: 26.1% (total 1478)
15–64 years: 57.6% (total 3215)
60 years and over: 16.3% (total 920) (2010 census).

== Economics ==
The service sector is the largest component of Malta GDP at 67 percent, followed by the industrial sector at 21 percent. Agriculture represents 12 percent of GDP (2012).

=== Power plants ===
There are two solar parks in development in the town. When finished, it will be the Paraíba's largest solar power park. It has allotted 60 MW of solar power capacity to 2 solar project developers, the Usina Fotovoltaica Malta and the Usina Fotovoltaica Angicos I. This is expected to bring in investments of R$300 million.

== See also ==
- List of municipalities in Paraíba
