= 2010 Maranhão gubernatorial election =

- October 3, 2010
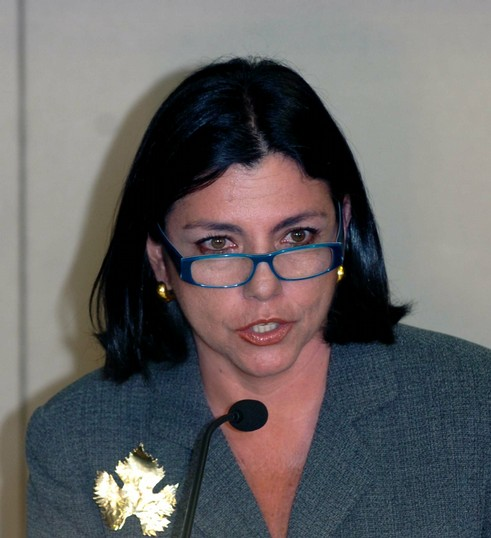

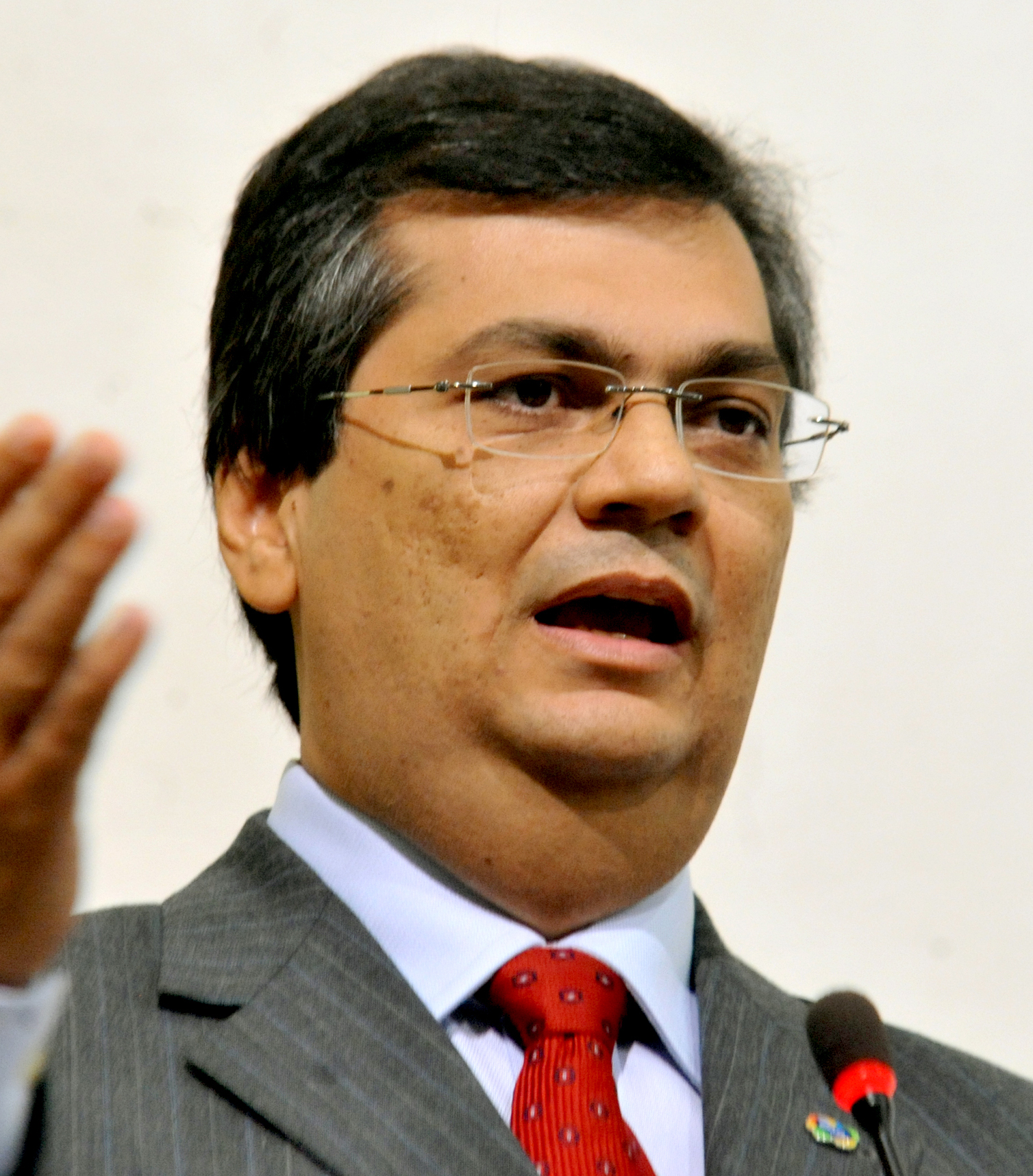

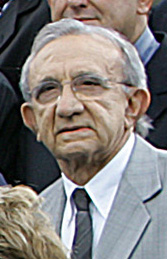
Nominee	Roseana Sarney (inc.)	Flávio Dino	Jackson Lago
Party	MDB	PCdoB	PDT
Running mate	Washington Luiz de Oliveira	Miosótis Lúcio	Luiz Carlos Porto
Popular vote	1,459,792	859,402	569,412
Percentage	50.08%	29.49%	19.54%
Governor before election
Roseana Sarney
MDB
Elected Governor
Roseana Sarney
MDB

The Maranhão gubernatorial election was held on October 3, 2010, to elect the next governor of Maranhão. Incumbent Governor Roseana Sarney was reelected for a second term.

== Candidates ==
Candidate	Running mate	Coalition
Jackson; PDT	Luiz Carlos Porto; PSDB	"O Povo é Maior" (PDT, PSDB, PTC)
Roseana; PMDB	Washington Luiz de Oliveira; PT	"O Maranhão Não Pode Parar" (PMDB, PT, PRB, PP, PTB, PSL, PTN, PSC, PR, DEM, PRTB, PMN, PV, PRP, PTdoB, PHS)
Marcos Silva; PSTU	Hertz Dias; PSTU	-
Josivaldo; PCB	Joselita; PCB	-
Saulo; PSOL	Cleumir; PSOL	-
Dino; PCdoB	Miosótis; PPS	"Muda Maranhão" (PCdoB, PPS, PSB)

== Election results ==
Maranhão Gubernatorial Election
Party	Candidate	Votes	%	±%
MDB	Roseana Sarney (incumbent)	1,459,792	50.08%	
PCdoB	Flávio Dino	859,402	29.49%	
PDT	Jackson Lago	569,412	19.54%	
PSTU	Marcos Silva	14,685	0.5%	
PSOL	Saulo Arcangeli	8,898	0.31%	
PCB	Josivaldo Corrêa	2,518	0.09%	
Majority		600,390	20.59%	
MDB hold		Swing		
