= Márcio Jardim =

Brazilian teacher and politician

Secretary of Sports and Leisure from Maranhão
- In office 1 January 2015 – 14 October 2017

Personal details
- Born: Márcio Batalha Jardim; March 25, 1974 (age 52) Arari, MA
- Party: PT (2000–present); PDT (1990–2000)
- Profession: Teacher

Márcio Batalha Jardim (born 25 March 1974) is a Brazilian teacher and politician. He was vice-president of National Union of Students (1997–2000). Jardim served as secretary of Sports and Leisure in Maranhão (2015–2017).

== Political career ==
Jardim appeared in politics when he was elected vice-president of National Union of Students (UNE) in 1997.

In 2002, Jardim ran for federal deputy, without success. Endorsed Jackson Lago and Lula.

In 2006, Jardim endorsed Jackson Lago and Lula.

In 2010, Jardim endorsed Flávio Dino and Dilma Rousseff.

In 2014, Jardim endorsed Flávio Dino and Dilma Rousseff.
