= Lobão =

Lobão may refer to:

== People ==
- Lobão (footballer), Brazilian former footballer Fabrício Almeida Carvalho (born 1972)
- Edison Lobão, Brazilian politician, former governor of the state of Maranhão and former minister of mines and energy (born 1936)
- Nice Lobão, Brazilian politician, former deputy of the state of Maranhão (born 1936)
- Rodrigo Lobão or simply Lobão, Brazilian footballer Rodrigo da Conceição Santos (born 1993)
- Lobão (musician), Brazilian singer-songwriter, composer, musician, writer, publisher, television host João Luiz Woerdenbag Filho (born 1957)

== Other uses ==
- Lobão (Santa Maria da Feira), Portugal, a former civil parish
- Lobão, a synonym of the Tinta Carvalha, a Portuguese wine grape variety
