= List of mayors of São Luís, Maranhão =

The following is a list of mayors of the city of São Luís, in Maranhão state, Brazil.

- Joaquim Sousândrade, 1890-1891
- Alexandre Collares Jr, 1891-1892, 1897-1901, 1906-1909
- José Rodrigues Fernandes, 1892-1897
- Nuno Álvares de Pinho, 1901-1905
- Afonso Henrique de Pinho, 1905-1906
- Raul da Cunha Machado, 1909-1910
- Mariano Martins Lisboa Neto, 1910-1912
- Benedito Pereira Leite, 1912-1916
- Afonso Giffening de Matos, 1916
- Clodomir Cardoso, 1916-1919
- José Luso Torres, 1919-1922
- Raimundo Gonçalves da Silva, 1922
- Antônio Brício de Araújo, 1922-1927
- Euclides Zenóbio da Costa, 1927
- Jayme Tavares, 1927-1930
- Basílio Torreão Franco de Sá, 1930
- Lino Machado, 1930
- Antonio Carlos Teixeira Leite, 1930-1931
- Carlos dos Reis Macieira, 1931
- João Manuel Gomes Tinoco, 1931
- Raimundo Frazão Cantanhede, 1931
- João Inácio Martins, 1931
- Demerval Rosa, 1931-1933
- Alcides Jansen Serra Lima Pereira, 1933
- Pedro José de Oliveira, 1933-1934
- Antônio Alexandre Bayma, 1934-1935
- Manoel Vieira de Azevedo, 1935-1936
- José Otacílio Saboia Ribeiro, 1936-1937
- Clodoaldo Cardoso, 1937
- Pedro Santana, 1937-1945
- Renato Archer, 1945-1948
- Antonio Euzébio da Costa Rodrigues, 1948-1951
- Edson Brandão, 1951
- Alexandre Costa, 1951-1953
- Eduardo Viana Pereira, 1953-1954
- Orfila Cardoso Nunes, 1954-1955
- Ivar Saldanha, 1955-1956, 1959-1962, 1978
- Emiliano dos Reis Macieira, 1956-1959
- Ruy Ribeiro Mesquita, 1962-1963
- Djard Ramos Martins, 1963-1966
- Epitácio Cafeteira, 1966-1969
- Vicente Fialho, 1969-1970
- José Ateniense Libério, 1970-1971
- Haroldo Tavares, 1971-1975
- Antônio Bayma Jr, 1975-1978
- Lia Varella, 1978-1979
- Lereno Nunes, 1979
- Mauro Fecury, 1979-1980, 1983-1985
- Roberto Macieira, 1980-1983
- Gardênia Gonçalves, 1986-1988
- Jackson Lago, 1989-1992, 1997-2002
- Conceição Andrade, 1993-1996
- Tadeu Palácio, 2002-2008
- João Castelo, 2009-2012
- Edivaldo Holanda Jr, 2013-2021
- Eduardo Braide, 2021-2026
- Esmênia Miranda, 2026-present

== See also ==
- Câmara Municipal de São Luís (city council)
- São Luís, Maranhão municipal election, 2016
- List of mayors of largest cities in Brazil (in Portuguese)
- List of mayors of capitals of Brazil (in Portuguese)
