= Ildon Marques =

Brazilian businessman and politician

Federal deputy from Maranhão
- In office June 21, 2016 – October 19, 2016

Mayor of Imperatriz
- In office January 1, 2005 – December 31, 2008
- In office January 1, 1997 – January 1, 2005
- In office January 3, 1995 – April 4, 1996

Senator from Maranhão
- In office December 17, 2004 – December 31, 2004

Vice-Mayor of Imperatriz
- In office March 15, 1983 – January 1, 1989

Personal details
- Born: Ildon Marques de Souza; October 20, 1945 (age 80) Malta, PB
- Party: PP (2018-present)
- Other political affiliations: PSB (2016-2018); PMN (2013-2016); MDB(2011-2013); DEM (2009-2011); MDB (1993-2009); PTC (1989-1993); PFL (1987-1989); PDS (1980-1987); ARENA (1970-1980)
- Profession: Businessman

Ildon Marques de Souza (born October 20, 1945) is a Brazilian businessman and politician. He was vice-mayor, mayor of Imperatriz and senator.
