= Alexia Brito =

Brazilian influencer

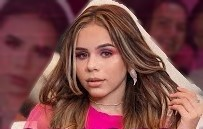
- Born: January 4, 2005 (age 21); Bacabal, Maranhão, Brazil
- Other name: Bota Pó
- Occupation: Digital influencer

Alexia Brito (born in Bacabal on January 4, 2005), better known by the artistic name Bota Pó, is an influencer, makeup artist, and comedian. She produces content in the field of makeup as well as material related to the LGBTQ movement, specially the transgender cause.

== Career ==
She gained prominence on the internet by creating content on social media platforms and garnered attention when she announced her gender transition at the age of 17, receiving support from various celebrities.

In 2021, she was invited by the Government of the State of Maranhão to star in the television campaign for the launch of the Gonçalves Dias Education Platform. Due to the aired advertisement, Bota Pó became the target of homophobic attacks from the Maranhão senator Roberto Rocha (PSDB), who claimed that the campaign was promoting "homosexuality advocacy".
