= Matanza de los Oteros =

Municipality in León, Spain

Coordinates: 42°14′N 5°23′W

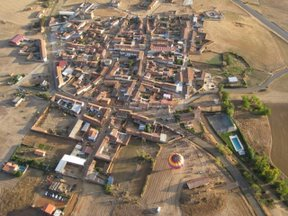
Aerial view of Matanza de los Oteros municipal

Flag of Matanza de los Oteros municipality

Coat of arms of Matanza de los Oteros municipality

Matanza de los Oteros is a municipality in the province of León, Castile and León, Spain. It has an area of 20.69 mi^{2} (53,58 km²) with a population of 179, as of 2017. It is about 28.58 mi (46 km) south of the Leonese capital, León.

== Geography ==
Matanza de los Oteros is roughly 0.51 mi (825 m) above sea level. The hamlet rests on the Leonese cereal plateau in the region of Oteros del Rey. A generally flat land, this plain is only broken up by hillocks and buttes scattered throughout the area. Between these hills are many thalwegs creating small valleys which provide more humid areas between the large plains.

The Raneros stream is an important source of water in the area. This is a tributary of the Cea river and runs through the Toro valley.

This municipality is included in the protected areas of the Oteros-Campos ZEPA (Zona de especial protección para las aves; Special Protection Zone for Birds) and the Lagunas de los Oteros LIC (Lugares de importancia comunitaria; Site of Community Importance)

== History ==
The history of this municipality is obscure before the reign of Alfonso III of Asturias. During his reign, this area was repopulated by Asturians, Franks, and Mozarabs alike. The etymology of the site originates from an alleged battle that took place in the area. In 878, the Emir of Córdoba, Muhammad I, raised an army to invade the Kingdom of León. Alfonso III met him in battle in what is today known as Santa Cristina de la Polvorosa where Muhammad I was defeated. The Cordoban army went into a rout and the victorious Asturians gave chase; the ensuing massacre was so great that the plain was named the Slaughter of the Hills (Matanza de los Oteros). Scholars are dubious of this claim, noting that it may simply be a corruption of the name mata ancha (broad bushes) into matanza (slaughter).
