= São José de Espinharas =

Coordinates: 6°50′49″S 37°19′33″W

St. Joseph Espinharas São José de Espinharas
- Municipality
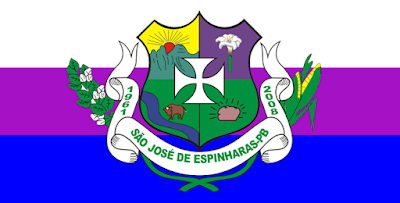
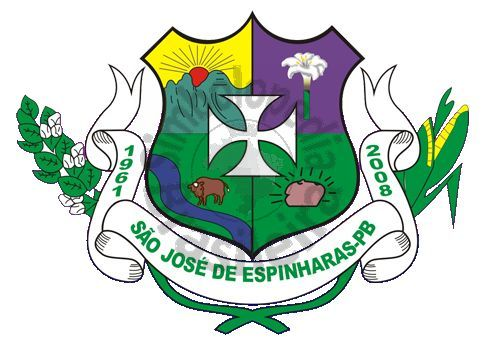
- Flag Coat of arms

- Country: Brazil
- Region: Northeast
- State: Paraíba
- Mesoregion: Sertao Paraibana
- Microregion: Patos

Government
  - mayor: Ricardo Vilar Wanderley Nobrega

Area
  - Total: 763 km^{2} (295 sq mi)

Population (2020)
  - Total: 4,656
- Approx. 50% live in rural areas
- Time zone: UTC−3 (BRT)

São José de Espinharas is a town in the state of Paraíba, Northeastern Brazil.

Located on the banks of the lower Espinharas River, about 30 km to the North of Patos, this small town has its economy based on extensive cattle and goat raising and subsistence agriculture. Its relief is somewhat irregular, with large igneous rock outcrops and small mountains and granite inselbergs. The soil is generally poor ("tabuleiros") and covered by the caatinga vegetation, interspersed with small valleys ("baixios") with fertile soils that support agricultural activities and are propitious to the building of small and medium-sized dams that store rain-water flowing in temporary creeks. The natural vegetation on the "tabuleiros" is well preserved as of 2005.

Once a prosperous region, the lower Espinharas valley had cotton production as its main agricultural activity until about 1980. This culture was however decimated by plagues and by low prices as a result of the introduction of international competition. This caused a massive migration of the population from the rural area ("fazendas") to urban areas - mainly to Patos, São Jose de Espinharas itself and São Paulo. Competition with more favorable areas like Maranhão and Goiás, not subject to draughts, further lowered the value of the cattle assets. Further reduction in the size of the "fazendas", mostly caused by inheritance transmission, and a series of rainless years in the 1980s and 1990s contributed to the economic decline of São Jose de Espinharas - just like it did for most of the "Sertão" - the peculiar hinterlands of Northeastern Brazil.

Points of interest: casa velha (old house) of Miguel Sátyro, Serra do Tronco, Fazenda Arara, Fazenda Maria Paz, Fazenda Suécia, Fazenda Tronco, Fazenda Flores.
