= Edson Vidigal =

Brazilian politician and lawyer (born 1944)

Superior Court of Justice
- In office December 9, 1987 – March 29, 2006
- President: José Sarney
- Succeeded by: Herman Benjamin

Personal details
- Born: Edson Carvalho Vidigal; July 20, 1944 (age 81) Caxias, MA
- Party: PDT (2011–present)
- Other political affiliations: PSP (1963–1964); ARENA (1970–1980); PP (1980–1981); PMDB (1981–1987); PSB (2006–2009); PSDB (2009–2011)
- Spouse: Eurídice Vidigal
- Children: Edson Vidigal Filho; Everaldo Vidigal; Edson J. T. Vidigal; Érick B. Vidigal; Ernesto T. Vidigal; Eduardo T. Vidigal
- Occupation: Politician
- Profession: Lawyer

Edson Carvalho Vidigal (born July 20, 1944) is a Brazilian politician and lawyer. He served Brazil's Superior Court of Justice from December 9, 1987 to March 29, 2006.
