= Gardênia Ribeiro Gonçalves =

Brazilian politician

Gardênia Santos Ribeiro Gonçalves (born April 1, 1937 in Floriano, Piauí) is a Brazilian politician. She served as mayor of São Luís, from 1986 to 1989. Gonçalves was the spouse of João Castelo. During the 1980s when she was mayor, 15,000 employees lost their jobs.

== See also ==
- List of mayors of São Luís, Maranhão
