= Raimundo Monteiro =

Brazilian politician

President of PT–MA
- In office December 10, 2009 – June 21, 2017

Personal details
- Born: Raimundo Monteiro dos Santos; May 22, 1957 (age 68) Castelo do Piauí, PI
- Party: PT
- Spouse: Lourdes Monteiro
- Profession: Politician

Raimundo Monteiro dos Santos (born May 22, 1957) is a Brazilian politician. He was born in Castelo do Piauí and was superintendent of INCRA (2003–2007). Monteiro is former president of PT in Maranhão. Monteiro ran the government of Maranhão for coalition Maranhão present, Lula president (PT, PCB), ranking third place.
