= Luís Rocha Filho =

Brazilian politician (1964–2023)

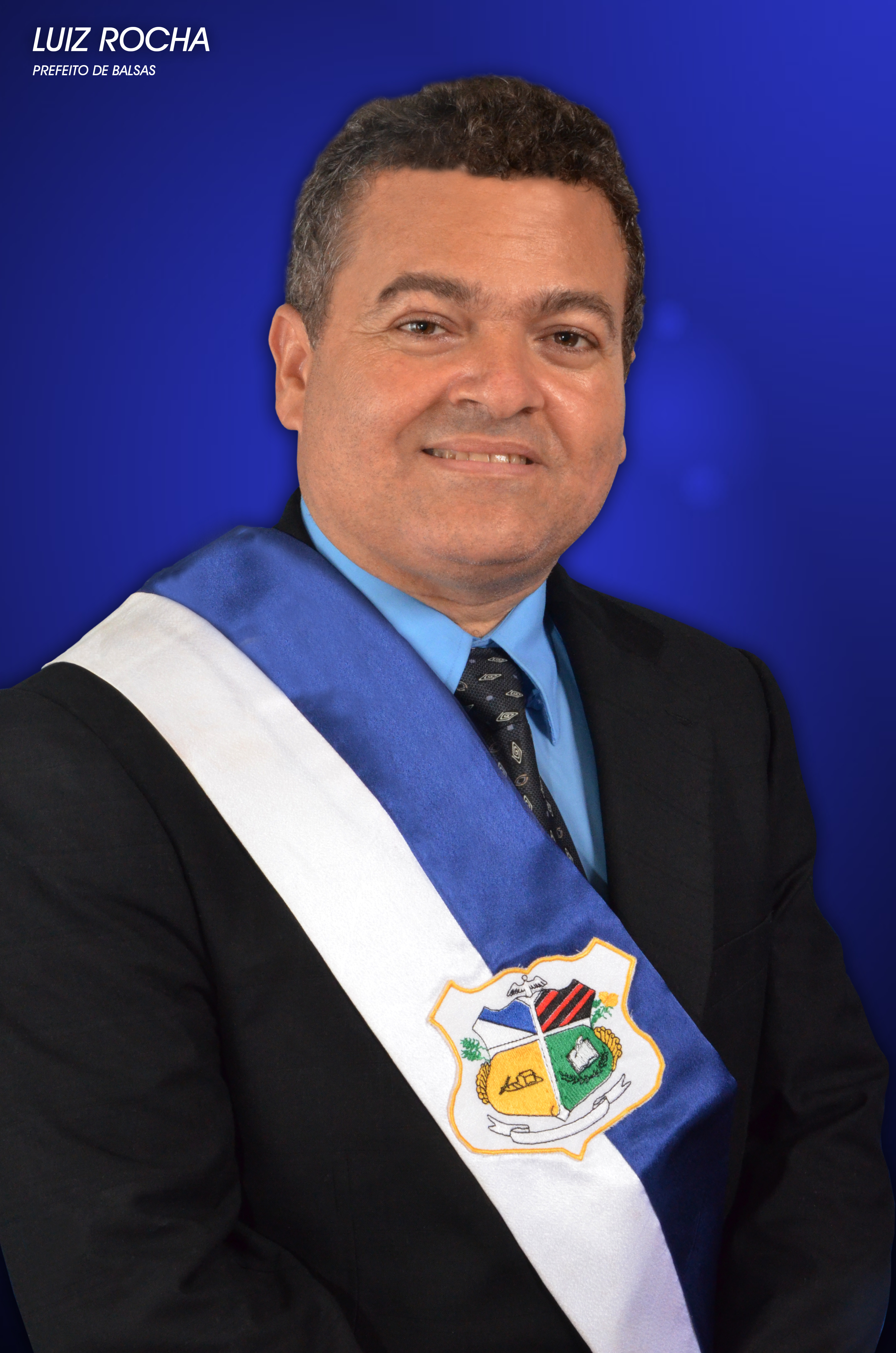
- Filho in 2013

Member of the Chamber of Deputies of Brazil for Maranhão
- In office 5 January 2007 – 31 January 2007

Personal details
- Born: 3 June 1964 São Luís, Maranhão, Brazil
- Died: 14 July 2023 (aged 59) São Luís, Maranhão, Brazil
- Party: PDS (1983–1985); PFL (1985–1987); PL (1987–1993); PMDB (1993–1995); PSDB (1995–2011); PSB (2011–2023)
- Occupation: Lawyer

Luís Rocha Filho (3 June 1964 – 14 July 2023), known as Rochinha, was a Brazilian lawyer and politician. A member of the Brazilian Social Democratic Party, he served in the Chamber of Deputies from 5 January to 31 January 2007.

Rocha died in São Luís on 14 July 2023, at the age of 59.
