= Washington Luiz de Oliveira =

Brazilian politician (born 1949)

Washington Luiz

Vice-governor of Maranhão
- In office January 1, 2011 – November 29, 2013

Federal Deputy from Maranhão
- In office May 22, 2003 – May 31, 2004
- In office May 12, 2009 – April 7, 2010

Personal details
- Born: Joaquim Washington Luiz de Oliveira; December 24, 1949 (age 76) Várzea Alegre, CE
- Party: PT (1988–present); PCdoB (1962–1988)
- Profession: Politician

Joaquim Washington Luiz de Oliveira (born December 24, 1949) is a Brazilian politician. He was federal deputy (2003–2004, 2007, 2009–2010). Oliveira is an advisor to the State Court of Audit.

== Political career ==
In 1994, he ran for federal deputy for the Workers' Party (PT), unsuccessfully.

In 2002, he ran for federal deputy, obtaining his substitution. Endorsed Raimundo Monteiro.

In 2006, he ran for federal deputy, obtaining his substitution. Endorsed Roseana Sarney

In 2010, he ran for vice-governor of Maranhão on board of Roseana Sarney, being elected.

In 2012, he ran for mayor of São Luís, occupying the fourth place.

In 2013, he resigned as vice-governor, being appointed advisor.
