= Castelo do Piauí =

Coordinates: 5°20′S 41°33′W

- Municipality
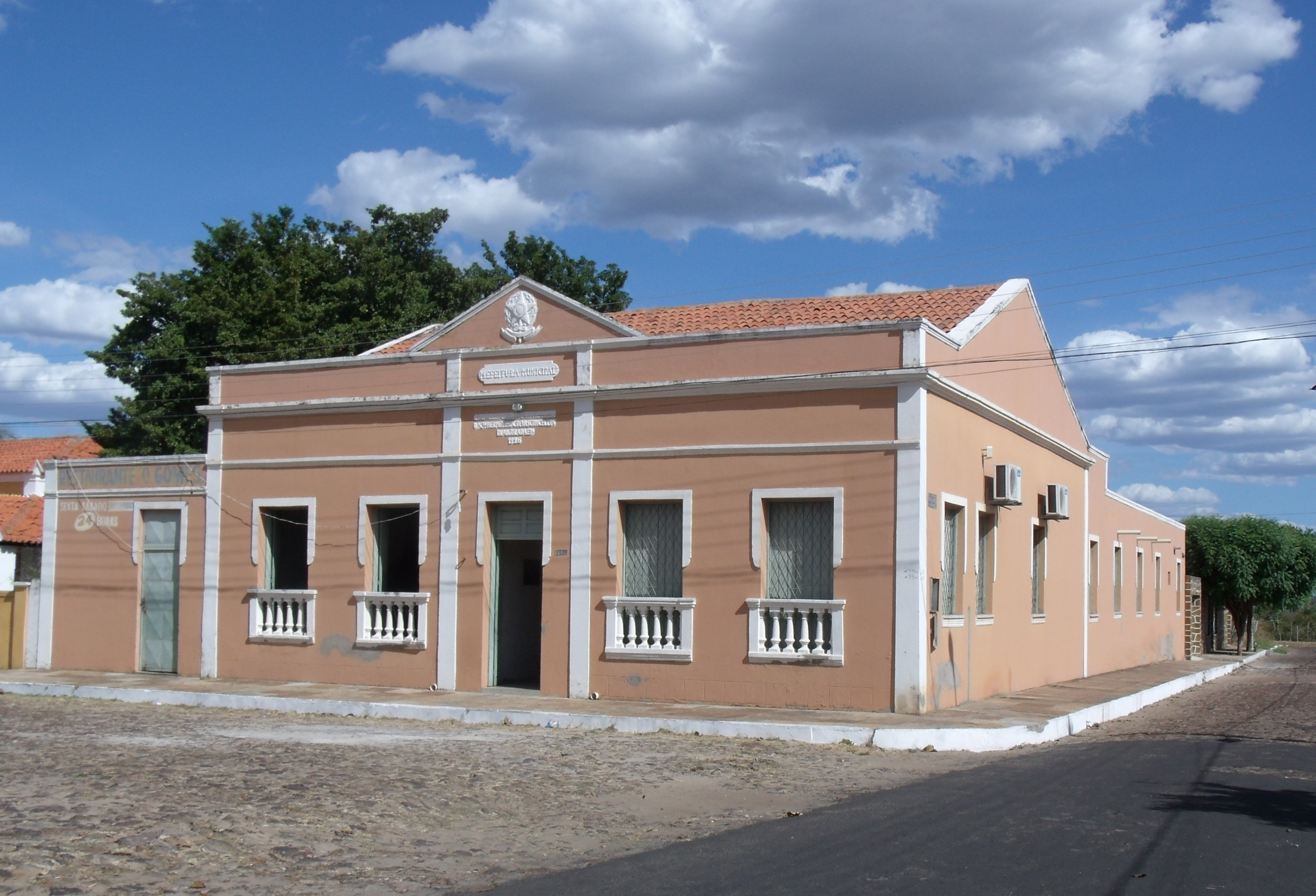

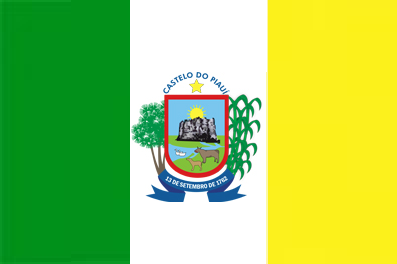
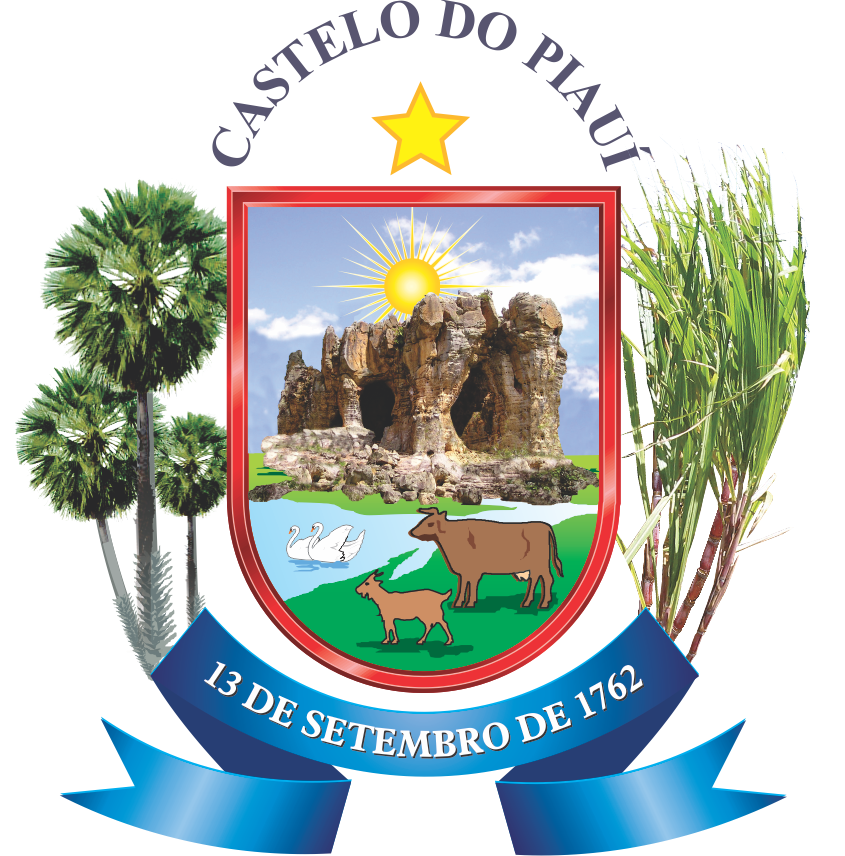
- Flag Coat of arms

- Country: Brazil
- Region: Northeast
- State: Piauí
- Mesoregion: Centro-Norte Piauiense

Population (2020)
  - Total: 19,715
- Time zone: UTC−3 (BRT)

Castelo do Piauí is a municipality in the state of Piauí in the Northeast region of Brazil. It has a population of 19,288 people according to the 2022 census.

== See also ==
- List of municipalities in Piauí
