= João Alberto de Souza =

Brazilian politician and businessman (born 1935)

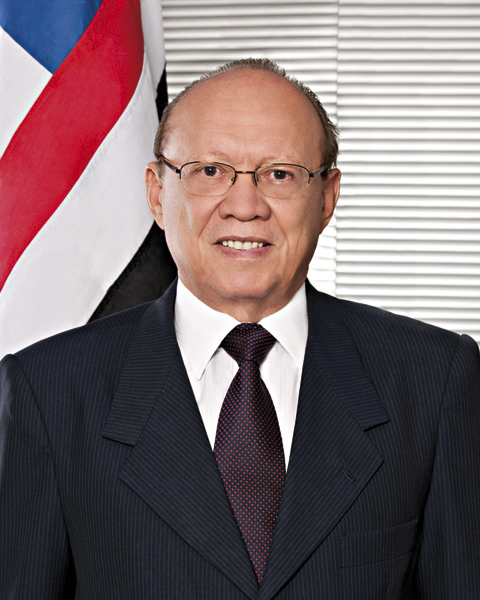

Senator for Maranhão
- In office 1 February 2011 – 1 February 2019
- In office 1 February 1999 – 1 February 2007

Governor of Maranhão
- In office 3 April 1990 – 15 March 1991
- Preceded by: Epitácio Cafeteira
- Succeeded by: Edison Lobão

Vice Governor of Maranhão
- In office 17 April 2009 – 1 January 2011
- Governor: Roseana Sarney
- Preceded by: Luís Carlos Porto
- Succeeded by: Washington Oliveira
- In office 15 March 1987 – 3 April 1990
- Governor: Epitácio Cafeteira
- Preceded by: João Rodolfo
- Succeeded by: José de Ribamar Fiquene

Member of the Chamber of Deputies
- In office 1 February 1995 – 1 February 1999
- Constituency: Maranhão
- In office 1 February 1979 – 1 February 1987
- Constituency: Maranhão

Member of the Legislative Assembly of Maranhão
- In office 1 February 1975 – 1 February 1979
- Constituency: At-large

Personal details
- Born: 1 October 1935 (age 91) São Vicente Ferrer, Maranhão, Brazil
- Party: MDB (1994–present)
- Other political affiliations: ARENA (1970–1979); PDS (1979–1985); PFL (1985–1994)
- Education: Cândido Mendes University (BEc)
- Profession: Economist

João Alberto de Souza (born 1 October 1935) is a Brazilian politician and businessman. He had represented Maranhão in the Federal Senate from 2011 to 2019. Previously, he was a Deputy from Maranhão from 1999 to 2003. Alberto de Souza was governor of Maranhão from 1990 to 1991. He is a member of the Brazilian Democratic Movement Party, for which he was vice governor of Roseana.
