= Edison Lobão =

Brazilian politician (born 1936)

His Excellency Edison Lobão
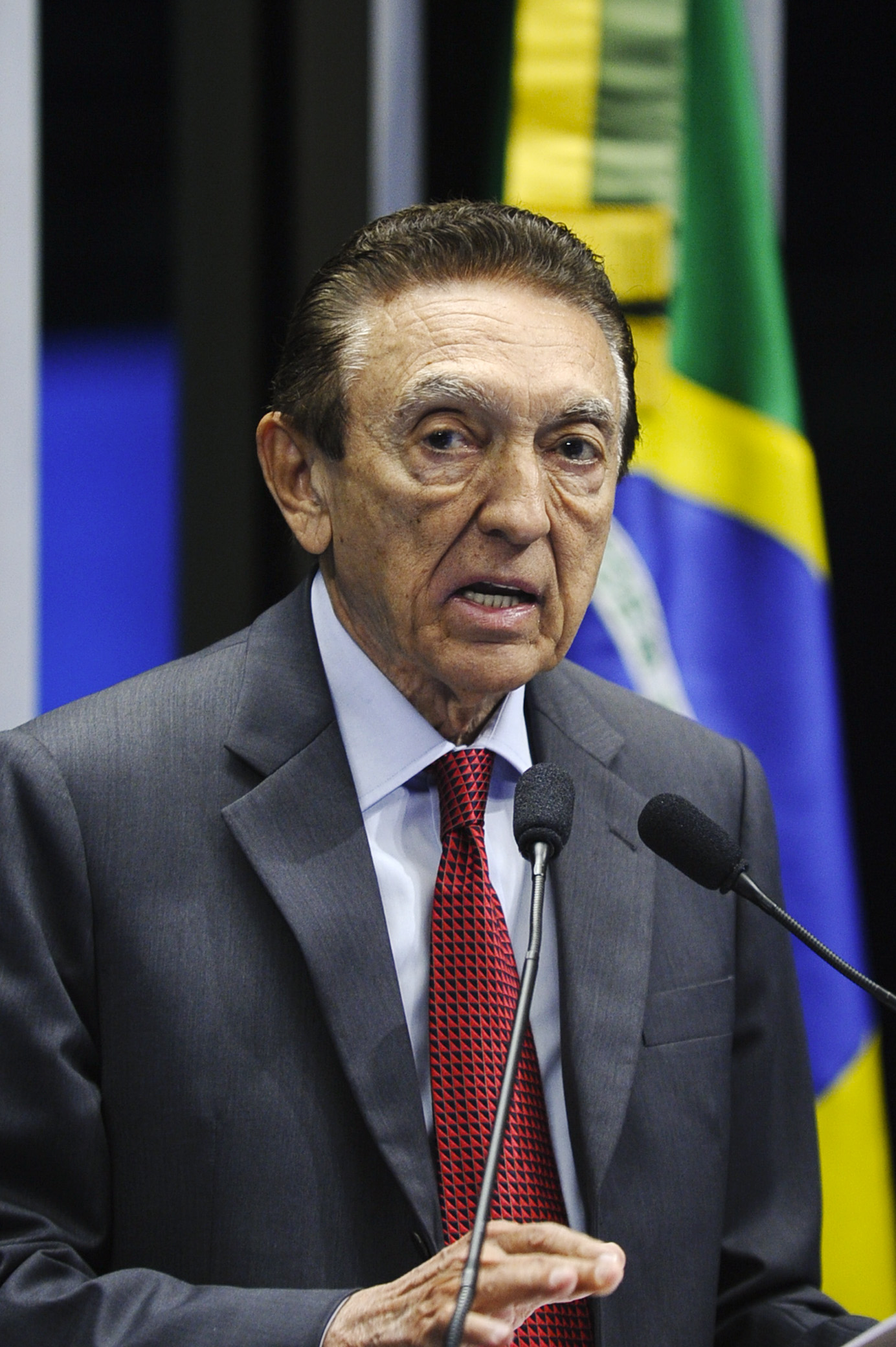

Senator from Maranhão
- In office 1 February 1995 – 1 February 2019
- In office 15 March 1987 – 15 March 1991

Governor of Maranhão
- In office 15 March 1991 – 2 April 1994
- Vice Governor: José de Ribamar Fiquene
- Preceded by: João Alberto
- Succeeded by: José de Ribamar Fiquene

Minister of Mines and Energy
- In office 1 January 2011 – 31 December 2014
- President: Dilma Rousseff
- Preceded by: Márcio Zimmermann
- Succeeded by: Eduardo Braga

President of the Federal Senate (acting)
- In office 19 September 2001 – 20 September 2001
- Preceded by: Jader Barbalho
- Succeeded by: Ramez Tebet

Federal Deputy for Maranhão
- In office 1 February 1979 – 1 February 1987

Personal details
- Born: 5 December 1936 (age 89) Mirador, Maranhão, Brazil
- Party: PMDB (2007–present)
- Other political affiliations: ARENA (1978–1979); PDS (1980–1985); DEM (1985–2007)
- Spouse: Nice Lobão
- Children: 3
- Profession: Politician

Edison Bariano Lobão (born 5 December 1936) is a Brazilian politician. He served as governor of Maranhão from 15 March 1991 to 2 April 1994 and as minister of mines and energy in the national government under the Dilma Rousseff administration. He has also served as a senator from 1987 until 2019.. He served as acting President of the Senate in 2001.
