= Conceição Andrade =

Brazilian lawyer and politician (born 1940)

Mayor of São Luís
- In office January 1, 1993 – January 1, 1997

State deputy from Maranhão
- In office February 1, 1987 – January 31, 1991

Personal details
- Born: Conceição de Maria Carvalho de Andrade; November 19, 1940 (age 85) São Luís, MA
- Party: MDB (2009–present)
- Education: Federal University of Maranhão (UFMA)
- Profession: Lawyer

Conceição de Maria Carvalho de Andrade (born November 19, 1940) is a Brazilian lawyer and politician. She was mayor of São Luís (1993–97) and state deputy (1987–91).

== See also ==
- List of mayors of São Luís, Maranhão
