= Roberto Rocha =

Brazilian politician (born 1965)

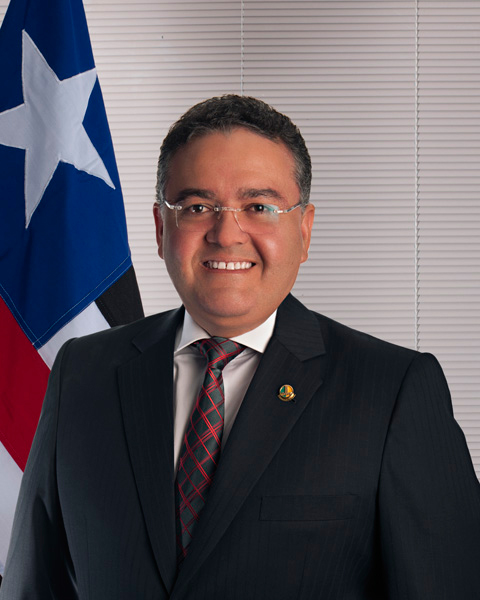

Senator for Maranhão
- In office February 1, 2015 – February 1, 2023
- Preceded by: Epitácio Cafeteira

Congress Majority Leader
- In office February 6, 2019 – March 30, 2021
- Preceded by: Romero Jucá
- Succeeded by: Aguinaldo Ribeiro

Member of the Chamber of Deputies
- In office February 1, 1995 – January 31, 2011
- Constituency: Maranhão

Member of the Legislative Assembly of Maranhão
- In office February 1, 1991 – January 31, 1995
- Constituency: At-large

Personal details
- Born: Roberto Coelho Rocha; August 4, 1965 (age 60) São Luís, Maranhão, Brazil
- Party: PRD (2023–present)
- Other political affiliations: PL (1989–1993); PMDB (1993–1995); PSDB (1995–2010); PSB (2011–2017); PSDB (2017–2022); PTB (2022–2023)
- Spouse: Ana Cristina Diniz Rocha
- Children: 4
- Profession: Politician

Roberto Coelho Rocha (born August 4, 1965) is a Brazilian politician. He had served as Federal Senator from Maranhão from 2015 to 2023.

== See also ==
- Alexia Brito

Brazilian National Congress
Preceded by Romero Jucá	Congress Majority Leader; 2019–21	Succeeded by Aguinaldo Ribeiro
