= Edivaldo Holanda Júnior =

Brazilian politician and lawyer (born 1978)

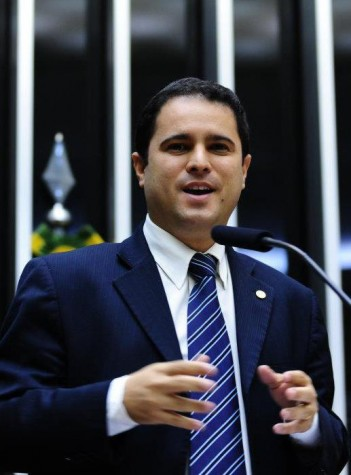
Edivaldo Holanda Junior

Edivaldo de Holanda Braga Junior (born on July 1, 1978) is a lawyer and Brazilian politician. He is the current mayor of São Luís, Maranhão since January 1, 2013. He held the position of councilman from 2005 to 2011 and that of federal deputy from 2011 to 2012.

On October 29, 2016, he was re-elected in the second round.

== See also ==
- List of mayors of São Luís, Maranhão
