= Roseana Sarney =

Brazilian politician and sociologist (born 1953)

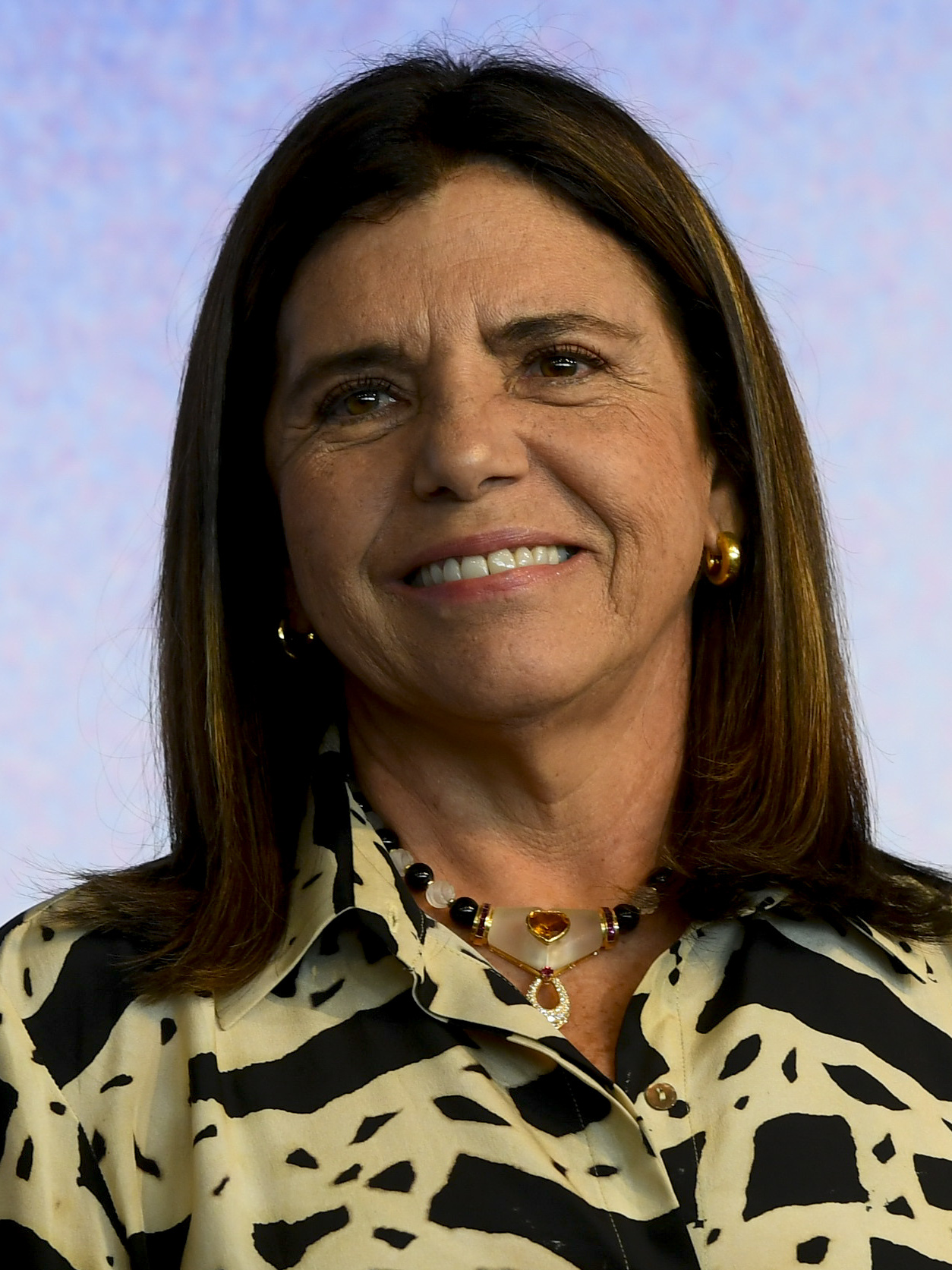
- Sarney in 2024

Member of the Chamber of Deputies
- Incumbent
- Assumed office 1 February 2023
- Constituency: Maranhão
- In office 1 February 1991 – 16 December 1994
- Constituency: Maranhão

Governor of Maranhão
- In office 17 April 2009 – 10 December 2014
- Vice Governor: João Alberto de Souza; Washington Oliveira
- Preceded by: Jackson Lago
- Succeeded by: Arnaldo Melo
- In office 1 January 1995 – 5 April 2002
- Vice Governor: José Reinaldo Tavares
- Preceded by: Ribamar Fiquene
- Succeeded by: José Reinaldo Tavares

Senator for Maranhão
- In office 1 February 2003 – 17 April 2009

Personal details
- Born: 1 June 1953 (age 73) São Luís, Maranhão, Brazil
- Party: MDB (2006–present)
- Other political affiliations: PFL (1990–2006)
- Spouse: Jorge Murad Júnior (m. 1976)
- Parents: José Sarney (father); Marly Sarney (mother)
- Relatives: Adriano Sarney (nephew); Fernando Sarney (brother); Sarney Filho (brother)
- Education: University of Brasília

Roseana Sarney Murad (born 1 June 1953) is a Brazilian politician and sociologist, who previously served as the Governor of Maranhão from 1995 to 2002 and from 2009 to 2014. Sarney served as a Senator from 2003 to 2009 and a member of the Chamber of Deputies from 1991 to 1994 and from 2023 to present. A member of the Brazilian Democratic Movement (MDB), Sarney is the daughter of former President and senator José Sarney.

Sarney considered running for president in 2002, but a corruption scandal led to her withdrawal from the race on 15 April 2002.

== Early life and family ==
Roseana was born at her maternal grandfather's house in São Luís, Maranhão on June 1, 1953. Her father is José Sarney and her mother is Marly Sarney.

=== Sarney family ===
The Sarney family has been described as the "omnipresent political clan" of Maranhão, ruling under José Sarney. Descended from plantation owners, Sarney was an intellectual and businessman affiliated with the ARENA military dictatorship. He acquired in 1972 the newspaper Jornal do Dia, which was later rebranded as O Estado do Maranhão. The media business expanded into an empire called the Mirante Group, now an affiliate of TV Globo, the world's second largest broadcasting corporation.

=== Education ===
Roseana Sarney was educated at the Escola Normal do Maranhão, in São Luís, and, in Brasília, at Colégio Sacré-Coeur de Marie and at Colégio Pré-Universitário. In 1965, she studied at the College of the Marists in Portugal.

In 1970, Sarney was educated in Social Sciences at the University of Brasília before serving as an advisor to NOVACAP, a state urbanization company for the Federal District from 1974 to 1976.

In 1976, Sarney moved to São Paulo, after marrying Jorge Murad, continuing her studies at the Pontifical Catholic University of São Paulo, graduating in 1978 with a major in political science and sociology. Following her education, Sarney served as Extraordinary Secretary of the State of Maranhão for Governor Luís Rocha from 1983 to 1984, before serving as Parliamentary Advisor to the Civil Cabinet of the President of Brazil from 1985 to 1989.

In 1986, Sarney was made an officer of the Order of Prince Henry of Portugal.

== Political career ==
=== Federal Deputy (1991–1994) ===
Sarney became a member of the Liberal Front Party of her father José Sarney, running for Federal Deputy of Maranhão in 1990. Elected with 44,785 votes, Sarney placed first out of all candidates in the state.

In the Chamber, Sarney coordinated undecided Deputies to support the impeachment of Fernando Collor de Mello, before serving as the deputy leader of the government in the Chamber from 1992 to 1994.

In the Chamber of Deputies, Sarney served on the Consumer Protection, Environment and Minorities and Economy, Industry and Commerce committees, along with being chair of the Education, Culture and Sports committee.

In 1994, Sarney resigned from the chamber to assume office as the first female governor in the history of Brazil.
