= Epitácio Cafeteira =

Brazilian politician (1924–2018)

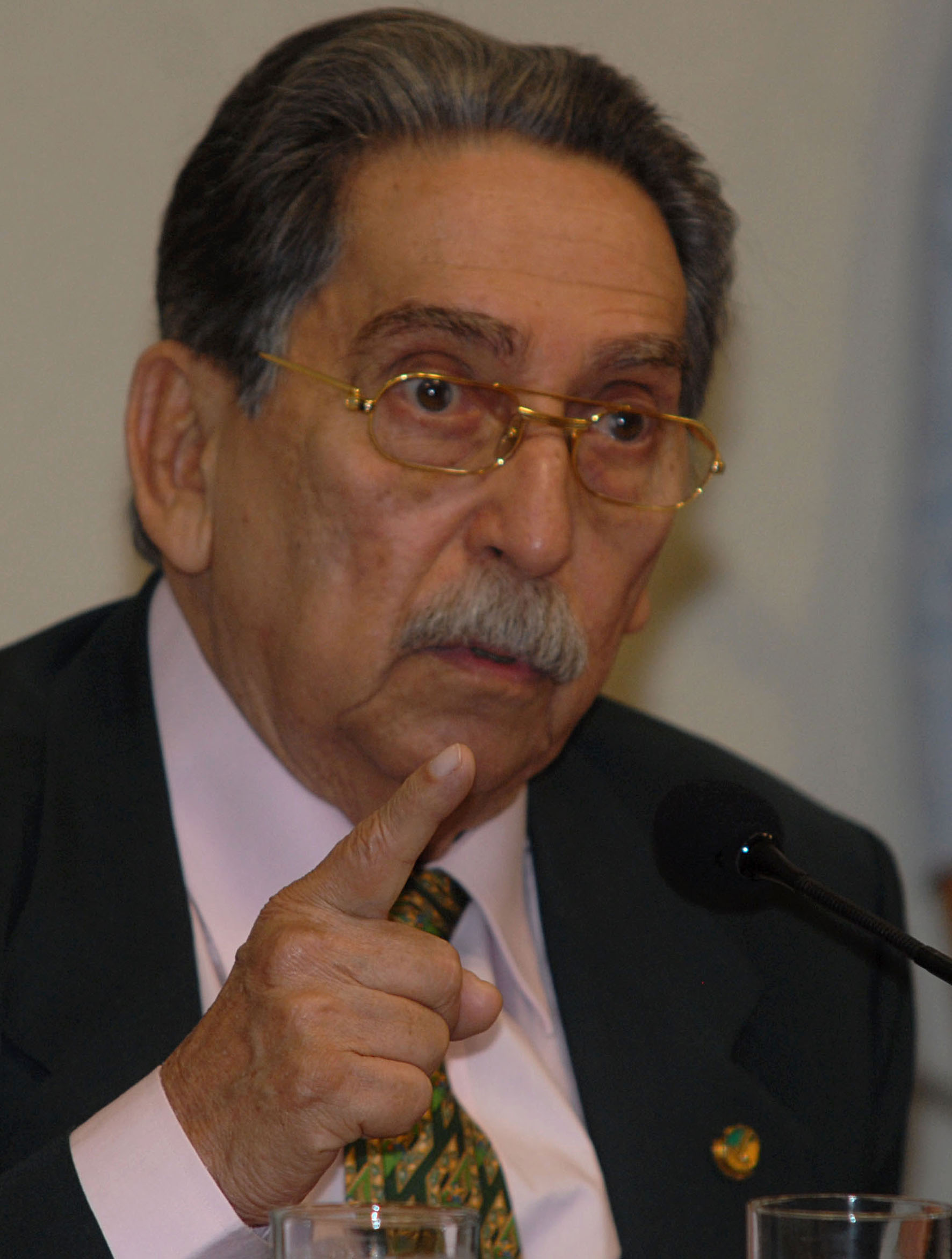

Senator for Maranhão
- In office February 1, 2007 – January 31, 2015
- Preceded by: João Alberto de Souza
- Succeeded by: Roberto Rocha

Governor of Maranhão
- In office March 15, 1987 – April 2, 1990
- Vice Governor: João Alberto de Souza
- Preceded by: Luís Rocha
- Succeeded by: João Alberto de Souza

Federal Deputy for Maranhão
- In office February 1, 1975 – January 31, 1987

Mayor of São Luís
- In office February 1, 1966 – October 15, 1969
- Preceded by: Djard Ramos Martins
- Succeeded by: Vicente Fialho

Personal details
- Born: June 27, 1924 João Pessoa, Paraíba
- Died: May 13, 2018 (aged 93)
- Party: PTB (2005–2018)
- Other political affiliations: PDT (2001–2005); PP (1995–2001); PPR (1993–1995); PDC (1989–1993); MDB (1986–1989); PDT (1985–1986); MDB (1980–1985); MDB (1966–1979); PR (1962–1966)
- Profession: Politician

Epitácio Cafeteira Afonso Pereira (June 27, 1924 – May 13, 2018) was a Brazilian politician. He was federal deputy (1975–1987), governor of Maranhão (1987–1990) and senator (1991–1999, 2007–2015).

== See also ==
- List of mayors of São Luís, Maranhão
