= Jackson Lago =

Brazilian politician (1934–2011)

His Excellency Jackson Lago
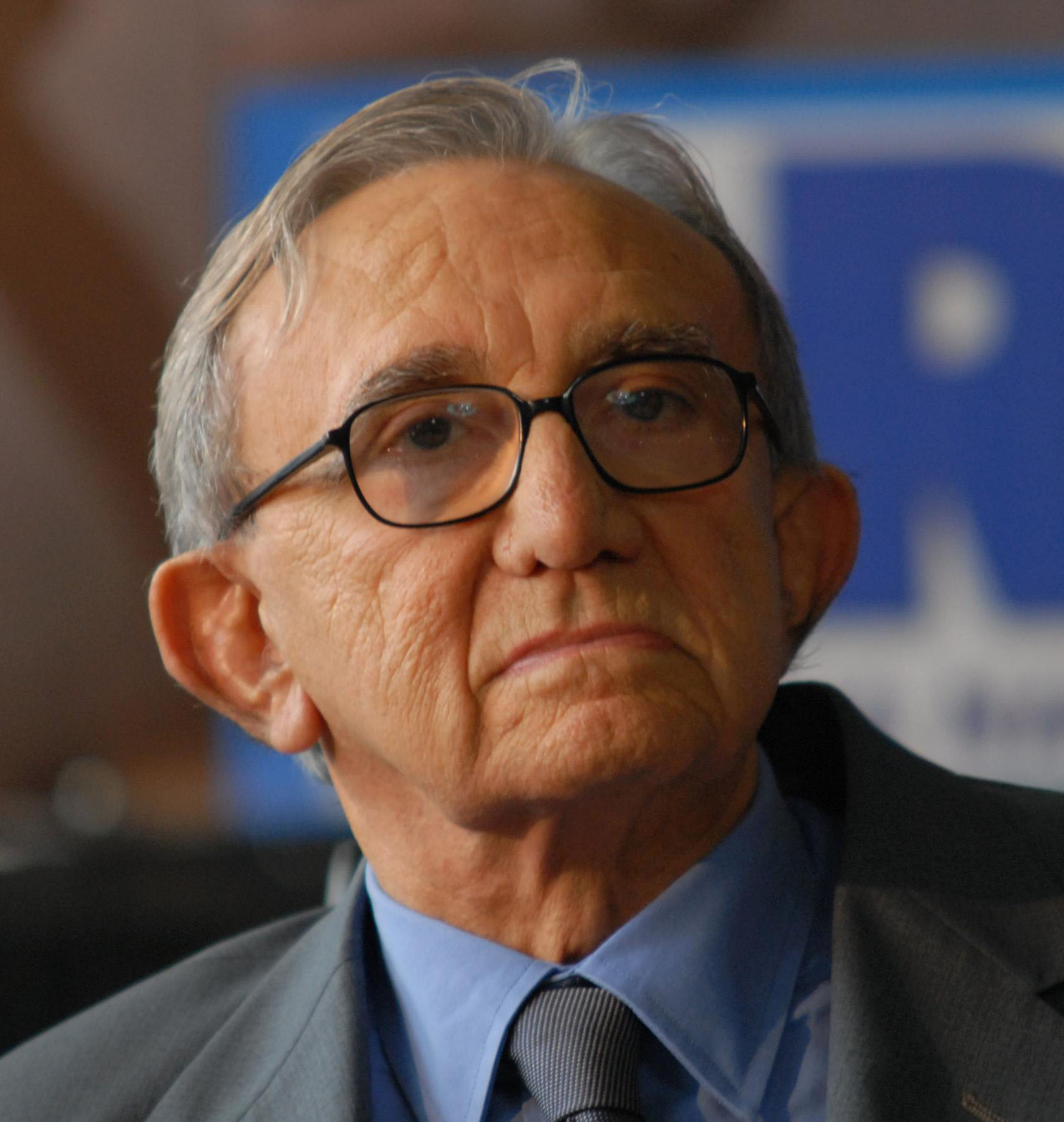

Governor of Maranhão
- In office January 1, 2007 – April 17, 2009
- Vice Governor: Luís Carlos Porto
- Preceded by: José Reinaldo Tavares
- Succeeded by: Roseana Sarney

Mayor of São Luís
- In office January 1, 1997 – April 5, 2002
- Preceded by: Conceição Andrade
- Succeeded by: Tadeu Palácio
- In office January 1, 1989 – January 1, 1993
- Preceded by: Gardênia Ribeiro Gonçalves
- Succeeded by: Conceição Andrade

Personal details
- Born: Jackson Kepler Lago; November 1, 1934 Pedreiras, Maranhão, Brazil
- Died: April 4, 2011 (aged 76) São Paulo, São Paulo, Brazil
- Party: MDB (1966-1980); PMDB (1980); PDT (1980-2011)
- Spouse: Clay Lago
- Relations: Aderson Lago (cousin)
- Children: Ludmilla Lago; Igor Lago; Luciana Lago
- Parent(s): José Ribamar de Carvalho Lago; Neuza Garcez Lago
- Education: UFMA
- Occupation: Politician
- Profession: Physician

Jackson Kepler Lago (November 1, 1934 – April 4, 2011) was a Brazilian physician, politician and teacher. He served as governor of Maranhão from January 1, 2007, to April 16, 2009, when the Brazilian Supreme Electoral Court provided his term. Before being elected governor of Maranhão, Lago was the mayor of São Luís on two occasions (1989–1992 and 1997–2002).

== Political career ==
Born in the municipality of Pedreiras, Maranhão, Lago began his political career in the late 1960s, participating in events against the military dictatorship. A member of the doctors' union, Lago was a pioneer in the performance of thoracic surgeries in the public health system of Maranhão and taught at the Medicine School of the State. In 1979, he helped Leonel Brizola to found the Democratic Labour Party, of which he was a member until his death, in Maranhão.

In 1989, Lago was elected and assumed office as Mayor of São Luís for the first time. On 1996 he was elected by the second time and assumed office on January 1, 1997, for his second term. In 2000 he was re-elected and assumed office on January 1, 2001, for the third time. Lago achieved the title of best mayor in Brazil, being so-named according to research conducted by the newspaper Folha de S. Paulo. Lago considered the expansion of the number of students in public schools and the improved training of teachers to have been his greatest achievements as the head the mayor of São Luís. The Lago administration was also recognized for advances in public health, generation of employment and income, public safety, public participation, infrastructure, environment and culture, among others.

Lago resigned his last term as mayor of São Luís to run to become the governor of Maranhão. Counting initially on the support of only about 20% of the electorate, Lago surprised opinion polling and was elected in the second round with 51.82% of the valid votes against 48.18% of former governor Roseana Sarney. An IBOPE survey commissioned by TV Mirante had indicated that Sarney would win the election in the first round. Only the Toledo & Associates Institute, hired by the newspaper O Imparcial, foresaw the possibility of runoff voting in the state. During his campaign, Lago bet on the political wear of the Sarneys, strongly denouncing the alleged corruption cases involving the group linked with them. Lago's campaign material was shared with President Lula, although Lula declared his public support for Sarney. His election was celebrated as a victory against the 40-year rule of the Sarney oligarchy in the state.

=== Repeal ===
Lago was accused by the coalition of the defeated candidate of committing electoral crimes, such as abuse of power and buying votes, during the elections of 2006. On March 2, 2009, the STF tried a lawsuit by the coalition of the defeated candidate Roseana Sarney and decided, by 5-2 votes, to revoke the terms of both Lago and Luiz Carlos Porto, the vice-governor of Maranhão and a member of the PPS. Contrary to what the Electoral law demands, the holding of new elections, the Court instead decided that the candidate who placed second in the elections would assume the vacated office.

On April 16, 2009, the STF in denying all appeals confirmed the repeal of both the Lago and Porto mandates. It also confirmed that Roseana Sarney would assume office. However, Lago refused to leave the Palácio dos Leões, the seat of government. On April 18, he left the palace with members of his party and even of Lula's PT, in addition to members of social movements such as the MST, and led a march to the local seat of the PDT. There, he promised his supporters to continue his political career. He lost the 2010 gubernatorial election overwhelmingly, taking third place with 19,5% of the vote, while Roseana was re-elected.

=== Death ===
Lago died of prostate cancer on April 4, 2011, in São Paulo at the age of 76.

== Personal life ==
Lago was married with Maria Moreira Clay Lago, also a doctor, with whom he had three children. Maria Clay was the State Secretary of Human Solidarity during the term of governor José Reinaldo Tavares, after his rupture with the Sarney family in May 2004.

== See also ==
- List of mayors of São Luís, Maranhão
