= João Castelo =

Brazilian politician and lawyer (1937–2016)

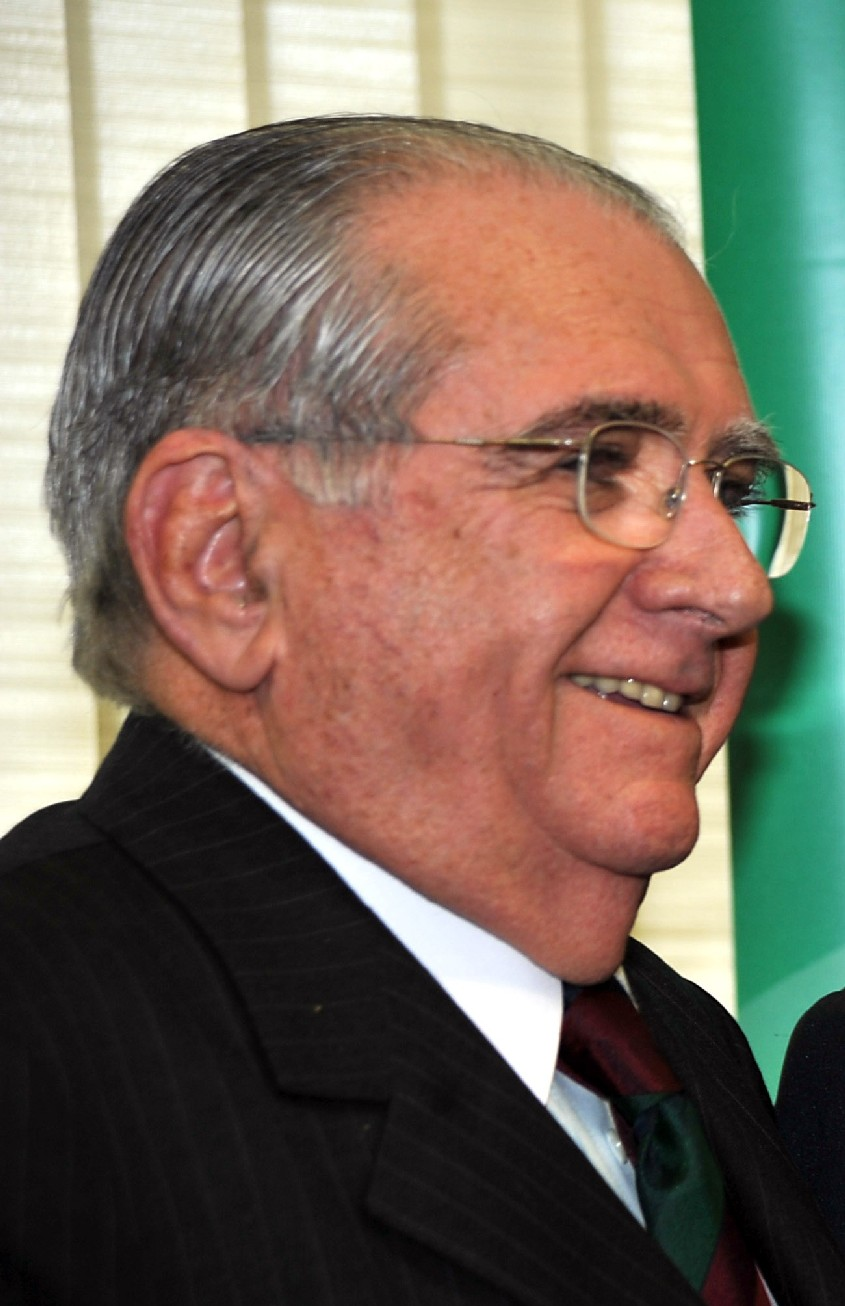

Federal Deputy from Maranhão
- In office February 1, 2015 – December 11, 2016
- In office February 1, 1999 – January 1, 2007

Mayor of São Luís
- In office January 1, 2009 – January 1, 2013
- Preceded by: Tadeu Palácio
- Succeeded by: Edivaldo Holanda Junior

Governor of Maranhão
- In office March 15, 1979 – May 15, 1982
- Preceded by: Nunes Freire
- Succeeded by: Ivar Saldanha

Personal details
- Born: João Castelo Ribeiro Gonçalves; October 19, 1937 Caxias, Maranhão
- Died: December 11, 2016 (aged 79) São Paulo, SP
- Party: PSDB (1997–2016); PPB (1993–1997); PRN (1989–1993); PDS (1980–1989); ARENA (1967–1980)
- Spouse: Gardênia Gonçalves (m. 1952–2016)
- Children: João Castelo Filho; Gardênia Castelo; Thales Castelo (in memoriam)
- Occupation: Politician
- Profession: Lawyer

João Castelo Ribeiro Gonçalves (October 19, 1937 – December 11, 2016) was a Brazilian politician and lawyer who was Governor of Maranhão, Brazil from March 15, 1979, to May 15, 1982.

== Biographical data ==
João Castelo was born into the family of Tales of Amarante Ribeiro Gonçalves and Maria Antonieta Cruz Ribeiro Gonçalves. A registered administrative technician at the Federal Council, he was assistant to the Cabinet of Mayor Carlos Vasconcelos in São Luís until he became an employee of the Banco da Amazônia in 1956, eventually occupying one of his boards before joining politics.

He also held the following functions: State Treasurer of Maranhão, Member of Working Group for Data Processing and Technical Standards of the Ministry of the Interior, and Member of the Banking Advisory Committee of the National Monetary Council. During his tenure as governor, he served on the deliberative council of the Superintendency of Development of the Amazon and the Superintendency of Development of the Northeast.

He received the title of "Doctor Honoris Causa" from the Federal University of Maranhão, and then, in 1984 graduated in Law from the Unified School of Brasília.

== Political trajectory ==
Affiliated with the National Renewal Alliance, he was elected federal deputy in 1970 and 1974 and thanks to the system of indirect elections, Castelo was chosen governor of Maranhão in 1978 by the president Ernesto Geisel whose option avoided a confrontation between the arenistas factions of Jose Sarney and Osvaldo of Costa Nunes Freire.

With the extinction of the Institutional Act Number Two joined the Democratic Social Party and by this legend was elected senator in 1982. In succession of the president João Figueiredo, voted in Paulo Maluf in the Electoral College in 1985 although the winner was Tancredo Neves in a plate where Jose Sarney was vice president and this one assumed the Palace of the Planalto with the illness and death of the holder.

In 1989 he joined the National Reconstruction Party, he supported the successful candidacy of Fernando Collor de Mello to the presidency of the Republic and he received support to return to the government of Maranhão in 1990, though he was defeated by Edison Lobão in the second round.

Affiliated with parties that preceded the current Progressive Party, he was defeated when he disputed a senatorial mandate in 1994 and the city of São Luís in 1996. After migrating to the Brazilian Social Democracy Party, he lost new elections to the city hall of the Maranhão capital in 2000, 2004 and 2012 and to the Brazilian Federal Senate in 2006. On the other hand, he was elected federal deputy in 1998, 2002 and 2014 and mayor of the capital of Maranhão in 2008.

On April 17, 2016, she voted in favor of opening the Impeachment Process of Dilma Rousseff in the plenary of the Chamber of Deputies of Brazil.

== Death ==
He died at the age of 79 on December 11, 2016, after complications from a surgery.

== See also ==
- List of mayors of São Luís, Maranhão
