= José Reinaldo =

Brazilian engineer and politician

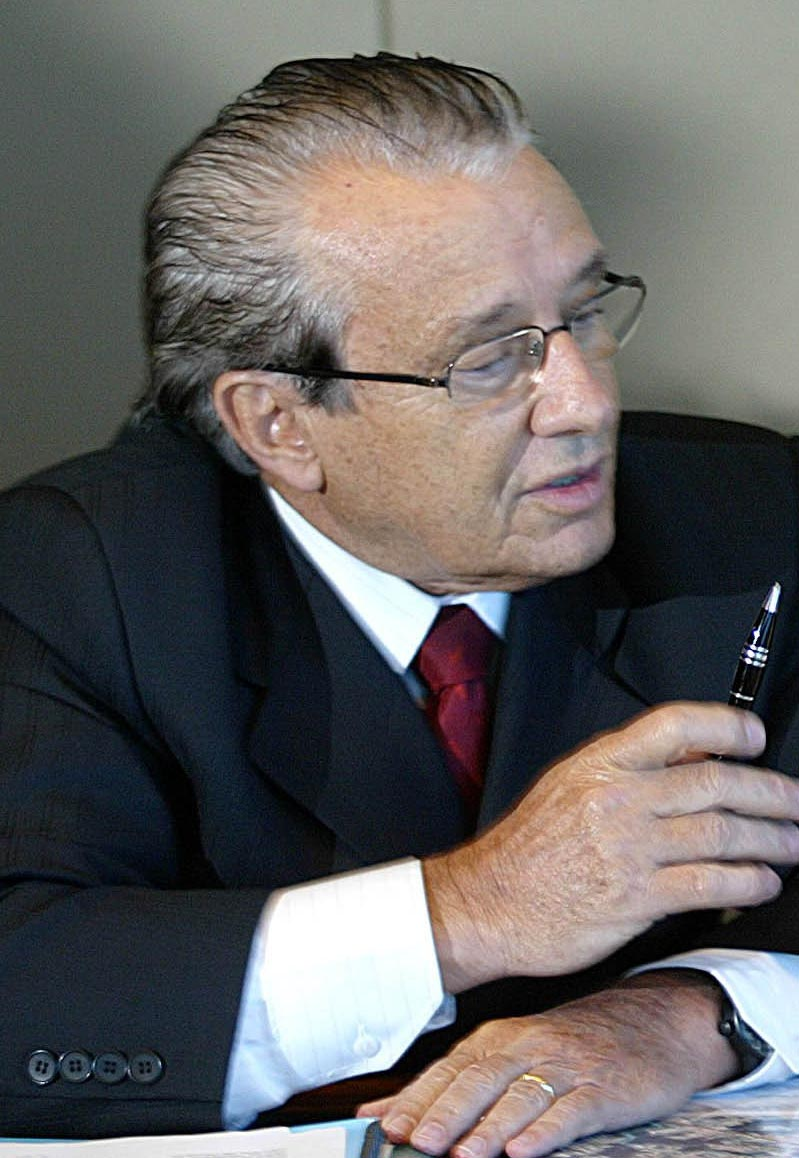

Governor of Maranhão
- In office April 5, 2002 – January 1, 2007

Minister of Transport
- In office February 14, 1986 – March 15, 1990
- President: José Sarney
- Preceded by: Affonso Camargo
- Succeeded by: Ozires Silva

Federal Deputy from Maranhão
- Incumbent
- Assumed office February 1, 2015
- In office February 1, 1991 – December 28, 1994

Personal details
- Born: José Reinaldo Carneiro Tavares; March 19, 1939 (age 87) São Luís, MA
- Party: PMDB (1986–1990); PDC (1989–1990); PFL (1990–2004); PTB (2004–2005); PSB (2005–2018); PSDB (since 2018)
- Spouse: Ana Tavares
- Children: 10
- Occupation: Engineer
- Profession: Politician

José Reinaldo Carneiro Tavares (born March 19, 1939) is a Brazilian engineer and politician. He served as governor of Maranhão, from 2002 to 2007. Was minister of Transport (1986–1990) during José Sarney's presidency. Tavares currently serves as federal deputy.
