= 2024 Goiânia mayoral election =

- 6 October 2024 (first round); 27 October 2024 (second round)
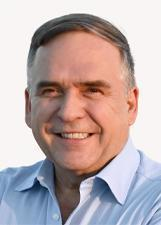

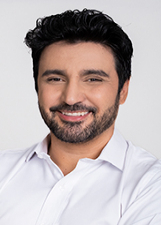
Nominee	Sandro Mabel	Fred Rodrigues
Party	UNIÃO	PL
Alliance	Union for Goiânia	Goiânia Above All
Running mate	Coronel Cláudia	Leonardo Rizzo
Popular vote	353,518	283,054
Percentage	55.53%	46.47%
Mayor before election
Rogério Cruz
Solidarity
Elected mayor
Sandro Mabel
UNIÃO
- Municipal Chamber election
Party	Leader	Vote %	Seats	+/–
Municipal Chamber
MDB	Sergeant Novandir	13.02%	8	+2
PL	Major Vitor Hugo	11.07%	4	+3
FE Brasil	Professor Edward	7.61%	3	+2
PRD	Gcm Romario Policarpo	6.66%	3	0
UNIÃO	Lucas Kitão	6.20%	3	+1
Solidarity	Ronilson Reis	6.09%	3	+2
PSDB-Cidadania	Osvaldo Lopes	5.85%	2	0
PRTB	William Do Armazém Silva	5.74%	3	0
Republicanos	Wanderley Porto	4.78%	2	−1
PP	Heyler Leao	4.25%	2	+1
PDT	Juarez Lopes	3.65%	1	0
DC	Bessa	3.60%	1	−1
Agir	Dr Gustavo	3.50%	1	0
PODE	Léia Klebia	3.17%	1	−1
Avante	Thialu Guiotti	2.91%	1	−1
This lists parties that won seats. See the complete results below.

The 2024 Goiânia municipal election took place in the city of Goiânia, Brazil on 6 October 2024. Voters elected 41 councillors. A second round was held on October 27 as no candidate achieved 50% in the first round for mayor.

The incumbent mayor is Rogério Cruz of Solidarity. Cruz became mayor after the death of Maguito Vilela due to COVID-19. Cruz was elected as a member of the Republicanos.

State Deputy Fred Rodrigues of the Liberal Party and Federal Deputy Sandro Mabel of the Brazil Union advanced to a second round. They defeated the candidate of President Lula Adriana Accorsi of the Workers' Party and Cruz.

Mabel was the candidate of Governor of Goiás Ronaldo Caiado and Rodrigues was the candidate of Jair Bolsonaro. Mabel was victorious by 70,000 votes.
