= 2012 Goiânia mayoral election =

- October 7, 2012
- Opinion polls
- Turnout: 87.59%
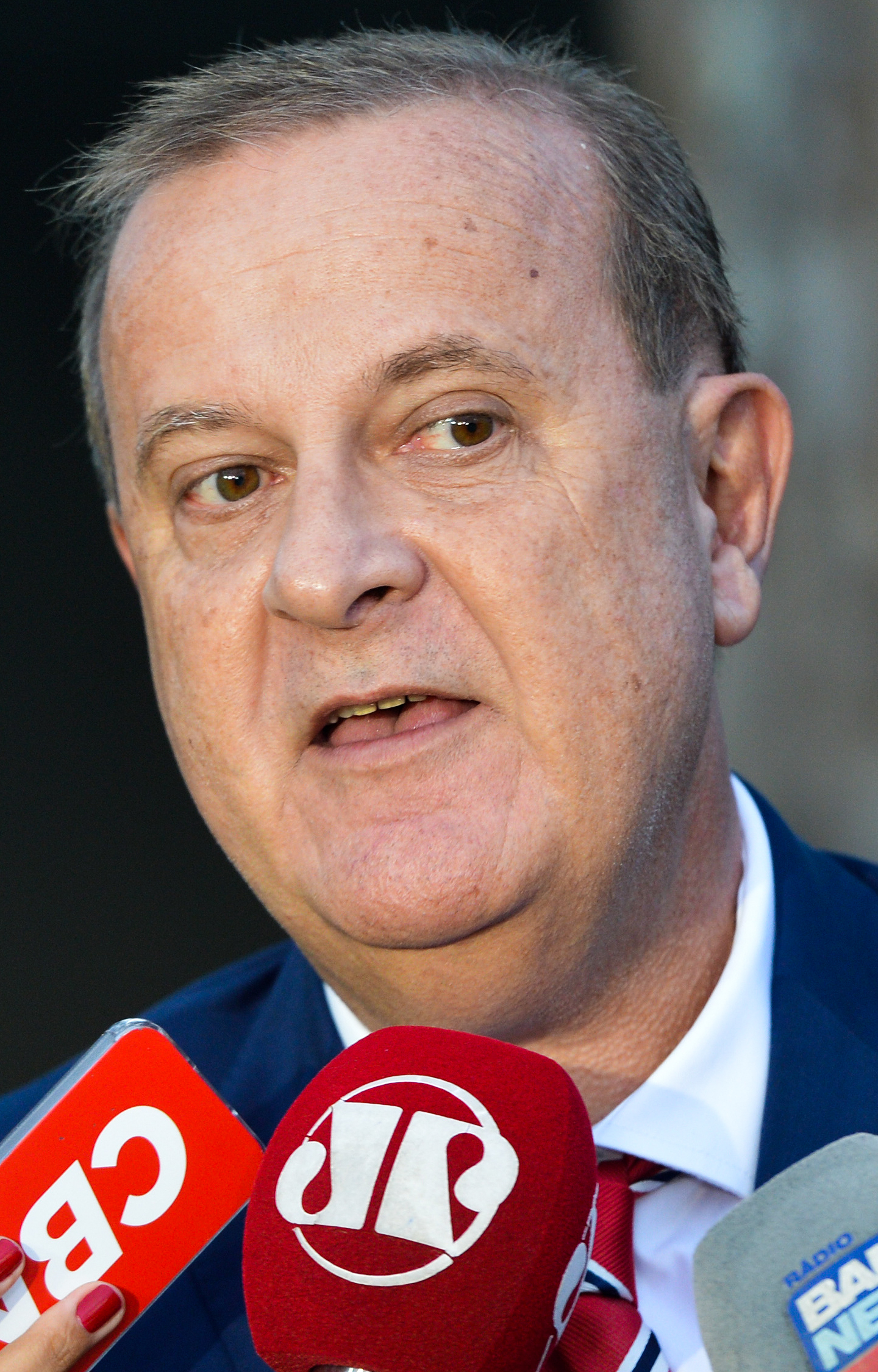

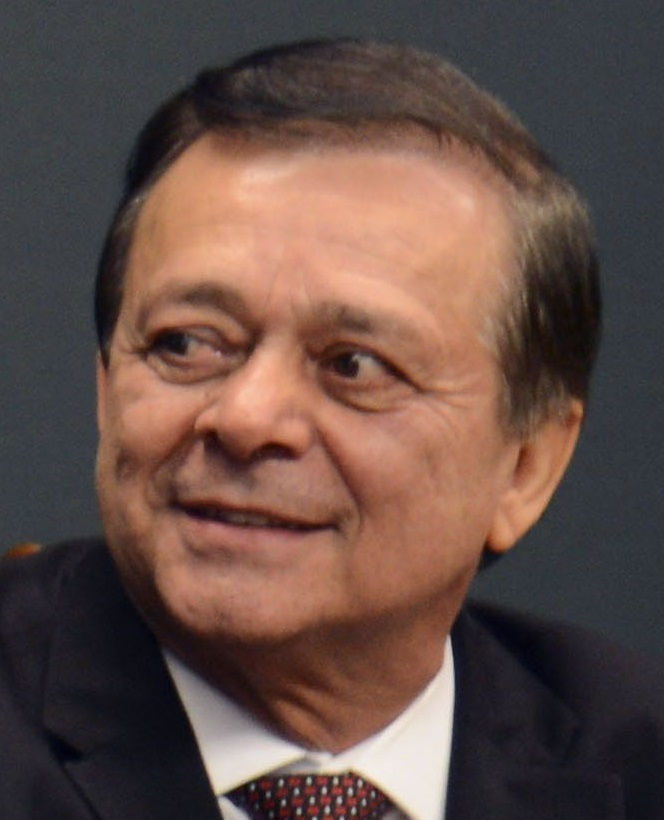
Candidate	Paulo Garcia	Jovair Arantes
Party	PT	PTB
Popular vote	349,335	86,287
Percentage	57.68%	14.25%
Mayor before election
Paulo Garcia
PT
Elected mayor
Paulo Garcia
PT

The Goiânia mayoral election of 2012 was held on 7 October as part of the municipal elections in Brazil. Then incumbent mayor, Paulo Garcia, elected as the running mate of Iris Rezende in the previous election, ran against seven other candidates and was re-elected with more than 57% of the valid votes. On the same date, voters also chose their 35 representatives for the Municipal Chamber (Câmara Municipal). The elected mayor, deputy-mayor and aldermen will serve from 1 January 2013 until 31 December 2016, when their terms will officially expire.

Although he faced seven contestants, Garcia found no major problems in being re-elected in the first round. He took advantage of the outcome of the Monte Carlo Operation, led by the Federal Police (Polícia Federal – PF) early in 2012. Until then, the candidate backed by Governor Marconi Perillo, then-Senator Demóstenes Torres, was the favorite in the opinion polls. PF's investigations, however, revealed that Perillo was an accessory to mobster Carlinhos Cachoeira and that Torres lobbied on his behalf at the Senate. Allegations of corruption undermined the intention of Perillo's Brazilian Social Democracy Party (Partido da Social Democracia Brasileira – PSDB) to launch Congressman Leonardo Vilela, also associated with Cachoeira, or to support Torres, who was later impeached for his affiliation with the offender. Therefore, Perillo decided to support Congressman Jovair Arantes, who was hampered by the unpopularity of the latter.

== Electorate ==
In the 2012 election, 850,777 people were eligible to vote in Goiânia, which corresponded to 64.5% of the city's population, according to estimates from the Brazilian Institute of Geography and Statistics (Instituto Brasileiro de Geografia e Estatística – IBGE). The city is divided into ten precincts – organized similarly to the city's official subdivision –, 2,909 voting rooms and 359 polling places. In 2012, biometric voting machines – which identifies voters by their fingerprints – were introduced in Goiânia. From 11 April 2011 to 23 March 2012, voters were called upon by the Regional Electoral Court (Tribunal Regional Eleitoral de Goiás – TRE) to register their fingerprints. By the end of the period, more than 80% of voters had made the registration. The deadline was later extended until 9 May 2012. The refusal to register resulted in the cancellation of the voter registration card and in a fine ranging from 3% to 10% of the minimum wage. Without the card, a regular Brazilian is unable to get a passport, to retire from the Social Security, to enroll in public schools or universities, to obtain a loan from state-run banks or to become a civil servant. According to TRE-GO, 123,000 voter cards were canceled in Goiânia due to the lack of fingerprint registration.

== Context ==
On 6 October 2008, then mayor and former governor Iris Rezende, of the Brazilian Democratic Movement Party (Partido do Movimento Democrático Brasileiro – PMDB) was re-elected with 74% of the valid votes. His approval rating was of 81% at the time and he became the first mayor of Goiânia to be re-elected. On 1 April 2010, Rezende resigned from the office in order to run for governor at the 2010 elections. Deputy-mayor Paulo Garcia, of the Workers' Party (Partido dos Trabalhadores – PT), – a party opposed to irismo until they reconciled to form Rezende's electoral coalition in 2008 – took office. Rezende lost the gubernatorial race to former governor and then-senator Marconi Perillo, of the Brazilian Social Democracy Party (Partido da Social Democracia Brasileira – PSDB), elected on the second round with 53% of the valid votes.

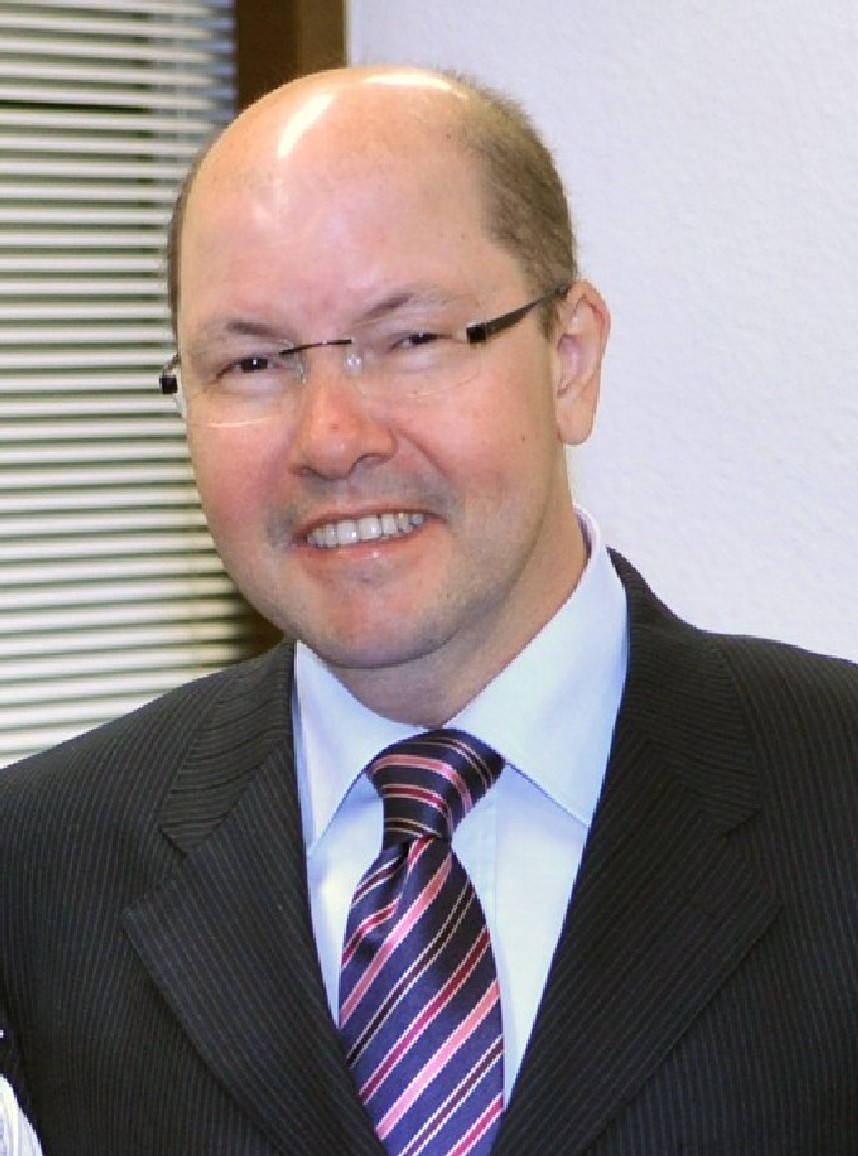
Former Senator Demóstenes Torres was the favorite candidate for mayor until the disclosure of his relation with Cachoeira.

Shortly before the definition of candidates for mayor, on 29 February 2012, criminal offender Carlinhos Cachoeira, which profited between 1 and 3 million reais (around 0.5 to 1.5 million dollars) per month through the illegal jogo do bicho was arrested in Goiânia as a result of the Monte Carlo Operation, led by the Federal Police (Polícia Federal – PF). Wiretaps revealed close ties between Cachoeira and then-Senator Demóstenes Torres, from the Democrats (Democratas – DEM). Torres lobbied in Cachoeira's behalf at the National Congress. In order to avoid an expulsion from his party, Torres asked to be disaffiliated from DEM. Before the outbreak of the scandal, he was the favorite candidate of the population of Goiânia for mayor, with 43.4% of the voting intention. Two weeks prior to the Monte Carlo Operation, Torres announced that he would not run in order not to undermine the opposition to Dilma Rousseff's administration in the Congress. Torres later became the second member in the history of the Senate to be impeached, becoming ineligible until 2027. Another pre-candidate harmed by his relationship with Cachoeira was alderman Elias Vaz, from the far-left Socialism and Liberty Party (Partido Socialismo e Liberdade – PSOL), which had between 14% and 18% of the voting intention. In one of the wiretaps, he calls Cachoeira "my comrade". In late June, Vaz announced that he would not run for mayor in order to try to keep his seat at the Municipal Chamber.

In addition to local and federal lawmakers, wiretaps also revealed Cachoeira's influence in the state government of Goiás. The offender paid the expenses of Marconi Perillo's gubernatorial campaign and bought a house that belonged to the latter (the same place where he was arrested by the PF), arranging for the purchase money to be delivered at the Emerald Palace (Palácio das Esmeraldas), seat of the state government. There is also evidence that Eliane Pinheiro, former chief of staff to the governor, has delivered classified information to Cachoeira's group and that Edivaldo Cardoso de Paula, former president of the State Traffic Department of Goiás (Departamento Estadual de Trânsito – Detran-GO), was nominated to the position at Cachoeira's request. After the media disclosed the ties between Perillo and Cachoeira, the Governor faced several protests in the streets of Goiânia and reached high levels of unpopularity, facing a disapproval rating of 74.4% in Goiânia on late July. According to Serpes institute, 26% of voters would consider the scandal when choosing their mayoral candidate.

Federal deputy, Jovair Arantes, of the Brazilian Labour Party (Partido Trabalhista Brasileiro – PTB), which was cited by members of Cachoeira's group in wiretaps, was chosen as the candidate of the Marconists and had the highest rejection rate throughout the campaign. When asked by the press about his relationship with Cachoeira, Arantes replied: "I asked for a donation for my campaign; if he has committed a crime, it's not of my business". Cornered by the accusations, Marconists reacted. They launched an investigative committee at the Legislative Assembly (Assembleia Legislativa de Goiás – Alego) in order to investigate the relations between municipal politicians and the offender. It approved disclosing the banking, income tax and telephone data of mayor Garcia and former mayor Rezende, while it refused to summon both Perillo and Cachoeira. According to political analyst Vassil Oliveira, their strategy was to use the investigative committee to wear out Paulo and, thus, consolidate Arantes. Nevertheless, Garcia and Rezende filed a collective lawsuit against Alego; they claimed that it does not compete to the Assembly the investigation of contracts which are not funded by the state of Goiás. A week after the election, judge Luis Eduardo de Souza granted an injunction overturning Alego's intention of disclosing the personal data of both Garcia and Rezende.

== Candidates ==
The 2012 election was contested by eight candidates, tying with 2004 as the election with the largest number of candidates in the history of Goiânia. The candidates were: incumbent mayor Paulo Garcia of the centre-left coalition Goiânia, Sustainable City; federal deputy Jovair Arantes of the centre-right Marconist coalition; state deputy Isaura Lemos; state deputy and TV and radio presenter Elias Júnior; alderman Simeyzon Silveira; business manager José Netho; lawyer Rubens Donizzeti; and history teacher Reinaldo Pantaleão. All of them, with the exception of José Netho and Isaura Lemos, have higher education diploma.

Candidates in the Goiânia mayoral election, 2012
Candidate	Running mate	TSE number	Party	Coalition	Expenditure limit
Elias Júnior	Darlan Braz	33	PMN	Popular Mobilization (PMN, PPS)	R$ 1,000,000
José Netho	Eneas	54	PPL	—	R$ 3.000.000
Jovair Arantes	Francisco Júnior	14	PTB	Goiânia 24 Hours (PTB, PP, PSL, PHS, PTC, PV, PSDB, PSD, PTdoB)	R$ 15.000.000
Isaura Lemos	Denise Carvalho	65	PCdoB	—	R$ 2.000.000
Paulo Garcia	Agenor Mariano	13	PT	Goiânia, Sustainable City (PT, PRB, PDT, PMDB, PTN, PR, PSDC, PRTB, PSB)	R$ 25.000.000
Reinaldo Pantaleão	João Victor Nunes Leite	50	PSOL	PSOL–PCB	R$ 500.000
Rubens Donizzeti	Alzira Borges	16	PSTU	—	R$ 25.000
Simeyzon Silveira	Rafael Rahif	20	PSC	Goiânia: My City, My Family (PSC, DEM, PRP)	R$ 8.000.000

== Opinion polls ==
Date	Poll source	Candidates								None/ Undecided	Margin of error
Date	Poll source	Paulo Garcia (PT)	Jovair Arantes (PTB)	Elias Júnior (PMN)	Simeyzon (PSC)	Isaura Lemos (PCdoB)	Pantaleão (PSOL)	José Netho (PPL)	Donizzeti (PSTU)	None/ Undecided	Margin of error
12–16 July	Serpes	34.1%	7.7%	7.2%	1.4%	10.0%	1.5%	1.2%	0.5%	36.6%	± 4.0%
21–24 July	Grupom	26.2%	6.9%	8.2%	1.4%	12.9%	1.1%	1.9%	1.0%	40.4%	± 3.9%
7–10 August	Serpes	33.9%	7.0%	5.8%	1.7%	8.0%	1.7%	1.0%	0.3%	40.6%	± 4.0%
21–23 August	Ipem	40.6%	10.4%	6.3%	1.1%	8.0%	1.1%	0.5%	0.1%	31.9%	± 3.5%
24–27 August	Grupom	34.1%	9.5%	6.4%	2.7%	7.2%	1.1%	0.8%	0.5%	37.7%	± 3.9%
27–29 August	Ibope	34%	8%	7%	3%	6%	2%	1%	–	38%	± 4%
27–31 August	Serpes	33.1%	8.9%	6.4%	3.0%	6.0%	1.9%	0.4%	0.7%	39.7%	± 3.5%
6–9 September	Veritá	32.9%	13.8%	8.5%	8.0%	4.7%	3.0%	1.4%	0.8%	15.3%	± 3.9%
10–12 September	Ibope	41%	11%	9%	4%	4%	3%	1%	1%	26%	± 4%
11–15 September	Serpes	38.6%	11.5%	6.9%	4.1%	3.4%	1.6%	0.2%	0.4%	33.3%	± 3.4%
12–14 September	Fortiori	43.5%	13.3%	9.5%	5.5%	3.2%	1.3%	0.7%	0.3%	22.7%	± 4%
13–16 September	Grupom	39.9%	11.1%	7.4%	4.0%	2.6%	0.6%	0.5%	0.3%	33.5%	± 3.9%
17–20 September	Fortiori	42.8%	12.5%	8.5%	6.3%	4.0%	1.7%	0.5%	0.7%	23.0%	± 4.0%
24–27 September	Fortiori	42.8%	13.1%	6.3%	5.5%	3.2%	1.7%	0.5%	0.2%	26.7%	± 4.0%
25–28 September	Serpes	46.2%	11.4%	5.5%	4.0%	2.4%	1.6%	1.4%	0.4%	27.1%	± 3.46%
26–29 September	Grupom	45.2%	9.8%	9.2%	5.0%	4.7%	1.6%	0.3%	–	24.2%	± 3.9%
1–4 October	Fortiori	46.4%	9.5%	7.2%	7.4%	2.1%	1.3%	0.8%	0.3%	24.8%	± 4.0%
2–5 October	Serpes	46.3%	9.5%	5.9%	6.4%	3.6%	1.1%	0.1%	–	27.1%	± 3.46%
7 October	Election results	46.8%	11.5%	8.3%	8.7%	2.7%	2.5%	0.2%	0.2%	18.72%	–

== Results ==
Results of the Goiânia mayoral election, 2012
Candidate	Votes	%
Paulo Garcia (PT)	349,335	57.68%
Jovair Arantes (PTB)	86,287	14.25%
Simeyzon Silveira (PSC)	65,108	10.75%
Elias Júnior (PMN)	61,930	10.22%
Isaura Lemos (PCdoB)	20,210	3.34%
Reinaldo Pantaleão (PSOL)	19,130	3.16%
José Netho (PPL)	1,894	0.31%
Rubens Donizzeti (PSTU)	1,792	0.30%
Valid votes	605,686	81.28%
Spoilt votes	139,504	18,72%
Total	745,190	100%
