= Adriana Accorsi =

Brazilian jurist, lawyer, and politician

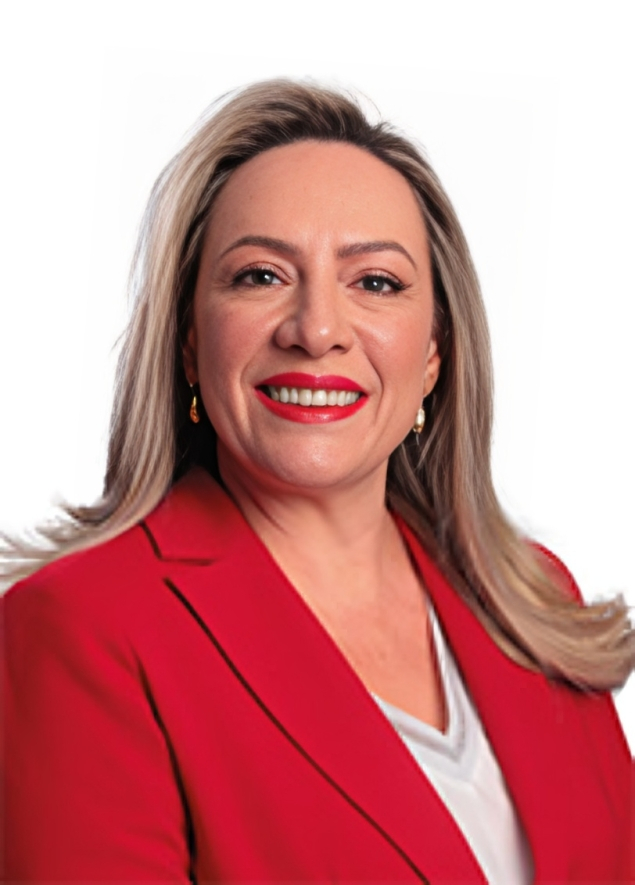
- Accorsi in 2022

Federal deputy of Goiás
- Incumbent
- Assumed office 1 February 2023

State deputy of Goiás
- In office 1 February 2015 – 1 February 2023

Personal details
- Born: Adriana Sauthier Accorsi; 17 March 1973 (age 53) Itapuranga, Goiás, Brasil
- Party: PT (1990–present)
- Spouse: Fábio Fazzion
- Children: 2
- Education: Federal University of Goiás

Adriana Sauthier Accorsi (born 17 March 1973), also known as Delegada Adriana Accorsi, is a Brazilian jurist, lawyer, police chief, union leader, and politician affiliated with the Workers' Party (PT). She is also an activist for the rights of women, children, and adolescents. She was the first woman to become a police chief in the state of Goiás. She is currently a federal deputy from Goiás, and is a member of important commissions such as Public Safety and Combating Organized Crime in the Federal Chamber of Deputies.

== Biography ==
=== Early years ===
Accorsi was born on 17 March 1973 in Itapuranga. Her father was teacher and former mayor of Goiânia Darci Accorsi, and her mother was Lucide Verônica Sauthier Accorsi. Her parents moved from Rio Grande do Sul to Goiás prior to her being born. She has been acquainted with party activism since she was a child. In the 1990s, she became active in political action with the youth wing of the PT, including as president.

She graduated with a law degree from Federal University of Goiás (UFG) and specialized in criminal sciences and public safety management.

Accorsi became a lawyer, only resigning when she was chosen to be the police chief of the State of Goiá in 1999. She worked with the police departments of cities such as Bela Vista, Cristianópolis, Nazário, and Turvânia, among others.

She is married to philosopher Fábio Fazzion, with whom they have two daughters, Verônica and Helena.

=== Professional career ===
In 2003, Accorsi was promoted to titular chief of the Department of the Protection of Children and Adolescents (DPCA), where she stayed for 8 years, investigating and solving crimes, many of them considered to be heinous and that had repercussions throughout Brazil.

In 2011, she became the Superintendent of Human Rights of the Secretary of Public Safety of Goiás (SSP-GO) and had, as her first objective, to monitor investigations pertaining to death squads that had been responsible for hundreds of deaths and dozens of disappearances. In November of that year, she was invited to become the police chief of the Civil Police of the State, the first woman to occupy the post.

On 29 November 2011, she was officially inaugurated as police chief of the Civil Police. Those who attended the ceremony included the newly appointed Commander General of the Military Police, Coronel Edson Costa, Promoter of Justice Tito Amaral, among other police authorities and representatives of the judiciary, legislative assembly, members of the press and other segments of civil society. At the end of the ceremony, Accorsi was paid tribute to by the corporation with the release of rose petals from helicopters by the Civil Police.

Soon enough in the following year, she became the Municipal Secretary of Social Defense, where she also became the chief of the Metropolitan Civil Guard, which has the right to arms for the protection of goods, services and municipal installations, according to what is outlined in the Federal Constitution.

She is the current head of the Special Class Police division of the Civil Police of the State of Goiás.

== Political career ==
Accorsi grew up with the political activism of her parents. She actively participated in her father's campaigns as mayor, as the leader of PT youth.

In January 2013, she was invited by the mayor of Goiânia, Paulo Garcia (PT), to direct the Municipal Secretary of Social Defense.

In 2014, Accorsi became a candidate for state deputy with the Workers' Party having become the first female candidate from the PT to be elected for the position with almost 44,000 votes. In 2016, she became a candidate for the mayoralty of Goiânia, coming in 5th place with 46,103 votes. In the Legislative Assembly of Goiás (ALEGO), she was a member of the commissions on public safety; kids, adolescents, and education; culture; and sport.

She was reelected in 2018, being the 4th most voted for candidate in Goiás, with almost 40,000 votes. She ran again for the mayoralty of Goiânia in 2020, this time reaching 3rd place with 80,715 votes.

In 2022, Accorsi became one of the 10 most voted candidates for federal deputy in her first run for the position, receiving 96,714 votes and becoming the sixth most voted for candidate in the state.

In 2024, she ran again to become the mayor of Goiânia, earning her highest vote share with 168,145 votes.

Her mandate has been marked by her focus on public security and the defense of minorities.
