= Fred Rodrigues (politician) =

Brazilian politician (born 1984)

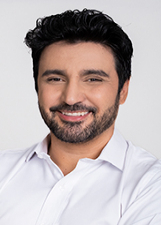
- Rodrigues in 2024

Member of the Legislative Assembly of Goiás
- In office 1 February 2023 – 15 December 2023
- Succeeded by: Cristóvão Vaz Tormin

Personal details
- Born: 25 November 1984 (age 41)
- Party: Liberal Party (since 2024)

Frederico Gustavo Rodrigues da Cunha (born 25 November 1984) is a Brazilian politician. From February to December 2023, he was a member of the Legislative Assembly of Goiás. In the 2024 Goiânia mayoral election, he was a candidate for mayor of Goiânia.
