= 2020 Brazilian municipal elections =

Local elections in Brazil

- 15 November 2020 (first round); 29 November 2020 (second round, if necessary)

5,570 mayors; 56,810 councillors
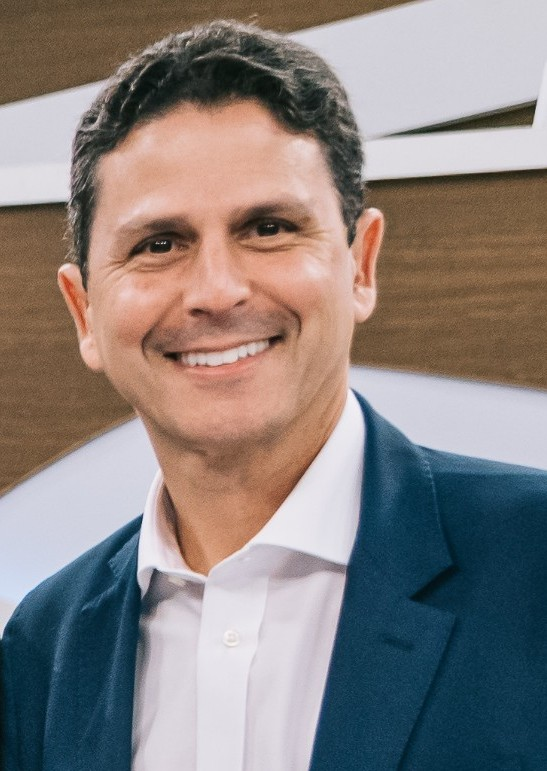

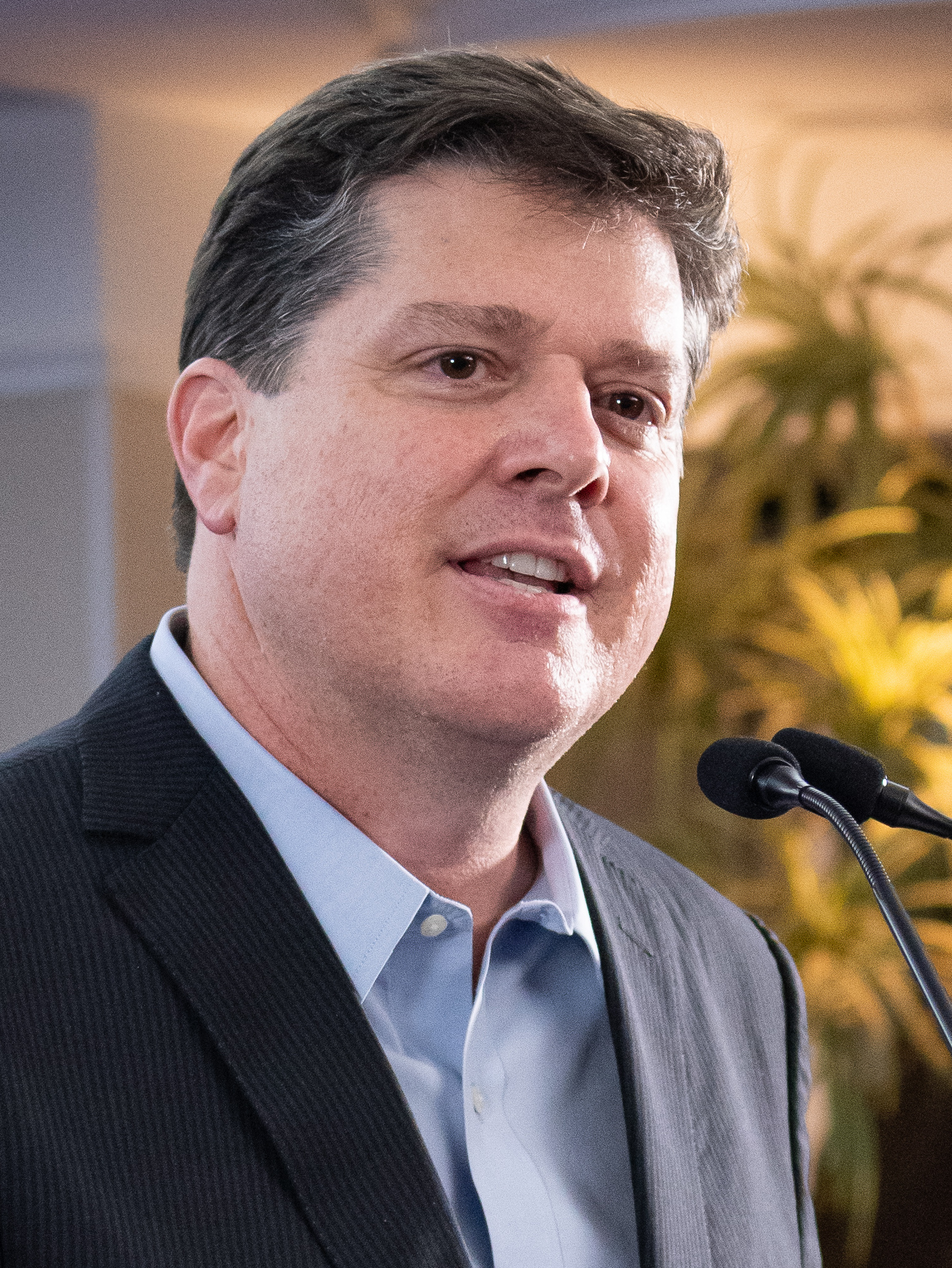

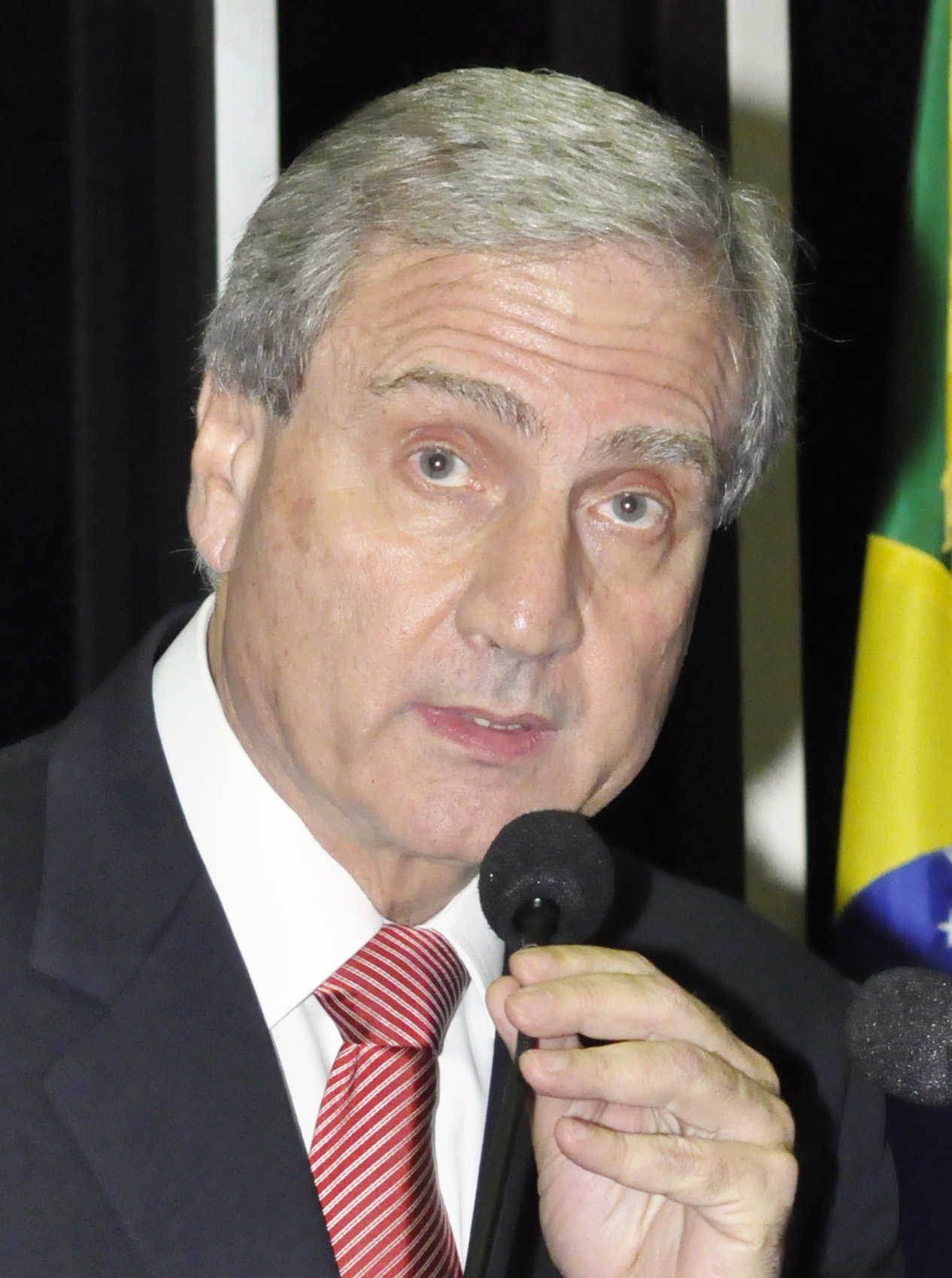

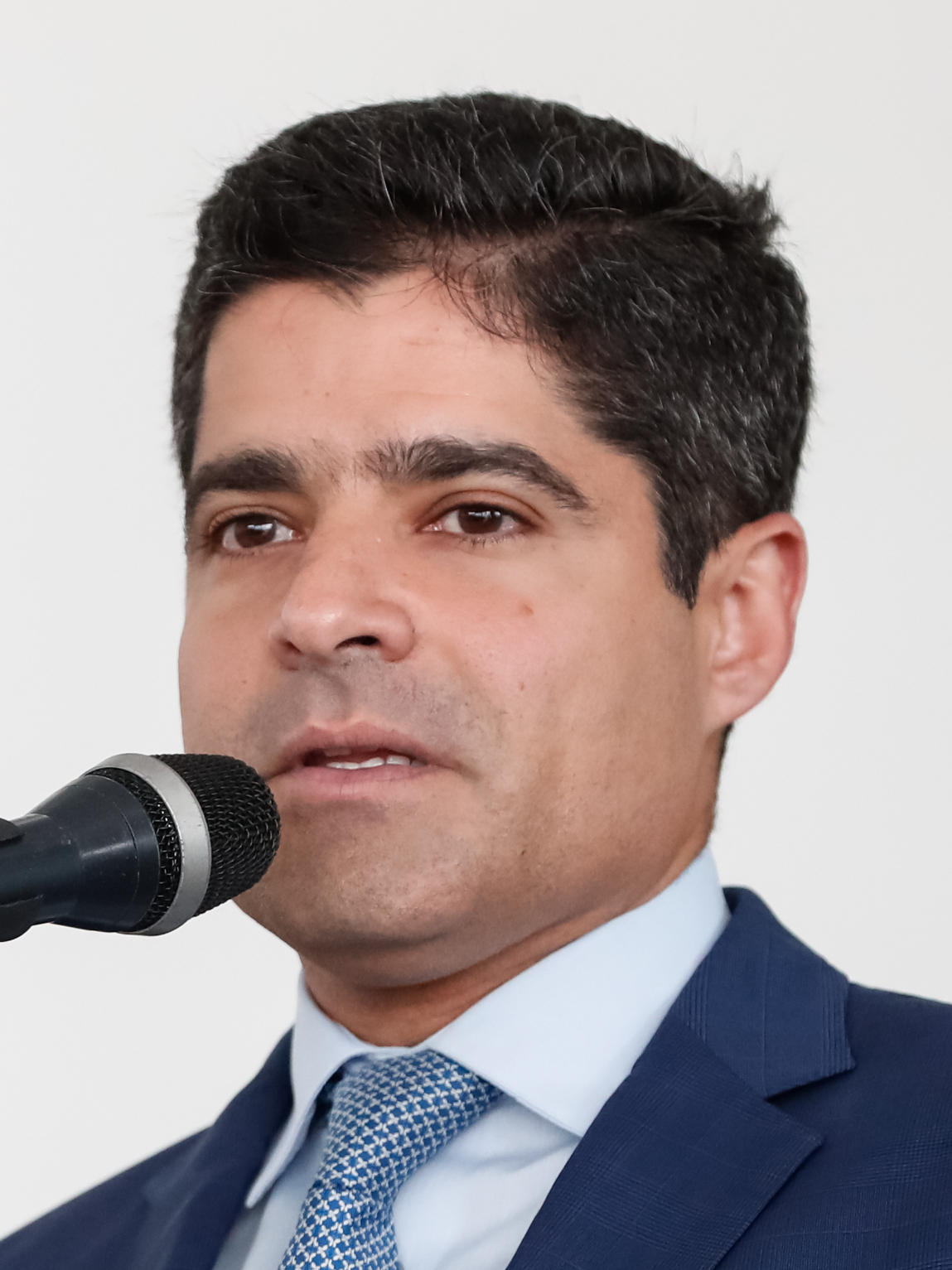

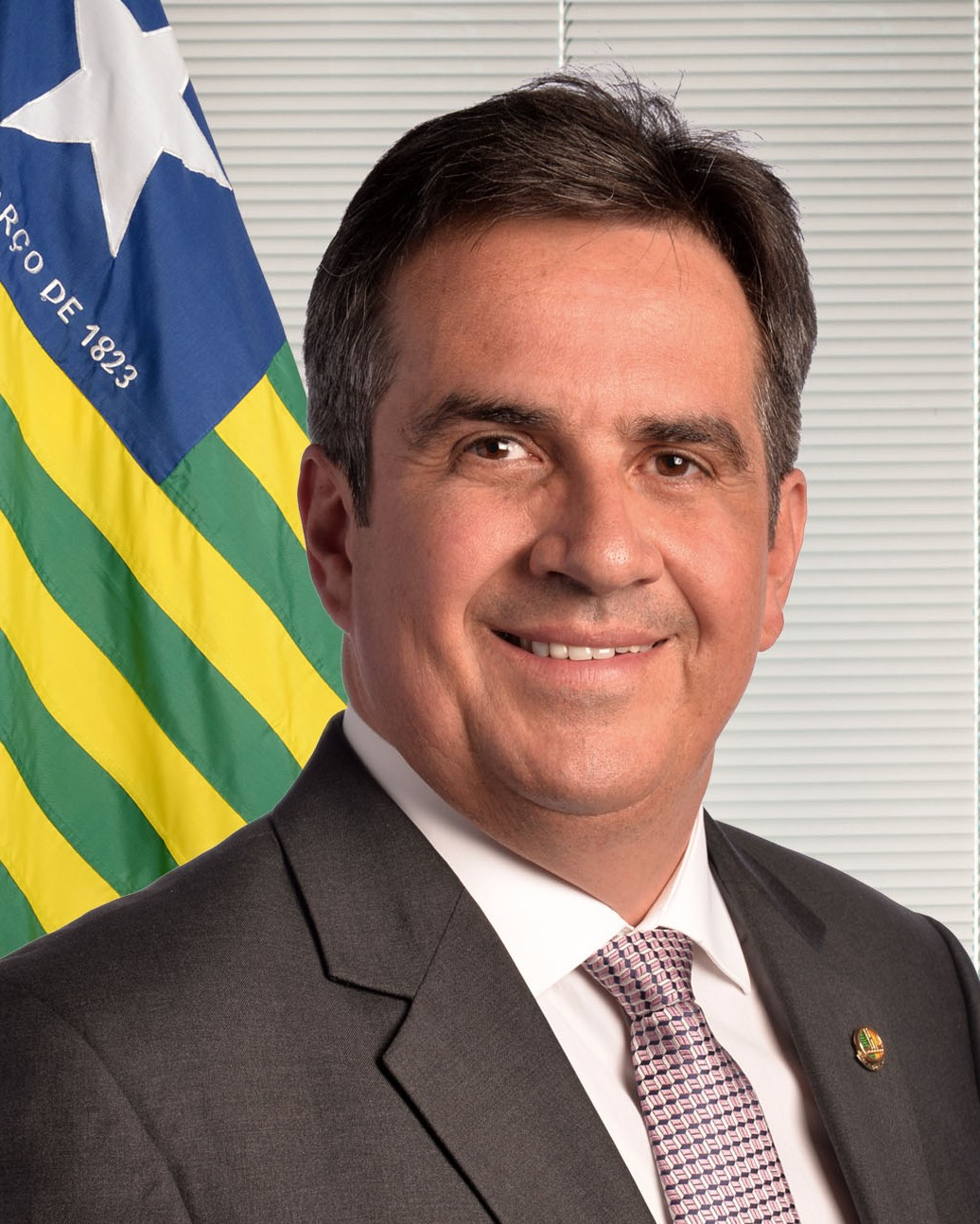

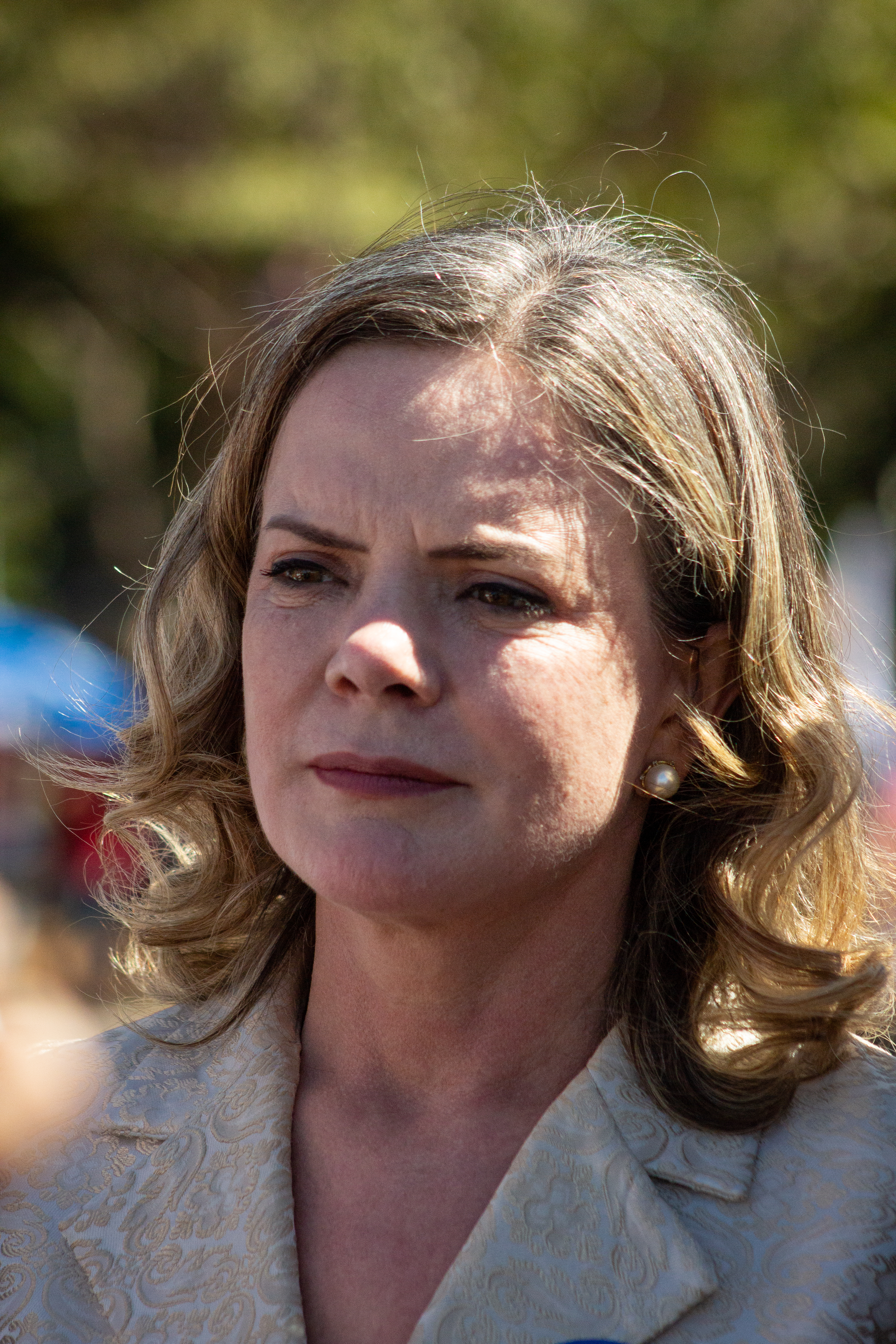
Leader	Bruno Araújo	Baleia Rossi	Alfredo Cotait Neto
Party	PSDB	MDB	PSD
Leader since	31 May 2019	6 October 2019	8 June 2016
Popular vote	10,332,139	10,290,749	10,145,167
Councillors	4,377	7,335	5,694
Councillors +/–	▼987	▼225	▲1,044
Mayors	520	784	654
Mayors +/–	▼265	▼251	▲117
Leader	ACM Neto	Ciro Nogueira	Gleisi Hoffmann
Party	DEM	PP	PT
Leader since	8 March 2018	11 April 2013	5 July 2017
Popular vote	8,066,979	7,372,094	6,684,113
Councillors	4,341	6,346	2,665
Councillors +/–	▲1,436	▲1,603	▼150
Mayors	464	685	183
Mayors +/–	▲198	▲191	▼71

Municipal elections took place in Brazil on 15 November 2020 (and 29 November, for cities with more than 200,000 voters where the second polling date was available). Electors chose Mayors, Vice-Mayors and City Councillors of all 5,568 cities of the country. The partisan conventions took place between 31 August and 16 September. They were the first elections since Bolsonaro's election as President.

== Electoral calendar ==
The Superior Electoral Court defined on 17 December 2019 the Electoral Calendar for 2020 Brazilian municipal election. According to the calendar, the first round should take place on 4 October, and the second round, on 25 October, from 8 am to 5 pm in both cases. Due to the COVID-19 pandemic, however, these dates were moved forward to 15 November and 29 November, respectively.

2020 Electoral Calendar
Date	Event
1 January	Entities or companies conducting polls related to elections or possible candidates are required to register information in the Electoral Polling Registration System up to 5 days before disclosure
1 January	Free distribution of goods, values or benefits by the public administration is prohibited, except in cases of public calamity, state of emergency or social programs authorized by law and already under budget execution in the previous year
1 April	TSE starts to broadcast institutional advertisements on radio and TV to encourage female, youth and black community participation in politics
4 April	Limit for political parties interested in running for election to have the registrations approved by the TSE
15 May	Pre-candidates will be able to make prior fundraising in crowdfunding
4 July	It is forbidden to hire artistic shows paid for with public funds when conducting inaugurations
31 August	Conventions are allowed to choose coalitions and candidates for Mayor, Vice-Mayor and City Councilor
31 August	Last day for the Electoral Justice to disclose the spending limits for each position in dispute
16 September	Last day for conventions for choosing coalitions and candidates for Mayor, Vice Mayor and Councilor
26 September	Last day for parties and coalitions to submit an application for registration of candidates to the Electoral Court
26 September	Date from which electoral propaganda will be allowed, including on the internet
31 October	Date from which no candidate may be arrested or detained, except in flagrante delicto
5 November	Last day for the voter to request a duplicate of the ticket within the electoral domicile
10 November	Date from which no voter can be arrested or detained, except in flagrante delicto or by virtue of a condemnatory criminal sentence for an unspeakable crime
12 November	Last day to broadcast free electoral propaganda on radio and TV for the first round
12 November	Last day for radio and TV debates for the first round
15 November	First Round
27 November	Last day to broadcast free electoral propaganda on radio and TV for the second round
27 November	Last day for radio and TV debates for the second round
29 November	Second Round

== Background ==
The 2020 municipal elections are the first since the general elections of 2018, marking the rise of bolsonarism, a movement in support of President Jair Bolsonaro, and a new political-electoral dynamic emerging on the political scene; in a way, an assessment of the President's electoral strength.

The 2018 general elections, in addition to choosing the President of the Republic, the Governors of State and the Federal District, Senators and Federal, State and District Deputies, granted new mayors to many cities in the country. This happened due to article 14, §6, of the Constitution, establishing that:

To run for other positions, the President of the Republic, the State and Federal District Governors and the Mayors must resign their respective mandates up to six months before the election. — Article 14, §6, of the Constitution of the Federative Republic of Brasil

Thus, many mayors, wishing to run for other positions, had to resign their mandate until 5 April 2018, starting a new management in such municipalities. Those who took on such management would be responsible for the remaining period, that is, until 31 December 2020.

The following mayors resigned from their post to be a candidate for governor in 2018:

- Carlos Amastha (PSB), Mayor of Palmas;
- Carlos Eduardo Alves (PDT), Mayor of Natal;
- Marcus Alexandre (PT), Mayor of Rio Branco;
- João Doria (PSDB), Mayor of São Paulo;
- José Ronaldo (DEM), Mayor of Feira de Santana.

Of the mayors mentioned above, only one was successful, João Dória, the others, in addition to not winning the elections they disputed, lost their positions as Mayor.

In March 2020, a discussion involving the postponement of the election surrounded the Congress, due to the coronavirus pandemic in Brazil. Some mayors and federal deputies propose that the election should be rescheduled to 2021 or 2022, fusing with the 2022 general election. Both President of the Superior Electoral Court, Justice Rosa Weber, and President of the Chamber of Deputies, deputy Rodrigo Maia (DEM-RJ), state that it is "a premature debate" and that it could cause "a very large institutional risk", respectively. Federal deputy Aécio Neves (PSDB-MG) filed in a bill to postpone the election to October 2022 and unify all the elections, reduce the term length for senators to four years, ban re-election for executive seats (president, governors and mayors) and increase their term length to five years.

The year 2020 marks the entry of Generation Z into the electoral race, with the youngest group being between 18 and 20 years old, the increase in the number of applications from religious priests and the multiplication of candidates who present themselves armed and in favor of armamentism.

== Election system ==
=== Mayoral election ===
The mayoral election has a difference depending on the population of the municipality in question. In municipalities with up to 200,000 voters the first-past-the-post system is used, while in municipalities more than 200,000 the two-round system is used, in compliance with article 77 of the Constitution.

The Municipality will be governed by an organic law, voted in two rounds, with a minimum intersection of ten days, and approved by two-thirds of the members of the City Council, who will promulgate it, in compliance with the principles established in this Constitution, in the Constitution of the respective State and the following precepts:

I – election of the Mayor, the Vice-Mayor and the Councilors, for a term of four years, by means of a direct and simultaneous election held throughout the country;

II – election of the Mayor and the Vice-Mayor held on the first Sunday of October of the year preceding the end of the mandate of those who must succeed, applying the rules of art. 77, in the case of Municipalities with more than two hundred thousand voters;

III – inauguration of the Mayor and the Vice-Mayor on 1 January of the year following the election;

IV – for the composition of the City Councils, the maximum limit of:

[Limited number of members of the City Councils in the country according to the number of inhabitants, ranging from 9 councilors (for cities with uo 15,000 people) to 55 councilors (for cities with more than 8,000,000, only one Municipality: São Paulo)]

[...]

— Article 29 of the Constitution of the Federative Republic of Brazil

The election of the President and Vice-President of the Republic will take place, simultaneously, on the first Sunday of October, in the first round, and on the last Sunday of October, in the second round, if any, of the previous year. the end of the current presidential term.

§1. The election of the President of the Republic will import that of the Vice-President registered with him.

§2. The candidate who, registered by a political party, obtains an absolute majority of votes will be considered elected, not counting the blank and null votes.

§3. If no candidate reaches an absolute majority in the first vote, a new election will be held within twenty days after the result is proclaimed, with the two most voted candidates running and the one with the most valid votes being considered elected.

§4. If, before the second round takes place, death, withdrawal or legal impediment of a candidate occurs, the one with the most votes will be called, among the remainder.

§5. If, in the hypothesis of the previous paragraphs, more than one candidate with the same vote remains in second place, the oldest will be qualified.

— Article 77 of the Constitution of the Federative Republic of Brazil.

=== City Council election ===
The election for City Councils uses the system of proportional representation by open list, however, unlike previous elections, there will be no formation of coalitions for Municipal Legislative Powers, so each party will form a separate list.

== Results ==
=== National results ===
Party	Votes	%	Seats			
Party	Votes	%	Mayors	+/-	Councillors	+/-
Brazilian Social Democracy Party	10,332,139	10.53	654	▼265	4377	▼987
Brazilian Democratic Movement	10,290,749	10.49	784	▼251	7335	▼225
Social Democratic Party	10,145,167	10.34	654	▲117	5694	▲1044
Democrats	8,066,979	8.22	464	▲198	4341	▲1436
Progressistas	7,372,094	7.52	685	▲191	6346	▲1603
Workers' Party	6,684,113	6.81	183	▼71	2665	▼150
Brazilian Socialist Party	5,124,512	5.22	252	▼151	3029	▼606
Democratic Labour Party	5,092,367	5.19	314	▼17	3441	▼329
Republicanos	4,860,070	4.95	211	▲108	2601	▲980
Liberal Party	4,552,077	4.64	345	▲54	3467	▲448
Podemos	2,868,355	2.92	102	▲73	1528	▼114
Social Liberal Party	2,764,437	2.82	90	▲60	1205	▲327
Brazilian Labour Party	2,566,179	2.62	212	▼42	2474	▼590
Cidadania	2,511,126	2.56	139	▲22	1585	▼92
Socialism and Liberty Party	2,208,100	2.25	5	▲3	89	▲33
Social Christian Party	2,075,737	2.12	116	▲30	1510	▼18
Patriota	1,900,762	1.94	49	▲36	719	▼420
Solidariedade	1,880,329	1.92	94	▲34	1348	▼90
Avante	1,374,971	1.40	82	▲71	1054	▲565
Republican Party of the Social Order	1,295,213	1.32	41	▼9	754	▼233
Communist Party of Brazil	1,143,941	1.17	46	▼34	697	▼427
Brazilian Labour Renewal Party	831,873	0.85	6	▼3	220	▼171
Green Party	708,641	0.72	47	▼51	805	▼717
New Party	384,333	0.39	1	▲1	29	▲25
Sustainability Network	376,156	0.38	5	▲1	144	▼36
Christian Democracy	224,931	0.23	1	▼7	123	▼296
Christian Labour Party	182,952	0.19	1	▼15	220	▼353
Party of National Mobilization	156,675	0.16	13	▼15	200	▼326
Brazilian Woman's Party	60,445	0.06	1	▼2	46	▼170
United Socialist Workers' Party	33,324	0.03	0	Steady	0	Steady
Popular Unity	16,196	0.02	0	New	0	New
Brazilian Communist Party	2,416	0.00	0	Steady	0	▼1
Workers' Cause Party	1,188	0.00	0	Steady	0	Steady
Total	98,088,547	100.00	5597	–	58046	–
Valid votes	98,088,547	89.94				
Invalid votes	7,054,302	6.47				
Blank votes	3,915,103	3.59				
Total votes	109,057,952	100.00				
Registered voters/turnout	147,918,483	73.73				

=== Results in capitals ===
Capital	State	Mayor	Party	Vice Mayor	Party
Aracaju	Sergipe	Edvaldo Nogueira	PDT	Delegada Katarina	PSD
Belém	Pará	Edmilson Rodrigues	PSOL	Edilson Moura	PT
Belo Horizonte	Minas Gerais	Alexandre Kalil	PSD	Fuad Noman	PSD
Boa Vista	Roraima	Arthur Henrique	MDB	Cássio Gomes	MDB
Campo Grande	Mato Grosso do Sul	Marcos Marcello Trad	PSD	Adriane Lopes	Patriota
Cuiabá	Mato Grosso	Emanuel Pinheiro	MDB	José Roberto Stopa	PV
Curitiba	Paraná	Rafael Greca	DEM	Eduardo Pimentel	PSD
Florianópolis	Santa Catarina	Gean Loureiro	DEM	Topázio Neto	Republicanos
Fortaleza	Ceará	José Sarto	PDT	Élcio Batista	PSB
Goiânia	Goiás	Maguito Vilela	MDB	Rogério Cruz	Republicanos
João Pessoa	Paraíba	Cícero Lucena	PP	Leonardo Bezerra	Cidadania
Macapá	Amapá	Antônio Furlan	Cidadania	Monica Penha	MDB
Maceió	Alagoas	João Henrique Caldas	PSB	Ronaldo Lessa	PDT
Manaus	Amazonas	David Almeida	Avante	Marcos Rotta	DEM
Natal	Rio Grande do Norte	Álvaro Dias	PSDB	Aíla Cortez	PDT
Palmas	Tocantins	Cinthia Ribeiro	PSDB	Lucas Meira	PSB
Porto Alegre	Rio Grande do Sul	Sebastião Melo	MDB	Ricardo Gomes	MDB
Porto Velho	Rondônia	Hildon Chaves	PSDB	Maurício Carvalho	PSDB
Recife	Pernambuco	João Campos	PSB	Isabella de Roldão	PDT
Rio Branco	Acre	Tião Bocalom	PP	Marfiza Galvão	PSD
Rio de Janeiro	Rio de Janeiro	Eduardo Paes	DEM	Nilton Caldeira	PL
Salvador	Bahia	Bruno Soares Reis	DEM	Ana Paula Matos	PDT
São Luís	Maranhão	Eduardo Braide	PODE	Esmênia Miranda	PSD
São Paulo	São Paulo	Bruno Covas	PSDB	Ricardo Nunes	MDB
Teresina	Piauí	José Pessoa Leal	MDB	Robert Rios	PSB
Vitória	Espírito Santo	Lorenzo Pazolini	Republicanos	Estéfane Ferreira	Republicanos
