= Paulo Garcia =

Paulo Garcia may refer to:

- Paulo Garcia (Brazilian politician) (1959–2017), Brazilian neurosurgeon, physician and politician from the Workers' Party
- Paulo Garcia (New Zealand politician), Member of Parliament in the New Zealand House of Representatives
