= Hélio Mauro =

Brazilian politician (1942–2026)

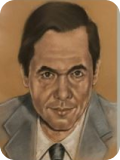
- Mauro in 1978

Mayor of Goiânia
- In office 17 May 1978 – 10 April 1979
- Preceded by: Francisco de Freitas Castro
- Succeeded by: Daniel Antônio de Oliveira

Member of the Chamber of Deputies of Brazil for Goiás
- In office 1 February 1975 – 22 May 1978

Member of the Legislative Assembly of Goiás
- In office 1971–1975

Personal details
- Born: Hélio Mauro Umbelino Lôbo; 19 June 1942 Goiânia, Goiás, Brazil
- Died: 1 January 2026 (aged 83) Anápolis, Goiás, Brazil
- Party: ARENA
- Children: Three
- Occupation: Civil servant

Hélio Mauro Umbelino Lôbo (19 June 1942 – 1 January 2026) was a Brazilian politician. A member of the National Renewal Alliance (ARENA), he served in the Chamber of Deputies from 1975 to 1978 and was mayor of Goiânia from May 1978 to April 1979.

Mauro was born on 19 June 1942 in Goiânia, Brazil. He served in the Legislative Assembly of Goiás from 1971 to 1975 and the federal Chamber of Deputies of Brazil for Goiás from 1975 to 1978 as a member of the ARENA party. In 1978, Goiás Governor Irapuan Costa Júnior appointed him mayor of Goiânia, an office he held from May 1978 until April 1979.

Mauro later served as the Goiás state minister of education and an advisor to Brazilian Senator Jarbas Passarinho.

Mauro died from cardiac arrest in a Anápolis, Goiás, hospital on 1 January 2026, at the age of 83. He had been hospitalized for the prior ten days in the intensive care unit of a private Anápolis hospital. He was survived by his wife, Maria Aída Teixeira Rodrigues da Cunha Lobo, three children, nine grandchildren, and three great-grandchildren. His funeral was held in Brasília.
