= Maguito Vilela =

Brazilian politician (1949–2021)

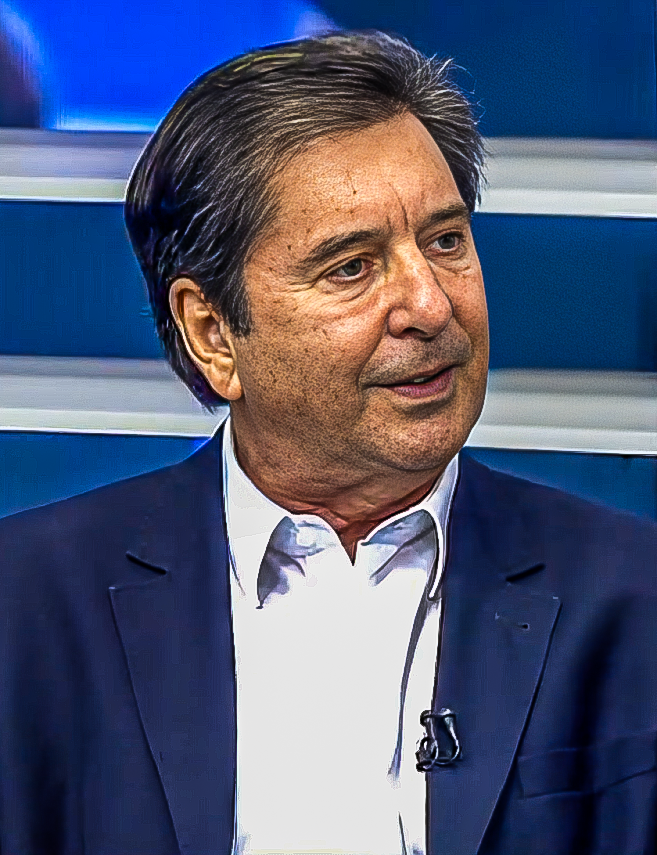

Mayor of Goiânia
- In office 1 January 2021 – 13 January 2021
- Vice Mayor: Rogério Cruz
- Preceded by: Iris Rezende
- Succeeded by: Rogério Cruz

Mayor of Aparecida de Goiânia
- In office 1 January 2009 – 1 January 2017
- Vice Mayor: Tanner de Melo Júnior
- Preceded by: José Macedo de Araújo
- Succeeded by: Gustavo Mendanha

Senator for Goiás
- In office 1 February 1999 – 1 February 2007

Governor of Goiás
- In office 1 January 1995 – 2 April 1998
- Vice Governor: Naphtali Alves
- Preceded by: Agenor Rodrigues
- Succeeded by: Naphtali Alves

Vice Governor of Goiás
- In office 15 March 1991 – 2 April 1994
- Governor: Iris Rezende
- Preceded by: Joaquim Roriz
- Succeeded by: Naphtali Alves

Member of the Chamber of Deputies
- In office 1 February 1987 – 1 February 1991
- Constituency: Goiás

Member of the Legislative Assembly of Goiás
- In office 1 February 1983 – 1 February 1987
- Constituency: At-large

Member of the Municipal Chamber of Jataí
- In office 31 January 1977 – 31 January 1983
- Constituency: At-large

Personal details
- Born: Luís Alberto Maguito Vilela; 24 January 1949; Jataí, Goiás, Brazil
- Died: 13 January 2021 (aged 71); São Paulo, Brazil
- Cause of death: COVID-19
- Political party: ARENA (1975–1979); MDB (1980–2021)
- Children: Daniel Vilela
- Profession: Lawyer, politician

Luís Alberto Maguito Vilela (24 January 1949 – 13 January 2021) was a Brazilian politician who served as a Senator, and was mayor of Goiânia.

== Biography ==
Vilela was a Brazilian politician and lawyer. He was Governor of Goiás from 1995 to 1998. He was also a member of the Brazilian Senate from 1999 to 2007. For a short time in January 2021, Vilela was Mayor of Goiânia.

He died on 13 January 2021, aged 71 in São Paulo from COVID-19 during the COVID-19 pandemic in São Paulo.

Political offices
Preceded by Joaquim Roriz	Vice Governor of Goiás; 1991–1994	Vacant Title next held by Naphtali Alves
Preceded by Agenor Rodrigues	Governor of Goiás; 1995–1998	Succeeded by Naphtali Alves
Preceded by José Macedo de Araújo	Mayor of Aparecida de Goiânia; 2009–2017	Succeeded by Gustavo Mendanha
Preceded by Iris Rezende	Mayor of Goiânia; 2021	Succeeded by Rogério Cruz
