= Iris Rezende =

Brazilian politician (1933–2021)

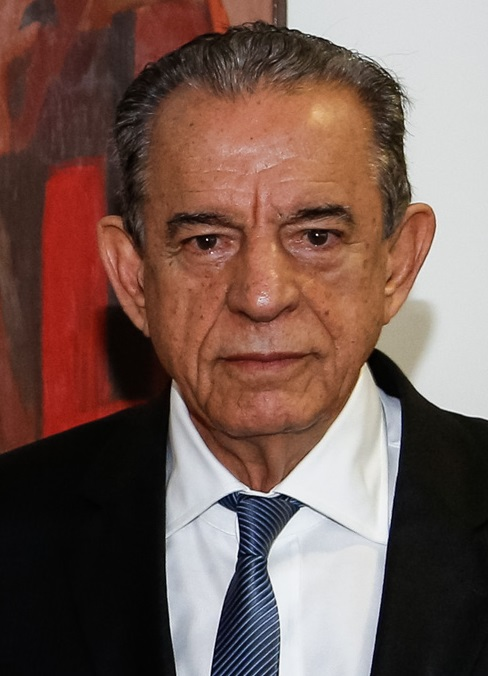
- Rezende in 2017

Mayor of Goiânia
- In office 1 January 2017 – 9 November 2021
- Vice Mayor: Junio Alves Araújo (2017–2019); Vacant (2019–present)
- Preceded by: Paulo Garcia
- Succeeded by: Rogério Cruz
- In office 1 January 2005 – 1 April 2010
- Vice Mayor: Valdivino Oliveira (2005–2009); Paulo Garcia (2009–2010)
- Preceded by: Pedro Wilson Guimarães
- Succeeded by: Paulo Garcia
- In office 31 January 1966 – 20 October 1969
- Preceded by: Hélio Seixo de Brito
- Succeeded by: Leonino Caiado

Senator for Goiás
- In office 1 February 1995 – 1 February 2003

Minister of Justice
- In office 22 May 1997 – 1 April 1998
- President: Fernando Henrique Cardoso
- Preceded by: Milton Seligman
- Succeeded by: José de Jesus Filho

Minister of Agriculture
- In office 14 February 1986 – 15 March 1990
- President: José Sarney
- Preceded by: Pedro Simon
- Succeeded by: Bernardo Cabral

Governor of Goiás
- In office 15 March 1983 – 13 February 1986
- Vice Governor: Onofre Quinan
- Preceded by: Ary Valadão
- Succeeded by: Onofre Quinan
- In office 15 March 1991 – 2 April 1994
- Vice Governor: Maguito Vilela
- Preceded by: Henrique Santillo
- Succeeded by: Agenor Rezende

Personal details
- Born: Iris Rezende Machado; 22 December 1933; Cristianópolis, Goiás, Brazil
- Died: 9 November 2021 (aged 87); São Paulo, Brazil
- Political party: MDB (1958–2021)
- Spouse: Iris de Araújo

Iris Rezende Machado (22 December 1933 – 9 November 2021) was a Brazilian politician who was a member of the Brazilian Democratic Movement (MDB).

== Biography ==
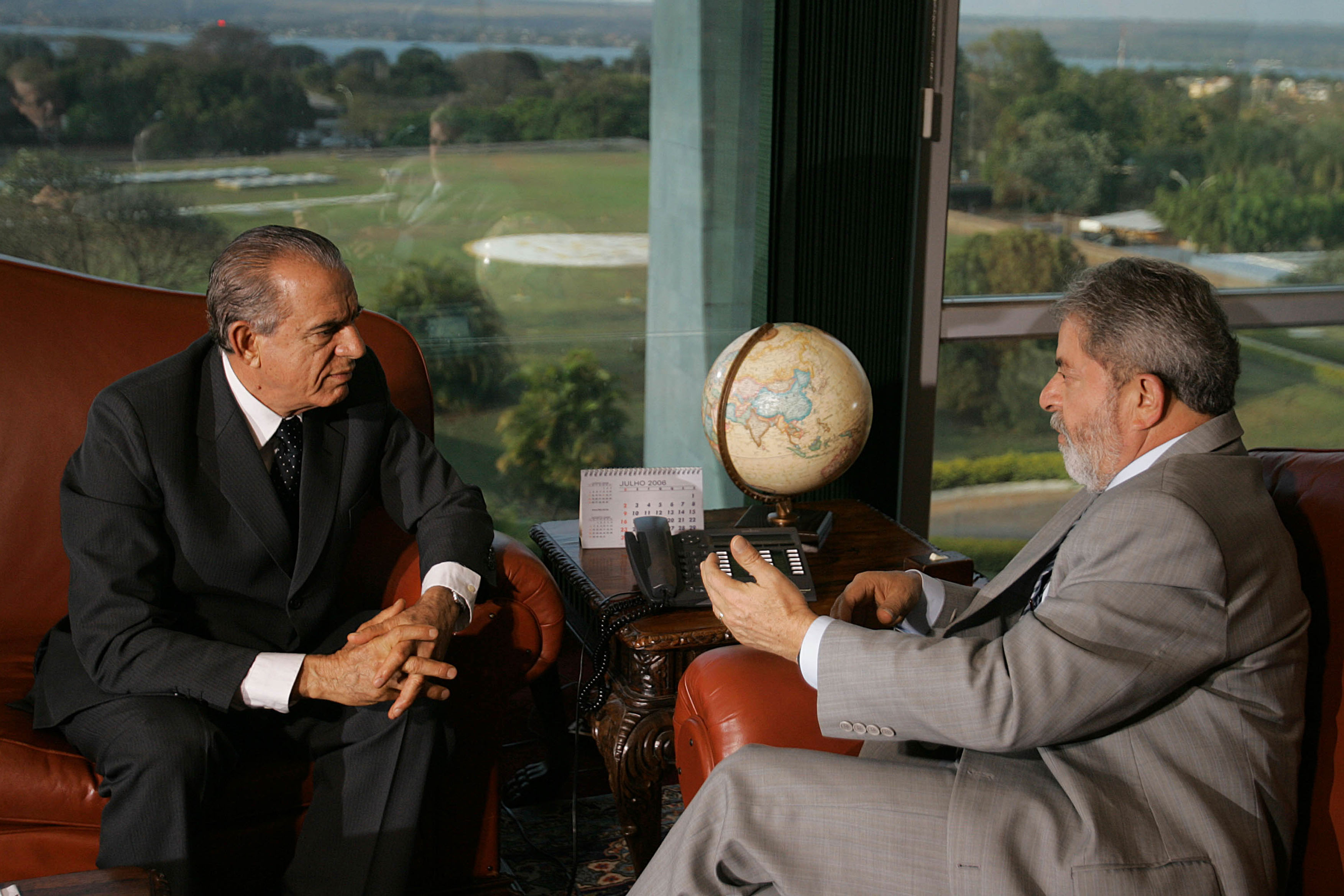
Iris and president Lula in 2005.

Rezende made his career in the state of Goiás, being City Councillor and Mayor of Goiânia, State Deputy in Goiás, State Governor for two terms, Minister of Agriculture during José Sarney government, and Minister of Justice in the government of Fernando Henrique Cardoso. He was married to Homonymous Íris Araújo. City Councillor in 1958, State Deputy in 1962, and Mayor of Goiânia in 1965, Rezende was removed from office by the military regime in 1969.

He was elected Governor of Goiás in 1982, but resigned after his nomination for the Ministry of Agriculture by president Sarney. Rejzende returned to the State Government in 1991, where he remained in office until his second resignation in 1994 to run for the Federal Senate. He was elected to the Senate and took office in 1995.

In 1997, Renzende was invited to become the Minister of Justice by president Fernando Henrique Cardoso.

In 1998, Rezende ran for governor again, but lost the election to Marconi Perillo (PSDB). In 2002, he ran for re-election as Senator with Mauro Miranda (PMDB), but both lost their seats to Demóstenes Torres (PFL) and Lucia Vânia (PSDB).

In 2004, Rezende ran for Mayor of Goiânia one more time, gathering 299,272 votes, or 47.47% of the valid votes, qualifying for the second round. Weeks later, he beat the incumbent Mayor Pedro Wilson (PT), with 56% of the valid votes.

He was re-elected Mayor of Goiânia in the 2008 elections. On 1 April 2010, he resigned to run for Governor of Goiás in the same year election. The incumbent Vice Mayor Paulo Garcia took office as mayor. In October, Rezende was defeated again by Marconi Perillo in the second round.

In February 2013, the Justice Court of Goiás reformed a 1st instance decision, acquitting Rezende of the charges of administrative improbity.

Rezende was elected Mayor of Goiânia for the fourth time in the second round of the 2016 elections. He gathered 57.70% of the valid votes.

Political offices
Preceded by Ary Valadão	Governor of Goiás; 1983–1986; 1991–1994	Succeeded by Onofre Quinan
Preceded by Henrique Santillo	Governor of Goiás; 1983–1986; 1991–1994	Succeeded by Agenor Rezende
Preceded by Pedro Simon	Minister of Agriculture; 1986–1990	Succeeded by Bernardo Cabral
Preceded by Milton Seligman	Minister of Justice; 1997–1998	Succeeded by José de Jesus Filho
Preceded by Hélio Seixo de Brito	Mayor of Goiânia; 1966–1969; 2005–2010; 2017–2021	Succeeded by Leonino Caiado
Preceded by Pedro Wilson Guimarães	Mayor of Goiânia; 1966–1969; 2005–2010; 2017–2021	Succeeded by Paulo Garcia
Preceded by Paulo Garcia	Mayor of Goiânia; 1966–1969; 2005–2010; 2017–2021	Succeeded by Rogério Cruz
