= 2012 Brazilian municipal elections =

- October 7, 2012

Mayors and councillors of all the 5,568 municipalities of Brazil
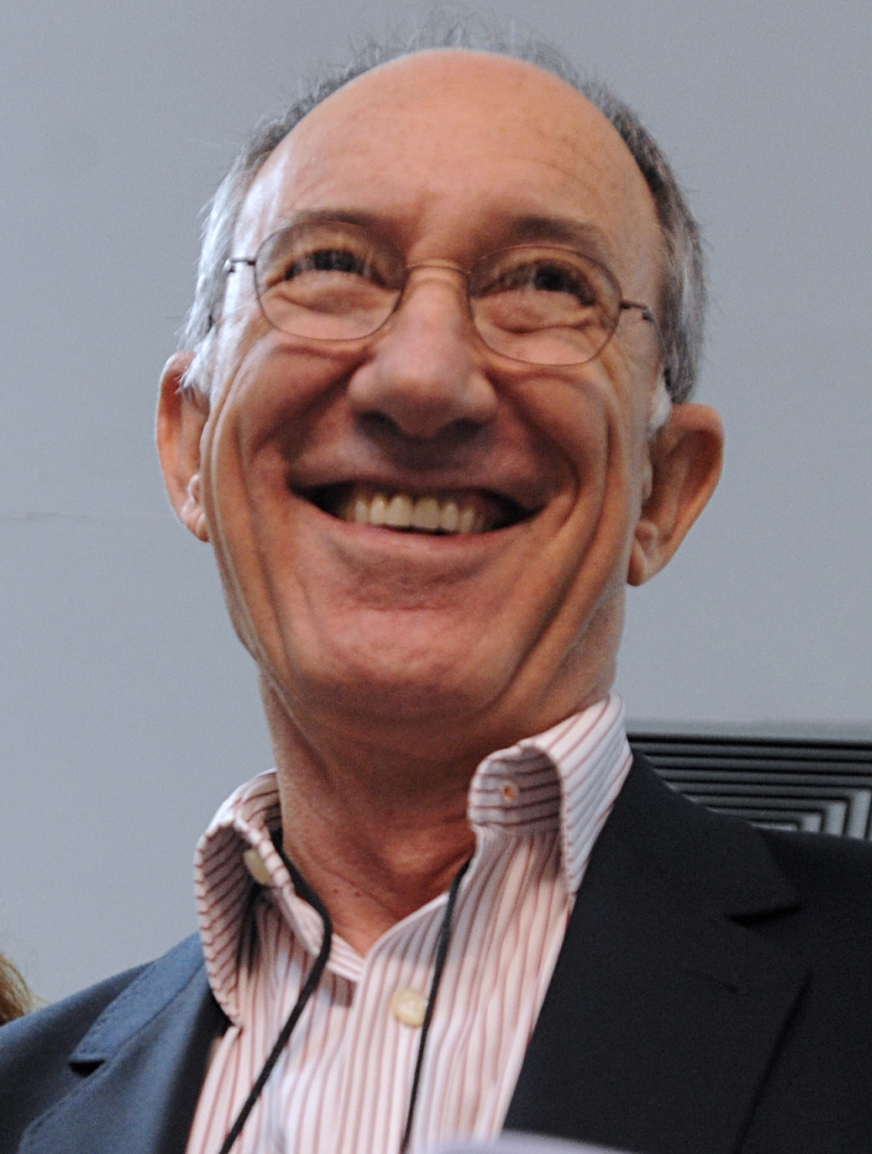

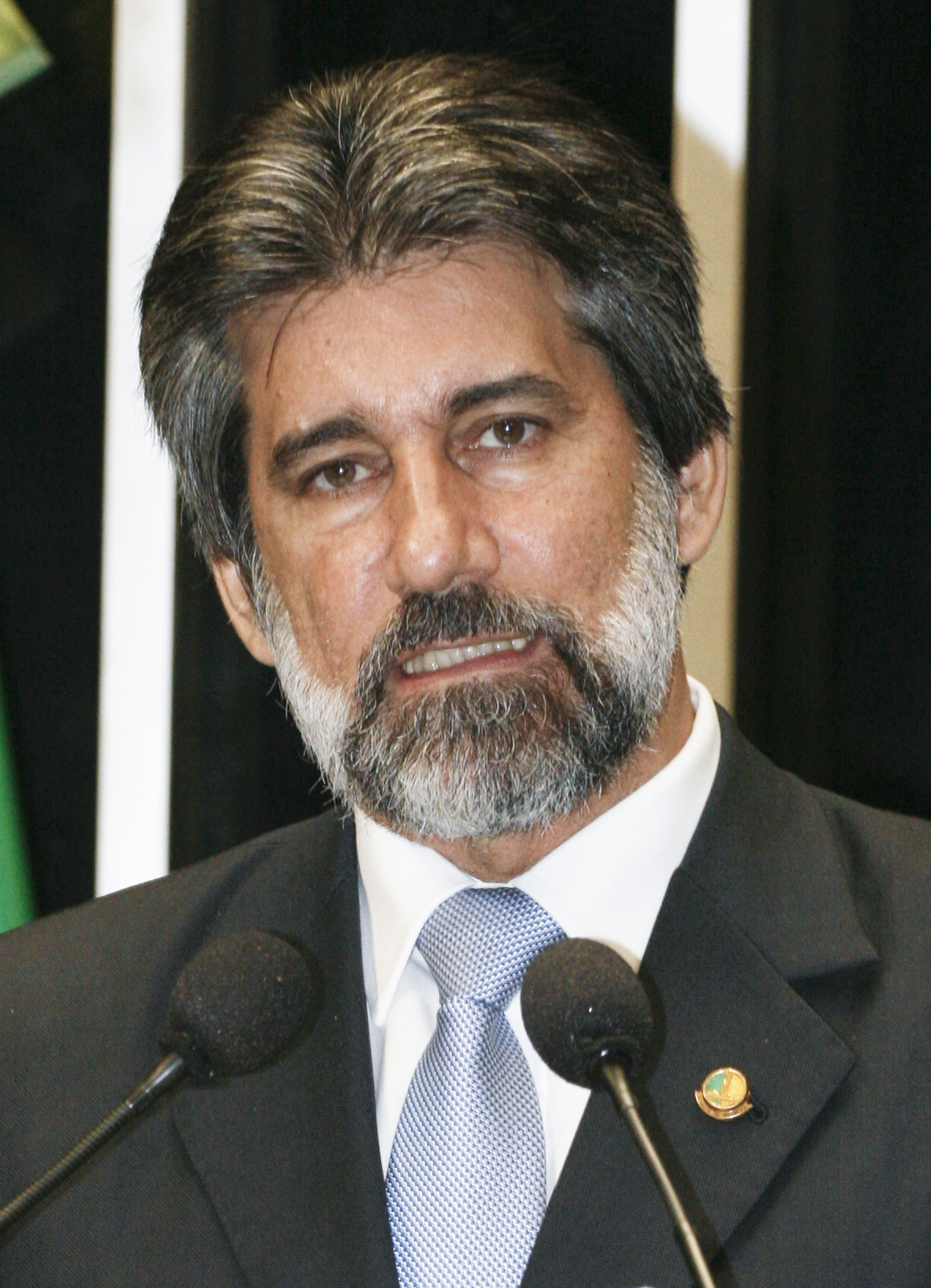

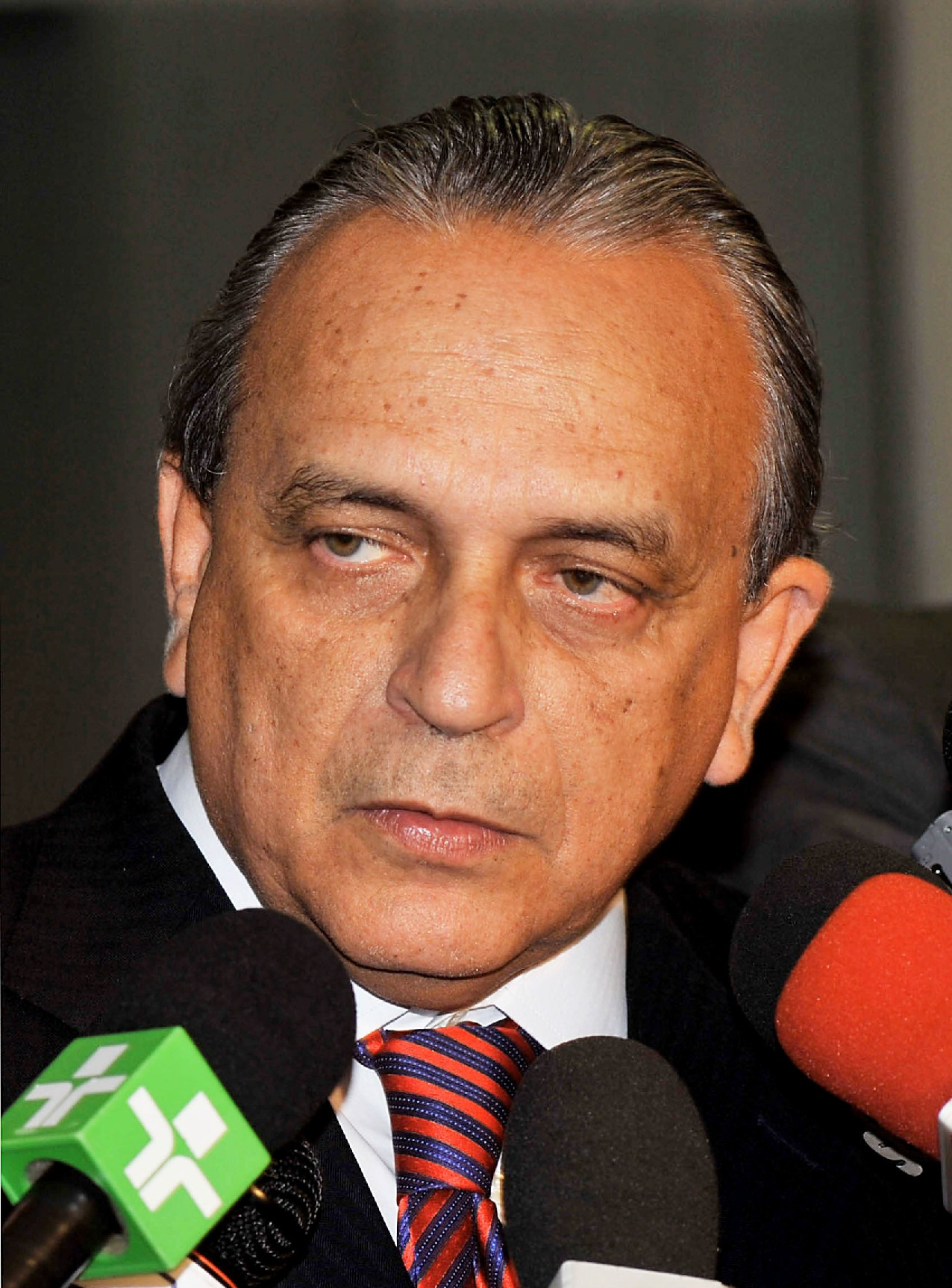

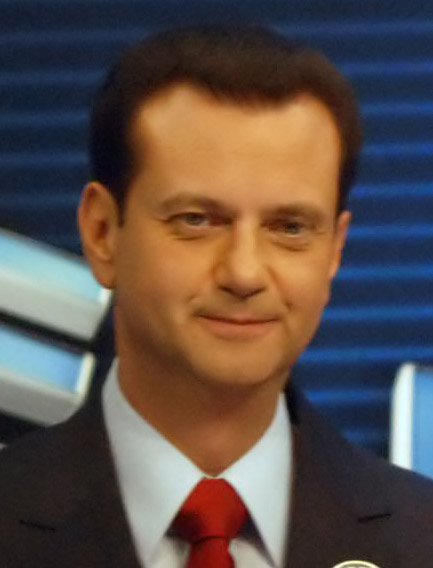

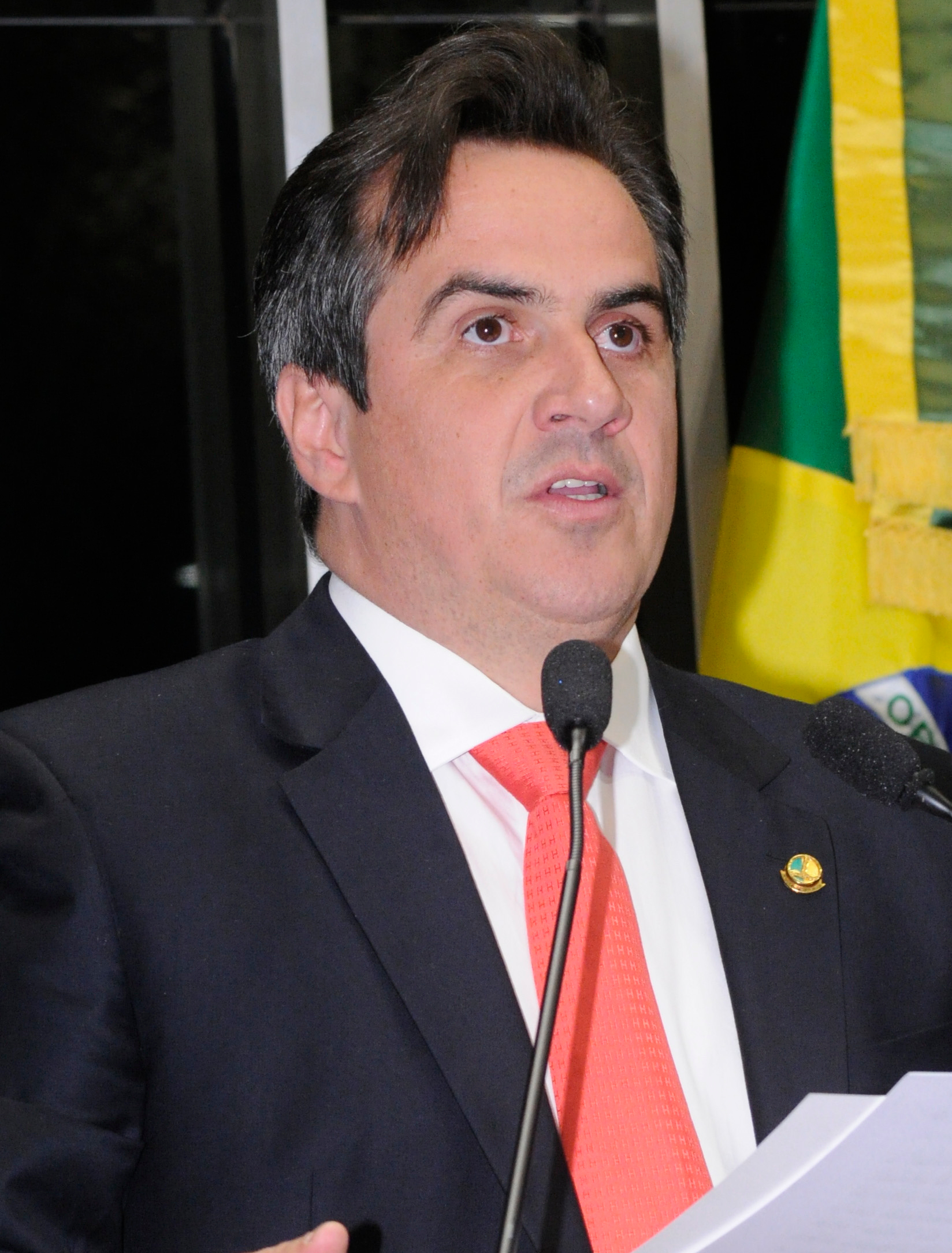

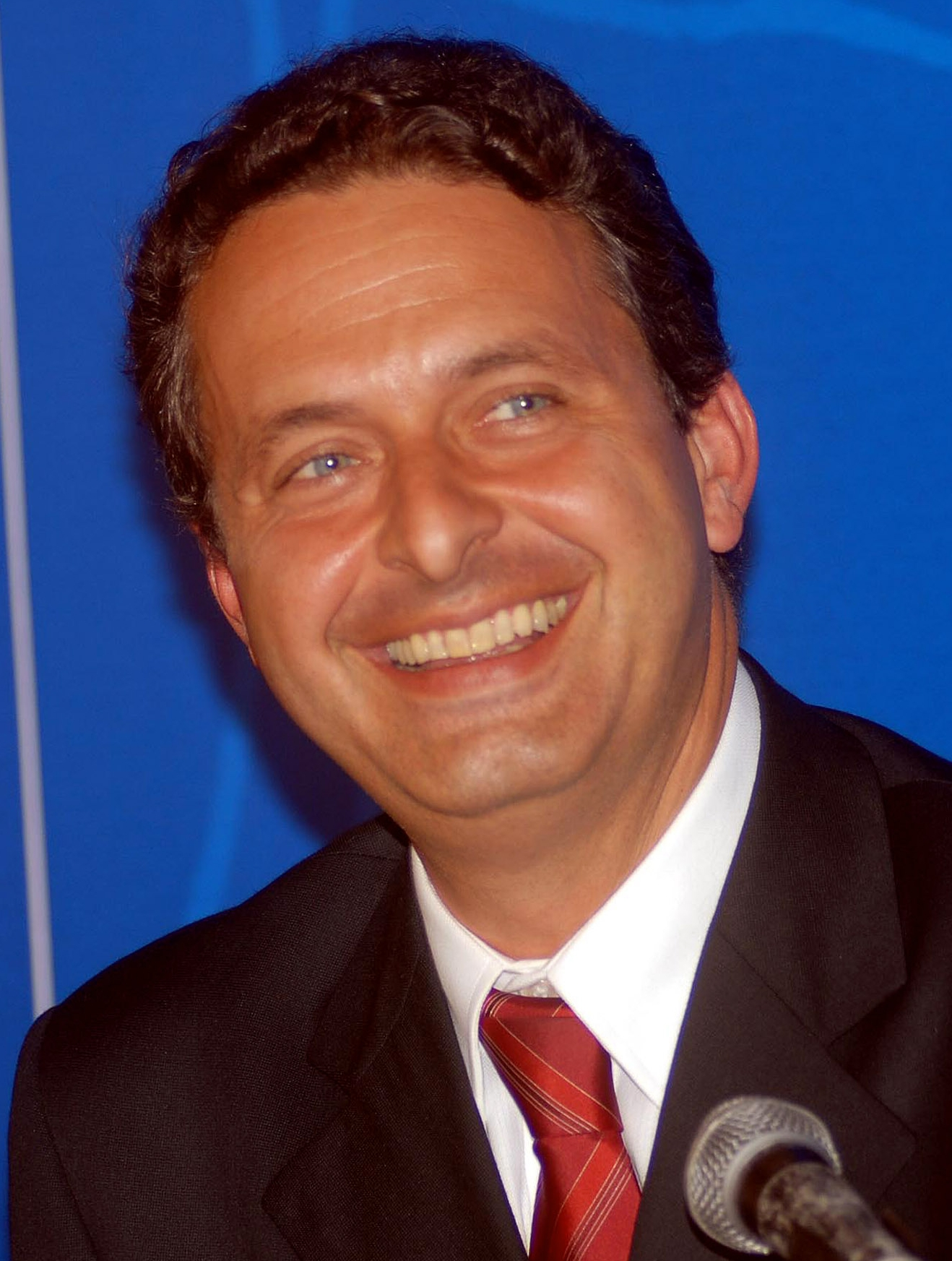
	Majority party	Minority party	Third party
Leader	Rui Falcão	Valdir Raupp	Sérgio Guerra
Party	PT	MDB	PSDB
Last election	550 mayors	1,193 mayors	787 mayors
Seats won	628	1,025	693
Seat change	+78	–168	–94
Popular vote	17,260,000	16,716,000	13,950,000
Percentage	16.79%	16.26%	13.57%
	Fourth party	Fifth party	Sixth party
Leader	Gilberto Kassab	Ciro Nogueira	Eduardo Campos
Party	PSD	PP	PSB
Last election	not contest	551 mayors	310 mayors
Seats won	490	469	443
Seat change	+490	-82	+133

The Brazilian municipal elections of 2012 took place on October 7 and on October 28 (for cities with more than 200,000 voters, where the second round is available). Over 138 million voters chose mayors, deputy mayors and city councillors for the 5,568 municipalities of Brazil. These were the first elections in which the recently registered parties Partido Pátria Livre (PPL) and Partido Social Democrático (PSD) participated; they were both recognized by the Superior Electoral Court (Tribunal Superior Eleitoral – TSE) in 2011. Political parties whose candidates wished to run for the 2012 elections had to be registered at the TSE for at least one year before the election date, while candidates also had to be affiliated to a party for the same period of time. Conventions for the selection of candidates within the parties occurred between 10 and 30 June, while the registry of candidates and alliances with the Regional Electoral Courts (Tribunais Regionais Eleitorais – TREs) took place until July 5. Electoral campaign was authorized from the moment a candidacy had been registered. The free electoral program (propaganda eleitoral gratuita) – two daily slots on free-to-air TV and radio for political advertising paid by the Electoral Justice fund – ran weekdays from 21 August until 4 October. According to the current Brazilian electoral law, the two-round system – should the leading candidate receive less than 50% +1 of the votes – is only available for cities with more than 200,000 voters. This includes all state capitals, with the exception of Boa Vista, Roraima and Palmas, Tocantins, plus 59 other municipalities. The free electoral program for the second round ran from 13 October until 26 October.

Below is a list of the cities where the runoff took place (bold denote state capitals). These cities are home to 31 725 967 of the country's total constituency of 140 646 446 registered electors; that is, 22.56% of Brazilian voters went to the polling stations on October 28.

- **Belém**, Pará
- Belford Roxo, Rio de Janeiro
- Blumenau, Santa Catarina
- Campina Grande, Paraíba
- Campinas, São Paulo
- **Campo Grande**, Mato Grosso do Sul
- Cariacica, Espírito Santo
- Cascavel, Paraná
- Contagem, Minas Gerais
- **Cuiabá**, Mato Grosso
- **Curitiba**, Paraná
- Diadema, São Paulo
- Duque de Caxias, Rio de Janeiro
- **Florianópolis**, Santa Catarina
- **Fortaleza**, Ceará
- Franca, São Paulo
- Guarujá, São Paulo
- Guarulhos, São Paulo
- **João Pessoa**, Paraíba
- Joinville, Santa Catarina
- Juiz de Fora, Minas Gerais
- Jundiaí, São Paulo
- Londrina, Paraná
- **Macapá**, Amapá
- **Manaus**, Amazonas
- Maringá, Paraná
- Mauá, São Paulo
- Montes Claros, Minas Gerais
- **Natal**, Rio Grande do Norte
- Niterói, Rio de Janeiro
- Nova Iguaçu, Rio de Janeiro
- Pelotas, Rio Grande do Sul
- Petrópolis, Rio de Janeiro
- Ponta Grossa, Paraná
- **Porto Velho**, Rondônia
- Ribeirão Preto, São Paulo
- Santo André, São Paulo
- **Rio Branco**, Acre
- **Salvador**, Bahia
- São Gonçalo, Rio de Janeiro
- **São Luís**, Maranhão
- **São Paulo**, São Paulo
- Sorocaba, São Paulo
- Taubaté, São Paulo
- **Teresina**, Piauí
- Uberaba, Minas Gerais
- Vila Velha, Espírito Santo
- **Vitória**, Espírito Santo
- Vitória da Conquista, Bahia
- Volta Redonda, Rio de Janeiro

== Election results ==
The following tables' contents can also be found at the Superior Electoral Court website.

=== Mayoral elections ===
Mayoral elections, October 7 and October 28
Party number and name	Candidates elected in 1st round	Candidates elected in 2nd round
25 (DEM)	273	2
65 (PCdoB)	52	3
21 (PCB)	0	0
29 (PCO)	0	0
12 (PDT)	305	3
31 (PHS)	16	0
15 (PMDB)	1014	6
33 (PMN)	43	0
11 (PP)	467	2
54 (PPL)	11	0
23 (PPS)	120	3
22 (PR)	272	1
10 (PRB)	79	1
44 (PRP)	24	0
28 (PRTB)	16	0
40 (PSB)	434	6
20 (PSC)	83	0
55 (PSD)	491	3
45 (PSDB)	699	9
27 (PSDC)	9	0
17 (PSL)	23	0
50 (PSOL)	1	1
16 (PSTU)	0	0
13 (PT)	623	8
70 (PTdoB)	24	0
14 (PTB)	293	0
36 (PTC)	18	1
19 (PTN)	12	0
43 (PV)	94	1

=== City councillors' elections ===
City councillors' elections, October 7
Party number and name	Candidates elected
25 (DEM)	3267
65 (PCdoB)	972
21 (PCB)	5
29 (PCO)	0
12 (PDT)	3657
31 (PHS)	547
15 (PMDB)	7944
33 (PMN)	604
11 (PP)	4927
54 (PPL)	177
23 (PPS)	1855
22 (PR)	3175
10 (PRB)	1205
44 (PRP)	579
28 (PRTB)	414
40 (PSB)	3548
20 (PSC)	1462
55 (PSD)	4655
45 (PSDB)	5251
27 (PSDC)	446
17 (PSL)	755
50 (PSOL)	49
16 (PSTU)	2
13 (PT)	5174
70 (PTdoB)	534
14 (PTB)	3572
36 (PTC)	484
19 (PTN)	429
43 (PV)	1575

== See also ==
- 2012 Goiânia mayoral election
