= List of mayors of Goiânia =

The following is a list of mayors of the city of Goiânia, in Goiás state, Brazil.

- Venerando de Freitas Borges, 1935–1945, 1951-1955
- Ismerindo Soares de Carvalho, 1945–1946, 1947
- Orivaldo Borges Leão, 1946-1947
- Eurico Viana, 1947-1951
- Messias de Souza Costa, 1955
- João de Paula Teixeira Filho, 1955-1959
- Jaime Câmara, 1959-1961
- Hélio Seixo de Brito, 1961-1966
- Íris Rezende, 1966–1969, 2005–2010, 2017–2020
- Leonino Caiado, 1969-1970
- Manuel dos Reis e Silva, 1970-1974
- Rubens Vieira Guerra, 1974-1975
- Francisco de Freitas Castro, 1975-1978
- Hélio Mauro, 17 May 1978 – 10 April 1979
- Daniel Antônio de Oliveira, 1979, 1986–1987, 1988
- Índio do Brasil Artiaga Lima, 1979-1982
- Goianésio Ferreira Lucas, 1982-1983
- Daniel Borges do Campo, 1983
- Nion Albernaz, 1983–1985, 1989–1992, 1997-2000
- Joaquim Roriz, 1987-1988
- Darci Accorsi, 1993-1996
- Pedro Wilson Guimarães, 2001-2004
- Paulo Garcia, 2010-2016
- Maguito Vilela, 2021
- Rogério Cruz, 2021-2025
- Sandro Mabel, 2025-present

== See also ==
- Câmara Municipal de Goiânia (city council)
- List of municipal elections in Goiânia
- Goiânia history
- Goiânia history (in Portuguese)
- History of Goiás (state)
- List of mayors of largest cities in Brazil (in Portuguese)
- List of mayors of capitals of Brazil (in Portuguese)
