= Bruno Peixoto =

Brazilian politician (born 1974)

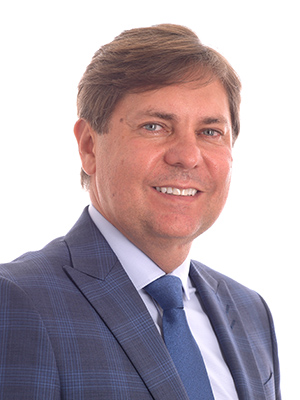
- Peixoto in 2023

President of the Legislative Assembly of Goiás
- Incumbent
- Assumed office 1 February 2023
- Preceded by: Lissauer Vieira

Personal details
- Born: 16 May 1974 (age 52)
- Party: Brazil Union (since 2022)

Bruno Regiany Peixoto Pimenta (born 16 May 1974) is a Brazilian politician serving as a member of the Legislative Assembly of Goiás since 2011. He has served as president of the assembly since 2023.
