= Helenês Cândido =

Brazilian politician (1935–2021)

Helenês Cândido (5 January 1935 – 17 March 2021) was a Brazilian lawyer and politician, who served as the governor of the state of Goiás between 1998 and 1999.

Cândido died from COVID-19 at age 86 in Caldas Novas on 17 March 2021.
