= 2010 Goiás gubernatorial election =

- October 31, 2010; Second round
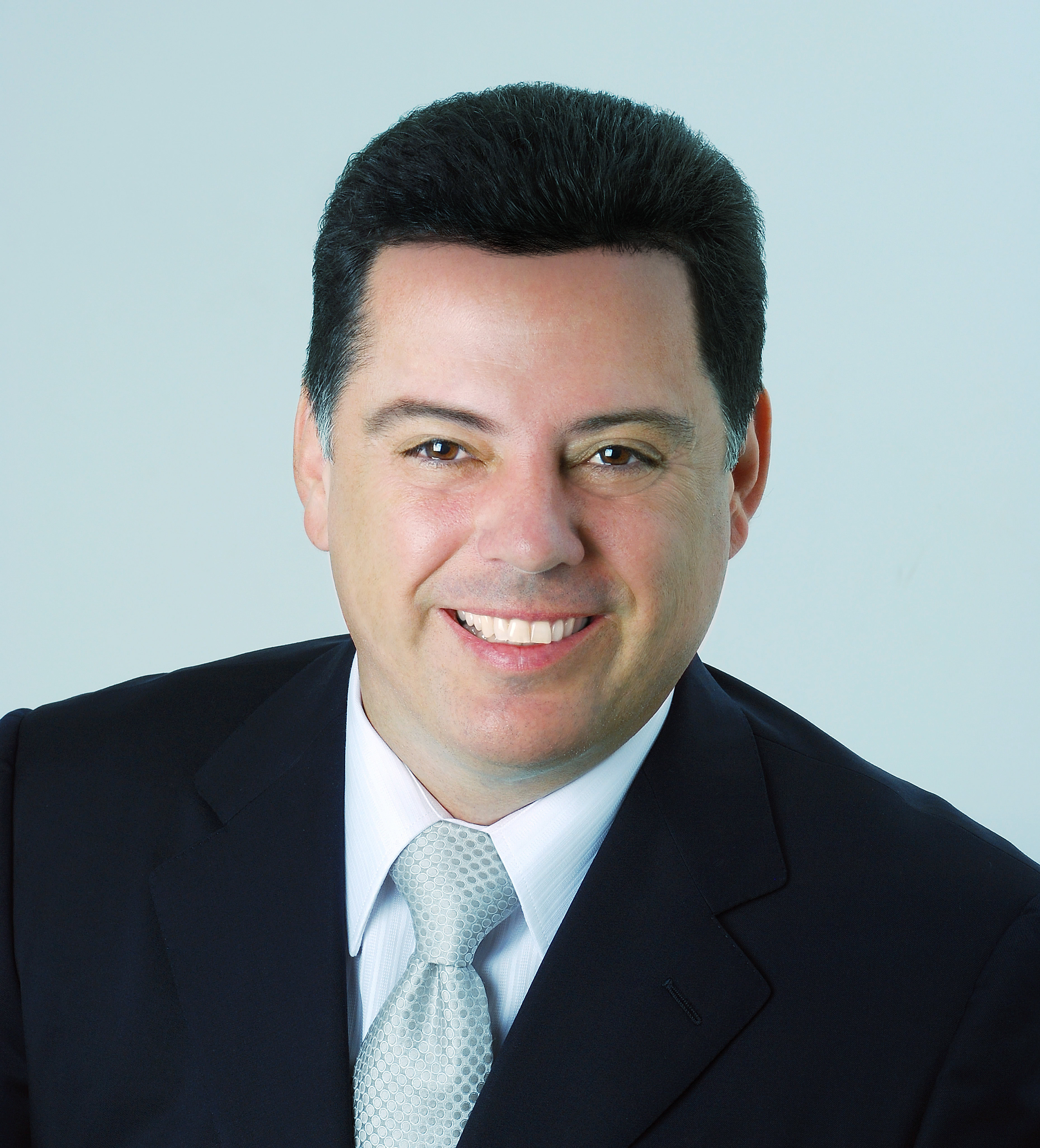

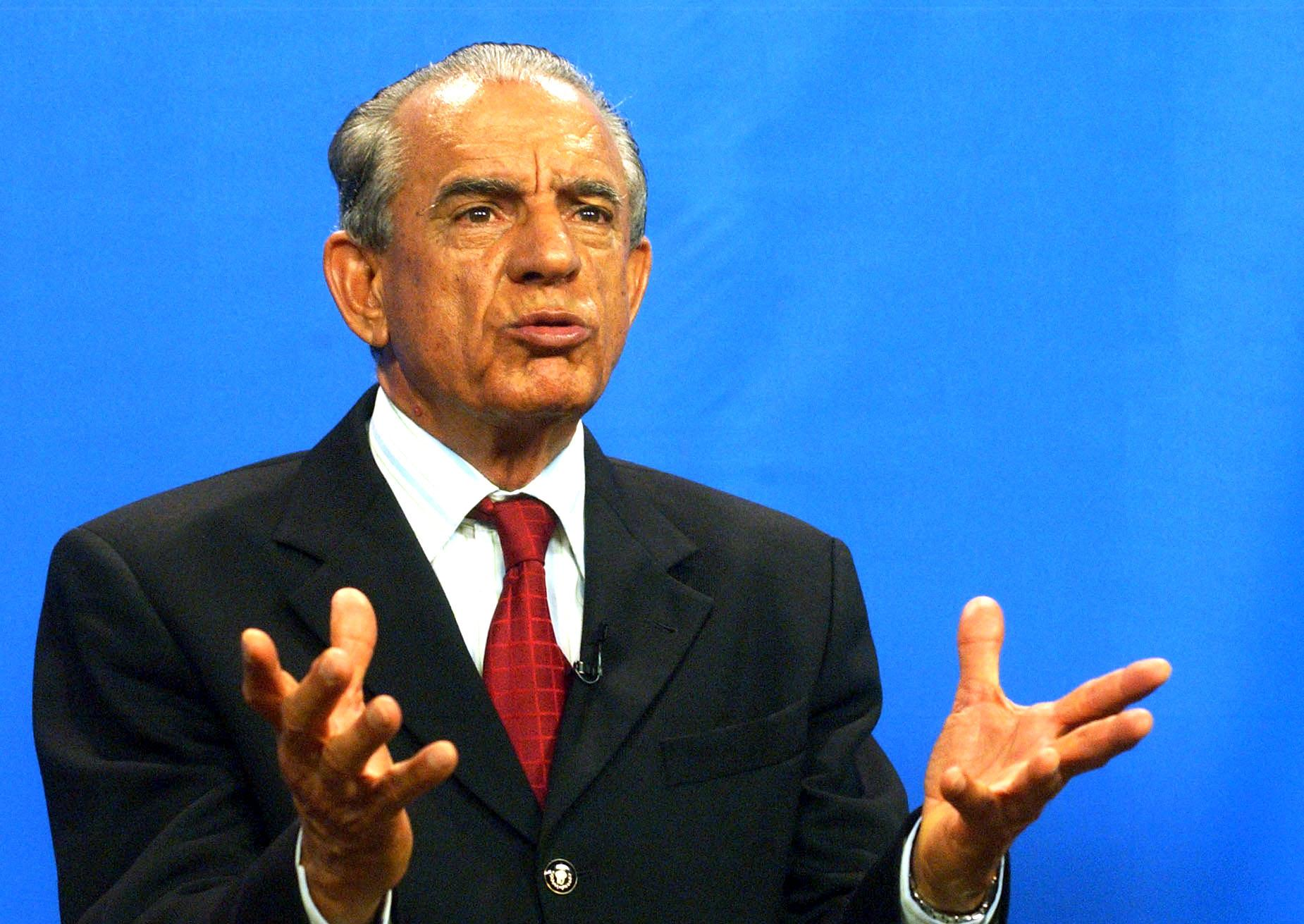
| Nominee | Marconi Perillo | Iris Rezende |
| Party | PSDB | MDB |
| Popular vote | 1.551.132 | 1.376.188 |
| Percentage | 52,99% | 47,01% |
Governor before election
Alcides Rodrigues
PP
Elected Governor
Marconi Perillo
PSDB

The 2010 Goiás gubernatorial election was held on October 3, as part of the general election in Brazil. In this election, four million citizens from the state of Goiás were eligible to vote to determine the successor to incumbent Governor Alcides Rodrigues, from the center-right Progressive Party (PP).

Because of term limits, Rodrigues was constitutionally forbidden to run once he finished Marconi Perillo's term, which he assumed in 2006 when Perillo left the office to run for the Senate. During his administration, Rodrigues parted ways with his predecessor, and went on to support the candidacy of Vanderlan Cardoso, the former mayor of Senador Canedo, from the Republic Party (PR). Despite the Governor's support for Cardoso, the leading candidates were former Governors Iris Rezende of the Brazilian Democratic Movement Party (PMDB), and Marconi Perillo of the Brazilian Social Democratic Party (PSDB). Other candidates included Washington Fraga from the Socialism and Liberty Party (PSOL) and Marta Jane from the Brazilian Communist Party (PCB).

As none of the candidates received more than half of the valid votes, a run-off was held on October 31, 2010.

On October 3, citizens from Goiás voted for their representatives in both Federal (Chamber of Deputies and Senate) and local level (Legislative Assembly) legislatures, in addition to the next President of Brazil.

== Opinion polling ==
| Date | Institute | Candidate | | | | | None / Undecided |
| Date | Institute | Marconi Perillo (PSDB) | Iris Rezende (PMDB) | Vanderlan Cardoso (PR) | Washington Fraga (PSOL) | Marta Jane (PCB) | None / Undecided |
|---|---|---|---|---|---|---|---|
| August 19–12, 2010 | Ibope | 45% | 34% | 5% | 0% | 0% | 15% |
| July 5–9, 2010 | Serpes | 46,1% | 39,3% | 6,5% | 0,3% | 1,2% | 6,7% |
| April 10–25, 2010 | Ecope | 50% | 38.9% | 3.1% | 0.5% | – | 7.5% |
| April 7–13, 2010 | Serpes | 43.7% | 39.9% | 3.7% | 0.3% | – | 12.5% |
| September 30, 2009 | Ecope | 50% | 31.5% | – | 0.4% | – | 12.4% |
