= Marconi Perillo =

Brazilian politician

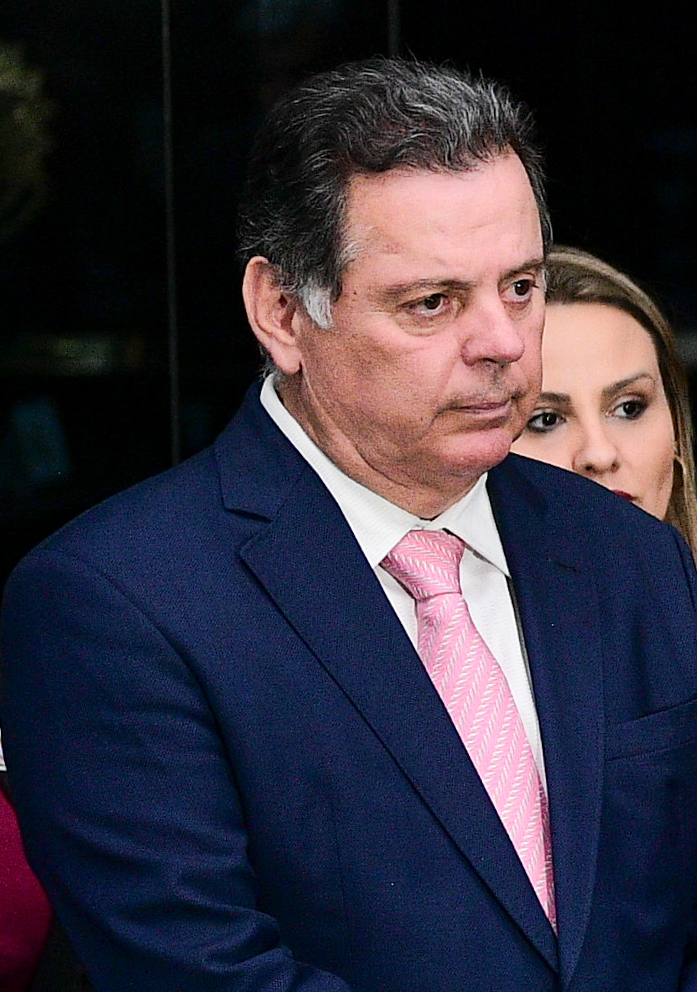

Governor of Goiás
- In office 1 January 2011 – 7 April 2018
- Vice Governor: José Eliton
- Preceded by: Alcides Rodrigues
- Succeeded by: José Eliton
- In office 1 January 1999 – 1 April 2006
- Vice Governor: Alcides Rodrigues
- Preceded by: Helenês Cândido
- Succeeded by: Alcides Rodrigues

National President of the Brazilian Social Democracy Party
- In office 30 November 2023 – 27 November 2025
- Preceded by: Eduardo Leite
- Succeeded by: Aécio Neves

Senator for Goiás
- In office 1 February 2007 – 17 December 2010

First Vice President of the Federal Senate
- In office 2 February 2009 – 17 December 2010
- President: José Sarney
- Preceded by: Tião Viana
- Succeeded by: Marta Suplicy

Federal Deputy
- In office 1 February 1995 – 1 February 1999
- Constituency: Goiás

State Deputy of Goiás
- In office 1 February 1991 – 1 February 1995
- Constituency: At-large

Personal details
- Born: Marconi Ferreira Perillo Júnior; 7 March 1963 (age 63) Palmeiras de Goiás, Goiás, Brazil
- Party: PSDB (1995–present)
- Other political affiliations: PMDB (1982–1992); PST (1992–1993); PP (1993–1995)
- Awards: Order of Military Merit (Grand Officer)

Marconi Ferreira Perillo Júnior (born in Goiânia, March 7, 1963) is a Brazilian politician, affiliate to the Brazilian Social Democracy Party (PSDB). He is the former governor of the state of Goiás (1999–2002; 2003–2006; 2011–2018) and president of the PSDB since November 2023.

== Biography ==
Marconi Ferreira Perillo Júnior was born in Goiânia, in the maternity Maternidade de Maio, on March 7, 1963, but was raised in Palmeiras de Goiás, where he consider his hometown. First born son of the merchant Marconi Ferreira Perillo and the housewife Maria Pires Perillo, he has also three other siblings: Antônio, Vânia and Tatiana.

He went to Elementary School in the Public School of Palmeira de Goiás (1970–1978). At age 14 he had his first formal job, as a helper on the 2º Ofício de Notas em Palmeiras notary's Office.

At the age of 15, he went live with his uncle Jorge e Maria Conceição, in the city of Goiânia, to keep studying.

In Goiânia, he went to high school in Pré-Médico College (1978–1980). In the capital, he made friends in the artistic and intellectual scene, as with Nars Chaul, Bororó, João Caetano, and others, due to his closeness to his cousin Fernando Perillo, who is a MPB singer.

In 1980 he was approved in the Universidade Federal de Goiás to the course of Social Science. In 1982 he was approved in the Universidade Brás Cubas, at Mogi das Cruzes (SP) to the course of Industrial engineer. In 1985, got a spot on UCG Law School.

Marconi even started the courses that he was approved but he abandoned them because of his work and his political involvement.

It was on the Legislature that he met Valéria Jaime Peixoto, whom he married in 1989 and had two daughters, Isabela and Ana Luísa.

He finished law school in 2010 at Faculdade Alves Faria.

== Political trajectory ==
Marconi Perillo started his political career in the political party Partido do Movimento Democrático Brasileiro (PMDB). And in two opportunities he was the leader on the young division of his political party, PMDB Jovem (1985–1987 and 1987–1989), in this period his also worked as a member for the state directory . He was the personal assistant to Goias governor Henrique Santillo in 1987 till 1991 and as State Deputy in 1991 till 1995.

In 1992, Perillo and Santillo, with other leaders from PMDB, join another political party called Partido Social Trabalhista (PST), until 1993, when the political party PST with other political party named Partido Trabalhista Renovador (PTR) formalized a union, creating a new political party called Partido Progressista (PP). In 1994, Perillo is elected Federal Deputy for PP, being the 6th most voted.

In 1998, Perillo was elected governor for the political party Partido da Social Democracia Brasileira (PSDB) at age 35, becoming the youngest state governor in Brazil. In this election, the polls indicated a great favoritism to the ex-governor and then senator Iris Rezende, former political party colleague with Perillo, and that time main political leader. With the slogan “Tempo novo” (New Times) for the political scenario, Perillo unexpectedly defeated Iris on the elections second round and then claimed the state governor of Goiás, being reelected in 2002 in the first round. In 2006 didn't finish his mandate, to run as a senator. He was elected with 75% of the votes and contributed to the election of this successor, his vice governor Alcides Rodrigues to the state governor spot.

== 2010 elections ==
On October 3, 2010, he received 1,400,227 votes (46,33% of valid votes), making him able to run second round against Iris Rezende of PMDB in October 31 of the same year, then he was elected state governor of Goiás for the third time in history, receiving 1,551,132 votes (52,99% of the valid votes).

== Corruption ==
In open inquiry in the Supreme Court (STF), Marconi Perillo is investigated on suspicion of having received R$2 million bribe at the time was governor of the state of Goiás from 1999 to 2006.

Political offices
Preceded by Helenês Cândido	Governor of Goiás; 1999–2006	Succeeded by Alcides Rodrigues
Preceded by Tião Viana	First Vice President of the Federal Senate; 2009–2010	Vacant Title next held by Marta Suplicy
Preceded by Alcides Rodrigues	Governor of Goiás; 2011–2018	Succeeded by José Eliton
Party political offices
Preceded by Eduardo Leite	National President of the Brazilian Social Democracy Party; 2023–2025	Succeeded by Aécio Neves
