= Sandro Mabel =

Brazilian politician (born 1958)

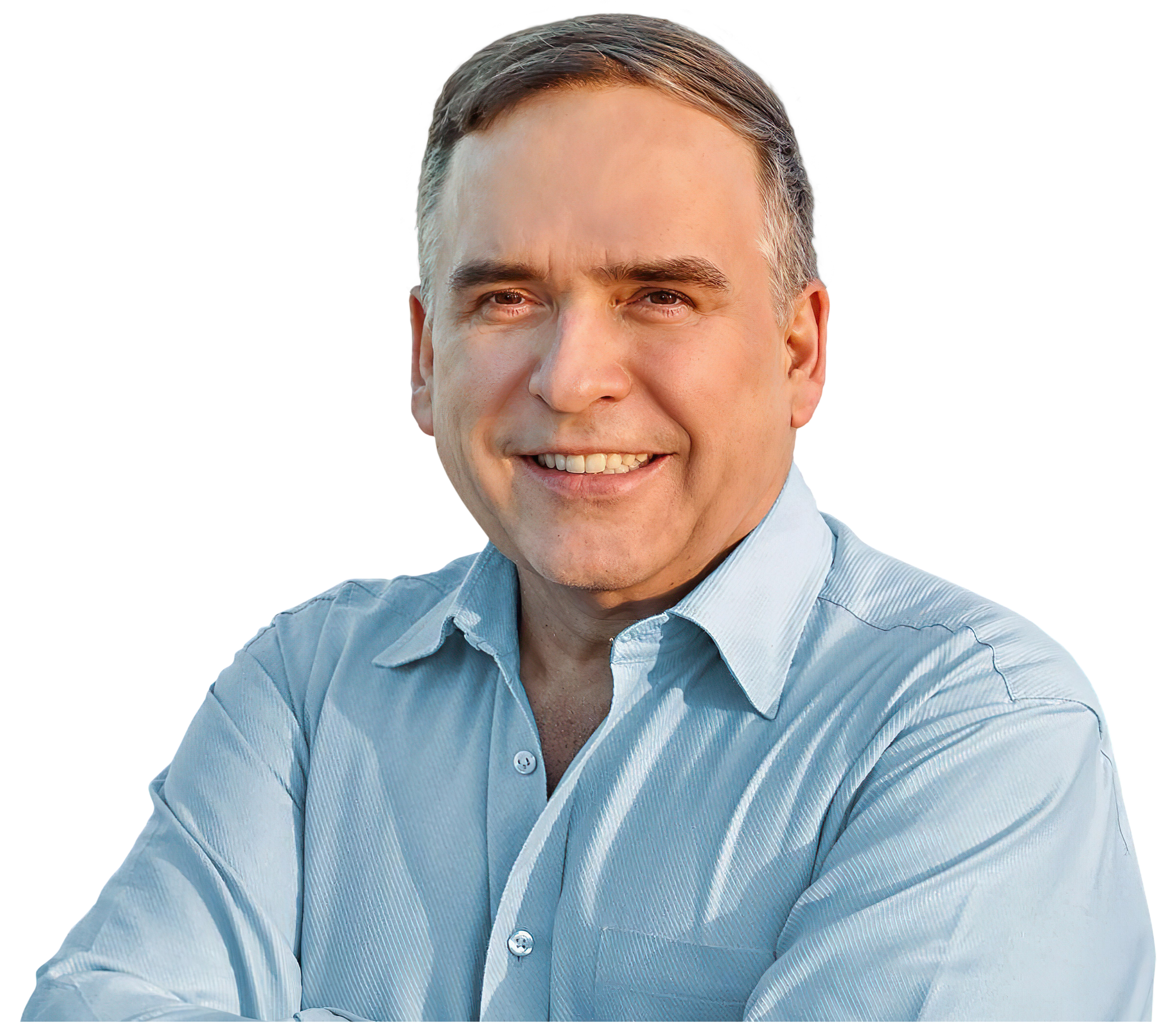
- Mabel in 2024

Mayor of Goiânia
- Incumbent
- Assumed office 1 January 2025
- Preceded by: Rogério Cruz

Personal details
- Born: 31 December 1958 (age 67)
- Party: Brazil Union (since 2024)

Sandro da Mabel Antonio Scodro (born 31 December 1958) is a Brazilian politician serving as mayor of Goiânia since 2025. He was a member of the Chamber of Deputies from 1995 to 1999 and from 2003 to 2015. From 1991 to 1995, he was a member of the Legislative Assembly of Goiás.
