= Rogério Cruz =

Brazilian Evangelical pastor and politician (born 1966)

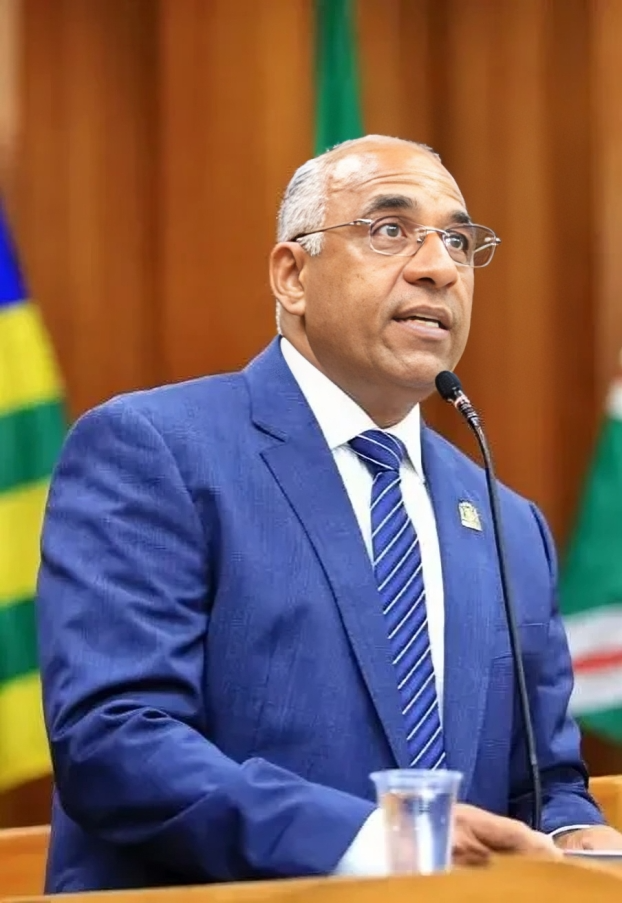
- Rogério Cruz in 2024.

Mayor of Goiânia
- In office 13 January 2021 – 31 December 2024
- Preceded by: Maguito Vilela
- Succeeded by: Sandro Mabel

Vice-mayor of Goiânia
- In office 1 January 2021 – 13 January 2021
- Preceded by: Major Araújo
- Succeeded by: Vacant

Councilman of Goiânia
- In office 1 January 2013 – 1 January 2021

Personal details
- Born: Rogério Oliveira da Cruz; 1 September 1966 (age 60) Duque de Caxias, Rio de Janeiro, Brazil
- Party: Republicanos (2010–present)
- Education: Universidade Paulista
- Occupation: Evangelical pastor, radio personality, politician

Rogério Oliveira da Cruz (born 1 September 1966) is a Brazilian Evangelical pastor affiliated with the Universal Church of the Kingdom of God, radio personality, and politician who was the mayor of Goiânia from 2021 to 2024. He was the first Black mayor of the city. Affiliated with the Republicanos, he initially was a councilman and later vice-mayor of the city, but took over after the death of then-mayor Maguito Vilela.

== Early life and career ==
Cruz was born in Duque de Caxias, Rio de Janeiro in 1966. He is married to Thelma Cruz. He graduated with a degree in public management from Universidade Paulista (UNIP). He was an administrator and radio talk show host during his years with Grupo Record, as well as with the Universal Church of the Kingdom of God, of which he is a member and pastor of. In this manner, he has experience in radio and TV on the African continent, where he was responsible for the broadcasting of Record Internacional in Angola and Mozambique. He had served with the company as executive director for 16 years.

In recognition of his humanitarian actions, he received the title of Honorary Associate of the Rotary Club of Goiânia in 2022.

== Political career ==
=== Councilman (2012–2020) ===
In 2010, Cruz moved to Goiânia, where he began his political career. Elected councilman in 2012 and 2016, he had been among the 5 most voted candidates in the city. During his mandate, he was president of the Commission of Persons with Disabilities and Special Needs (PPDNE). In 2012, he was elected with 7,774 votes, the third most voted, while in 2016, he was the 4th most voted with 8,312 votes.

In mid-2019, it was speculated that he would not be a candidate for council and had decided to focus exclusively on his position as a pastor with the Universal Church, which had been confirmed by a religious leader in 2020. However, amid the speculation, he became a candidate for vice-mayor for the campaign of Maguito Vilela.

=== Mayor of Goiânia (2021–present) ===
Cruz and Vilela were elected during 2020 municipal elections. Vilela, however, contracted COVID-19 and died on 13 January 2021 at Hospital Albert Einstein, where he had been hospitalized for more than 80 days due to complications from an UTI. Cruz, as a result, became mayor and effectively guarantied that the political project of Vilela would take hold and would help to develop a harmonious relationship with members of Vilela's party, including with his son Daniel Vilela and governor Ronaldo Caiado. Cruz became the first Black mayor in Goiânia's history.

As mayor of the city, Cruz led the city's response to the COVID-19 pandemic and the rise in cases at the start of 2021, including closing the city's bars for the time being. Later, in February 2021, he positioned himself against more lockdowns. However, several weeks later, he joined other mayors in the metropolitan region and closed all non-essential businesses and opted to sanction an emergency line for 6 months for families that did not have any kind of formal income, called Renda Família, accompanied by new vaccines. During the same period, he began to organize work groups to revise the Director Plan of Goiânia, one of his main campaign promises.

In March 2021, due to pressure from the party base, Cruz began administrative reforms, demoting central figures that were carried over from the Vilela administration, such as the Secretary of Government Andrey Azeredo, who was replaced by Arthur Bernardes de Miranda. At the time, he also began to align his administration with religious leaders who are connected to the Universal Church, as well as other Evangelical churches and politicians such as João Campos. As a consequence, by April, every politician from Vilela's party, the Brazilian Democratic Movement (MDB), called on secretaries to collectively ask for exoneration in protest to the abandonment of government plans, as well as the suspension of contracts made by former mayor Iris Rezende.

Political offices
Preceded by Junio Alves Araújo	Vice Mayor of Goiânia; 2021	Vacant
Preceded by Maguito Vilela	Mayor of Goiânia; 2021–present	Incumbent
