= Paulo Garcia (Brazilian politician) =

Brazilian neurosurgeon and politician (1959–2017)

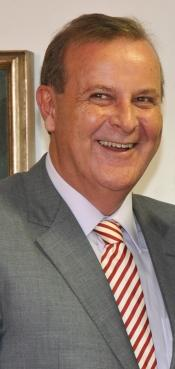
- Paulo Garcia in 2012

Mayor of Goiânia
- In office 1 April 2010 – 31 December 2016
- Preceded by: Iris Rezende
- Succeeded by: Iris Rezende

Vice Mayor of Goiânia
- In office 1 January 2009 – 1 April 2010
- Preceded by: Valdivino José de Oliveira
- Succeeded by: ?

Personal details
- Born: 13 May 1959 Goiânia, Goiás, Brazil
- Died: 30 July 2017 (aged 58) Goiânia, Goiás
- Party: Workers' Party
- Spouse: Tereza Beiler
- Education: Federal University of Goiás
- Profession: Neurosurgeon; Physician

Paulo de Siqueira Garcia (13 May 1959 – 30 July 2017) was a Brazilian neurosurgeon, physician and politician from the Workers' Party. He was the mayor of Goiânia from 1 April 2010, when then-mayor Iris Rezende resigned in order to run for governor at the 2010 election, until his death.

== Biography ==
Paulo de Siqueira Garcia was born on 13 May 1959 in Goiânia, Goiás. He was married and fathered two children. He graduated from the Federal University of Goiás' Medical School and specialized in neurosurgery.

== Political career ==
Paulo Garcia was the secretary of organization of the local Workers' Party, a substitute councilor in 2000 and a state deputy for Goiás between 2002 and 2006. As a deputy, he created the Mandate's Council, which ensured, through 17 thematic committees, people's participation in his parliamentary conduct.

=== Mayor of Goiânia ===
On 1 April 2010, Garcia became mayor of Goiânia through the resignation of then-mayor Iris Rezende, becoming the third mayor from the Workers' Party, after Darci Accorsi and Pedro Wilson. Garcia ensured that he would not change the administrative structure of the city. The parties that composed Rezende's government kept their secretaries. Gacia sought a second term at the 2012 mayoral election, in which he led all opinion polls.

== Death ==
At around 4:30 am on 30 July 2017, Garcia died from a stroke suffered in his apartment at the neighborhoods of Setor Bueno in Goiânia at the age of 58. He was survived by his wife, Tereza Beiler, a doctor, and their two children.

== See also ==
- List of mayors of Goiânia
