= Legislative Assembly of Goiás =

Legislative Assembly of Goiás Assembleia Legislativa de Goiás
- 20th legislatue

Type
- Type: Unicameral

Leadership
- President: Bruno Peixoto, UNIÃO since 1 February 2011
- 1st VP: Issy Quinan Junior, MDB
- Government Leader: Talles Barreto, UNIÃO

Structure
- Seats: 41 deputies
- Political groups: UNIÃO (8) MDB (6) Solidarity (5) Avante (3) PL (3) PP (3) PT (3) PSD (2) PSDB (2) Republicans (2) Agir (1) PDT (1) Podemos (1) PSB (1)

Elections
- Voting system: Proportional representation
- Last election: 2 October 2022
- Next election: 2026

Website
- portal.al.go.leg.br

Footnotes

The Legislative Assembly of Goiás (Portuguese: Assembleia Legislativa de Goiás) is the unicameral legislature of the Brazilian state of Goiás. The assembly, which is seated in the state capital of Goiânia, is composed of 41 state deputies elected by proportional representation.
