= 2018 Goiás gubernatorial election =

Election in Goiás, Brazil

Goiás gubernatorial election, 2018 First launched candidates
- 7 October 2018 (first round); 28 October 2018 (second round, if needed)
- Opinion polls

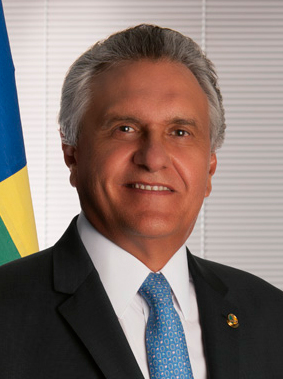

Candidate	Daniel Vilela	Alda Lúcia Souza
Party	MDB	PCO
Running mate	Heuler Cruvinel	José Geraldo da Silva
Candidate	José Eliton		Weslei Garcia
Party	PSDB		PSOL
Running mate	Raquel Teixeira		Nildinha
Candidate	Ronaldo Caiado	Kátia Maria	Marcelo Lira
Party	DEM	PT	PRTB
Running mate	Lincoln Tejota	Nivaldo Santos	Bruna Venceslau
Incumbent Governor
José Eliton
PSDB

2018 Goiás Senate election
- 7 October 2018 (one-only round)
- Opinion polls
Incumbent Senator
Lúcia Vânia Abrão Costa and Wilder Morais
PSB and PP

The 2018 Goiás gubernatorial election was held in October 2018 and elected the Governor and Vice Governor of Goiás and 41 State Deputies.

Governor Marconi Perillo was re-elected in the 2014 Brazilian general elections but resigned to run for the Federal Senate and is barred from running for his fifth non-consecutive term because of Brazilian electoral law and the Constitution, as he was re-elected in the previous election, and Lieutenant Governor José Eliton took over the State Government by the end of the year.

== Gubernatorial candidates ==
=== Confirmed candidates ===
#	Governor	Vice-Governor	Party/coalition
13	Kátia Maria (PT)	Nivaldo Santos (PCdoB)	
15	Daniel Vilela (MDB)	Heuler Cruvinel (PP)	
25	Ronaldo Caiado (DEM)	Lincoln Tejota (PROS)	
28	Marcelo Lira (PRTB)	Bruna Venceslau (PRTB)	
29	Alda Lúcia Souza (PCO)	José Geraldo da Silva (PCO)	
45	José Eliton (PSDB)	Raquel Teixeira (PSDB)	
50	Weslei Garcia (PSOL)	Nildinha (PSOL)	

== Senate candidates ==
=== Confirmed candidates ===
In alphabetic order.

- Alessandro Aquino (PCO)
- Agenor Mariano (MDB)
- Fabrício Rosa (PSOL)
- Geli Sanches (PT)
- Jorge Kajuru (PRP)
- Lúcia Vânia Abrão Costa (PSB)
- Luís César Bueno (PT)
- Magda Borges (PCB)
- Marconi Perillo (PSDB)
- Santana Pires (PAT)
- Vanderlan Cardoso (PP)
- Wilder Morais (DEM)
