= International reactions to the 2026 United States intervention in Venezuela =

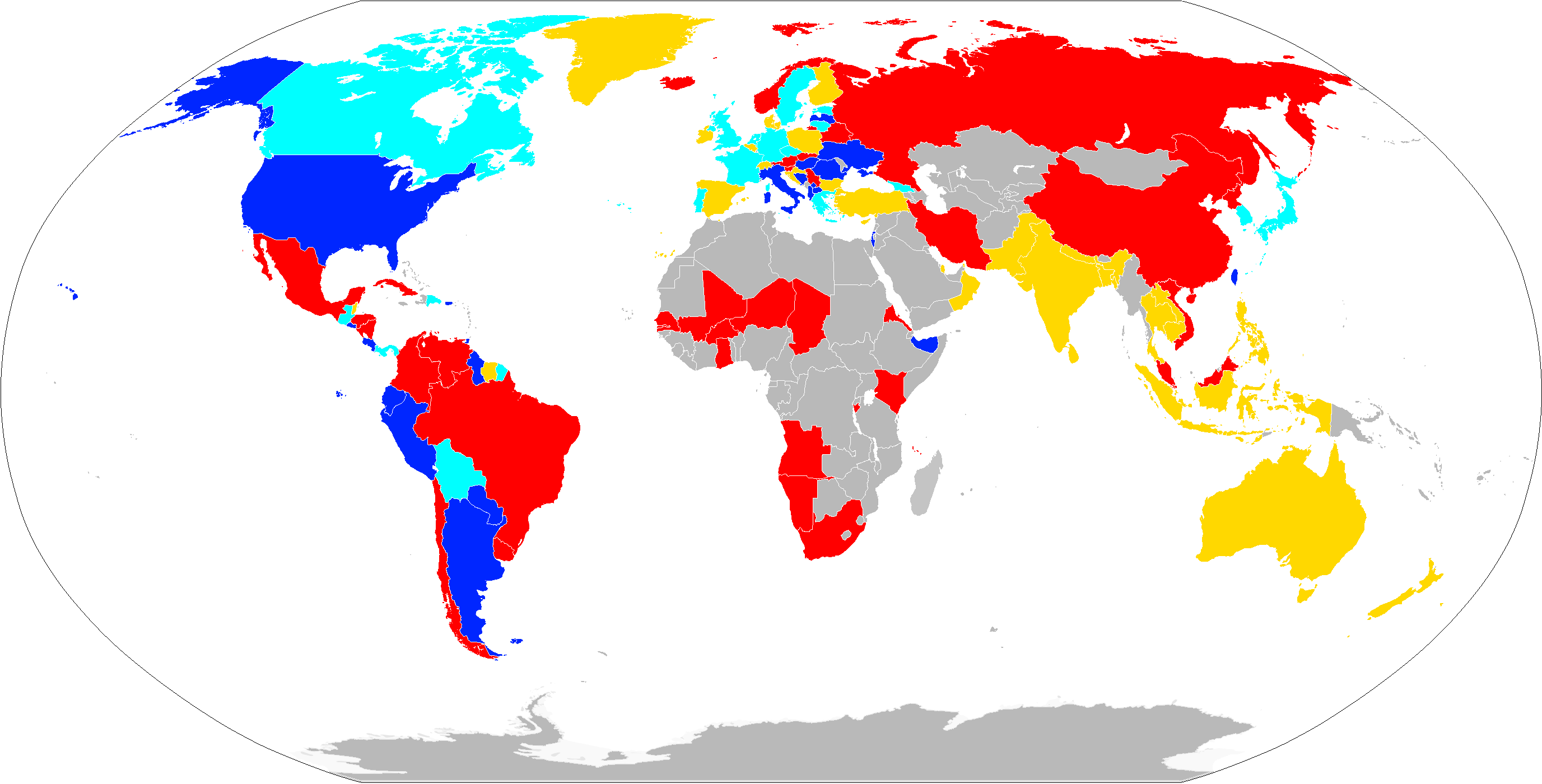
Reactions to the intervention: Countries that supported the U.S. operation Countries that called for a democratic transition in Venezuela Countries that called for respect for international law Countries that condemned the intervention

On 3 January 2026, the United States launched a military intervention in Venezuela and captured Venezuelan president Nicolás Maduro and his wife, Cilia Flores, leading to reactions from across the world. Several governments condemned the intervention, with some describing them as a violation of international law, while others expressed support, vague apprehension or were noncommittal. Most condemnations for the strikes came from countries in Africa, Asia, and most of Latin America, whereas most countries in Europe and North America, particularly NATO member states, supported the airstrikes on Venezuela and capture of Maduro.

== Countries ==
=== Africa ===
- Angola: Minister of External Relations Tete António condemned what they called "foreign intervention", and reaffirmed that Charter of the United Nations should be respected.
- Botswana: At the World Governments Summit in February 2026, President Duma Boko expressed concern over what he described as a "shocking" growing disregard for the international order, citing the United States' capture of Nicolás Maduro.
- Burkina Faso: Minister of Foreign Affairs Karamoko Jean-Marie Traoré condemned the strikes as a breach of international law and peace.
- Burundi: The Ministry of Foreign Affairs and Development Cooperation Edouard Bizimana, stated that "use of force as a means of domination" should not be allowed.
- Chad: Minister of Foreign Affairs Abdoulaye Sabre Fadoul stated that the Charter of the United Nations should be respected.
- Comoros: Minister of Foreign Affairs Mohamed Mbaé Chanfiou stated that the strikes constituted as "unacceptable bombings and [...] kidnapping".
- Egypt: The Ministry of Foreign Affairs released a statement saying that they were carefully monitoring the situation and that they would work to protect Egyptian nationals living in Venezuela. Assistant Foreign Minister Haddad El-Gohary advised the Egyptian community in the country to follow all laws and contact the embassy if they were at risk.
- Eritrea: While speaking on behalf of a UN sub-group, the nation condemned what it saw as an "act of aggression" by the United States against another nation, further calling the capture of Maduro and his wife "illegal".
- Gambia: Diplomat Serign Modou Njie called on international law to be respected "without exceptions".
- Ghana: Foreign Minister Samuel Okudzeto Ablakwa spoke against America's actions, stating the strikes were colonial and imperialist in nature, stating they had "no place" in the current world order.
- Kenya: The nation did not release their own statement, instead opting to back the African Union's statement of concern of the action, stressing the territorial integrity and self-determination of Venezuelans.
- Liberia: Minister of Foreign Affairs Sara Beysolow Nyanti stated that action should be taken at the United Nations Security Council to further discuss the strikes.
- Mali: Minister of Foreign Affairs Abdoulaye Diop condemned the strikes, specifically naming those on military and civilian targets.
- Namibia: The Ministry of International Relations and Trade stated that the strikes had violated Venezuela's sovereignty and international law, further calling for a meeting of the United Nations Security Council to sort out the matter. The decision by Namibia, a nation which traditionality voiced anti-imperialism, to not explicitly condemn the strikes was pointed out as a change in their traditional rhetoric by Deutsche Welle.
- Niger: Minister of Forign Affairs Yaou Sangaré Bakary stated the situation constituted a threat to peace and stability on the South American continent.
- Senegal: Foreign Minister Cheikh Niang held a phone call with Venezuelan Foreign Minister Yván Gil, expressing solidarity to the Venezuelan people and Senegal's commitment to international law, supporting the principle of non-intervention, and the right of Venezuelans to determine their own future.
- Somaliland: (Note: Not a UN member state. See International recognition of Somaliland.) The Ministry of Foreign Affairs announced its support for the operation and stated that Somaliland believes that it can lead to a "peaceful, Venezuelan-led political transition".
- South Africa: The Department of International Relations released a press statement which viewed the US' actions "as a manifest violation of the Charter of the United Nations". The Charter "does not authorise external military intervention in matters that are essentially within the domestic jurisdiction of a sovereign nation", and South Africa pointed to history to demonstrate how "military invasions against sovereign states yield only instability and deepening crisis". It, furthermore, called on the United Nations Security Council (UNSC) to urgently convene to address the situation.
- Uganda: President Yoweri Museveni did not explicitly support or condemn the strikes, instead commenting on the military strategy during a youth forum on 4 January, stating he didn't know what they were fighting for but that he was "still studying it".

=== Asia ===
- Bangladesh: The Ministry of Foreign Affairs issued a statement expressing concern over the "recent developments in Venezuela", and that "diplomacy and dialogue should prevail to solve all disputes between countries and reaffirms steadfast commitment to the fundamental principles of the UN Charter and international law."
- China: The Ministry of Foreign Affairs said that it was "deeply shocked and strongly condemns the U.S. for recklessly using force against a sovereign state and targeting its president" and that the attack "seriously violate[d] international law, violate[d] Venezuela's sovereignty, and threaten[ed] the peace and security of Latin America and the Caribbean". The ministry urged on the U.S. to release Maduro and his wife and ensure their personal safety. The statement was made despite US president Donald Trump telling Fox News a few hours prior to the strikes that China would not take issue with the operation due to his good relationship with Chinese leader Xi Jinping.

The Chinese Embassy in Venezuela advised Chinese citizens to avoid travel to Venezuela due to the security situation.
Foreign minister Wang Yi stated that "We never believe that any country can play the role of world policeman, nor do we agree that any country can claim itself to be an international judge." He also stated that China opposes the use or threat of force.

- India: The Ministry of External Affairs asked Indian nationals to avoid non-essential travel to Venezuela after US action and asked that nationals already in Venezuela remain in contacts with the Indian embassy in Caracas. It urged those involved to resolve conflicts amicably through communication in order to maintain regional peace and stability.
- Indonesia: Yvonne Mewengkang, spokesperson for the Ministry of Foreign Affairs, called for "de-escalation and dialogue" while protecting citizens, emphasizing "the importance of respecting international law and the principles of the UN Charter." It was monitoring the situation for the safety of Indonesian nationals. It later issued a formal statement on 4 January 2026, calling on all relevant parties to promote a peaceful settlement through de-escalation measures and dialogue, while continuing to prioritize the protection of civilians and respecting political affairs, ways-of-life, and Venezuela's sovereignty. The ministry also asked Indonesian nationals in Venezuela, especially Caracas, to keep calm and remain in contact with the Indonesian Embassy in Caracas. On 5 January 2026, the First Commission of the House of Representatives formally requested the foreign ministry to prepare emergency evacuation procedures if the situation worsens.
- Iran: The Ministry of Foreign Affairs issued a statement strongly condemning the US attack on Venezuela, calling on the United Nations and other states to respond to what it described as a blatant violation of the country's national sovereignty and territorial integrity.
- Israel: Gideon Sa'ar, the Minister of Foreign Affairs, stated via X that "Israel commends the United States' operation, led by President Trump, which acted as the leader of the free world. At this historic moment, Israel stands alongside the freedom-loving Venezuelan people, who have suffered under Maduro's illegal tyranny. Israel welcomes the removal of the dictator who led a network of drugs and terror and hopes for the return of democracy to the country and for friendly relations between the states. The people of Venezuela deserve to exercise their democratic rights. South America deserves a future free from the axis of terror and drugs." Prime Minister Benjamin Netanyahu stated that Israel supported the U.S. "strong action" in Venezuela.
- Japan: Prime Minister Sanae Takaichi tweeted that the "Japanese government is responding to this situation in close cooperation with relevant countries", stating that she is prioritizing the safety of Japanese nationals in Venezuela and "will also advance diplomatic efforts towards the restoration of democracy and stabilization of the situation in Venezuela". The Ministry of Foreign Affairs responded to the US strikes and intervention by reiterating its position as a G7 country, and offering support "toward the restoration of democracy and the stabilisation of the situation in Venezuela".
- North Korea: A Ministry of Foreign Affairs spokesperson responded to a query about the U.S. "wildly violating the sovereignty of Venezuela" by calling it a "high-handedness act", stating "The incident is another example that clearly confirms once again the rogue and brutal nature of the U.S., which the international community has so frequently witnessed for a long time". It added that North Korea "strongly denounces the U.S. hegemony-seeking act committed in Venezuela as the most serious form of encroachment of sovereignty and as a wanton violation of the U.N. Charter and international laws". It also called on the international community to recognize the "catastrophic" situation in Venezuela and denounce the U.S.'s "habituated violation of sovereignty of other countries".
- South Korea: On 3 January, President Lee Jae Myung instructed officials to ensure the protection of South Korean nationals in Venezuela and to prepare evacuation plans in case the situation worsens. The Ministry of Foreign Affairs set up a task force to protect its nationals. On 4 January, The Ministry of Foreign Affairs spokesperson urged "all parties to make every effort to ease tensions in the region" and hoped "that democracy will be restored with the will of the Venezuelan people respected and that the situation in Venezuela will be stabilised at an early date through dialogue".
- Malaysia: The Ministry of Foreign Affairs reaffirmed its position of "opposing all forms of foreign intervention in the internal affairs of sovereign states, as well as the threat or use of force". The Foreign Ministry also confirmed that no Malaysians in the country were affected by the strikes, stating that the situation is closely monitored and actively obtaining updates to ensure safety of Malaysians. Prime Minister Anwar Ibrahim described the operation on Facebook as "unusual in scope and nature" as well as constitutes a "clear violation of international law and amounts to an unlawful use of force against a sovereign state".
- Oman: The Ministry of Foreign Affairs stated that it respects state sovereignty and independence and fully supports international law. In order to avoid escalation and bring about reconciliation, it urged all sides to use moderation and promote communication.
- Pakistan: The Ministry of Foreign Affairs stated that it attaches "great importance" to the wellbeing of the Venezuelan people, and urges the need for restraint and de-escalation in line with the principles of the Charter of the United Nations. It added that it is engaged with the situation on the ground to ensure the safety and security of Pakistanis in Venezuela.
- Philippines: The Department of Foreign Affairs stated that it is monitoring the situation in Venezuela and urged "concerned parties to resolve disputes through peaceful means, and to exercise restraint to prevent escalation of conflict". It said the Philippine Embassy in Bogotá, the non-resident mission for Venezuela, had "issued a travel and safety advisory to Filipinos in Venezuela" and was prepared to provide assistance.
- Qatar: The Ministry of Foreign Affairs of Qatar called for restraint and de-escalation and emphasized support for international law and the UN charter. It also offered to contribute to mediation efforts to reach an "immediate peaceful solution".
- Singapore: The Ministry of Foreign Affairs of Singapore expressed "grave concern" about the intervention and urged restraint by all parties. Senior Minister Lee Hsien Loong stated that the US strikes in Venezuela, would have worrying long-term consequences to the international system and small countries in particular.
- Taiwan: (Note: Not a UN member state. See International recognition of Taiwan.) The Ministry of Foreign Affairs stated that it is closely monitoring the developments in Venezuela, and would continue to cooperate with democratic allies and work together for regional and global security, stability, and prosperity.
- Thailand: The Ministry of Foreign Affairs stated that it is closely monitoring the situation and urges all parties involved to resolve the conflict peacefully in accordance with the UN Charter and international law, exercising restraint to avoid further escalation, prioritizing civilian protection and respecting Venezuelans' will.
- Vietnam: The Ministry of Foreign Affairs expressed deep concern about the Venezuelan situation. The Vietnamese authority also called all sides to respect international law and the United Nations Charter, including the principle of respect for national sovereignty, and to refrain from the use or threat of force in international relations.

=== Europe ===
- Albania: Foreign Minister Elisa Spiropali expressed Albania's full support for the US. Among other things, she said: "As a steadfast U.S. ally and NATO member, Albania stands shoulder to shoulder with American leadership in the defense of democratic principles and global security."
- Andorra: Foreign Minister Imma Tor emphasised the Andorran government's opposition to "Maduro's oppressive regime" and "we trust that the political transition process will continue peacefully and in accordance with international law".
- Belarus: President Alexander Lukashenko "categorically condemned" the strikes and the Belarusian Ministry of Foreign Affairs said the US' "armed aggression" was a "direct threat" to international peace and security.
- Bosnia and Herzegovina: The Ministry of Foreign Affairs expressed Bosnia and Herzegovina's support for the "people of Venezuela and for stability in the country and the wider region", calling on "all actors to act rationally, responsibly and with restraint to prevent further escalation and suffering". The Ministry added that "Maduro is a dictator, the world would be a better place without a ruler like him."
- Czech Republic: Prime Minister Andrej Babiš stated that he hopes that "the citizens of Venezuela will have freedom and democracy, and that they will choose a democratic regime". Foreign Minister Petr Macinka stated the importance of calming the situation in Venezuela and to conduct diplomatic negotiations, including with the local opposition.
- Denmark: The Minister for Foreign Affairs said: "I expect the UN Security Council to meet quickly to discuss the situation – we need to get back on track towards de-escalation and dialogue," adding "we must maintain respect for the international rules of the game".
- France: President Emmanuel Macron called for Maduro's 2024 opposition candidate, Edmundo González, whom he refers to as "president", to oversee a "peaceful, democratic" transition. Macron praised the removal of the "Maduro dictatorship," stating that the Venezuelan people "can only rejoice" at being rid of his rule. Foreign Minister Jean-Noël Barrot criticized the U.S. military action that deposed Maduro, arguing that it contravened international law. He stated that the use of force violated the principle of non-resort to force and emphasized that France does not believe a durable political solution can be imposed from outside the country, reaffirming that a nation's future must be decided by its own people.
- Georgia: The Ministry of Foreign Affairs stated that it was "closely following" the situation in Venezuela "with the hope that future processes will unfold in line with the best interests of the Venezuelan people", and expressed its hopes that Venezuela would revoke its recognition of Abkhazia and South Ossetia.
- Germany: Chancellor Friedrich Merz stated that "Nicolás Maduro has led his country into ruin. The most recent election was rigged. Like many other countries, we have therefore not recognized his presidency. Maduro has played a problematic role in the region. The legal assessment of the U.S. intervention is complex and requires careful consideration. International law remains the guiding framework. At this stage, political instability in Venezuela must be avoided. The objective is an orderly transition to an elected government."
- Holy See: Pope Leo XIV expressed concern over the US attack on Venezuela and the arrest of Maduro. He stated "The good of the beloved Venezuelan people must prevail over every other consideration and lead us to overcome violence and to undertake paths of justice and peace ..." at the midday Angelus prayer. Pope Leo invited everyone to pray for the people of Venezuela in St. Peter's Square.
- Hungary: Prime Minister Viktor Orbán welcomed the capture of Maduro as "good news" for Hungary, stating that it will bring down oil prices, and brushed aside legality concerns. He also stated that no Hungarian citizen was harmed in Venezuela, and that the Hungarian government was working to protect Hungarians in the region. He stated the government was working with the energy sector to prevent price increases stemming from the crisis.
- Iceland: Foreign Minister Þorgerður Katrín Gunnarsdóttir condemned the strikes, stating that "we can and must stand against authoritarianism and human rights abuses at the same time".
- Ireland: Minister for Foreign Affairs and Trade Helen McEntee said in a statement that she was in close contact with EU High Representative Kaja Kallas, and Ireland underlines the absolute necessity of full respect for international law and the principles of the UN Charter.
- Italy: Prime Minister Giorgia Meloni defended the U.S. military operation as "legitimate" and "defensive intervention." She reaffirmed the government's support for a democratic transition in Venezuela, condemned repression by the Maduro government, whose electoral victory it does not recognize, and stated that while Italy opposes external military intervention, it considers defensive action against hybrid threats to national security, including those linked to state actors involved in narcotrafficking, to be legitimate.
- Kosovo: (Note: Not a UN member state. See International recognition of Kosovo.) President Vjosa Osmani expressed her support for the US, stating that "Kosovo understands the impact of American resolve – our liberation is a testament to that. At a time when the US is confronting tyranny in Venezuela, we must all reinforce this stance, because the transatlantic community is strongest when united behind American leadership and shared values. When America leads, we stand proudly together – because our collective freedom depends on it." Prime Minister Albin Kurti also expressed his full support for the US, arguing that the strikes were in defense of Western democratic values.
- Liechtenstein: The government of Liechtenstein called for adherence to international law.
- Malta: The Maltese government, which had not recognised Maduro's legitimacy, called for de-escalation and respect for international law.
- North Macedonia: Foreign Minister Timčo Mucunski welcomed President Donald Trump's announcement that Nicolás Maduro had been arrested and would face justice.
- Netherlands: Prime Minister Dick Schoof stated that the Dutch cabinet was "closely following the developments in the Caribbean region and the situation in Venezuela following the US attacks," saying that "safety in the region is of great importance to Aruba, Curaçao and Bonaire." Foreign Affairs Minister David van Weel stated that "The Kingdom of the Netherlands does not recognise the Maduro regime and calls for a swift return to democracy. The Netherlands urges all parties to prevent further escalation and to adhere to international law."
- Norway: Minister of Foreign Affairs Espen Barth Eide stated that even though Norway does not recognize the legitimacy of Maduro's presidency, the American military operation marked "a grave escalation of an already highly volatile situation" and that it was "not in accordance with international law."
- Poland: Prime Minister Donald Tusk stated that the "U.S. strike on Venezuela affects the entire world," and that he hoped that 2026 would not be more eventful than 2025.
- Portugal: Prime Minister Luís Montenegro stated that the Portuguese government is "focused on the future and on the restoration of a full democracy in which Venezuelans can freely choose their future." and that the government is "taking note of President Trump and the role of the United States in promoting a stable, peaceful, democratic, and inclusive transition in Venezuela as swiftly as possible. Minister of Foreign Affairs Paulo Rangel confirmed that the Portuguese government is continuously monitoring the situation in Venezuela, in coordination with the President of the Republic, through the Portuguese embassy in Caracas, the consular network and contacts with European partners, the European Union and countries in the region. The Portuguese government has declared the safety of Portuguese nationals in Venezuela to be a priority.
- Romania: Prime Minister Ilie Bolojan stated that "Without being an international law specialist, obviously following the relations between the United States and Venezuela, they have been conflictual relations for many years, with the United States accusing the dictatorial leaderships of Venezuela in recent years of drug trafficking, of encouraging crime, of illegal migration and the United States Navy has been in the Venezuelan coastal area and is hitting boats that are suspected of drug trafficking. From this point of view, it was certainly a special operation that is not usual, but I hope the people of Venezuela will be in a situation where they will manage to establish a stable leadership and return to a democratic system."
- Russia: The Ministry of Foreign Affairs condemned the strikes, calling them an "act of armed aggression".
- Serbia: President Aleksandar Vučić stated that "we want friendly relations with the United States, [...] but that it is our job to point out that there was a breach on international law".
- Slovakia: Prime Minister Robert Fico criticized the actions of the United States, stating that "International law does not apply, military power is used without the mandate of the UN Security Council, and everyone who is great and strong does what he wants to promote their own interests," and that "I resolutely reject such a disruption of international law, as I did in the Iraq war, in the denial of Kosovo as a sovereign state, or in the use of Russian military power in Ukraine." He also suggested that the European Union should apply the same standards that were used with Russia when it invaded Ukraine, saying that "Either the use of American military force in Venezuela will be condemned and be consistent with attitudes to the war in Ukraine, or, as usual, remain pharisaical."
- Spain: The Foreign Ministry called for "de-escalation and moderation", and for compliance with "international law and the principles of the UN charter" adding that the ministry was "prepared to offer its good offices to achieve a peaceful and negotiated solution". They reiterated that they did not recognize the results of the 2024 Venezuelan presidential election and that Spain "has welcomed, and will continue to welcome, tens of thousands of Venezuelans who have had to leave their country for political reasons." On 4 January 2026, Brazil, Spain, Chile, Colombia, Mexico, and Uruguay issued a joint statement to express their "profound concern and firm rejection of the military actions carried out unilaterally in Venezuelan territory" by the United States. Prime Minister Pedro Sánchez also said that they would not recognize a US intervention that violates international law after President Trump announced that the US would run Venezuela.
- Sweden: Prime Minister Ulf Kristersson stated that "Venezuela has been one of the world's most ruthless socialist dictatorships," adding that "the Venezuelan people have been freed from Maduro's dictatorship," whilst reiterating that "all states have a responsibility to respect and act in accordance with international law". Foreign Minister Maria Malmer Stenergard stated that "dictator Nicolás Maduro lacked democratic legitimacy. The Swedish government sheds no tears over the fact that he has lost power," but that "Venezuela's future must be decided by the Venezuelan people. Respecting the will of the Venezuelan people and achieving a negotiated, democratic, and peaceful solution is the only way for Venezuela to restore democracy and resolve the ongoing crisis."
- Switzerland: The Federal Department of Foreign Affairs stated that "Switzerland has called for de-escalation, restraint and respect for international law." The Swiss government later ordered to freeze potential assests by Maduro in the country.
- Turkey: Turkey said it was monitoring the situation in Venezuela, and urged restraint and called on all parties maintain order for the sake of regional and international security and safety.
- Ukraine: Foreign Minister Andrii Sybiha stated that "Ukraine has consistently defended the right of nations to live freely, free of dictatorship, oppression, and human rights violations. The Maduro regime has violated all such principles in every respect. We stand for further developments in accordance with the principles of international law, prioritising democracy, human rights, and the interests of Venezuelans." Ukrainian President Volodymyr Zelenskyy reacted with a pointed remark to the United States' capture of Nicolás Maduro, suggesting the U.S. now "knows what to do next" when dealing with dictators.
- United Kingdom: Prime Minister Keir Starmer stated "The UK has long supported a transition of power in Venezuela. We regarded Maduro as an illegitimate President and we shed no tears about the end of his regime", adding "I always say and believe we should all uphold international law." He also clarified that the United Kingdom was not involved in the strikes. The Foreign Office advised against all travel to Venezuela for British citizens.
- South Ossetia: South Ossetia condemned the US attacks.

=== North America ===
- Aruba (constituent country of the Netherlands): Flights to the United States were cancelled as a precautionary measure. Prime Minister Mike Eman stated that despite the island's geographic proximity to Venezuela, Aruba was "well prepared" and that there was no cause for concern for daily life to Arubans.
- The Bahamas: The Ministry of Foreign Affairs supported the Caribbean Community's position on the intervention and stressed that all parties should act in accordance with international law. The government also advised Bahamians not to travel to Venezuela because of the security situation.
- Canada: Minister of Foreign Affairs Anita Anand said that Canada refused to recognise the "illegitimate regime" of Maduro and opposed its "repression" of the Venezuelan people. She also stated that Canada calls on all parties to respect international law.
- Cuba: President and First Secretary of the Communist Party Miguel Díaz-Canel denounced "the criminal attack by the US" on Venezuela, and he called for urgent condemnation from the international community for what he described as "state terrorism against the brave Venezuelan people and against Our America".
- El Salvador: President Nayib Bukele posted a photo of a captured Maduro.
- Greenland (territory of Denmark): Prime Minister Jens-Frederik Nielsen firmly stated that it would be "not respectful" to compare the democratic institutions in Greenland to those in Venezuela, stating that the reasons for another "overnight takeover" were not the same, and called on more direct communication to be had with the United States amid the proposed US acquisition of the territory.
- Honduras: Outgoing President Xiomara Castro strongly condemned what she described as an act of kidnapping by the United States, calling the events "an affront to the sovereignty and independence of the peoples of Latin America and the Caribbean." President Castro declared that Honduras stands "in solidarity with the brave people of Venezuela, and with President Nicolás Maduro and his wife".
- Jamaica: As a member of the Bureau of the Conference of Heads of Government of the Caribbean Community, Jamaica joined a statement issued following the U.S. military action that reaffirmed the principles of international law, state sovereignty and territorial integrity, and called for peaceful dialogue through diplomatic channels.
- Mexico: President Claudia Sheinbaum "strongly condemns and rejects" the US military action, stating that the strikes breached the United Nations Charter. She urged the US to comply with international law and end "all acts of aggression" against the Venezuelan government and people.
- Nicaragua: The Nicaraguan government condemned the strikes, claiming that peace in Venezuela was "gravely hurt" and called for Maduro's release. On 3 January, a statement from Foreign Minister Valdrack Jaentschke condemned the US intervention and conveyed support for Delcy Rodríguez.
- Panama: President José Raúl Mulino voiced support for Venezuela's legitimate electoral outcome of the 2024 Venezuelan presidential election and the election of Edmundo González, affirming that Panama backs peace and an orderly and legitimate transition process.
- Trinidad and Tobago: Prime Minister Kamla Persad-Bissessar said Trinidad and Tobago played no role in any United States military operations in Venezuela. In December 2025, the government of Trinidad and Tobago had announced it would allow the US military access to its airports in the coming weeks following the recent installation of a radar system.

=== Oceania ===
- Australia: Prime Minister Anthony Albanese urged all parties to "support dialogue and diplomacy".
- New Zealand: Foreign Minister Winston Peters expressed that "New Zealand is concerned by and actively monitoring developments in Venezuela and expects all parties to act in accordance with international law."

=== South America ===
- Argentina: President Javier Milei celebrated the capture of Maduro and his wife by posting on social media: "liberty advances, ¡Viva la libertad, carajo!". In an interview with local media, Milei said that Maduro "clung on to power" and ran a regime "rigging elections", reaffirming that his capture was "excellent news for the free world". On 7 January, Milei expressed support for the US taking control of the Venezuelan oil industry, arguing that it will "cut (the) supply of communists."
- Bolivia: The Ministry of Foreign Affairs expressed support for the Venezuelan people in their path to recover "democracy, constitutional order, and human rights", while reaffirming Bolivia's commitment to Venezuela's stability and humanitarian assistance. President Rodrigo Paz later stated that "freedom is not negotiable" and that "the way out for Venezuela is to respect the vote". On January 4 Bolivia imposed travel restrictions to members of the security forces of Venezuela as well as Venezuelan officials and former officials of the Maduro government.
- Brazil: President Luiz Inácio Lula da Silva condemned the strikes and the capture of Maduro, referring to them as a "very serious affront to the sovereignty of Venezuela and a extremely dangerous precedent to all the international community". On 4 January 2026, Brazil, Spain, Chile, Colombia, Mexico, and Uruguay issued a joint statement to express their "profound concern and firm rejection of the military actions carried out unilaterally in Venezuelan territory" by the United States.
- Chile: Outgoing president Gabriel Boric condemned the strikes, calling for a peaceful resolution to the crisis and reaffirming Chile's commitment to international law and multilateralism rather than violence and foreign interference. President-elect José Antonio Kast said that the capture of Maduro was "great news for the region".
- Colombia: President Gustavo Petro called for a meeting of the United Nations Security Council and rejected "the aggression against the sovereignty of Venezuela and of Latin America". It was also reported that Colombia had moved troops to the Colombia-Venezuela border to head off clashes and potential inflow of refugees from Venezuela. On 8 January, thousands of Colombians protested against the intervention and the capture of Maduro, including the city of Cúcuta, near the Venezuelan border. Petro also condemned the death of Yohana Rodríguez, a Colombian citizen and one of the two civilian casualties, issuing harsh words to President Trump and those in Colombia celebrating the attacks.
- Ecuador: President Daniel Noboa said: "To all the narco Chavista criminals, your time is coming. Your structure will completely collapse across the entire continent."
- Guyana: President Irfaan Ali stated that Guyana has activated its security plan, declaring that "the Guyana Defence Force and the security forces are monitoring the situation and Guyanese should be reassured that the government is working to ensure the safety and security of our citizens."
- Paraguay: The Ministry of Foreign Affairs issued a statement reaffirming the country's "historic commitment to the peaceful resolution of international disputes". It also referred to Maduro as the "leader" of the Cartel of the Suns (declared a terrorist organization by the Paraguayan government) and stated that his continued hold on power posed a threat to the region. President Santiago Peña later approved the strikes, stating that "it can only bring good news".
- Peru: President José Jerí welcomed the intervention, stating that "Venezuela is beginning a new era of democracy and freedom." Similarly, he mentioned that "many families will be able to reunite in their country, so we will facilitate their immediate return regardless of their immigration status."
- Uruguay: The Ministry of Foreign Relations condemned the US intervention in Venezuela, calling on the US to adhere to the UN Charter and respect Venezuela's sovereignty.

== International organizations ==
- United Nations: Stéphane Dujarric, the spokesperson for Secretary-General António Guterres, said that Guterres was "deeply alarmed by the recent escalation in Venezuela", and that it constituted a "dangerous precedent", emphasizing the full respect "by all – of international law, including the UN Charter". The UN High Commissioner for Human Rights, Volker Türk, requested restraint while respecting international law. Türk stated that "the protection of the people of Venezuela is paramount and must guide any further action". The UN Independent International Fact-Finding Mission on the Bolivarian Republic of Venezuela raised concerns over Venezuela's human rights situation and urged that accountability cannot be ignored by the developing situation. The Human Rights Council-appointed chair for the mission, Marta Valiñas, echoed Türk's concerns of "grave human rights violations and crimes against humanity" in spite of the US' justification for its actions. At the request of Venezuela and Colombia, with the support of permanent members Russia and China, the UN Security Council convened on 5 January to discuss the situation. Representatives of Russia and China called for the immediate release of President Maduro while the US representative rejected characterisations of US actions as military aggression, describing the operation as a targeted law enforcement measure to arrest an indicted fugitive.
- European Union: High Representative of the Union for Foreign Affairs and Security Policy Kaja Kallas called for restraint and de-escalation, saying international law and the UN Charter must be upheld, while reiterating the EU's position that Maduro's government "lacks legitimacy".
- African Union: The union stated their "grave concerns" about the capture of Maduro, but avoided naming Trump explicitly in their statement. They further stated that the territorial integrity and self-determination of Venezuelans should be respected.
- Non-Aligned Movement: Uganda, speaking on behalf of the organization before the UN Security Council on 5 January, denounced the operation: stating America had undermined peace efforts and committed an "act of war" against Venezuela in its actions.
- Organization of American States: Secretary General Albert Ramdin called on all actors to fully respect international law, offered to assist in de-escalation, and announced that the organization's Permanent Council would convene to discuss the recent developments.

== Political parties ==
=== Argentina ===
- The president of the Justicialist Party (and former Argentine president), Cristina Fernández de Kirchner, criticized the strikes, labelling Maduro's capture as "kidnapping" and stated that Trump "crossed the line again".

=== Australia ===
- The conservative Liberal–National Coalition issued a statement welcoming the news, with leader Sussan Ley remarking that "We should live in a world where dictators and despots face justice for their crimes."
- The Greens defense spokesman David Shoebridge condemned the operation as a breach of international law that "continues the world on a dangerous path of lawless aggression."
- Labor Against War, a political group within the ruling Labor Party, called on the government to condemn the strikes and to "immediately distance itself from the Trump administration, whose conduct is marked by [...] lawlessness at home and violent, reckless coercion abroad".

=== Brazil ===
- The National Political Commission of the Central Committee of the Brazilian Communist Party condemned the U.S. action as an "international terrorist attack".
- The Socialism and Liberty Party condemned the U.S. action as a "criminal actions of the United States, which violate the self-determination of Venezuela and Latin America through attacks that break with the principles of the Charter of the United Nations, Human Rights, and International Law".
- The Workers' Party condemned the U.S. action as the "kidnapping of President Nicolás Maduro and the First Lady".
- The national president of the Brazilian Social Democracy Party, Aécio Neves, stated that the party "repudiates the North American invasion against Venezuela".
- The governor of Rio de Janeiro, Cláudio Castro, celebrated the capture of Maduro. He said that the people of Venezuela had reasons to celebrate the capture. Castro said Maduro was a dictator who violated human rights, persecuted and silenced opponents. He also said Maduro does not respect democratic values, which Castro said "are so dear to us all".
- The governor of São Paulo, Tarcísio de Freitas said the US military operation in Venezuela represented a window of hope. He said: "A dictatorship doesn't fall overnight. It corrodes institutions from within, little by little, and the population always pays the highest price. May the arrest of dictator Maduro be the first step on the path to freedom for Venezuela".
- The governor of Minas Gerais, Romeu Zema, said he hoped that Maduro's downfall would allow Venezuela to "rediscover peace, stability and the path to development".
- The governor of Goiás, Ronaldo Caiado, said that "this 3 January goes down in history as the day of the liberation of the Venezuelan people, who have lived for more than 20 years under a"Chavista narco-dictatorship".
- Senator Flávio Bolsonaro (PL-RJ) publicly celebrated the capture of Maduro by the United States, describing the event as a historic milestone for freedom and democracy. He said that Venezuela had become one of the most extreme examples of "how an authoritarian regime can destroy a nation".
- Michelle Bolsonaro, former First Lady of Brazil and the president of the women's movement under the Liberal Party, PL Mulher, stated that the U.S. action represents the "beginning of the end of the authoritarian and criminal regime" of Venezuela and a message for "dictators disguised as democrats and defenders of drug traffickers".

=== Canada ===
- The Liberal Party welcomed the potential for freedom and democracy in Venezuela while emphasizing respect for international law.
- The Conservative Party celebrated the U.S. capture of Maduro as a victory against socialism and called for Maduro to face imprisonment.
- The NDP condemned the U.S. military action as illegal, unauthorized by the UN, and called on Canada to demand its immediate cessation.
- The Bloc Québécois noted that Maduro's regime violates fundamental freedoms but warned that U.S. military intervention risks civilian lives and disregards international law.
- The Green Party condemned the kidnapping of Maduro as a violation of international law which made the world less safe and more unstable.

=== Chile ===
- Citing president-elect José Antonio Kast's positive views on the U.S. actions, the Communist Party of Chile decided to protest by not attending Kast's inauguration in March 2026.

=== Colombia ===
- Democratic Center celebrated the U.S.'s military actions in response to declarations from former Colombian president Juan Manuel Santos that were critical of them, with the party also comparing Colombian president Gustavo Petro to Maduro. Party member and former Colombian president Álvaro Uribe said that "United States [sic] Acted in Legitimate Self-Defense", further saying that the U.S. "has had to do what international bodies and the Venezuelan Armed Forces should have done but did not" and wishing for Colombia to "soon free itself from this destructive contagion".

=== Costa Rica ===
- The Broad Front condemned the US military action accusing the US of using "Trump's supremacist logic".

=== El Salvador ===
- The Farabundo Martí National Liberation Front condemned the US military action as "aggression against all Latin America".

=== France ===
- La France Insoumise voiced strong opposition to the American intervention, while the party's de facto leader Jean-Luc Mélenchon declared "there is no such thing as a good invasion, only bad ones. No pretext authorizes one nation to invade its neighbor, especially not under the claim of solving its problems."
- Jordan Bardella, president of the National Rally, reaffirmed his rejection of the "red regime of Maduro" and called it a "bloody and merciless dictatorship." However, Bardella simultaneously opposed US intervention, declaring that "the external overthrow of a government by force cannot constitute an acceptable response" since "it only exacerbates geopolitical instability." Bardella maintained that the solution was to "give the Venezuelan people a voice as soon as possible." Marine Le Pen, former president of the National Rally and leader of the party in the French National Assembly, made similar statements, saying that there are "a thousand reasons to condemn Nicolás Maduro's regime: communist, oligarchic, and authoritarian," but that "state sovereignty is never negotiable" and that "To renounce this principle today for Venezuela, for any state, would be to accept our own servitude tomorrow."

=== Germany ===
The Merz cabinet is a coalition of CDU/CSU and SPD. Greens, AfD and Left are the opposition in the 21st Bundestag.

- The CDU/CSU (Union) foreign policy spokesperson Jürgen Hardt described the end of Maduro's rule as a hopeful signal for Venezuela.
- The Bündnis 90/Greens co-leader Franziska Brantner called the U.S. strike a violation of international law that the German government must clearly acknowledge.
- The Left party leader accused U.S. President Trump of state terrorism.
- The AfD foreign policy spokesperson Markus Frohnmaier emphasized the principle of non-intervention while awaiting the U.S. justification for the strike.

=== Guatemala ===
- The URNG condemned the US military action and demanded the withdrawal of the US forced from the region and the release of Maduro.
- Winaq condemned the US military action saying it was not "to the defense of democracy or human rights, but to the historical interests of imperialism to appropriate the strategic resources of the people".

=== Honduras ===
- The National Party of Honduras (party of president-elect Nasry Asfura) expressed its support for the action and advocated for an "orderly, peaceful and constitutional transition" in Venezuela.

=== India ===
- The Communist Party of India and its affiliates condemned the US strikes in Venezuela.
- The Indian National Congress denounced the US's unilateral actions in Venezuela, accusing the United States for transgressing the settled principles of international law, the United Nations Charter and numerous international treaties.

=== Indonesia ===
- The Just and Prosperous People's Party of the Advanced Indonesia Coalition condemned the U.S. strikes in Venezuela and denounced it as "vulgar aggression".
- The National Awakening Party of the Advanced Indonesia Coalition, through its faction in the House of Representatives condemned the U.S. strikes and accused Donald Trump of using the "law of the jungle" which can be set by other advanced, developed powers to force developing states into capitulation, leading to "modern-era imperialism and colonization".
- The Prosperous Justice Party through its faction in the House of Representatives condemned the U.S. strikes as an illegal act against the legitimate Venezuelan government and warned that this can set a precedence for future illegal acts committed by a powerful ruling government of a state against the government of their rival states or neighboring states.

=== Italy ===
- The Ligurian faction of the Democratic Party condemned the attack, claiming "democracy cannot be exported with bombs"

=== Liechtenstein ===
- The Free List condemned the operation as a violation of international law and called for the government of Liechtenstein to also condemn it.

=== Malaysia ===
- Secretary General of the Malaysian United Indigenous Party, Azmin Ali said that the operation "amounted to a unilateral and unlawful use of armed force under international law, in violation of Article 2(4) of the Charter of the United Nations" and called for the Malaysian government to "strengthen the Global South through the Non-Aligned Movement and enhance cross-regional cooperation, while lending support to international accountability mechanisms addressing violations of international law."
- The chairman of the People's Justice Party's International Affairs Bureau, Maszlee Malik, urged the US to halt all military actions against Venezuela, respect Venezuela's sovereignty and political freedom fully aligned with the Charter of the United Nations and demanded the international community to "preserve peace and prioritize diplomatic solutions through dialogue and multilateral forums".

=== Morocco ===
- The Party of Progress and Socialism released a statement condemning the capture of Maduro, describing it as "American imperialist aggression" and reiterating the party's "full and complete solidarity with the brotherly Venezuelan people".

=== New Zealand ===
- The opposition Green Party of Aotearoa New Zealand's co-leader, Marama Davidson, stated "this is a unilateral attack that goes against any enduring pathway to international peace through justice." She called upon Prime Minister Christopher Luxon to condemn the United States for attacking Venezuela.

=== Paraguay ===
- The president of the Authentic Radical Liberal Party, Hugo Fleitas, applauded Maduro's capture, stating that "We celebrate the liberation of Venezuela from the oppressive regime of dictator Maduro" and "we hope for the restoration of democracy based on respect for the self-determination of the Venezuelan people, expressed at the polls in 2024 with the election of Edmundo González as their president."
- The Guasú Front issued a statement condemning the strikes, labelling as an "intolerable military aggression against Venezuela and all of Latin America."

=== Peru ===
- Free Peru's leader Vladimir Cerrón denounced the US military action as an "imperialist war" and declared his solidarity with Venezuela.
- Popular Force's leader Keiko Fujimori called it a "historical event" marking the end of the "criminal dictatorship".
- Popular Renewal's leader Rafael López Aliaga praised the action and congratulated María Corina Machado.

=== Philippines ===
- Akbayan condemned the what they view as an attack on Venezuela's sovereignty and on the people's right to self-determination and challenged the United States' justification of self-defense and support of democratic regime change for Venezuelan people. It says that the incident ushured a "new world order" where international disputes are resolved through "brute force" rather than international law.
- The Makabayan bloc has urged President Bongbong Marcos to issue a clear and unequivocal condemnation on what it calls an "unprovoked" attack on Venezuela. It also reiterates its opposition to the Philippines' Mutual Defense Treaty and Enhanced Defense Cooperation Agreement with the United States.

=== Spain ===
- The president of the People's Party, Alberto Núñez Feijóo, celebrated Maduro's capture, labelling as the end of the "iron-fisted narco-dictatorship" and criticized the "coward" response of Pedro Sánchez.
- The spokesperson for Vox, Jorge Buxadé, celebrated Maduro's capture, who also labelled him as a "narco-dictator" and claimed that his fall would be "dangerous" for the Sanchez government.

=== United Kingdom ===
- The Conservative Party leader Kemi Badenoch stated that removing Maduro was "the right thing to do", and that she was "glad" that he was gone.
- The leader of the Liberal Democrats, Ed Davey, stated that while Maduro is a "brutal, illegitimate dictator," it "does not give President Trump a free pass for illegal action."
- Nigel Farage, leader of Reform UK, acknowledged that the intervention was "unorthodox" but praised that "the Venezuelan people can now turn a new leaf without Maduro", and said he hoped that the American action would "make China and Russia think twice".
- Zack Polanski, leader of the Green Party of England and Wales, condemned "this illegal strike" and was critical of Starmer for not doing the same.

=== United States ===
- The Libertarian Party condemned the strikes and accused America of taking part in "extrajudicial violence that undermines the rule of law."

=== Uruguay ===
- The Broad Front condemned the operation, arguing that it constituted a "threat to peace in the region" and a violation of international law and the multilateral system. It further expressed its solidarity with the Venezuelan people, describing it as an event that "marks a turning point in the region."
- The National Executive Comitte of the Colorado Party stated that "the dictator has fallen" and Maduro's fall opens a "real democratic transition" under the leadership of both Edmundo González and María Corina Machado.
- The National Party reiterated its condemnation of what it described as the "dictatorship of Nicolás Maduro," citing the persecution of political dissent, the systematic violation of human rights, and the existence of political prisoners, while also affirming that it does not support any form of foreign military or political intervention aimed at determining Venezuela's future or undermining its sovereignty.

=== Russia ===
- The Communist Party of the Russian Federation condemned the operation.

== Non-state actors ==
- Hamas: Hamas strongly condemned the strikes on Venezuela, calling them a "grave violation of international law" and an "assault on the sovereignty of an independent state," adding that it "represents a continuation of America's unjust policies and interferences, which are driven by its imperial ambitions."
- Hezbollah: Hezbollah condemned what it called "the terrorist aggression and American thuggery against the Bolivarian Republic of Venezuela," and added that it "further affirms its full solidarity with Venezuela — its people, presidency, and government — in confronting this American aggression and arrogance." It added that "The US is gripped by a craze for control, especially under the current president, and continues its aggressive polices based on subjugating free nations and peoples, plundering their wealth and resources, and leading wars aimed at redrawing borders."
- Popular Front for the Liberation of Palestine: The Popular Front for the Liberation of Palestine condemned the attack, asserting it to be akin to Israeli aggression against Palestinians. The group affirmed that they stood with Venezuela on all fronts and that vowed that the nation ("Venezuela - 'Bolivar, Chávez, and Maduro'") would emerge victorious.
- SPC: The Houthi-led government in Yemen condemned the United States as "terrorists," stating "What America is doing to Venezuela proves once again that America is the head of evil and the mother of terrorism. Yemen affirms solidarity with Venezuela and its President Nicolás Maduro, who has refused to submit to American hegemony."

== See also ==
- Crisis in Venezuela
- Foreign relations of Venezuela
- International reactions to the 2024 Venezuelan presidential election
- Operation Southern Spear
- United States–Venezuela relations
