= Ronaldo Caiado 2026 presidential campaign =

Brazilian political campaign

- Campaign: 2026 Brazilian general election
- Candidate: Ronaldo Caiado; Governor of Goiás; (2019–2026); Gilberto Kassab; Minister of Science and Technology; (2016–2019)
- Affiliation: Social Democratic Party
- Status: Announced: 30 March 2026; Official nominee: 26 July 2026; Official launch: 16 August 2026; Lost election: 4 October 2026

The Ronaldo Caiado 2026 presidential campaign was officialized on 26 July 2026 in São Paulo. His running mate is the founder and president of the Social Democratic Party, Gilberto Kassab. Caiado, who previously served as Governor of Goiás from 2019 to 2026, was chosen by the Social Democratic Party to run in the 2026 presidential election. This is the second time Ronaldo Caiado has run for president, the first being in 1989.

== Background ==
After having been the founder and leader of the Democratic Ruralist Union in the 1980s, he became a presidential candidate in the 1989 election as a member of the Social Democratic Party—a party that initially intended to be the continuation of the homonymous party founded in 1945. Caiado ultimately placed tenth in the election and supported Fernando Collor in the runoff. Subsequently, Caiado served as Federal Deputy for Goiás from 1991 to 1995 and again from 1999 to 2015, as Senator from 2015 to 2019, and as Governor of his home state from 2019 to 2026—an administration marked by the growth of agribusiness, his crackdown on organized crime, and his rapprochement with the Bolsonarism. In a 2026 poll, 84% of voters in Goiás approved of his administration, while 11% disapproved.

After Jair Bolsonaro was declared ineligible for public office in 2023 by the Superior Electoral Court, Ronaldo Caiado consolidated his position as one of the main right-wing names for the 2026 electoral race. In November 2024, Brazil Union even confirmed his pre-candidacy and the official launch took place on April 4, 2025, at an event in Salvador. However, he left the party due to a lack of support. In January 2026, he became a member of the Social Democratic Party, which chose him to be its candidate in a dispute with the Governor of Rio Grande do Sul, Eduardo Leite. Gilberto Kassab was confirmed as his running mate on July 1, 2026.

The convention that formalized his candidacy took place on July 26, 2026, at the headquarters of the Social Democratic Party in São Paulo.

== Political positions ==
In his speech on July 30, 2026, Caiado voiced support for amnesty for Jair Bolsonaro and for those implicated in the January 8 attacks in Brasília; underscored the need to combat organized crime and drug trafficking; argued that Brazil should assume a leading role in the exploration and processing of critical minerals; put forward educational and social reforms based on the Goiás model; advocated for political reform "to bring greater rationality to the political system"; and reaffirmed his commitment to private sector and the market economy as the engines of national development, singling out agribusiness as the most competitive segment of Brazil's economy.

In an interview with Metrópoles in July 2026, he defended a reform of the criteria for appointing ministers to the Supreme Federal Court, criticizing the appointment of personal allies to the Court, and stating that appointments do not always follow the criteria set forth in the Constitution.

== Endorsements ==
=== Brazilian Politicians ===
- Ratinho Júnior, Governor of Paraná
- Eduardo Leite, Governor of Rio Grande do Sul
- Mara Gabrilli, Senator for São Paulo
- Aldo Rebelo, former Municipal Secretary of International Affairs of São Paulo

=== Celebrities ===
- Silvia Abravanel, television presenter

== Candidates ==
The following politicians announced their candidacy. The political parties had up to 15 August 2026 to formally register their candidates.

Social Democratic Party ticket
Ronaldo Caiado	Gilberto Kassab
for President	for Vice President
Governor of Goiás (2019–2026)	Minister of Science and Technology (2016–2019)
