= ADI 6200 =

Asbestos extraction case in the Supreme Court of Brazil

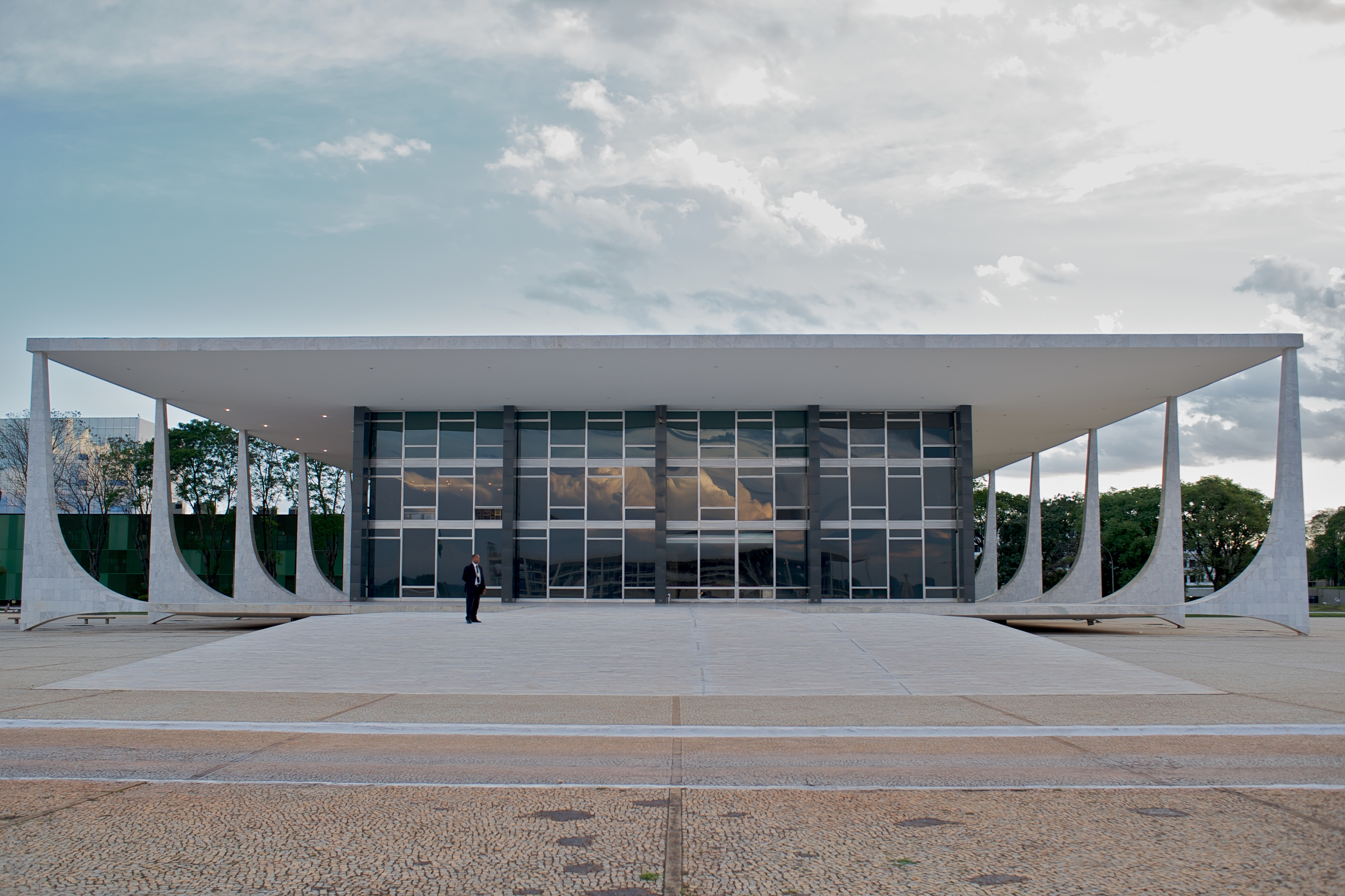
- Court: Supreme Federal Court
- Full case name: Ação Direta de Inconstitucionalidade 6200 (Associação Nacional dos Procuradores do Trabalho (ANPT) v. Governor of the state of Goiás)
- Started: 22 July 2019
- Decided: 18 September 2026; 45 days ago

Court membership
- Judges sitting: Alexandre de Moraes; Edson Fachin; Luiz Fux; Cármen Lúcia; Nunes Marques; Gilmar Mendes; André Mendonça; Rosa Weber; Cristiano Zanin

Case opinions
- Decision by: de Moraes
- Concurrence: Fux, Lúcia, Marques, Mendes, Mendonça, Zanin
- Concur/dissent: Fachin, Weber

Keywords
- Asbestos

ADI 6200 (Note: The full case name is Ação Direta de Inconstitucionalidade 6200, which translates to Direct Action of Unconstituionality 6200) was a case of the Supreme Court of Brazil concerning the constitutionality of a 2019 Goiás state law that allowed for the extraction of asbestos in the state. The legislation went against a 2017 Supreme Court decision, which had ruled no asbestos extraction was constitutional due to its adverse health effects on the workers. A little over 7 years after the case was brought to the Court, in September 2026 it decided unanimously on the unconstitutionality of the state law, noting that there are no safe levels of exposure to asbestos.

== Background ==
=== Prior state of asbestos legislation ===
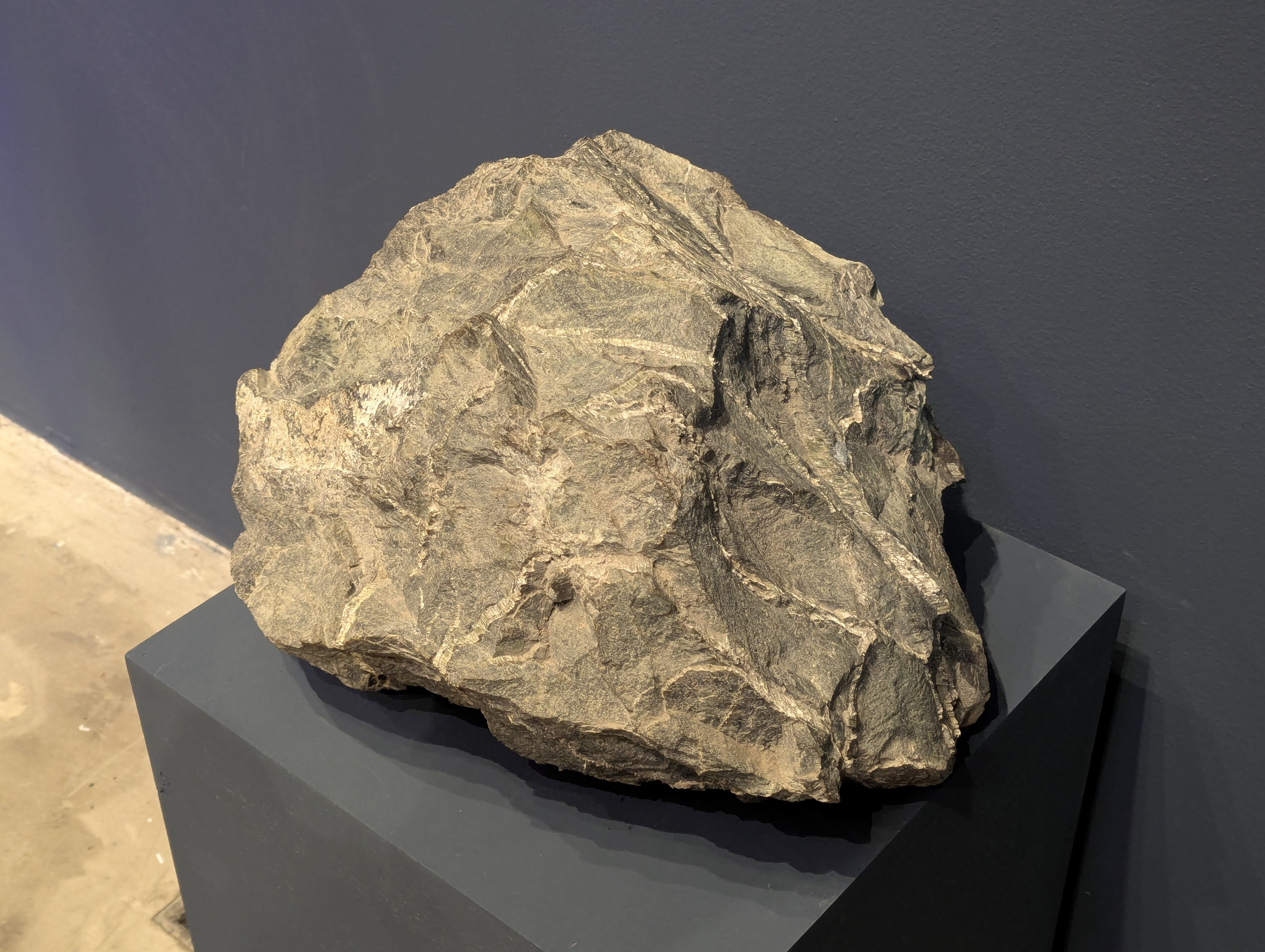
Unprocessed chrysotile sample from the Earth Sciences Museum on display in Rio de Janeiro, Brazil

On 1 June 1995, then-Brazilian president Fernando Henrique Cardoso promulgated Law 9,055, prohibiting the extraction, production, industrialization and commercialization of five of the six recognized types of asbestos: actinolite, amosite (brown asbestos), anthophyllite, crocidolite (blue asbestos) and tremolite. Notably, it did not prohibit chrysotile (white asbestos), but instead allowed its extraction, industrialization and sale within given safety parameters.

Throughout the years, multiple states passed legislation prohibiting the remaining type of asbestos within their borders. For example, that was the case of Pernambuco with State Law 12,589 of 2004, of Rio de Janeiro with State Law 3,579 of 2001, of Rio Grande do Sul with State Law 11,643 of 2001, and of São Paulo with State Law 12,684 of 2007. However, since the 1995 federal law explicitly permitted use of the material, the debate of whether state law could directly contradict federal law on this matter was brought to the courts.

In one such case, for instance, the National Industry Workers' Confederation (Confederação Nacional dos Trabalhadores da Indústria; CNTI) argued to the Supreme Court that the state legislation was unconstitutional, because the Constitution states the Federal Government is solely responsible for determining and inspecting working conditions.

In 2017, while ruling on these cases, the Supreme Court determined that the state laws were constitutional, and instead that the exception carved out for white asbestos in the 1995 law itself was unconstitutional. Minister and case rapporteur Rosa Weber argued that the federal law had established minimum safety parameters, and it was not contradictory for states to legislate over it by being even more cautious.

Following the decision, CNTI appealed to the Supreme Court, requesting a review of the outcome. It argued the court shouldn't have ruled on the unconstitutionality of a separate piece of legislation, when its case was about a state law; thus, had it not submitted a case to the court in the first place, asbestos would have remained legal in multiple states. In February 2023, this appeal was denied by the court.

=== Goiás visit and legislation ===
The sole operational asbestos mine in the country – and in the Americas as a whole – is located in the state of Goiás, in the mining town of Minaçu, which was built in 1965 around the recently discovered Cana Brava mine. Consequently, a non-insignificant portion of jobs in Minaçu – reportedly about 22% between 2007 and 2011 – are attributable to asbestos mining, a fact that is often used as an argument for keeping the mine open. (Note: Though, more recently, rare-earth mineral deposits were discovered in the mines, which have been seen as an off-ramp to transition away from asbestos.) Another argument is the financial one, seeing as around 70% of the Goiás' state tax revenue (Imposto sobre Circulação de Mercadorias e Serviços; ICMS) comes from its mining operations, a large share of which is of asbestos.

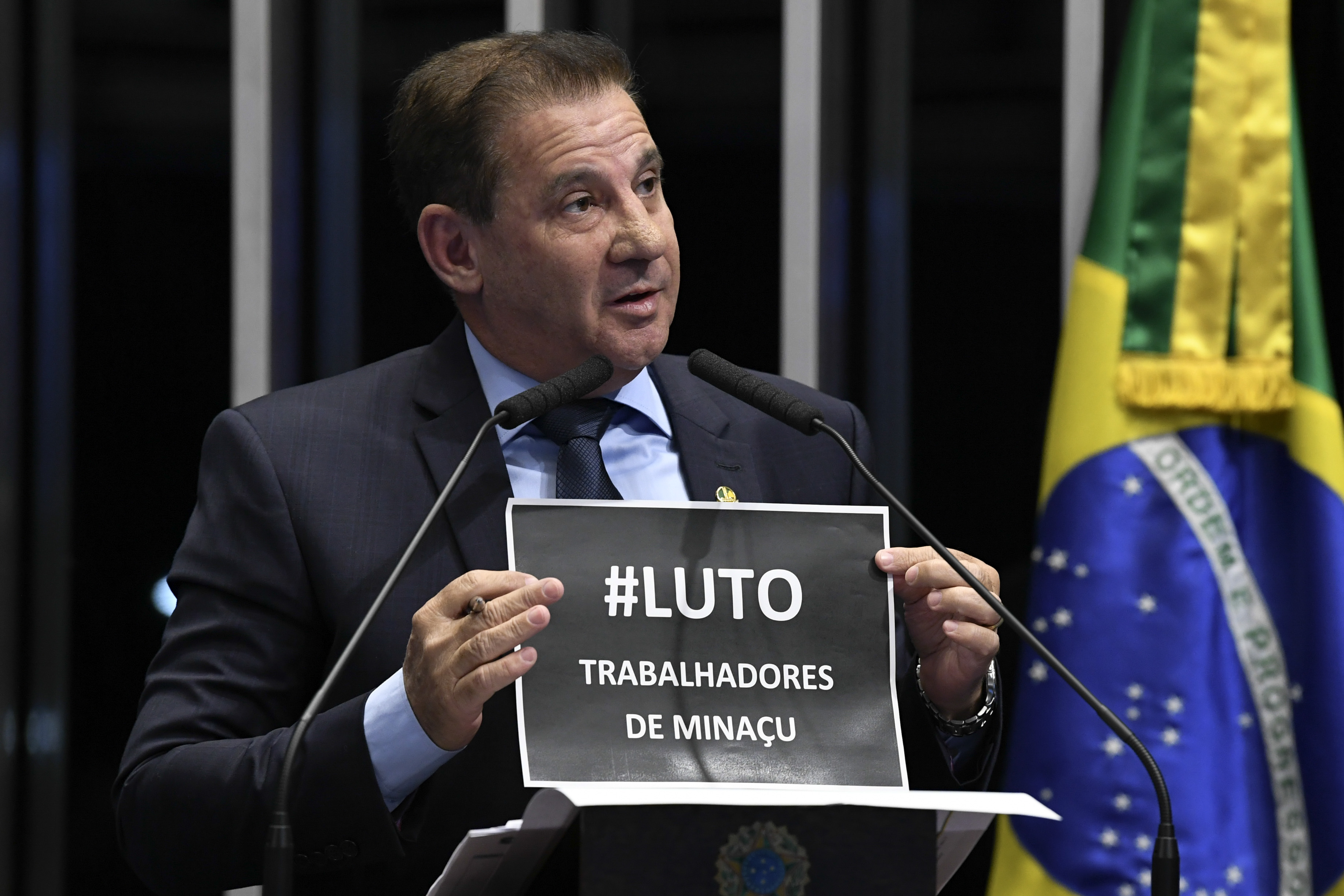
Senator Vanderlan Cardoso, after the Minaçu visit, speaks to the Senate in defense of reopening the asbestos mine, with a sign saying "#Mourning Workers of Minaçu" (for losing their jobs): "No one from the Supreme Court went to Minaçu to see [...] if it was the kind of asbestos that, according to the WHO, caused cancer. They didn't even go there."

In April 2019, then-Federal Senate president Davi Alcolumbre and six other senators travelled to Minaçu, alongside Goiás state governor Ronaldo Caiado, in a campaign to defend the legalization of asbestos mining operations.

Os trabalhos científicos estão aí mostrando que não existe nenhum problema de– que causa câncer, como foi justificado para [o fechamento da mina]. Então, nós temos a convicção que o Supremo Tribunal Federal vai rever a sua posição, e vai entender que essa mina é fundamental para a população de Minaçu, para Goiás e para o Brasil.
The scientific literature is out there showing there's no problem of– that causes cancer, as has been the justification for [the mine's] closure. So, we are convinced the Surpeme Court will revisit its position, and understand that this mine is fundamental for the population fo Minaçu, for Goiás and for Brazil.

— Senator Chico Rodrigues, in interview to TV Senado.

A few months later, in July 2019, governor Caiado promulgated State Law 20,514, which again authorized extraction and processing of white asbestos in the state, with the caveat that the totality of the extracted mineral must be exported outside the country. A reported lack of oversight has permitted the transport of the material through states with legislation prohibiting it, such as São Paulo.

=== Supreme Court case ===
Closely following the promulgation of the Goiás law, the National Association of Work Prosecutors (Associação Nacional dos Procuradores do Trabalho; ANPT) submitted case ADI 6200 in the Supreme Court, arguing the legislation is unconstitutional and goes against the previous decisions of the court, calling it "an affront to the principle of the separation of powers".

== Votes ==
As rapporteur, minister Alexandre de Moraes published a 25-page decision arguing that the Goiás law was unconstitutional. In his decision, the minister mentioned a vote by minister Rosa Weber in a previous asbestos case, which cited specific articles of the Constitution of Brazil that safeguard the fundamental right to health, the right to a risk-free working environment, and the preservation of a balanced natural environment; (Note: Articles 6th, 7th (XXII), 196 and 225 of the Constitution of Brazil.) de Moraes also directly quoted Directive 2009/148/EC of the European Parliament, which states: "current scientific knowledge is not such that a level [of asbestos exposure] can be established below which risks to health cease to exist". The minister further stated that the previous decisions of the court concerning asbestos were valid even, as the state government of Goiás' defense argued, in the case of extraction solely for export, as that still posed health and environmental risks.

In his decision, de Moraes initially allowed for one final year of mining operations after the court had reached a decision, dubbed a "modulation". After Goiás passed another state law, in August 2024, (Note: State law #22,932, of 15 August 2024.) setting a time limit of five years for asbestos extraction in the state (lasting until 2029), de Moraes amended his decision to extend the modulation period to two years.

The ministers Rosa Weber and Edson Fachin dissented in part, arguing the law was unconstitutional, but that no transition period should be given, meaning mining activities should cease immediately after the court reached a decision.

Voting was suspended following a request for review of the case by minister Nunes Marques, which postpones the trial for up to 90 work days. After it returned in October 2025, both Marques and minister Gilmar Mendes agreed on the unconstitutionality, but argued a longer transition period, of five years, should be given before mining is no longer allowed to continue.

Following Marques and Mendes' votes, minister André Mendonça too requested a review of the case. In late March 2026, the review deadline expired, and in early April the trial resumed, only for minister Luiz Fux to request yet another review, again suspending the trial.

In September 2026, the case returned in a virtual setting, and the Court unanimously agreed on the unconstitutionality of the Goiás state law. Further, no agreement on a "modulation" period was reached, so the decision was to take effect immediately.

== High Court decision ==
=== Judiciary representation ===
Supreme Court members	Ministers	Yes	No
Alexandre de Moraes	1	1	
Edson Fachin	1	1	
Luiz Fux	1	1	
Cármen Lúcia	1	1	
Nunes Marques	1	1	
Gilmar Mendes	1	1	
André Mendonça	1	1	
Dias Toffoli	1	—N/a	
Rosa Weber	1	1	
Cristiano Zanin	1	1	
Vacant seat	1	—N/a	
Total	11	9	0

Note: Minister Dias Toffoli recused himself from the case, and a replacement for former minister Luís Roberto Barroso hadn't been approved by the Senate before the case was decided on.

== See also ==
- Asbestos law
