= Heuler Cruvinel =

Brazilian politician (born 1978)

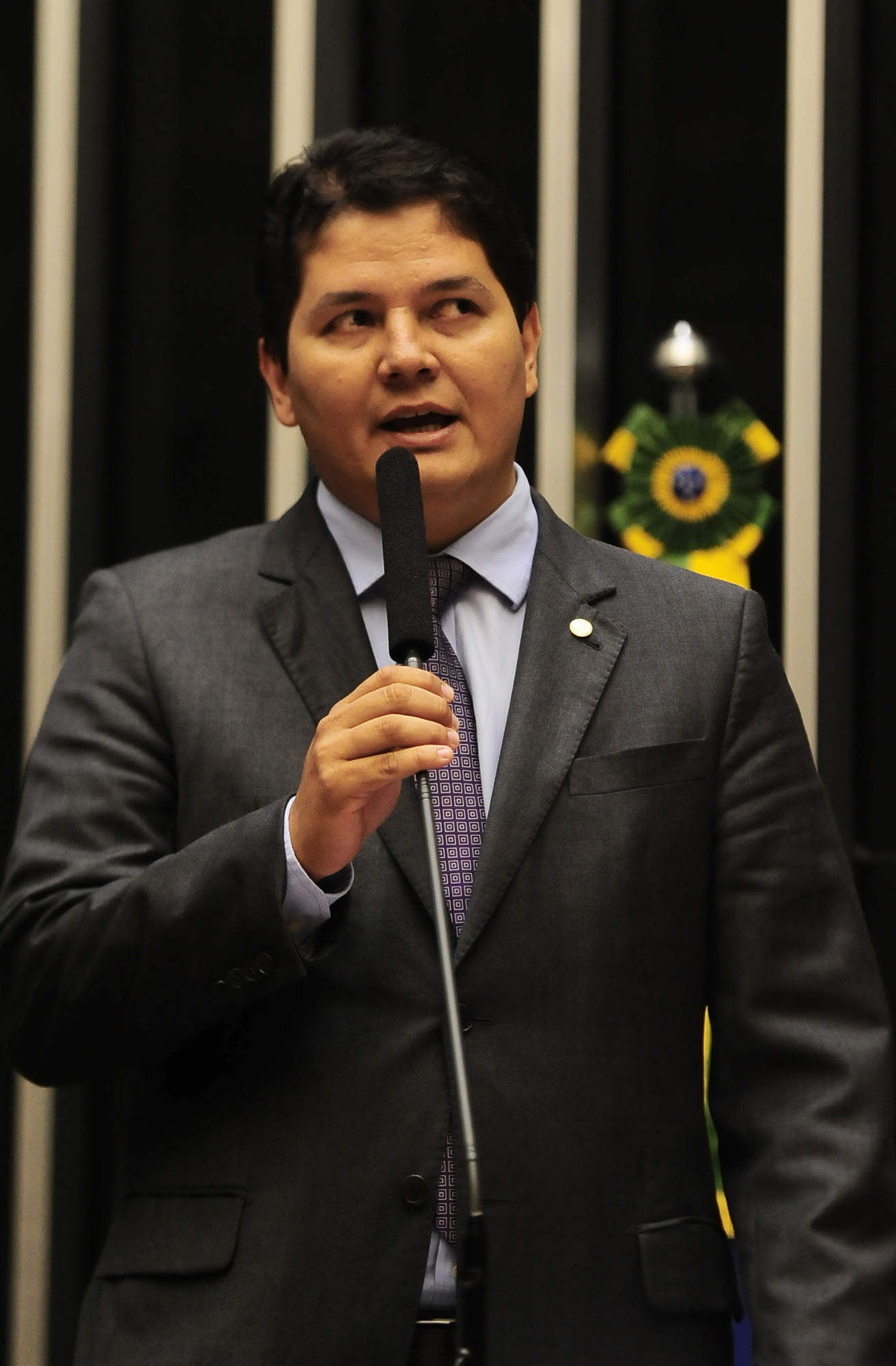
- Cruvinel in 2012

Member of the Chamber of Deputies
- In office 1 February 2011 – 31 January 2019
- Constituency: Goiás

Personal details
- Born: 6 February 1978 (age 48)
- Party: Democratic Renewal Party (since 2023)

Heuler Abreu Cruvinel (born 6 February 1978) is a Brazilian politician. From 2011 to 2019, he was a member of the Chamber of Deputies. From 2009 to 2010, he served as secretary of government and housing of Rio Verde. In the 2018 and 2022 gubernatorial elections, he was a candidate for vice governor of Goiás.
