= Indonesia–Venezuela relations =

- Indonesia: Venezuela

Diplomatic mission
- Indonesian Embassy, Caracas: Venezuelan Embassy, Jakarta

Indonesia and Venezuela established diplomatic relations in 1959. Since then, both countries enjoy friendly ties. Both nations agreed to expand the trade and investment relations, especially in tourism, technology, chemicals and natural gas sectors. Indonesia has an embassy in Caracas, while Venezuela has an embassy in Jakarta. Indonesia and Venezuela are members of multilateral organizations such as the World Trade Organization (WTO), Non-Aligned Movement and Forum of East Asia-Latin America Cooperation.

== History ==
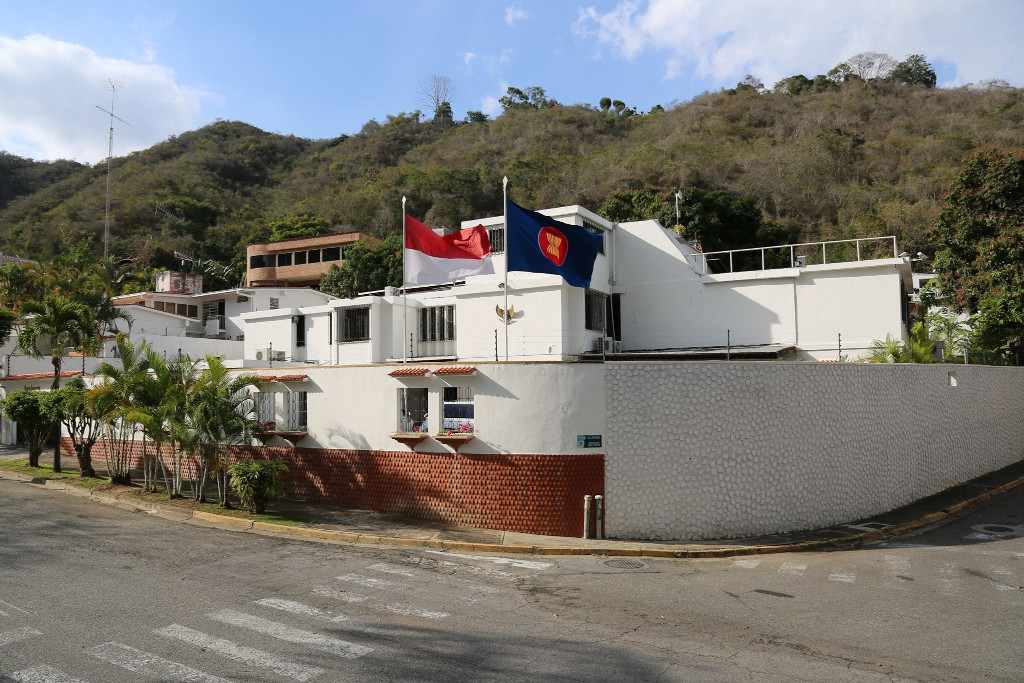
Embassy of Indonesia in Caracas

Nearly two decades after the establishment of diplomatic relations on October 10, 1959. Jakarta opened its embassy in Caracas in 1977. Venezuela reciprocated in 1981.

On August 12, 2000, Venezuelan president Hugo Chávez visited Jakarta and paid courtesy call to Indonesian president Abdurrahman Wahid. Subsequently, in the next month on 26–28 September 2000 Indonesian president Abdurrahman Wahid visited Caracas to attend the OPEC summit, and paid a courtesy call to Hugo Chávez. Venezuela has donated US$2 million for the relief effort promptly after the tsunami devastated Aceh in 2004. Venezuela also promoted education in Aceh by establishing Institute of Polytechnic of Venezuela-Indonesia in Aceh inaugurated in 2009.

== Trade and commerce ==
The bilateral trade between Indonesia and Venezuela saw a remarkable increase, tripled in five years between 2003 and 2008. In 2003 the trade stood at just US$24.93 million, rose to US$82.55 million in 2007, and US$92.27 million in 2008. In 2009 bilateral trade rose to US$96 million. From Indonesia, Venezuela imported textiles, cotton, natural rubber, fiber, wood products, electrical equipment, footwear and sports equipment, while exporting plastic, cyclic amides, silicon dioxide and aluminum alloys to Indonesia. The trade balance is in favor to Indonesia, with $79.19 million worth of Indonesian exports to Venezuela in 2009.

Based on the last available data from 2023, however, the bilateral trade was greatly decreased compared from 15 years before. Indonesia trade exports to Venezuela around US$27.7 million worth commodities, while Venezuela trade exports to Indonesia around US$20.4 million worth commodities. Indonesia mainly exports soaps, small cars and auto parts, and industrial fiber materials to Venezuela, while Venezuela mainly exports dried legumes, cocoa beans, and raw aluminum to Indonesia. Great distances between the countries, and also prolonged political crises and economical instabilities in Venezuela, as well President Maduro mismanagements, contributing the factors in de-flourishment of trade between Indonesia and Venezuela.

== Oil and gas exploration and mining ==
Pertamina, through one of its subsidiaries, PT Pertamina Internasional Eksplorasi dan Produksi (PIEP) is major shareholder of Maurel and Prom (M&P), holding around 71.09% of M&P shares. M&P manages Urdaneta Oeste oil and gas field located at Lake Maracaibo, with 40% stake of ownership, thus making that Venezuelan production plant as one of Pertamina important oil and gas mining sites. While the operation of the production plant unaffected by 2026 United States strikes in Venezuela, Pertamina and PIEP closely monitored the political and security development to ensure production continuation and safety of all workers working there, including Indonesian oil and gas engineers empolyed at the plant.

== See also ==
- Foreign relations of Indonesia
- Foreign relations of Venezuela
