= Lincoln Tejota =

Brazilian politician (born 1984)

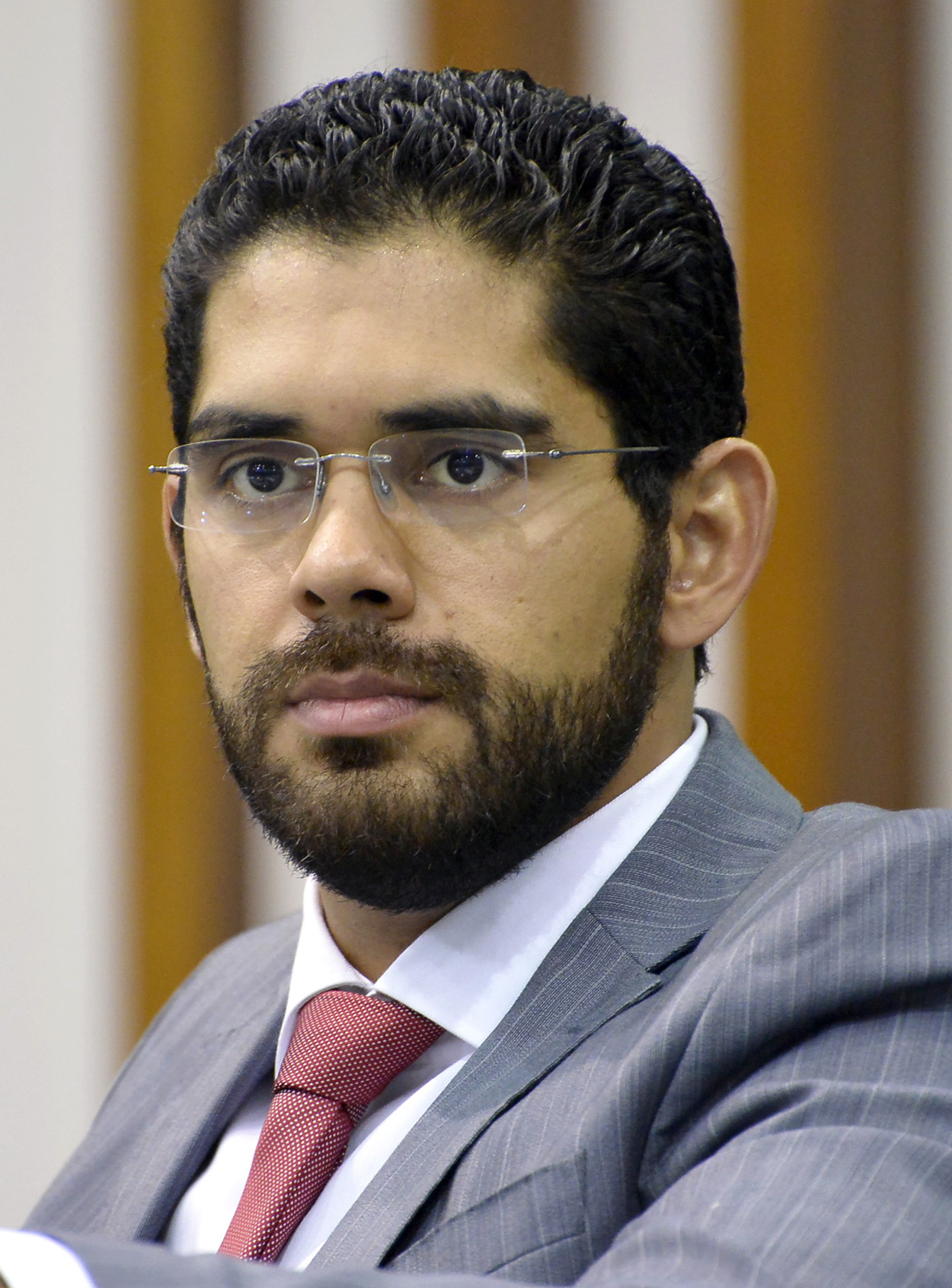
- Tejota in 2015

Vice Governor of Goiás
- In office 1 January 2019 – 31 December 2022
- Governor: Ronaldo Caiado
- Preceded by: José Eliton
- Succeeded by: Daniel Vilela

Personal details
- Born: 4 March 1984 (age 42)
- Party: Brazil Union (since 2022)

Lincoln Graziani Pereira da Rocha Tejota (born 4 March 1984) is a Brazilian politician. He has been a member of the Legislative Assembly of Goiás since 2023, having previously served from 2011 to 2019. From 2019 to 2022, he served as vice governor of Goiás.
