= Embassy of Indonesia, Caracas =

Embassy of the Republic of Indonesia in Caracas Kedutaan Besar Republik Indonesia di Caracas Embajada de la República de Indonesia en Caracas

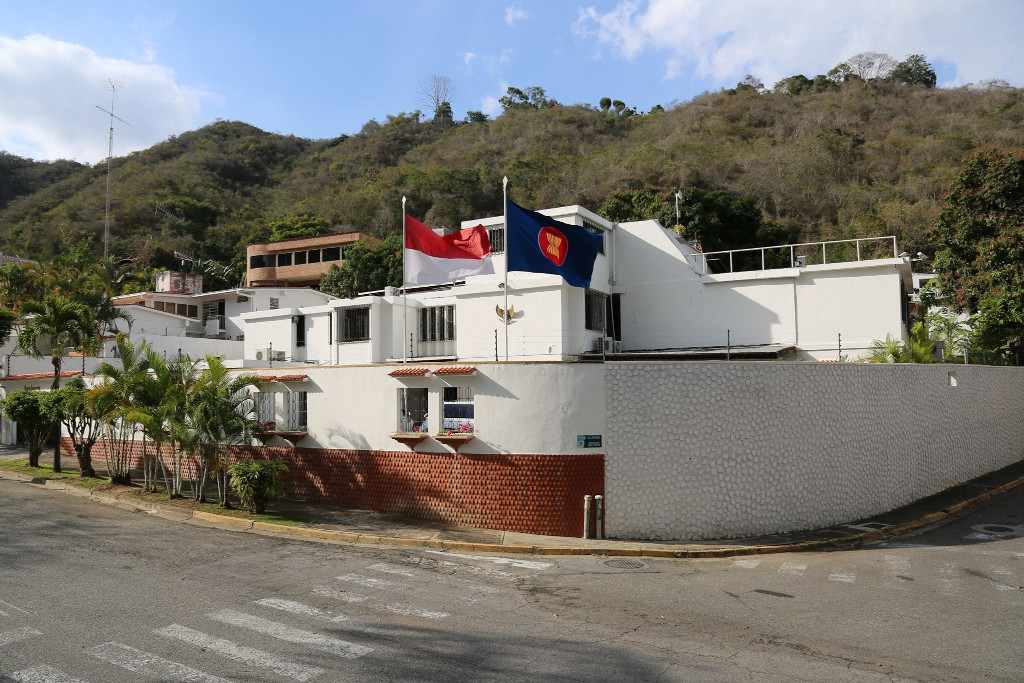
- Location: Caracas, Venezuela
- Address: Avenida El Paseo; Prados Del Este; Caracas 1080, Venezuela
- Coordinates: 10.453402°N 66.888295°W
- Ambassador: Imam Edy Mulyono
- Jurisdiction: Venezuela; Dominica; Grenada; Saint Lucia; Saint Vincent and the Grenadines; Trinidad and Tobago
- Website: kemlu.go.id/caracas/en/

The Embassy of the Republic of Indonesia in Caracas (Indonesian: Kedutaan Besar Republik Indonesia di Caracas; Spanish: Embajada de la República de Indonesia en Caracas) is the diplomatic mission of the Republic of Indonesia to the Bolivarian Republic of Venezuela. The embassy is concurrently accredited to five other surrounding countries:

- Dominica
- Grenada
- Saint Lucia
- Saint Vincent and the Grenadines
- Trinidad and Tobago

Diplomatic relations between Indonesia and Venezuela were established on 10 October 1959. In 1977, the Indonesian government opened the embassy in Caracas with Ferdy Salim as the first Indonesian ambassador to Venezuela. The current ambassador, Mochammad Luthfie Witto'eng, was appointed by President Joko Widodo on 25 February 2016.

== See also ==
- Indonesia–Venezuela relations
- List of diplomatic missions of Indonesia
- List of diplomatic missions in Venezuela
