= 2026 Social Democratic Party presidential selection =

Brazilian political primary

2026 PSD presidential selection
- 30 March 2026
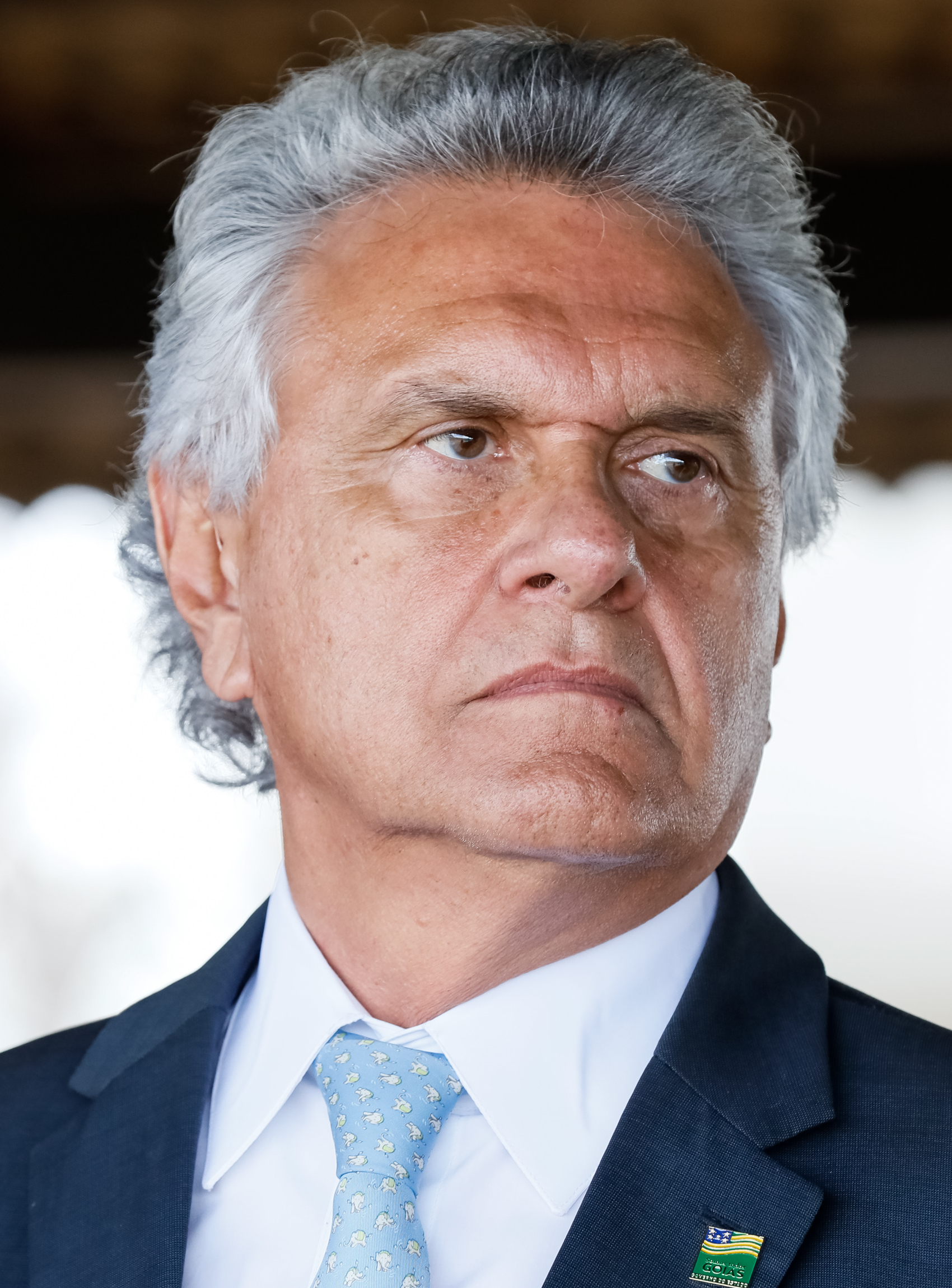

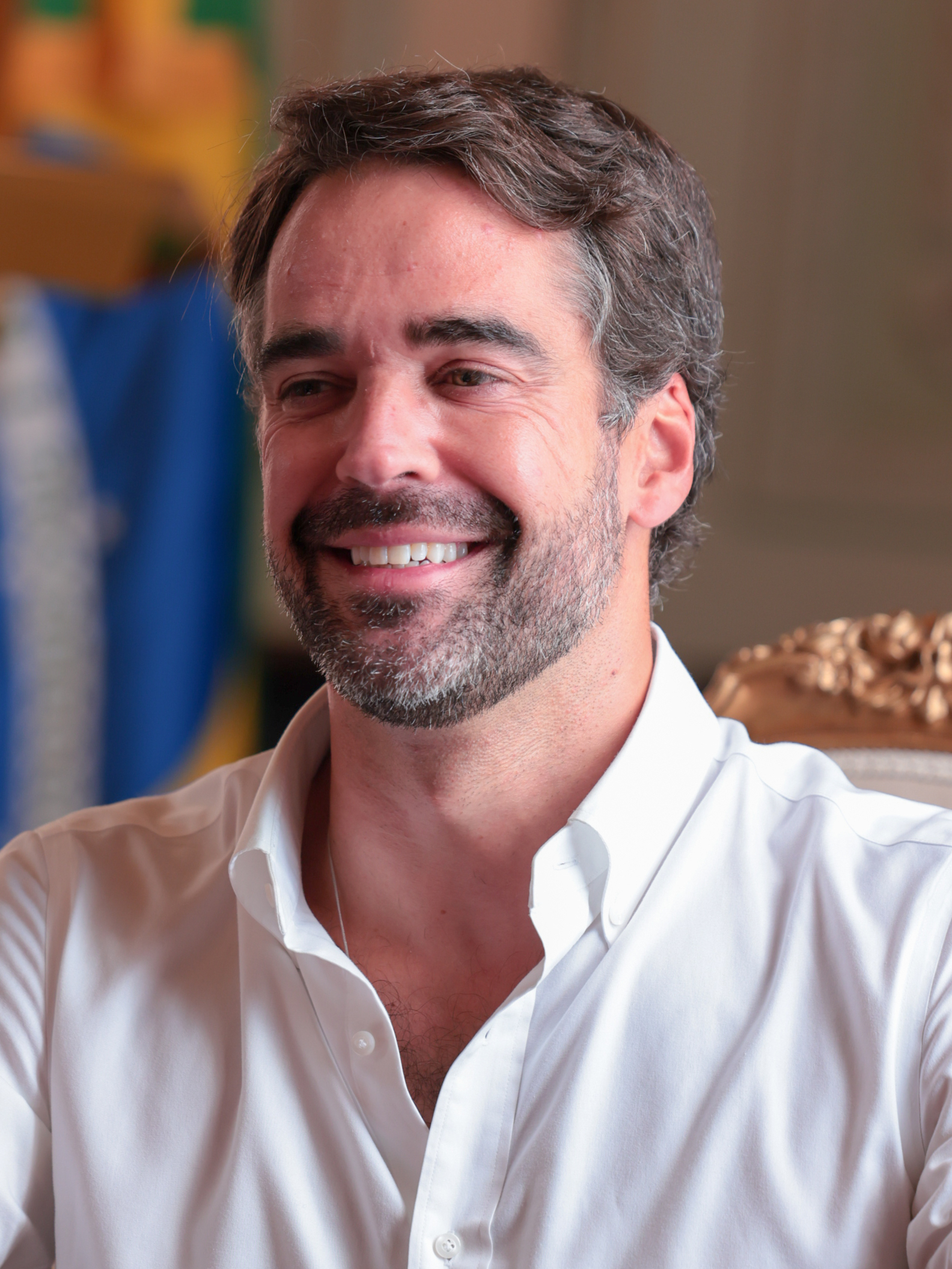

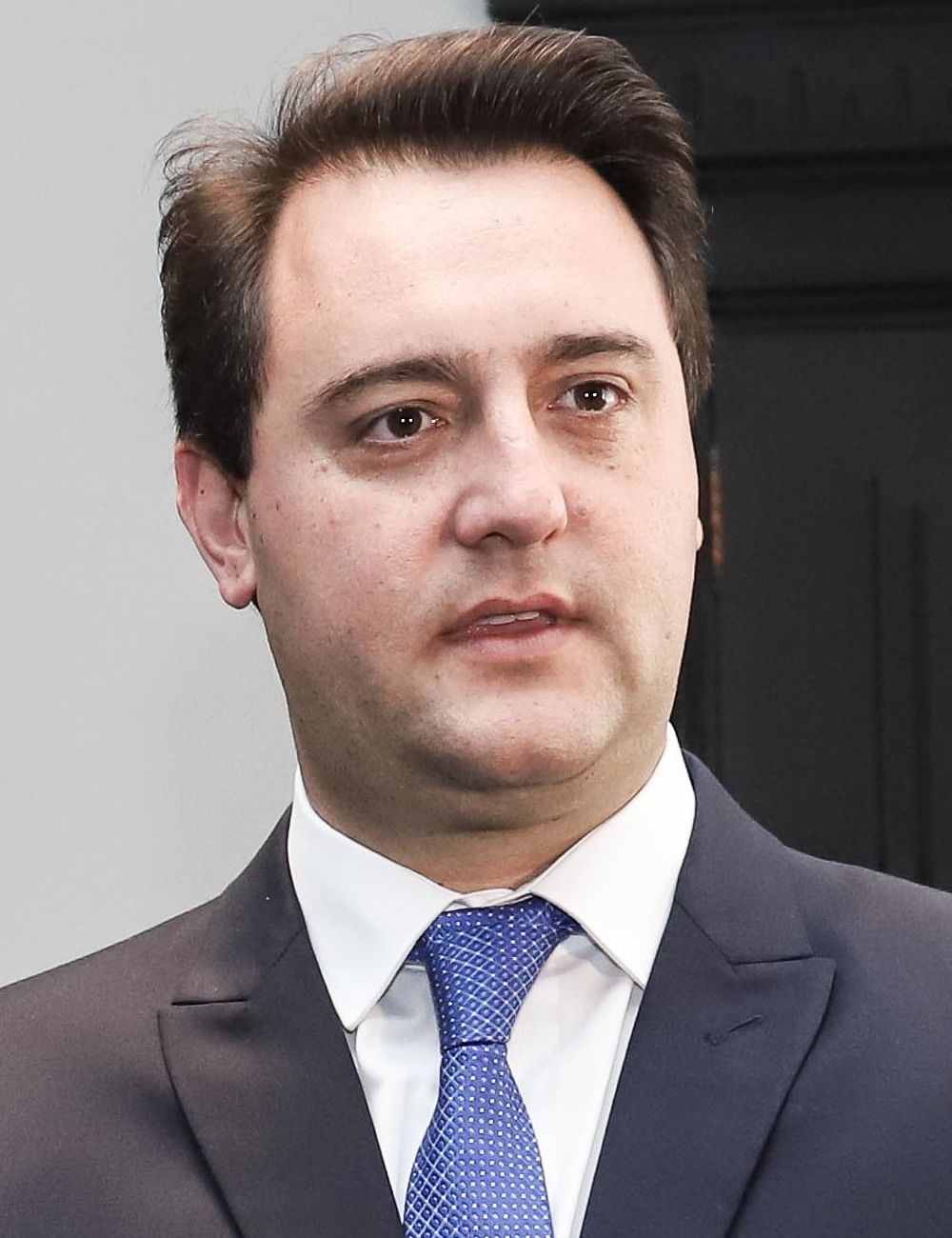
Candidate	Ronaldo Caiado; Nominee	Eduardo Leite; Lost nomination	Ratinho Júnior; Withdrew
Home state	Goiás	Rio Grande do Sul	Paraná
PSD nominee
Ronaldo Caiado

The Social Democratic Party (PSD)’s process for choosing its candidate for the 2026 Brazilian presidential election was conducted through internal party discussions led by its national president, Gilberto Kassab, and a small group of close advisors that included Andrea Matarazzo, Jorge Bornhausen, and Guilherme Afif Domingos, rather than through formal primaries or a party convention.

== Background ==
At first, Kassab signaled support for a potential presidential bid by São Paulo governor Tarcísio de Freitas (Republicans), which was understood to depend on the backing of former president Jair Bolsonaro. Throughout late 2025, Kassab reiterated this position while indicating that the PSD would maintain an alternative plan should such a candidacy not materialize. After Bolsonaro instead endorsed his son, Senator Flávio Bolsonaro, as his candidate for president, Tarcísio moved toward seeking re-election in São Paulo. In response, Kassab increasingly turned to the prospect of launching a presidential candidacy from within the PSD itself.

Initially, Paraná governor Ratinho Júnior was widely seen as the favorite within the party, and the announcement of his candidacy was expected to take place in late March, shortly before the deadline for officeholders wishing to run for president to step down from executive office. However, on 23 March, Ratinho withdrew from contention and decided to remain governor until the end of his term and work to elect a successor in the state, following Flávio Bolsonaro's endorsement of Senator Sergio Moro—who was leading in the polls—for the Paraná governorship. His withdrawal reshaped the PSD's internal dispute and left Ronaldo Caiado and Eduardo Leite as the two remaining main contenders.

After Ratinho's withdrawal, Caiado and Leite intensified their efforts both inside the party and in the broader political arena in search of support. Leite sought to present himself as a centrist alternative to Brazil's political polarization, criticizing both President Luiz Inácio Lula da Silva and Bolsonaro, and publicly opposing amnesty for those convicted over the attempted coup. Caiado, by contrast, projected a more explicitly right-wing profile, adopting a hardline stance on public security and the fight against organized crime, positioning himself closer to conservative voters dissatisfied with both the government and the traditional center.

On 30 March 2026, after the party's internal deliberations and consultations, the PSD chose Caiado as its presidential nominee. The decision reflected support from most of the party's national leadership and was influenced by internal polling and candidate profile assessments, with Caiado seen as more likely to capture a portion of the electorate aligned with Flávio Bolsonaro. In his first speech after being confirmed as the party's candidate, Caiado stated that, if elected president, his first act would be to sign a “broad, general and unrestricted” amnesty for all those involved in the attempted coup, including former president Jair Bolsonaro and the participants in the 8 January attacks.

Following the selection, Eduardo Leite did not endorse Caiado and said he was “disenchanted” with the party's decision, arguing that it would maintain Brazil's “polarized radicalization.” Shortly thereafter, the PSDB–Cidadania federation formally invited Leite to join one of its parties and run in the election on a centrist platform. On 1 April, Leite ruled out leaving the PSD and stated that he would not seek any office in the October elections, remaining as governor until the end of his term.
