= Lúcia Vânia Abrão Costa =

Brazilian politician

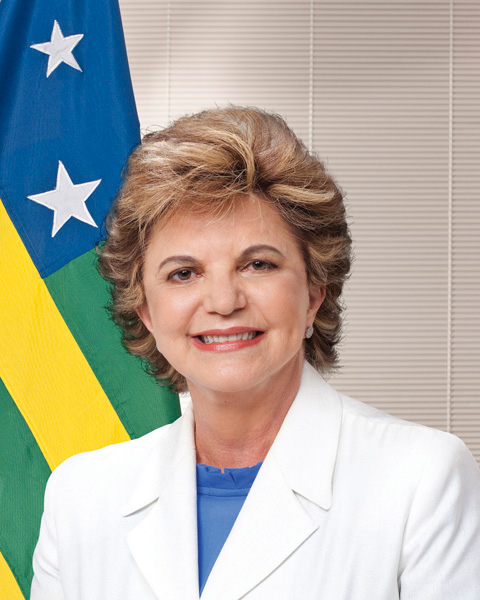

Senator from Goiás
- Incumbent
- Assumed office February 1, 2003

Deputy from Goiás
- In office February 1, 1999 – January 31, 2003

Secretary of State
- In office 1995–1998

Deputy from Goiás
- In office February 1, 1987 – January 31, 1995

Personal details
- Born: October 15, 1944 (age 81) Cumari, Goiás
- Party: Brazilian Socialist Party
- Profession: Journalist

Lúcia Vânia Abrão Costa (born October 15, 1944) is a Brazilian politician. She has represented Goiás in the Federal Senate since 2003. Previously she was a Deputy from Goiás from 1987 to 1995 and from 1999 to 2003. She is a member of the Brazilian Socialist Party.
