= Mochammad Luthfie Witto'eng =

Indonesian marines officer and diplomat

Ambassador of Indonesia to Venezuela, Dominica, Grenada, Saint Vincent and the Grenadines, and Trinidad and Tobago
- In office 25 February 2016 – 31 July 2020
- Preceded by: Prianti Gagarin Djatmiko Singgih
- Succeeded by: Imam Edy Mulyono

Personal details
- Education: Indonesian Naval Academy

Military service
- Allegiance: Indonesia
- Branch/service: Indonesian Navy
- Years of service: 1972 – 2005
- Rank: Major general
- Unit: Marine
- Commands: Military Strategic Intelligence Agency

Mochammad Luthfie Witto'eng is an Indonesian diplomat and former Marine Corps officer. From 25 February 2016 to 31 July 2020, he served as Indonesia's ambassador to Venezuela, with concurrent accreditation to Dominica, Grenada, Saint Vincent and the Grenadines, and Trinidad and Tobago. Earlier in his career, he served as assistant for intelligence to the Commander of the Indonesian National Armed Forces and chief of the military intelligence agency.

== Career ==
Witto'eng graduated from the Indonesian Naval Academy as a second lieutenant of the Marine Corps in 1972. During his military studies in the academy, Witto'eng became the commander of the cadet corps. Witto'eng had prior diplomatic experience as assistant military attaché at Indonesian embassy in Moscow and military attaché in The Hague. After serving as the director for military and defence at the military strategic intelligence agency, Witto'eng became the assistant for intelligence to the armed forces general chief of staff from 1 August 2002 to 24 June 2003. He then served as the chief of the military strategic intelligence agency from 24 June 2003 to 20 October 2005.

During the 2014 Indonesian presidential election, Witto'eng was part of Joko Widodo's presidential campaign team. On 25 February 2016, Witto'eng was installed as ambassador to Venezuela, with concurrent accreditation to Dominica, Grenada, Saint Vincent and the Grenadines, and Trinidad and Tobago. He presented his credentials to President of Venezuela Nicolas Maduro on 4 May 2016, to President of Dominica Charles Savarin on 20 June 2016, President of Trinidad and Tobago Anthony Carmona on 25 May 2017, and to Governor-General of Saint Lucia Neville Cenac on 19 February 2018. His replacement was installed on 14 September 2020. Witto'eng joined the Anies Baswedan campaign team during the 2024 Indonesian presidential election.
