= Government of Goiás =

Daniel Vilela
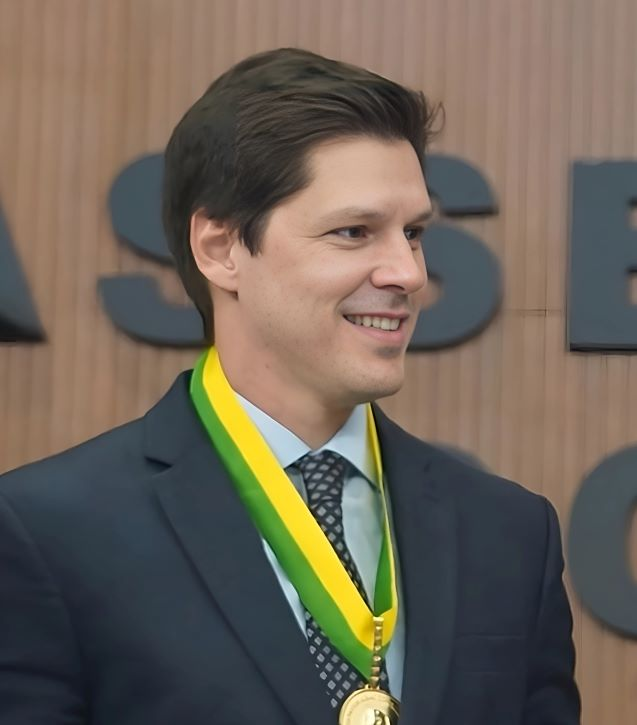

Governor of Goiás
- Incumbent
- Assumed office March 31st, 2026

Personal details
- Born: October 23, 1983 (age 42)

Coat of arms of Goiás

The Government of Goiás, a state in Brazil, includes an executive, the State Governor, a Legislative Assembly and a judiciary. The State Governor is directly elected for 1-2 four year terms. The main governmental headquarters is called the Palácio das Esmeraldas. The judiciary includes the Court of Justice and other courts.

== Executive ==
As of May 2026, the Governor is Daniel Vilela, and the Vice-Governor position is not currently held due to Daniel Vilela being appointed from Vice Governor to Governor.

== Legislative ==
The legislature is located in the state capital, and meets at Alfredo Nasser Palace. It includes 41 elected deputies, who server four year terms. The president of the assembly is Bruno Peixoto.

== Judiciary ==
The highest court in Goiás is the Court of Justice of the State of Goiás. It has a president, Leandro Crispim, and a vice president, Amaral Wilson de Oliveira.
