= Wilder Morais =

Brazilian politician

- Official portrait

Senator for Goiás
- Incumbent
- Assumed office February 1, 2023
- In office July 12, 2012 – February 1, 2019

Personal details
- Born: June 29, 1968 (age 58) Taquaral de Goiás, Goiás
- Party: PL (2022–present)
- Other political affiliations: DEM (2009–15; 2018–19); PP (2012–18); PROS (2019–20); PSC (2020–22)
- Education: Pontifical Catholic University of Goiás (BE)
- Profession: Engineer

Wilder Pedro de Morais (born June 29, 1968) is a Brazilian politician. He has represented Goiás in the Federal Senate since 2012.
