= José Eliton =

Brazilian politician (born 1972)

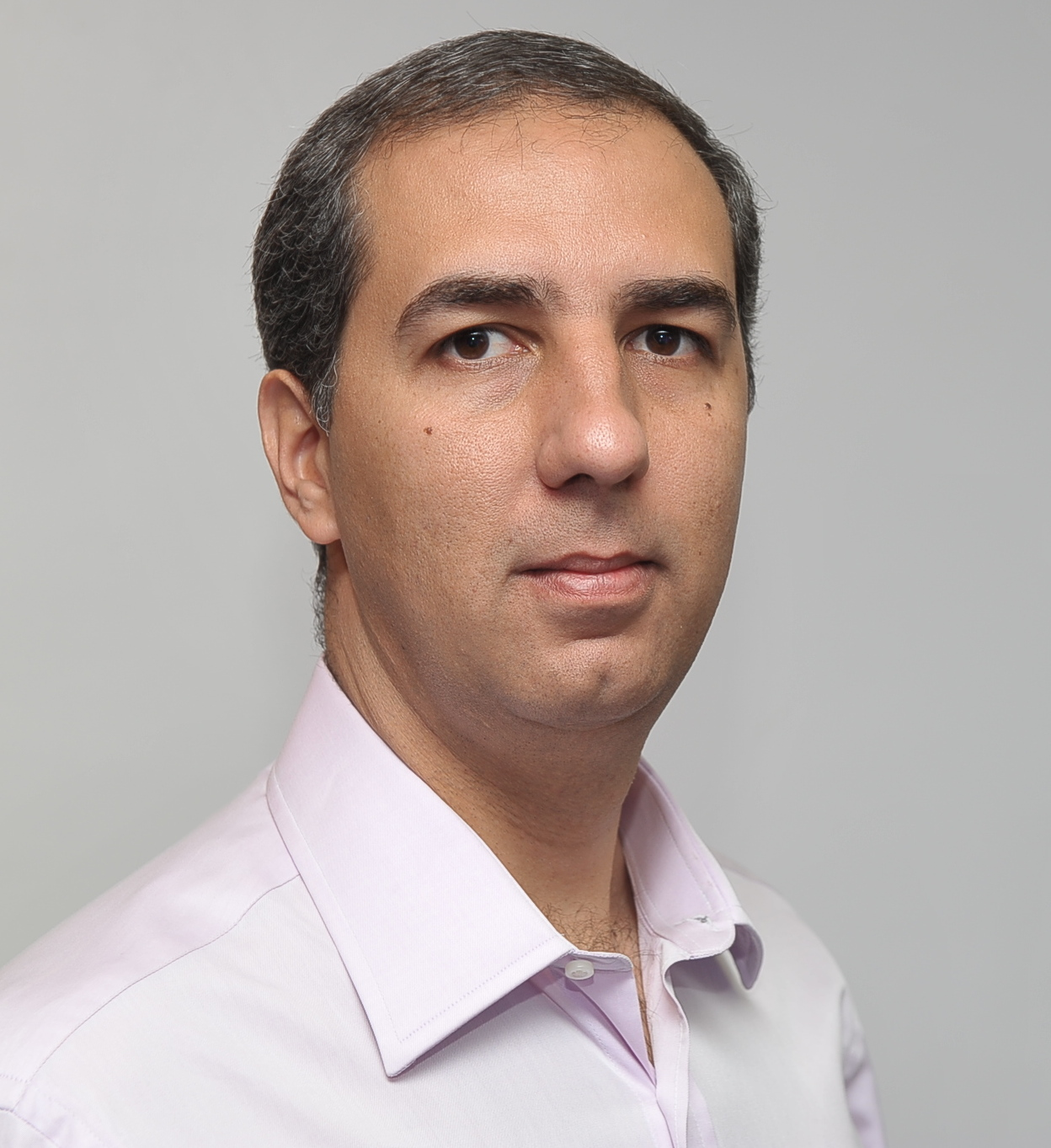
- Eliton in 2010

Governor of Goiás
- In office 7 April 2018 – 31 December 2018
- Preceded by: Marconi Perillo
- Succeeded by: Ronaldo Caiado

Personal details
- Born: 27 August 1972 (age 53)
- Party: Independent (since 2023)

José Eliton de Figuerêdo Júnior (born 27 August 1972) is a Brazilian politician. In 2018, he served as governor of Goiás. From 2011 to 2018, he served as vice governor of Goiás.
