= Daniel Vilela =

Brazilian politician (born 1983)

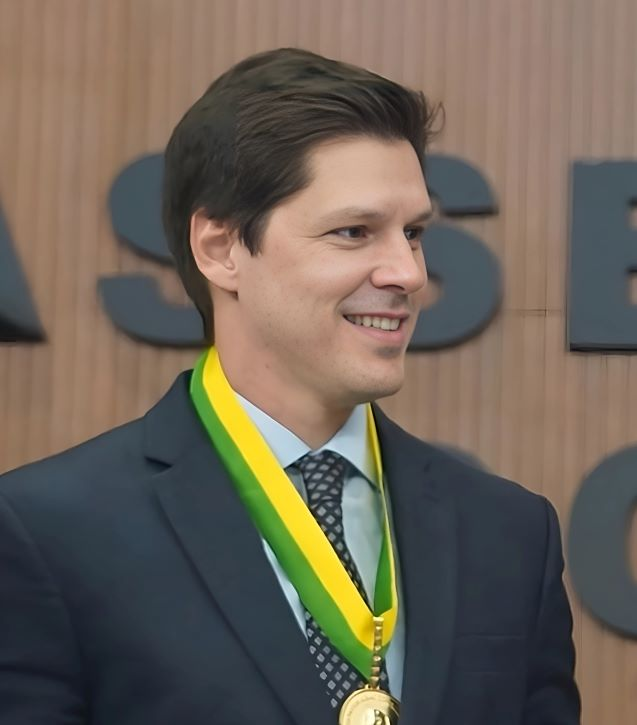
- Vilela in 2024

Governor of Goiás
- Incumbent
- Assumed office 31 March 2026
- Vice Governor: None
- Preceded by: Ronaldo Caiado

Vice Governor of Goiás
- In office 1 January 2023 – 31 March 2026
- Governor: Ronaldo Caiado
- Preceded by: Lincoln Tejota

Member of the Chamber of Deputies
- In office 1 February 2015 – 31 January 2019
- Constituency: Goiás

Personal details
- Born: 23 October 1983 (age 42)
- Party: Brazilian Democratic Movement (since 2007)
- Parent: Maguito Vilela (father)

Daniel Elias Carvalho Vilela (born 23 October 1983) is a Brazilian politician who has served as Governor of Goiás since 2026, having previously served as Vice Governor of Goiás from 2023 to 2026. From 2015 to 2019, he was a member of the Chamber of Deputies. From 2011 to 2014, he was a member of the Legislative Assembly of Goiás. He is the son of Maguito Vilela.
