= Ronaldo Caiado =

Brazilian politician (born 1949)

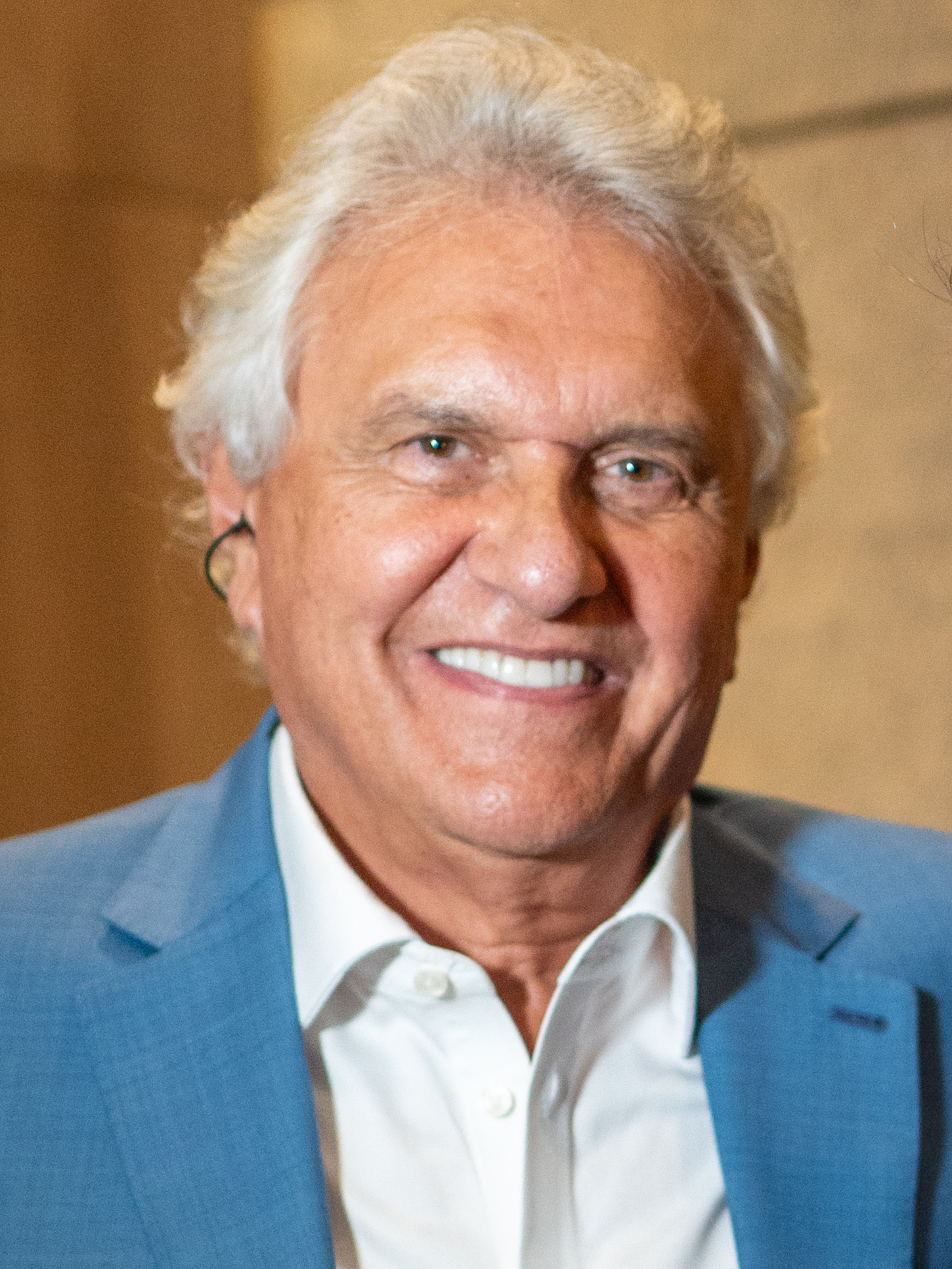
- Caiado in 2026

Governor of Goiás
- In office 1 January 2019 – 31 March 2026
- Vice Governor: Lincoln Tejota; Daniel Vilela
- Preceded by: José Eliton
- Succeeded by: Daniel Vilela

Senator for Goiás
- In office 1 February 2015 – 1 January 2019
- Preceded by: Cyro Miranda
- Succeeded by: Luiz Carlos do Carmo

Member of the Chamber of Deputies
- In office 1 February 1999 – 1 February 2015
- Constituency: Goiás
- In office 1 February 1991 – 1 February 1995
- Constituency: Goiás

Personal details
- Born: Ronaldo Ramos Caiado; 25 September 1949 (age 77) Anápolis, Goiás, Brazil
- Party: PSD (2026–present)
- Other political affiliations: PSD (1989–93); PFL (1993; 1994–2007); PPR (1993–1994); DEM (2007–2022); UNIÃO (2022–2026)
- Spouse: Gracinha Carvalho (m. 1990)
- Children: 2
- Education: School of Medicine and Surgery
- Profession: Physician

Ronaldo Ramos Caiado (born 25 September 1949) is a Brazilian politician who served as Governor of Goiás from 2019 to 2026, having previously represented the state as a Senator from 2015 to 2019. An orthopedic physician trained at the School of Medicine and Surgery of Rio de Janeiro, he comes from a family of landowners and politicians from Goiás. He is the grandson of Antonio Ramos Caiado, an oligarch who served as a member of the Chamber of Deputies from 1909 to 1921 and a senator from 1921 to 1930. Caiado served as chairman of the União Democrática Ruralista in the late eighties (1986–1989), an organization that aims to defend the interests of landowners. In 2026, he was selected as the Social Democratic Party’s candidate for President of Brazil.

== In politics ==
Caiado ran for president with the PSD, at 1989 Brazilian presidential election, obtaining 0.68% of the votes. He was elected federal deputy for Goiás in 1990. He ran for governor of Goiás in 1994, obtaining 3rd place with 23.18% of the votes.

Caiado was re-elected federal deputy successively in 1998, 2002, 2006 and 2010. In 2014 he was elected Senator and from February 1, 2015 to January 1, 2019 has been the DEM bench leader in the Senate.

In the October 2018 elections Ronaldo Caiado ran for governor in the state of Goiás, next to his vice-candidate Lincoln Tejota. Reaching 1.773.185 votes (59,73% of the valid votes), he was elected in the first round, beating Daniel Vilela, from the Brazilian Democratic Movement (MDB), with 479.180 votes (16,14% of the valid votes).

A right wing politician, his speeches often criticizes the PT government. In 2014 he was elected senator for the state of Goiás with 1,283,665 votes. He has also been described as both economically liberal and politically conservative.

== Controversies ==
=== Statements of Demostenes Torres ===
On 31 March 2015 the former senator from DEM, Demóstenes Torres, published an article in Goiás' newspaper Folha da Manhã, claiming that Ronaldo Caiado had expenses of the 2002 campaigns, 2006 and 2010 financed by Carlinhos Cachoeira scheme. Caiado denied the allegations, stating that Demostenes "has a typical behavior of a psychopath" and that the former senator was trying to get back at Caiado, as the latter had supported the impeachment process against Torres in 2012.

== Electoral history ==
| Election | Party | Office | Coalition | Running mate | First Round | | Result |
|---|---|---|---|---|---|---|---|
| Election | Party | Office | Coalition | Running mate | Votes | % | Result |
| 1989 Brazilian presidential election | PSD | President | Urban–Rural Union (PSD, PDN) | Camilo Calazans (PDN) | 488,893 | 0.72 | Lost |
| 1990 Goiás state election | PSD | Federal Deputy | Wake Up, Goiás Coalition | —N/a | 98,256 | 9.80 | Elected |
| 1994 Goiás state election | PFL | Governor | Let’s Change Goiás (PFL, PPR) | Nerivaldo Costa (PPR) | 364,767 | 23.18 | Lost |
| 1998 Goiás state election | PFL | Federal Deputy | Confidence in a New Era | —N/a | 100,446 | 5.41 | Elected |
| 2002 Goiás state election | PFL | Federal Deputy | New Times to Achieve More | —N/a | 114,728 | 4.40 | Elected |
| 2006 Goiás state election | PFL | Federal Deputy | —N/a | —N/a | 152,895 | 5.39 | Elected |
| 2010 Goiás state election | DEM | Federal Deputy | Goiás Wants More | —N/a | 167,591 | 5.81 | Elected |
| 2014 Goiás state election | DEM | Senator | Love for Goiás | —N/a | 1,283,665 | 47.57 | Elected |
| 2018 Goiás state election | DEM | Governor | Change Is Now (DEM, PRP, PROS, PMN, PMB, PSC, DC, PSL, PODE, PTC, PRTB, PDT) | Lincoln Tejota (PROS) | 1,773,185 | 59.73 | Elected |
| 2022 Goiás state election | União | Governor | Moving Forward (UNIÃO, MDB, PP, PSC, Solidariedade, PSD, Avante, PODE, PRTB, PDT, PROS) | Daniel Vilela (MDB) | 1,806,892 | 51.81 | Elected |

Political offices
| Preceded by José Eliton | Governor of Goiás; 2019–present | Incumbent |
